= River Irwell Railway Bridge =

Bridge in Manchester, England

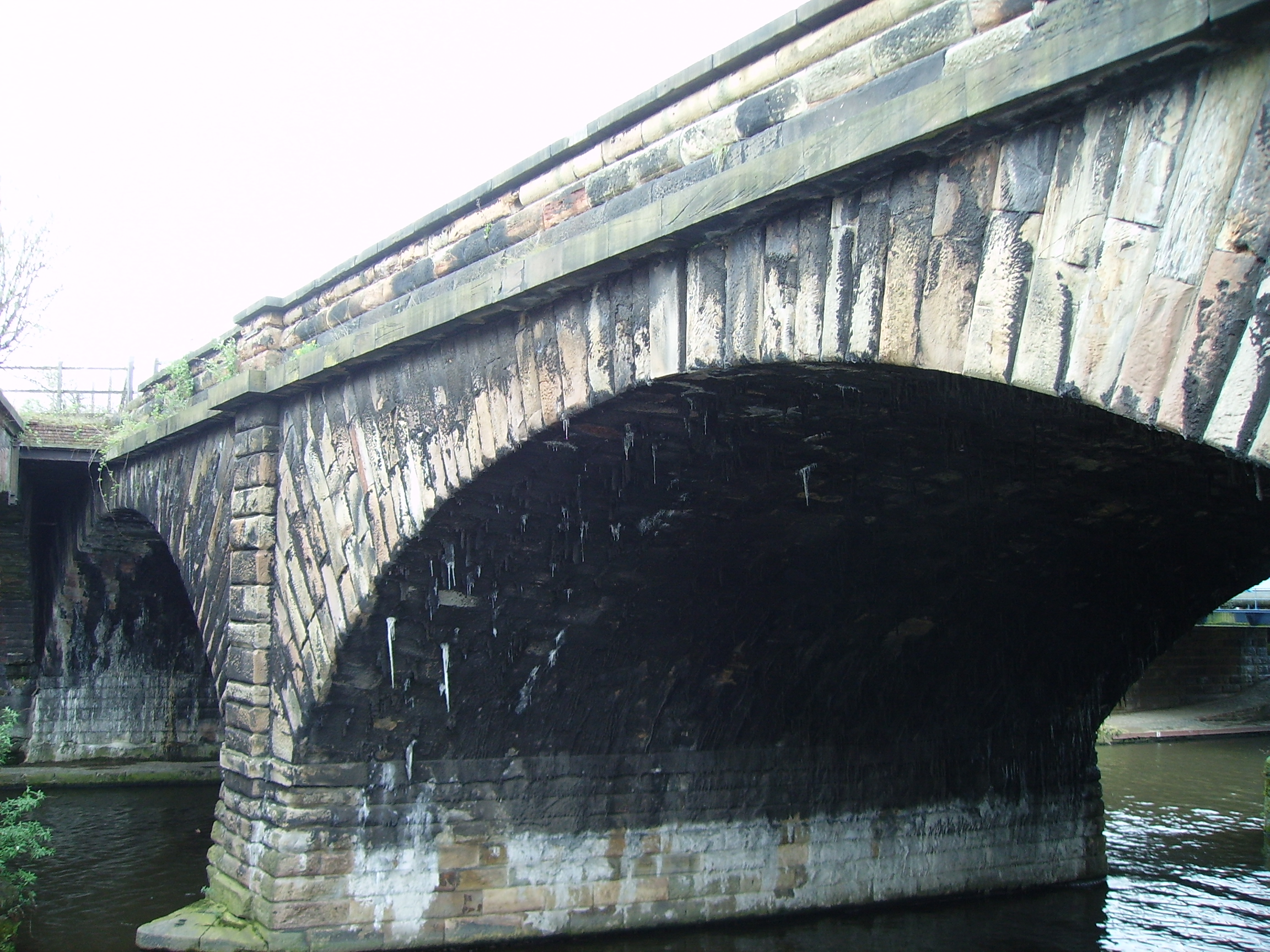
- Coordinates: 53.4779°N 2.2599°W
- Crosses: River Irwell
- Locale: Manchester, England

History
- Designer: George Stephenson
- Constructed by: George Stephenson
- Opened: 1 January 1830

Listed Building – Grade I
- Official name: Railway Bridge over River Irwell to Former Liverpool Road Station
- Designated: 19 June 1988
- Reference no.: 1270603

Location
- Interactive map of River Irwell Railway Bridge

The River Irwell Railway Bridge was built for the Liverpool & Manchester Railway (L&MR), the world's first passenger railway which used only steam locomotives and operated as a scheduled service, near Water Street in Manchester, England. The stone railway bridge, built in 1830 by George Stephenson, was part of Liverpool Road railway station. The bridge was designated a Grade I listed building on 19 June 1988.

The bridge was built by the L&MR on its line between Liverpool and Manchester. The bridge spanned the Irwell just before the terminus at Liverpool Road and was not part of the original plan. Construction was marred by an accident in April 1830 when eleven workers were drowned after an overcrowded boat sank after colliding with a cofferdam being used in the construction of the bridge's central pier. On 15 September 1830, the L&MR opened the line and the bridge.

In 2016, the bridge was restored as part of the programme to construct the Ordsall Chord, but the railway line severed the link between the bridge, which remains in use, and the former Liverpool Road Station.

== History ==
=== Construction ===
The River Irwell Bridge was built by the Liverpool & Manchester Railway who built the world's first intercity railway between Liverpool and Manchester. During 1829, parliament authorised a variation to the intended route of the railway which was planned to terminate in Salford. The route was extended into Manchester necessitating a bridge over the River Irwell to a station at the west end of Liverpool Road. The bridge was probably designed by George Stephenson, the L&MR's chief engineer but elements of its design may have originated from Jesse Hartley or Thomas Longridge Gooch.

The bridge is a masonry skew arch bridge, with two equal arches of 20.1 metres (66 ft) skew span, 19.7 metres (65 ft) square span, and 16.2 metres (53 ft) between the parapets. The bridge carries a twin standard gauge track layout and a 5.5-metre (18 ft) wide roadway. The decision to include a road is alleged to have been made in the face of opposition by the Mersey and Irwell Navigation Company who had objected to the bridge's construction because of the bridge pier in the centre of the river. This central pier was constructed by workers inside a cofferdam; workers were ferried between the pier and the river banks by boat. In April 1830, an overcrowded boat collided with the cofferdam and sank and eleven workers drowned.

The navigation company insisted that the bridge should clear the water by at least 8.8 metres (29 ft). The clearance meant that the railway line would be high above ground level on the Manchester bank and a brick viaduct was built to carry the line over Water Street governing the location of the platforms at Liverpool Road Station.

The bridge has "two segmental arches on a slightly skewed plan". Its span measures 66 feet (20 m). The bridge is built of sandstone with rusticated ashlar facings and radiating stonework that frames the arches and forms the spandrel panels. Horizontal stone courses make up the parapet and the pilasters of the central cutwater and span ends, and the coping and cornices are made of plainly dressed stonework.

On 15 September 1830, the bridge was opened, along with the L&MR line. During 1849 an adjacent two-span bridge was constructed to carry the Manchester South Junction and Altrincham Railway over the Irwell. Located to the south, it was built of masonry and follows a broadly similar alignment. During 1869, a plate-iron-girder viaduct, was constructed at an angle near to the bridge's northern side. The viaduct had a large circular cast-iron support column set on a central river pier. It has been demolished, although proposals for its reinstatement have been mooted.

Over time, the underside of the bridge has been covered by stalactites, some reportedly up to 230 mm (9.1 in) in length. They are the result of the moist environment leaching lime from mortar between the masonry blocks. Efforts to remove them have been conducted in the past.

During June 1988, the Manchester side of the rail bridge was designated a Grade I listed structure. The Salford end was not designated until February 2007. The bridge designated for its "special architectural and historic interest due to its early date, intactness, and design by George Stephenson, the nationally renowned railway engineer".

=== Ordsall Chord ===
To improve railway services in the north of England, the Northern Hub programme proposed a link between Victoria, Oxford Road and Piccadilly requiring the construction of a 1 kilometre (0.62 mi) link, the Ordsall Chord. A section of the chord is carried on a viaduct across the Irwell, where it bisects the Manchester end of the Irwell bridge approach and the original L&MR tracks into the Museum of Science & Industry (the former Liverpool Road Station, which was closed to traffic in 1975 and opened as a museum in 1983), severing the former station's connection to the railway network. The chord forms a curve that connects the Castlefield and Deal Street Junctions. Following legal challenges its construction was officially sanctioned. The viaduct that covered Irwell bridge's north-eastern face was demolished, revealing the bridge's full elevation. By October 2016, the arch soffits had been cleaned and all the stalactites removed.
