= High Speed UK =

High Speed UK (HSUK) is an advocacy group which proposes an alternative route to High Speed 2 that broadly incorporates the proposed Northern Powerhouse Rail (High Speed 3) scheme. Railway engineers Colin Elliff and Quentin Macdonald founded the group.

The HSUK proposal is not officially approved or funded by government. The scheme was launched in 2008, renamed in 2013 and received a parliamentary hearing in 2015.

== Proposed routes ==
According to the HSUK plan, there are 72 proposed services, as of August 2023. The routes are categorised into 7 service groupings.

Service group	Name	No. of routes	Source
S01	Crosscountry	14	
S02	Transpennine	15	
S03	North & Scotland	17	
S04	North-West Corridor	9	
S05	M1 Corridor	9	
S06	Great Western	-TBA-	
S07	Heathrow	8	

== Comparison with HS2 ==
The group claims various benefits of their plan compared to the proposals for HS2. This includes:

- The cost of HSUK is £20 billion less than current plans for HS2 and HS3.
- 94% of journeys are improved.
- 40% less travel time on average.
- 600 million tonnes of CO_{2} reduced.
- The Chilterns are bypassed.
- Most work involves improving existing infrastructure and restoring old lines, which is cheaper.
- The project is one that integrates new infrastructure with existing infrastructure.
- All principal UK cities are connected.
