= Bradford Interchange =

Railway station in West Yorkshire, England

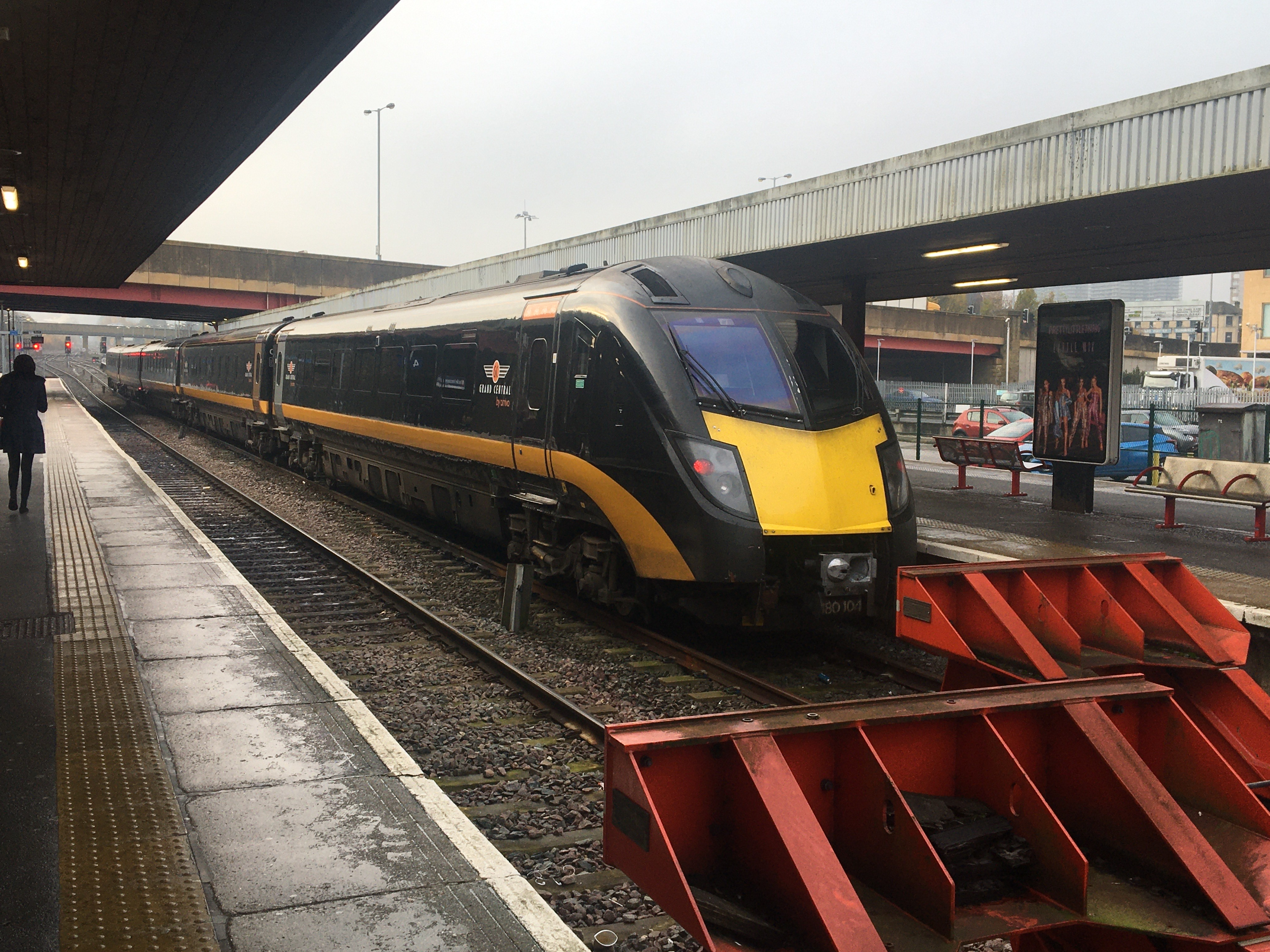
- A Grand Central Class 180 to London King's Cross at the station

General information
- Location: Bradford, City of Bradford; England
- Coordinates: 53.791°N 1.750°W
- Grid reference: SE165327
- Manager: Northern and Metro
- Transit authority: West Yorkshire (Metro)
- Platforms: 4

Other information
- Station code: BDI
- Fare zone: 3
- Classification: DfT category C1

Key dates
- 1973: Opened as Bradford Exchange
- 1977: Bus station opened
- 1983: Renamed as Bradford Interchange
- 2001: Bus station rebuilt

Passengers
- 2021/22: ▲1.762 million
- Interchange: ▲88,951
- 2022/23: ▲2.225 million
- Interchange: ▼69,528
- 2023/24: ▲2.329 million
- Interchange: ▲87,687
- 2024/25: ▲2.359 million
- Interchange: ▲89,871
- 2025/26: ▼2.325 million
- Interchange: ▲117,488
Location
Notes
- Passenger statistics from the Office of Rail and Road

Bradford Interchange is a transport interchange in Bradford, West Yorkshire, England, which consists of a railway station and bus station adjacent. The Interchange, which was designed in 1962, was hailed as a showpiece of European design and was opened on 14 January 1973. It is served by the majority of bus services in the city centre, while the railway station, which is one of two in the city centre (along with Bradford Forster Square), is served by Northern and is also the terminus for Grand Central services from London King's Cross.

== History ==
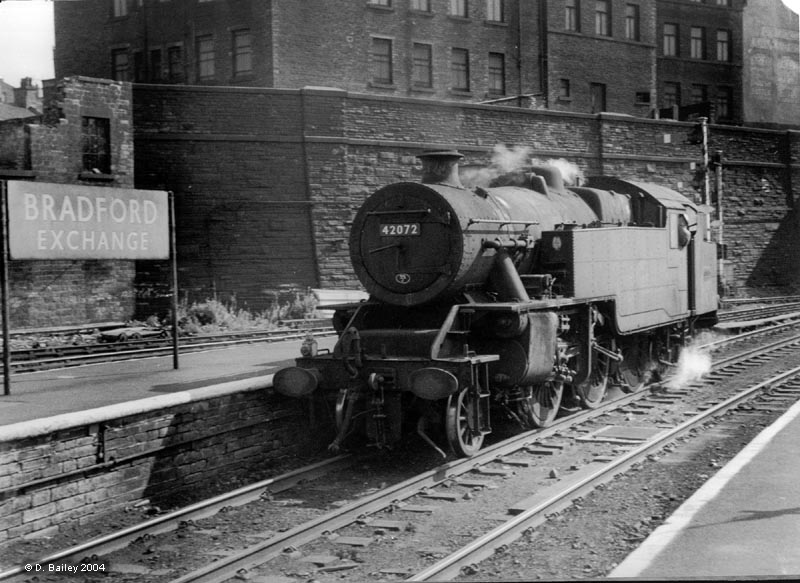
LMS Fairburn 2-6-4T 42072 at Bradford Exchange, 1966–67

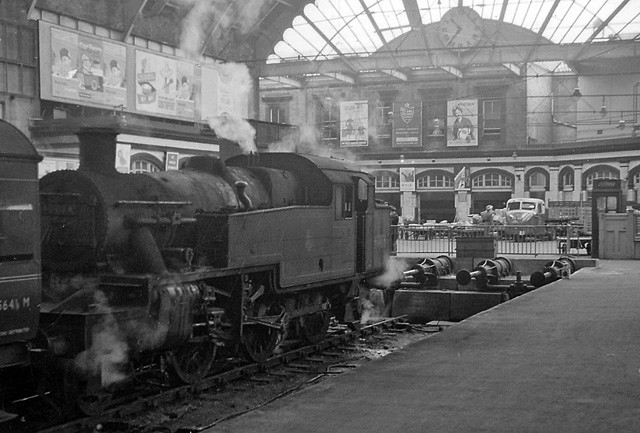
Internal view in 1961

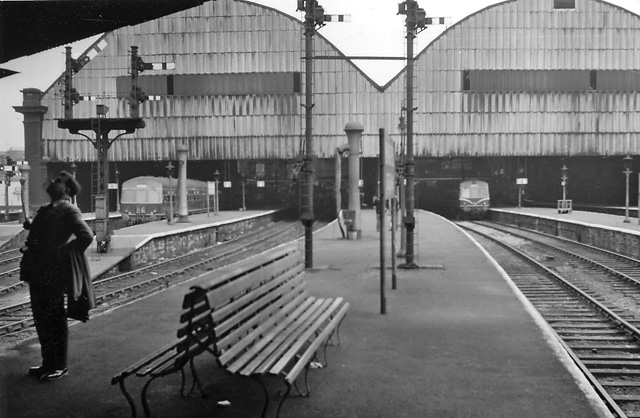
Platform view in 1961

Bradford Interchange bus terminal c. 1998, taken from the footbridge that connected the platforms. The green signs indicate departure bays. Note Keighley & District, First Bradford Traveller and WYPTE liveried buses.

The original railway station, named Bradford Exchange, was opened by the joint efforts of the Lancashire and Yorkshire Railway and the Great Northern Railway on 9 May 1850. In 1867, the Leeds, Bradford and Halifax Junction Railway, which had previously used Bradford Adolphus Street, built a link to the tracks into Exchange station to join the two existing companies; Adolphus Street station was then closed to passenger use.

The railway station was completely rebuilt on the same site in 1880 with ten bay platforms and two arched roofs. Constructed of wrought iron, these rested at the outer sides on plain stone walls and classical corinthian style columns down the middle. Glass covered the middle half and timber (inside)/ slate (outside) covered the outer quarters of each span. The four end screens were glazed in a fan pattern with decorative timber outer edging. The dimensions were a length of 450 feet (140 m), a width of 100 feet (30 m) for each arch and a height of 80 feet (24 m), track to apex. The railway station never had a formal frontage; instead, passengers entered by an opening in the northwest side.

In its 1920s heyday, it served routes to Wakefield Westgate via Ardsley (used by many of the city's through trains to London King's Cross), Wakefield Kirkgate via Batley and Ossett, Keighley & Halifax via Queensbury, Mirfield via Cleckheaton (the Spen Valley Line) and to Leeds via the Pudsey Loop in addition to the current lines. These however had all closed by the end of 1966 – most having fallen victim to the Beeching Axe.

By 1973, the railway station with its 10 platforms was deemed too large and was again rebuilt, this time on a different site slightly further south. The old Exchange station was demolished soon afterwards and was used for a time as a car park; the site now houses the Bradford Law Courts and is due to be developed as a 'Justice Quarter' with new magistrates' and coroner's courts. In 1977, a bus station was built alongside, and, in 1983, the station was renamed Bradford Interchange to link buses and trains in a covered environment.

The bus station featured a large ridge and furrow design of overall roof, which was subsequently demolished in 1999 to allow for a rebuilding of the bus station, which was opened in 2001. This was paid for partly by the sale of some adjacent land to the south of the site and some now-surplus land on the old bus station site. During the 1970s and 1980s, the station was considered the mainline station for Bradford with express services to London King's Cross, Trans-Pennine services to Liverpool and Newcastle and summer Saturday services to the South-West. The Inter-city services were moved to Forster Square station in 1992 when the line was electrified. The station also had an adjacent Red Star Parcels terminus but, like most other mainline stations following the privatisation of British Rail, it lost this facility during the 1990s.

The bus stands were once more plentiful and originally featured a large 'ridge and furrow' glass roof, but this was demolished in the 1990s, following the sale of some land for an office development. The bus station was completely rebuilt in 2001.

The information displays were replaced in early 2009, following a modest facelift in autumn 2008, which included new signage and a repaint. In January 2010, automatic ticket barriers were installed by Northern Rail.

Network Rail upgraded the track and signalling infrastructure on the Calder Valley line in October 2018. This saw the signal box at Mill Lane Junction closed (along with those at Halifax, Milner Royd Junction and Hebden Bridge), new signals installed and route control passed to the rail operating centre at York. The same scheme has also seen track and line speed improvements carried out, in order to reduce journey times to Manchester and Preston. At around the same time, Network Rail started work to extend the station platforms, due to take seven weeks.

On 4 January 2024, a large chunk of concrete was found to have fallen from the Interchange's underground car park ceiling, situated directly underneath the Interchange's bus station. As a result, the bus station was closed on 5 January, whilst survey work was conducted to repair the affected concrete and the bus station's structure.

As of 22 March it was announced that the bus station will be closed for a further three months until June to allow more extensive surveying work to take place, and to do further repairs to the station. All bus services starting/terminating at or moving through the bus station have been redirected to over 40 alternative bus stops around the city, to areas such as Market Street, Bridge Street and Hall Ings, all of which are within reasonable walking distance from the Interchange. The Interchange's train station remains open with rail services and ticket kiosks unaffected.

The bus station reopened in January, 2025.

== Layout and facilities ==
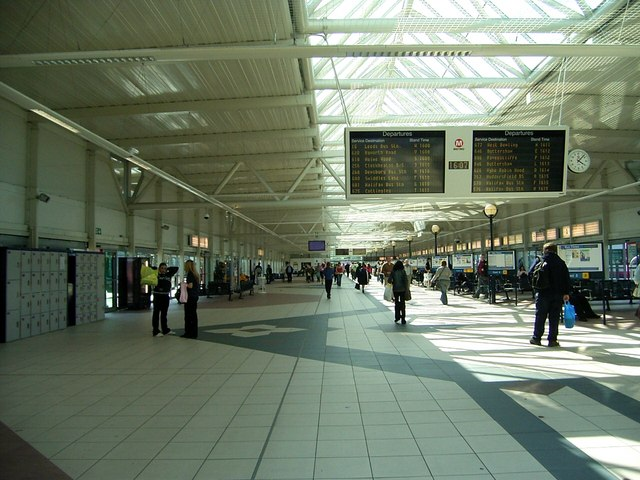
The bus station concourse at Bradford Interchange

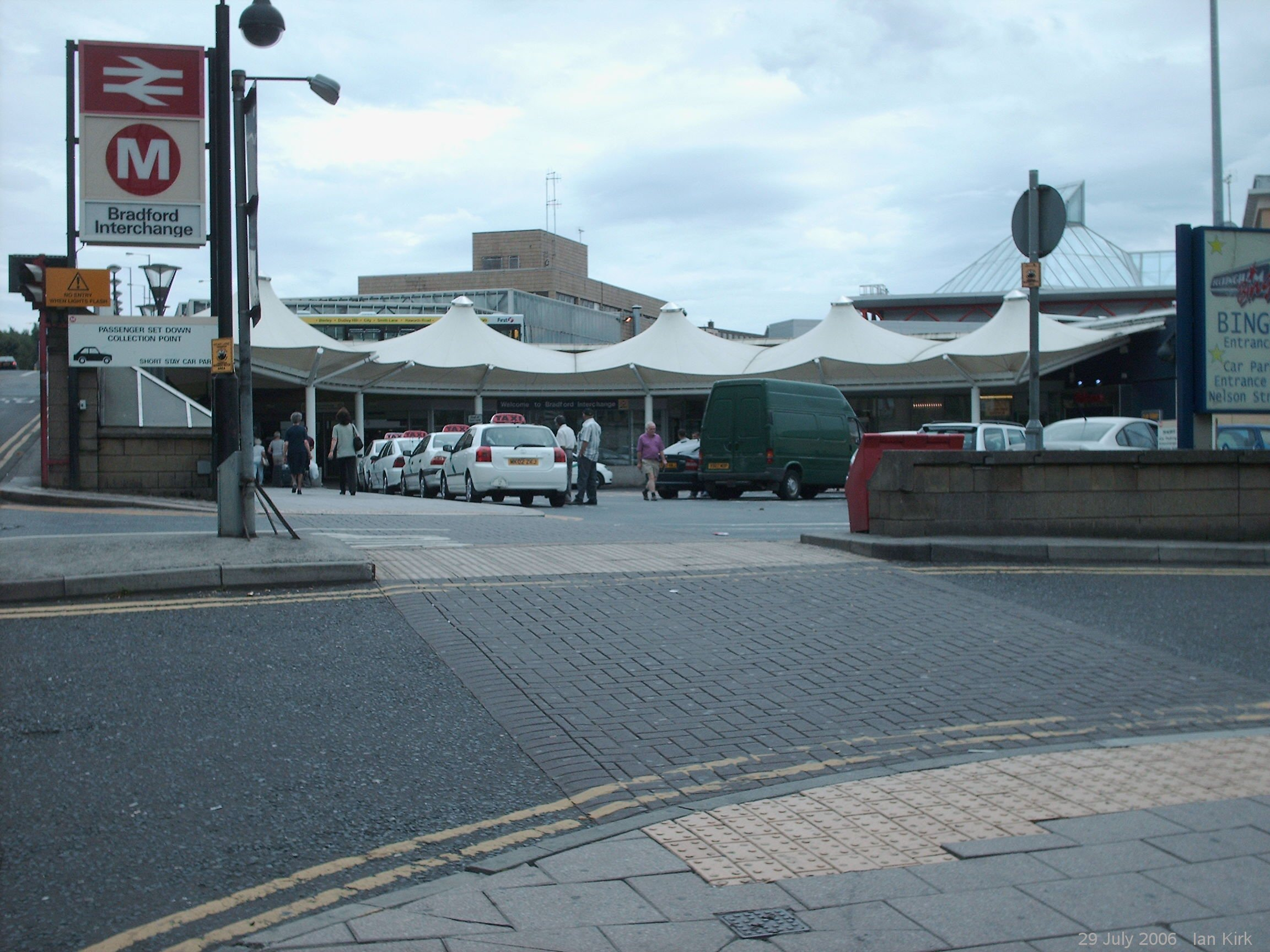
The car park and entrance

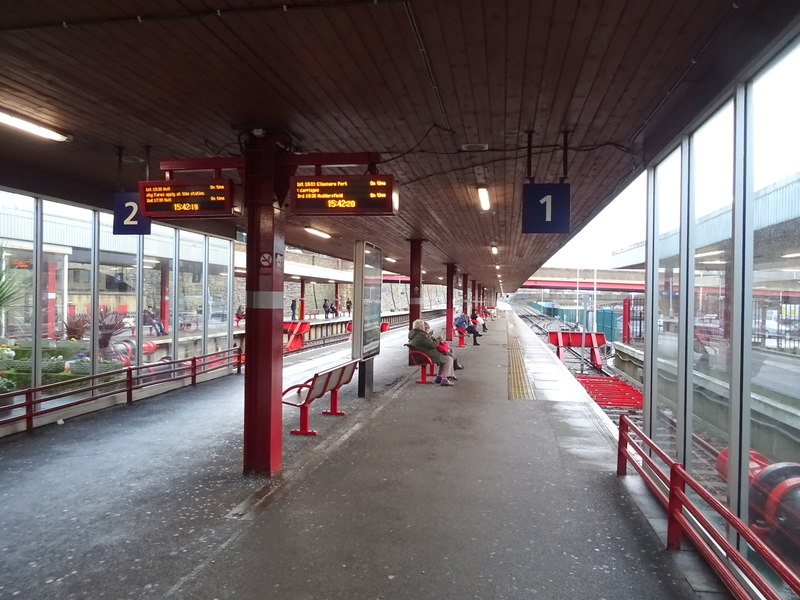
Platforms one and two with trains for Kingston upon Hull and Ellesmere Port scheduled.

The main entrance with the taxi rank and car park is on a lower level, while the train platforms and bus stops are on a split upper level, both separate with pedestrian access. Downstairs, in the central concourse, there are a few shops, a newsagent, a cafe and sandwich shop and a fast food outlet on the train platforms, where hot drinks are also available. Toilets are located off the main concourse.

There is also a British Transport Police office and lost luggage desk, provided for passengers' concern and safety at the railway station, with a separate security and lost-luggage unit for bus travellers, on the bus concourse. A smoking ban is observed in all parts of Bradford interchange, and CCTV is also in operation with security officers and police regularly patrolling the station.

The railway station has four platforms and a short bay that was previously used for the Red Star parcels facility. Platform 1 has a run-round facility for locomotive-hauled trains (mainly freight services). The track layout and associated signalling was remodelled during the course of a week-long engineering blockade from 25 October to 3 November 2008, to permit higher speeds on both routes into the station, and also allow trains to approach the station from both Leeds and Halifax simultaneously (something that was not possible with the old track configuration).

All tracks run south out of the station about 600m to the Mill Lane junction where the westbound and eastbound routes separate. Originally it was possible for trains on the Calder Valley line to bypass the station, but that possibility was removed when the diversionary track was lifted.

=== Ticket offices ===
Bradford Interchange has separate bus and train ticket outlets. The bus and Metro office, which also deals with National Express coach enquiries from a separate desk, is located on the bus departure concourse. The train ticket office is next to the pedestrian entrance to the train platforms and is open seven days a week (except for late evenings). Escalators and lifts link the two levels and there is step-free access to all platforms.

== Services ==
=== Bus ===
The bus station is managed by Metro. The main operators at the bus station include First West Yorkshire and Arriva Yorkshire with other services run by Keighley Bus Company and TLC Travel. The Flyer service operates to Leeds Bradford Airport, Otley and Harrogate.

Local bus services run to many destinations, including Dewsbury, Halifax, Harrogate, Huddersfield, Ilkley, Keighley, Leeds, Otley and Wakefield, as well as services to towns within the Bradford area, such as Shipley, Baildon and Wilsden.

National Express Coaches run nationwide from Bradford but no longer from the interchange, they stop at a bus stop on nearby Nelson Street.

=== Rail ===
Bradford Interchange is on the Calder Valley Line and is one of the two railway stations serving the city of Bradford. The other station is Forster Square, a 10-minute walk away.

Monday to Saturday during the daytime, services run every 15 minutes between the Interchange and Leeds and hourly onwards to both York and Hull (the latter introduced at the winter 2019 timetable change). On evenings and Sundays, there are usually three services to Leeds each hour, with one extended to both York and Hull (though the latter doesn't run on Sundays).

In the other direction, there is a train roughly every 15 minutes to Halifax, with two trains an hour continuing to Manchester Victoria (one limited stop, the other serving all stations to Todmorden, then Rochdale only), one to Preston and Blackpool North via Blackburn and one to Huddersfield (plus one that terminates at Halifax). Since the summer 2019 timetable update, there is now an hourly direct service to Warrington Bank Quay and Chester. Whilst the TRU project is ongoing, the Huddersfield service is diverted from Brighouse to Dewsbury and Leeds, with a replacement shuttle bus between Brighouse and Huddersfield (though still on the same hourly frequency).

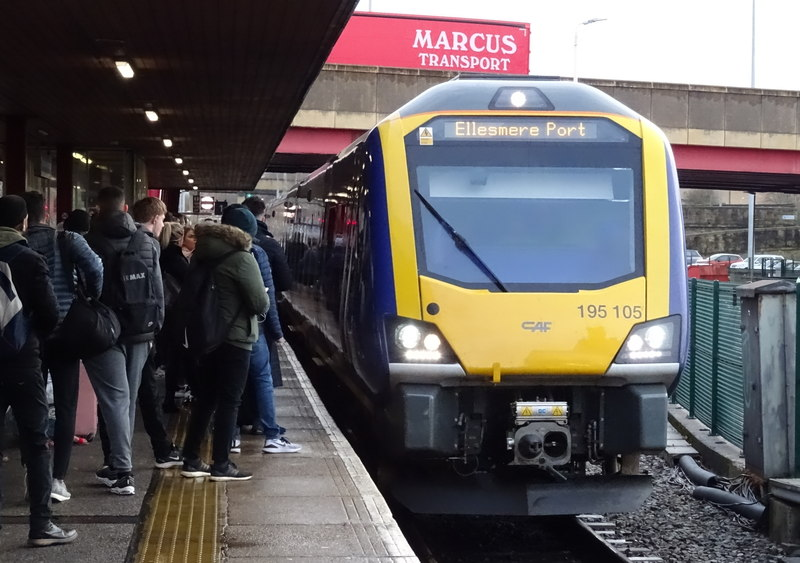
British Rail Class 195 in service at Bradford Interchange

Sundays, there are four services each hour to Halifax – these continue to either Manchester Victoria (two, one continuing to Chester), Blackpool North via Preston or Huddersfield (hourly to each).

Because of the geography of Bradford, the station was built as a terminus, with the lines in a 'Y'-formation, so trains must reverse out of the station to continue their journey.

==== London services ====
The station now also sees regular services to London King's Cross via Low Moor, Halifax, Brighouse, Mirfield, Wakefield, Pontefract and Doncaster. In January 2009, Grand Central had its application for train paths to run a Bradford Interchange to London service accepted by the Office of Rail Regulation. Four trains per day operate, now that full approval for the service has been granted; these use Class 180 units and started running from 23 May 2010.

Preceding station	National Rail	Following station
Low Moor	Northern; Caldervale Line	New Pudsey
Halifax	Northern; Caldervale Line	New Pudsey
Low Moor	Grand Central Caldervale Line	Terminus
	Disused railways	
Bowling Junction	L&Y	St Dunstans
	Future services	
Manchester Piccadilly	TBA; Northern Powerhouse Rail	Leeds

== Ongoing improvements ==
Further improvements under the National Station Improvement Plan are proposed, which include refurbished canopies, new flooring, more lighting and CCTV, a new waiting room and extra seating.

Under Network Rail's Northern Hub development, the Northern franchise, which commenced in April 2016, will reintroduce services to Liverpool and new services to Nottingham via Sheffield, Manchester Airport and Chester have been announced. These form part of the "Northern Connect" network and use Class 195s that were delivered in 2018.

Network Rail and Transport for North are currently working on plans for a high-speed rail stop in Bradford either in the city centre or a parkway station. This has been campaign as part of the Northern Powerhouse Rail Project.

In March 2021, as part of the Northern Powerhouse Rail scheme it was announced that should the Government back the route via Bradford, that a new station would be built at St James's Market to replace the existing Bradford Interchange. However the Government effectively scrapped this idea in October 2026 by announcing that a new Bradford Interchange station would be built on its existing site in the 2030s.

== See also ==
- Bradford Crossrail
