= Bradford St James railway station =

Proposed railway station in West Yorkshire, England

Coordinates: 53.789°N 1.742°W

Bradford St James railway station is a proposed railway station which would be constructed in the vicinity of St James Market in Bradford, West Yorkshire, England. This would replace the current terminus station at Bradford Interchange with a through layout as part of Northern Powerhouse Rail enabling faster journeys from Bradford to Leeds and Manchester.

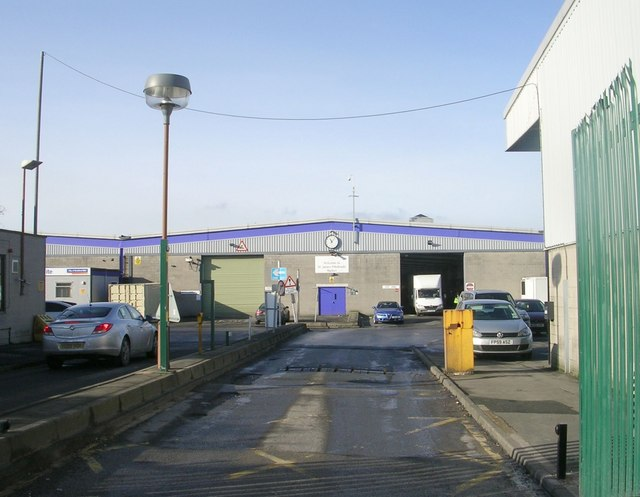
The proposed site would be at St James Wholesale Market.

== Progress ==
In November 2023 the UK Government awarded £400,000 towards masterplan development for the station. The upgrade of the line, and the funds to build the new station, are expected to cost £2 billion, with money released from the cancelled phases of the HS2 project.
