= Sandra's Wedding =

British alternative rock group

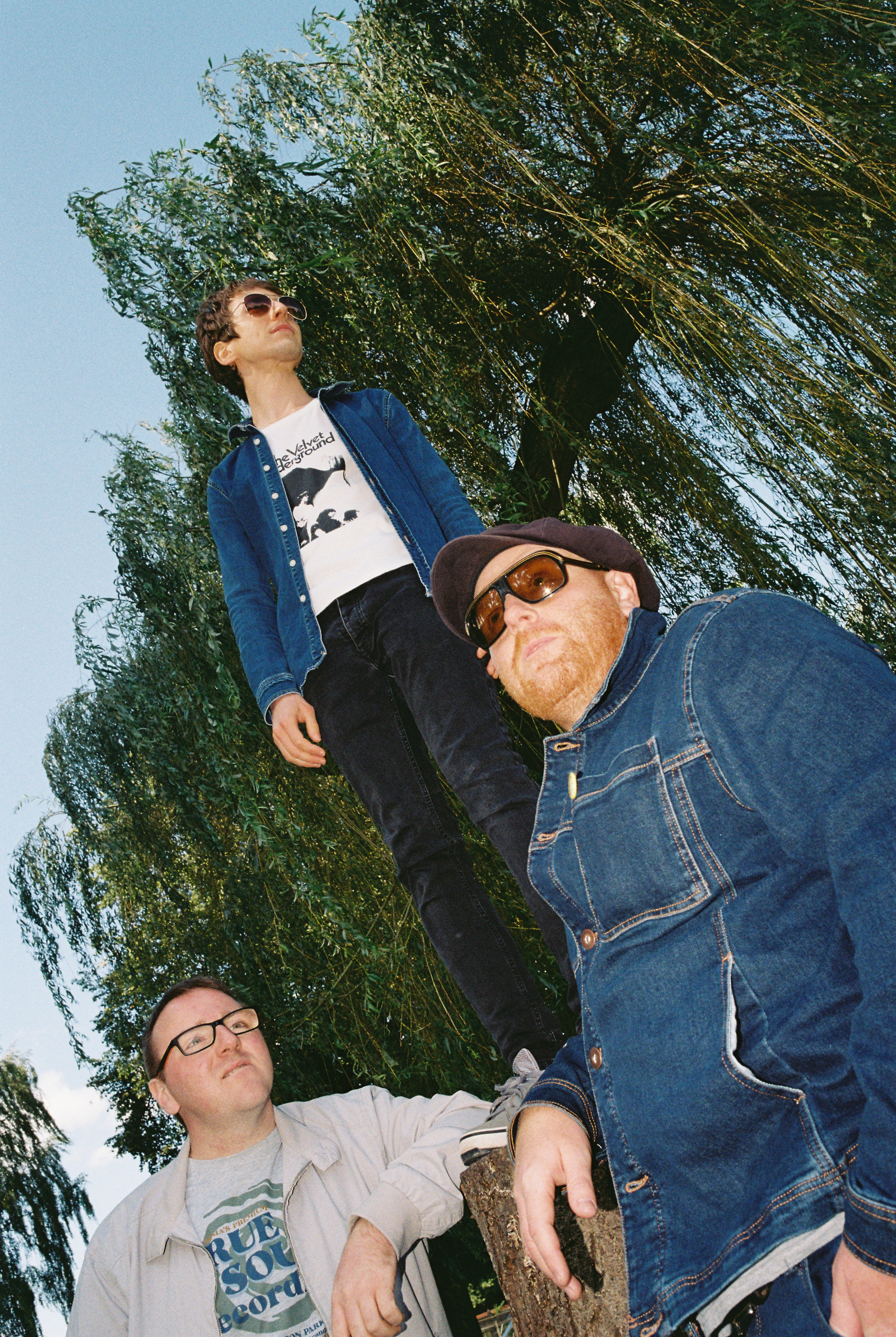
- Sandra's Wedding in 2024

Background information
- Origin: Goole, East Riding of Yorkshire, England
- Genres: Alternative rock, jangle pop, pop rock
- Years active: 2015–present
- Members: Joe Hodgson, Jonny Hughes, Luke Harrison
- Past members: Tom Hill

Sandra's Wedding are a three piece alternative rock group from Goole, East Riding of Yorkshire. They are made up of members Joe Hodgson (vocals), Jonny Hughes (guitars) and Luke Harrison (drums). They released their first album physically and digitally on 14 February 2017 entitled Northern Powerhouse. The band's sound and musical themes address love, loss and life in industrial towns across the North of England, with guitarist Jonny Hughes telling one newspaper that the band try to write songs about things that they can identify with, residing and experiencing life in Northern, working class areas.

Several reviews and articles on the band questioned the origin of the unusual name, with singer/songwriter Joe Hodgson explaining that the band had struggled for a name initially, but hoped that the name evoked a certain kind of person, or specifically a woman, who may have a story to tell.

With the release of Northern Powerhouse, the band gained attention in the press and on radio after the MP for the Northern Powerhouse Andrew Percy commented on the album, stating that after hearing it he enjoyed it so he would try and mention it in Parliament if possible. The band described this as a "bizarre twist" due to the album's political themes of austerity and working class strife, explaining how they did not expect the demographic to be Conservative politicians, and expressed their surprise.

The album received initial praise for its "dramatic, powerful vocals" and the way Hodgson's lyrics dealt with heavy subject matter with wit and variety. The sound of the band and the jangly guitars evoke comparisons to bands from the 1980s such as The Smiths and The Housemartins, while others likened the record to having an upbeat feel with an indie folk sound reminiscent of Fleetwood Mac. Another review described it as being a tight recording and praised the record's production.

The band's second album, Frame Yourself, was released in March 2020, followed later that year by Banana Bread, an album recorded entirely during the COVID-19 lockdown.

In 2021, they released a compilation of singles and previous album tracks, Our Previous Leaf, in 2021, to raise money for local charity The Moorlands Community Charity after it suffered a spate of break-ins. Sandra's Wedding's fourth album, mini-album Pleasure Grounds, followed in late 2021, before the release of The Hopeful Boy Replacement Service in August 2023.

In 2024 the band contributed a song to the BBC sitcom Alma's Not Normal, created by Sophie Willan. "Jupiter Song" appeared in the episode The Black and White Movie and was performed by Richard (Craig Parkinson) with the band's own version played over the closing credits.

== Discography ==
=== Studio albums ===
- Northern Powerhouse (2017)
- Frame Yourself (2020)
- Banana Bread (2020)
- Please Grounds (2021)
- The Hopeful Boy Replacement Service (2023)

=== EPs ===
- Good Morning, Bad Blood (2018)
- Another Rugby League Town (2023)

=== Compilation albums ===
- Our Previous Leaf (2021)

=== Singles ===
- "Spite Christmas" (2017)
