= Ordsall Chord =

Railway line in Salford, England

Coordinates: 53.47842°N 2.26033°W

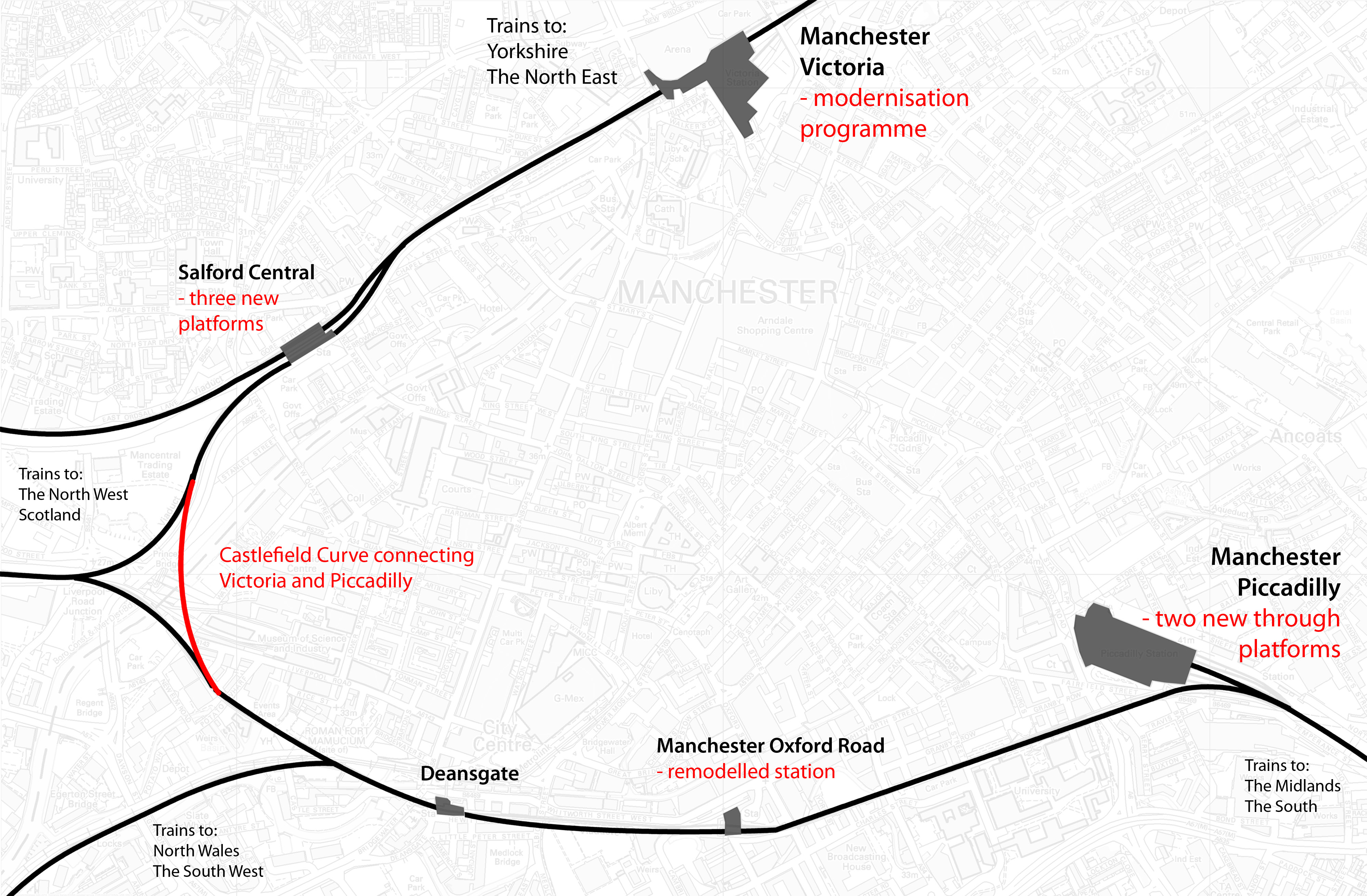
- Schematic map showing the Ordsall Chord (also known as the Castlefield Curve) marked in red

Overview
- Status: Complete
- Owner: Network Rail
- Locale: Greater Manchester, England

Service
- Type: Heavy rail
- System: National Rail

History
- Opened: 10 December 2017

Technical
- Track gauge: 4 ft 8 1/2 in (1,435 mm)

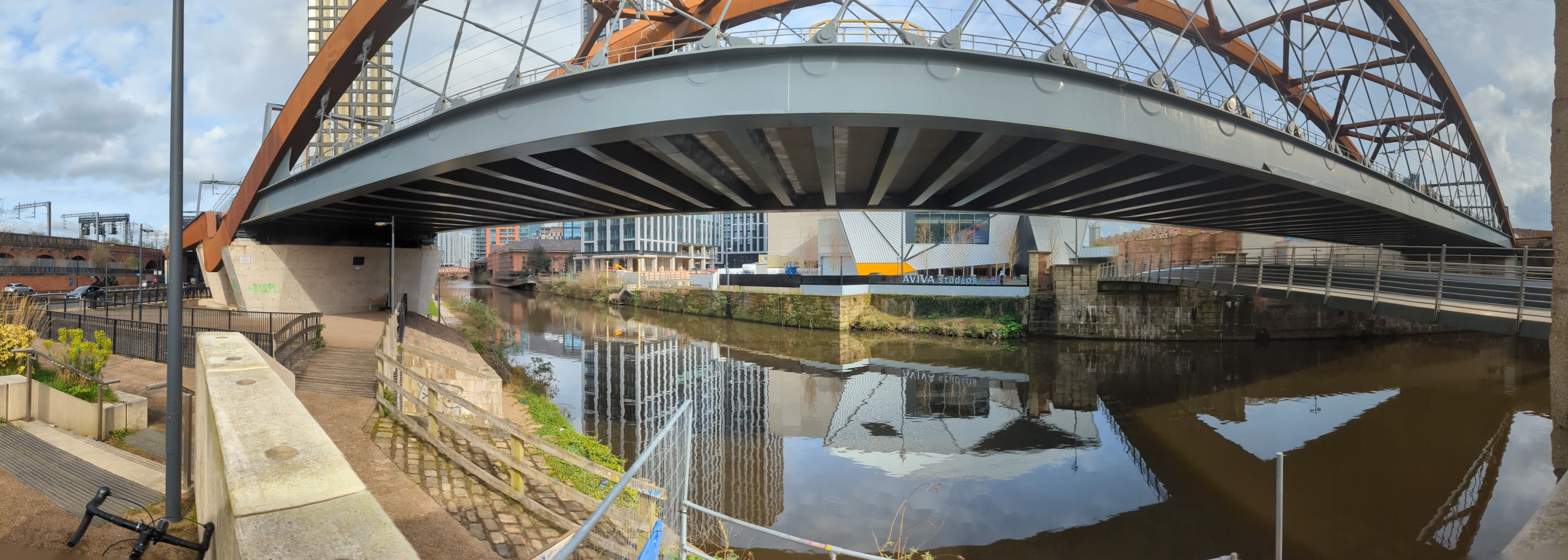
Panoramic view of the completed Ordsall Chord with the River Irwell, Aviva studios and the Prince's bridge in 2024

Ordsall Chord, also known as the Castlefield Curve, is a short railway line in Ordsall, Salford, England, which links Manchester Piccadilly and Manchester Oxford Road to Manchester Victoria, designed to increase capacity and reduce journey times into and through Manchester. It allows trains to run from Leeds, Newcastle and Redcar Central direct to Manchester Airport.

A chord was proposed in the late-1970s and legal powers for its construction were received in an act of Parliament in 1979, but the project was cancelled. Network Rail revived the proposal in 2010 as part of its Northern Hub proposal. Funding for its construction totalling £85 million was announced in the 2011 United Kingdom budget and construction commenced in 2016. It became operational on 10 December 2017.

Its use since becoming operational has been limited as no additional capacity at Victoria, Oxford Road and Piccadilly has been built to cope with more through services.

== Background ==
By the late 20th century, the rail network in Manchester could not support demand. The main stations at Piccadilly and Victoria were not linked and many trains terminated at Victoria taking up excessive platform space. One solution, the Picc-Vic tunnel between the stations, was proposed in the 1970s but rejected on cost grounds in 1977.

A curve at Ordsall linking Piccadilly to Victoria was proposed in the late 1970s when it was known as the Castlefield Curve after the nearby district. A bill relating to its proposed construction was debated in the House of Commons in June 1979, receiving some support but it was opposed on the grounds that a tunnel would provide a better alternative. By the end of the year, British Rail had received powers in an act of Parliament to construct the line. It was estimated to cost around £10 million but following opposition from local politicians and a shortage of funding, the project was never started. By 1985 it had been abandoned.

The proposal was included in a draft Network Rail report in 2005 as a solution to overcrowding in the region, at an expected cost of £44 million. In February 2010, the project was revived by Network Rail as part of the Manchester Hub Study, with the intention of receiving government funding by around 2014. On 23 March 2011 George Osborne, the Chancellor of the Exchequer, announced £85 million funding for the scheme in the 2011 budget. The announcement was unexpected and was welcomed by the Greater Manchester Integrated Transport Authority.

== Proposal ==
The Ordsall Chord provides a direct link between Piccadilly and Victoria stations, allowing trains from Manchester Victoria and the east to continue to Piccadilly. Following completion of the chord, in theory four trains per hour will travel between Manchester Airport/Manchester Piccadilly and Manchester Victoria in each direction, and associated reorganisation of train paths and retimetabling will provide eight trains per hour from Manchester Victoria towards the west via Chat Moss, and six trains per hour from Manchester Piccadilly towards either Chat Moss or Bolton and Preston (trains from both Victoria and Piccadilly stations to the west and north west (Chat Moss, Liverpool, Bolton, Preston, etc.) do not actually pass over the Ordsall Chord, both ends of which lead eastwards, but travel over pre-existing track).

The chord is part of the larger Northern Hub project, proposed by Network Rail in the Manchester Hub Study of 2010. The complete scheme would cost around £530 million to implement. The Ordsall Chord will cost £85 million and will allow around 700 extra trains per day to operate into Manchester. Most through trains on TransPennine Express (TPE) routes to Leeds, Newcastle and Liverpool Lime Street will be re-routed via Victoria rather than Piccadilly but some TPE services to Leeds, Liverpool and Newcastle will continue to run via Piccadilly and will stop at Ashburys and/or Gorton and Guide Bridge. The current fast North TransPennine services will operate via Victoria reducing journey times.

The full scheme includes new through platforms at Piccadilly and track improvements outside Manchester to allow fast expresses to overtake slower stopping trains, reducing journey times to Leeds by 14 minutes on average and to Liverpool by 17. Railfreight access to yards in the Trafford Park area will be improved.

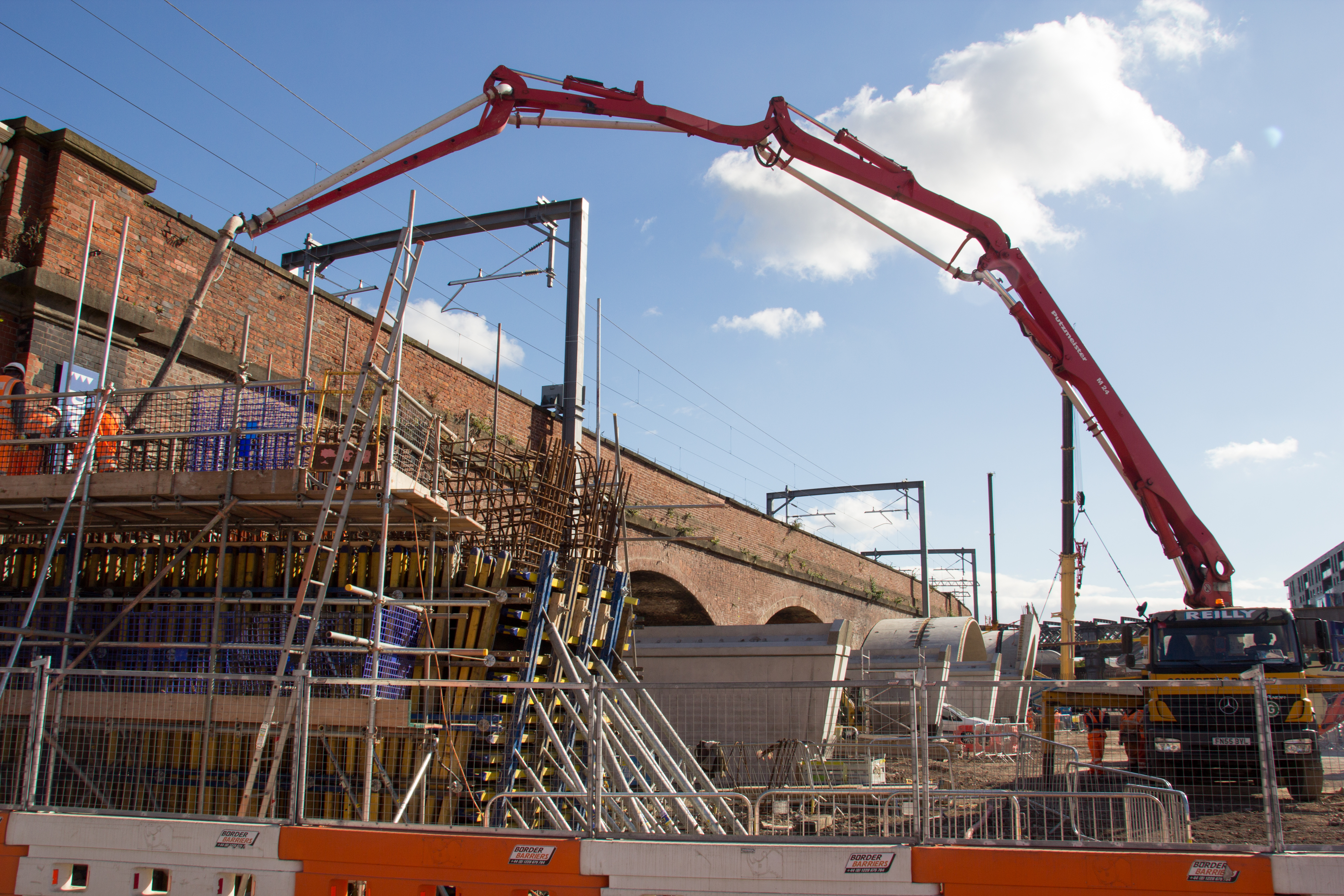
Construction of the Ordsall Chord in October 2016

The chord will preserve connectivity between the relocated east–west services and the city's main rail interchange at Manchester Piccadilly. It will improve access to Manchester Airport which cannot be reached easily from Victoria. Without the chord, such operations would require trains to be run to Salford Crescent and then reverse.

Concern was raised about the impact the scheme will have on the historic Grade I listed 1830 railway bridge over the River Irwell, part of the Liverpool & Manchester Railway's original approach to Manchester Liverpool Road railway station, (now the site of the Science & Industry Museum (SIM)), which lies in the path of construction.

Detailed designs were presented by Network Rail in November 2012, followed in May by the intended planning application, for submission at the end of August 2013. The plan proposed avoiding the Stephenson Bridge to cross the river on a network arch bridge but severing the museum's main-line rail connection immediately to the east of the bridge, ending the museum's out-and-back live steam trips using a replica of one of Stephenson's 1830 Planet-class locomotives. According to Network Rail, "The removal of this connection is not something that Network Rail takes lightly, and we have explored many alternative solutions before reaching the conclusion that the connection would need to be removed to make way for the chord." The museum opposed the alignment, claiming that it would have "a damaging effect on SIM visitors, volunteers and income."

== Construction ==
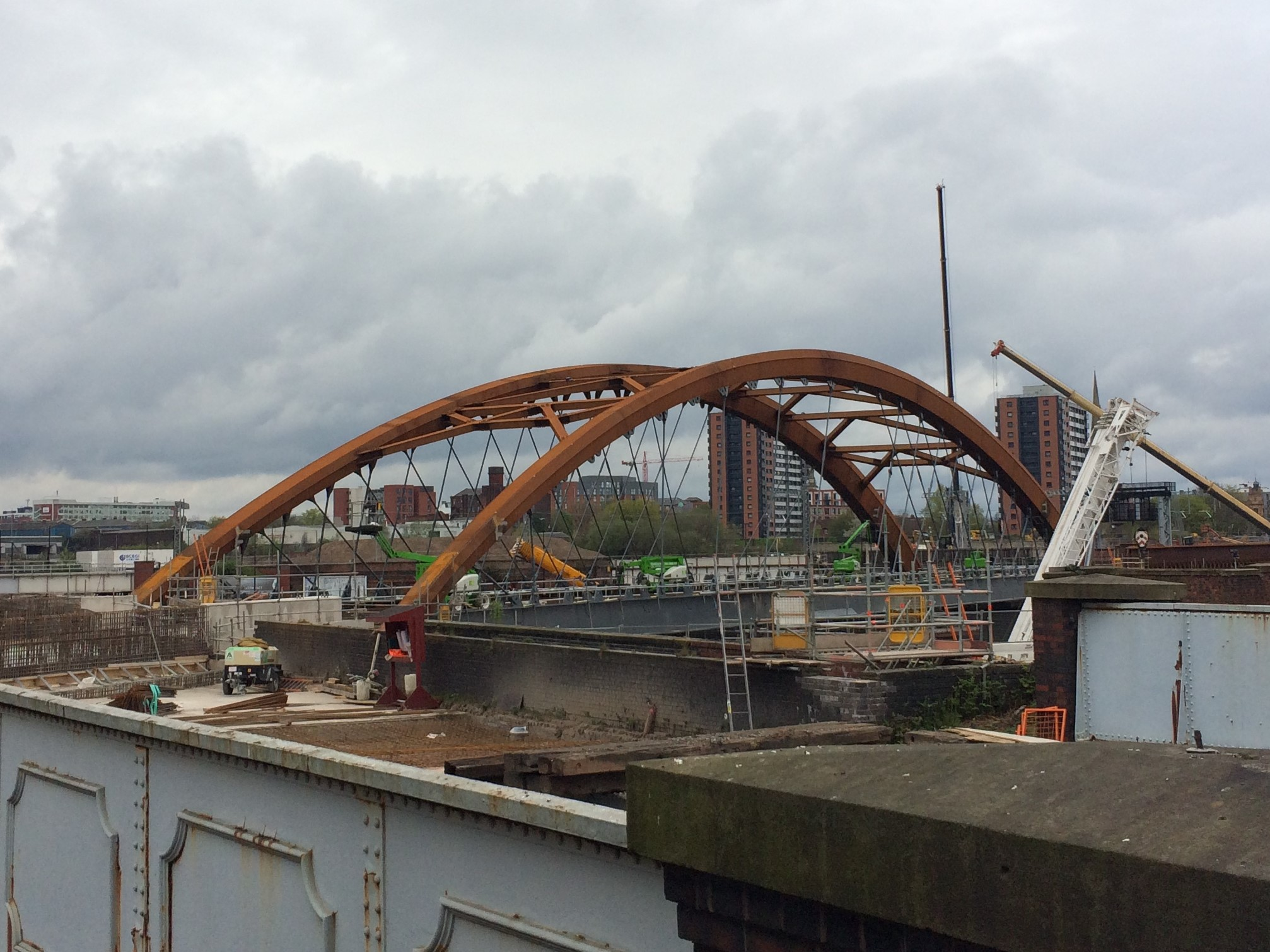
Ordsall Chord under construction in April 2017

Network Rail submitted the Transport and Works Act application to construct the Ordsall Chord in September 2013. The statutory instrument authorising construction was made on 31 March 2015, and preparatory works began in October 2015. In January 2016, Network Rail began work on the foundations with a planned completion date of late 2017. In November 2016, Network Rail announced they expected services to run to Manchester Airport from December 2017 and electric trains to run between Manchester and Preston via Bolton with new connections into Manchester from the Calder Valley. 2018 will see the introduction of an hourly direct service from Newcastle to Manchester Airport, which will also mean an extra hourly service between Leeds and Newcastle, and six trains an hour between Manchester Victoria and Rochdale.

Mark Whitby, civil engineer and former President of the Institution of Civil Engineers, appealed against the decision to approve its construction in the High Court. On 14 October 2015, the High Court rejected his appeal and denied Whitby the right to appeal the decision. Whitby did appeal and on 11 January 2016, the Court of Appeal granted Leave to Appeal saying "The grounds of appeal raise important points and have real prospects of success". Whitby wanted an alternative that would not sever the main-line rail connection to the Museum of Science and Industry, nor destroy heritage structures. The case was heard in March 2016 but Whitby's appeal was rejected.

The 600-tonne (660-ton) network arch was lifted into place on 21 February 2017.

== Operation ==
The first passenger service was at 08:40 on 10 December 2017: Manchester Victoria to Manchester Oxford Road followed by the return service continuing to Leeds.

It was envisaged that congestion at Manchester Piccadilly would reduce by a quarter, in part due to the reduced need for trains to cross the throat of the station, blocking other services. It was hoped there would be more frequent train services through Manchester.

However this has not yet materialised, particularly after the May 2018 timetable which created widespread disruption around Manchester. The Ordsall Chord's lack of use in comparison to its £100 million cost has been attributed to a lack of capacity at Piccadilly, Oxford Road and Victoria to cope with increased 'through' services that the Chord generates.

Chief Executive of Network Rail, Andrew Haines, remarked upon the inadequacies of the infrastructure to support the Ordsall Chord as part of a review in Network Rail's operations:

"The Ordsall Chord is a classic example of a fantastic piece of infrastructure which has unlocked great new journey opportunities ... but where the new infrastructure was not supported by a sufficiently rigorous operating plan. Nobody really looked at how we would reliably operate 15 trains an hour, across six flat junctions in the space of a few miles, with disparate rolling stock, much of which will have travelled for several hours picking up potential delay on the way."

In January 2021, the UK government published proposals to deal with congestion on the Castlefield corridor through Manchester Oxford Road and Piccadilly. One option would reduce the use of the Ordsall Chord to one train each way every hour.

== See also ==
- Northern Hub
- Northern Powerhouse
- Windsor Link
