= Northern Powerhouse =

British government proposal to boost economic growth in the North of England

The Northern Powerhouse was a proposal to boost economic growth in the North of England by the 2010–2015 coalition government and 2015–2016 Conservative government in the United Kingdom, particularly in the "Core Cities" of Hull, Manchester, Liverpool, Leeds, Sheffield and Newcastle. The proposal was based on the benefits of agglomeration and aimed to reposition the British economy away from London and the South East, where most of the UK's wealth was historically concentrated. The spatial footprint of the Northern Powerhouse was defined as the 11 local enterprise partnership areas of the North of England.

The proposal involved improvement to transport links, investment in science and innovation, and devolution of powers in City Deals. Former MP for Stockton South James Wharton was appointed as minister responsible for the proposal in May 2015. A 2018 investigation by The Guardian indicated he rarely left London to visit the northern areas, however.

In October 2015, during General Secretary of the Chinese Communist Party Xi Jinping's visit to the UK, Prime Minister David Cameron announced that the Northern Powerhouse proposal had "Chinese backing".

Under the government of Theresa May who became Prime Minister in July 2016, it was alleged that the focus on the North was to be downgraded into a nationwide agenda for boosting productivity outside the south-east. However, she subsequently contradicted this, pledging to "help the great cities and towns of the North pool their strengths and take on the world".

In September 2016, one of the main architects of the Northern Powerhouse project, Lord O'Neill, resigned from the Government and quit the Conservative benches in the upper house.

== Transport improvements ==
Transport for the North (TfN) was formed in April 2018 as the first statutory sub-national transport body in the UK. Working with central government and local and national transport bodies, TfN aims to develop and deliver strategic transport infrastructure across the North of England.

Proposed transport improvements include Northern Powerhouse Rail (otherwise known as High Speed 3) and the ongoing work of the Northern Hub to remove a railway bottleneck around Manchester and provide faster connections across the North of England.

In June 2015, the government suspended electrification of the Midland Main Line from London to Sheffield, and the TransPennine route between Manchester and Leeds amid spiraling costs and missed targets just weeks after winning the 2015 election.

In December 2015, the Government awarded the two rail franchises in the North of England from April 2016 onwards, the Northern and TransPennine Express franchises. These franchises will come with £1.2 billion of investment in more than 500 brand-new carriages, 2,000 extra services a week, free wi-fi on trains and at stations. The outdated diesel powered Pacer trains will also be removed from the network in 2020. The co-management of the franchises will be undertaken by Transport for the North and Government from April 2018, transferring the functions from Rail North.

In August 2016, it was reported that proposals for a road tunnel underneath the Pennines to cut journey times by 30 minutes between Manchester and Sheffield, were being advanced. If completed, it would be the world's longest road tunnel.

In July 2017 Secretary of State for Transport Chris Grayling, said that it is unlikely that the railway line between Manchester and Leeds will be fully electrified. He also cast doubt on whether the planned two extra through platforms at Manchester Piccadilly station would be built. It was also announced that the electrification plan of the Midland Main Line was to be scrapped and InterCity Express Trains ordered would be changed to less efficient bi-mode trains with diesel engines added to run on non-electrified lines.

In February 2017 research by the Institute for Public Policy Research showed that actual or planned expenditure on transport infrastructure per head of population was £1,943 in London and £427 in the north of England.

=== Completed projects ===
In January 2016, the new southern entrance to Leeds station opened, allowing commuters travelling south to reduce their journey times from the station, as well as a new concourse and cycle storage.

In December 2017, the Ordsall Chord linking Manchester Piccadilly and Manchester Victoria opened.

== Science and innovation ==
Projects include the National Graphene Institute, Square Kilometre Array and National Biologics Industrial Innovation Centre.

== Arts ==
Manchester received a new arts centre named The Factory (after Factory Records). Announced in 2015 as part of Northern Powerhouse, it was initially due to open in 2019 at cost of £110 million. Finally opening in 2023 at a cost of £241 million, it was the UK’s largest investment in a national cultural project since Tate Modern, which opened in 2000.

In April 2016 the Government launched The Great Exhibition of the North, investing "£5 Million towards the exhibition with an additional £15 million into a legacy fund to attract further cultural investment in the Northern Powerhouse".

== Technology ==
In March 2017, a delegation of 30 digital and technology leaders from the North of England visited San Francisco, home of tech companies including Facebook, Apple and Uber, on a Northern Powerhouse trade mission. The trip was coordinated by MC2, a Northern Powerhouse partner, and the delegation was led by Professor Adam Beaumont, founder and CEO of telecoms operator aql. The flight marked the first ever direct service from the North to San Francisco and the only such route outside of London in the UK.

The trip resulted in a new partnership between aql and CircleLoop, a smart online phone system provider. Links were also forged with incubation experts, including Rocketspace.

== Northern Powerhouse Partnership ==
The Northern Powerhouse Partnership (NPP) was launched in September 2016 as the leading voice of business and civic leaders across the North. NPP is chaired by the former Chancellor George Osborne who backed the Northern Powerhouse as a concept and who coined the phrase itself in a keynote speech in June 2014. Its vice-chairs are Lord Jim O'Neill, one of the original architects of the Northern Powerhouse vision, and leading industrialist Professor Juergen Maier CBE, former CEO of Siemens UK.

NPP is business-led and fosters collaboration between places and national government, working together on evidence-based objectives which can make the biggest impact to deliver sustainable growth and to improve quality of life. Its membership is made up of the North’s leading businesses, including Bruntwood, TalkTalk, Co-op, Mace, Arup, Arcadis, Barclays, HSBC, Drax, Virgin Money and Sellafield.

The first Northern Powerhouse Partnership (NPP) report was released in January 2017. The report outlined a plan to grow the region's economy by £100bn and create 850,000 jobs. Since then, NPP has published a number of reports into its key priorities, including Educating the North and the 'HS2 and the economy of the North'.

NPP has campaigned extensively for the full delivery of both HS2 and Northern Powerhouse Rail, securing a promise from Prime Minister Boris Johnson in February 2020 that "both are needed, and both will be built." It has also called for more powers to be devolved to Metro Mayors, including in skills, transport and health.

== Northern Powerhouse Partner Programme ==
The Northern Powerhouse Partner Programme is a government initiative made up of businesses from across the North, from international organisations with a Northern presence to SMEs and from a variety of sectors. The aim of the programme is to showcase activity, from apprenticeship opportunities to clean growth initiatives, highlighting business success across the Northern Powerhouse.

== Devolution ==
The first Metro Mayors were elected in 2017 as part of then-Chancellor George Osborne’s plan to decentralise power away from Whitehall through a series of devolution deals signed between 2014 and 2020. Metro Mayors oversee a number of local authority areas across a ‘combined authority’ (usually with a city at its core), creating a new tier of government between Westminster and local councils.

== In popular culture ==
In February 2017 Goole band Sandra's Wedding released an album named Northern Powerhouse, inspired by the policies and political implications of the project. It was discussed in the Press and praised by then Northern Powerhouse Minister Andrew Percy prior to his resignation from the post in June 2017. In August 2019 Northern Powerhouse Minister Jake Berry announced the Northern Powerhouse Partnership scheme exceeded 300 members.

== Criticism ==
Professor Neil Lee of the London School of Economics commented that while he was "sympathetic to the basic idea", the Northern Powerhouse was "a vague and problematic concept". His assessment was that it had attracted new resources but was "geographically fuzzy with insufficient funding to achieve its unclear aims".

In 2019, Andy Burnham, mayor of Greater Manchester, told the BBC the project was at risk of "fizzling out". The think tank IPPR North noted both positive and negative results for the Northern Powerhouse. IPPR pointed out a number of achievements: there were now five new "metro mayors" and a regional transport body - Transport for the North; employment had increased 7%, compared to the UK average of just over 6%; there were 34,520 more professional, scientific and technical jobs in 2019 compared with 2014 plus a further 54,523 jobs in manufacturing; there was "marginally" higher economic growth in the north than the national average (0.1% above the UK as a whole). However, there had also been negative changes: spending had risen by more than twice as much per person in London as in the north; late trains on northern franchises have more than doubled over the lifetime of the Northern Powerhouse; 200,000 more children were living in poverty; 150,000 more people were in jobs paying less than the living wage; and while there had been £3.6 billion in public spending cuts in the north, the south east and the south west had seen a £4.7 billion rise.

Chi Onwurah, the MP for Newcastle Upon Tyne Central, noted that "without real investment, powers and accountability, [The Northern Powerhouse] can never be more than a marketing ploy with a little money attached". She said having elected Mayors (one of the achievements cited by the IPPR) did not improve democracy or create better outcomes, noting that it was not the structure of local government that mattered, but the effectiveness in changing lives.

Roger Marsh, Chair of the NP11 Group of Northern Local Enterprise Partnerships said that the Northern Powerhouse needed a coherent strategy that set out a clear vision. He argued that the strategy needed to be designed and led by the North, and must be long-term. “To be truly successful, the Northern Powerhouse must be a thread running throughout Government policy, not an idea that waxes and wanes according to political circumstances,” he said.

== See also ==
- Cities and Local Government Devolution Act 2016
- The Northern Way
- Combined authority
- Northern Hub
- Northern Powerhouse Rail
- Local enterprise partnerships
- Localism Act 2011
- Devolution in the United Kingdom
- Europe 2020
- The Great Exhibition of the North
- The Factory
