= Northern Powerhouse Rail =

Proposed railway network in the North of England

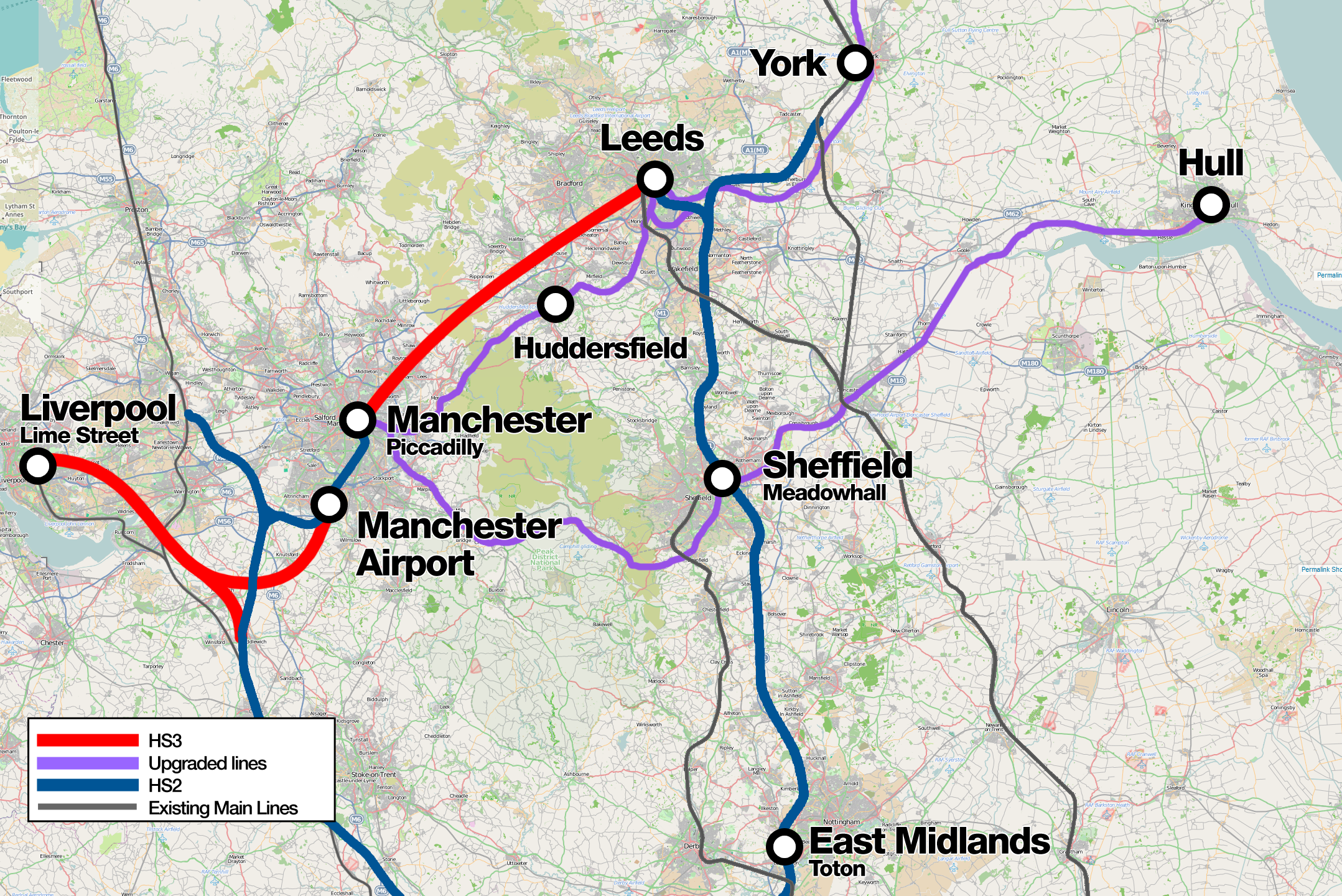
- Map, originally envisaged in 2017, showing suggested improvements in the Northern Powerhouse framework, partly labelled HS3.

Overview
- Owner: Network Rail
- Locale: Northern England
- Website: transportforthenorth.com

Service
- Type: High speed railway
- System: National Rail

Technical
- Track gauge: 1,435 mm (4 ft 8 1/2 in) standard gauge
- Electrification: 25 kV AC overhead

Northern Powerhouse Rail (NPR) is a proposed major rail programme designed to substantially enhance the economic potential of the North of England. The project aims to transform rail services between major Northern cities, improving journey times and frequencies using new and significantly upgraded railway lines in the region. The current proposals, announced in January 2026, include improving connectivity between Sheffield, Leeds, Bradford, and York; a new route between Liverpool and Manchester via Warrington and Manchester Airport; and improved trans-Pennine connections between Manchester and Bradford, Leeds, Sheffield, and York, building on the Transpennine Route Upgrade. The project has a funding cap of £45 billion.

The project has been subject to significant changes in scope since its conception in 2014. The original scheme proposed a new high-speed rail line between Liverpool and Leeds via Bradford, with a section of line shared with High Speed 2 (HS2) between Manchester Airport and Manchester Piccadilly station. However, in 2021, the scheme was significantly curtailed in the Integrated Rail Plan for the North and Midlands (IRP). The IRP proposed a shorter new line from Warrington via Manchester to Marsden, with the remaining route to Liverpool and Leeds using upgraded existing lines. The project was subject to further uncertainty during the Truss and Sunak governments, particularly after the cancellation of HS2 Phase 2 in October 2023, which adversely affected the business case for NPR. The current proposals were announced in January 2026 after a protracted internal review.

== Background ==
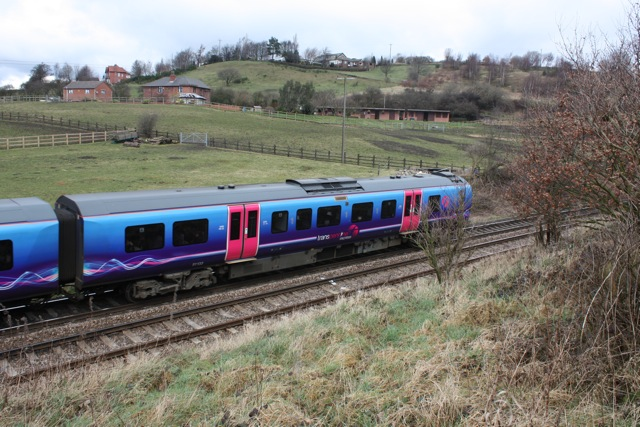
Many Manchester–Leeds trains run via the Huddersfield line.

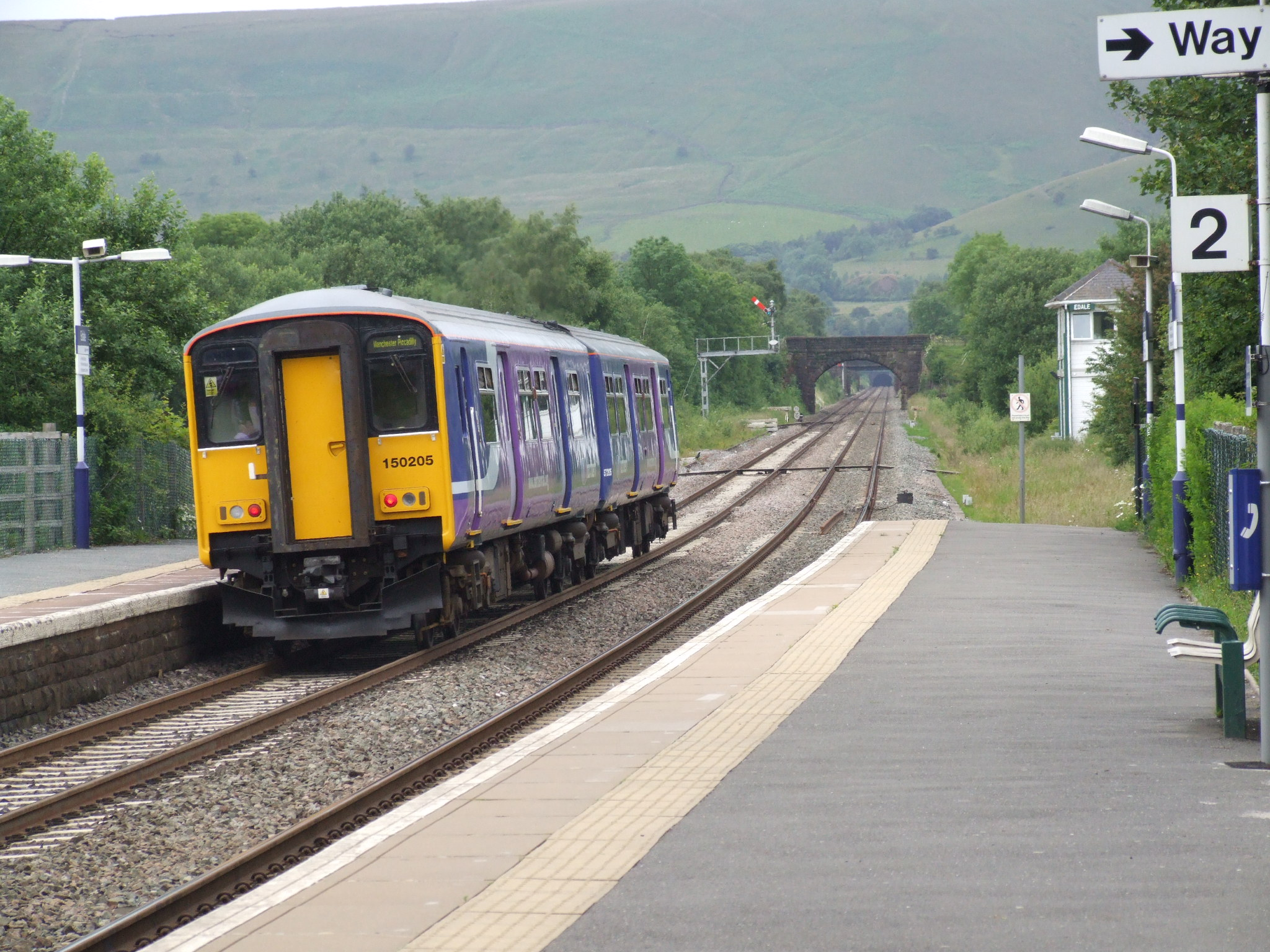
Manchester–Sheffield trains run via the Hope Valley Line.

NPR aims to improve rail service frequencies and journey times between the major cities in the North of England. Present-day rail connections between cities such as Liverpool, Manchester and Leeds are slow compared to commuter journeys across Greater London. By improving transport connections, it is proposed that commuters will be able to travel to work more freely, allowing these cities to compete together as one large single economy, rather than competing against one another. According to analysis by the devolved public transport authority Transport for the North (TfN), currently fewer than 10,000 people in the North can access four or more of the North's largest economic centres within 60 minutes. This could rise to around 1.3 million once NPR is fully delivered.

NPR has been developed alongside existing projects to improve rail journey times in northern England. Northern Hub, a scheme to improve the rail network around Manchester, was developed and partially delivered between 2009 and 2020. Schemes to upgrade the Huddersfield line by 2014 were included in Network Rail's CP5 improvements, with an aim to reduce Manchester–Leeds journey times by 15 minutes. In 2011, the first stage of electrification of the Huddersfield Line was allocated £290 million of funding. Electrification work started in 2013. The project has since been superseded by the £11 billion Transpennine Route Upgrade, which is delivering electrification, station rebuilds, digital signalling, and partial track quadrupling between Manchester, Leeds, and York. Upgrades to the Hope Valley Line between Manchester and Sheffield were completed between 2022 and 2024.

== History ==
=== 2014–2016: Announcement and early development ===
==== Northern Powerhouse ====
In June 2014, at a speech given in Manchester at the Science and Industry Museum, the Chancellor of the Exchequer, George Osborne, proposed a high speed rail link between Leeds and Manchester combining the existing route with new tunnels and infrastructure. Osborne argued that the northern cities' influence was comparatively less than London's and that the link would promote economies of agglomeration.

Osborne suggested the line should be considered as part of a review of HS2 Phase 2. Initial estimates suggested that a rail line with a 140 miles per hour (230 km/h) line speed could reduce Leeds–Manchester journey times to 30 minutes. Osborne estimated the cost to be less per mile than that of HS2, giving a cost of under £6 billion.

==== One North ====
On 5 August 2014, an alliance of six city councils–Leeds, Liverpool, Hull, Manchester, Newcastle upon Tyne and Sheffield–unveiled 'One North', a regional transport plan which proposed a new 125 miles per hour (201 km/h) trans-Pennine high speed rail line connecting Manchester and Leeds. The plan included other regional rail developments and proposed accelerating delivery of HS2 Phase 2. The estimated cost of the high speed Manchester–Leeds rail link was £5bn, with a proposed completion date of 2030; the entire project was costed at £10bn to £15bn. George Osborne attended the project launch and provided his backing for the project. A report published by High Speed Two Limited (HS2 Ltd) in October 2014 acknowledged the need for improved east–west rail links in northern England, and recommended progressing the schemes proposed in the 'One North' plan.

On 20 March 2015, the Department of Transport published plans for transport infrastructure improvements in the north of England. The report proposed a number of options for improved rail links between Liverpool, Manchester, Leeds, Sheffield, Newcastle and Hull. The proposals included new 140 miles per hour (230 km/h) lines between the major northern cities, with cost estimates from £5bn to £19bn and estimated journey times of one half to two thirds of current routes. Alternative upgrades of existing routes were costed in the £1bn to £7bn range, with lesser journey time reductions of 10–15 minutes. The proposals were in addition to HS2 Phase 2 plans for Manchester, Sheffield, and Leeds. Delivery was planned for Network Rail Control Period 6 (2019–24).

==== National Infrastructure Commission ====
In March 2016, the National Infrastructure Commission (NIC) reported on transport infrastructure projects in the north of England. It recommended bringing forward NPR proposals, beginning with the Manchester–Leeds section. It also recommended collaboration between HS2 Ltd, Manchester City Council, and the envisaged devolved transport authority Transport for the North (TfN) on the design of HS2 Phase 2, including Manchester Piccadilly station. The report suggested the development of NPR after the completion of Network Rail's £11bn Transpennine Route Upgrade, which was then scheduled to take place between 2015 and 2022.

At the 2016 Budget, Chancellor George Osborne endorsed the outline proposals by the NIC for a high speed line between only Manchester and Leeds, with an aim of reducing journey times to 30 minutes between the two destinations.

In October 2017, Chancellor Philip Hammond allocated £300 million to future-proof junctions between NPR and HS2, to allow east–west services to use HS2 infrastructure. Later in the same month, it was proposed that an underground station at Manchester Piccadilly should be built to accommodate NPR services of up to eight trains per hour.

=== 2017–2020: Strategic Outline Business Case ===
==== Transport for the North ====
In December 2017, the newly-created devolved transport authority Transport for the North (TfN) announced its proposals for NPR, which were subsequently published in TfN's draft 30-year Strategic Transport Plan of staged developments for northern England. The TfN NPR proposals included a new line between Liverpool and Leeds via Bradford, with the section between Manchester Airport and Manchester Piccadilly shared with HS2. The proposals also included upgrades to the existing Hope Valley Line between Sheffield and Manchester, and electrification and upgrades to the existing lines from Leeds to Hull (via Selby) and Sheffield to Hull (via Doncaster). A Strategic Outline Business Case for NPR was to have been completed by TfN by the end of 2018 but was delayed until 2020. This was then further delayed until the publication of the Integrated Rail Plan (IRP) in November 2021.

TfN aspirational journey times and service frequencies for NPR
Route	Journey time (hr:min)		Service frequency (trains per hour)	
Route	Before NPR	With NPR	Before NPR	With NPR
Manchester–Liverpool	0:37–0:57	0:26	4	6
Manchester–Leeds	0:46–0:58	0:25	4	6
Manchester–Sheffield	0:49–0:57	0:40	2	4
Sheffield–Hull	1:20–1:26	0:50	1	2
Sheffield–Leeds	0:39–0:42	0:28	1	4
Leeds–Hull	0:57	0:38	1	2
Leeds–Newcastle	1:28–1:35	0:58	3	4

==== Funding commitments ====
In July 2019, Prime Minister Boris Johnson pledged to fund the Leeds to Manchester section of the NPR route as a first stage of NPR. It was announced that the plans would be published in Autumn 2019, after the Oakervee Review of HS2 had concluded. In September 2019, the NPR minister Jake Berry said that a possible underground station at Manchester Piccadilly, estimated to cost £6 billion, would inflate the overall cost of the project and lead to spending cuts elsewhere on the project.

=== 2021–2025: Curtailment and uncertainty ===
==== Integrated Rail Plan ====
In 2020, TransPennine Express introduced an intercity fleet capable of at least 125 mph (up from current 100 mph) with some capable of travelling at 140 mph with minor modifications to take advantage of future upgrades (pictured: Class 802 on test at King's Cross station).

In November 2021, the project was substantially curtailed with the publication of the Integrated Rail Plan for the North and Midlands (IRP). The IRP announced the cancellation of HS2 East to Leeds, and that NPR would be slimmed down. The curtailed IRP proposal for NPR envisaged a new high-speed line between Warrington, Manchester and Marsden. The rest of the route to Liverpool and Leeds would use upgraded existing routes, from Liverpool to Warrington via Ditton and from Marsden to Leeds using the Huddersfield line. This announcement elicited unanimous anger and disappointment from Northern leaders, who characterised the IRP as a "betrayal". In July 2022, the House of Commons Transport Committee expressed concern that the evidence base for the IRP was insufficient, noting that upgraded lines would not deliver the transformative benefits required to address regional inequalities.

In October 2022, Liz Truss committed to a full new high-speed rail line from Liverpool to Hull with a stop in Bradford. However, in November 2022 the following Sunak government stated that only the 'core' sections of NPR would be funded.

==== Cancellation of HS2 Phase 2 ====
On 4 October 2023, Rishi Sunak cancelled HS2 Phase 2 at the Conservative Party Conference in Manchester. This included the section of line shared between HS2 Phase 2b and NPR from Manchester Airport to Manchester Piccadilly. The Department for Transport subsequently stated that £12bn of HS2 funds would be reallocated to deliver NPR between Liverpool and Manchester as part of Network North.

Following the cancellation of HS2 Phase 2, the Government invited regional leaders to advise on a solution to improve connectivity between Liverpool and Manchester. This led to the creation of the Liverpool–Manchester Railway Board (LMRB) in May 2024, chaired by the Mayor of the Liverpool City Region, Steve Rotheram, and the Mayor of Greater Manchester, Andy Burnham. The LMRB announced its Liverpool–Manchester Railway (LMR) proposal in May 2025. The LMR plan proposed a new high-speed line between Manchester Piccadilly and Warrington Bank Quay via Manchester Airport, using part of the alignment previously planned for HS2 Phase 2, and a combination of upgrades to existing lines and new tunnels between Warrington and Liverpool Lime Street. LMR also proposed a Liverpool Gateway station in proximity to Liverpool John Lennon Airport.

After the 2024 United Kingdom general election, multiple public statements from ministers confirmed that the new Labour Government's NPR proposals would be announced imminently. Expected timings for the announcement were delayed several times due to a protracted internal review. In October 2025, construction of HS2 north of Birmingham to the West Coast Main Line at Handsacre was delayed for a further four years, with significant implications for the phasing of future NPR proposals. In November 2025, the NPR announcement was further delayed until 2026. In response to the delay, the leaders of 11 regional and local authorities in northern England wrote to Chancellor Rachel Reeves urging her to fully fund NPR.

=== 2026: Outline announcement ===
On 14 January 2026, the Government announced an outline plan for NPR under its Northern Growth Strategy, setting out high-level proposals to be delivered in three phases, with early priorities including rail electrification between Leeds and Sheffield. £1.5 billion of funding was committed to support initial planning and development work over the Spending Review Period (2026–2030), with a total funding cap of £45 billion (in 2025 pounds) imposed for overall delivery of the project. The end date for the program was estimated at December 2051 by the July 2026 July NISTA major projects report.

== Routes ==
=== Phase 1 ===
==== Leeds–Sheffield ====
The first phase prioritises electrification and upgrades of existing lines between Sheffield and Leeds to enable up to four fast services per hour between the two cities. The Dearne Valley Line will be electrified between Sheffield and South Kirkby Junction, where the line connects with the electrified Leeds branch of the East Coast Main Line. Swinton Junction is proposed to be remodelled, with a fourth platform at Swinton station.

==== Leeds–Bradford ====
The outline proposals include potential electrification and upgrades in the Leeds - Bradford corridor, including the continued development of a new station at Bradford.

==== Leeds–York ====
The outline proposals include potential enhancements in the Leeds - York corridor. Electrification and upgrades of the line between Leeds and Church Fenton, south of York, is currently being delivered by the Transpennine Route Upgrade.

=== Phase 2 ===
==== Liverpool–Manchester ====
The second phase proposes a predominantly new line between Liverpool and Manchester via Warrington and Manchester Airport. The new line will run from a new station at Warrington Bank Quay to Manchester Airport, where it will follow the route of the cancelled HS2 Phase 2 to Manchester Piccadilly. The route and stations between Liverpool and Warrington will be subject to further development.

The NPR route aligns with the Liverpool - Manchester Railway (LMR) proposed by regional leaders in 2025. The LMR plan proposed to connect Liverpool and Warrington by upgrading the existing freight line between Ditton and Warrington Bank Quay.

=== Phase 3 ===
==== Manchester–Leeds ====
The third phase aims to improve trans-Pennine connectivity between Manchester and Leeds. Since the outline NPR announcement in January 2026, Rail Minister Lord Hendy has ruled out a new line across the Pennines. Phase 3 will instead build on the Transpennine Route Upgrade, which is delivering electrification, quad-tracking, and station rebuilds on the Huddersfield Line between Manchester and Leeds to enable additional fast and stopping services.

==== Manchester–Birmingham ====
Phase 3 will include a feasibility study on a new line connecting Birmingham and Manchester. Delivery of this new line would not take place until after the completion of NPR Phase 2 between Liverpool and Manchester, and HS2 between London and Birmingham. HS2 Phase 2 was planned to connect the two cities via Crewe and Manchester Airport until its cancellation by Rishi Sunak in October 2023.

==== Manchester–Sheffield ====
The outline proposals include provision to build on work delivered during Phase 1 in the Manchester - Sheffield corridor. The Hope Valley line between the two cities was previously upgraded between 2022 and 2024 to allow three fast trains and one stopping service per hour.

==== Manchester–Bradford ====
The outline proposals include provision to build on work delivered during Phase 1 in the Manchester - Bradford corridor.

== Stations ==
=== Phase 1 ===
==== Leeds ====
The first phase will prioritise delivery of an overall masterplan for Leeds station, in collaboration with local leaders.

==== Bradford ====
Development of a new through station at Bradford will continue under Phase 1 of NPR. A decision on whether to proceed is expected by Summer 2026, with funding available for detailed design work if approved. The site of the new station, Bradford St James, has been earmarked to be located on the current St James' Market, itself built upon the former Adolphus Street station site. The current food market, which is said to have outgrown the site, would be moved elsewhere. There has been no detail of how the railway lines would access the station. However, the railway station at Bradford Interchange would close.

==== Sheffield ====
The first phase aims to deliver station capacity enhancements at Sheffield station. Options for tram-train expansion of the South Yorkshire Supertram will also be studied and integrated.

==== Rotherham ====
A new station is planned to serve Rotherham on the Dearne Valley Line, allowing intercity services between Sheffield and Leeds to call at Rotherham. The plan for a new station at Rotherham Gateway is being developed by the South Yorkshire Mayoral Combined Authority and Rotherham Metropolitan Borough Council, with £11.35 million allocated towards planning in June 2025.

=== Phase 2 ===
==== Liverpool ====
The Phase 2 route between Warrington and Liverpool is subject to further consultation. This will include assessment of station options for Liverpool, with existing plans for improvements at Liverpool Central set to be integrated into the project. Proposals will support the Central Gateway regeneration of the city centre around Liverpool Lime Street and Liverpool Central. Possible gateway stations for the wider Liverpool City Region will also be assessed.

==== Warrington ====
Phase 2 will include a new low-level station at Warrington Bank Quay. This will allow interchange between NPR and West Coast Main Line services to London and Scotland. Development of the station will be integrated with the existing Warrington Bank Quay Gateway regeneration scheme.

==== Manchester Airport ====
A new station serving Manchester Airport is proposed on the NPR Phase 2 line between Warrington and Manchester, using the site of the cancelled HS2 Phase 2b Manchester Airport station. The NPR line will follow the planned alignment of HS2 Phase 2b between Manchester Airport and Manchester Piccadilly, enabling re-use of the HS2 Phase 2 Hybrid Bill for NPR.

==== Manchester Piccadilly ====
Phase 2 will include a new station at Manchester Piccadilly. The details of the new station are subject to further development, but options for an underground station will be assessed. Previous plans under HS2 Phase 2 envisaged an elevated terminus station for HS2 and NPR services.

== Funding ==
Planning and development of the project is supported with funding of £1.5bn over the Spending Review Period (2026 - 2030), with £410 million expected to be spent by March 2026. The government has set a funding cap of £45 billion for the overall delivery of the project into the 2040s.

=== Devolved classification ===
On 17 March 2023, the project was classified by HM Treasury as an "England and Wales" project, although no infrastructure for the project would be in Wales. As a result of the classification, Wales will not receive a Barnett consequential of funding, unlike Scotland and Northern Ireland. At the time, the UK Government said it would state the benefits in "due course" and it is "responsible for heavy rail infrastructure across England and Wales", therefore it spends the money directly for Wales rather than providing funds to the Welsh Government. Plaid Cymru described the decision as "blatant lies", that the project "harms the Welsh economy" and that rail infrastructure should be devolved to Wales. The Welsh Liberal Democrats stated it is "very clearly not [an] England and Wales" project. The Welsh Government stated it should be classed as "England-only" and the current classification was "wrong".

== Perspectives ==
In 2014, responses to George Osborne's initial NPR proposal were mixed. Commentators noted that the proposal could be viewed as an attempt to gain political support in the north of England in the run-up to the 2015 general election. The British Chambers of Commerce, Confederation of British Industry and others were cautiously positive about the proposal, but emphasised the need to deliver on existing smaller scale schemes.

=== Support ===
In August 2017, the former chancellor George Osborne called for the Government to commit to NPR following the backing of Crossrail 2 and scrapping of electrification schemes in July 2017.

=== Project name ===
NPR has often been referred to in the press as "High Speed 3" or "HS3", in reference to the development of high-speed rail in the United Kingdom. The first high speed railway line to be built in Britain was High Speed 1 (HS1), the route connecting London to the Channel Tunnel, which opened 2003–2007. A second high speed line, High Speed 2 (HS2), is currently being constructed between London and Birmingham. HS3 refers to the potential development of a third high speed rail route as part of NPR.

Historically, the use of the term High Speed 3 has been loose–the House of Lords' Economic Affairs Committee (March 2015) stated that there was no firm definition of the route implied by HS3:

Improvements to east-west links in the north of England have often been referred to as "HS3". This term has been used interchangeably to mean the connection between Leeds and Manchester or a longer route running from Liverpool to Hull via Manchester and Leeds. Such a railway would not necessarily need to be high-speed. [..] We refer to "east-west links" rather than "HS3" in this report as there is no clear indication yet what form or route the proposals might take or if the trains will be "high speed" in the same sense as HS2.

— The Economics of High Speed 2, Economic Affairs Committee (2015)

== Previous proposals ==
=== Routes ===
==== Transport for the North ====
After Prime Minister Boris Johnson pledged to fund the Manchester–Leeds section of NPR in 2019, TfN presented three options for evaluation. All three options included electrification and upgrades of existing lines to Sheffield, Newcastle, and Hull. TfN preferred Option 3. Option 1 was taken forward for appraisal in the Integrated Rail Plan.

• Option 1 was a mixture of new-build high-speed line, covering roughly half the route from Liverpool to Leeds, and upgrades to the existing lines into Leeds (via Huddersfield) and Liverpool (via Warrington Bank Quay) for the rest of the route.

• Option 2 was for an entirely new-build high-speed line between Leeds and Manchester, including a new station on the outskirts of Bradford; a new line from Warrington to Liverpool (with a parkway station at Warrington); and an underground Piccadilly station with a connection allowing it to be used for Sheffield services.

• Option 3 was the same as Option 2, but with a new central station underground at Warrington (still offering less convenient interchange to Bank Quay), and an underground station in the vicinity of the existing Bradford Interchange station.

— Integrated Rail Plan for the North and Midlands – Technical Annex, p. 15.

==== Integrated Rail Plan ====
Four potential networks were appraised during development of the IRP. Two options–Upgrades Only and Core Network–were developed as the IRP progressed. The Core Network option was preferred and included in the IRP announcement.

- Upgrades Only proposed upgrades to the Cheshire Lines Committee line between Liverpool and Manchester via Warrington, alongside the ongoing Transpennine Route Upgrade.
- Core Network included a new high speed line from Warrington to Marsden via Manchester Airport and Manchester Piccadilly, with upgrades to the existing line between Leeds and Bradford alongside the ongoing Transpennine Route Upgrade.
- Wider Network was based on the 2019 TfN Option 1 proposal, and included the Core Network alongside a new or upgraded connection between Huddersfield and Bradford. Electrification of the Hope Valley line and lines from Leeds and Sheffield to Hull was also included.
- TfN Preferred Network included a new high speed line between Liverpool and Leeds via new stations at Warrington, Manchester Airport, Manchester Piccadilly and Bradford, alongside upgrades of surrounding existing lines.

==== HS2 Phase 2 ====
HS2 Phase 2b was designed to accommodate future NPR services between Manchester Airport and Manchester Piccadilly. At the time of its cancellation in 2023, the HS2 route included passive provision for a grade-separated junction with the NPR route to Liverpool at Millington, west of Manchester Airport. Work to future-proof the junction was backed by £300 million in funding by Chancellor Philip Hammond in 2017.

==== Liverpool–Manchester Railway ====
In 2025, the metro mayors of Liverpool and Manchester, Steve Rotherham and Andy Burnham, proposed a new Liverpool–Manchester Railway project independent of the cancelled HS2 Phase 2.

=== Stations ===
==== Liverpool ====
In March 2019, it was announced a new commission had been established to plan a new £6bn city centre station in Liverpool to accommodate HS2 and NPR services.

The Liverpool–Manchester Railway proposed development at Liverpool Lime Street station to accommodate new services. New tunnels were proposed to allow the LMR route to access the station. LMR also proposed a new Liverpool Gateway station in the south-east of the city, close to Liverpool John Lennon Airport and major employment centres.

==== Manchester Piccadilly ====
During the development of HS2 Phase 2b in Manchester, HS2 Ltd carried out an options assessment for an underground through station that would cater to both HS2 and NPR services. This study compared the existing plan for an elevated terminus station with three possible underground through stations: deep (B) and shallow (B1) variants of an underground station aligned with the current platforms, and one running perpendicular under the current platforms (D). These options were estimated to cost £12.3bn, £11.4bn, and £12.1bn respectively, against an estimated £7bn for the elevated station. The report concluded that the surface station was the preferred option.

At the time of its cancellation in 2023, plans for HS2 Phase 2b in Manchester included a six-platform terminus station elevated on a viaduct adjacent to the current Manchester Piccadilly station. Passive provision for east-facing chords to a future NPR route were included on the station approach, close to the north portal of the HS2 tunnel to Manchester Airport. This arrangement would have required east-west NPR services to reverse at Manchester Piccadilly.

The Liverpool–Manchester Railway plan envisaged a new underground station at Manchester Piccadilly.

=== Alternative proposals ===
==== National Infrastructure Commission ====
A 2016 report into NPR alternatives by Arup, commissioned by the National Infrastructure Commission, studied potential enhancement of the Manchester–Leeds route, focusing on the Diggle route (via Huddersfield) utilising disused track with new-build tunnels, and identified potential journey time savings of between 1 and 10 minutes. An additional preliminary study by Network Rail did not rule out that a Leeds–Manchester journey time of 30 minutes could be achieved on the Calder Valley line.

== Timeline of key events ==
- June 2014 – "Northern Powerhouse" vision announced, including improved east–west rail links via "High Speed 3" (HS3).
- February 2016–2018 – Transport for the North develops strategic outline business cases for Northern Powerhouse Rail (NPR).
- July 2019 – Prime Minister Boris Johnson announces support for a new Manchester–Leeds high-speed route as part of NPR.
- 2020 – Work continues on NPR development options, but dependent on HS2 Phase 2 alignment decisions.
- November 2021 – Integrated Rail Plan scales back earlier NPR proposals (partial new line + upgrades instead of full new high-speed network). This was repeatedly referred to as a "Betrayal" by northern leaders and media outlets.
- October 2023 – HS2 Phase 2 (Birmingham–Manchester) cancelled by Rishi Sunak at the Conservative Party Conference In Manchester. Government says NPR will still be delivered, but with revised scope. £12bn was committed under "Network North" to connect Liverpool and Manchester.
- May 2024 – Liverpool–Manchester Railway Board (L&MR) established by northern leaders to progress alternatives/new options in parallel to central government NPR process.
- July 2024 – The Labour Party wins the UK general election.
- 2024–2025 – Multiple public statements from ministers confirm NPR proposals “will be set out soon,” with timings adjusted several times.
- September 2025 – Expected NPR announcement delayed again pending internal review.
- October 2025 – HS2 connection deferrals announced, impacting NPR sequencing and timelines.
- November 2025 – ITV reports NPR announcement pushed back to 2026. The leaders of 11 regional and local authorities in northern England write to the chancellor urging her to fully fund NPR.
- January 2026 – Government announced NPR outline plan, setting out high-level proposals to be delivered in phased packages, with early priorities including rail electrification around Leeds. £1.5bn of funding will support initial planning and development work.

== See also ==
- Calder Valley line
- High-speed rail in the United Kingdom
- Huddersfield Line
- Northern Hub
- Northern Powerhouse
- Transpennine Route Upgrade
- UK Ultraspeed
- Woodhead line
