= Northern Hub =

UK rail upgrade programme between 2009 and 2020

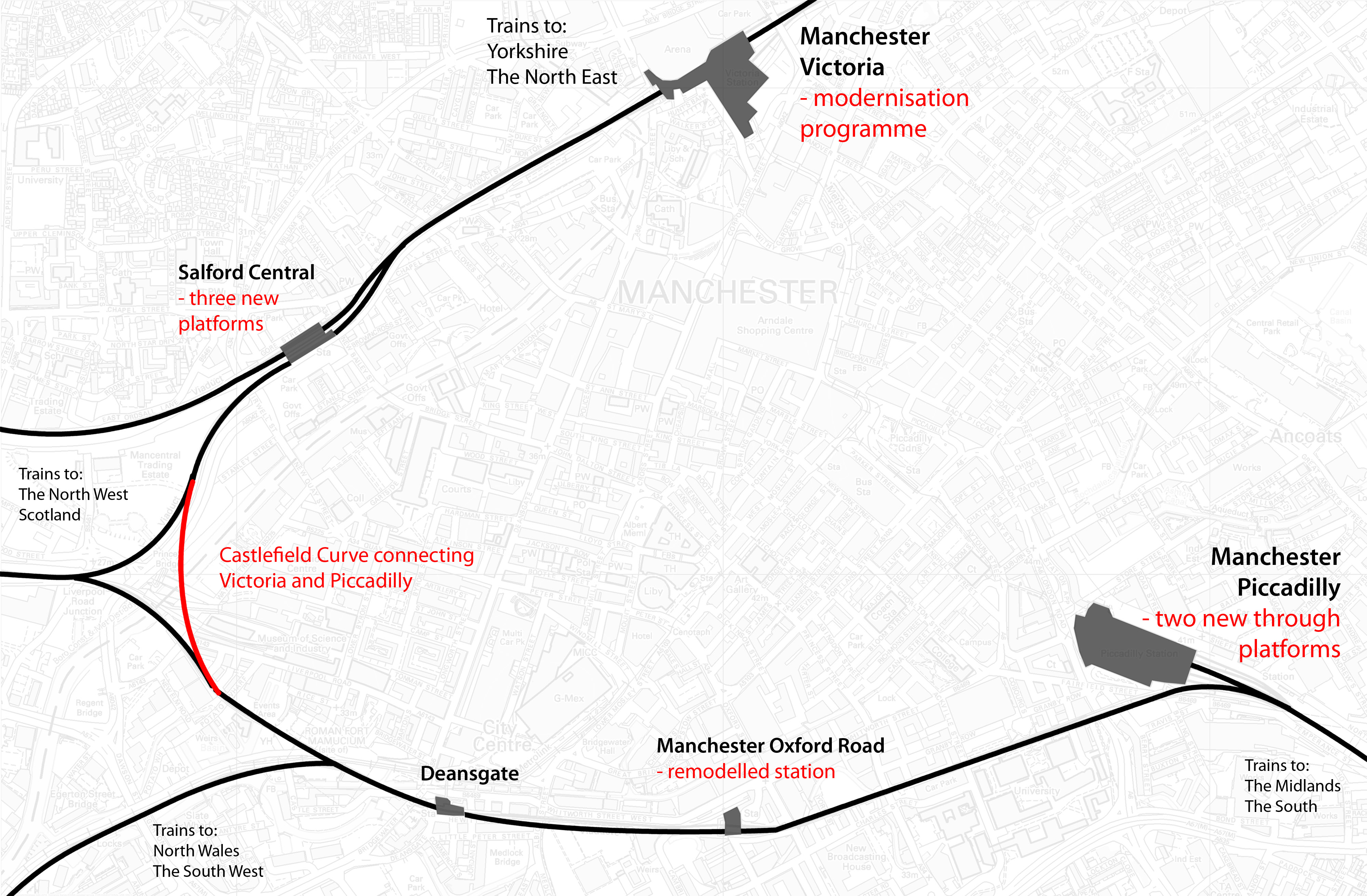
Schematic map showing rail improvements around Manchester city centre for the Northern Hub project

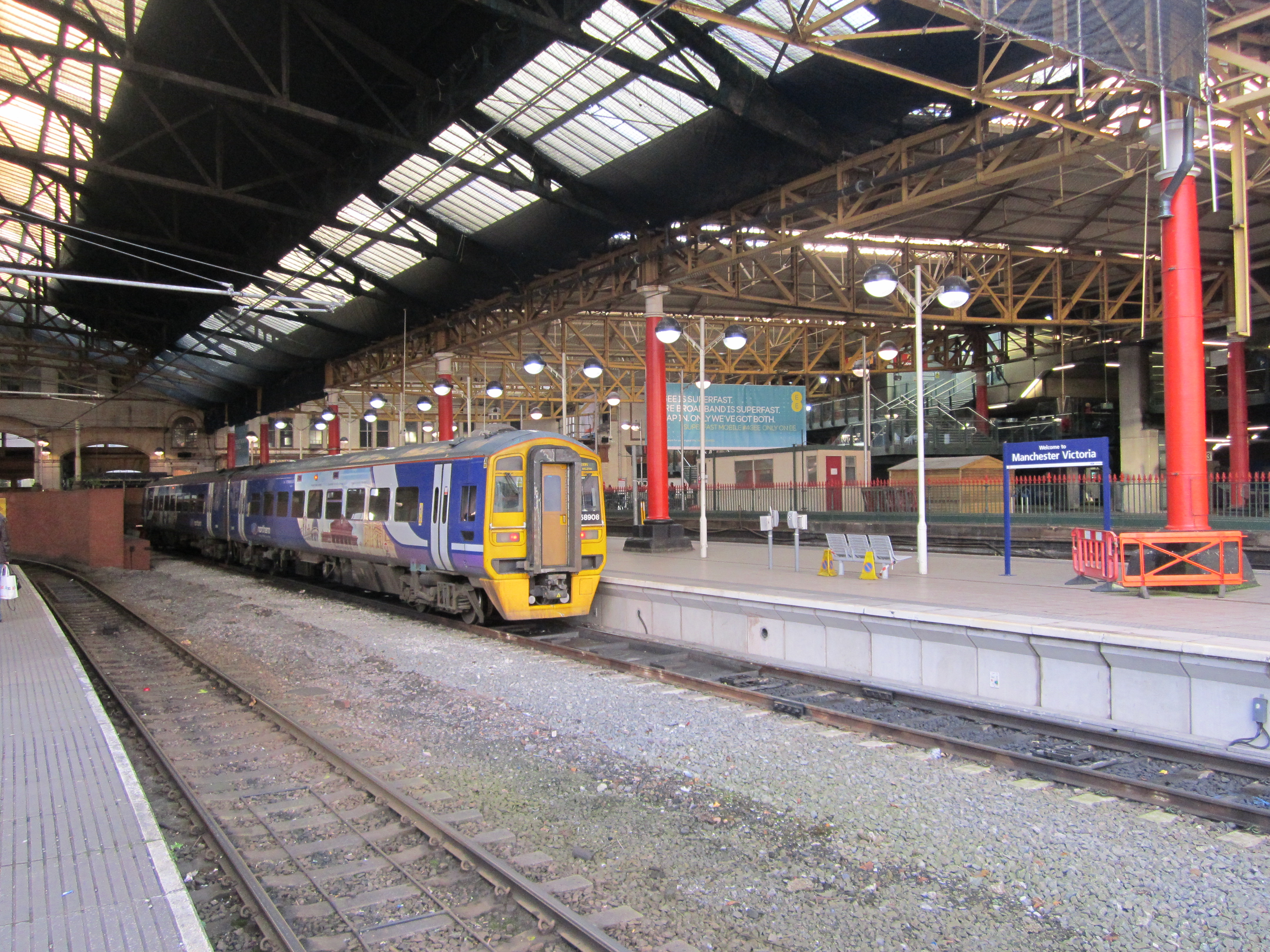
Terminating platforms at Manchester Victoria in 2012, before modernisation

The Northern Hub was a rail upgrade programme between 2009 and 2020 in Northern England to improve and increase train services and reduce journey times between its major cities and towns, by electrifying lines and removing a major rail bottleneck in Manchester. It was predicted to stimulate economic growth in the region. The project had several elements but the prime objective was to eradicate the bottleneck in Manchester and allow trains to travel through the city at speed without stopping. The project was announced as the Manchester Hub in 2009. The project's steering partnership involved Network Rail, Deutsche Bahn, First TransPennine Express, Northern Rail, East Midlands Trains, CrossCountry, Freightliner, the Department for Transport, Transport for Greater Manchester and Merseytravel.

Services from Liverpool to Leeds and beyond were diverted from the Liverpool to Manchester line southern route, via Warrington Central and Manchester Piccadilly, to the more direct electrified Liverpool to Manchester northern route, via Newton-le-Willows and Manchester Victoria; this provides a fast route to and through Manchester. The original proposals included an additional two through platforms at Manchester Piccadilly station which would have allowed a further four trains per hour through the Castlefield corridor, however this was officially cancelled in May 2023.

The refurbishment of Manchester Victoria station was completed in October 2015, this allowed it to become an east–west rail interchange and through station between Liverpool and Leeds. Trains from North-East England to Manchester Airport were planned to use the £85 million Ordsall Chord, between Manchester Victoria and Manchester Oxford Road, to access Piccadilly and would have continued to the airport without reversing at Piccadilly.

The Manchester Hub Study, outlining the project, was released by Network Rail in February 2010. Costs were estimated at £530 million, subsequently reassessed to £560 million. Chancellor George Osborne approved expenditure of £85 million for the Ordsall Chord in his budget on 23 March 2011 and other aspects of the scheme were reviewed to ensure best value. A further £130 million was committed in Osborne's budget of March 2012 and approval for the full scheme was confirmed by the government on 16 July 2012. The first train ran on the chord on 10 December 2017 and the project was completed by 2018.

Support for the scheme was vociferous from civic and business leaders, due to the high benefit-to-cost ratio, and from politicians, such as George Osborne; but was also criticised for being incremental and only improving the rail network in Northern England to "where it should have been a decade ago". The scheme had a benefit-to-cost ratio (BCR) of £4 for every £1 invested - double that of Crossrail in London and the proposed High Speed 2 project which in October 2013 had BCRs of £2.10 and £2.30, respectively.

The Northern Hub project was completed in 2020 after the modernisation of Manchester Victoria station, completion of the Ordsall Chord, platform expansion at Manchester Airport and introduction of 138 new purpose-built trains for Northern and TransPennine Express. It has been superseded by the Great North Rail Project. Further projects included High Speed 3 which proposed an upgraded trans-Pennine railway line. A feasibility study of the west to east rail line and its branches into HS2 will be published in March 2016.

== Background ==
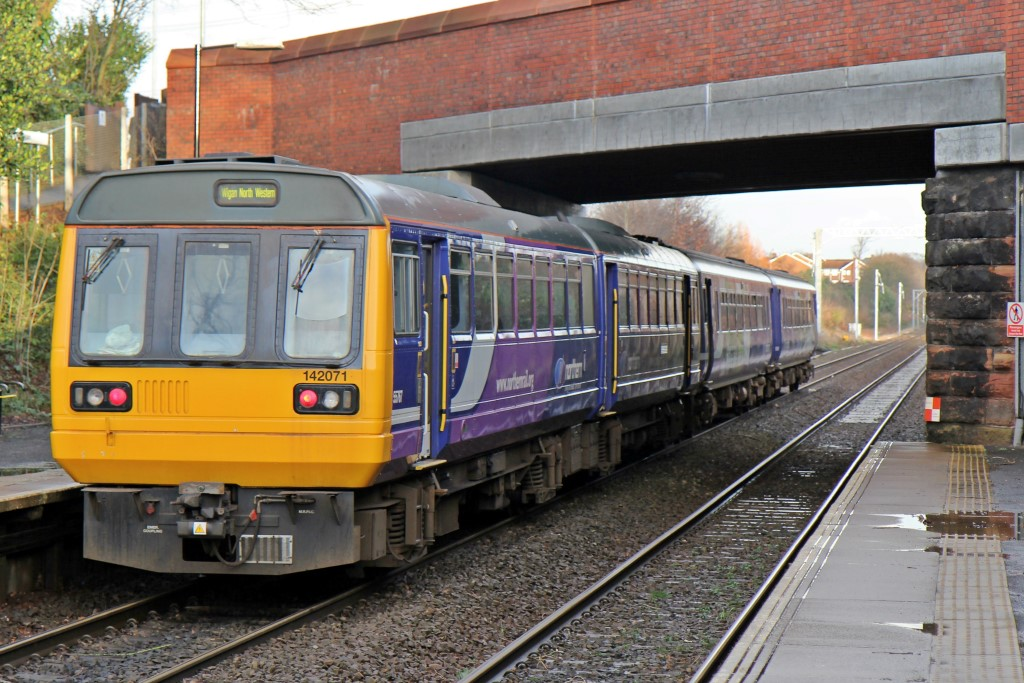
Approximately 90% of Arriva Rail North's rolling stock was built in the 1980s, including the unpopular "Pacers" (pictured). As of 2017, the last investment in new-built rolling stock for Northern was in 1998.

The Northern Hub was proposed in February 2010 to resolve problems around Manchester city centre that restricted route capacity and caused delays.

- Terminating trains in through platforms at Victoria station removed capacity for through trains. The problem could have been mitigated by an additional terminating platform west of the station but operational efficiencies were achieved by altering route paths to relieve congestion.
- Congestion at Piccadilly was caused by trains having to reverse to travel to Manchester Airport and trains between Liverpool and Yorkshire or the East Midlands had to switch lines across the throat of the station blocking all other services.
- Freight trains pass through Manchester city centre, unusual for a city centre rail network. Two freight trains per hour pass through Manchester to Trafford Park and no alternative route exists. Freight trains using passenger routes through Manchester was raised in Parliament in 2002.

Network Rail concluded that no single intervention would unlock the bottlenecks but that greater efficiency and enhancement to services was possible. A proposal to use Piccadilly primarily for north–south services and Victoria for east–west services was agreed as the most effective course of action.

The re-alignment of services commenced in May 2014 when First TransPennine Express services between Liverpool and Newcastle were routed through Manchester Victoria rather than Piccadilly. It is expected most TransPennine Express services will pass through Victoria after the May 2018 timetable change after the opening of the Ordsall Chord in December 2017.

== Station improvements ==
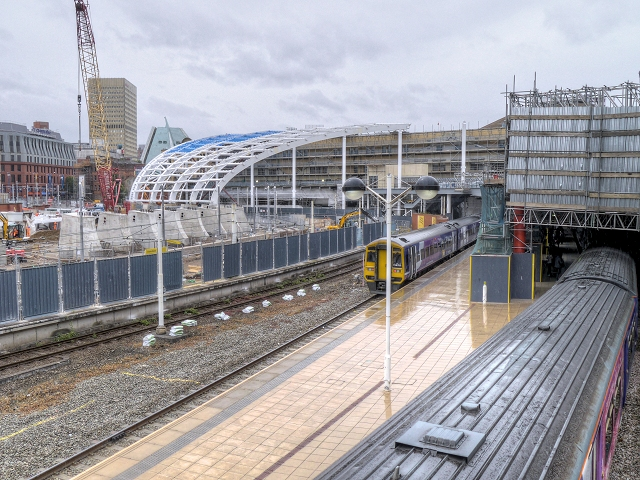
The partially complete new roof at Manchester Victoria in July 2014

Major stations will be improved to include new platforms, station layout re-configuration and redevelopment. Most improvements will be in Manchester aimed at alleviating bottlenecks that delay passing services and restricts routes.

=== Manchester ===
==== Delivered ====
Victoria station will be re-configured as the Northern England hub for east–west rail services. Once voted the worst station in the United Kingdom, it has received a £44 million transformation including a £20 million roof covering the concourse and four platforms.

At Manchester Airport station a new platform was built creating extra capacity and access for direct services from other cities in Northern England. Construction of the fourth platform began in February 2014 and it opened in Autumn 2015.

==== Cancelled ====
Piccadilly's through platforms, 13 and 14, were to have been modernised and two through platforms (15 and 16) built over Fairfield Street to alleviate congestion.

Oxford Road's platforms were to have been lengthened and a footbridge built. The Grade II listed timber grid-shell roof would have been incorporated into the new station design. The surrounding site could be redeveloped with office, residential and leisure space.

These elements of the scheme were cancelled in May 2023.

=== Salford ===
Salford Crescent station will be redeveloped at a cost of £12 million and further development could occur should extra capacity be required.

=== Leeds ===
At Leeds Station two platforms will be built at a cost of £13.6 million to alleviate congestion.

=== Elsewhere ===
Huyton and Roby stations will have two new tracks through the stations to allow faster trains to pass and provide two additional platforms. Burnley Manchester Road station will receive a £2.3 million upgrade before the reinstatement of a direct rail service to Victoria via the re-opened Todmorden Curve in 2015. Dore and Totley railway station will get a second platform and a footbridge for access. The single track will be doubled.

== Infrastructure ==
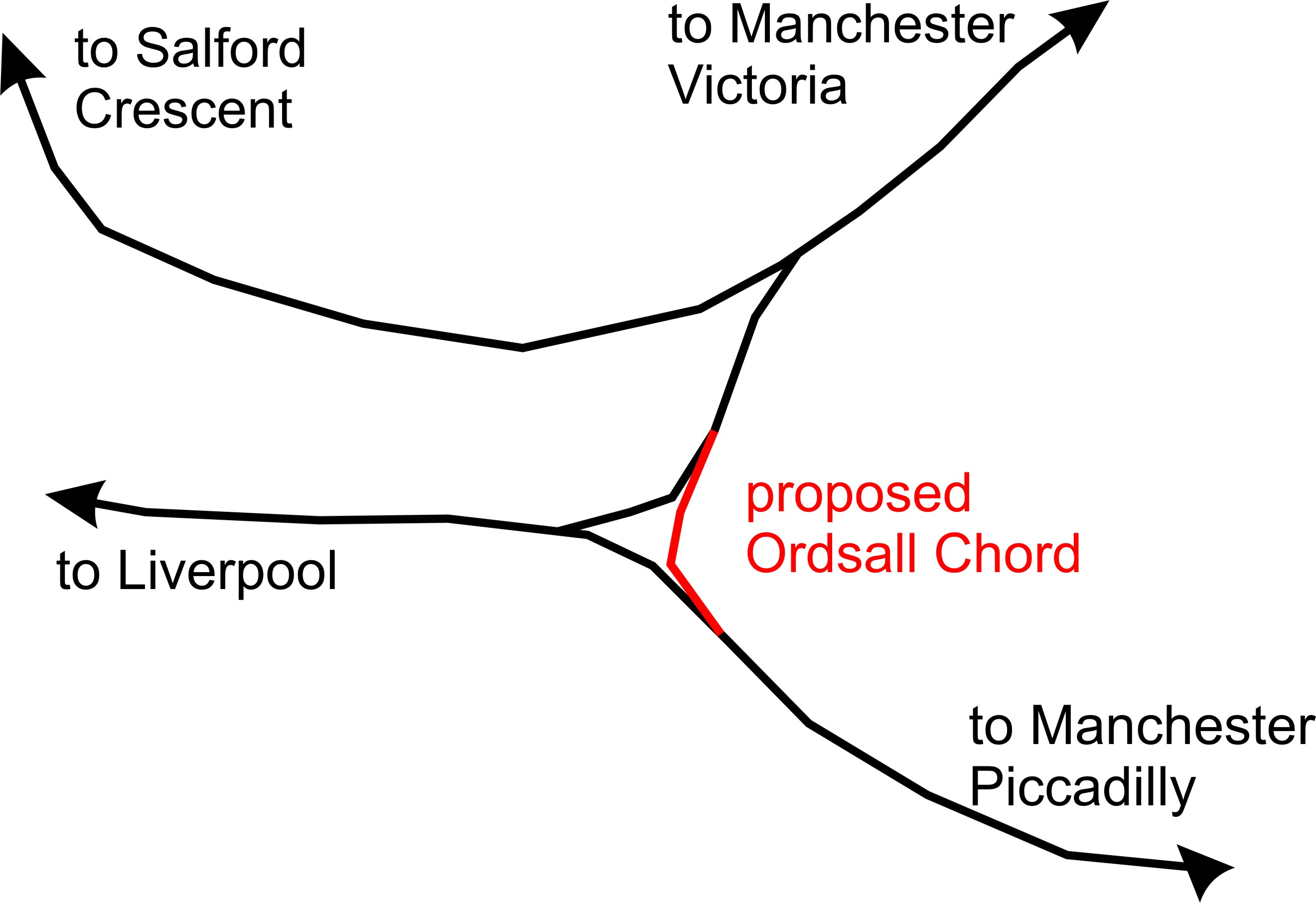
A diagram showing the Ordsall Chord.

Northern Hub plans include:

- Piccadilly and Victoria stations linked by the Ordsall Chord
- Station improvements completed at Victoria which was rated as the worst station in the United Kingdom in 2009.
- New platforms at Piccadilly for trains from/to Oxford Road, enabling traffic from the north and west to access the south side.
- Passing loop between Roby and Huyton on the line from Liverpool to Manchester via Newton-le-Willows,
- Extra capacity on routes through the Pennines between Leeds, Huddersfield, Dewsbury and Manchester
- Passing loops at Chinley, Grindleford and Dore between Sheffield and Manchester

=== Electrification ===
Electrification for rail lines out of Manchester is underway or has been approved. While independent of the Northern Hub scheme, they complement it.

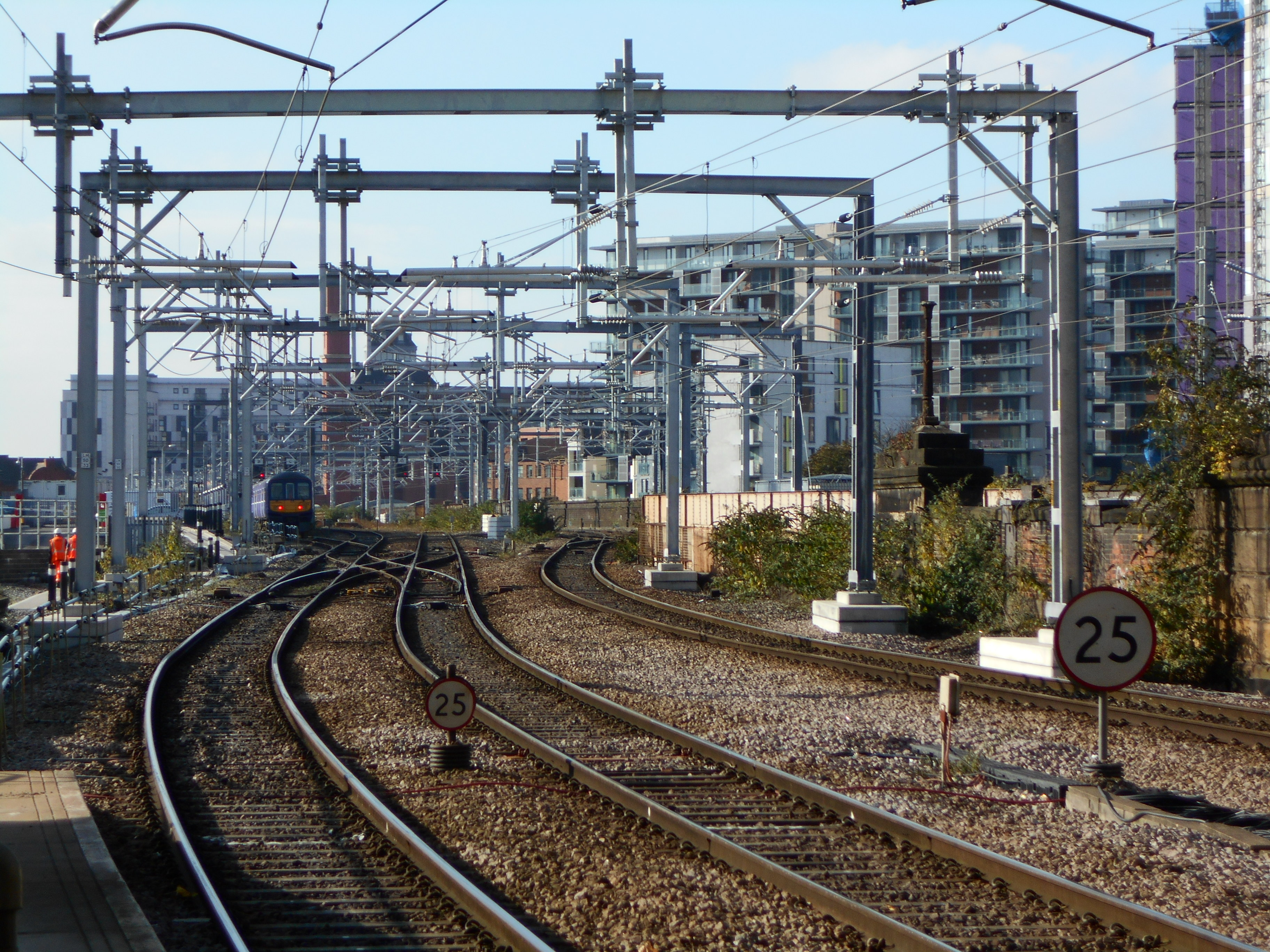
Newly installed overhead electrification into Manchester Victoria station, in October 2015

- Electrification of the Manchester to Liverpool line was announced by the Department for Transport in July 2009. The section from Manchester to Newton-le-Willows was completed in December 2013 and the section to Liverpool should have been completed by December 2014. The 32-mile line between Liverpool Lime Street and Manchester Victoria via Huyton and Newton Le-Willows has a maximum speed limit of 75 mph. Following electrification and the introduction of Class 319 stock, trains will reach 90 mph cutting journey times from 47 to 32 minutes. The Manchester to Newton-le-Willows section was completed on 17 July 2013, it was marked by a ceremony at Eccles station at which the Secretary of State for Transport, Rt. Hon. Patrick McLoughlin MP, was present. Electrified Manchester to Edinburgh and Glasgow services have been running since the timetable change in December 2013. Due to delays the target date for completion of the section from Earlestown to Liverpool was missed but electric train services between Liverpool and Manchester Airport commenced in March 2015.
- The Liverpool to Wigan Line is electrified providing a second connection to the West Coast Main Line at Ince Moss Junction via St. Helens Central. The newly electrified line was operational by May 2015.
- Electrification of the Manchester to Preston Line via Bolton was announced in December 2009 and was expected to be completed by December 2017. Preparatory work on bridges and tunnels commenced in 2014. However, the work was delayed by geological problems and change of main contractor, electric service eventually commencing on 11 February 2019.
- Electrification of the line from Preston to Blackpool North was scheduled for completion by May 2016. It joins the Manchester to Preston Line providing an electrified route from Blackpool to Manchester and the West Coast Main Line. This stage ran behind schedule (following a change of engineering contractor and the decision to combine track & signalling alterations with the electrification work) and the first electric train ran in May 2018. The scheme also involves major restructuring of the lines and rationalization at both Kirkham & Wesham station and Blackpool North. The branch to Blackpool South is not being electrified but is having new signaling at the same time and there was a total blockade of the line November 2017 - March 2018.
- The Huddersfield Line from Manchester Victoria to Leeds and York via Stalybridge was expected to be electrified between 2016 and 2018. Electrification was announced in November 2011, but the plan was paused by the government in 2015 because electrification on its own did not deliver the benefits that various stakeholders wanted. The work was expected to be completed in 2022, after the DfT gave the go-ahead for work to resume in September 2015. The section between Manchester Victoria and Stalybridge was to be completed much sooner as it was considered part of the other Northern schemes. In particular there is a grid feeder in the Stalybridge area at Heyrod supplying power to part of the schemes. It was visited by Jonathan Reynolds, the local MP for the constituency on 27 May 2016. There was a blockade from 8 July until 30 July 2017 when work was done in the Ashton under Lyne area. After some back and forth the most recent updates have shown that electrification will go all the way to Stalybridge and then onwards to Leeds. This section is now officially part of the Transpennine Route Upgrade project.

== Service improvements ==
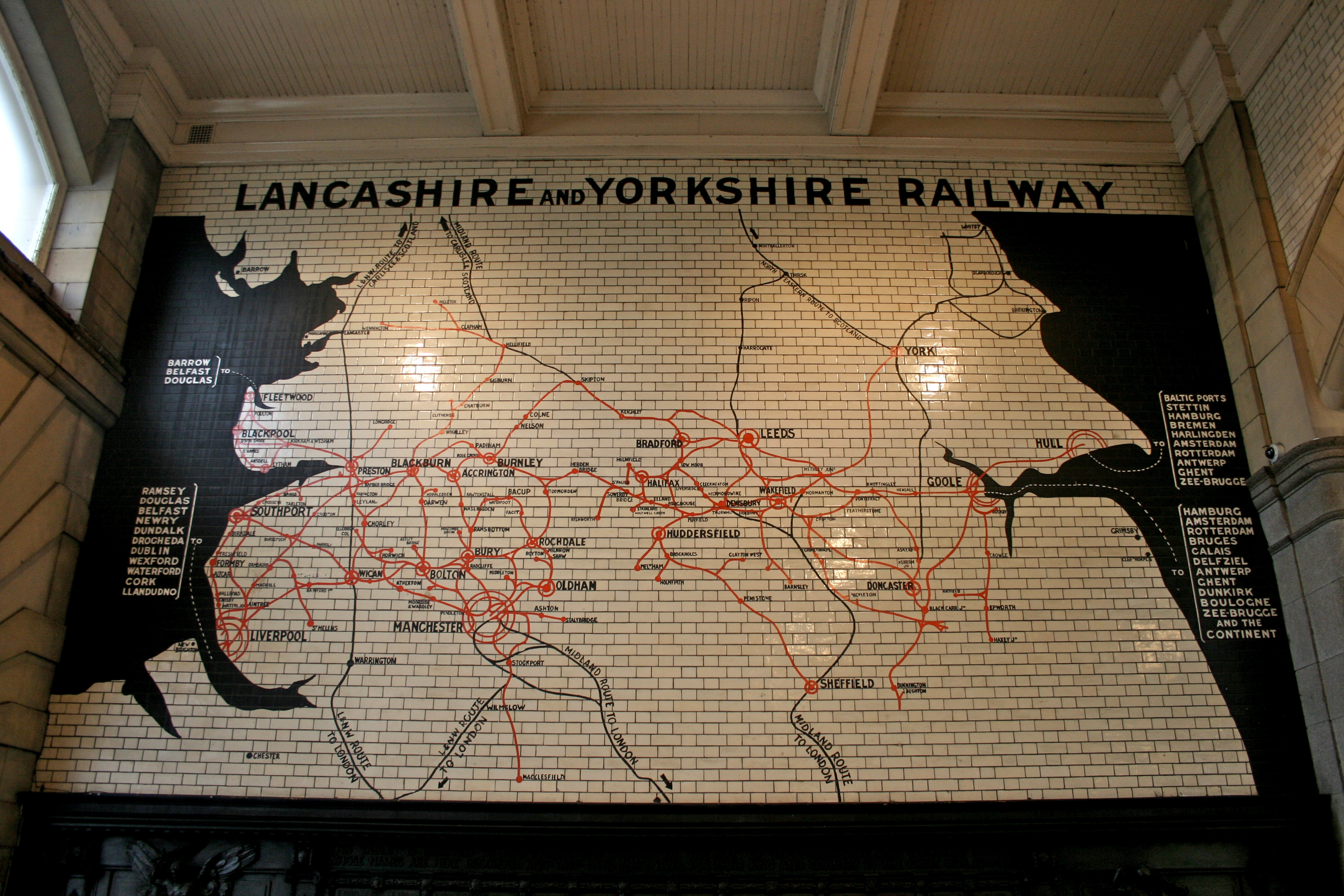
A 1900 tiled mural of the rail network of the Lancashire and Yorkshire Railway Company at Manchester Victoria.

Northern Hub is expected to deliver the following improvements:

- 14 trains an hour through Manchester compared with 10 currently
- Up to 700 more trains per day with space for 44 million more people to travel by train each year
- Two new fast trains per hour between Manchester Victoria and Liverpool Lime Street
- Six fast trains an hour at peak times between Leeds and Manchester as opposed to five
- New services to Manchester Airport from Bradford via Halifax, and the Calder Valley and from Chester
- A 15-minute service to Manchester Airport from Victoria, Oxford Road and Piccadilly
- An express service between Liverpool Lime Street and Newcastle via Manchester Victoria and Leeds commenced in May 2014

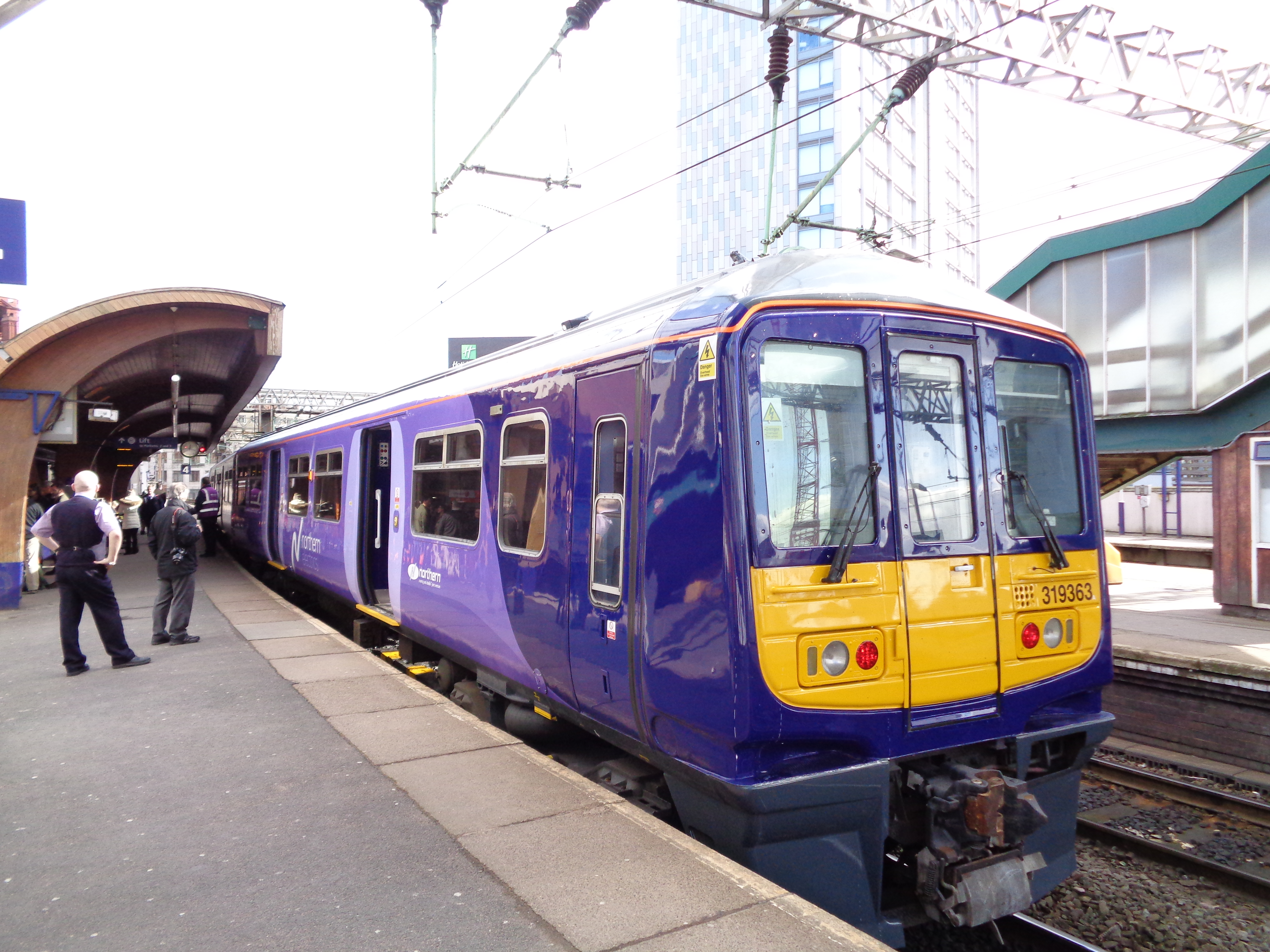
319363 at Manchester Oxford Road. The Class 319 provide faster journey times and greater capacity compared to Pacer trains. The refurbished Class 319 entered service in May 2015 between Liverpool and Manchester.

As part of the Northern Hub scheme; electrification of key lines will enable faster electric trains increasing capacity and lowering journey times. Typically, diesel trains that operated between Manchester and Liverpool such as the Class 142 and Class 156 had a maximum speed limit of 75 miles per hour (121 km/h). Following electrification, Class 319 trains reach a top speed of 100 miles per hour (160 km/h) with greater acceleration from stations.

Network Rail has published target times from Manchester to be achieved after the completion of the Northern Hub projects.

- Leeds and Manchester target time: 40 minutes - a reduction of 14 minutes
- Bradford and Manchester target time: 50 minutes - a reduction of 10 minutes
- Manchester and Sheffield target time: 40 minutes - a reduction of 8 minutes
- Chester and Manchester target time: 40 minutes - a reduction of 23 minutes
- Liverpool and Manchester target time: 30 minutes - a reduction of 17 minutes. A reduced journey time of 37 minutes was achieved in May 2014 with the introduction of the new 'express' route and the introduction of Class 319 trains in May 2015 reduced journey times between both cities to 30 minutes.
- Manchester and Preston target time: 30 minutes - a reduction of 9 minutes
- There will be faster journey times to the East Midlands via Sheffield, Chester, Halifax, Hull, Newcastle and the North East

== Timeline ==
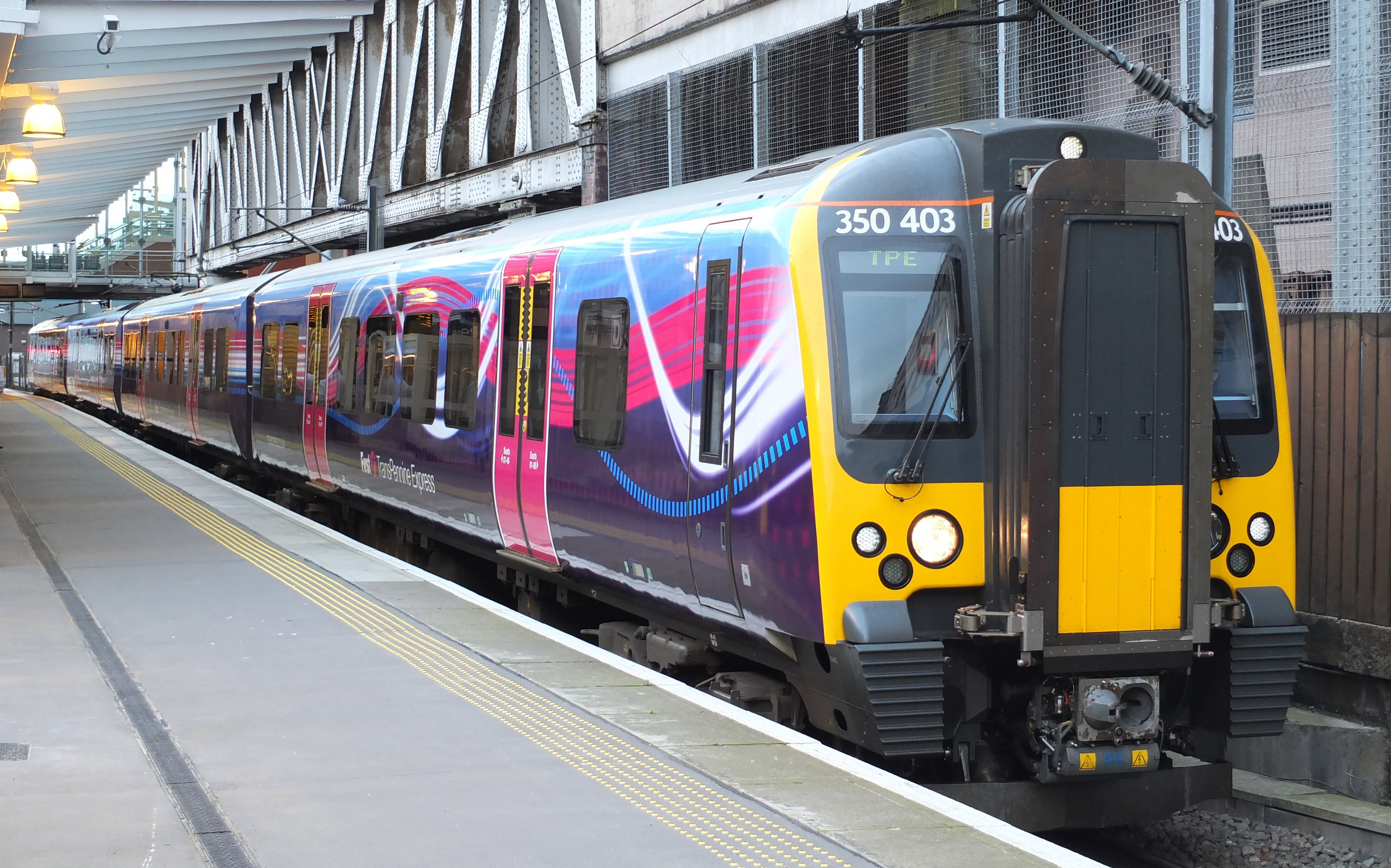
Ten new Class 350 were introduced to coincide with Newton-le-Willows to Manchester electrification in 2013. The trains operate on the Edinburgh to Manchester route.

Network Rail's original aim was for all schemes - including electrification, station upgrades and track work - to be completed by the end of 2018, though this timescale will not be met for the Transpennine electrification.

2013

- April - work begins on restoring Manchester Victoria station
- 30 December - Manchester to West Coast Main Line and Newton-le-Willows electrification complete. New four-carriage Class 350s are introduced, reducing journey times and increasing capacity on the Edinburgh-Manchester Airport route.

2014

- 20 May - a new fast service between Liverpool and Newcastle via Manchester Victoria begins delivering journey time reductions
- December - Newton-le-Willows to Liverpool Lime Street and Huyton to Wigan electrification complete - delayed, first services Liverpool to Manchester Airport did not run until March 2015. Four-carriage Class 319s will be introduced increasing capacity between Liverpool and Manchester Airport via Manchester Piccadilly.

2015

- August - Completion of Manchester Victoria station redevelopment

2016

- Early 2016 - work begins on building two new platforms at Manchester Piccadilly and re-configuring Manchester Oxford Road (subject to application approval, expected in late 2015)

2017

- December
  - Ordsall Chord operational
  - Manchester Victoria to Preston electrification complete
  - Manchester to Miles Platting area electrification complete (TP phase 1)

2018

- Preston-Blackpool electrification complete
- Platforms 15 and 16 were supposed to be operational at Manchester Piccadilly

2020

2022

- Manchester to Leeds and York electrification scheduled for completion

2023

- Proposed Network Rail (Manchester Piccadilly and Oxford Road Capacity Scheme) Order formally withdrawn; Piccadilly, Oxford Road, and Castlefield Corridor enhancements cancelled

== Heritage threat ==
The historic first passenger railway station, Manchester Liverpool Road, a Grade I listed building, is threatened by the plan. After this project is completed, it will no longer be possible to run trains into or out of the station. The Manchester Museum of Science and Industry management objected to the scheme and an inquiry was set up in 2014 to investigate potential damage to the historic structure.

== Future ==
The Northern Hub may be merged into or superseded by a larger project being called High Speed 3. David Higgins, chairman of the HS2, stated in March 2014 that the Northern Hub scheme is incremental and the benefits of the High Speed 2 will not be fully felt if rail links between Northern cities are not improved. In June 2014, George Osborne, Chancellor of the Exchequer stated his vision to see improved transport links between Liverpool, Manchester, Sheffield and Leeds to increase economic productivity. Osborne's proposals were referred to as 'Crossrail of the North' and 'High Speed 3'. In November 2015 Transport for the North (TfN) proposed a four-track trans-Pennine railway line that would link with the HS2 line to London, and a new Liverpool-Manchester airport-Manchester railway line also linked to HS2. A feasibility study of the west to east rail line and its branches into HS2 will be published in March 2016.

== See also ==
- Northern Powerhouse
- Northern Powerhouse Rail
- Transpennine Route Upgrade
