= Railway electrification in Great Britain =

Electrification of railway lines

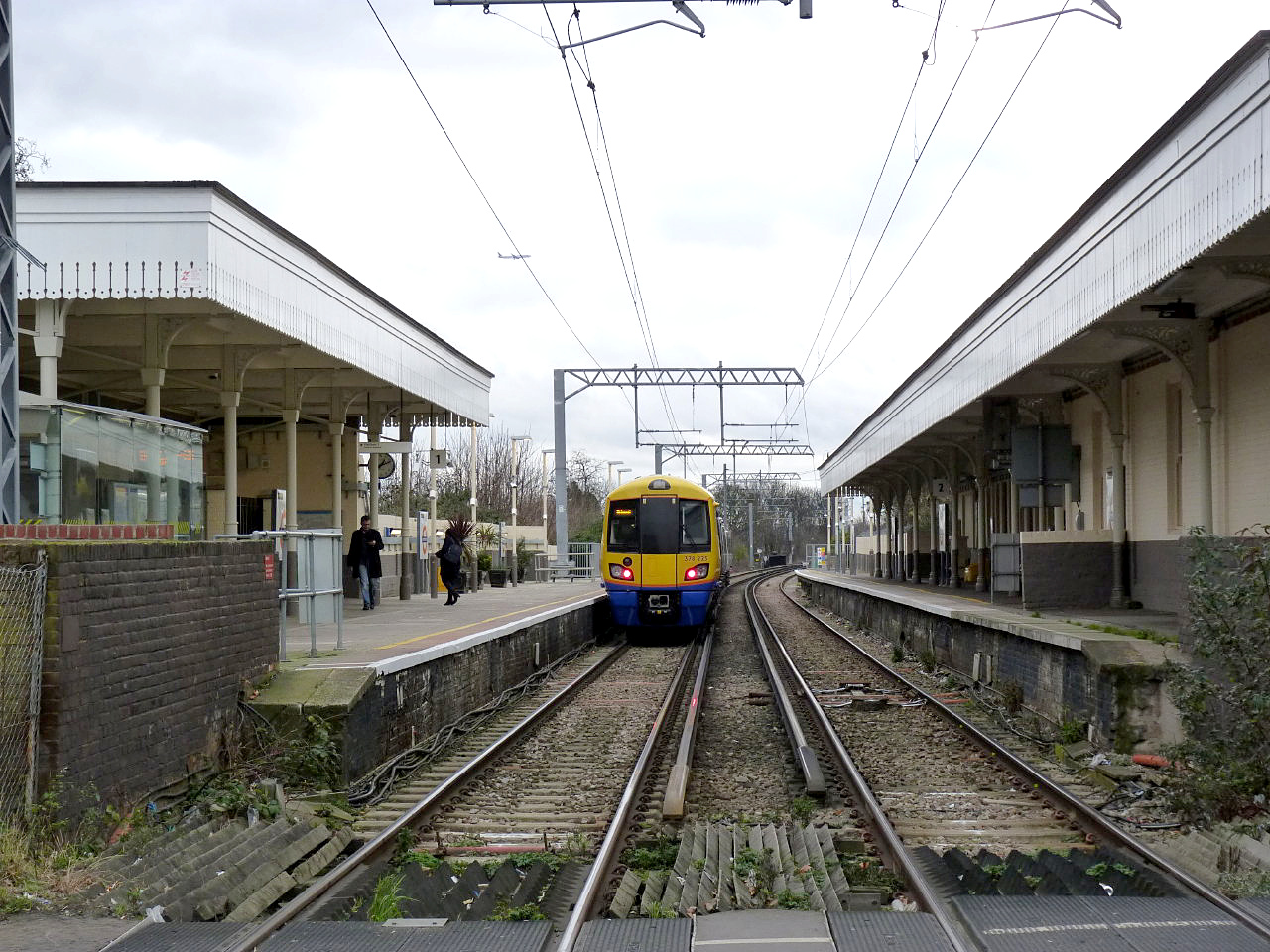
Acton Central station is a changeover point from 750 V DC third rail to 25 kV AC overhead electrification, on the North London Line.

Railway electrification in Great Britain began in the late 19th century. A range of voltages has been used, employing both overhead lines and conductor rails. The two most common systems are 25 kV AC using overhead lines, and the 750 V DC third rail system used in Southeast England and on Merseyrail. As of October 2023, 6,065 kilometres (3,769 mi) (38%) of the British rail network was electrified.

According to Network Rail, as at 2003, 64% of the electrified network used the 25 kV AC overhead system, and 36% used the 660/750 V DC third-rail system.

== History ==
=== Early electrification ===
The first electric railway in Great Britain was Volk's Electric Railway in Brighton, a pleasure railway, which opened in 1883, still functioning to this day. The London Underground began operating electric services using a fourth rail system in 1890 on the City and South London Railway, now part of the London Underground Northern line. The Liverpool Overhead Railway followed in 1893, being designed from the outset to be electric traction, unlike the City and South London Railway which was designed to be cable hauled initially.

Main line electrification of some suburban lines began in the early years of the 20th century, using a variety of different systems. The Mersey Railway converted to 600 V DC electric multiple-unit operation on 3 May 1903, thus eliminating the problems caused by steam traction in the long tunnel under the River Mersey, and the Lancashire & Yorkshire Railway's Liverpool Exchange to Southport (and on to Crossens) suburban commuter line was similarly electrified at 625 V by March 1904. Both of these lines initially used a fourth rail system.

Other early projects followed German practice at the time and installed AC OLE systems at a lower frequency (in this case 25 Hz) than mains electricity (50–60 Hz). This was initially pioneered by the Midland Railway on the short line between Lancaster, Morecambe and Heysham in 1908 using AC OLE at 6.6 kV 25 Hz. This was quickly followed in 1909 by a more extensive scheme in South London using similar technical standards on the suburban line between London Bridge and Victoria. Further extensions of 6.6 kV OLE in South London were swiftly pursued throughout the 1910s and 1920s. However, the system was fully removed in 1929 and replaced with 660 V DC third rail following the grouping of these lines into the wider Southern Railway that preferred the conductor rail system implemented by the former London and Southwestern Railway.

Wishing to avoid a repeat of the Gauge War, the Ministry of Transport commissioned inquiries into implementing a standard system for future rail electrification schemes other than London Underground lines. An advisory committee in 1921 recommended 1,500 V DC for both overhead and third rail systems. This was reviewed by a committee chaired by Sir John Pringle in 1927 which revised the recommendation to 1,500 V DC overhead and 750 V DC third rail systems, which was formalised in legislation in 1932.

=== Post-war and Nationalisation ===
After World War II and the nationalisation of the railways in 1948, British Railways (BR) expanded electrification at both 1,500 V DC overhead and 660/750 V third rail. In 1951, a British Transport Commission review of electrification generally endorsed the findings of the Pringle Committee, but additionally recommended further investigation into advances in 50 Hz AC electrification. The following year, the Lancaster, Morecambe and Heysham 6.6 kV 25 Hz AC line was experimentally converted to 50 Hz. The success of this experiment, combined with the successful 25 kV electrification at Aix-les-Bains, led BR in 1956 to adopt 25 kV 50 Hz AC overhead as standard for all projects outside logical extensions of third-rail systems under the Modernisation Plan, and the 1932 regulations were revoked. The Plan authorised the electrification of the West Coast Main Line as far as Manchester and Liverpool along with diversionary routes through Stoke and around Birmingham. This was a significant step in the history of British electrification – not only for implementing new technological standards, but also in scale and scope of the work. This delivered close to 200 route miles (320 km) of continuous electrified railway serving long distance and higher speed passenger services as well as significant freight traffic and several suburban lines. Up to this point the longest electrified route was 87 miles (140 km) between London and Portsmouth via Arundel on the third rail DC system and most electrification had been specifically for commuter and suburban traffic. Although the West Coast Main Line was the main headline for electrification under the 1955 plan, it also sanctioned other AC suburban schemes in Glasgow and North East London/South Essex that were delivered in the early 1960s as well as significant expansions of the third rail system throughout Kent and from west of Woking to Bournemouth removing steam traction.

The natural extension of the West Coast Main Line's electrification beyond Crewe through to Glasgow was authorised later in 1970 with wires meeting the Glasgow suburban network at Motherwell by 1974. However, electrification of other mainline routes languished for several decades. As well as the harsh political and economic environment for major railway investment, significant long distance electrification projects were effectively stalled by the unprecedented success of the Class 43 HST "Intercity 125" fleets that became the principle traction for intercity services on the East Coast Main Line, Great Western Main Line, Midland Main Line and Cross Country Route. This was because HST sets could deliver the same journey time benefits of electric traction without the investment of overhead line equipment. Implementation of HST trains did still require track rationalisation, line speed improvement works and re-signalling all of which had previously occurred alongside electrification schemes. Because of this, electrification projects after the completion of the West Coast Main Line were typically smaller in scope principally for suburban traffic such as London Kings Cross to Royston in 1976 and London St Pancras to Bedford in 1983.

In the mid-1980s fortunes turned in favour of electrification mostly due to the advent of sectorisation that split British Railways into business units based on the type of train service operated rather than purely geographic territories. The most major schemes authorised under the InterCity sector were electrification of the East Coast Main Line route between London and Edinburgh along with its branch to Leeds and the line between Edinburgh and Carstairs — providing an electric route between Edinburgh and Glasgow. This was despite the success of HST rolling stock in use on that route and intended to introduce 140 mph (225 km/h) capability with the new Class 91 "Intercity 225" fleet. 140 mph operation was later descoped however. The project was given the go-ahead in 1984 and had delivered all work by 1991 to budget and ahead of schedule. Other notable projects in this era included large extensions of electrified lines in East Anglia with the Anglia East and Anglia West projects which, by 1987, had extended wires from Colchester to Norwich/Harwich and from Bishops Stortford to Cambridge respectively. The line north of Cambridge was further extended to King's Lynn 1992. Finally, the last major extension of the 750 V DC third rail system was delivered in 1988 between Bournemouth and Weymouth.

Both the Network SouthEast and InterCity sectors were better able to justify extensions of electrification especially over minor branches and connecting lines since they were able to manage fleet allocations directly. This allowed for mid-life rolling stock to be strategically cascaded onto newly electrified lines significantly improving the business cases of those infrastructure upgrades since the trains to run electric services were essentially 'free'. This was the case especially in Network SouthEast schemes like North London Line extension to North Woolwich (1985), Crouch Valley Line (1986), Romford to Upminster (1986), Tonbridge to Hastings (1986) and the East Grinstead Line (1986), Abbey Line (1988) and St Denys/Eastleigh to Portsmouth (1990), but also on some InterCity operations like full electrification of the Great Eastern Mainline which used rolling stock previously employed on the West Coast Mainline. The only other passenger sector (Regional Railways) carried out two significant electrification projects on the Ayrshire Coast Line (1987) in Scotland and Birmingham's Cross-City line (1993).The sectors involved in freight operations were also able to further electrification goals mostly concerning the electrification of several container terminals as well as connecting lines in the London area, such as the Canonbury curve and adding 25kV onto the North London Line.

Although the schemes of this era of electrification were generally delivered on time and within cost predictions, the tight budgeting requirements often meant the electrical supply was constrained requiring follow-up projects in the late 1990s and early 2000s to add necessary resilience to the traction power system exacerbated by the continual uptick in rail travel since the 2000s. Furthermore, the overhead line system type used on these projects was designed to minimise the procurement of steel by using mostly head-span structures which have proven prone to failure in adverse weather.

=== Electrification following Privatisation ===
Progress on electrification languished again after the successful delivery of the East Coast scheme pending the imminent privatisation of British Rail under the Railways Act 1993. The new privatised structure decentralised the operation of infrastructure, services, rolling stock and rolling stock procurement amongst different organisations. This meant that the financial case for new electrification was harder to make since no single organisation could benefit from the whole-system efficiencies of electric traction. This led to a large procurement of diesel rolling stock in this era. most notably the Turbostar and Voyager/Super Voyager fleets. The only notable electrification in this era were works started by British Rail and finished under Railtrack were of some suburban routes out of Leeds on the Airedale and Wharfdale lines in 1995, and the route from London Paddington to Heathrow Airport for the Heathrow Express service in 1998. Both these schemes were almost entirely developed by Regional Railways and Network SouthEast respectively. For the lines around Leeds this was in collaboration with the West Yorkshire Passenger Transport Executive, while the Heathrow Express scheme was largely funded by the British Airports Authority.

Railtrack did, however, begin a major upgrade scheme to the West Coast Main Line that involved implementing the 2x 25 kV Autotransformer (AT) system to a UK railway for the first time, initially installed and tested on the Northampton Loop. The power supply upgrade intended to implement the AT system across all major branches of the West Coast Main Line but this was progressively delayed and descoped and remains unfinished even by the mid-2020s.

Railtrack was involved in the delivery of the Channel Tunnel Rail Link (CTRL; also known as HS1) — establishing the first new mainline in the country in over 80 years — but progressively withdrew funding and operational capability as the organisation faced its own financial difficulties and public controversy in the early 2000s. This meant that the line was developed totally by the private sector consortium London and Continental Railways who contracted construction and engineering to another consortium Rail Link Engineering initially for the southern section but then the whole line as Railtrack backed out. The southern and northern sections of CTRL were delivered in 2003 and 2007 after the renationalisation of Railtrack into a new body (Network Rail) in 2002 who have maintained and operated the infrastructure ever since. The CTRL is also fitted with the 2x 25 kV Autotransformer system as is common on high-speed lines internationally.

The only electrification started (though not finished) under Railtrack auspices were of a WCML diversionary route between Crewe and Kidsgrove in 2003 (associated with the wider WCML Route Modernisation) and the branch to Larkhall in Glasgow (2005). These projects totalled 11.5 route miles.

=== Twenty-first century ===
The 25 kV AC network had expanded slowly throughout the 20th century but large areas of the country outside London remain unelectrified. In 2007, the government's preferred option was to use diesel trains running on biodiesel, its White Paper Delivering a Sustainable Railway, ruling out large-scale railway electrification for the following five years.

In May 2009, Network Rail launched a consultation on large-scale electrification, potentially to include the Great Western Main Line and Midland Main Line and smaller "in-fill" schemes. Key benefits cited were that electric trains are faster, more reliable and cause less track wear than diesel trains. On 5 June 2009, Lord Adonis was appointed Secretary of State for Transport, and announced the plans to electrify the Great Western Main Line from London as far as Swansea, as well as infill electrification schemes in the North West of England.

The most significant project in this era was electrification of the Great Western Main Line. It was first announced by the Labour government in July 2009 in the run-up to the 2010 General Election to show political commitment to a region lacking in transport investment. As a result, the proposal was made by government to Network Rail and put together with great haste as politicians had already promised the project publicly and announced a completion date of around 2018 before any planning or initial developments had been put together. The original scope was for electrification between the boundary with the then Crossrail project (Maidenhead) to Bristol via Bath, Swindon to Swansea, Bristol Parkway to Bristol Temple Meads, Didcot to Oxford and Reading to Newbury. Government intentions for the project remained even after the change of government.

This set the project off on a difficult trajectory as the promised timescale and budget was not known to be feasible and attempts to maintain that original schedule proved to balloon costs later on. It was found early on that Network Rail would require a new overhead line design as none of the available British Rail designs were compliant with EU regulations for a railway at or above 200km/h. Developing and testing the new design was more time consuming than anticipated due to a lack of specialised workforce, an issue which affected many other aspects of the project. In an attempt to keep to politically promised timescales, the project attempted to move ahead while OLE system design was still on-going causing further time-consuming and expensive inefficiencies. Other issues included difficulties locating buried signalling cables, under-estimation of conditions within Severn Valley Tunnel and unexpected geological details.

Meanwhile in July 2012 the UK government announced £4.2 billion of new electrification schemes, all at 25 kV AC and reconfirmed schemes previously announced by Adonis. These were to be Northern Hub, Midland Main Line, Electric Spine, Crossrail, Gospel Oak to Barking line and West Midlands suburban lines including the Chase Line. Many of these had ambitious scopes and timelines but would later be cut back and cancelled.

As it became clear the Great Western Mainline upgrade project would be unable to deliver to original time or cost predictions, ministers lost confidence in the project and began cancelling sections of it in order to minimise costs as much as was possible. This also led to last-minute re-specifications of the rolling stock order as no express EMUs would be able to run. In general, the project suffered from over-ambitious scheduling led by political goals and a lack of specialised workforce and wider industry experience in delivering electrification. This led to insufficient and improper planning, under-estimations of how long it would take to deliberate on technical decisions or carry out work on the ground, as well as highly inefficient practices owing to managers attempting to keep to the strict 2018 deadline. The 2014 cost prediction for the project was £1.6bn but a sizeably smaller scope was delivered in 2018 at £2.8bn giving single-track kilometre figure of £3.5m.

Following a change in government, Network Rail's capital expenditure was frozen in May 2015 pending a full financial review. On 25 June 2015, the government announced that some of the electrification projects would be delayed or cut back because of rising costs. Electrification work was to be "paused" on the Trans-Pennine route between York and Manchester and on the Midland Mainline between Bedford, Sheffield and Nottingham. Electrification of the Great Western main line would go ahead but the status of the Reading–Newbury and Didcot–Oxford sections was unclear. In 2016 large parts of the project were cut including the branches to Henley, Windsor and Bourne End, the section from Chippenham to Bristol Temple Meads, Bristol Temple Meads to Bristol Parkway and Didcot to Oxford. In 2017 the section west of Cardiff to Swansea was also formally cancelled.

Also as a result of the financial review in 2015, Midland Mainline electrification work was "paused" but then in September of that year "un-paused" now with a delayed completion date. However, funding was only given to deliver electrification between Bedford and Corby and the upgrade of overhead line equipment south of Bedford to support 125mph electric trains. By 2016, DfT announced the sections north of Kettering were to be indefinitely deferred and on 20 July 2017, Chris Grayling the Secretary of State for Transport cancelled Midland Mainline electrification north of Kettering and also the electrification of East-West Rail and the Electric Spine proposal in its entirety. The decision was made citing disruptive works, overrunning costs and use of bi-mode technology as an alternative.

In 2017, Network Rail had awarded contracts for the electrification of Bedford to Corby and work began. But the scope was soon re-worked in 2019 when Parliamentary Under-Secretary of State for Transport Andrew Jones authorised an extension of the scheme to Market Harborough to allow for the planned connection with National Grid at Braybrook to go ahead allowing for sufficient electrical capacity for future intercity bi-mode trains. In 2021, overhead lines had reached Corby while the extension to Market Harborough was itself further extended to South Wigston as the government's Integrated Rail Plan had again re-promised Midland Mainline electrification in lieu of the proposed eastern leg of HS2 which said report had significantly truncated. By 2025, Midland Mainline electrification was again "paused" by the now Labour government with seemingly no intentions of continuing despite the most recent portion of the project (Kettering to South Wigston) being successfully delivered in March 2025 to time and under budget. Many also criticised the move as now the East Midlands region would receive no rail investment with both HS2 and electrification works ruled out.

Electrification has not been without controversy with cancellations and various appearances of the Secretary of State for Transport called before the Transport Select Committee. The Transport Select Committee published its report into various matters including regional investment disparity on the railways and calling again for the reinstatement of various cancelled electrification schemes.

A written question was submitted and answered in parliament regarding route miles electrified in the years 1997–2019.

In March 2019, the Railway Industry Association published a paper on Electrification cost challenge suggesting ways forward and a rolling program of electrification.

In terms of technical considerations, schemes in the 2010s used new overhead line designs that addressed many of the reliability weaknesses of older types and prioritised 2x 25kV Autotransformer feeding and high capacity power supplies to allow for significant future growth.

As well as a large number of new electrification projects, Network Rail also undertook a significant upgrade of the traction power supplies and distribution system of the East Coast Mainline from 2014 onwards in order to support significant traffic growth. This project pioneered the use of power electronics based traction power systems in the UK which have been heralded is a more deliverable alternative to the autotransformer based system.

In general, this era saw large and over-ambitious promises from the Coalition Government in the early 2010s seemingly led by political goals and followed by rapid deferrals and outright cancellations after 2015 following the issues faced on Great Western Mainline. But beyond the Great Western project, the rapid 'stop-start' nature of government indecision around how much electrification it intended to deliver also contributed to rising costs as this approach causes continual damage to the supply chain and the ability to train specialised staff. Despite that project's inflated costs, the rail industry was able to learn significant lessons from the Great Western project enabling other electrification projects that were taking place in the 2010s to have been delivered much more successfully. These included Liverpool to Manchester via Chat Moss (2015), Preston to Blackpool North (2018), Gospel Oak to Barking (2018), Manchester to Preston via Bolton (2019), Walsall to Rugeley (2019), Bedford to Corby (2021) and parts of the Transpennine Route Upgrade that have come online throughout the 2020s. Despite this good progress, decision makers have mostly discarded the electrification projects paused in the mid 2010s. Where some work has been allowed to take place on the Midland Mainline, politicians acted with exceptional indecisiveness before finally asserting to have abandoned electrification as an infrastructure investment not only on that route but across the network in general with the sole exception of the Transpennine Route Upgrade.

Key to ministers' reasoning in foreclosing any electrification has been the promise of battery technology or occasionally hydrogen fuel sources to allow for the replacement of diesel trains in the next few decades. This is despite the fact that these technologies are unproven in the scale they are being proposed, offer less whole-life benefits than conventional electrification and will involve multiple unknown costs on account of being a totally novel approach. Despite seeming to favour a decarbonisation method involving heavy use of battery trains, the government is yet to produce any kind of strategy to manage how this would take place.

==== Scotland ====
In Scotland, where transport is devolved to the Scottish Government since 2005, Transport Scotland has been expanding their electrified network on a rolling programme since the early 2010s starting with the re-opening and electrification of the Airdrie–Bathgate rail link. This larger plan has seen many major routes in central Scotland electrified, including the main Edinburgh Waverley–Glasgow Queen Street route. They have pursued electrification with multiple schemes in the Central Belt. All these have been 25 kV AC, as in England and Wales. Electrification throughout Scotland has been significantly more successful than in England owing predominantly to the fact that Transport Scotland committed to following a rolling programme with constant work underway enabling project teams to accumulate skills and experience, and for the supply chain to adequately scale itself confident in knowledge that future schemes will go ahead and at the scope already declared. Furthermore, Transport Scotland endeavoured to collaborate with Network Rail in the development of the rolling programme and throughout delivery to resolve problems where projects have encountered issues. As a result, the single track kilometre costs for 25kV AC in Scotland stands at no more than £1.5m sometimes as low as £1.2m. This is as opposed to costs in England where a target cost of £2.5m has been set with many projects over that figure.

== Future of third rail ==
In June 2011 Peter Dearman of Network Rail suggested that the third-rail network will need to be converted into overhead lines. He stated: "Although the top speed is 100 mph (160 km/h), the trains cannot go over 80 mph (130 km/h) well and 25% of power is lost from heat." Agreeing that conversion would be expensive, he said that the third rail network is at the limit of its power capability, especially as trains become more advanced in technology. The July 2012 Department for Transport High Level Output Specification for Network Rail Control Period 5 includes the conversion of the South West Main Line between Southampton Central and Basingstoke from 750 V DC third rail to 25 kV AC overhead as part of a scheme to improve rail freight capacity from Southampton Port. This conversion would be a pilot scheme to develop a business case for full conversion of the third-rail network. The Office of Rail and Road (ORR) has also stated that, on safety grounds, third-rail 750 V DC has a limited future.

== Existing systems – overhead line (OHL) ==
=== National Rail: 25 kV, 50 Hz AC overhead ===
British Railways chose this as the national standard for future electrification projects outside of the third rail area in 1956. Following this, a number of lines that were originally electrified at a different voltage were converted, and a number of lines have been newly electrified with this system. Work started in the late 1950s. The first major electrification project using 25 kV was the West Coast Main Line (1959–1974). Initially this was Crewe, Manchester and Liverpool south into London and Birmingham. Weaver Junction north to Glasgow followed later. The 25 kV network has been gradually expanded ever since:

==== Existing ====
Great Western Main Line:

- Electrified from London Paddington via Reading, Swindon and Bristol Parkway to Cardiff Central.
- Electrified from Reading to Newbury.
- Electrified from London Paddington to Heathrow Terminal 4 in 1994 in a joint venture between British Rail and the British Airports Authority using the Mark 3B series.

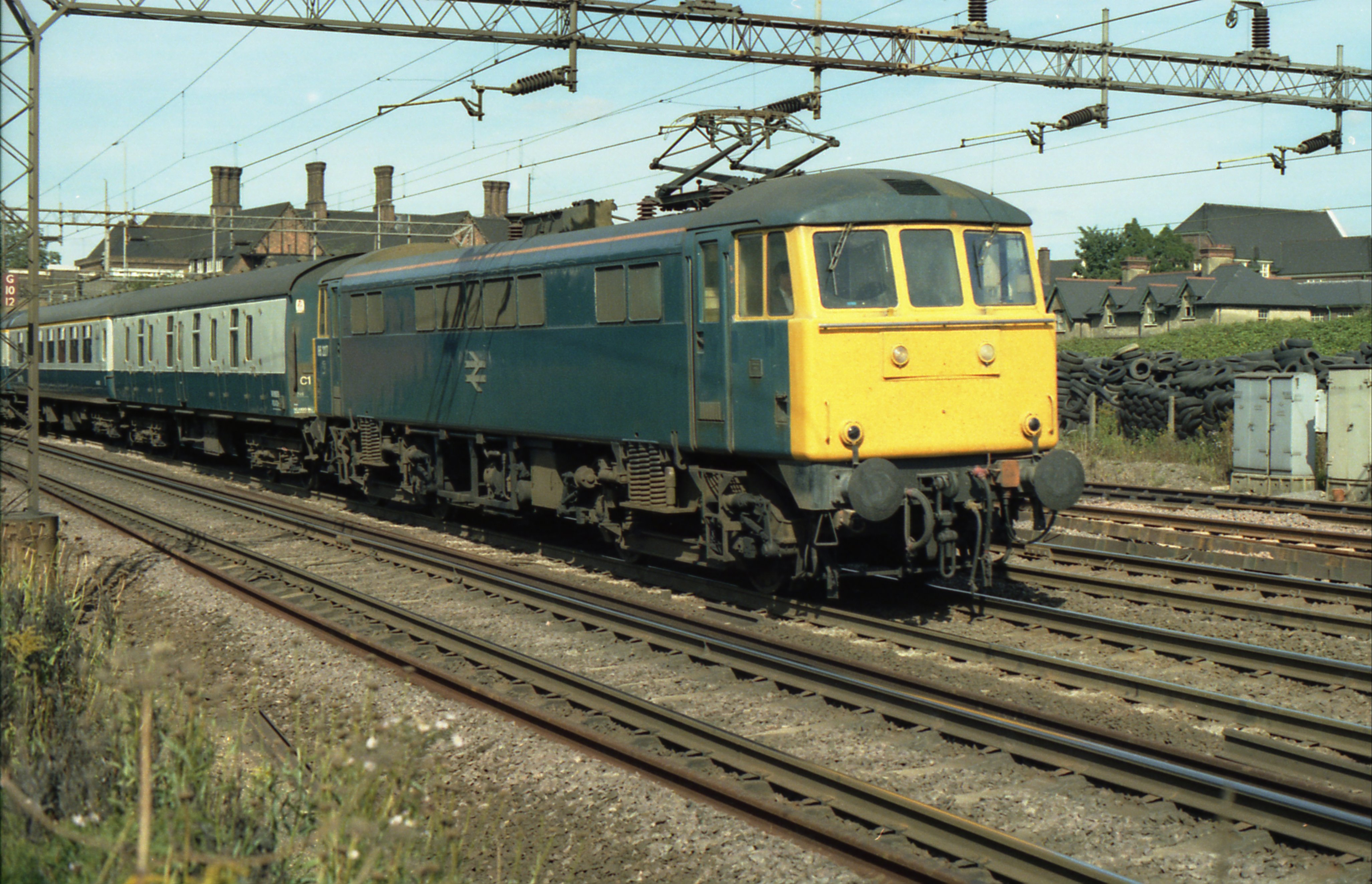
Electric express hauled by a Class 86 on the West Coast Main Line in the 1970s

West Coast Main Line:

- Electrified from London Euston during the late 1950s and mid-1960s using the Mark 1 series under the BR 1955 Modernisation Plan to Crewe, extended to Glasgow Central in 1974 using the Mark 3A range.
- Northampton: see Northampton loop.
- Birmingham New Street: see Rugby–Birmingham–Stafford line.
- Crewe to Liverpool Lime Street.
- Stafford to Manchester Piccadilly: see Stafford–Manchester line and Crewe–Manchester line.
- The "Abbey Flyer" (Abbey Line) was electrified in 1987–88 by Network SouthEast.
- Edinburgh Waverley in 1989 (from Carstairs Junction in conjunction with East Coast Main Line electrification)
- In 2003, the Crewe–Kidsgrove section of the Crewe–Derby line was electrified as a diversionary route for the WCML.
- Since 1999, the line has been modernised and the overhead line equipment has been refurbished and renewed from Mark 1 / Mark 3A to UK1 range to allow an increase line speeds from 110 mph to 125 mph (with 140 mph capability in areas previously fitted with Automatically Tensioned Mark 1 equipment - subject to upgrading of the balance weight arrangement to provide individually tensioned contact / catenary wires and regrading of the contact wires). At the same time sections of the line are being progressively changed to autotransformer system.

Midland Main Line:

- Electrified between London St Pancras and Bedford in 1983 using the Mark 3B range, and Dock Junction to Moorgate - now cut back to City Thameslink.
- Electrification from Bedford to Kettering and Corby using the UK Master Series (MS125) range (MML Phase 1), further extensions to Leicester, Nottingham Trent Junction and Sheffield (via Derby) by 2023 (MML Phase 2) were cancelled in July 2017. In November 2021, the Integrated Rail Plan (IRP) was published. This included full Midland Main Line electrification. On 21 December 2021 it was announced that work would start immediately on electrification of the section between Kettering and Market Harborough. Grant Shapps claimed this work was proof the IRP was being implemented quickly but was met with ridicule. Currently, electrification has been completed up to Wigston and Corby, despite the previous cancellation of these plans.

High Speed 1:

- Newest main line, completed in 2007. Links London St Pancras with Ashford International and the Channel Tunnel.

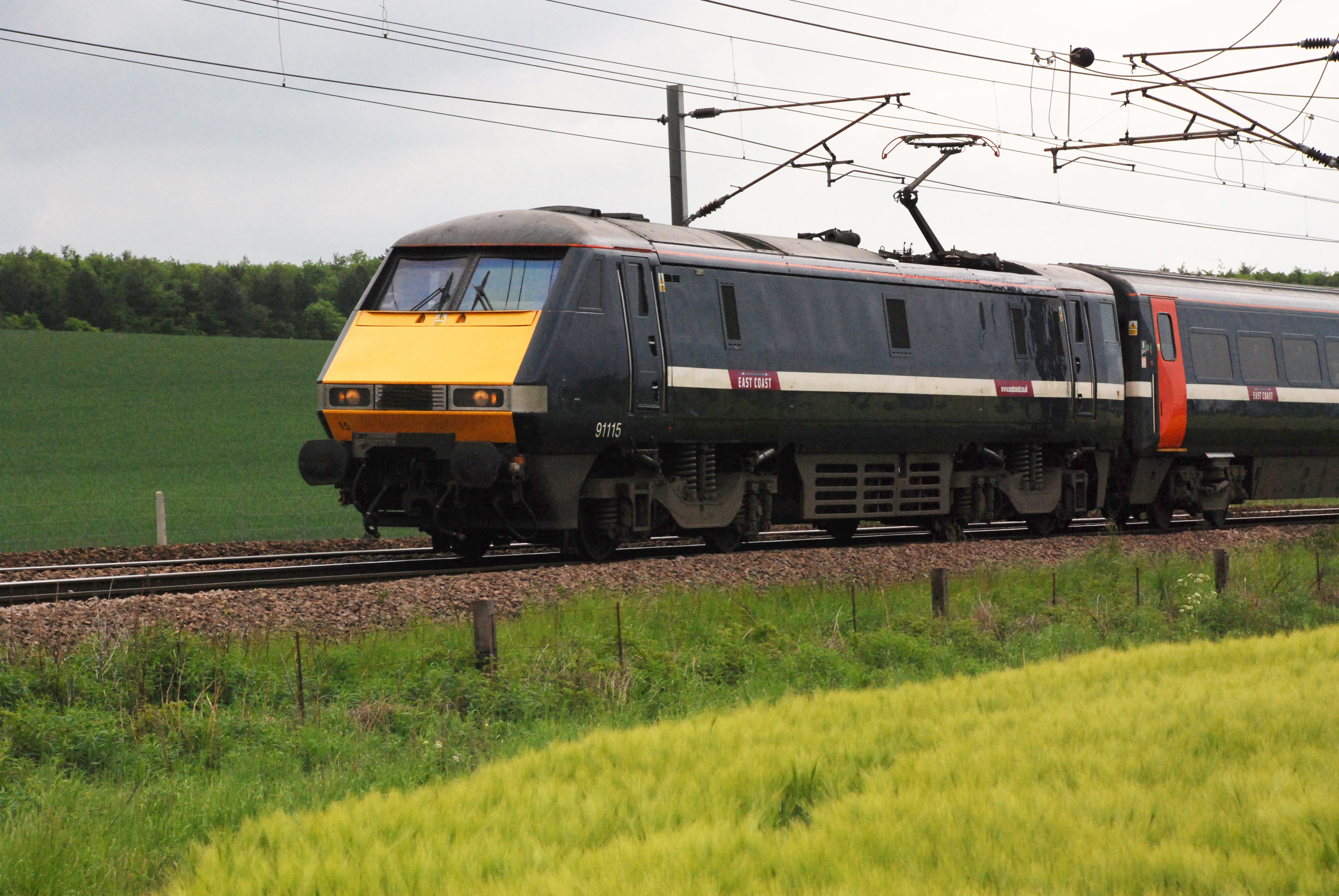
InterCity 225 on the East Coast Main Line

East Coast Main Line:

- Electrified in two parts: 1975–78, and 1984–91
- The line between London King's Cross and Royston was electrified between 1976 and 1978 using the Mark 3A range as part of the Great Northern Suburban Electrification Project. This included the Hertford loop line. The section between Royston and Cambridge was electrified in 1988 using the Mark 3B range.
- In 1984, authority was given to electrify to Edinburgh and Leeds. The section between Hitchin and Peterborough was completed in 1987, and Doncaster and York were reached in 1989. By 1990, electrification had reached Newcastle, and in 1991 Edinburgh Waverley. The Mark 3B range was used throughout the electrification scheme, certain areas are presently being upgraded to the Mark 3D design range, this will eliminate known corrosion issues with the AWAC catenary and replace solid stainless steel droppers with flexible copper current carrying designs. Some headspan to portal conversions are also taking place.
- In order to keep construction teams working, two additional schemes were authorised, to Carstairs and North Berwick (North Berwick Line).
- At the peak of the electrification project during the late 1980s, it was claimed to be the "longest construction site in the world" at over 250 miles (400 km).

West Anglia / Fen Line: This covers the lines from London Liverpool Street (Bethnal Green Junction) to Chingford, Enfield Town, Hertford East and Cambridge. In the 1960s, the lines to Chingford, Enfield Town and Cheshunt were electrified at 6.25 kV, from Cheshunt to Bishop's Stortford and Hertford East at 25 kV. The Lea Valley line between Coppermill Junction and Cheshunt was electrified at 25 kV in 1969. All the 6.25 kV areas were converted to 25 kV in 1983. In 1987, electrification was extended from Bishop's Stortford to Cambridge at 25 kV. In 1990 the line to Stansted Airport opened, and in 1992 electrification was extended from Cambridge to King's Lynn along the Fen Line.

Great Eastern Main Line:

- London Liverpool Street to Norwich.
- Converted from 1,500 V DC (see 1,500 V DC section "Shenfield Metro")

Converted from 6.25 kV/1,500 V DC to a combination of AT and FT 25 kV Mark GE (Great Eastern) between 1976 and 1980. Presently being upgraded to the GEFF (Great Eastern Furrer + Frey) range altering the catenary from a compound to simple sagged arrangement.

- Romford–Upminster line
- Shenfield–Southend line
- Crouch Valley line
- Braintree branch line
- Mayflower line
- Sunshine Coast Line

London, Tilbury and Southend line: London Fenchurch Street to Shoeburyness. The majority was originally electrified at 6.25 kV, final sections converted to 25 kV in March 1989.

London Overground: Local lines within London electrified with 25 kV are:

- North London line, between Acton Central and Stratford.
- Lea Valley lines
- Gospel Oak to Barking line
- Various other suburban lines in the north of the city are electrified as part of other routes mentioned above.

West Midlands:

- West Coast Main Line routes electrified in the 1960s:
  - Trent Valley line
  - Stone to Colwich Line
  - Rugby–Birmingham–Stafford line
  - Stafford–Manchester line
  - Walsall–Wolverhampton line
- Commuter lines out of Birmingham New Street:
  - Cross-City Line: electrified 1993
  - Chase Line: New Street to Rugeley Trent Valley completed 2017

Manchester and North West area:

- Manchester to Glossop / Hadfield (converted from the truncated 1,500 V DC Manchester-Sheffield-Wath electric railway)
- Manchester to Liverpool via Earlestown line: electrified in 2015 as part of the Northern Hub project.
- Manchester, South Junction and Altrincham Railway (part was converted to Manchester Metrolink)
- Styal Line: including branch to Manchester Airport
- Manchester–Preston line: via Bolton and Chorley completed 2019
- Preston to Blackpool North: completed 2018
- Stafford–Manchester line: branch of the WCML, electrified in the wake of the BR 1955 Modernisation Plan
- Crewe–Manchester line: branch of the WCML, electrified in the wake of the 1955 Modernisation Plan
- Manchester–Southport line: partially electrified between Wigan Station Junction and Crow Nest Junction (East of Hindley station) energised on 1 January 2025
- Westhoughton Branch (Crow Nest Junction to Lostock Junction): energised 1 January 2025

Leeds area: In 1994, a project to electrify some of the local lines around Leeds was given authority to proceed. The project was called the "Leeds North West Electrification", which electrified:

- Airedale line to Skipton and Bradford Forster Square
- Wharfedale line to Ilkley
- Wakefield line electrified in 1989 as part of the East Coast Main Line electrification to London King's Cross
- In 2020 the electrification of the first part of the stalled TransPennine project, from Leeds to Dewsbury and Huddersfield, was approved and work also commenced on the York to Church Fenton section of the York to Leeds line.
- Electrification has now been completed between York and Church Fenton North.

Edinburgh:

- In 1991, the ECML to Edinburgh was electrified. A few local routes were also electrified.
- Edinburgh Crossrail: Edinburgh Waverley to Newcraighall. The service is by DMUs, pending reopening of part of the Waverley Route.
- North Berwick Line: Edinburgh Waverley to North Berwick
- Glasgow–Edinburgh via Carstairs line: some North Berwick Line trains continue to Glasgow Central. Intercity trains from the ECML continue to Glasgow Central.

Central Scotland: The route from Edinburgh to Glasgow via Bathgate has been reinstated between Bathgate and Airdrie and electrified throughout. It opened on 11 December 2010. The electrification of the main inter-city route between Edinburgh and Glasgow Queen Street High Level via Falkirk was completed in 2017. The project, known as the Edinburgh to Glasgow Improvement Programme, entailed infill electrification in the Glasgow area and Greenhill Junction to Stirling, Dunblane and Alloa, which mainly carry commuter services. Electric services on these lines commenced in December 2018.

Glasgow Suburban: Suburban electrification begun during the 1960s in the wake of the BR 1955 Modernisation Plan. Electrification was piecemeal and is still incomplete, with a few commuter lines still unelectrified such as Maryhill Line, and the Glasgow South Western Line south of Barrhead.

The Glasgow Suburban railway network can be divided into three main areas:

- North Clyde Line: also known as the "Northern Electrics", one of the first lines in Glasgow electrified in 1960 (Helensburgh Central, Balloch and Milngavie to Glasgow Queen Street (Low Level) and to Springburn and Airdrie).
- South Clyde: the Cathcart Circle Line (Glasgow Central to Newton and Neilston) was electrified on 22 May 1962. The Inverclyde Line (Glasgow Central to Gourock and Wemyss Bay) was electrified in 1967. The Ayrshire Coast Line (Glasgow Central to Ayr, Largs and Ardrossan Harbour) was electrified in 1986–1987. The Paisley Canal line was electrified to Corkerhill from Glasgow Central in the late 1980s and the full line was electrified in late 2012.
- Argyle Line: between Dalmuir and Milngavie via Glasgow Central (Low Level) to Hamilton Circle, Larkhall, Lanark and Carstairs (via Hamilton, Motherwell or Holytown). There is also peak service to Coatbridge Central.

The Shotts Line, Holytown Junction to Kirknewton was electrified in April 2019. The Cumbernauld Line to Springburn and the remaining section of the Motherwell–Cumbernauld line was electrified in mid 2014. The Whifflet Line between Whifflet and Rutherglen via Carmyle was electrified in late 2014. In December 2023 electrification of the South western line was completed up to Barrhead and in December 2025 the East Kilbride branch line was fully electrified.

==== 2010s Network Rail electrification programme ====
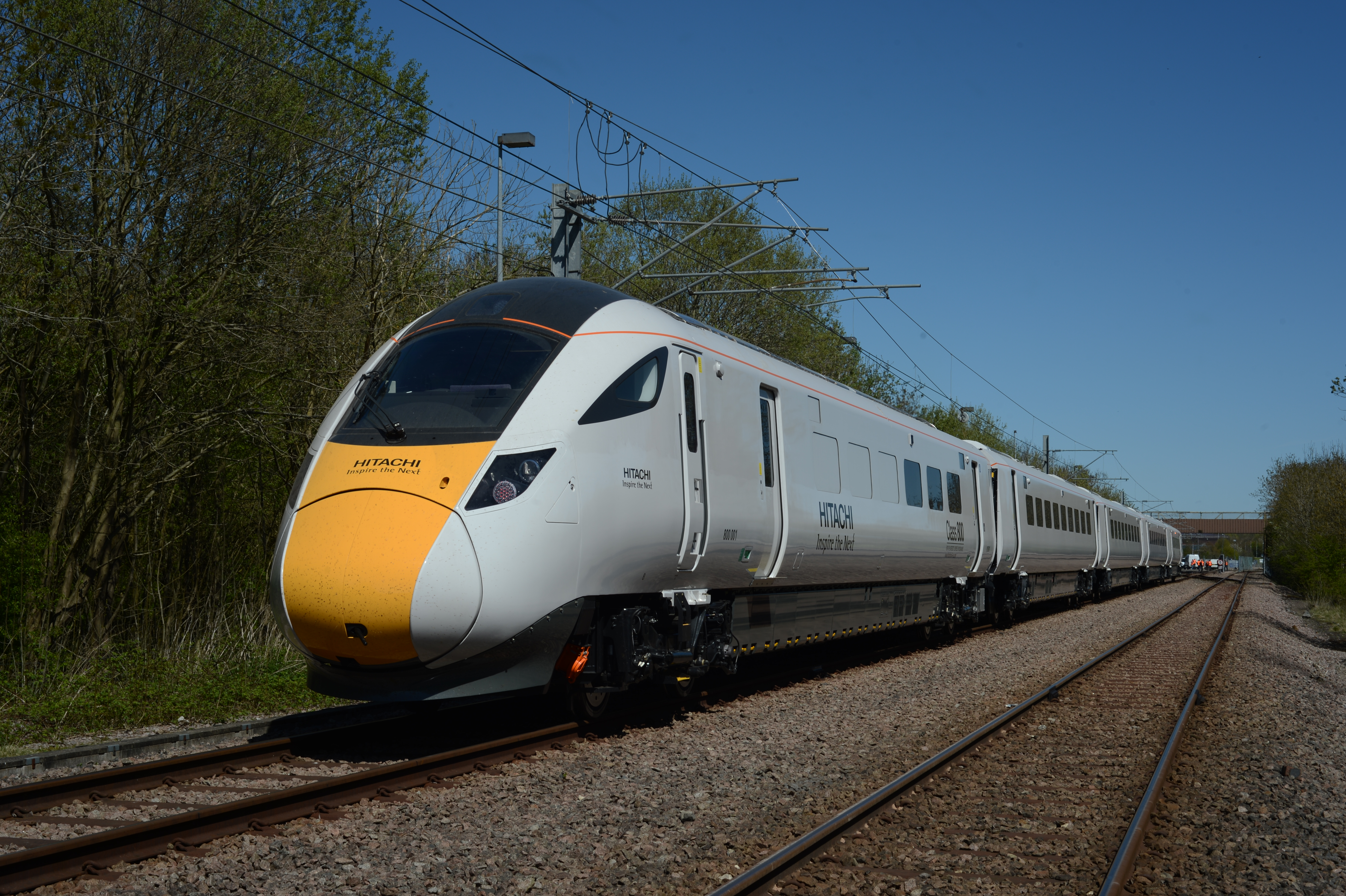
A Class 800, for use on some of the newly electrified lines, being tested in 2015

In 2009, Lord Adonis was appointed Secretary of State for Transport. After a gap of more than a decade, electrification was back on the agenda and Adonis announced plans to electrify the Great Western Main Line from London to Swansea, as well as infill electrification schemes in the North West of England. In July 2012, the UK government announced £4.2 billion of new electrification schemes, all at 25 kV AC and reconfirmed schemes previously announced by Adonis. These were to be Northern Hub, Great Western Main Line, South Wales Main Line, Midland Main Line, Electric Spine, Crossrail, Gospel Oak to Barking line and West Midlands suburban lines. Rail transport in Scotland is a devolved matter for the Scottish Government but they too have pursued electrification with multiple schemes in the Central Belt. All these have been 25 kV AC also as in England and Wales. Electrification has not been without controversy with cancellations and various appearances of the Secretary of State for Transport called before the Transport Select Committee. The number of route miles electrified in these years was answered to a written question in parliament.

In November 2019 the annual statistics for route miles electrified was published by the DfT and shows that 38% of the UK network is now electrified.

The projects have been subject to cost overruns and delays, and on 8 November 2016 the government announced that several elements of the Great Western Main Line electrification programme would be indefinitely deferred. In an attempt to mitigate and improve the cost situation the Railway Industry Association published a report in March 2019 detailing why costs had risen and suggested ways forward.

However, in the new parliament after the 2019 General election, the Transport Select Committee chaired by Huw Merriman has met on a number of occasions and continued the "Trains fit for the future" enquiry theme started by the previous committee. On 23 March 2021, after many witnesses were called and written and oral evidence considered, a report was released calling for an immediate resumption of electrification in a rolling programme. However, in December 2021 The Telegraph reported that the Treasury had declined to support the electrification programme. Reputable peer-reviewed journals state that electrification is the most relevant technology for reducing transports effect on the environment.

==== Feeding Arrangements (Classic) ====
The majority of the 25 kV AC in Great Britain network utilises the "Classic" AC feeding system. This refers to a setup where railway feeder stations connect to two (of the three) phases at grid supply point and distribute one phase directly to the overhead line at 25 kV and the other phase is grounded to the running rails and any return conductors. In order not to unduly disbalance the public utility grid, railway substations must connect to different phase combinations at each feeding point and can only connect to the 132 kV network or higher (in the UK 275 kV or 400 kV). Connecting the OLE system directly to different phase combinations means that supplies from adjoining feeder stations must be separated at the OLE level by a neutral section: a short stretch of earthed OLE insulating the supply from each side under which the train's circuit breaker is automatically opened. Some feeder stations just connect one grid supply (tee-feeding) to the OLE but most have two supplies, each of which feed one of the directions from the feeder station with a neutral section fitted at the OLE.

Feeder Stations (FS) are separated from each other by another type of substation called the mid-point track sectioning cabin (MPTSC) which are also fitted with a neutral section. In addition, intermediate track sectioning cabins (TSC) are added along the route (often at junctions) to provide sections to quickly discharge traction current. Track sectioning cabins (and technically all substations) also reduce system impedance by paralleling all OLE circuits at the substation busbar. The OLE under an intermediate TSC is electrically separate, but since both sides are on the same supply, a neutral section is not needed. Instead, a section insulator or insulated overlap is used.

The busbars within FSs and MPTSCs allow for supply points to be switched out and adjacent supplies to be extended across the railway. The typical distance between feeder stations is between 40 and 60 km (25 and 37 miles), between feeder station and midpoint TSC is between 20 and 30 km (12 and 19 miles), and between intermediate TSCs is between 10 and 15 km (6.2 and 9.3 miles). In practice, the distance between and arrangement of substations rarely conforms to these theoretical norms. The logical order of substations is often made complex by additions being made to feed extensions to the system or to support higher traffic demands or higher speeds.

In order to mitigate electromagnetic interference (EMI), a return conductor (RC) is hung adjacent to the contact wire on the OLE system. This is connected to the running rails and takes the majority of the return current from the trains. Since the current in the RC runs in the opposite direction to that in the contact wire, the resultant EMI is minimised since the electromagnetic fields generated by each current oppose each other and so cancel each other out. In order to maximise how much current is sent through the return conductor rather than the running rails, 1:1 ratio current transformers are regularly affixed (around every 5 km) to the OLE and are known as booster transformers (BT). At the booster transformer, the primary winding is connected in series to the contact wire, and the secondary connected in series to the return conductor. From its connection to the OLE, the BT induces an equal and opposite current in the RC which is then collected from the running rails wherever the RC is bonded to the rail. The system of booster transformers and return conductors (referred to as RC/BT) effectively mitigates electromagnetic interference but does increase system impedance limiting overall power capacity.

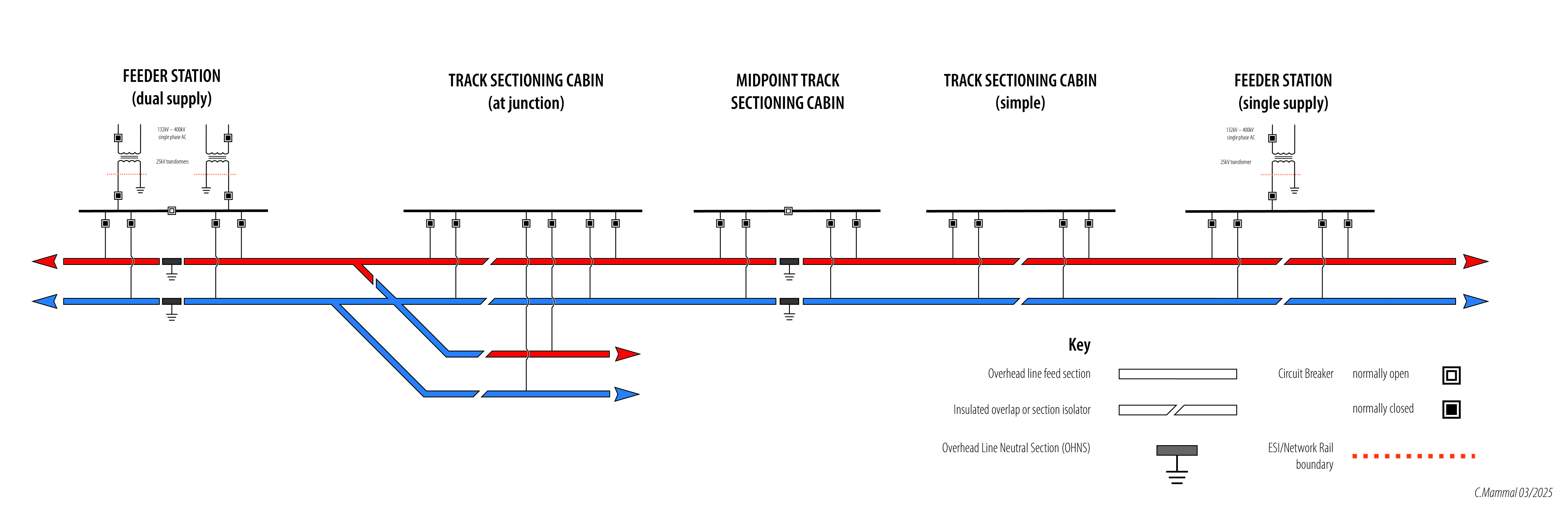
Generic arrangement of railway substations for 25 kV classic feeding

==== Feeding Arrangements (Autotransformer) ====
A handful of lines are electrified with the 2x 25 kV autotransformer (AT) system. This is mostly similar to the classic arrangement in terms of differing phase intakes and neutral sections. The main difference is that an additional conductor is hung adjacent to the OLE (the AT feed wire or ATF) electrified at -25 kV that regularly interconnects to the +25 kV contact wire at minor substations fitted with autotransformers. The autotransformers allow the additional current in the -25 kV feed to support the supply in the contact wire significantly reducing volt drop and supplying more overall power. Substations fitted with autotransformers can be thought of as proxy feeder stations that take a supply from a 50 kV ring (located in the ATF wire which is at 50 kV respective to the OLE) and transform it to 25 kV for the contact wire. The ATF also performs an additional role of minimising the electromagnetic interference caused by the electrification system since the current in the ATF travels in the opposite direction to that in the contact wire mimicking the functionality of the return conductor on the classic system. Furthermore, the multiple autotransformers that link the ATF and contact wire provide the same EMI mitigation functionality as booster transformers on a RC/BT system. AT systems therefore never have return conductors or booster transformers.

The grid supply is taken at an autotransformer feeder station (ATFS) which provides a 50 kV single phase supply (being double the voltage of a conventional traction substation, all AT systems connect to the 257 kV or 400 kV transmission network) and is split at a centre tapped autotransformer. The centre tap is grounded to the running rails while the +25 kV side connects to the contact wire and the -25 kV side to the AT feed wire. Further autotransformers are fitted at all other substations to allow the additional power in the ATF wire to supply the contact wire. AT systems have different names for equivalent substations as are used on the classic system:

- Autotransformer feeder station (ATFS) instead of FS
- Mid-point autotransformer site (MPATS) instead of MPTSC
- Sectioning autotransformer site (SATS) instead of TSC
- And a new type: autotransformer site (ATS) which is similar to an SATS but has no circuit breakers and so is mainly used purely to connect the contact wire and ATF together.

As of 2025, the autotransformer system is currently in operation on the following lines.

- Wales and Western
  - GWML: London Paddington to (north of) Chippenham
  - South Wales Main Line: Wooten Basset Junction to Cardiff Central
- Anglia
  - GEML: Bow Junction/Pudding Mill Lane (between Stratford and London Liverpool Street) to Gidea Park
  - Crossrail Central Operating Section: Westbourne Park to Pudding Mill Lane/Abbey Wood
- Eastern
  - MML: St Pancras/Farringdon to Borehamwood
- WCML
  - Bourne End (between Hemel Hempstead and Berkhamsted) to Whitmore (between Stafford and Crewe)
    - Including all of the Northampton Loop
    - Short section of the Stafford–Manchester Line from Norton Bridge to Stone.
  - Weaver Junction (between Acton Bridge and Warrington Bank Quay) to Euxton Junction (near Euxton Balshaw Lane)
  - Hest Bank (south of Carnforth) to Great Strickland (between Penrith and Oxenholme)
- North West
  - Baguley Fold Junction (east of Manchester Victoria) to Stalybridge
  - Chat Moss Line: Windsor Street (west of Manchester Victoria) to Edge Hill
  - Manchester–Preston Line: Windsor Street to Euxton Junction
- HS1
  - St Pancras to Channel Tunnel Portal

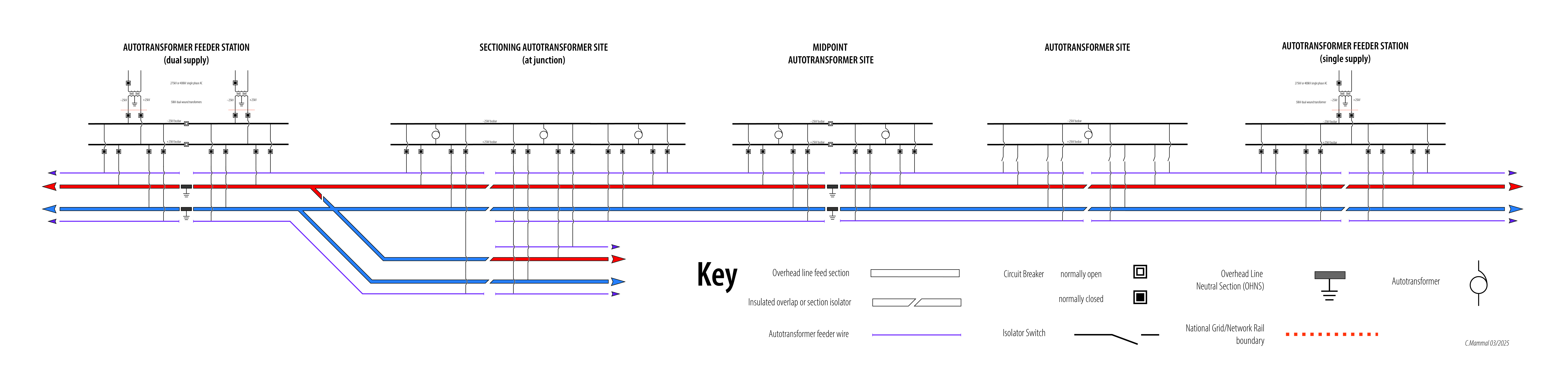
Generic setup for a 2x25 kV autotransformer fed railway

=== Other systems ===
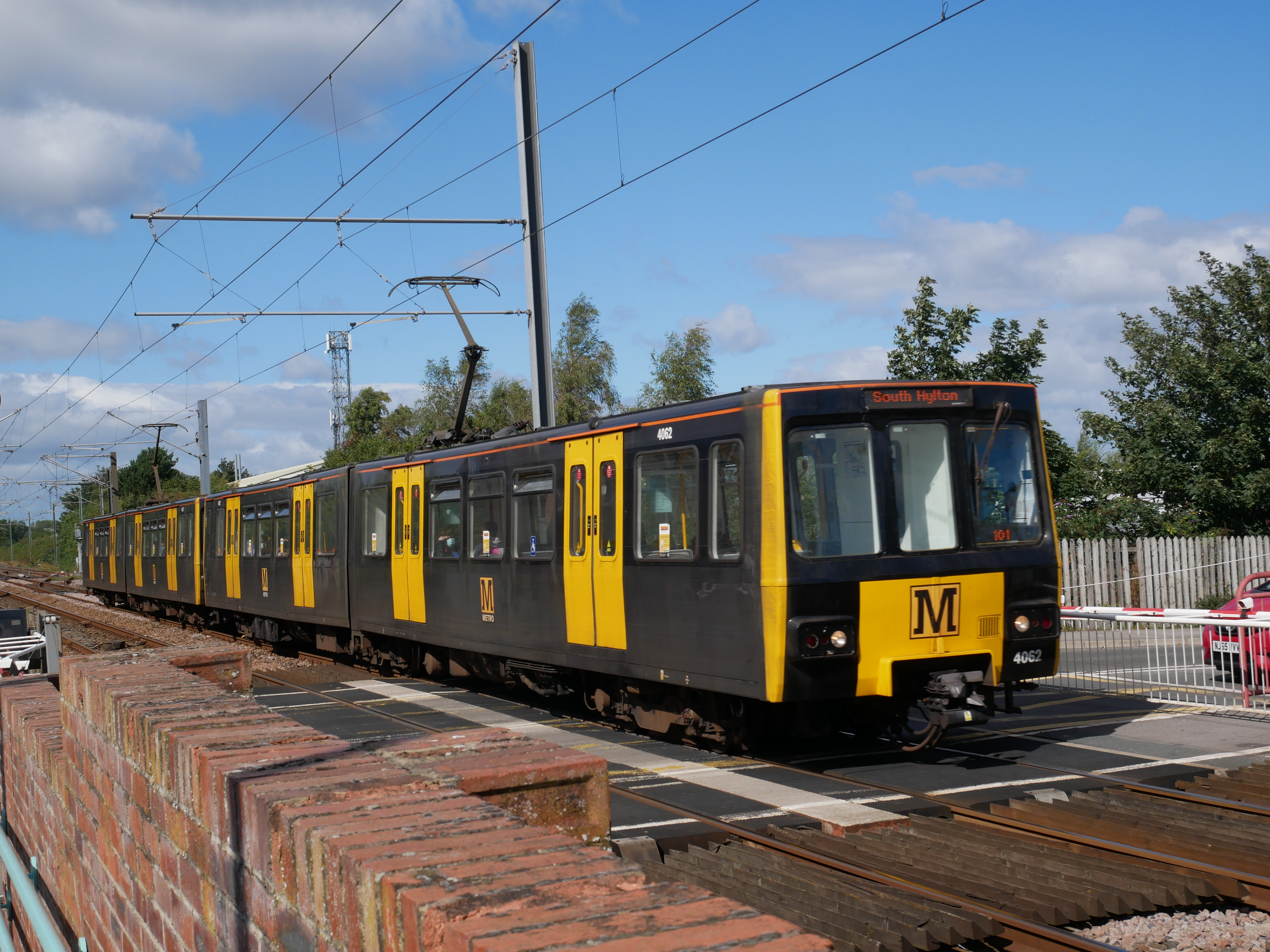
The Tyne and Wear Metro is the only 1,500 V DC system in the UK.

==== 1,500 V DC, overhead ====
- Tyne and Wear Metro: The Tyne & Wear Metro, which opened in 1980, is now the only system left in the UK using the 1500 V DC overhead lines. Although it is often described as "light rail", it is closer to a heavy metro, using only segregated track. Much of its route follows that of the previous Tyneside Electrics, which had been converted to diesel by 1967. Since 2002, the Metro has shared main-line track on the Durham Coast Line to Sunderland. This presents a potential problem for main-line services if routes into Sunderland or Newcastle upon Tyne that use this section were to be electrified at 25 kV AC.

Historically, there were more lines electrified at 1,500 V DC, but these have all since been either converted to 25 kV AC or closed. (see 1,500 V DC, overhead (historic))

==== 750 V DC, overhead ====
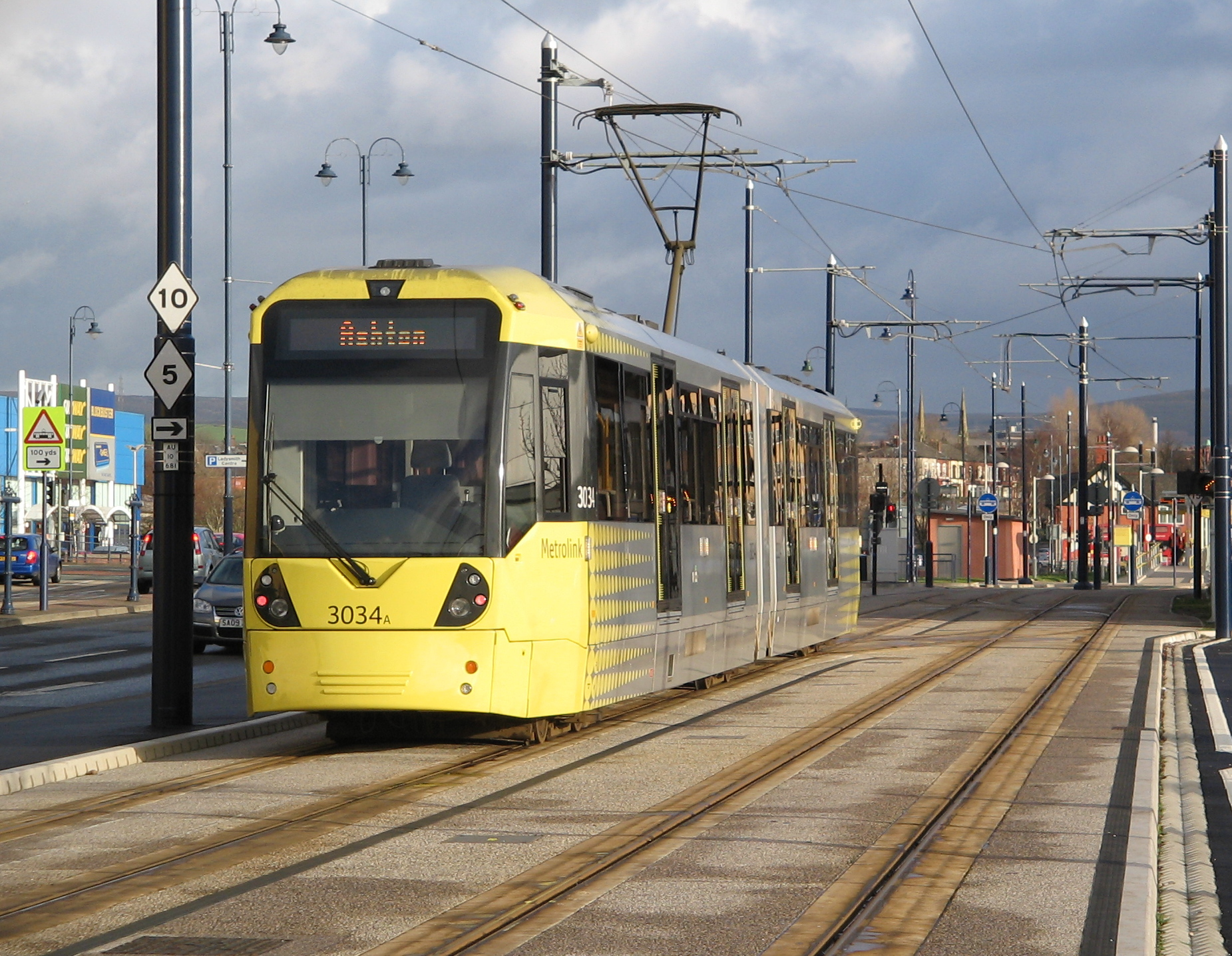
Tram on the Manchester Metrolink. Like most modern tram systems, it uses 750 V DC.

Used on several tram systems:

- Edinburgh Trams
- Manchester Metrolink
- South Yorkshire Supertram
- London Trams
- Nottingham Express Transit
- West Midlands Metro

==== Other overhead systems ====
- Blackpool Tramway: originally 550 V DC, in 2011 upgraded to 600 V to operate more modern rolling stock.
- The National Tramway Museum at Crich, Derbyshire uses 600 V DC. This voltage was chosen for maximum compatibility with its historic fleet of trams as well as more modern units.
- The Wirral Tramway uses 550 V DC.
- The Seaton Tramway uses 120 V DC.

=== Overhead Line System Types ===
An overhead line (OLE) system type refers to a basic design range that defines all components, materials, geometry, parameters and mechanical characteristics of an OLE system. Different OLE system types dictate the designs of small steel dressings, suspension/stitching arrangement and tensioning equipment. Certain OLE types are associated with the use of particular electrification support structures although it is common nowadays for OLE types to include designs for all types of structure and tensioning arrangements. In some cases, design ranges are created specifically to enable an upgrade to an older OLE system. These designs are typically designed to integrate with pre-existing support structures (masts, portals, etc.) put provide new tensioning configurations, steel dressings, and OLE wires.

==== 25 kV AC heavy rail network ====
The basic design ranges of OLE systems used on the heavy rail network are summarised below.

- GE/MSW (Great Eastern and Manchester to Wath & Sheffield)
  - Developed by LNER in the 1930s for the 1.5 kV DC electrification between London Liverpool Street and Shenfield. It was also applied to 1.5 kV DC electrification over the former Woodhead Route in 1954. Equipment was altered over the years to accompany both lines' conversions to AC. The range made frequent use of heavy duty and imposing portal structures as low voltage DC OLE wires are significantly heavier than those for high voltage AC systems since their cross section is thicker to allow for greater current. The original system used compound stitching and fixed tension wire runs throughout which are inclined to fail in warmer weather due to excessive sag. Almost no GE/MSW stitching and tensioning exists on the GEML network all having been upgraded to GEFF, although many of the original portals remain in use. The remaining section of the Woodhead Route is still believed to use original equipment altered for 25 kV AC.
- SCS (Shenfield, Chelmsford & Southend)
  - Developed for the extension of 1.5 kV lines on the Great Eastern Main Line to Chelmsford and Southend Victoria in 1956. It is mostly the same as previous GE/MSW equipment and saw alterations for AC working. None of the tensioning and stitching remains in use as all has been replaced by GEFF equipment.
- Mark 1
  - The first standard design created by British Rail in the early 1960s for use on 25 kV AC lines. Mechanically independent registration is provided by default requiring the using of many multi-track portal structures. The system incorporated auto-tensioning for the first time in the UK which was the standard for all types afterwards. Mark 1 was rolled out on the earliest AC systems on the southern sections of WCML, on some lines in East Anglia and the Glasgow suburbs.
- Mark 2
  - A short-lived development of the Mark 1 type seen on some lines in the Glasgow suburban network. It was the first type to use galvanised steel on the steel dressings.
- Brown Boveri
  - Originally intended for the second stage of the Glasgow South Suburban scheme instead of Mark 1 but the specification switched to Mark 2 during design. Therefore, the Brown Boveri range was only constructed on the branch from Cathcart to Neilston. Uniquely, it's the only kind of British OLE to use simple stitched OLE equipment.
- Mark 3
  - The most common type of OLE constructed in the British Rail era and used on almost all new-build electrification from 1969 to the early 2000s and can therefore be found on all parts of the AC network. It makes frequent use of galvanised steel on all parts and of headspan structures for multi-track areas to reduce capital cost. Multiple sub-ranges exist that iterated on previous short-comings, including mark 3a, 3b, 3c and 3d. Most designs developed after the Mark 3 types ceased the widespread use of headspan structures as their reliability problems had become well known in the intervening years.
- Mark 4
  - Developed for the APT project but never used.
- Mark 5
  - A variation of Mark 3c to accommodate a thicker contact wire for high current levels. It was only used on Dollands Moor freight yard.
- UK1
  - Developed in the late 1990s in order to raise top speeds on sections of the WCML as part of the West Coast Main Line Route Modernisation. Where used, it replaced Mark 1 and Mark 3a equipment.
- ATF Range
  - Developed alongside UK1 and implemented where sections of the West Coast Main Line were slated for upgrade to autotransformer feeding. It is designed to fit onto and around other OLE sub-types to provide fittings for an AT feed wire. It has also been used on the autotransformer upgrade of Paddington to Stockley on GWML.
- SICAT (Siemens Catenary)
  - Introduced in 2005 for some new-build projects in Scotland.
- GEFF
  - Introduced between 2007 and 2022 on the Great Eastern Main Line from London Liverpool Street to Chelmsford and on the Southend Victoria line to fully replace the GE/MSW and SCS types that dated from 1949 and 1956 respectively. It re-used many of the original portal and cantilever structures of the original system but comprehensively replaced tensioning, suspension and steel dressing components.
- UK Master Series (UKMS)
  - A common catalogue of OLE basic designs for use on all projects since the 2010s.
    - Series 1 (UKMS140)
      - Developed for use on all new installations from the early 2010s designed with the 2 x 25 kV autotransformer system and speeds up to 225 km/h (140 mph) in mind. Used on the 21st century electrification programmes on the Great Western Main Line and Midland Main Line.
    - Series 2 (UKMS100, UKMS125)
      - Developed alongside Series 1 as a medium speed (160 km/h, 100 mph) OLE type roughly based on the older Mark 3c but with mechanically independent registration and modern support arrangements as default. It has also been updated to support 200 km/h (125 mph) speeds.
    - UKMSR1
      - A range developed for the upgrading and renewing Mark 1 equipment on the WCML that wasn't originally modernised to UK1 in the early 2000s.

Other mainline railways not owned by Network Rail (Crossrail Central Operating Section, HS1, Channel Tunnel) use their own bespoke OLE types not listed here.

== Existing systems – third and fourth rails ==
=== National Rail: 650 V - 750 V DC, third rail (top contact) ===
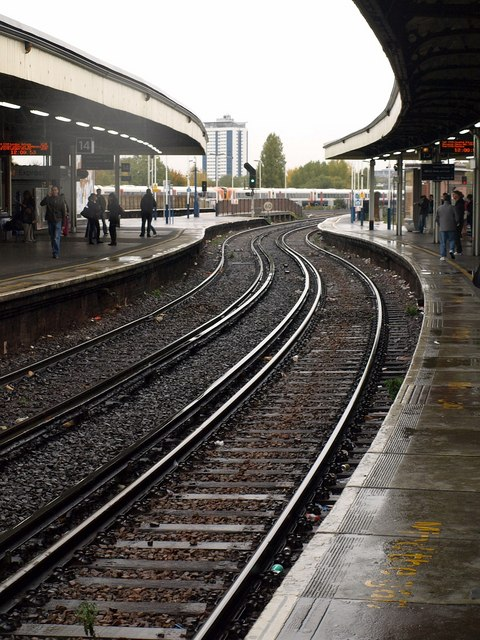
Lines through Clapham Junction are equipped with third rail electrification.

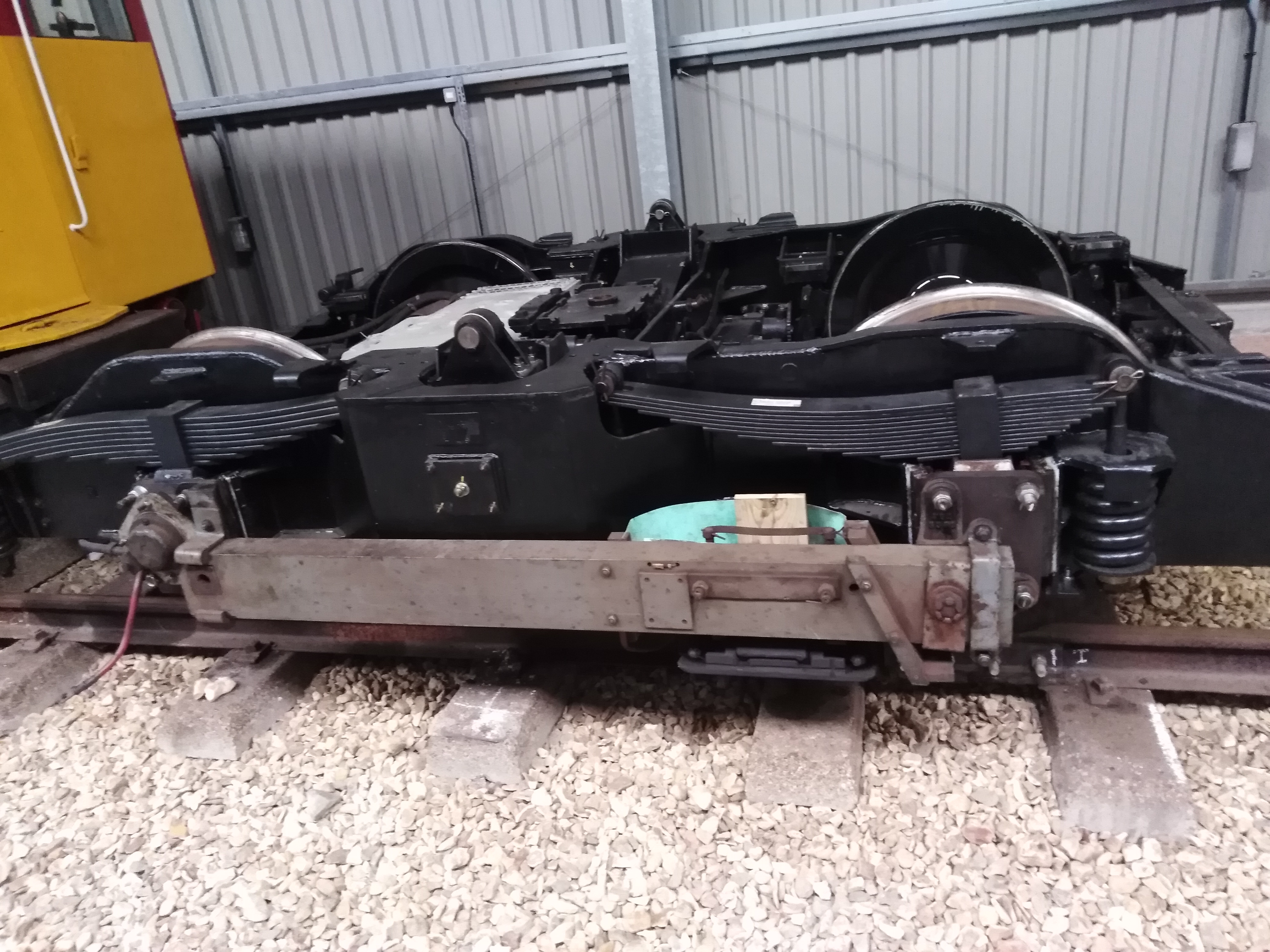
A bogie of a British Rail Class 483 electric multiple unit. The black contact shoe for the third-rail system can be seen suspended from the sacrificial wooden shoe beam.

==== Southern Electric ====
The extensive southern third rail electric network covers South London and the southern counties of Hampshire, West Sussex, East Sussex, Surrey and Kent and Dorset,

The London and South Western Railway (L&SWR) third-rail system at 660 V DC began before World War I from London Waterloo to suburban destinations. The Southern Railway was formed in the 1923 grouping; it adopted the L&SWR system, and by 1929 the London, Brighton and South Coast Railway (LB&SCR) suburban overhead network was replaced by third rail. The South Eastern Main Line was electrified at 600 V, later upgraded to 750 V DC. The third rail extended throughout most South London lines out of all its London termini. Throughout the 1930s, there was much main line electrification, including the Brighton Main Line (including East, West Coastways and related routes in 1932–1933), the Portsmouth Direct line (4 July 1937) and to Maidstone and Gillingham (1939).

After World War II, electrification was soon resumed in the newly nationalised British Railways' Southern Region. The BR 1955 Modernisation Plan included the two-stage "Kent Coast Electrification". The Chatham Main Line was completed, followed by the South Eastern Main Line and related lines. The voltage was raised from 660 V to 750 V. Since then, all electrification has used 750 V; lines electrified before then remain at 660 V. Attention then switched to the neglected former L&SWR area (then the South Western Division). The South West Main Line (SWML) to Southampton Central and Bournemouth was electrified in 1967 and to Weymouth in 1988.

During sectorisation in the 1980s, Network SouthEast conducted extensive infill electrification. The Snow Hill tunnel was reopened, enabling Thameslink. The Hastings Line, Eastleigh–Fareham line and the Oxted line (East Grinstead branch) were electrified. This left only a few lines unelectrified: the West of England line, the Wessex Main Line, the North Downs Line, the Oxted line (Uckfield branch), the Marshlink line and the Eastleigh–Romsey line.

==== Merseyrail ====
Two lines of the Merseyrail network; the Northern line and the Wirral line use 750 V DC third rail (see Suburban electrification of the London, Midland and Scottish Railway for its history).

==== Island Line (Isle of Wight) ====
The single remaining national rail line on the Isle of Wight, from Ryde Pierhead to Shanklin (with the Wroxall to Ventnor section closed), was electrified in 1967, so that former London Underground rolling stock could be used, due to the limited height of Ryde Tunnel. The Island Line used 660 V DC third rail, as it was a cheaper option to convert the LUL stock into third rail, and implement third rail only on the line. The rolling stock currently used is British Rail Class 484s (D-Train). The line was upgraded to a 750 V DC third rail system in 2021 to allow Class 484 units to be used.

==== London Overground ====
- Euston to Watford Junction (Watford DC line).
- Richmond to Stratford (North London line). 750 V DC third rail from Richmond to Acton Central.
- West London line. 750 V DC from near the location of the former St. Quintin Park & Wormwood Scrubs railway station to Clapham Junction (shared with Southern services).
- East London line. Highbury & Islington to New Cross station and the junctions with the South London network near New Cross Gate station and Queens Road Peckham station. Formerly, the East London Line was a much shorter London Underground line with fourth rail 630 V DC between Shoreditch (closed 2006) and New Cross/New Cross Gate.

See Suburban electrification of the London, Midland and Scottish Railway for Euston–Watford DC Line history.

In 1970, the North London DC lines and the Class 501 EMUs used on these services were converted for third-rail operation, with the fourth rail generally being removed on sections not used by London Underground (LUL). Some fourth rail was retained in the Gunnersbury and Queens Park areas for emergency use by LUL. With the closure of Broad Street, the North London line was joined with the Stratford to North Woolwich line; this was electrified with third rail and overhead line as far as Stratford, third rail to North Woolwich. Two branches of the Watford DC line have been closed: to Rickmansworth in 1952 (to passengers, to goods in 1967) and to Croxley Green in 1996.

The Watford DC line between Queen's Park and Harrow & Wealdstone and the North London Line between Richmond and Gunnersbury are used by London Overground trains designed for 750 V third rail and Bakerloo line trains designed for 630 V third and fourth rail. As a compromise, the nominal line voltage is 650 V, and since 1970 the centre rail has been bonded to the return running rail. There are no special provisions required at Queens Park, where the two dissimilar systems meet, just a gap longer than one coach of a Bakerloo line train at the entry to (and exit from) the Bakerloo, which operates with a nominal -210 V on the fourth rail and +420 V on the third rail. There is no bridging of the incompatible systems as trains pass from one to the other since, like all UK electric trains intended to run extensively in tunnels, there is no continuity of traction power circuits between vehicles of the train.

A similar arrangement applies between Putney Bridge and Wimbledon, where the District line runs over tracks owned by Network Rail, which is also used by South Western Railway, though normally only for stock movements.

==== Northern City Line ====
The Northern City Line connects the East Coast Main Line to Moorgate. It was isolated by the abandonment of the 1930s New Works Programme (and the development of the Metropolitan Green Belt). Tube services were truncated at its northern end by the Victoria line in 1964 at Drayton Park. The remainder was handed over to British Rail in 1975 in conjunction with the suburban electrification of the East Coast Main Line. The line uses third-rail DC electrification between Moorgate and Drayton Park, where trains switch to 25 kV AC overhead.

=== 630/750 V DC, fourth rail (top contact) ===
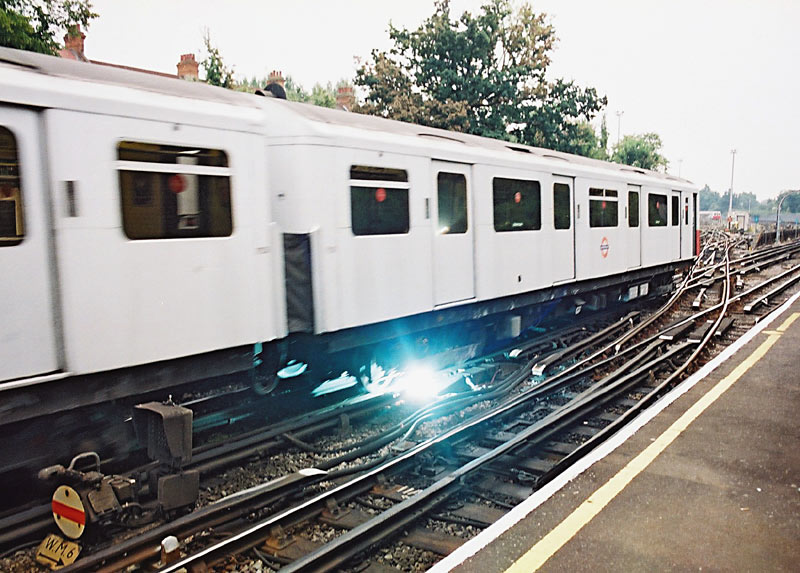
The London Underground fourth-rail system

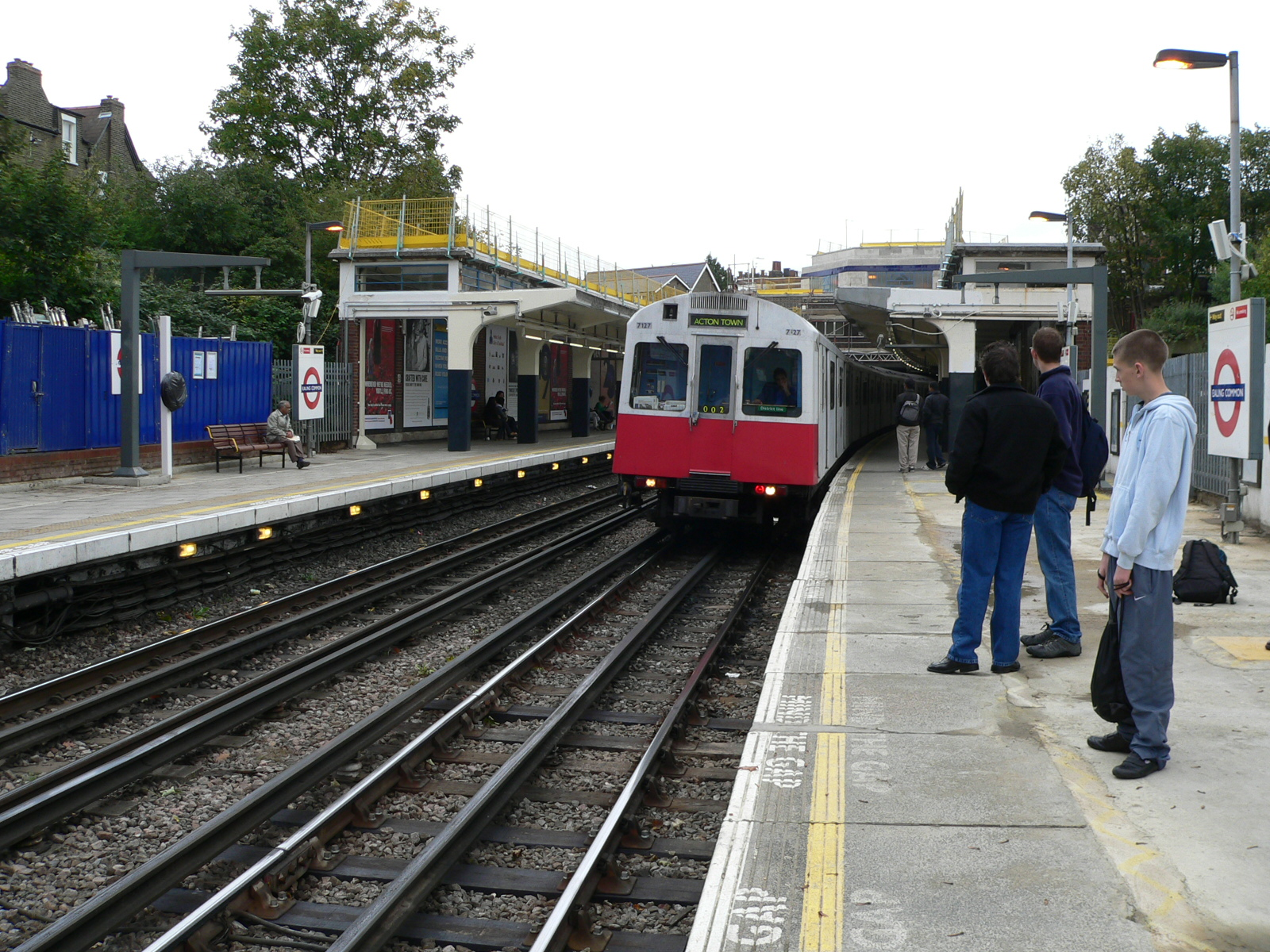
London Underground track, showing the third and fourth rails beside and between the running rails

==== London Underground ====
The London Underground is a large metro system operating across Greater London and beyond, commonly known as "the Tube". Its 408-kilometre (254 mi) is made up of 11 lines; electrification began during the 1890s. It was largely unified between 1900 and 1910 and nationalised in 1933, becoming the railway component of London Transport (LT). A major expansion programme (the "New Works") was launched, in which LT took over several urban branches of mainline railways.

The Underground is mostly in North London; its expansion into south London was limited by geology unfavourable to tunnelling and by the extensive main-line network, much of which was being electrified (see "Southern Electric"). The Underground uses a relatively uncommon four rail system of electrification. Two standard gauge rails are the running rails; the outer third rail carries positive current at +420 V DC and the inner fourth rail is the negative return at –210 V DC, giving a supply voltage of 630 V DC. The chief advantage of the fourth-rail system is that, in tunnels with a metallic (usually cast-iron) lining, the return traction current does not leak into the lining causing electrolytic corrosion there or in adjacent utility mains. It also means that the two running rails are available exclusively for track circuits.

The surface sections use the fourth rail solely for operational consistency: the system shares track with Network Rail in several places. Where the track is shared with 750 V third-rail stock, the central rail is bonded to the running rails and the outside rail electrified at 660 V. This allows both types of train to operate satisfactorily. The suburban network of the London & North Western Railway (LNWR) was electrified in co-operation with the Underground, but during the 1970s British Rail introduced third-rail EMUs and the sections of the LNWR suburban network not used by the Underground had the fourth rail removed (see "London and North Western Railway", above).

As part of the Four Lines Modernisation project, the subsurface lines have been upgraded to 750 V DC fourth rail operation, which is supported by the newer S7 and S8 stock. Where S-stock trains regularly interline with deep-level tube stock or where power supplies are shared, the voltage has been kept at 630 V DC since the rolling stock currently used on the Jubilee line and the Piccadilly line are incompatible with the higher voltage. As of February 2024, the only parts of the subsurface network which remain at a nominal 630 V are: between Finchley Road and Harrow-on-the-Hill (where the alignment and supply is shared with the Jubilee line), between Finchley Road and Uxbridge (where tracks are shared with the Piccadilly Line) and between Baron's Court and Ealing Broadway (where tracks are shared with the Piccadilly Line) but not on the Richmond and Wimbledon branches which have been upgraded to 750 V operation. The upgraded system allows for regenerative braking and the associated voltage surges, up to 890 V on the higher voltage tracks and up to 790 V or 650 V on the remaining 630 V tracks.

Except for the Waterloo and City line detailed below, the deep-level tube lines still operate at 630 V DC fourth rail although the new trains to be introduced onto the Piccadilly line support a 750 V line voltage which may imply that line will be upgraded.

==== Waterloo and City line ====
The use of 750 V DC fourth rail top contact came about because the line was originally owned by Railtrack and operated by Network South East. It was upgraded in 1992–1993 for both traction supply and rolling stock. Railtrack upgraded the original three rail system to four rail to solve problems with electrolytic damage to the iron tunnel linings (the reason four rail operation was adopted for all other tube lines). They also changed the voltage to 750 V which had been adopted as their standard DC operating voltage some years earlier. The line was subsequently sold to London Underground in 1994 who inherited the non-standard system (for London Underground's deep level lines). The line was still powered by Network Rail's mainline substation at Waterloo (and administered by their electrical control room at Raynes Park) until 2006 when Metronet refurbished the line bringing electrical supply and control into London Underground's infrastructure.

As part of the Four Lines Modernisation project, most of the subsurface network also operates at 750 V DC fourth rail.

=== 750 V DC, third rail (bottom contact) ===
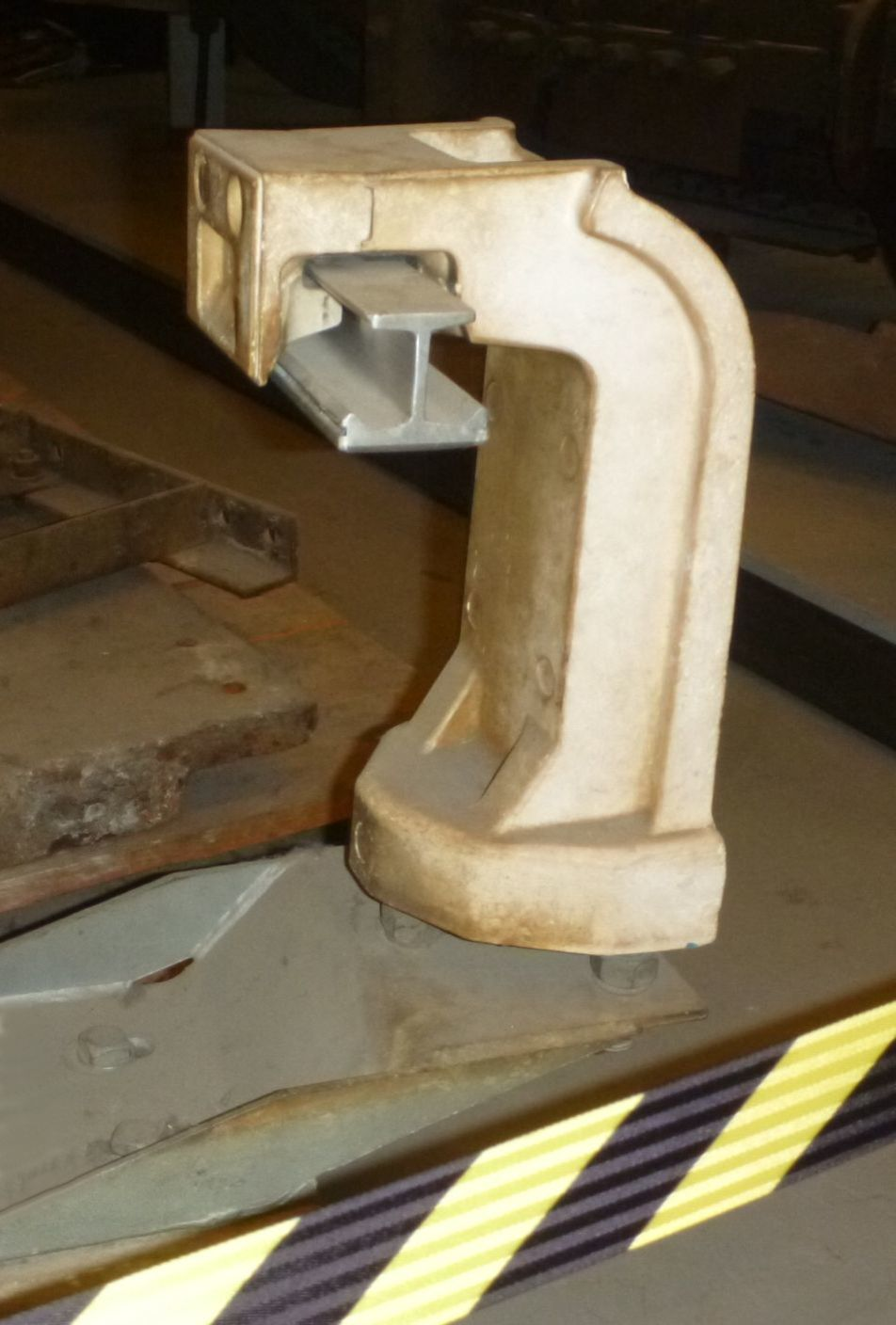
Support arm and short length of conductor rail

Docklands Light Railway

This uses bottom-contact composite third rail, with an aluminium body and a steel contact surface. The advantage of this is a low-resistance, high-current-capacity rail with a durable steel surface for current collection. The rail may be surrounded by insulating material on the top and sides to reduce the risk of electrocution to railway staff and trespassers. The bottom-contact system is less prone to derangement by snow than top contact.

=== 600 V DC, third rail (top contact) ===
- Glasgow Subway, electrified in 1935

=== 250 V DC, third rail (top contact) ===
- Hythe Pier Railway, electrified in 1922

=== 110 V DC, third rail (top contact) ===
- Volk's Electric Railway was originally electrified at 50 V DC, raised to 160 V in 1884 and reduced to 110 V DC during the 1980s.

=== 100 V DC, four rail ===
- The elevated "monorail" at the National Motor Museum, Beaulieu uses rubber tyres running on two metal tracks, one on either side of the central guide. Because it is rubber-tyred, it requires two current conductors and two collectors (hence the four-rail designation).

== Electrical Control ==
=== Mainline network ===
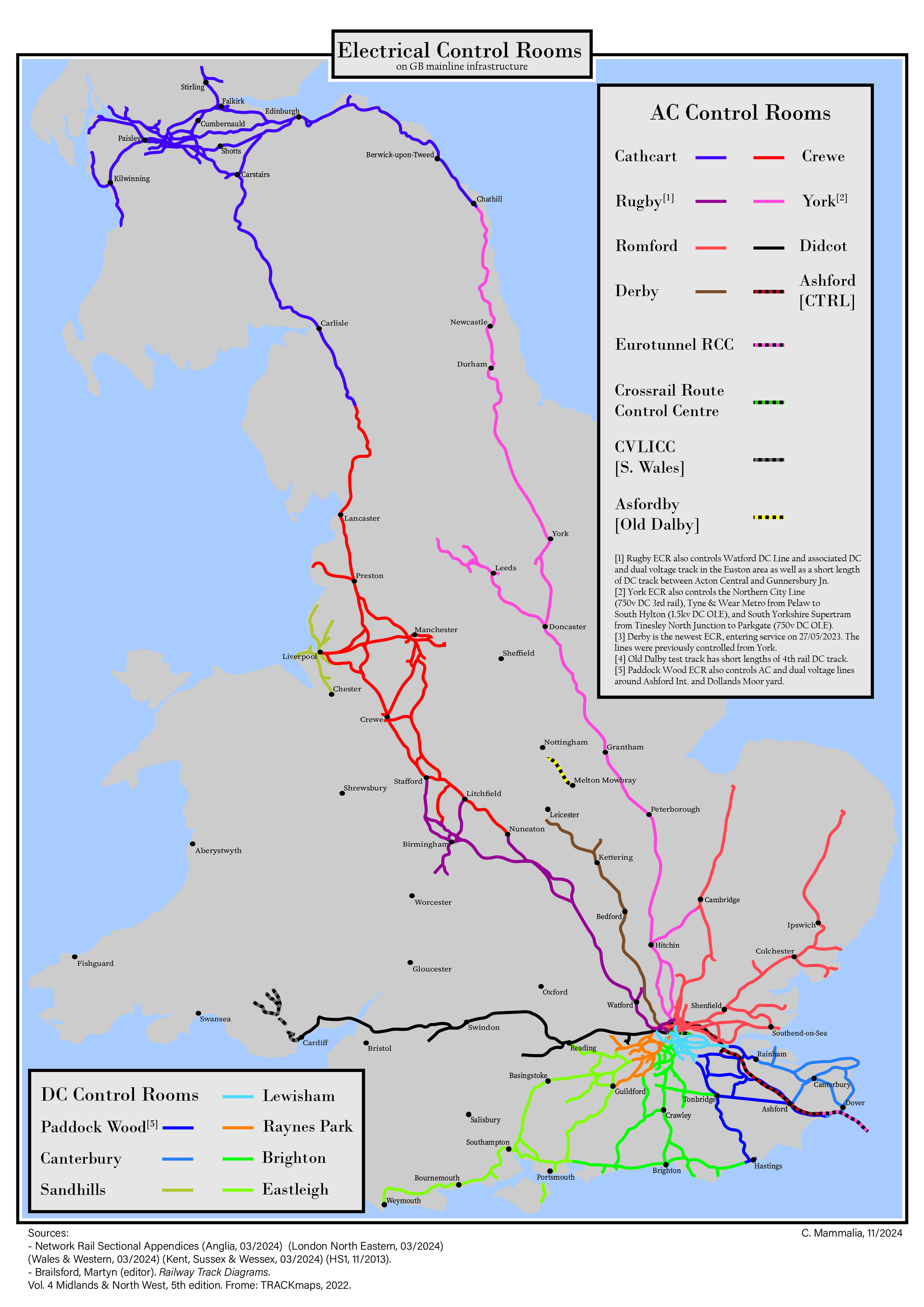
Electrified heavy rail lines in Great Britain, colour coded to their corresponding electrical control rooms (ECR)

All electrified railways require equipment and dedicated personnel to administer the supply of traction current and respond to fault conditions or emergency incidents. On the British railway network, electrified lines have traditionally been managed by discrete Electrical Control Rooms (ECRs) whose operations and jurisdictions run separately to signalling or route control. However, it is now intended that electrical control will be integrated into 8 of the 12 Rail Operating Centres (ROC) along with all signalling and train control in general.

In addition, the Crossrail and South Wales Metro projects have introduced new electrical control areas onto the heavy rail network which are part of those systems' respective control centres. The Crossrail Central Operating Section is operated from the Crossrail Route Control Centre (CRCC) while the South Wales Metro network is operated by the Core Valley Lines Integrated Control Centre (CVLICC). Unlike the normal mainline rail network, new systems with Route Control Centres tend to fully integrate signalling, traffic control and electrical control into the same workstation and are shared duties of the same staff members. So far, route/rail control centres have only presided over railway infrastructure that is not or no longer owned by Network Rail who own and manage the normal mainline network. For the South Wales Metro, that infrastructure is owned by Welsh government via Transport for Wales, and the Crossrail core is owned by TfL (Transport for London). The Channel Tunnel is run in a similar way with signalling, electrical control and all other functions united into a single operating floor at the Eurotunnel Railway Control Centre (RCC) which, for redundancy and resilience, has duplicate facilities at either side of the Channel.

This is in contrast to Network Rail's infrastructure which is still mostly operated by self contained ECRs. Even when ECRs have been integrated into ROCs, electrical control, signalling and traffic control are still separated into a different workspaces with different staff across the operating floor of the building.

The most recent closure of an ECR was in Autumn 2023 when Selhurst ECR ceased operation. Selhurst's duties had been progressively transferred into an expansion of Brighton ECR since 2021.

Including the legacy standalone ECRs (many of which are still operational to differing degrees); the new ECRs that have been commissioned as part of ROCs; smaller systems' RCCs; and HS1's control centre at Ashford, the mainline network's electrification is currently controlled at 19 locations.

ECR locations
System	Name	Status	Routes Controlled
25 kV AC OLE (50 Hz)	Romford ECR	Part of Romford ROC	Great Eastern Main Line, West Anglia Main Line, London Tilbury and Southend Line, Fen Line, Lea Valley Lines, Shenfield–Southend Line, Sunshine Coast Line, Crouch Valley Line, Braintree Branch Line, Mayflower Line, Romford–Upminster Line, Hertford East Branch, Chingford Branch, North London Line (from Stratford to Camden Road), Gospel Oak to Barking Line (from Barking to South Tottenham).
25 kV AC OLE (50 Hz)	York ECR^{1}	Part of York ROC	East Coast Main Line (from London Kings Cross to Chathill), Wakefield Line (from Doncaster to Leeds), Cambridge Line, Hertford Loop Line, Airedale Line, Wharfedale Line, Cross Country Route (from Church Fenton to Colton Junction): DC lines: Northern City Line (750 V DC third rail); Tyne & Wear Metro (1500 V DC OLE); Green Line (from Pelaw Metro Junction to South Hylton); South Yorkshire Supertram (750 V DC OLE); Tram Train line (from Tinsley North Junction to Parkgate)
25 kV AC OLE (50 Hz)	Derby ECR	Part of East Midlands Control Centre	Midland Main Line (from London St Pancras to Wigston South Junction), Oakham–Kettering Line (from Kettering to Corby)
25 kV AC OLE (50 Hz)	Didcot ECR	Part of Thames Valley ROC	Great Western Main Line (from London Paddington to Chippenham), South Wales Main Line (from Swindon to Cardiff Central), Heathrow Link Line, Reading–Taunton Line (from Reading to Newbury)
25 kV AC OLE (50 Hz)	Ashford ECR	Part of Ashford Control Centre (AFC)	High Speed 1
25 kV AC OLE (50 Hz)	Eurotunnel Rail Control Centre	One part of Eurotunnel RCC^{2}	Channel Tunnel (including Folkstone and Calais-Coquelles terminals)
25 kV AC OLE (50 Hz)	Crossrail Route Control Centre (CRCC)	One function of CRCC which is itself a separate department inside Romford ROC	Crossrail Central Operating Section
25 kV AC OLE (50 Hz)	Core Valley Lines Integrated Control Centre (CVLICC)	One function of the CVLICC located at the new depot in Taff's Well.	Cardiff City Line, Merthyr Line, Rhondda Line: Electrification under construction; Cardiff Bay Line, Coryton Line, Rhymney Line
25 kV AC OLE (50 Hz)	Crewe ECR	Legacy standalone ECR	West Coast Main Line (from Nuneaton to Stafford)(from Stafford to Preston via Wigan)(from Preston to Great Strickland), Colwich–Stone Line, Chase Line (from Walsall to Rugeley Trent Valley) Stafford–Manchester Line, Crewe–Manchester Line, Crewe–Liverpool Line, Crewe–Derby Line (from Crewe to Kidsgrove), Preston and Blackpool North Branch, Liverpool–Wigan Line, Chat Moss Line, Manchester–Preston Line, Styal Line, Buxton Line (from Manchester Piccadilly to Hazel Grove), Glossop Line, Huddersfield Line (from Stalybridge to Manchester Victoria and Manchester Piccadilly), Atherton Line (from Wigan Station Junction to Crow Nest Junction), Crow Nest Junction–Lostock Junction Branch.
25 kV AC OLE (50 Hz)	Rugby ECR^{1}	Legacy standalone ECR	West Coast Main Line (from London Euston to Nuneaton), Northampton Loop Line, Rugby–Birmingham–Stafford Line, Birmingham Cross City Line, Chase Line (from Birmingham New Street to Walsall both via Aston and via Soho East Junction), Walsall–Wolverhampton Line, St Albans Abbey Line, West London Line (from Willesden Junction to North Pole junction), Gospel Oak to Barking Line (South Tottenham to Gospel Oak), North London Line (from Camden Road to Acton Central), DC lines: North London Line; 750 V DC third rail (from Acton Central to Gunnersbury junction); Watford DC line: 750 V DC third rail from London Euston to Queen's Park; 750 V DC fourth rail from Queen's Park to Harrow & Wealdstone; 750 V DC third rail from Harrow & Wealdstone to Watford Junction.
25 kV AC OLE (50 Hz)	Cathcart ECR	Legacy standalone ECR	West Coast Main Line (from Great Strickland to Glasgow Central), East Coast Main Line (from Chathill to Edinburgh Waverley), Glasgow–Edinburgh via Falkirk Line, North Clyde Line, Glasgow–Edinburgh via Carstairs Line, Shotts Line, Glasgow–Dundee Line (from Glasgow Queen Street to Dunblane), Cumbernauld Line, Argyle Line, Ayrshire Coast Line, Cathcart Circle Line, Croy Line, Inverclyde Line, Motherwell–Cumbernauld, Paisley Canal Line, Glasgow South Western Line (from Glasgow Central to Barrhead and to East Kilbride), Whifflet Line, Edinburgh–Dunblane Line, North Berwick Line, Electrification under construction; Fife Circle Line (from Haymarket to Dalmeny, from Kinghorn to Ladybank, from Lochgelly to Thornton north junction)
25 kV AC OLE (50 Hz)	Asfordby ECR^{1}	Legacy standalone ECR	Old Dalby Test Track (includes some length of dual voltage and fourth rail DC track)
750 V DC top contact third rail	Lewisham ECR	Legacy standalone ECR	South Eastern Main Line (from Charing Cross/Cannon Street to Chelsfield), Brighton Main Line (from London Victoria to Clapham Junction; from London Bridge to Brockley), Chatham Main Line (from London Victoria to St Mary Cray either via Peckham Rye or via Kent House), Portsmouth Line (from Peckham Rye to East Dulwich), South London Line, East London Line, West London Line (from North Pole junction to Clapham Junction), Catford Loop Line, North Kent Line (from Lewisham to Gravesend), Dartford Loop Line, Bexleyheath Line, Mid-Kent Line, Greenwich Line, Holborn Viaduct–Herne Hill Line, Crystal Palace Line (from Birkbeck to Beckenham Junction), Bromley North Line, Greenwich Park Branch Line
750 V DC top contact third rail	Paddock Wood ECR^{3}	Legacy standalone ECR	South Eastern Main Line (from Chelsfield to Folkstone West), Chatham Main Line (from St Mary Cray to Rainham), North Kent Line (from Gravesend to Strood), Ashford–Ramsgate Line (from Ashford International to Wye), East Coastway Line (from Bexhill to Hastings), Hastings Line, Kent Downs Line, Medway Valley Line,
750 V DC top contact third rail	Canterbury ECR	Legacy standalone ECR	South Eastern Main Line (from Folkstone West to Dover Priory), Chatham Main Line (from Rainham to Ramsgate/Dover Priory), Ashford–Ramsgate Line (from Wye to Ramsgate), Kent Coast Line, Sheerness Line
750 V DC top contact third rail	Brighton ECR	Legacy standalone ECR	Brighton Main Line (from Clapham Junction to East Croydon; from Brockley to Brighton), Portsmouth Line (from East Dulwich to Ewell East; and from Leatherhead to Horsham), East Coastway Line (from Brighton to Bexhill), West Coastway Line (from Brighton to Emsworth), Arun Valley Line, Redhill–Tonbridge Line, Sutton Loop Line, Crystal Palace Line (from Balham to Birkbeck), Epson Downs Branch, Caterham Line, Oxted Line (from South Croydon to East Grinstead), Seaford Branch Line, Tattenham Corner Branch Line
750 V DC top contact third rail	Raynes Park ECR^{4}	Legacy standalone ECR	South West Main Line (London Waterloo to Hersham), Portsmouth Line (from Ewell East to Leatherhead), Waterloo–Reading Line (from London Waterloo to Egham), Staines–Windsor Line, Hounslow Loop Line, New Guildford Line, North London Line (750 V DC fourth rail - from Gunnersbury junction to Richmond), Chessington Branch Line, Kingston Loop Line, Hampton Court Branch Line, Shepperton Branch Line
750 V DC top contact third rail	Eastleigh ECR	Legacy standalone ECR	South West Main Line (from Hersham to Weymouth), Portsmouth Direct Line, Waterloo–Reading Line (from Egham to Reading), West Coastway Line (from Emsworth to Southampton Central), Eastleigh–Fareham Line, Alton Line, Ascot–Ash Vale Line, Chertsey Branch Line, Lymington Branch Line, North Downs Line (from Reading to Wokingham), Island Line
750 V DC top contact third rail	Sandhills ECR	Part of Sandhills IECC	Merseyrail Northern Line, Merseyrail Wirral Line
Notes	^{1: These AC ECRs also operate some DC electrification. 2: Eurotunnel RCC has two locations (Folkstone and Coquelles), both of which can take full control of Channel Tunnel systems.} ^{3: Paddock Wood ECR also controls AC and dual-voltage tracks in and around Ashford International and Dollands Moor yard while Ashford AFC controls the Up & Down CTRL lines that bypass those two locations. 4: For historical reasons, the Waterloo & City Line's electrification was controlled and supplied by Network Rail infrastructure even after TfL's acquisition of the line in 1994. This remained until around 2015 when a renewal of the line's electrification integrated the system with the rest of the London Underground network.}		

=== Decommissioned ECR's ===
The following is a list of electrical control rooms that used to exist but have now been decommissioned and their control areas transferred organised by present-day Network Rail Region and "Route" Areas.

==== Eastern Region ====
Anglia

- Chadwell Heath
  - Controlled the original 1.5 kV DC electrification between Liverpool Street/Fenchurch Street to Shenfield in 1949. It also controlled the extensions of that system from Shenfield to Chelmsford and Southend Victoria in 1956. It closed in 1960 when the lines were converted to 6.25 kV AC with control passing to a new ECR at Romford.
- Pitsea
  - Mentioned as part of the LT&S electrification in 1962.
- Colchester North
  - Briefly existed to control the electrification of the line between Colchester and Clacton-on-Sea/Walton-on-the-Naze. Control was transferred to Romford in 1962 when electrification reached Colchester from Shenfield.

East Coast

- Hornsey
  - Great Northern
    - Originally opened in 1976 for "Great Northern" electrification from Kings Cross to Royston including the Hertford Loop and the DC system on the Northern City Line.
  - Midland Main Line
    - The "Bed-Pan" electrification scheme from St Pancras/Moorgate (on the Widened Lines) to Bedford became operational in 1983 with electrical control also falling under Hornsea ECR
  - East Cost Main Line
    - The main ECML electrification project began to wire the mainline north of Hitchin from 1986. These lines also came under the control of Hornsey ECR as far as North Muskham MPTSC (between Newark and Retford) with the rest of the line northwards controlled from Doncaster ECR.
  - Closure
    - Both Hornsey and Doncaster were closed in 2001 with both areas combined into the new York ECR (situated within York IECC). The Midland Mainline remained under York ECR until July 2023 when a new ECR opened at East Midlands Control Centre at Derby.
- Doncaster
  - Opened in 1988 as ECML electrification had reached Doncaster. It controlled the ECML from North Muskham as far as Chathill (where it bordered with Cathcart ECR) and Wakefield line from Doncaster to Leeds. It also controlled the Airedale and Wharfdale lines when they were electrified in 1995.
  - Along with Hornsey to the south, Doncaster ECR was subsumed by York ECR in 2001.

North & East

- Penistone (Manchester-Sheffield-Wath)
- Manors
  - Installed in 1949 to control the Tyneside Electrics 600 V DC third rail system until the de-electrification of that network in 1967. It apparently succeeded an earlier control room at Wallsend constructed in 1934.

North West and Central Region

==== North West & Central ====
WCML (South)

- Willesden
  - Originally installed in 1946 by the London Midland & Scottish Railway to control the 650 V DC fourth rail system of the former London & North Western Railway over the North London Line (from Broad Street) and Watford DC line.
  - In 1965 the control room was extended to cover the 25 kV AC overhead system of the West Coast Main Line electrification at a similar time to Rugby, Crewe and Cathcart ECRs.
  - Willesden controlled the WCML as far as Leighton Buzzards MPTSC.
  - By 1986, following the closure of Broad Street station, the remaining DC lines from Maiden Lane to North Woolwich became controlled by Romford ECR.
  - The ECR was closed in 2000 with all lines transferred to Rugby ECR.

North West

- Bank Hall
  - Controlled the Merseyrail system from 1978 until control passed to Sandhills IECC in 1994.
  - It was the first ECR to use a VDU based control interface rather than a mimic panel fitted with physical switches.

==== Wales & Western ====
Western

- Slough IECC
  - Slough IECC signalling centre included a singular ECR desk to control the electrification from Paddington to Heathrow Airport from 1998. Slough IECC closed in 2010 with the signalling areas being transferred to Thames Valley ROC at Didcot, however the electrical control was initially transferred to Romford ECR until 2015 when the electrical control room at Didcot ROC became operational for the rest of the first stages of Great Western electrification beyond West Drayton which opened in 2017.

==== Southern ====
Wessex

- Woking
  - Built in 1936 and closed in 1997 with control passing to Eastleigh. The operating floor and mimic panel have been preserved and are let by Network Rail as a filming location.
- Ryde
  - Built for Island Line electrification until control passed to Eastleigh at an unknown point.

Sussex

- Three Bridges
  - Built in 1932 as part of the Brighton Main Line electrification. It was the first true electrical control room in Britain with previous electrification being controlled by staff at each individual substation and supervised by telephone link with a line controller.
- Ore
- Havant (South Coast)
- Selhurst
  - Built by British Railways in the 1950s at a similar time to Raynes Park and Lewisham. It closed progressively from 2021 to 2024 with control passing to Brighton.

Kent

- Swanley

== Obsolete systems ==
Great Britain has used different electrification systems in the past. Many of these date from the early part of the 20th century, when traction electricity was in the experimental stage. This section describes each system, in order of decreasing voltage.

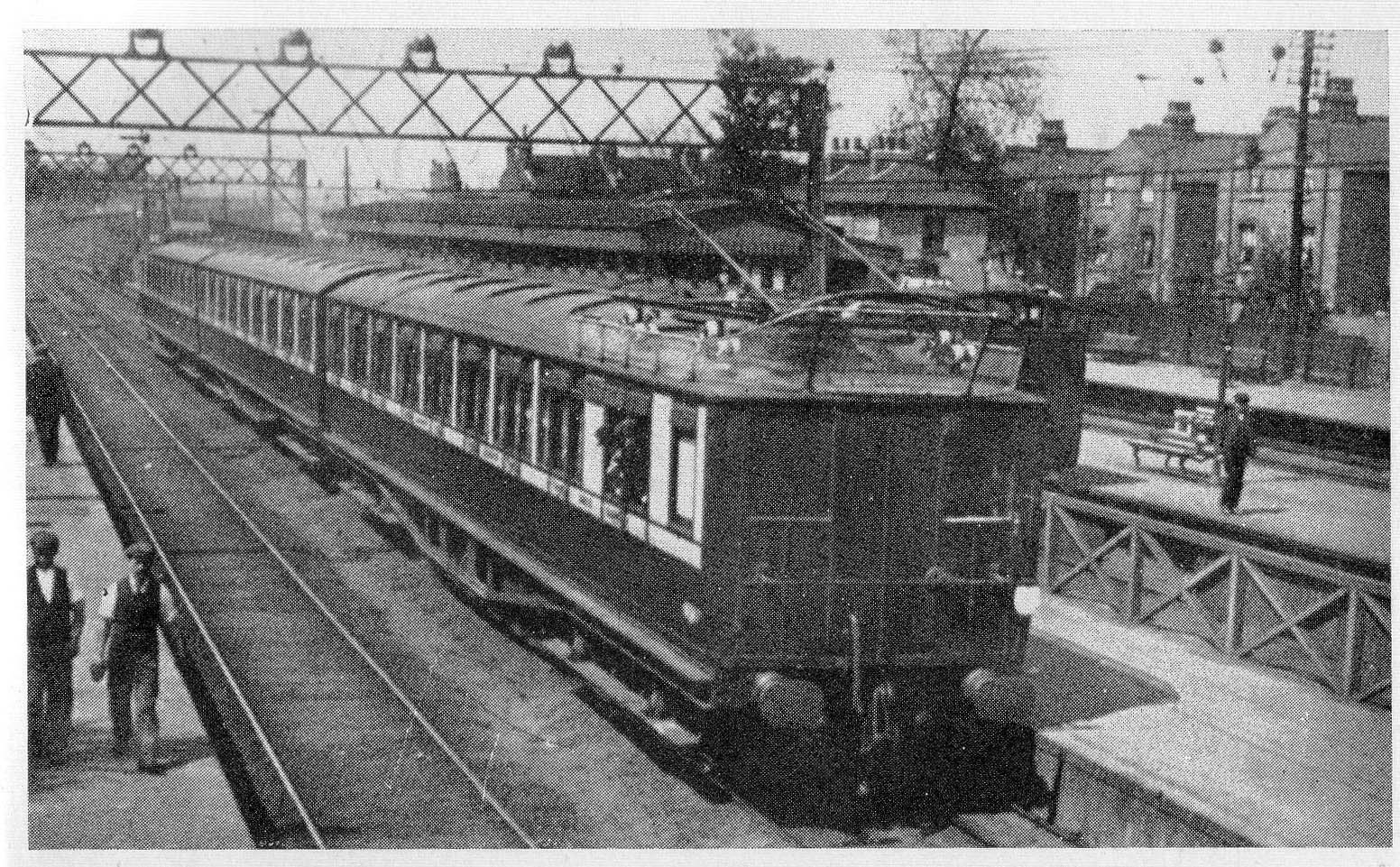
6,600 V LB&SCR 'Elevated Electric' train on the South London Line, about 1909

=== 6,600 V, 25 Hz AC, overhead ===
- Lancaster to Heysham via Morecambe: Used for an early trial of electrification; opened between 13 April and 14 September 1908. In 1953, it was converted to 50 Hz, and operated until 1966.
- 'Elevated Electric' London suburban lines of the London, Brighton and South Coast Railway (LBSCR): The first large-scale suburban electrification scheme; starting with the South London Line and then extended to other commuter lines around the south of London, operational from 1 December 1909. Following the grouping into the LBSCR into the Southern Railway in 1922, all of the 6,600 V lines were converted to the 650 V DC third rail system by September 1929.

=== 6,250 V 50 Hz AC, overhead ===
During the initial electrification of parts of the network to 25 kV 50 Hz AC overhead, the initial solution to the limited clearance problems in suburban areas (due to numerous tunnels and bridges) in London and Glasgow was to use the lower voltage of 6.25 kV. Later technological improvements in insulation allowed these areas to be converted to 25 kV. The last sections of 6.25 kV were converted during the 1980s.

- London, Tilbury and Southend Lines – The 6.25 kV section was from Fenchurch Street to beyond Barking, with changeovers there on both the Upminster and Tilbury lines. The section between Chalkwell and Shoeburyness was also at 6.25 kV. The remainder was at 25 kV. The sections electrified at 6.25 kV were converted to 25 kV during the early 1980s.
- Great Eastern Lines: – The line from Liverpool Street to Southend Victoria was originally electrified at 1,500 V DC overhead during the 1940s-50s. During the early 1960s, the whole of this line was converted to 6.25 kV AC overhead, while the main line east of Shenfield was progressively electrified at 25 kV, with changeover east of Shenfield. During the early 1980s, the line was again converted, this time to 25 kV.

The Cambridge line and branches from Liverpool Street was electrified in the early 1960s, with 6.25 kV out to a changeover at Cheshunt, and 25 kV beyond. The Chingford and Enfield lines were thus at 6.25 kV throughout. This route was again fully converted to 25 kV in the early 1980s.

As part of the electrification onwards to Cambridge and Norwich in the 1980s, electric locomotives were transferred to these routes from the West Coast route. These locomotives would not have been able to operate at 6.25 kV.

Glasgow Suburban network

On the North Clyde, the central section between Parkhead and before Dalmuir (Clydebank loop) and Westerton (Anniesland loop) were at 6.25 kV, with the outer sections at 25 kV. The Bridgeton and Springburn branches were thus at 6.25 kV throughout. The sections electrified at 6.25 kV were converted to 25 kV during the early 1980s.

On the South Clyde, the route from Glasgow Central around the Cathcart Loop was initially at 6.25 kV, with changeovers to 25 kV at Kings Park and Muirend on the Motherwell and Neilston routes. These lines were progressively converted to 25 kV in the 1970s and 1980s.

=== 3,500 V DC, overhead ===
Bury to Holcombe Brook – This was electrified by the Lancashire and Yorkshire Railway in 1913 as part of a trial system for export. The system was converted to third rail in 1918 (see below).

=== 1,500 V DC, overhead (historic) ===
After World War I, the UK Government set up a committee to investigate the various systems of railway electrification; in 1921, it recommended that 1,500 V DC overhead should be the future national standard. Several schemes were implemented in its wake, but the Great Depression and World War II meant that very little work was done. Technological advances after 1945 meant that the 25 kV AC system was adopted instead for the West Coast Main Line and Glasgow suburban electrification (as set out in the BR 1955 Modernisation Plan). However, at the same time, large amounts of money had been (and were still being) spent converting several lines to 1,500 V DC.

Manchester, South Junction and Altrincham Railway – A joint LMS and LNER scheme, it opened on 11 May 1931. The success of this scheme influenced LNER's later electrification schemes. The line was converted to 25 kV AC in 1971, but the stretch between Altrincham and Trafford Bar (plus the stretch between Trafford Bar and the Cornbrook viaduct) were later incorporated into Manchester Metrolink and converted again (this time to 750 V DC).

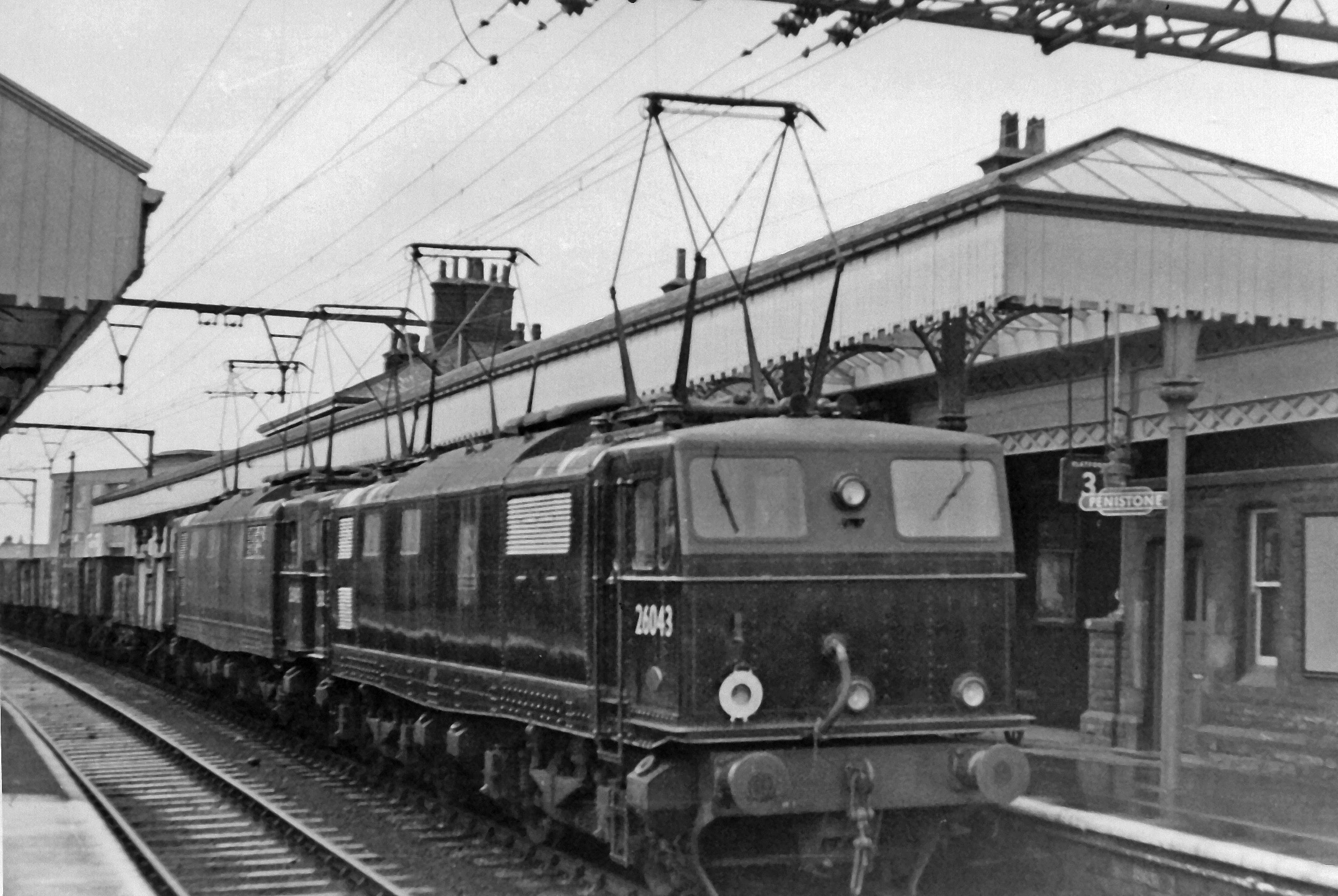
EM1 (Class 76), 1,500 V DC electric locomotives on the Woodhead Route in 1954

Manchester–Sheffield–Wath – Known as the Woodhead Route, the LNER chose this hilly (and busy) main line for its first mainline electrification, with work beginning in 1936. Due to the Depression and World War II, it was not completed until the 1950s. After completion, the government chose to standardise on 25 kV AC instead, leaving the Woodhead Route and the few other 1,500 V DC lines isolated and non-standard. The passenger locomotives were sold in 1969 and saw further service in the Netherlands. In a subsequent rationalisation, BR closed much of this route east of Hadfield in 1981 in favour of the more southerly Hope Valley Line, which serves more local communities. A section of the line between Manchester, Glossop and Hadfield remained open as part of the Manchester suburban network, and was operated by Class 506 EMU's, until it was converted to 25 kV AC in December 1984.

Shenfield Metro – The LNER decided to electrify the Liverpool Street to Shenfield section of the Great Eastern Main Line (GEML), known as the Shenfield Metro. Civil engineering works began during the 1930s, but World War II intervened. Work was completed in 1949 and extended to Chelmsford and Southend Victoria in 1956, using Class 306 (AM6) EMUs. It was converted on 4–6 November 1960, in the wake of the BR 1955 Modernisation Plan, to the new standard of 25 kV AC (initially with some sections at 6.25 kV). The rest of the GEML was subsequently electrified.

Shildon to Newport – This line ran from Shildon (County Durham) to Newport (near Middlesbrough). The route was initially over the 1825 Stockton-to-Darlington line, then via Simpasture Junction (the former Clarence railway) through Carlton, Carlton Junction to Carlton South Junction, Bowesfield West Junction to Bowesfield Junction, through Thornaby and ending at Erimus Yard (Newport East). In the wake of the electrification of Tyneside by the NER, this coal-carrying line was electrified between 1 July 1915 and 1 January 1916 as a planned precursor to electrifying NER's busy York to Newcastle main line (part of the East Coast Main Line). The LNER removed this electrification system in 1935 (between 7 January and 8 July); the decline in the coal market making it economically unfeasible to undertake the significant renewals required to continue electric operation. The locomotives were stored for other electrified routes.

=== 1,200 V DC, third rail (side-contact) ===
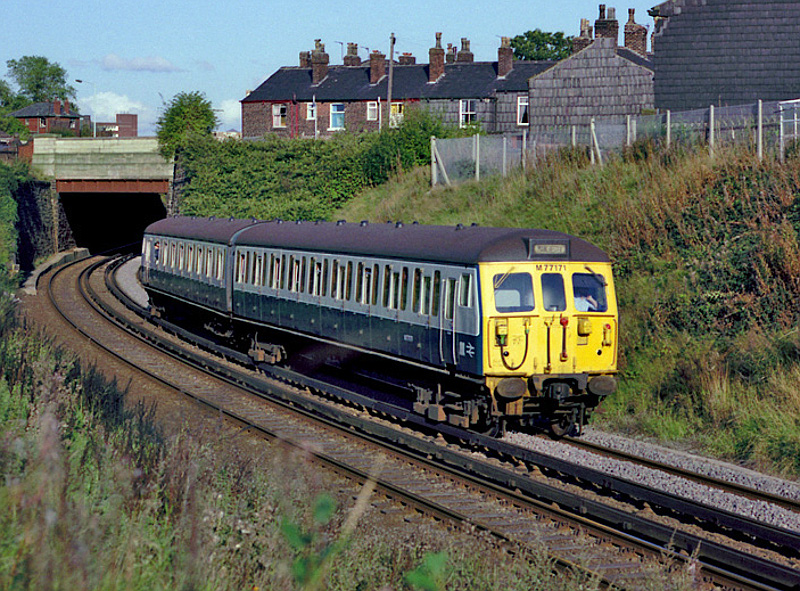
A Class 504 (1,200 V DC) train near Bury in 1982

Manchester Victoria - Bury – In 1916, the Lancashire and Yorkshire Railway (L&YR) electrified the Bury Line between Manchester Victoria and Bury Bolton Street (later switched to Bury Interchange) using 1,200 V DC third rail (side contact). The line between Bury and Holcombe Brook which had been electrified using 3,500 V DC overhead in 1913 was converted to this system in 1918. As the electrification scheme was a success, the L&YR drew up plans to electrify the Oldham Loop Line with the same system in the early 1920s. These plans were abandoned when the L&YR became part of the London and North Western Railway in 1922. The system survived until it was abandoned in 1991, when the line was converted to a 750 V DC overhead line system and became part of the Manchester Metrolink.

=== 650 V DC, overhead ===
- Swansea and Mumbles Railway

=== 600 V DC, third rail ===
Tyneside Electrics – This was electrified in 1904, in response to extensive competition from new electric trams. The concept was a success for the North Eastern Railway (NER), a noted pioneer in electrification, as passenger numbers returned to pre-tram levels. As the stock reached life expectancy in 1937, the network was remodelled by London and North Eastern Railway (LNER) to reflect the changing industrial and residential makeup of the area. Electrified, at the same time, was the dockside branch, where a pair of Class ES1 (formerly NER No.1 and 2) locomotives were introduced in 1905. These British Thomson-Houston locomotives operated from both the third rail and overhead line. British Rail removed the electrification between 1963 and 1967, citing the changing industrial and population makeup of the area which reduced the need for electric traction. Much of the Tyneside network was later re-electrified, (using 1500 V DC overhead), as the Tyne and Wear Metro.

=== 525 V DC, third rail ===
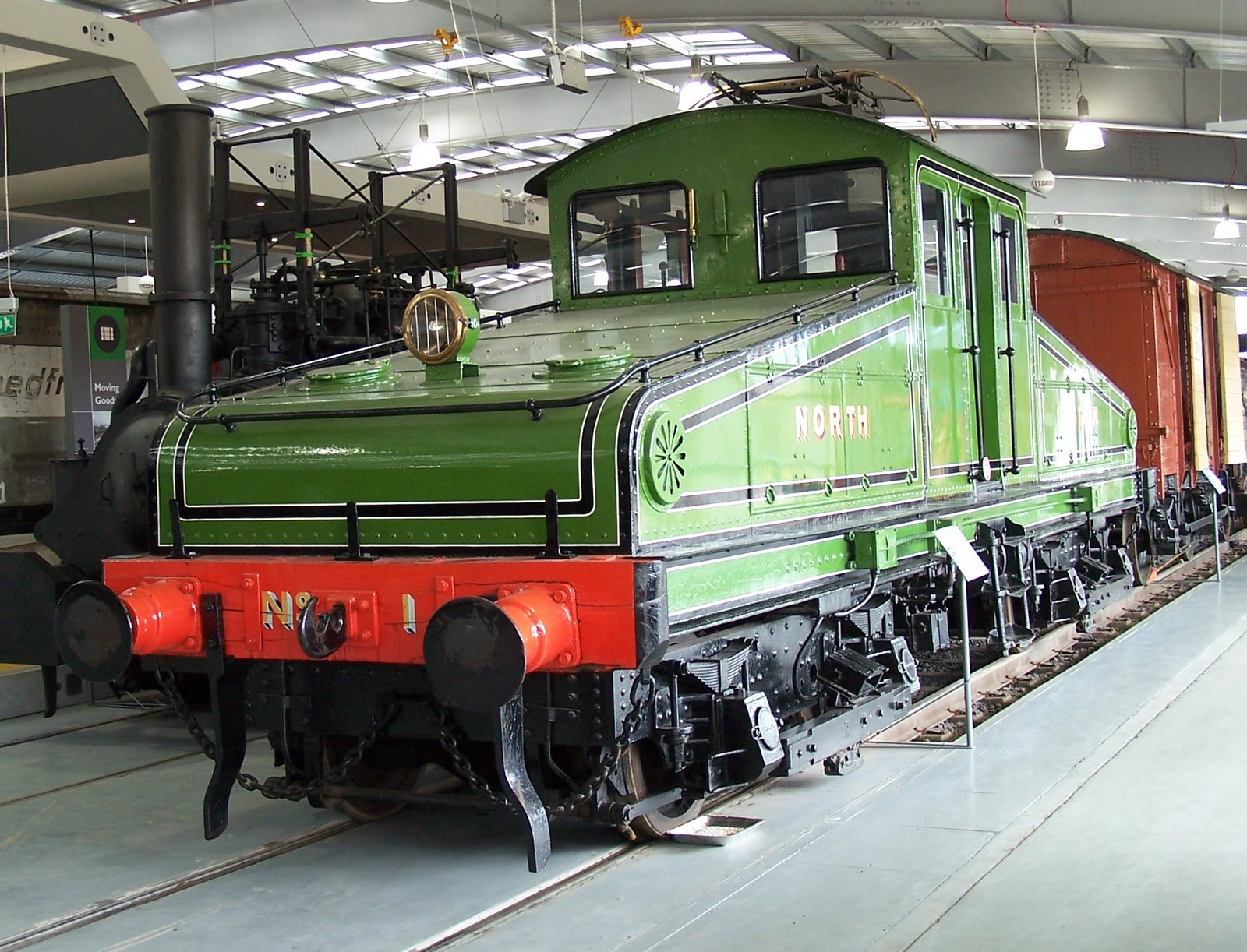
NER No. 1 (Locomotion museum, Shildon)

Liverpool Overhead Railway – The Liverpool Overhead Railway was one of the earliest electric railways in Great Britain. The first section, between Alexandra Dock and Herculaneum Dock, was opened in 1893. The line connected with Lancashire and Yorkshire Railway's North Mersey Branch. It was never nationalised, and closed on 30 December 1956 due to extensive corrosion throughout its iron infrastructure (which was deemed uneconomical to replace).

=== 500 V DC, overhead ===
- Grimsby and Immingham Electric Railway

=== 500 V DC, third rail ===
City and South London Railway – The City and South London Railway electrification was unusual (compared with later schemes) in that it used a three-wire DC system. This meant that, although the offset centre third rail was electrified at +500 volts in the northbound tunnel, it was electrified at -500 volts in the southbound tunnel. The motors on the locomotives and the incandescent electric lamps in the carriages worked, regardless of the polarity of the supply. The three-wire system was adopted because the initial system was fed directly from the dynamos in the surface power plant at the Stockwell end of the line. It was important to minimise the voltage drop as much as possible, bearing in mind the rather steep gradient on the approach to King William Street Station.

=== 440 V DC, third rail ===
London Post Office Railway – Underground railway under London operated by the Post Office. Operated between 1927 and closure in 2003. Partially re-opened as a tourist attraction in 2017.

== See also ==
- British electric multiple units
- Campaign to Electrify Britain's Railways
- History of rail transport in Great Britain
- List of British electric locomotives
