= SR Class 2-WIM =

Southern Railway 2-WIM
- In service: 1929–1954
- Built at: Peckham Rye Works
- Constructed: 1929
- Number built: 4
- Number scrapped: 4
- Fleet numbers: 1909–1912, later 1809–1812
- Capacity: 16 first class, 91 third class
- Operators: Southern Railway, British Railways
- Line served: Wimbledon to West Croydon

Specifications
- Train length: 127 ft 4 in (38.81 m)
- Width: 9 ft 3 in (2.82 m)
- Electric systems: 750 V DC third rail
- Current collection: Contact shoe
- UIC classification: Bo′2′+2′2′
- Braking system: Automatic air
- Coupling system: Screw-link
- Multiple working: Standard SR system
- Track gauge: 4 ft 8 1/2 in (1,435 mm)

2-WIM was the designation given, by Southern Railway (SR), to a 4-strong fleet of electric multiple units, dedicated for use on the ex-LBSCR West Croydon to Wimbledon Line, using the headcode 2. None of these units survived long enough in British Rail ownership to be allocated a TOPS class.

== Construction ==
The 2-WIM (2-car Wimbledon stock, numbers 1809–1812) units were rebuilt in 1929, from former Trailer First cars, originally used in ex-LBSCR AC electric SL stock. They were intended for use on the line between Wimbledon and Croydon. Originally these units had some First Class accommodation in the Driving Motor car, but this was later declassified to Third Class only. The units were numbered 1909–1912 before 1936, when those numbers were reused for new 2-BIL units.

== Formations ==
Initial formations of these units were as follows:

Unit Numbers	DMBT	DTC
1909–1912 / 1809–1812	9818–9821	9951–9954

== Withdrawal ==
All four units were withdrawn in 1954, and subsequently scrapped.
