= SR Class 2-SL =

Southern Railway 2-SL
- In service: 1929–1954
- Built at: Peckham Rye Works
- Replaced: South London Line stock
- Constructed: 1929
- Entered service: May 1929
- Number built: 8
- Number scrapped: 8
- Formation: DMBT+DTC
- Fleet numbers: 1901–1908, later 1801–1808
- Capacity: 16 first class, 108 third class
- Operators: Southern Railway, British Railways

Specifications
- Train length: 127 ft 2 in (38.76 m)
- Width: 9 ft 6 in (2.90 m)
- Traction system: Metropolitan-Vickers
- Power output: 550 hp (410.13 kW)
- UIC classification: Bo′2′+2′2′
- Braking system(s): Automatic air
- Coupling system: Screw-link
- Multiple working: Standard SR system
- Track gauge: 4 ft 8 1/2 in (1,435 mm)

The Southern Railway (SR) gave the designation 2-SL to the small fleet of electric multiple units dedicated for use on the South London lines. None of these units survived long enough in British Rail ownership to be allocated a TOPS class. In Southern Railway/Region days, they mainly spent their lives as 2-car units on the ex-LBSCR Wimbledon-West Croydon Line (now Croydon Tramway) with head code 2. They were distinctive, because they retained their flat roofs over the driving cabs, where the pantographs were originally situated.

== Construction ==
The 2-SL (2-car South London stock, numbers 1801–1808) units were rebuilt in 1929 from the Driving Motor cars originally used in ex-LBSCR AC electric SL stock. They were intended for use on the South London lines. Originally, these units had some First Class accommodation in the Driving Trailer car, but this was later declassified to Third Class only. The units were numbered 1901–1908 before 1936, when those numbers were reused for new 2-BIL units. At the same time, 4-SUB unit number 1801 was renumbered 1600.

== Formations ==
Initial formations of these units were as follows:

Unit Numbers	DMBT	DTC
1901–1908 / 1801–1808	8723–8730	9751–9758

== Withdrawal ==
The majority of these units were withdrawn in 1954, the exceptions being 1802 (in 1951) and 1807 (destroyed in 1940 during a World War II air raid). All were subsequently scrapped.
