= SR Class SL =

LB&SCR South London stock
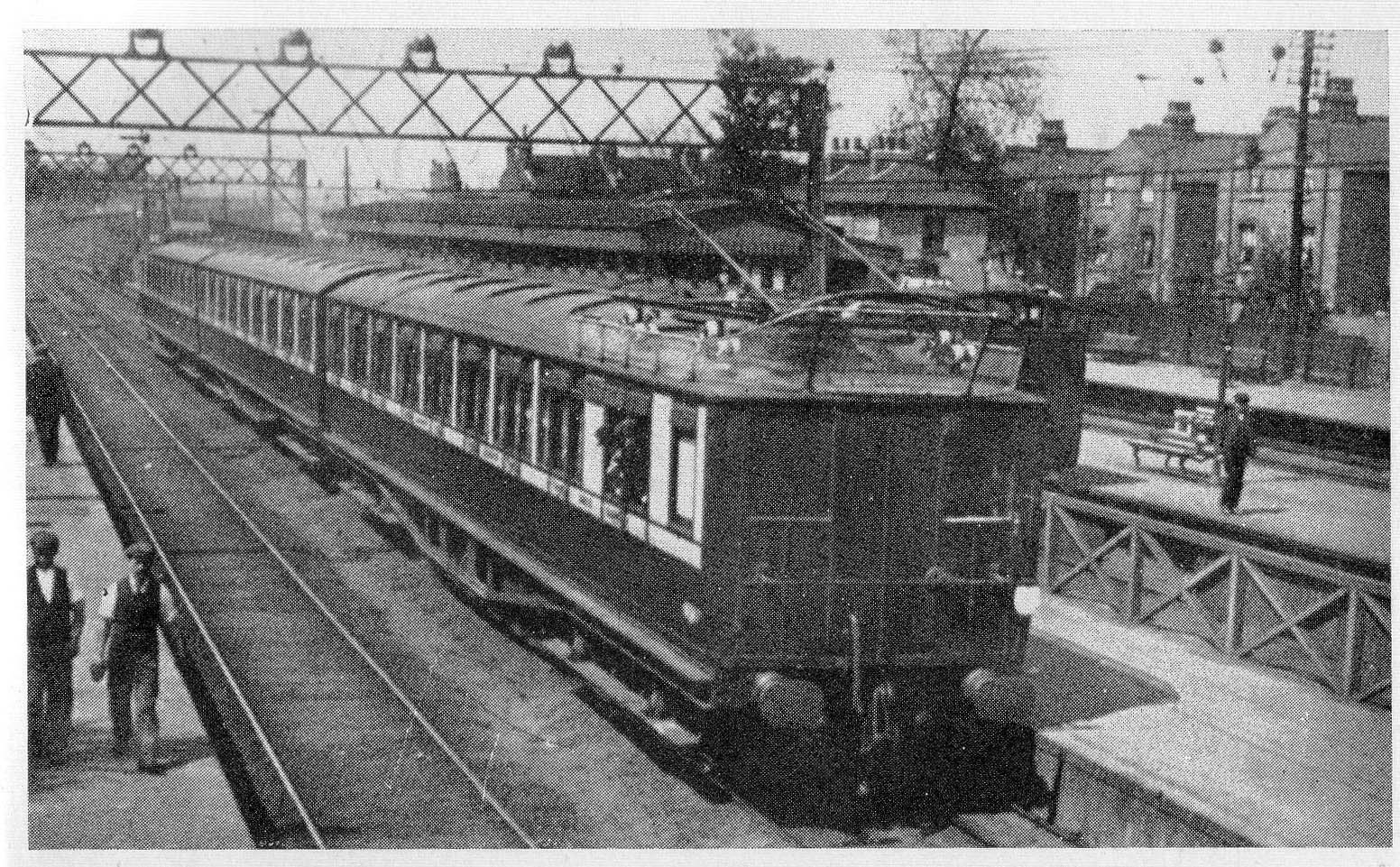
- SL stock at Wandsworth Road station, about 1909
- In service: 1909 - 1928
- Manufacturer: Metropolitan Amalgamated Carriage & Wagon Co. Ltd
- Refurbished: Rebuilt as DC units 1928/9
- Number built: Eight 3-car sets later rebuilt as 16 2-car sets
- Formation: 3 cars sets: DMBT-TF-DMBT later 2 car sets: DMBT-DTC
- Capacity: 3-sets: 74 First, 144 Third
- Operators: London, Brighton and South Coast Railway, Southern Railway

Specifications
- Car length: 63 ft 7 in (19.38 m)
- Width: 9 ft 3 in (2.82 m)
- Weight: DMBT: 54 long tons (54.9 t; 60.5 short tons); TF: 30 long tons (30.5 t; 33.6 short tons); DTC: 20.40 long tons (20.7 t; 22.8 short tons)
- Power output: 3-sets: 920 hp (686 kW); 2-sets: 460 hp (343 kW)
- Transmission: Four Winter Eichberg traction motors of 115 hp (86 kW) each.
- Electric system: 6.7 kV AC overhead lines
- Current collection: Bow collector
- Track gauge: 4 ft 8 1/2 in (1,435 mm) standard gauge

The Southern Railway (SR) in the UK gave the designation SL to the fleet of AC overhead electric multiple units used on the South London Line between Victoria and London Bridge station. These had been built by the London, Brighton and South Coast Railway in 1909, but with the abandonment of the Elevated Electric service in 1928 they were converted to DC third rail units.

== Construction ==
The SL (South London stock) units were built in 1909 for use on the LBSCR AC overhead electrified lines in South London. This stock comprised eight three-car units, originally formed Driving Motor Brake Third + Trailer First + Driving Motor Brake Third. They were built by the Metropolitan Amalgamated Carriage & Wagon Company at Birmingham and each motor coach had four 115 horsepower (86 kW) Winter Eichberg motors.

The Trailer First cars were later removed and used as locomotive-hauled stock, from when the driving cars were paired with former loco-hauled coaches converted to Driving Trailer Composite cars.

After the replacement of the AC overhead equipment by the standard SR 660 V DC third-rail system on 17 June 1928, these units were rebuilt. The Driving Motor cars were paired together again to form eight units designated 2SL. The Trailer First cars (which had been out of EMU stock for nearly twenty years) were included in this programme, and were rebuilt into Driving Motor and Driving Trailer pairs to form four units designated 2Wim, for use on the Wimbledon-West Croydon line.

== Formations ==
The LB&SCR purchased sufficient cars for 8 permanent sets, numbered 1E to 8E. However, later Brighton practice was to dispense with fixed sets.

Type	LB&SCR No.	SR No.
DMBT	3201/03/04/06/07/09/10/12/13/15/16/18/19/21/22/24	8601–8616
TF	3202/05/08/11/14/17/20/23	7644–7651
DTC	3225–3230, 4057–4060, 4065–4068	9811–9824

When the units were reformed into 2-car sets, 14 driving trailers were provided for 16 driving motor cars, because it was found that the motor cars required more time under maintenance.
