= Rail Infrastructure projects in the United Kingdom =

Rail Infrastructure projects in the United Kingdom are needed because much of the United Kingdom railway infrastructure is of Victorian origin. Electrification is infrastructure but usually accompanied by other modernising such as level crossing removal, new signaling, bridge and tunnel modifications and embankment and cutting works to improve drainage. Various schemes to modernise the UK railway have been completed and also some are ongoing. Some of these include:

== Essentially complete ==
- Great Western Main Line upgrade
- Airdrie–Bathgate rail link
- Crossrail
- Northern Hub
- Thameslink Programme
- West Coast Main Line route modernisation
- Gospel Oak to Barking line

== In progress ==
- Transpennine Route Upgrade
- Felixstowe to Nuneaton railway upgrade
- Midland Main Line upgrade
- Railway electrification in Scotland
- North West England electrification schemes
- High Speed 2
- South Wales Metro

== Once proposed but now essentially abandoned ==
- Electric Spine
- Integrated Rail Plan
- Traction Decarbonisation Network Strategy
