= CEBR =

CEBR may refer to

- Centre for Economics and Business Research
- Campaign to Electrify Britain's Railway
