= Felixstowe to Nuneaton railway upgrade =

Rail upgrade project in the UK

The Felixstowe to Nuneaton railway upgrade in the United Kingdom is a series of upgrades being made to both a key strategic freight route and one that carries passengers on many parts. It is one of only two routes between the busiest container port and the Midlands, the other being via London. The route and the upgrade is sometimes abbreviated to F2N (and also F2MN for Midlands and the North). The railway route includes the Birmingham–Peterborough line for a large part. The line links the Port of Felixstowe in Felixstowe, Suffolk, with the Midlands and crosses the East Coast Main Line, the Midland Main Line and the West Coast Main Line and thus the north and Scotland. From Nuneaton, a number of intermodal terminals may be reached. Much infrastructure in the UK is of Victorian origin and thus needed an upgrade; F2N, being a key route, is no exception.

== Background ==
Felixstowe is the UK's busiest container port which handles in the region of 40 to 50% of Britain's container traffic trade. In 2017, it was ranked at 43rd-busiest container port in the world and 8th in Europe, with an estimated traffic of 3.85 million twenty-foot equivalent units (TEU). Felixstowe port continues to break freight records. In East Anglia the main road from the port is the A14 but this cannot handle all lorry traffic that is required, hence the railway is a vital strategic artery. As of 2026 all the trains are diesel hauled for a substantial part of their journey. In addition, rail freight in general has seen good growth since the lows of the mid-1990s. It was described in 2023 as the most intensely used intermodal freight corridor in the UK. All these factors have meant that capacity and other enhancements have been discussed for many years.

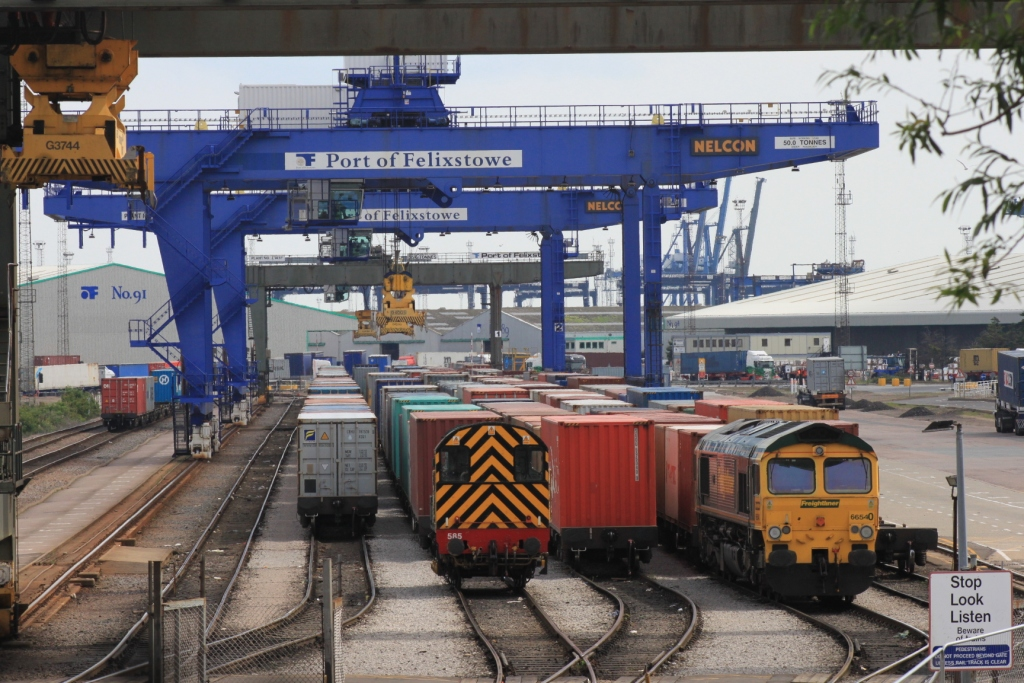
Felixstowe Port North Terminal with Freightliner Class 08 and Class 66 locomotives

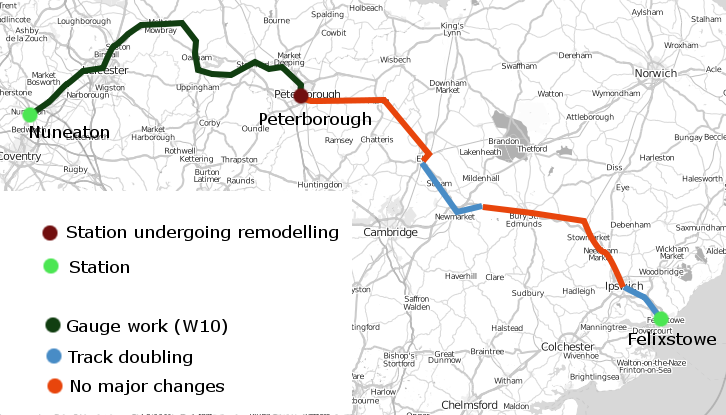
Route for Felixstowe to Nuneaton freight capacity scheme

== 21st-century developments and constituent projects ==
In response to the trend for intermodal container heights to increase from 8 feet 6 inches to the "high cube" standard of 9 feet 6 inches, the Strategic Rail Authority (SRA) funded gauge clearance work, completed in November 2004, to allow 9-foot-6-inch-high (2.9 m) containers to be carried on standard freight wagons on the F2N route and beyond. The work involved lowering track and reconstruction of bridges along the route. The SRA intended to go on to clear the route to W12 gauge to accommodate wider containers on European intermodal units, and to work to increase capacity to 30–40 trains per day in each direction by 2010 to cater for the expected growth in traffic.

In 2009 Network Rail published the document 'Network RUS Electrification 2009' which attempted to assign priorities and benefit-cost-ratios for electrification schemes in the United Kingdom. The document had a number of maps and outlined core schemes, including F2N components. The document—although having a map showing F2N as one scheme in Table 6.2, section 5.1—treated it as a composite of three individual components. However, the three combined schemes were assigned very high priority against a number of factors. A change of government occurred and the document was not taken forward to implementation. However, the 2009 RUS government document was refreshed in January 2015. A large portion of the document discussed F2N at length.

It was claimed in 2010 that the upgrade would take 750,000 heavy trucks off the roads by 2030.

In September 2012, approval was given to construct a small new section of double track line just north of Ipswich (1.451 kilometres) called the Bacon Factory curve, which would remove the need to reverse freight trains in Ipswich yard. Groundwork started in October 2012. In June 2013 a new rail freight terminal was opened in Felixstowe to provide a doubling of capacity.

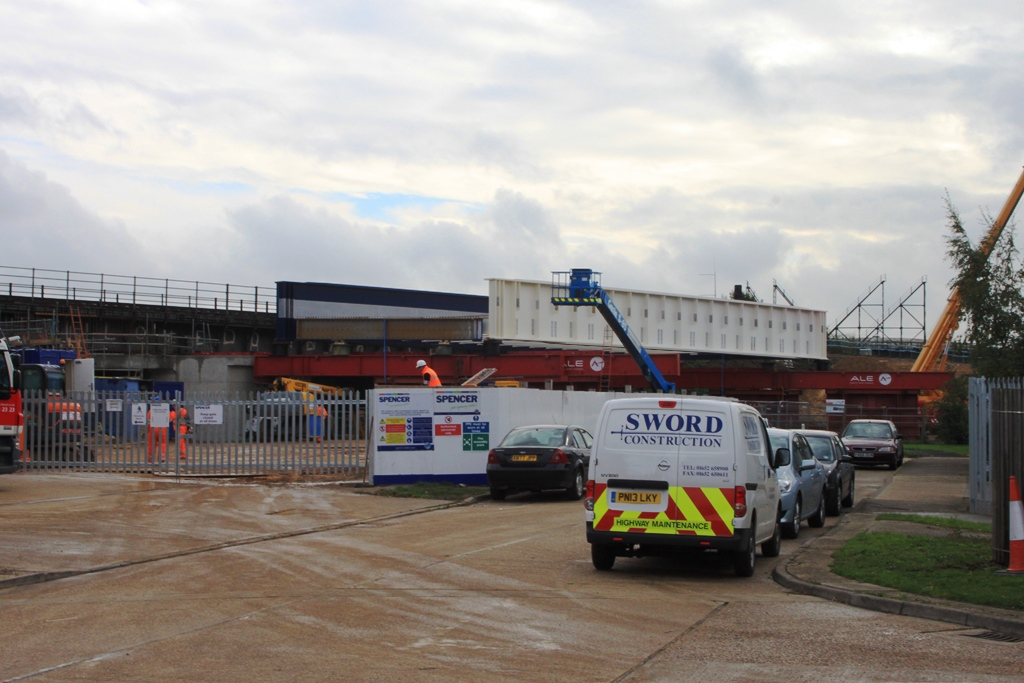
Bacon Factory Curve construction: new bridge at Boss Hall

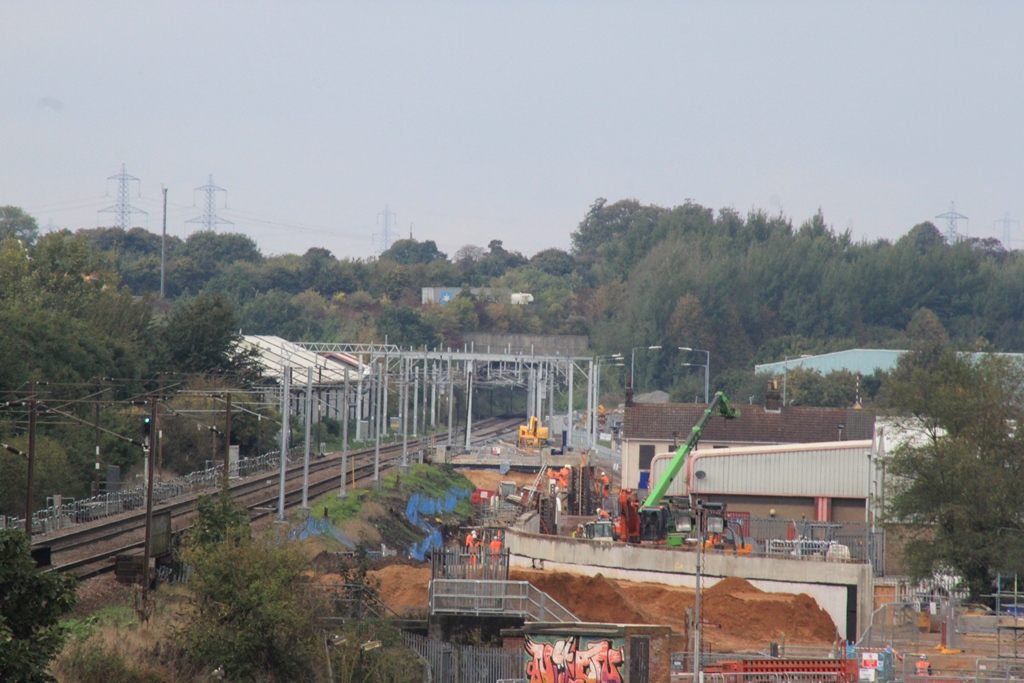
Bacon Factory Curve construction, looking towards Europa Junction

Upgrade of the section between Ely and Soham was proposed but was declined in September 2015 because costs had increased due to the complexity of the project. The costing cited was £35 million. When asked in parliament via written question on 3 October 2019 what was planned for the F2N corridor, Chris Heaton-Harris the Rail Minister answered that a number of individual enhancement schemes for the route were being looked at in the 2019 to 2024 timeframe. Among these were Syston Junction to Trent Junction enhancements, Haughley Junction redoubling and Ely capacity enhancement. He confirmed the strategic importance of the route. The section of line between Peterborough and Ipswich is seen as particularly problematic. There are a large number of level crossings in particular that need upgrading or removal. Junctions and other areas need substantial modification including Haughley and Ely junctions. MPs and others have requested a refreshed business case for Ely in July 2026. Some double tracking in the Soham area would also be required. This would be for freight and also passenger aspirations.

Writing in Modern Railways in March 2018, Julian Worth, former EWS Marketing Director and Transrail Freight Managing Director, said upgrading and electrifying F2N would require 146 miles of electrification and enable 56 trains to convert to electric haulage. Similar points and strategy were pointed out at a Campaign to Electrify Britain's Railway seminar.

The Rail Freight Group gave an award in 2019 for expanding capacity on the route from 33 to 47 freight trains per day. The route was mentioned in a submission to the "Trains Fit for the Future" parliamentary enquiry in 2019/20. The Chartered Institute for Logistics and Transport although calling for 800 miles of electrification across the UK to make 95% of Railfreight electrically hauled, put the F2N route as number one priority.

== Nuneaton and the Golden Triangle of Logistics ==
The area around Nuneaton and the Midlands has been referred to as the "Golden Triangle of Logistics". Birmingham is the UK second-busiest city and the Lawley Street Freight Liner Terminal is key for rail freight, and has daily service to and from Felixstowe. Daventry Rail Freight Terminal is also key and has regular service to and from Felixstowe. Birch Coppice is also in the golden triangle, as is East Midlands Gateway. As part of the Golden Triangle, Hams Hall Rail Freight Terminal is one of the busiest intermodal terminals in the UK. Associated British Ports obtained the site in 2002. Hams Hall has three trains per day in each direction to and from Felixstowe. All these factors have meant that capacity in the Nuneaton area to the ports, including Felixstowe and other enhancements have been discussed and progressively implemented over the years.

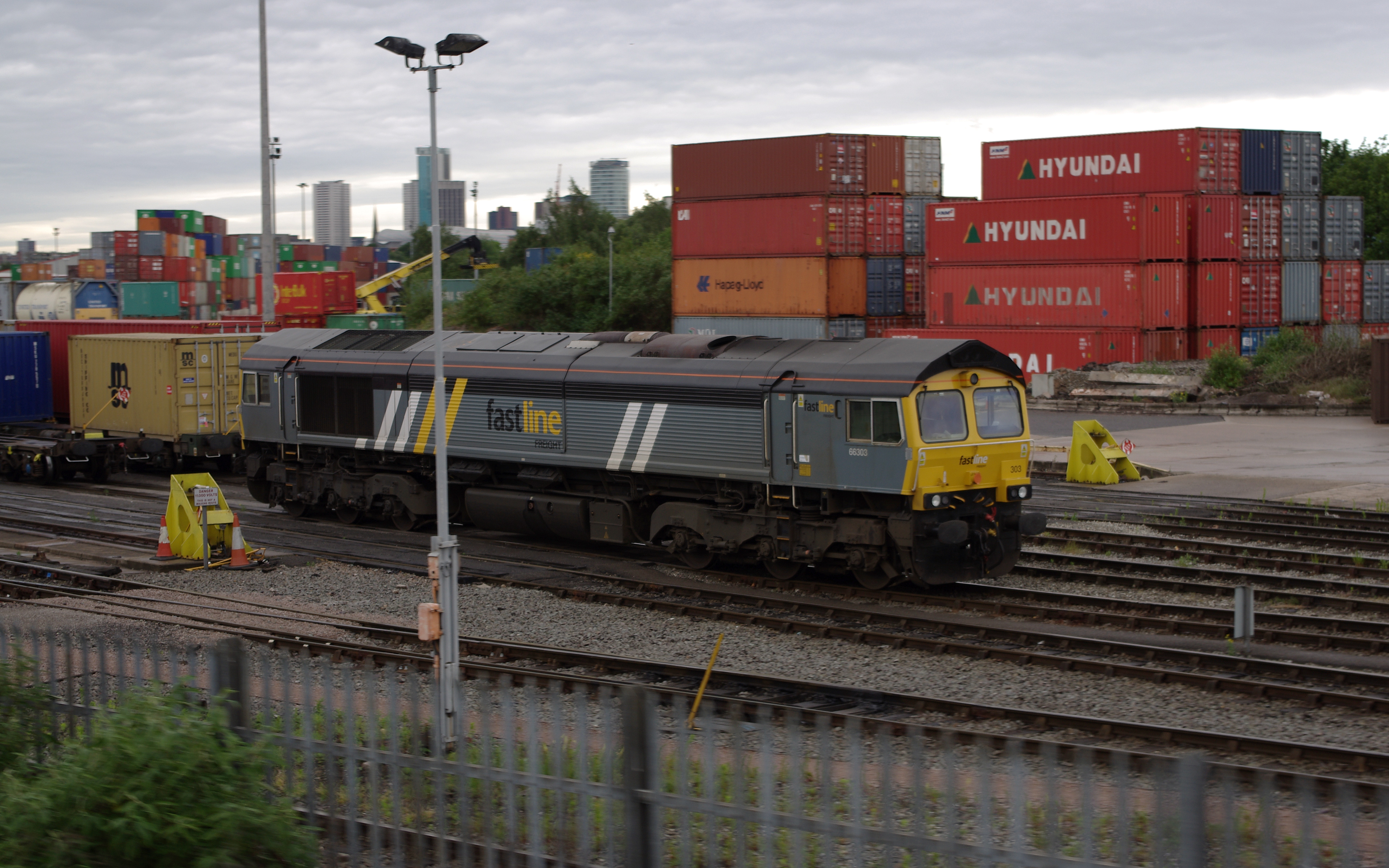
Birmingham MMB 03 Lawley Street Freightliner Terminal

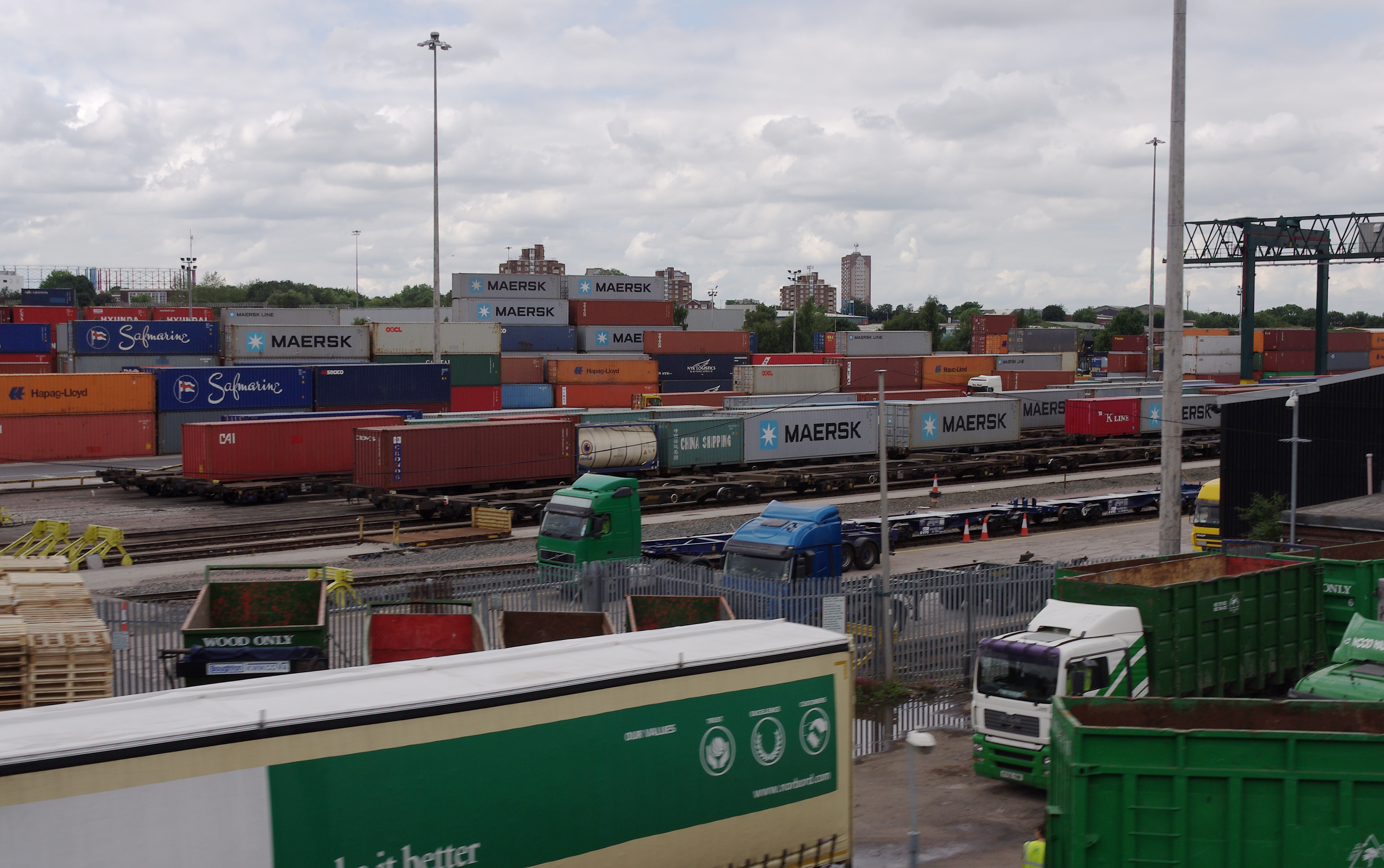
Birmingham MMB 29 Lawley Street Freightliner Terminal

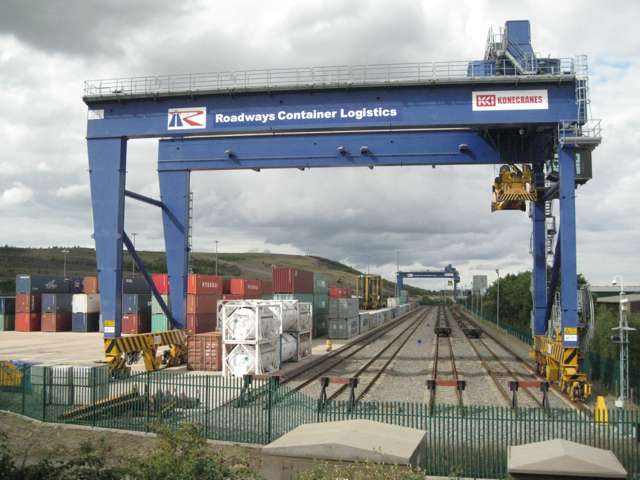
Birmingham Intermodal Freight Terminal, Birch Coppice - geograph.org.uk - 2553243

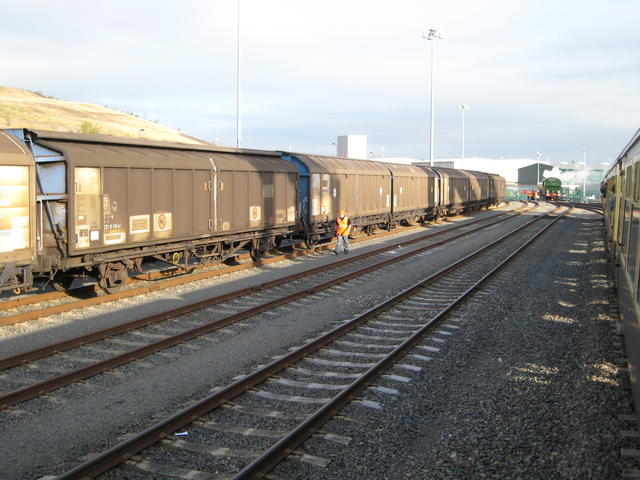
Birch Coppice - geograph.org.uk - 603325

Intermodal freight transport requires rail and road connections. There are already some inland ports in the UK but a new one is planned next to the F2N route near Hinckley. The developer is Tritax Symmetry. The complex would be built just south of the existing F2N railway and just west of the M69 motorway at junction 2. A consultation ending mid-January 2022 was held. It is claimed there will be 8,400 jobs created. Tritax claimed it is in an ideal strategic location with road links, F2N railway and also access to other key ports such as Southampton and Liverpool. The further claim was that 20% of UK manufacturing capability and 45% of British rail freight pass through the Midlands and regard the area as "The Golden Triangle". However, there is already opposition to the site from local residents and South Leicestershire MP Alberto Costa.

=== Felixstowe to Ipswich area improvements and doubling ===
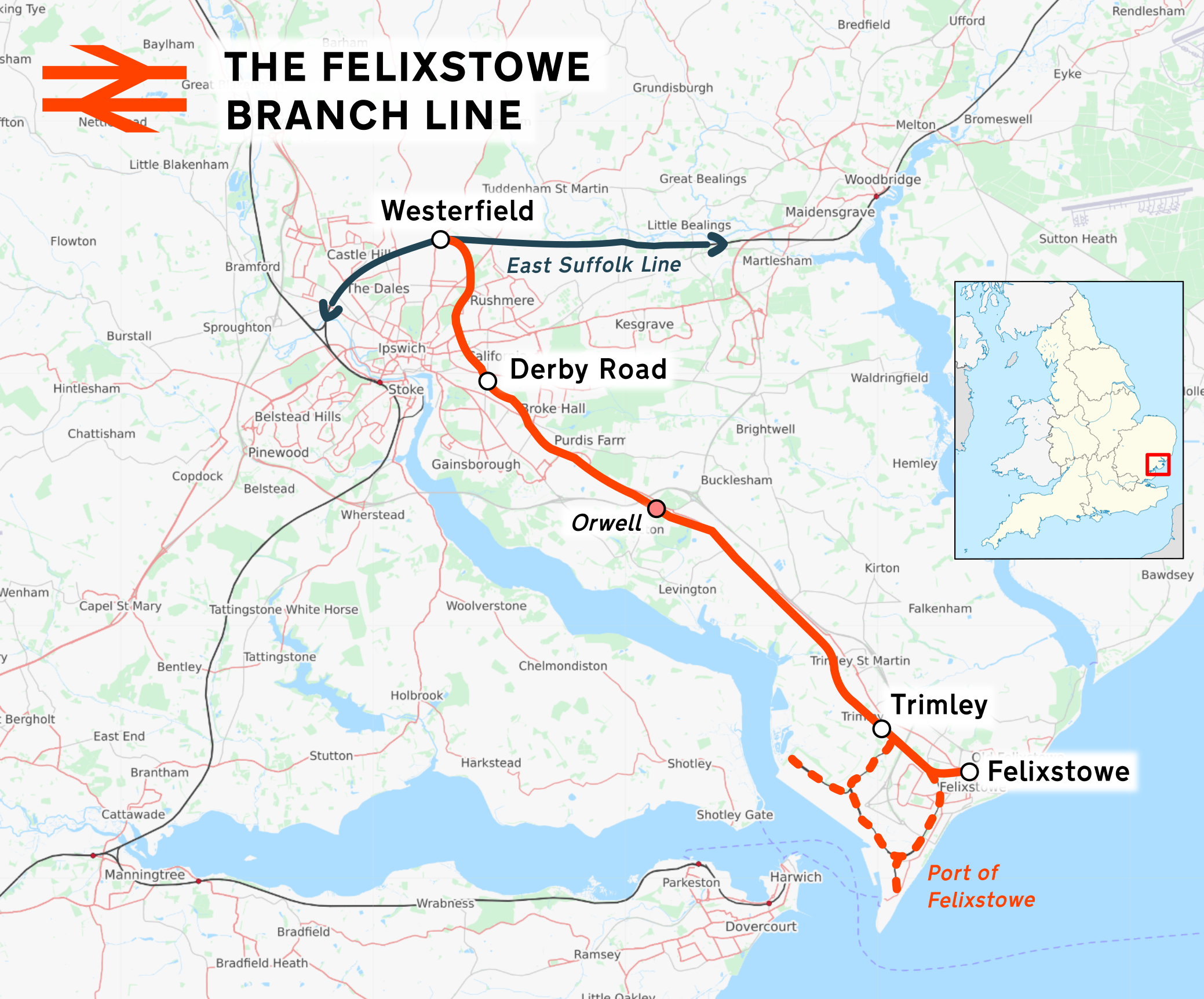
Felixstowe branch line

The Ipswich to Felixstowe section of F2N is a bottleneck because there is no alternative route, it is not electrified and it is single track. In addition, before the upgrade freight trains had to travel south at Ipswich through congested railway territory and then through London to go north to the Midlands to avoid having to turn around in the Ipswich station area. The F2N cross-country route is much shorter. For these reasons a new 1 km line/chord in Ipswich was constructed to remove this bottleneck and enhance capacity.

=== Ely to Soham doubling and other improvements ===
Soham railway station closed to passengers in 1965, and reopened in December 2021. This scheme involved doubling a section of line between Ely and Soham. The feasibility study submitted showed it would need additional land purchase and level crossing modifications. This would have required an order under the Transport and Works Act 1992 (TWAO). As there were no funds available, the scheme was declined.

=== Werrington dive-under ===
A schematic of Werrington Junction. The left-hand side details the current layout and the right-hand side the proposed layout as at November 2018. New sections of track are shown in red and sections of track to be dismantled are shown in green.

The work began in March 2020 and involved building a new double track railway that dives under the East Coast Main Line (ECML) at Werrington. A partial closure of the ECML for nine days in January 2021 was necessary. A curved concrete box tunnel weighing over 11,000 tonnes was then pushed into place under the ECML. This was the first time that a curved concrete box has been installed using this method in the UK. This new line removes constraints caused by slower freight trains from F2N having to cross over the high-speed ECML. The Werrington dive-under is also referred to by Network Rail as the Werrington Grade Separation. It was officially opened by the Rail Minister Chris Heaton-Harris on 14 December 2021. Although it is officially intended to improve capacity on the ECML by removing freight from the line, it has the added benefit of improving freight capacity on the F2N route. The major resignalling project for freight was completed early September 2021.

=== Midland Main Line Leicester area upgrade and electrification ===
Electrification and capacity enhancement of the F2N project requires electrification of the Midland Main Line (MML) in the Leicester area. The MML electrification and modernisation project has been off-and-on for decades. In 1977, the Parliamentary Select Committee recommended electrification of more of Britain's rail network, and in 1979 British Rail (BR) presented options that included electrifying the MML by the year 2000. By 1983, the line to Bedford was electrified but electrification to Leicester, Nottingham and Sheffield did not happen. In 2012, the government proposed and announced electrification of the line. The upgrade was part of the HLOS High Level Output Specification for Control Period 5 published by the UK Government in 2012. In June 2015, Patrick McLoughlin informed Parliament that MML electrification was being paused. On 30 September 2015 McLoughlin announced a restart to the scheme. The dates were now later than originally planned, with electrification to Leicester, Derby, Nottingham and Sheffield by 2023. The line from Kettering to Corby was to be doubled, and indeed Network Rail began work in June 2015. The Enhancements plan update of January 2016 showed the project on target. On 27 July 2017 another briefing paper was published including a section on the MML. After this document there was an announcement by the new Secretary of State for Transport Chris Grayling saying electrification north of Kettering to Leicester, Derby, Nottingham and Sheffield had been cancelled. Network Rail also produced a document "Leicester Area Strategic Advice" that ruled out any grade separation work in the area.

The Transport Select Committee meeting on 23 March 2021 published a report into the Trains fit for the Future ongoing enquiry, calling for a rolling programme of electrification and again the MML was an active candidate. It was reported and confirmed in Modern Railways that work was ongoing to progress the project north of Market Harborough through Leicester all the way to Sheffield and the plan was for the route to be divided into eight discrete sections. This was followed on 18 November 2021 by the publication of the Integrated Rail Plan (IRP). This promised full MML electrification and upgrades. On 21 December 2021 the DfT officially announced that work would start 24 December 2021 on electrification of the section of line between Kettering and Market Harborough. It was then confirmed that electrification and modernisation would continue as far as Wigston. In April 2025 it was confirmed this project was completed on time and under budget.

=== The Nuneaton North Chord ===
This piece of infrastructure was approved in 2010. It was completed and opened on 15 November 2012. The chord allows freight traffic approaching Nuneaton from Felixstowe via the Birmingham–Peterborough line to proceed north on the West Coast Main Line (WCML) without conflicting with southbound main-line trains. It consists of a 0.9-mile chord from the existing flyover over the WCML to join the line to the north. A Transport & Works Act Order for the Nuneaton North Chord was granted by the Secretary of State for Transport in July 2010. Work began in mid-2011.

=== Traction Decarbonisation Network Strategy ===
In September 2020 the TDNS Traction Decarbonisation Network Strategy Interim Business case was published but dated 31 July 2020. The principal recommendation was further electrification of 13,000 km (single track kilometres) of UK railways. The map with principal and core lines on page 79 figure 14 showed F2N as a core project to achieve freight decarbonisation. The railfreight flows from Felixstowe were described as key but did not use the phrase F2N. Later in the large report the route was further identified as key but broke up into 4 sections and the whole line called F2MN (Felixstowe to Midlands) rather than F2N. The four sections were labeled F2MN Western, F2MN, Central, F2MN Eastern, and F2MN Ipswich to Felixstowe. However, the TDNS has been quietly abandoned as of October 2022.

== Reactions from independent people ==
2012 Department for Transport plans for UK rail electrification showing Electric Spine in yellow/green

The managing director of GB Railfreight, John Smith, questioned the prioritisation of the Electric Spine particularly over F2N. He was quoted as saying that he did not understand the electric spine prioritisation. He questioned the reviving and electrifying of the railway between Oxford and Bletchley that had not been used for sometime before electrification across Suffolk—i.e. F2N. He stated that "the majority of electrification schemes in the UK [are to] support the passenger network." In July 2020 the chairs of England's Economic Heartland, Midlands Connect and Transport East jointly wrote a letter to the Chancellor of the Exchequer both to express concern for the lack of action on F2N capacity improvements, but also to express support for the work already done.

== See also ==
- Campaign to Electrify Britain's Railway
- Electric Spine
- East West Rail
- Felixstowe to Nuneaton capacity scheme
- Freight route utilisation strategy
- Freight route utilisation strategy: F2N capacity
- Great Eastern Main Line
- Inland port
- Intermodal freight transport
- Intermodal railfreight in Great Britain
- Midland Main Line upgrade
- West Coast Main Line route modernisation
