= Midland Main Line upgrade =

Railway upgrade in the United Kingdom

The Midland Main Line (MML), a major railway line in the United Kingdom, has undergone various upgrades between 2015 and 2025. The current programme of upgrades began in 2012, although electrification was proposed a number of times previously. The programme includes electrification of the railway line between Bedford, Wellingborough, Corby, Leicester, Derby, Nottingham and Sheffield. The routes between Nottingham and Sheffield and the Erewash Valley line were not included at this time, only the line between Derby and Sheffield. The upgrade was part of the HLOS (High Level Output Specification) for Control Period 5 published by the UK Government in 2012.

To obtain all the benefits of using electric traction, the line from Bedford to St Pancras is also being upgraded which includes boosting the power supply. Parts of the line have been classed as having congested infrastructure. This is another reason for the upgrade.

The upgrading of the overhead line equipment (OLE) south of Bedford is underway to allow 125 mph (201 km/h) running and is due for completion in late 2025. The Kettering to South Wigston stretch was energised in July 2024. Further electrification on the line was paused in July 2025.

2012 Department for Transport plans for UK rail electrification by 2019 including MML electrification and Electric Spine (yellow/green).

== Background ==
The commuter route at the southern end of the line between London St Pancras and Bedford, nicknamed the Bedpan line, was electrified with overhead line in the early 1980s and completed in 1983. This section is mainly a commuter route. It was the subject of an industrial dispute when driver-only operation (DOO) electric trains were introduced.

As the line is a key strategic artery and a radial main line originating in London, there have been many calls for it to be electrified, especially now that the Great Western Main Line and East Coast Main Line are electrified, along with the West Coast Main Line which was electrified in the 1960s and 1970s. The desire to achieve net zero carbon in transport has increased calls for the line to be electrified/decarbonised. There is also the desire to increase some sections of the line to 125 mph (201 km/h) speed capability.

== History and earlier proposals ==
In the 1970s large scale electrification was proposed on the back of the West Coast Main Line electrification and partially in response to the oil crisis of that decade. In 1981 the British Railways Board published a final document on railway electrification that included the Midland Main Line as high priority. In the intervening years priority was put on other projects such as schemes in East Anglia and the East Coast Main Line. Then in the 1990s, British Rail was privatised followed by a change in government.

=== 21st century proposals ===
In July 2009, the Labour government published a document and said it was looking at electrification of the Midland Main Line, but no funds had been committed. When originally planned and announced in the 21st Century, the line upgrade was costed at £1.6 billion and it was expected that the line would be electrified as far as Kettering and Corby by 2017. It was then expected that the electrification of the line would continue from Kettering to Leicester, Derby and Nottingham and would occur by 2019 and then the Sheffield section by 2020. Again only the Derby to Sheffield section of the line was planned for electrification and not the Nottingham to Sheffield route, or the through route bypassing both Derby and Nottingham – the Erewash Valley line. In addition an extra track was to be installed between Kettering and Corby to enhance capacity. It appeared in the autumn statement of 2011.

A 2014 article in RAIL Magazine gave a detailed account of the work that lay ahead. Rebuilding of bridges between Bedford and Leicester had already been in progress for a while. Equipment for placing the various electrification tasks such as bases and overhead line equipment was scheduled to start April 2015. The completion date for electric trains arriving at Sheffield Midland station was cited as December 2020 – the cost given as £1.3 billion and also included three station modifications at Leicester, Derby and Sheffield. 422 single track miles (675 km) of wiring was supposed to occur and a total of 120 bridges modified. Bradway tunnel had already had some heavy maintenance. It was further pointed out that ECAM had been used (as in the project had been through this procedure)- a term the treasury used meaning Enhancements Cost Adjustment Mechanism. Pre-ECAM the cost had been quoted at £900 million. The whole MML scheme also overlapped with the Electric Spine project.

In June 2015, the Secretary of State for Transport Patrick McLoughlin informed Parliament the electrification project was being paused, resulting in criticism from local MPs. Mcloughlin said "'better services' could be delivered on Midland Mainline before electrification was completed". He blamed "Network Rail for rising costs and missed targets". Lilian Greenwood who at the time was Shadow Transport Secretary, and also an MP for Nottingham South, accused the government of being cynical and that they had delayed this announcement until after the 2015 United Kingdom general election which took place the previous month. There were also complaints that money had been wasted on civil engineering interventions that were no longer needed.

On 30 September 2015 McLoughlin restarted the scheme. The new expected completion dates were now three years later than originally planned, with electrification to Kettering and Corby now targeted for completion in 2019 and then to Leicester, Derby, Nottingham and Sheffield by 2023. The line from Kettering to Corby was to be doubled, and indeed Network Rail began work in June 2015. The Enhancements plan update of January 2016 showed the project on target. On 27 July 2017, a further briefing paper was issued and the Midland Main Line had a section of its own. This document, and the subsequent announcement by the new Secretary of State for Transport Chris Grayling said the electrification scheme north of Kettering to Derby, Nottingham and Sheffield had been cancelled and that bi-modal trains (part diesel part electric) would be used.

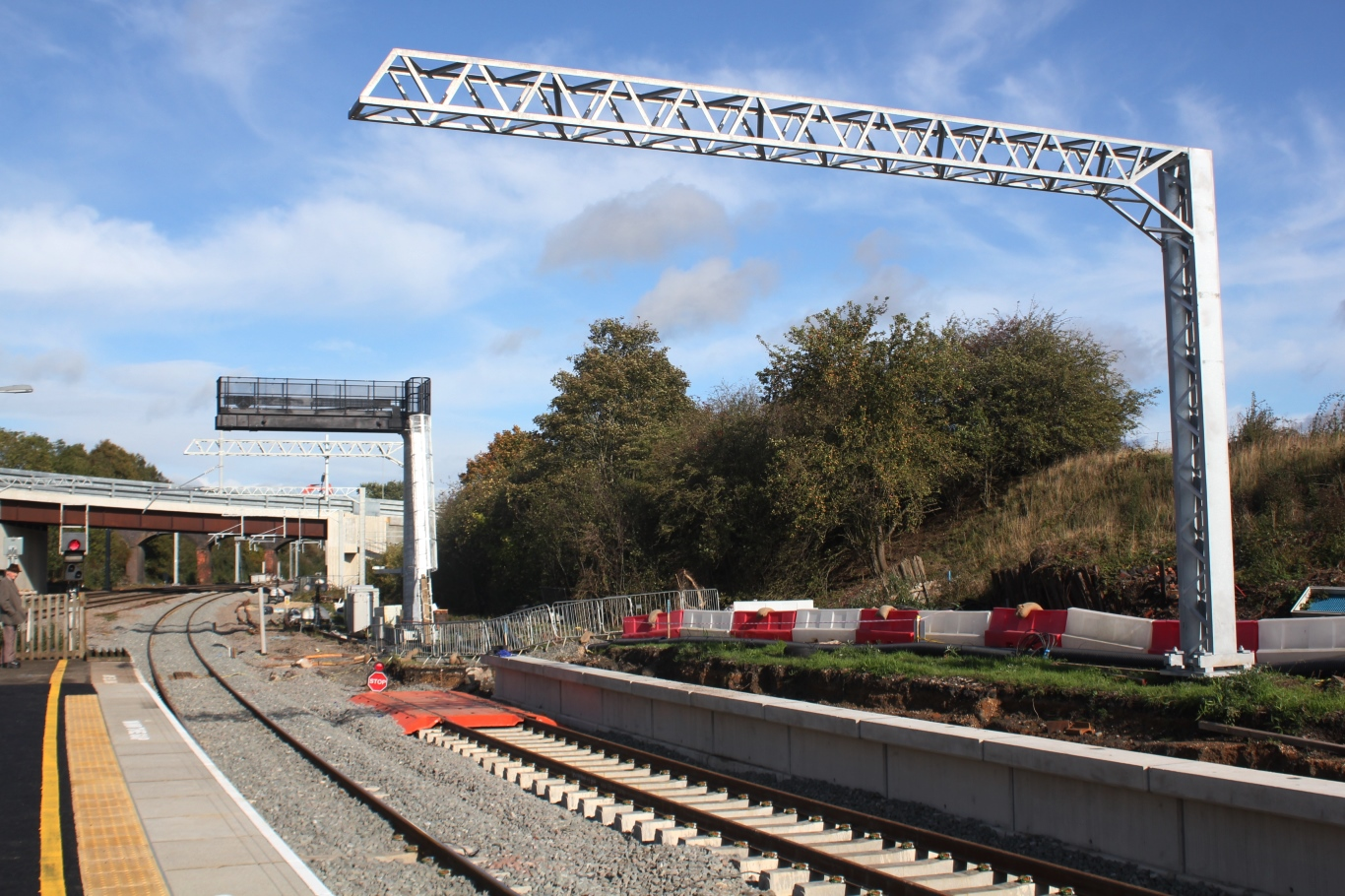
Electrification work and track being relaid at Wellingborough in 2019

== 2020 and onwards timeframe ==
Local news outlets reported in December 2020 that electrification to Market Harborough was moving closer. In February 2021, Network Rail put out a document confirming this saying that devegetation, ecological and biodiversity work was being started on the section between Kettering and north to Market Harborough as a prelude to electrification. They further stated that detailed assessment had already taken place and that this immediate ground clearance would end April 2021. Local news outlets reported this work earlier but they further confirmed it. There will be overlap with some Sub-national transport body such as East Midlands Connect. On 23 March 2021, the Transport Select Committee published its sixth report in the Trains fit for the Future ongoing enquiry, which called for a rolling programme of electrification. It reported that the Midland Main Line was actively being looked at and that the project plans would be broken up into eight route sections. It was reported and confirmed in Modern Railways that the contractor SPL Powerlines was working in conjunction with Network Rail to progress the project north of Market Harborough all the way to Sheffield and Nottingham and that current plans were the route would be divided into eight discrete sections. It was announced that due consideration was being given to environmental protection during the upgrade with Great crested newts being given special mention. On completion of certain parts of the project, environmental aspects and Green credentials were touted.

In September 2020 the TDNS (Traction Decarbonisation Network Strategy) was published. Further electrification was recommended and included the Midland Main Line and fill ins such as Sheffield northwards and Birmingham to Derby. In October 2022 it was reported the TDNS had been quietly abandoned.

A meeting took place in July 2021 to discuss bidding for extension of the upgrade and electrification of the line from Market Harborough to Sheffield a key stage in the project going ahead. The work would go out to tender in September 2022.

On 18 November 2021, the Integrated Rail Plan (IRP) was published. This affected parts of the HS2 programme including curtailing much of the eastern leg but did include full Midland Main Line electrification and upgrades.

On 21 December 2021 the DfT officially announced that work would start on 24 December 2021 on electrification of the section of line between Kettering and Market Harborough. Grant Shapps controversially claimed this work was proof the IRP was being implemented quickly.

On 24 May 2022 in an article in New Civil Engineer, it was announced that delivery was already in progress from Kettering to Wigston and given the section name RS1 (Route Section 1 – sometimes also referred to as K2W). Contractors were invited to a market engagement event on 15 June 2022 for the remaining sections to allow bimodal trains to run on electric power all the way to Sheffield. These sections for continued work were outlined. RS is a Route Section.

In the August 2022 edition of Modern Railways, Roger Ford stated that RS3 will have high priority because of the diversionary route capabilities it brings. The whole project has an advantage in that it is not driven by a timetable change. The eight route sections are:

- RS1 – Kettering to Wigston South (includes Market Harborough and Braybrooke grid feeder).
- RS2 – Wigston South to Syston (some evidence this section may have been split into 2a and 2b).
- RS3 – Syston to Trent Junction.
- RS4 – Sheet Stores Junction to Chaddesden Sidings (Derby).
- RS5 – Trent Junction to Nottingham.
- RS6 – Chaddesden Sidings (Derby) to Toadmoor Tunnel.
- RS7 – Toadmoor Tunnel to London Road.
- RS8 – London Road to Sheffield North.

The September 2022 Mini-Budget, included RS3 as one of a list of infrastructure "projects to have particularly high potential to move to construction at an accelerated pace".

October 2023 saw the publishing of the command document Network North. This document further proposed extension of the electrification of the MML from Sheffield to Doncaster and Leeds.

The installation of the foundations was fully completed as of 28 November 2023 on the section of line from Kettering to Wigston and was energised on 28 July 2024. In April 2025, Network Rail have made an announcement that this section was completed on time and under budget. It also stated that this section had "masts further apart to reduce costs and construction time".

On 6 April 2024, the West Bridgford Wire stated that the government is committed to electrify the line to Nottingham by 2030, with the rest of the electrification to Sheffield to be done by the early 2030s due to the fact it has been going at a 'snails pace'. It also stated that the work south of Bedford is to be delivered in 2025. In September 2024 there was further confirmation that planning and site investigations were ongoing for electrification to Nottingham and Sheffield. In July 2025, the government released a statement that further electrification on the line has been paused.

After the electrification programme was paused, Kirk Hill bridge in Nottinghamshire was still rebuilt as planned. It is designed to allow for larger freight trains to pass under, as well as being futureproofed for electrification, should the programme resume. The original bridge was closed in October 2025, demolished around Christmas and reopened in July 2026.

== Power supply and civils ==
The electrified line will be fed via the autotransformer system. To cope with the higher electricity usage south of Bedford into St Pancras, the upgrade involves boosting the existing power supplies. This contract has been awarded to SPL Powerlines. In addition, a new grid feeder was installed at Braybrooke, just south of Market Harborough. At the north end of the scheme it was proposed that a grid feeder would be located in the Chesterfield area. The middle section of the upgrade scheme would have the grid feeder located in the Kegworth area. Work was announced as starting on the grid feeder in the Market Harborough area on 8 April 2021. The transformers were delivered to the site in December 2021. There are a number of bridges requiring work.

== Wellingborough aggregates terminal ==
Wellingborough aggregates terminal is a rail freight terminal in Wellingborough in North Northamptonshire, adjacent to the Midland Main Line. In 2022, the terminal was the site of an electrification trial. As freight trains are usually top loaded, it is not possible to install typical overhead lines. A new moveable overhead conductor was installed which retracts to allow loading of the train.

== Timeline summary ==
Source for most of section information.

- November 2011 – autumn statement includes electrification of the line
- September 2015 – electrification paused by the Secretary of State shortly after publication of the Hendy review
- October 2015 – electrification unpaused but timeline for completion is delayed
- July 2017 – electrification between Kettering and Sheffield scrapped, along with various other electrification projects in England
- July 2019 – (RSSB) Rail Industry Decarbonisation Task Force report published
- April 2021 – work on Braybrooke grid feeder started.
- 17 May 2021 – electric service from London to Corby starts.
- 18 November 2021 – IRP published stating electrification of the whole line would take place.
- 21 December 2021 – official announcement and press release that Kettering to Market Harborough electrification is approved and works began from starting 24 December 2021.
- 27 March 2022 - Wellingborough aggregates terminal retractable electrification gantries trial takes place.
- 24 May 2022 – confirmation that contracts had been let and delivery was in progress all the way to Wigston South Junction
- 1 July 2022 – confirmation that work was starting on RS1 Market Harborough to South Wigston
- 23 September 2022 – MML phase 3 listed as one of the "infrastructure projects which will be accelerated as fast as possible" in the September 2022 Mini-Budget
- 9 January 2023 – further bridge raising on RS2 section commencing from 13 January 2023.
- 28 February 2023 – announcement that contractors were being sought for the entire route from South Wigston to Nottingham and Sheffield and design approved in principle.
- 6 October 2023 – an invitation to tender (market interest) for the remaining sections including Nottingham and Sheffield was issued. Passenger input was sought for the remaining sections and the feedback was that bus substitution was the least desirable option with more notice and longer closures along with rail diversions preferred.
- 28 November 2023 – Foundations installation complete Kettering to South Wigston.
- 6 April 2024 – A news article stated that the government is committed to electrify the line to Nottingham and Sheffield by 2030 and early 2030s respectively.
- 28 July 2024 – RS1 Kettering to Wigston energised.
- 3 April 2025 - announcement that Kettering to Wigston section was delivered on time and under budget and was ready for electric trains.
- 8 July 2025 - Next phase of electrification paused.
- 3 December 2025 - Class 810s entered service, having been delayed from December 2022

== See also ==
- Felixstowe to Nuneaton railway upgrade
- Great Western Main Line upgrade
- History of rail transport in Great Britain 1995 to date
- Integrated Rail Plan for the North and Midlands
- List of proposed railway electrification routes in Great Britain
- North West England electrification schemes
- Overhead line
- Railway electrification in Scotland
- Transpennine Route Upgrade
- West Coast Main Line route modernisation
