= Electric Spine =

English rail electrification project

2012 Department for Transport plans for UK rail electrification showing Electric Spine in yellow/green

The "Electric Spine" was the name for part of a, now largely cancelled, rolling programme of railway electrification projects in England initially estimated to cost £800 million, but later thought to cost close to £3 billion. The aim was to form 25 kV AC overhead-wire electrified links northward from the Port of Southampton to major cities in northern and central England and dry port container terminals in the Midlands. The government wanted efficient electric-hauled freight trains to compete with road haulage.

In 2012, the spine was set to be completed within Network Rail's Control Period 5 (CP5, 2014–2019). This was not the case, because various works were delayed, suspended for several months, moved into Control Period 6 (CP6, starting in 2019), and then scrapped altogether (despite various preliminary work, like bridge replacement, having been conducted).

Other works associated with the project included gauge clearance for large shipping containers and electrified connections to adjacent electrified routes, depots and freight facilities.

The north–south axis of the link leads to the spine name.

== Routes ==
A high-capacity passenger and freight corridor would run from the south coast through Basingstoke and Reading to Oxford, where it would split. One branch would run to Leamington Spa, Coventry, and the west Midlands, and another would use the re-instated East West Rail to Bletchley (Milton Keynes) for the West Coast Main Line (WCML) (to the West Midlands, North-West England and Scotland), and also onward to Bedford for the Midland Main Line to the East Midlands, Sheffield and South Yorkshire.

== Constituent projects ==
The various projects to create the spine are at different stages of development, and will be completed at different times. The initially prioritised works are fully planned and under way as part of CP5 (i.e., works for 2014–2019). Some projects will be planned and undertaken in CP5, others will be planned in CP5 for completion in the following Control Period, and some remain yet to be firmly committed to.

=== Initially prioritized works (2014–2019) ===
==== East West Rail ====
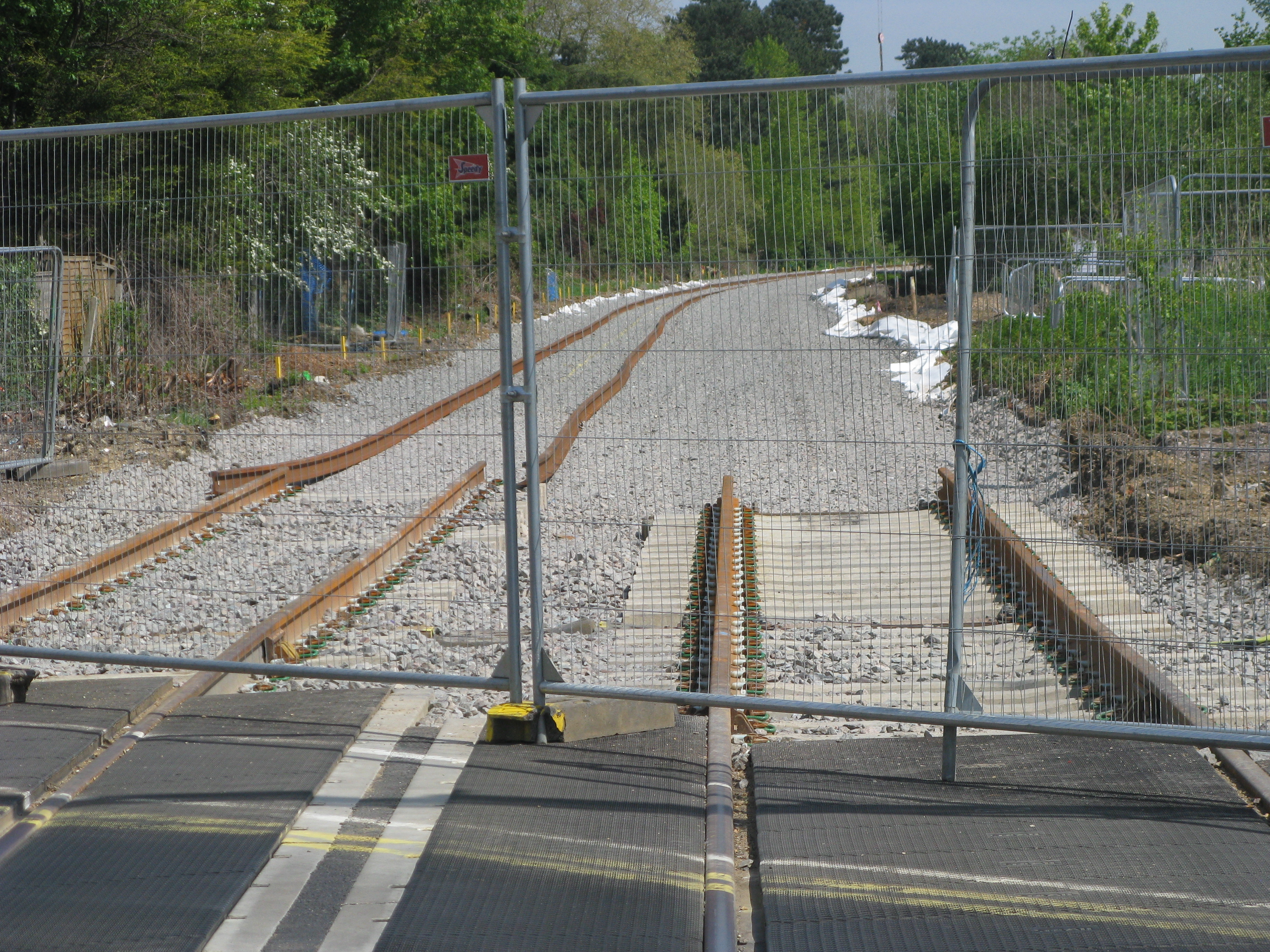
Track doubling on the Oxford–Bicester Line in 2014.

East West Rail is a project in progress to rebuild the former Varsity Line route between Oxford and Cambridge (via Bicester Village, Bletchley, Bedford and Tempsford – thus interconnecting the Cherwell Valley Line (and thus the Great Western Main Line), Chiltern Main Line, West Coast Main Line, Midland Main Line, East Coast Main Line, West Anglia Main Line). As originally specified, the route was to be electrified as an integral part of the Electric Spine. As of April 2015, electrification and track upgrade of the Bletchley to Bedford section was planned, but greater work on the East West Rail than that scheduled for CP5 would be needed to achieve the Electric Spine. In August 2017, the Transport Secretary announced that he had defunded electrification of the line.

==== Midland Main Line ====
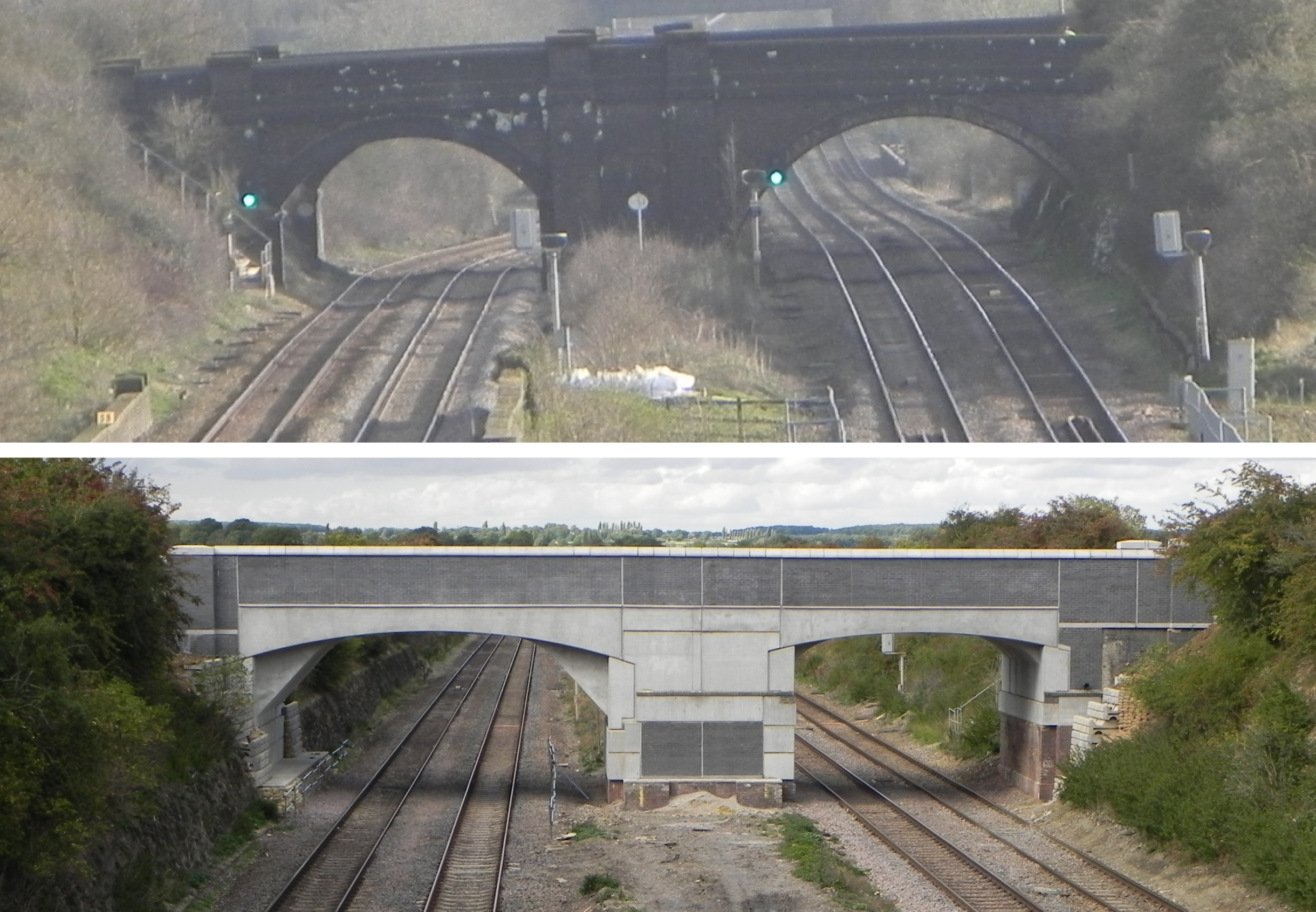
Bridges over the Midland Main Line in Bedfordshire have been replaced to allow greater clearances for electrification and larger rolling stock. Before (top) and after (bottom) the 2014 upgrade.

The electrification of the MML northward from its limit at Bedford to Derby was originally scheduled for completion by 2019, but the work was "paused" in June 2015 despite significant progress having already been made. The electrification to Derby and beyond (e.g., from Trent Junction via Derby to Sheffield—completion originally due in December 2020—and also to Doncaster—originally due June 2021) will be much delayed. On 30 September 2015, the Department for Transport announced the resumption of the work with revised completion dates of 2019 for Corby and Kettering and 2023 for the line further north to Leicester, Nottingham and Sheffield. Again the upgrade to the line north of Kettering was shelved in July 2017 by the Transport Secretary.

Bridges and other structures have been replaced to allow space for the overhead cables and also a larger loading gauge.

The electrification and modernisation of the section from Kettering to Market Harborough is in progress as of December 2021. In addition, the Integrated Rail Plan for the North and Midlands published by the DfT on 18 November 2021 shows electrification of the entire line to Sheffield.

==== Derby and Leicester station areas remodelling ====
Derby railway station, a junction station on the MML, received remodelled track and signalling: trains approaching from the north are segregated from those approaching from the south and west, thus removing the previous bottleneck at the station. The work was originally set for completion in December 2017, but was later pushed to summer 2018. The MML around Leicester was also being considered for capacity-improvement, but with plans being less well developed than those for Derby, and are due to be finalised in CP6.

==== Electrification of the Great Western Main Line and the Reading to Basingstoke Line ====
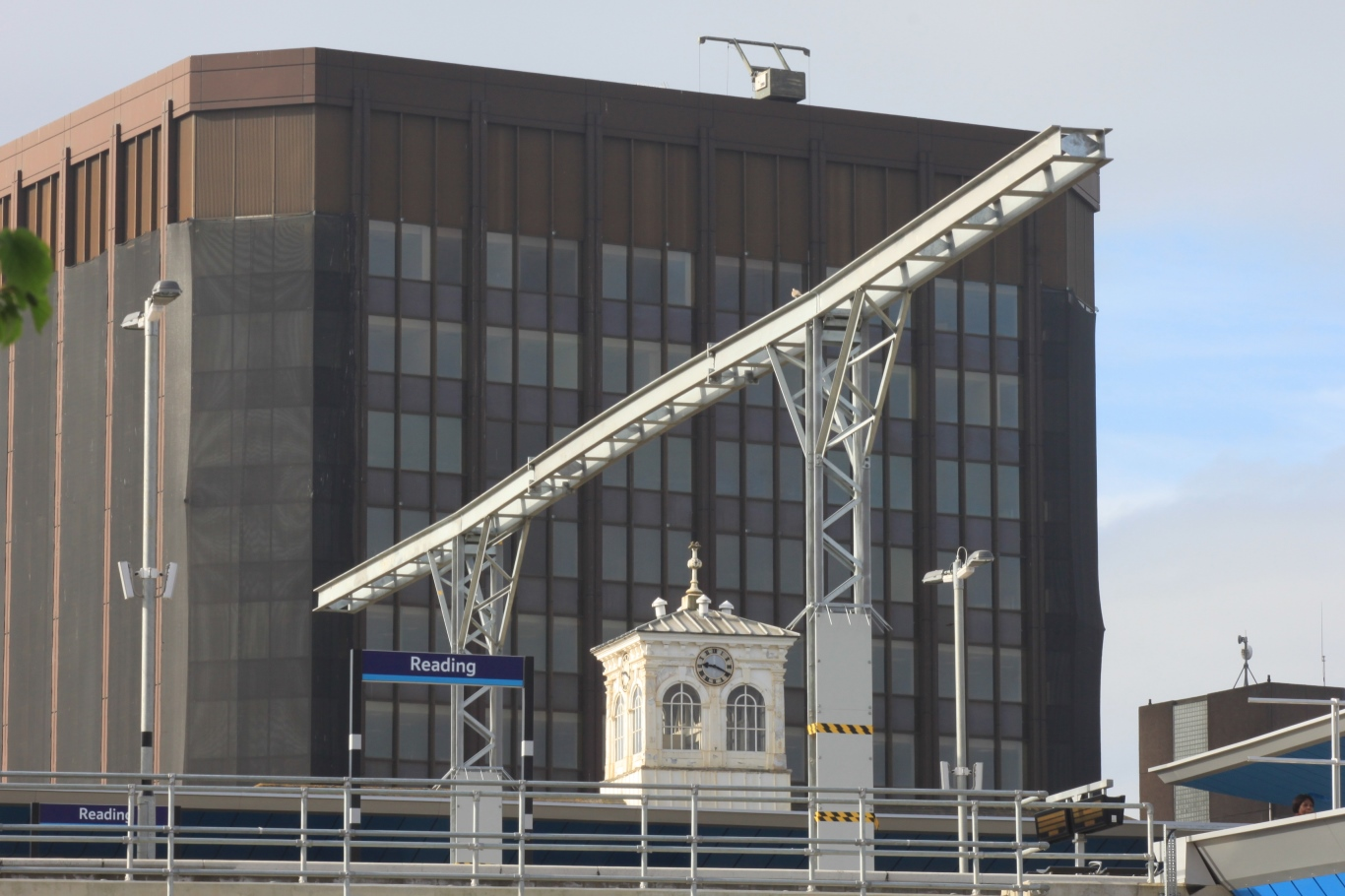
Catenary installation at Reading 2014

Part of the electrified Great Western Main Line (GWML) (from Reading to Didcot) would form part of the Electric Spine. The electrification of this part of the GWML will also include the Cherwell Valley Line from Didcot Parkway to Oxford, which was announced in 2009 as part of the 21st Century modernisation of the GWML. A freight curve at Reading bypasses the station and connects the GWML to the Reading to Basingstoke Line (14 miles), which will take the spine south to Basingstoke and onward to Southampton. The Didcot to Oxford electrification, under way and initially due for completion in 2016, was delayed indefinitely in November 2016. The Reading to Basingstoke electrification, planned as part of CP5, As of April 2015 had no expected completion date.

==== Leamington Spa to Coventry line ====
Of the western branch of the spine from Oxford, only the Coventry to Leamington Line (9 miles) was initially prioritized for the 2014–2019 period of works. It was to have been electrified and the track doubled. However, it—along with other works—has been delayed into CP6.

=== Required works not scheduled for 2014–2019 ===
Overall, the line north from Oxford to Nuneaton is scheduled for "single option development" (the stage before detailed design) within CP6, and no completion date is given. This includes the northern part of the Cherwell Valley Line from Oxford to its junction with the Chiltern Main Line near Aynho, south of Banbury; the Chiltern Main Line from Banbury to Leamington Spa (Oxford to Leamington: 43 miles); the Coventry to Leamington line and the Coventry to Nuneaton Line (roughly 9 miles each).

The South West Main Line, which runs 34 miles from Basingstoke to Southampton and its port, is currently third rail 750V DC electrified, and will eventually be converted to 25 kV AC overhead wires. This test-section of re-electrification will assess the feasibility of the wider conversion of the third-rail electric network to overhead wires. As mentioned above, electrification from Bletchley to Bedford is also not yet scheduled. Network Rail intends to develop plans for both projects in CP6.

== Reactions ==
The managing director of GB Railfreight, John Smith, has questioned the prioritisation of the Electric Spine over other freight routes: "I [do not] really understand some of the details of the electric spine. We are reviving and electrifying a stretch of railway between Oxford and Bletchley that’s been out of use for 20 years, before we electrify across Suffolk [for access to the Port of Felixstowe], double the Felixstowe branch or deal with the Immingham approaches." He stated that "the majority of electrification schemes in the UK [are to] support the passenger network."

Other freight companies' managers also have doubts about the project's benefit to freight transport given the lack of priority given to the lines to the major ports.

== See also ==
- Campaign to Electrify Britain's Railways
- Felixstowe–Nuneaton railway upgrade
- Proposed railway electrification in Great Britain
