= List of proposed railway electrification routes in Great Britain =

2012 Department for Transport plans for UK rail electrification by 2019 including Northern Hub (red), Electric Spine (yellow/green), Great Western Main Line and South Wales Main Line (red) and Valleys & Cardiff Local Routes (blue). For 'HLOS', see Network Rail > Control periods.

This article lists proposed railway electrification routes in Great Britain.

== Background ==
Railway electrification in the UK has been a stop-start or boom-bust cycle since electrification began. The initial boom was under the 1955 modernisation plan. There was a flurry of activity in the 1980s and early 1990s but this came to a halt in the run up to privatisation and then continued in the 2000s, and also the Great Recession intervened. In 2009 Lord Adonis was appointed Secretary of State for Transport and, after a gap of more than a decade, electrification of the UK rail network was back on the agenda with Adonis announcing plans to electrify the Great Western Main Line from London as far as Swansea, as well as infill electrification schemes in the North West of England. The 2010 general election produced a coalition government that wanted to reassess spending, and so electrification was paused again.

In July 2012 the UK government announced £4.2 billion of new electrification schemes, all at 25 kV AC and reconfirmed schemes previously announced by Adonis. These were to be Northern Hub, Great Western Main Line, South Wales Main Line, Midland Main Line, Electric Spine, Crossrail, Gospel Oak to Barking line and West Midlands suburban lines including the Cross-City Line. The Trans-Pennine route from Manchester to York and Selby via Leeds was also announced. Rail transport in Scotland is a devolved matter for the Scottish Government, but they too have pursued electrification with multiple schemes in the Central Belt. All these have been 25 kV AC, as in England and Wales.

== Delays and cancellations of projects ==
On 25 June 2015 the government announced that some of the electrification projects would be delayed or cut back because of rising costs. Electrification work was to be "paused" on the Trans-Pennine route between York and Manchester, and on the Midland Mainline between Bedford and Sheffield. Electrification of the Great Western Main Line would go ahead but the status of the Reading-Newbury and Didcot-Oxford sections was unclear. However, in September 2015, the electrification work was "un-paused", but with a delayed completion date. In November 2016, plans to electrify the route between Chippenham and Bristol, as well as Didcot and Oxford, were announced as delayed indefinitely.

On 20 July 2017 Chris Grayling the Secretary of State for Transport cancelled a number of electrification projects citing disruptive works and the availability of bi-mode technology as an alternative.

Electrification has had much controversy with cancellations and various appearances of the Secretary of State for Transport called before the Transport Select Committee. The Transport Select Committee published its report into various matters including regional investment disparity on the railways and calling again for the reinstatement of various cancelled electrification schemes. A written question was submitted and answered in parliament regarding route miles electrified in the years 1997–2019.

In March 2019 the Railway Industry Association published a paper on Electrification cost challenge suggesting ways forward and a rolling programme of electrification.

In September 2020 the TDNS (Traction Decarbonisation Network Strategy) Interim Business case was published though it was dated 31 July 2020. The principal recommendation was further electrification of 13000 STKs - single track kilometres of UK railways. As of November 2020, there were very few confirmed schemes. As of October 2022, the TDNS has been quietly abandoned.

In July 2025, electrification of the Midland Main Line between South Wigston and Sheffield was paused indefinitely.

== List of routes ==
=== Infill schemes for freight ===
The Chartered Institute of Logistics and Transport has shown that electrifying 800 miles (1,300 km) of track used by British rail freight could allow 95% of freight trains to be hauled by more powerful, non-polluting electric locomotives. They propose three schemes that would make a substantial difference.

1. From Felixstowe, avoiding London to the Midlands and the North. Electrifying a direct link to the West Coast Main Line at Nuneaton, and from Peterborough via Lincoln to Doncaster.
2. From Southampton to inland markets, the Electric Spine. Electrifying from Basingstoke to Reading and from Didcot via Oxford to join the West Coast Main Line at Bletchley using East West Rail.
3. Electrifying links to major quarries and cement works in the Peak District and the Mendips

These proposals are supported by the Railway Industry Association.

=== Northern Hub ===
As part of the Northern Hub project, the following lines in North West England and Yorkshire were to have been electrified: In December 2013 it was announced that the branch from Bolton to Wigan North Western would be electrified by 2017. However, the enhancements delivery plan update of September 2016 moved the completion date with only GRIP Stage 3 (Option selection) being completed by then. On 1 September 2021, the Department for Transport formally announced this would now go ahead.

- Harrogate line: Harrogate to Leeds electrification was proposed, but not yet agreed.

=== Transpennine ===
- Electrification of the Transpennine north route, comprising the Huddersfield Line between Manchester Victoria and York via Huddersfield and Leeds is in progress and due to be completed April 2026. This is affected by the 2021 Integrated Rail Plan for the North and Midlands.
  - As an extension of this the Hull to Selby Line was going to follow: Hull Trains planned to electrify the line between Temple Hirst Junction on the East Coast Main Line south of Selby and Hull using private finance. This moved closer to reality on 20 March 2014 when Transport Secretary Patrick McLoughlin confirmed in the House of Commons that he had made £2.4m available to move the project to the next stage of development, GRIP Stage 3. This scheme was to have joined the already planned transpennine electrification (part of the Northern Hub project) at Selby. In November 2016 this project was shelved indefinitely.

=== Windermere branch line ===
- Windermere Branch Line: In August 2013, the Department for Transport announced that the branch line between Oxenholme and Windermere was to be electrified by 2016. The Hendy review moved the completion of GRIP 3 to March 2017 with a yet to be determined date for completion of electrification. In July 2017 Chris Grayling the Secretary of State for Transport announced the scheme had been cancelled and bi-mode technology would be used.

=== Great Western Main Line and South Wales Main Line ===
- The electrification of the GWML to Thingley Junction (near Chippenham) and the SWML via Bristol Parkway to Cardiff Central was due for completion in December 2018, but was delayed to December 2019, with electric trains only beginning to run to Cardiff from January 2020. Electrification from Reading to Newbury was completed in December 2018. On 8 November 2016, Transport Minister Paul Maynard announced that several parts of the Great Western electrification project were being deferred 'until further notice': these include the line between Didcot and Oxford, the lines to Bristol Temple Meads (both via Bristol Parkway and Bath), the line between Cardiff and Swansea, and the Henley and Marlow branch lines. On 20 July 2017, it was announced that the Cardiff-Swansea electrification project had been cancelled and that bi-mode trains would be used on the route.
- As a spin-off, it was proposed that the Valleys & Cardiff Local Routes would be electrified once the main route is complete.

=== Midland Main Line ===
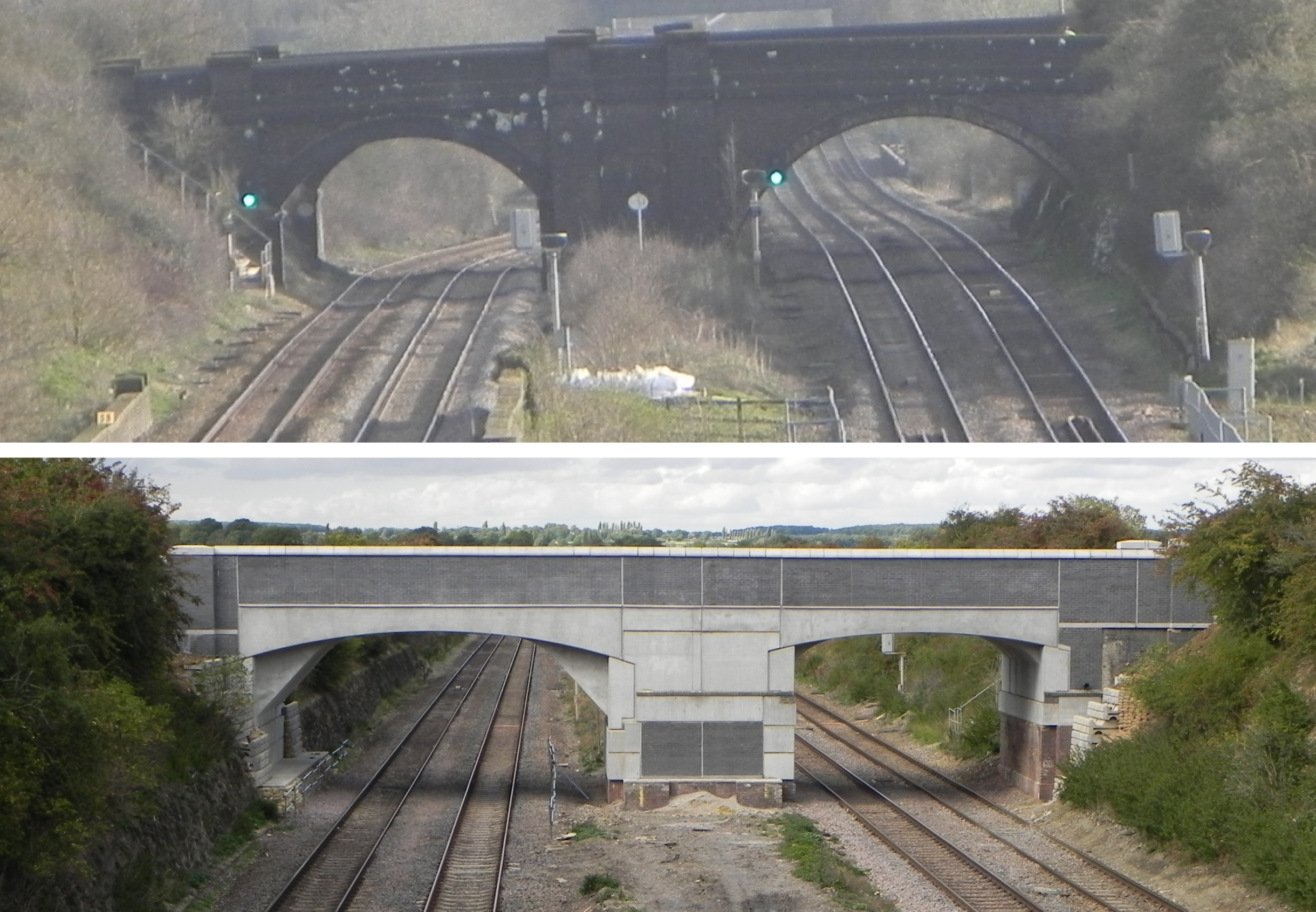
Bridges over the Midland Main Line in Bedfordshire have been replaced to allow greater clearances for electrification and larger rolling stock. Before (top) and after (bottom) the 2014 upgrade.

- The line has already been electrified to Bedford since the early 1980s. This was to be extended to Corby, Leicester, Nottingham, Derby and Sheffield. In November 2016 only the electrification to Kettering and Corby was confirmed as continuing with the DfT refusing to be drawn on dates for the remaining parts of the original scheme. On 20 July 2017, it was announced that the Kettering-Nottingham-Sheffield electrification project had been cancelled and that bi-mode trains would be used on the route. However, in March 2019, it was announced by Department for Transport that the line between Kettering and Market Harborough would be electrified. This would allow easier connection to the new proposed grid feeder at Braybrooke. The Integrated Rail Plan for the North and Midlands (IRP) published November 2021 said electrification of the entire route would now go ahead.

On 28 July 2024, the Kettering to Wigston section was energised. This section was delivered on time and under budget. However, in July 2025, electrification north of Wigston was paused.

=== North Wales Main Line ===
Electrification of the North Wales Main Line from Crewe to Holyhead via Chester was announced by the Prime Minister Rishi Sunak in 2023. The project would be allocated £1 billion of funds following from the partial cancellation of High Speed 2.

=== Electric Spine ===
- This project included the lines from the Port of Southampton to Nuneaton, and to the Midland Main Line via the East West Rail between Oxford and Bedford. This would have involved electrifying the Coventry to Nuneaton, and Coventry to Leamington Line, part of the Chiltern Main Line, Cherwell Valley Line and Reading to Basingstoke Line; also converting part of the South West Main Line between Basingstoke and Southampton Central from 750 V DC third rail to 25 kV AC overhead. Electrification of the Midland Main Line to Leicester, Nottingham and Sheffield is included in the Integrated Rail Plan for the North and Midlands.

=== 2020 onwards ===
Under Transport Secretary Chris Grayling many of the proposed electrification projects were cancelled, despite pledging to remove full diesel trains by 2040. However, after being sacked in 2019, and replaced by Grant Shapps many of the cancelled electrification schemes were reconsidered. The Integrated Rail Plan for the North and Midlands (IRP) confirmed this.

==== York to Church Fenton ====
Work to extend the wires from Colton Junction to Church Fenton began in December 2020. Preliminary work included track and signalling to enable line speed improvements prior to the installation of overhead gantries and wires in 2022 ready for an October 2022 completion. The extension will allow bi-mode trains to use electric traction through this section. The overhead lines on this section is scheduled to be operational from early 2024 along with a speed limit increase from 90 mph to 125 mph. As of April 2023, there has been no announcement on electrification between Leeds and Church Fenton.

==== Stalybridge to Leeds ====
The section between Huddersfield to Dewsbury had the TWAO applied for on 31 March 2021.

==== Leeds to Selby, Hull and Sheffield ====
In 2020, transport secretary Grant Shapps confirmed plans to spend nearly £600m on work to upgrade and electrify the TransPennine main line, and thus electrification was seen to be back on the agenda.

==== Leeds to Bradford Interchange via New Pudsey ====
As part of the Integrated Rail Plan for the North and Midlands the line between Leeds and Bradford Interchange via New Pudsey is planned to be electrified.

==== Scotland Rolling programme ====
On 28 July 2020, Scottish Transport Secretary Michael Matheson announced plans to phase out fossil fuel use on the railway network by 2035. The plan would see most lines electrified, but suggests that intermittent electrification in difficult places may be implemented. Alternative traction will be implemented rather than electrification for some lightly used lines. These are the Far North Line, Kyle of Lochalsh Line, West Highland Line, and the southern portion of the Stranraer Line. Other Scottish political parties including the Green Party support a rolling programme and indeed want it to be accelerated. Transport Scotland has also published a list prioritising the projects and divided them into the categories of 1) in delivery, 2) in development, 3) under active consideration.

In early 2021 a start was made on the electrification scheme to Barrhead and East Kilbride.

In June 2022 work commenced on the partial electrification of the Fife Circle Line. This will involve extending the existing Edinburgh area electrification to Dalmeny, and an isolated area of electrification between Kirkcaldy, Lochgelly and Ladybank. This will allow the Fife Circle services to be operated by battery electric multiple units whilst minimising capital expenditure on infrastructure, in particular avoiding the major expense of electrifying the Forth Bridge. Complete electrification would be possible at some future date. The partial electrification is due to be completed in December 2025.

==== Other infill schemes ====
Acton Mainline to Acton Wells junction is being electrified with a start made in 2024. The line is sometimes called the Poplars Link. Planned completion was July 2026. However, completion was ahead of schedule in February 2026.

==== Traction Decarbonisation Network Strategy ====
In September 2020 the TDNS (Traction Decarbonisation Network Strategy) Interim Business case was published though it was dated 31 July 2020. The principal recommendation was further electrification of 13000 STKs - single track kilometres of UK railways.

== List of routes now complete in 2010 onwards timeframe ==
=== Northern Hub ===
As part of the Northern Hub project, the following lines in North West England and Yorkshire have been electrified:

- Liverpool to Manchester Northern Route: Manchester to Newton-le-Willows completed December 2013; to Liverpool, planned by December 2014 but completed in February 2015.
- Liverpool to Wigan: planned by December 2014 but completed in March 2015.
- Manchester to Preston (via Bolton) by December 2017 and Preston to Blackpool North by May 2018. An October 2017 update pushed back the completion of the Manchester - Preston section. This scheme provides an electrified route from Blackpool to the West Coast Main Line at Preston and then on to Manchester diverging from the West Coast Main Line at Euxton Jct. Originally, Preston - Blackpool was to be done before Manchester - Preston, but Network Rail said Preston - Blackpool needed to have new signalling and the opportunity was also taken to completely remodel Blackpool North and Kirkham & Wesham stations and other remodelling improvements at Salwick and Poulton-le-Fylde. The scheme was to have followed with a new completion date of March 2018. Further delays ensued and a powered electric train (a Virgin Pendolino) finally carried out multiple test runs overnight on 14–15 May 2018, a few days after energisation. Similarly, in the early hours of 13 December 2018, a Virgin Pendolino ran test runs between Preston and Manchester Piccadilly shortly after energisation. The full electric service from Manchester to Blackpool North started in February 2019.
- Manchester Victoria to Stalybridge: The electrification of this part of the Transpennine Route Upgrade was completed in 2025.
- Bolton to Wigan: It was announced in December 2013 that Bolton to Wigan North Western would be electrified by 2017. Finally, on 1 September 2021, the go ahead was formally announced. Starting in December 2021, Wigan to Bolton work progressed with "boots on the ground". At midnight on 1 January 2025, the wires went live.

=== Gospel Oak to Barking Line ===
- Electrification of this line, which is part of London Overground, was announced in July 2013. Major civil engineering with line closures started July 2016. Full in-service date was expected to be 30 June 2017. However, design errors and the late delivery of materials and structures meant that the project was delayed. The start of electric services was to be in May 2018.
- Delays in the electrification of the line were followed by delays in the delivery of the Class 710 electric train sets. The first two trains entered service on 23 May 2019, with the full fleet entering service in August 2019. These 4-car train sets doubled the length of the trains and passenger capacity compared to the former 2-car Diesel train sets, completing the project.

=== West Midlands suburban lines ===
Extensions to the existing West Midlands suburban electrification:

- Cross-City Line electrification to be extended from Barnt Green to Bromsgrove by 2017. Due to delays in the project, electric services started in July 2018.
- Chase Line electrification to be extended from Walsall to Rugeley Trent Valley by 2017. There were delays in the original date, with electric services on this line starting in May 2019.

=== Scotland ===
==== Edinburgh to Glasgow Improvement Programme (EGIP) ====
This electrification scheme and associated works has come to mean Edinburgh-Glasgow via Falkirk High and was due to be completed by December 2016. The rolling programme would then follow with the route via Shotts. The scheme via Carstairs in association with the ECML electrification was completed in the early 1990s. With other infills in the central belt of Scotland there are now (2020) 4 different electrified routes between the two cities with assorted diversionary routes. The December 2016 date was not met and in May 2017 a further delay to the wires going live was announced due to a safety-critical component possibly for the whole route needing to be replaced. It was actually completed in December 2017. The infills included the route from Cumbernauld and Falkirk Grahamston to Larbert, Alloa, Dunblane and Stirling.

== See also ==
- Campaign to Electrify Britain’s Railways
- Timeline of future railway upgrades in Great Britain
- Integrated Rail Plan for the North and Midlands
- Midland Main Line railway upgrade
- Network Rail Control Periods, including High-Level Output Specification (HLOS)
- North West England electrification schemes
- Overhead line
- Railway electrification in Scotland
- Transport for the North
