= West Coast Main Line route modernisation =

Principal British railway line upgrade (1998–2019)

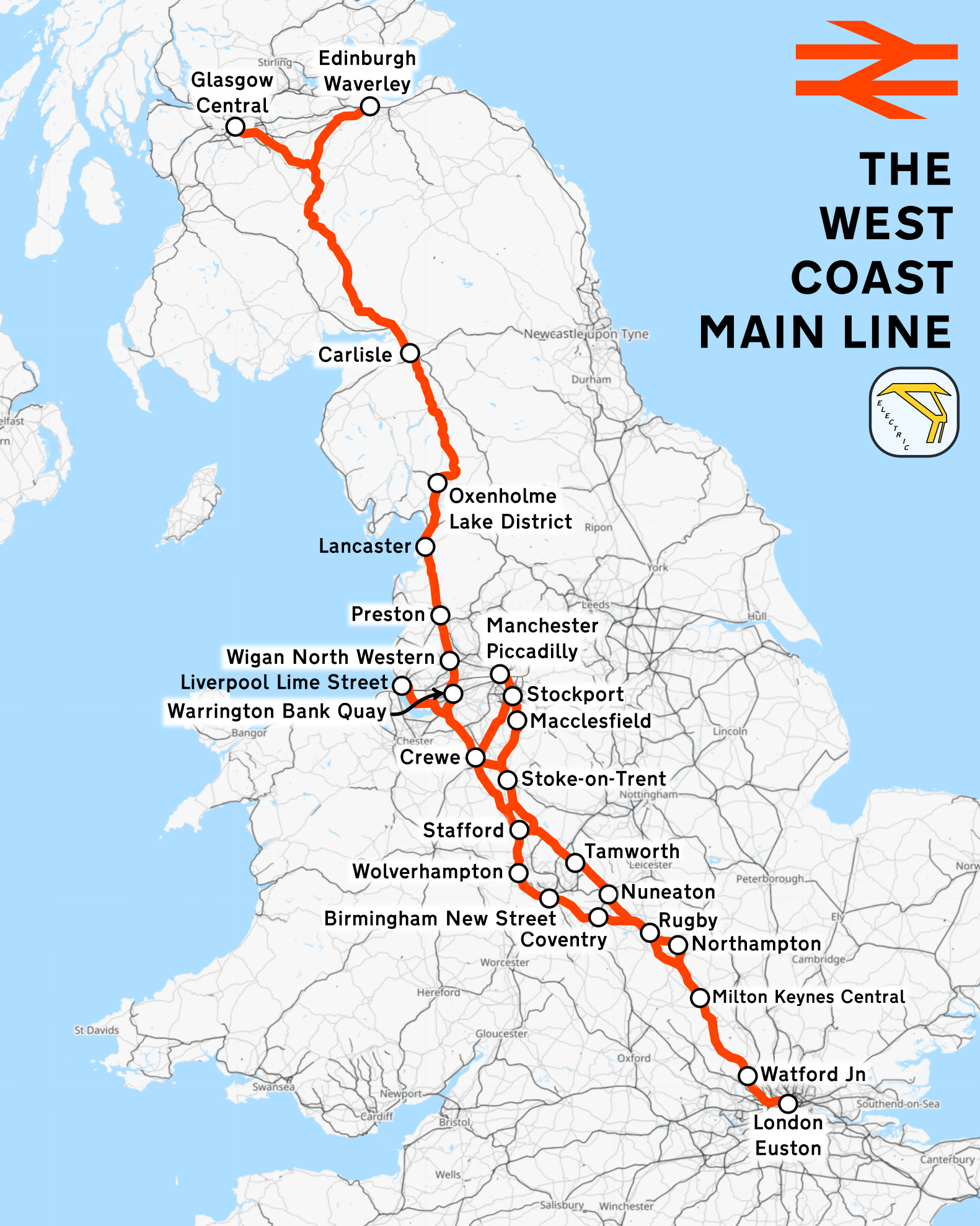
West Coast Main Line

The West Coast Main Line (WCML) is a key strategic railway line in Great Britain. It links the cities of London, Birmingham, Liverpool, Manchester, Preston, Lancaster, Carlisle, Edinburgh and Glasgow. Virgin Trains took on the franchise to operate services on the routes in 1997 and, as part of the agreement, wanted an upgrade to the railway line to allow for faster more frequent trains to grow the business. On 23 December 1994, the feasibility study was published. The upgrade started in 1998 and was completed in 2009. It came under parliamentary and media scrutiny because of cost and schedule overruns. Further improvements such as the Norton Bridge railway flyover were completed after these dates. The project is sometimes given the acronym WCRM (West Coast Route Modernisation).

== Previous modernisations ==
In the middle of the 20th century, the line was upgraded substantially as part of the 1955 Modernisation Plan. Further electrification was discussed in 1968.

The line north of Crewe was modernised by further electrification from Weaver Junction to Glasgow Central in the early 1970s. Some innovative electrical engineering technology was used on the project, including lighter catenary and extensive use of headspans. Substantial new signalling also took place in this timeframe.

The Advanced Passenger Train concept was, in effect, a part of that upgrade. It relied on tilting trains to increase speed on the route, rather than making major civil engineering interventions.

== Post-privatisation modernisation ==
The late 20th and early 21st century modernisation was commenced by Railtrack and without public sector involvement; however, the Strategic Rail Authority was concerned about cost overruns. Railtrack asked the government for more money to complete the project, but the Labour Party's Secretary of State for Transport, Stephen Byers, put the company into liquidation instead. These problems with its cost and time overruns, along with other issues, are usually considered to be the causes of the liquidation of Railtrack.

In 2002, Bechtel was invited to join the project. The upgrade went substantially over budget; regular updates were then conducted by several government departments. The Strategic Rail Authority published a document in June 2003, which re-examined and clarified many of the assumptions to specify the direction and scope of the whole project.

== Technical aspects ==
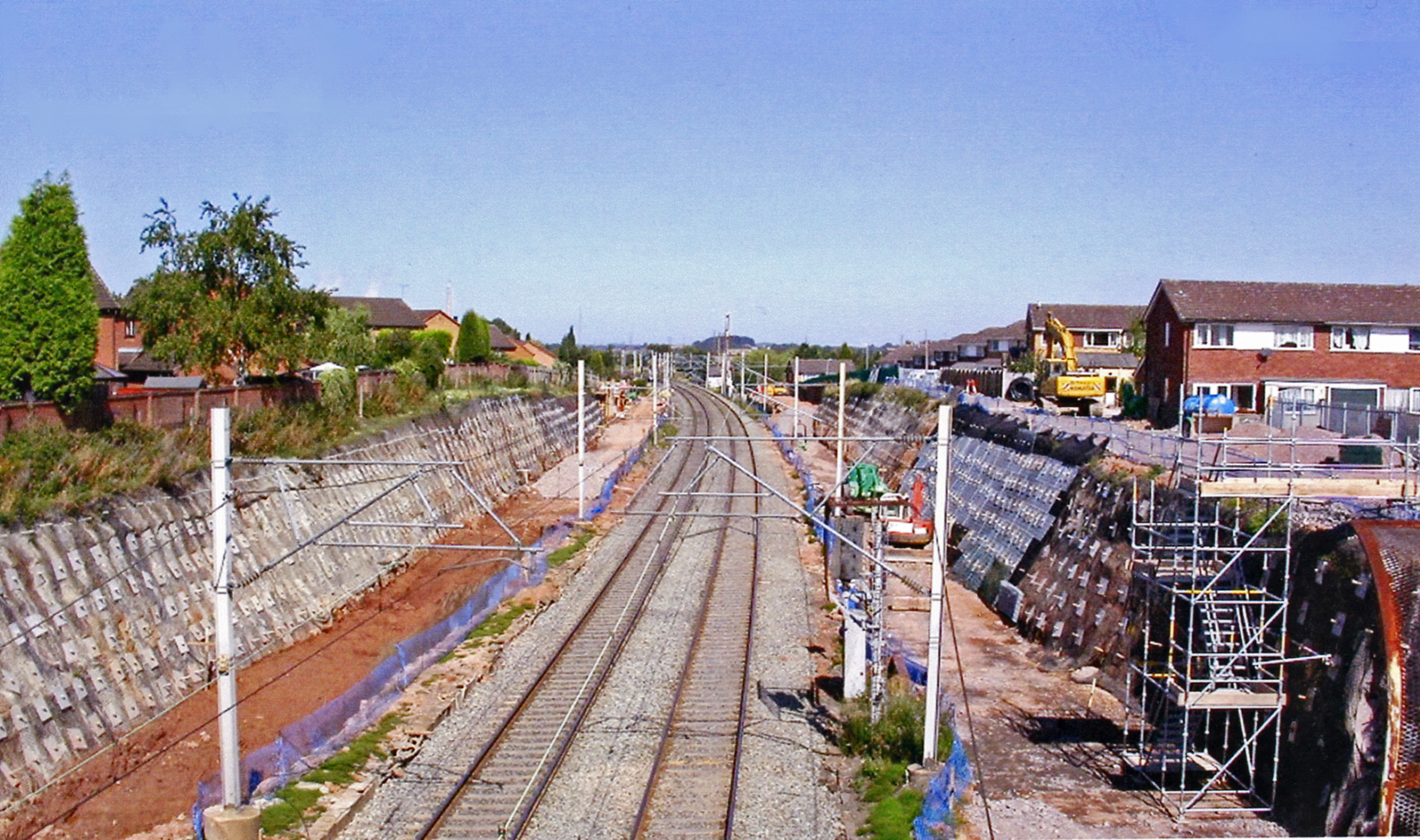
Widening at the former Armitage station in Staffordshire

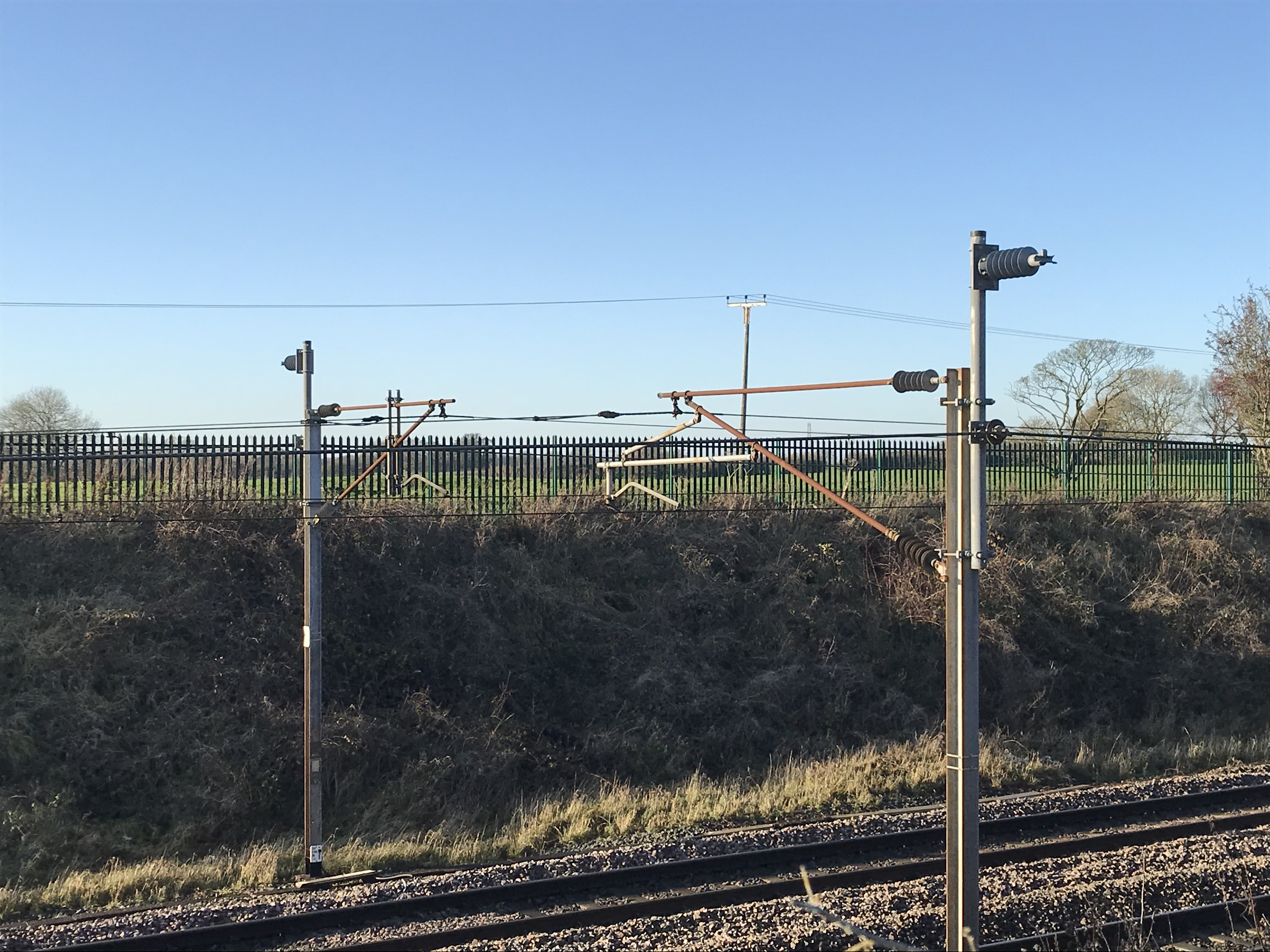
Preston North's AutoTransformer ready

The upgrade involved:

- Major remodelling of Rugby railway station
- Proof House Junction in Birmingham was remodelled
- 77 level crossings were either removed or modernised
- Over 800 points, switches and crossings were renewed, improved or removed
- Overhead line renewals
- Power supply upgrade to the autotransformer system
- 430 miles of track renewals
- Over 2,000 signals were modified or renewed, with better lines of sight
- Quadrupling the two track section in the Trent Valley, including the Tame viaduct.

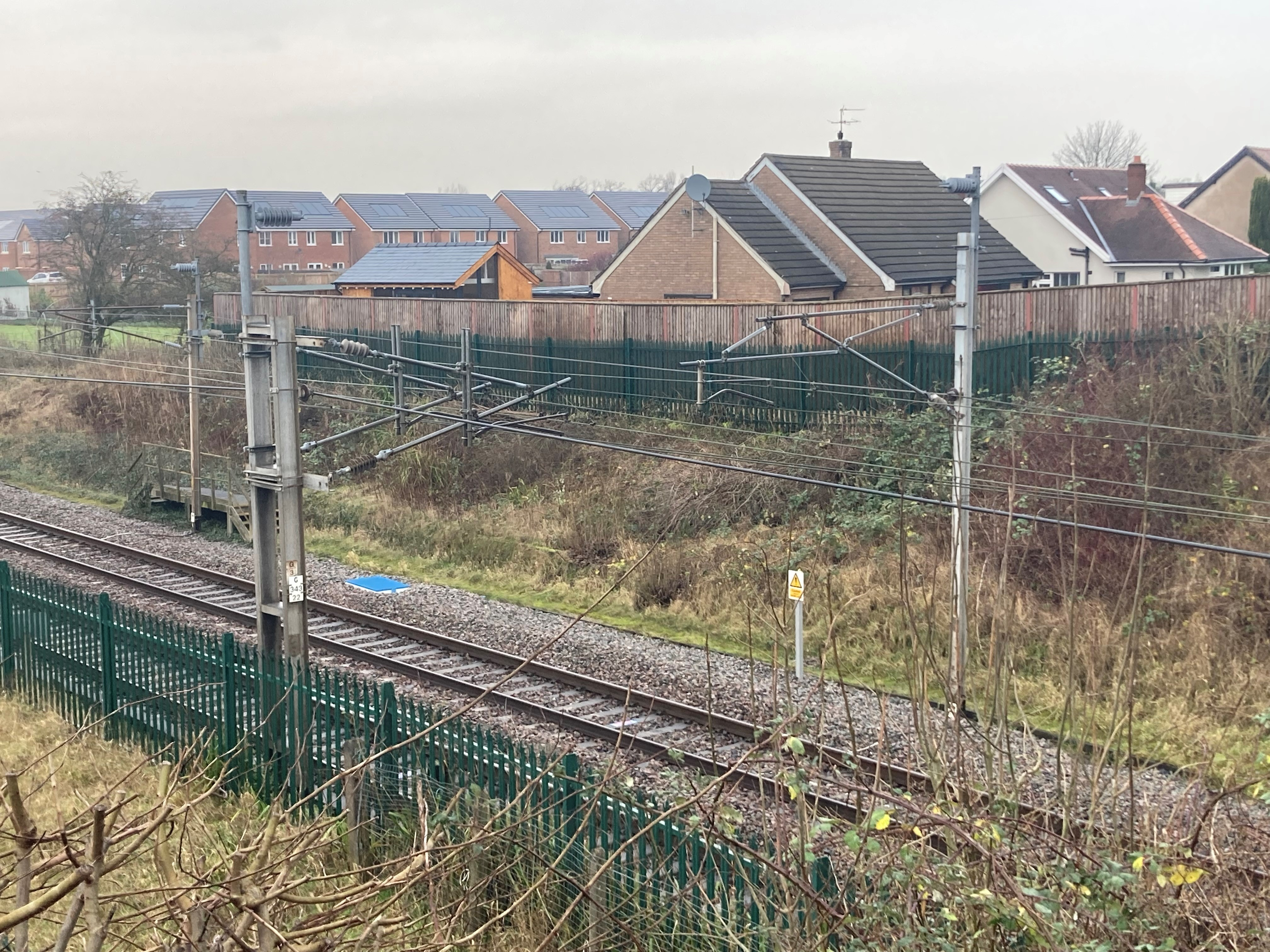
Barton AutoTransformer ready

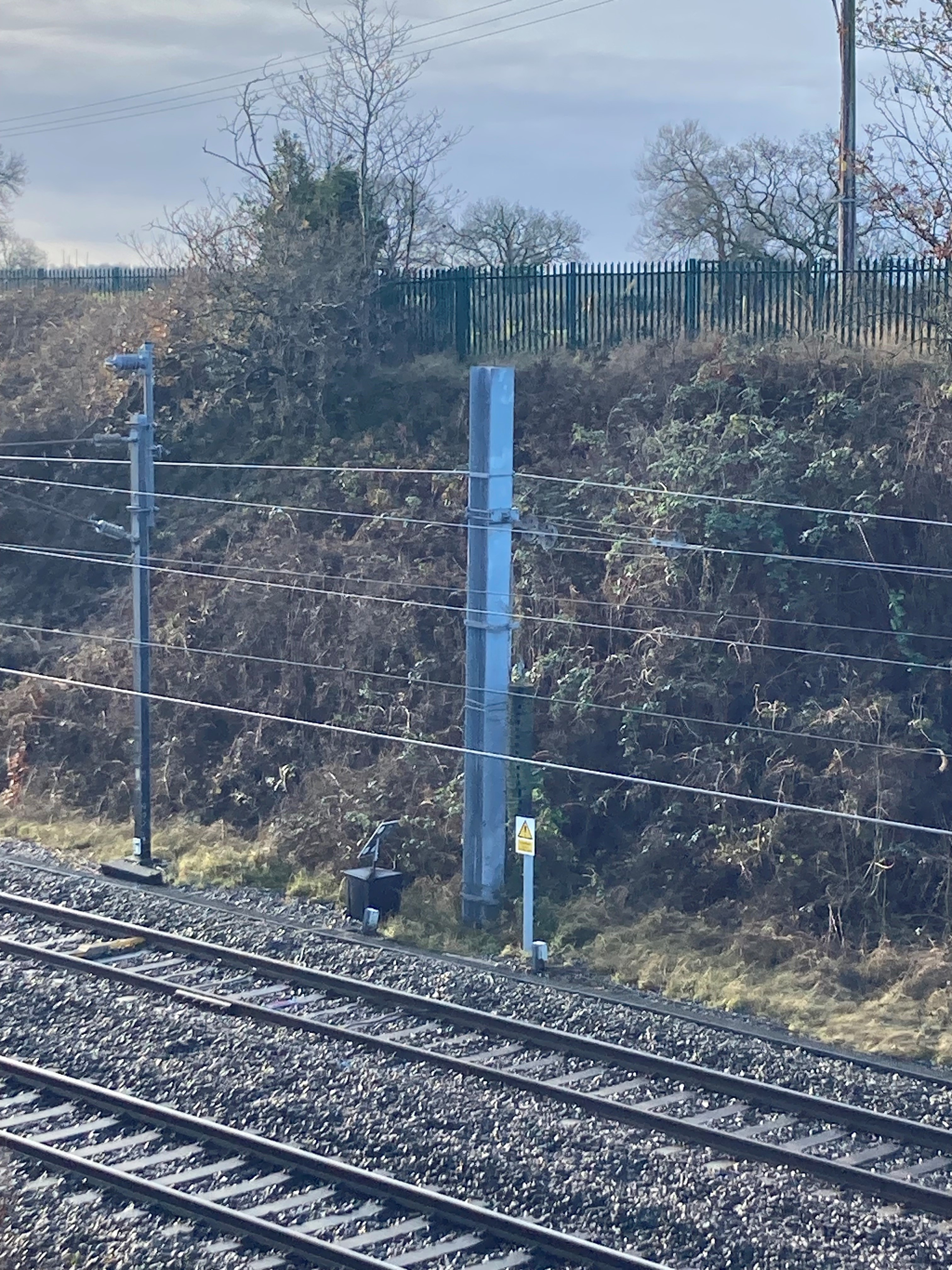
Broughton wicketkeeper electrification anchor

== Benefits ==
The benefits of the project were claimed to be capacity improvements, journey time reductions of up to 28% in some cases, and improved safety. Although Virgin Trains was a key driver for the project, the client was actually listed as the Department for Transport. The length of the project was just short of 11 years (110 months) and the final contract cost of approximately £9 billion. The Campaign for Better Transport stated that the benefits are:

1. Road congestion reduction
2. Carbon emissions reduction
3. Economic
4. Passenger benefits.

It is claimed that the upgrade was part of the reason that the BBC decided to move many of its operations from London to Salford.

=== Capacity enhancements ===
The Campaign for Better Transport stated that there are now 40% more long-distance services overall; there are 25% more between London and Scotland, 50% more between London and Birmingham, and 150% more between London and Manchester.

=== Safety ===
The removal and reduction of level crossings during the modernisation was one factor in improving the safety. A spokesperson for HM Railway Inspectorate said that "level crossings create the greatest potential for catastrophic risk on the railways." Other crossings were also removed with subsequent reduction and modernisation of the overhead line; this also reduced maintenance costs.

=== Road congestion ===
Road congestion reduction has been harder to quantify, but modelling suggests 26,000 fewer car journeys on the M1 and M40 motorways as a direct result, with as many as seven million fewer car journeys between the cities of London and Manchester.

=== Carbon emissions ===
Between 2009 and 2017, on the London Euston to Manchester Piccadilly route alone, the modernisation resulted in a 77% increase in rail passengers, 23,000 tonnes of carbon saving and a 27% reduction in air passengers. (Note: The air passenger reduction was between Manchester and Heathrow, Gatwick, Stansted and London City Airports.) The number of flights between cities served by the WCML declined by 67% since 2004, at pre-COVID-19 pandemic levels.

=== Passenger benefits ===
In addition to journey time reductions, there was an increase in capacity so that a three trains per hour frequency of trains resulted between London Euston and Manchester Piccadilly, and London and Birmingham New Street.

== Future improvements ==
During modernisation, much of the signalling was renewed and concentrated in Rugby. However, money ran out and so the south end of the line still uses the Wembley Main Line Signalling Centre, which controls assets that fail frequently; this point of failure will need to be addressed in the future. Other upgrades are continuing.

=== Ongoing improvements ===
Carstairs has long being considered a bottleneck on the WCML and improvements including signalling, track renewal and other work finished in October 2022. Further work continued in 2023, including on the drains and embankments; it also included substantial realignment of tracks and platforms to facilitate line speed increases for which a 12-week closure was needed.

More power-hungry trains and further electric freight means that, at many times, there is an overload of the power supply on the WCML. Parts of the route, including Preston to Carlisle, is sometimes called "congested infrastructure" due to power supply constraints; further upgrades will be planned to enhance these.

== Timeline ==
Date	Event
23 December 1994	Feasibility study published.
1998	Agreement between Railtrack and Virgin Trains to upgrade the line.
October 2001	Railtrack goes into liquidation.
January 2002	Secretary of State for Transport, Stephen Byers, asked the Strategic Rail Authority to intervene to get the project back on track.
May 2002	Estimate of programme cost increases from £2.5 to £14.5 billion.
December 2005	High-speed tilting trains introduced.
October 2007	First section of Trent Valley four-tracking scheme opened.
December 2008	Work mainly completed.
2014	Works start on the Norton Bridge project.
April 2015	Work to replace bridge at Watford, completed to enable line speed increase from 90 to 125 mph.
March 2016	First trains use the Norton Bridge rail flyover completed on budget and 18-months ahead of schedule.
October 2022	Major track renewal, signalling and simplification of track layout at Carstairs completed.
March 2023	Further simplification of Carstairs and passing loop installed.
30 May 2023	Carstairs station reopens, after a 12-week closure and blockade.
July 2023	Nine-day closure of the route in the Trent Valley-Colwich Junction area for upgrades, resignalling and new track.

== See also ==
- Felixstowe to Nuneaton railway upgrade
- Great Western Main Line upgrade
- High Speed 2
- History of rail transport in Great Britain 1995 to date
- Midland Main Line upgrade
- North West England electrification schemes
- Railway electrification in Scotland
- Transpennine Route Upgrade
