= Railway Industry Association =

- Industry: Rail transport
- Predecessor: Locomotive and Allied Manufacturers' Association
- Headquarters: London, England, UK
- Website: www.riagb.org.uk

The Railway Industry Association (RIA) is the main industry trade group for railway equipment manufacturers in the United Kingdom. Eligibility for membership to RIA is simple in that it is open to all UK-based companies in the railway supply industry. The Association’s principal activities are to:

- Represent members’ interests to Government, regulators, Network Rail and others including the Transport Select Committee
- Offer a forum for dialogue between members
- Provide information to members
- Promote exports of members’ products and service

The Railway Industry Association has four key functions - Public Affairs & Policy, Technical & Innovation, Exports and Events & Information.

It is allied with but not the same as the Rail Delivery Group.

== History ==
The Railway Industry Association was formed more than 140 years ago, but has been in its present form since 1971.

== Structure ==
It is headquartered at Kings Buildings in Smith Square, opposite the Houses of Parliament. It is governed by a Board of rail industry leaders from the various sub sectors such as rolling stock, infrastructure, SMEs and consultants.

== Function ==
It represents over 280 companies in the UK railway equipment industry.

It has published reports on behalf of the rail industry including the Electrification cost challenge. It commissioned research from Oxford Economics in 2018 showing that the rail industry provides £36 billion in economic growth, supports 600,000 jobs and provides £11 billion in tax revenue a year. On 1 October 2019 it published an update to the recommendations to government to avoid boom and bust cycles. In November 2019 it published its manifesto for long-term investment to 2050 in the railway. This was published in the run up to the UK General election on 12 December 2019.

== See also ==
- High Speed 2
- Campaign to Electrify Britain’s Railways
