= Weaver Junction =

Coordinates: 53.3028°N 2.6396°W

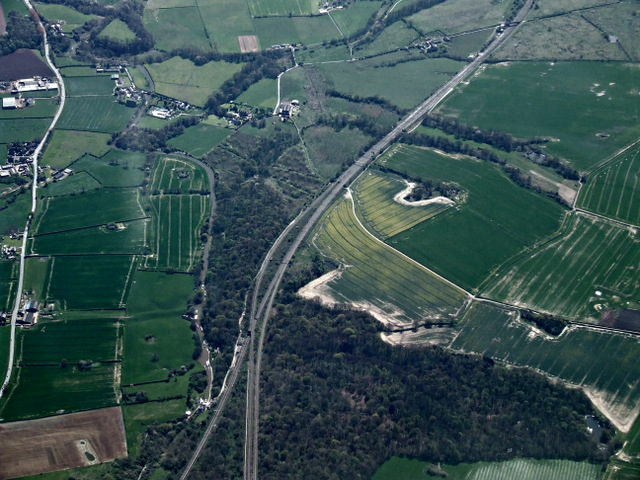
Weaver Junction looking southwards

Weaver Junction is a railway junction connecting the West Coast Main Line (WCML) with the Weaver Junction–Liverpool line, opening on 1 April 1869. Trains bound for Liverpool from London diverge from the WCML at this junction. Weaver Junction is the oldest flying junction in Britain, and also the world. It is located to the north of Acton Bridge railway station.

The junction between the main line to Warrington and the north, and the direct line to Runcorn and Liverpool was originally from the date of opening in 1869, a flat junction at Birdswood. The flyover carrying the Liverpool line over the main line at Birdswood was not opened until 13 November 1881. The junction is now located some 0.75 miles (1.21 km) south of its former location and known as Weaver Junction. At initial construction, it avoided the need for both a diamond crossing and a conflict of routes.

Its location is strategic and is considered a high importance freight corridor. The Weaver Junction area is classed as congested infrastructure when discussed in Parliament in connection with High Speed 2.

== Modernisation of the junction and associated lines ==
The 1955 Modernisation Plan called for removal of steam, large scale introduction of diesels and substantial electrification of the UK railway network. The north west of England was among the first areas to be electrified, but electrification of the WCML initially only went to Liverpool and not Preston and Glasgow, and so stopped at Weaver Junction on the WCML in the initial phase. In April 1964, Doctor Beeching stated he was completely against extending electrification north from Weaver Junction believing there was no financial justification. Continuing the electrification north from the junction was again discussed British Railways Board in 1968 and a document produced and further discussed in Parliament in February 1969. When finally announced by transport minister Richard Marsh and approved by parliament in February 1970, it was costed at £30.4 million. In the 1960s electrification scheme at Weaver Junction, the signaling was modernised. The old signal box was removed, and the semaphore signals replaced with coloured electric light signals. This took place 6 November to 7 November 1960. The track layout at Weaver Junction was also modernised. Major civil engineering work was required.

The electrification of the WCML north of Weaver Junction was done differently from the work south of the junction and incorporated lessons learned as well as newer and innovative techniques. O. S. Nock states the junction was referred to as the zero point of the whole West Coast Route Modernisation of 1970-1974. The entire line was eventually electrified from Weaver Junction to Glasgow in the 1970-1974 timeframe. The final completed cost was £74 million. There were some operational problems later resulting from the scheme and higher rail usage. The extension of the WCML electrification from Weaver Junction was the first major scheme to utilise Mark 3 OLE.

In 2009, concerns were raised and an archeological report issued in connection with a Network Rail application to the National Grid for a boost to the power supply for the WCML at Weaver Junction. It involved running an underground cable from the grid feeder at Frodsham to Weaver Junction. The electrification infrastructure at the junction uses the autotransformer system.

In 2018 to 2019 the line between Weaver Junction and Wavertree was further modernised with new signaling.

Weaver Junction was one of four sites chosen for data acquisition/monitoring and experimentation with ballast packing. Specifically, this was research conducted by Network Rail regarding machines for compacting ballast.

== Accidents and incidents ==
An accident happened at the junction on August 6, 1975 involving a collision between two freight trains. The cause was identified as insufficient braking power. 16 tank wagons, 15 freightliner vehicles and one locomotive were derailed and minor injuries were suffered by the driver and guard of one train. As the two trains were carrying soda ash and alcohol, the location was informally known as "whisky and soda junction".

On 2 March 2020 a landslip occurred at Weaver Junction partially closing the WCML and required the use of rail replacement buses. Disruption was seen over a few days, as the ground needed to be stabilised.

== See also ==
- Double junction
- North West England electrification schemes
- West Coast Main Line route modernisation
