= Campaign to Electrify Britain's Railway =

UK Climate Change public body

The Campaign to Electrify Britain's Railway (CEBR) is an internet-based campaign group formed in 2018, whose aim is to convince the government to completely electrify the rail network in Great Britain. Its slogan is "Down with Dirty Diesel." The campaign promotes a rolling programme of electrification, which it considers essential to improve GB railways and help to decarbonise transport. It collaborates with groups such as the Railway Industry Association, Rail Delivery Group, Birmingham Centre for Railway Research and Education, Campaign for Better Transport, Institute of Electrical Engineers and the Permanent Way Institution.

The group has given evidence to the Transport Select Committee. Huw Merriman the committee chair at the time, put in writing he agreed with their view. Merriman was appointed as Minister of State for Rail and HS2 in October 2022. The desire to achieve net zero carbon in transport has increased calls for electrification.

== Origins ==
The CEBR manifesto states: "The UK has suffered from too many boom and bust infrastructure projects. A steady, planned, rolling programme will reduce costs, speed up journey times, create more seats on more reliable trains and ultimately reduce ticket prices." The group staged a protest on top of Snowdon in 2018. In July 2019, the final report of the rail decarbonisation project was published by the group.

2012 Department for Transport plans for rail electrification in England and Wales by 2019 including MML electrification and Electric Spine (yellow/green).

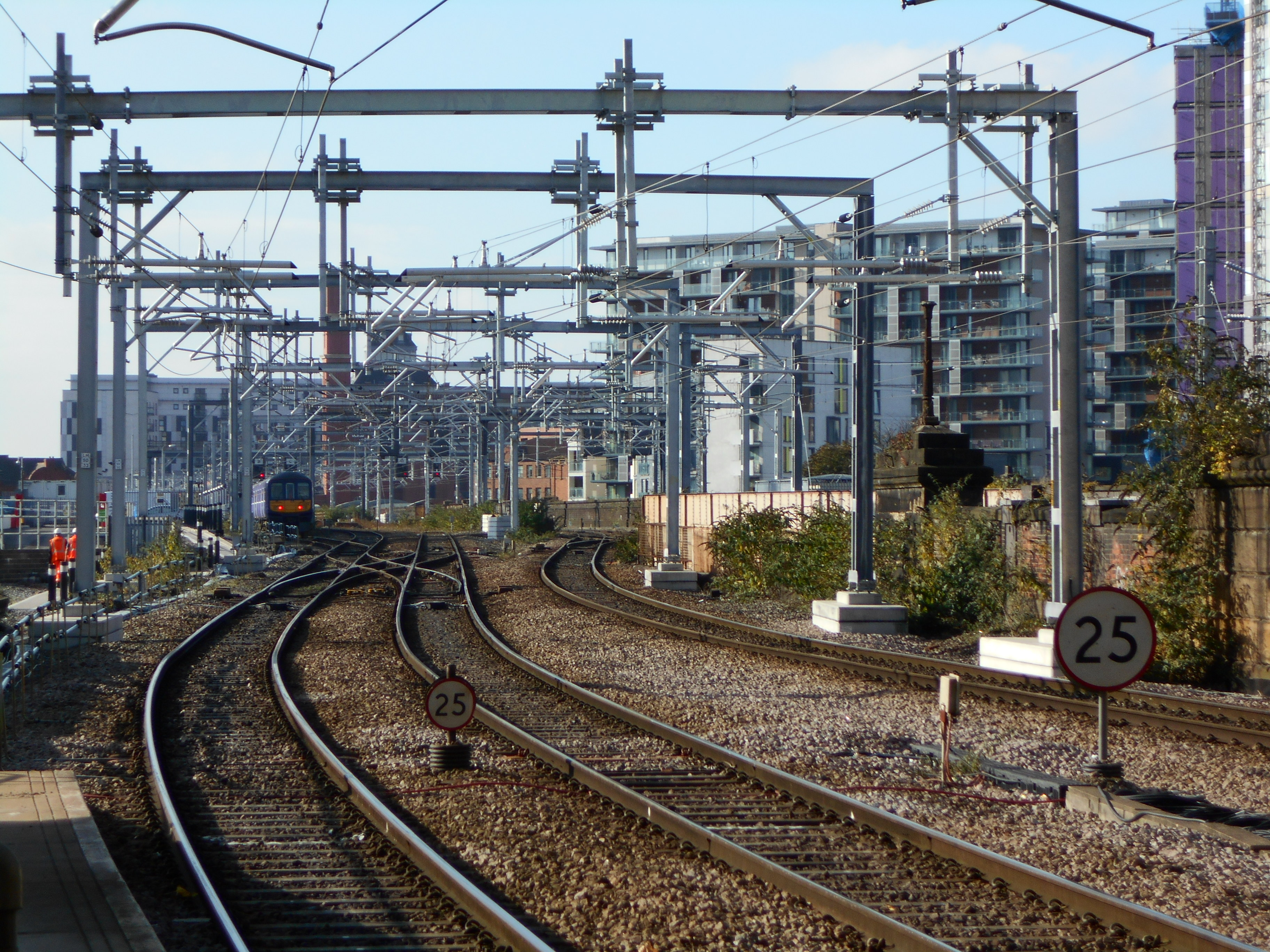
Newly installed overhead electrification into Manchester Victoria station, in October 2015

== Main organisational goals ==
Many, but not all, diesel trains use only friction brakes (as do cars and trucks) to slow or stop the train. This wears the discs and pads, introducing particulates into the atmosphere. Electric trains predominantly use the motors in regeneration mode to slow the train, producing almost zero particulates. The technology does not yet exist to stop the train completely. Using this technology would improve the health of the nation but in particular for people who live closer to the railway. In addition, regenerative braking saves energy and is more efficient and thus helps the low-carbon economy. Diesel trains also generate soot and particulates from the engines, often clearly visible in the air. Electrification vastly reduces or even eliminates this problem, thus bringing cleaner and healthier air.

== Geopolitics ==
Electric power can be sourced from a diversified grid and thus reduce the effects of oil and geopolitics. Petroleum and petroleum-based products were used as a weapon after the Yom Kippur War, quadrupling the price of oil after an OPEC embargo. In 2000, the fuel protests in the United Kingdom virtually crippled UK transport and left transport agencies only a day away from bringing the diesel railway to a standstill.

The rate of electrification in Britain is often compared to overseas and many acknowledge it is a geopolitical and resource issue as petroleum is a finite resource. In addition, the 2022 Russian invasion of Ukraine highlighted issues with regards to countries being dependent on hydrocarbons from other countries with embargo risks.

== Railway electrification in Great Britain ==
Railway electrification in Great Britain started in the late 19th century. After World War II and the nationalisation of the railways in 1948 and the 1955 Modernisation Plan, electrification commenced in earnest. After a pause, the West Coast Main Line north of Weaver Junction to just south of Glasgow was electrified between 1970 and 1974. Small amounts of the rail system then followed, with more electrification occurring in the 1980s, including the East Coast Main Line.

From the mid-1990s to late 2000s, electrification of the network stalled. In 2009, Lord Adonis was appointed Secretary of State for Transport. After a gap of more than a decade, electrification was back on the agenda and Adonis announced plans to electrify the Great Western Main Line from London as far as Swansea, as well as infill electrification schemes in the North West of England. In July 2012 the UK coalition government announced new electrification schemes, all at 25 kV AC, and reconfirmed schemes previously announced by Adonis. Devolved rail transport in Scotland has allowed the Scottish government to pursue electrification with multiple schemes in the Central Belt. This has been followed up by a further commitment to a low carbon economy and a modal shift to enable it. The 2009 government document was refreshed in January 2015.

However, electrification has not been without controversy, with cost overruns and late-running schemes, particularly on the Great Western Main Line. This led to cancellations of projects and various appearances of the Secretary of State for Transport called before the Transport Select Committee. Shortly after this, Campaign to Electrify Britain's Railway was launched to try and mitigate the boom and bust cycle.

== Future railway electrification in Great Britain ==
The UK government aims to decarbonise all rail transport by 2040, a measure that has broad parliamentary support. In September 2019, Transport Scotland announced the goal of having Scottish transport net carbon neutral by the year 2035. This would be achieved by a rolling programme of electrification; where that is not feasible, using battery and other emerging technology such as hydrogen.

In an attempt to mitigate and improve the cost situation and thus persuade the government to backtrack on its electrification cancellations, the Railway Industry Association published a report in March 2019 detailing why costs had risen and suggested ways forward. Campaign to Electrify Britain's Railway heavily circulated and advertised this report. The answer to a written question in parliament regarding route miles electrified in the years 1997-2019 made rather stark reading. It has been mainly agreed that electrification costs in the UK are too high though.

Railways in Scotland are a devolved matter but all parties including the Green Party are campaigning for electrification.

Roger Ford, the technical editor of Modern Railways, often writes about similar themes and coined the phrase “Bionic duckweed". This refers to putting off what needs to be done today because something new in the future may be just around the corner to refer to schemes that are not based on electrification but alternative technologies such as biodiesel and Hydrogen. Other writers have done likewise. Other authors also cite issues with the huge inefficiency of hydrogen as opposed to electrification and the safety of using hydrogen fuel.

In September 2020 the Traction Decarbonisation Network Strategy Interim Business case was published. The principal recommendation was further electrification of 13,000 km (single track kilometres) of UK railways. As of November 2022, the TDNS has been quietly abandoned.

On 23 March 2021, the Transport Select Committee published a report in the 'Trains Fit for the Future" enquiry, which recommended a rolling programme of electrification that allowed for battery and hydrogen. Greater cost scrutiny was also recommended. The report was also highlighted in the mainstream press, featuring how Members of Parliament were calling for a rolling programme of electrification. In March 2021, in the April issue of Modern Railways magazine also reported that work was underway to extend OHL electrification to Market Harborough, but that the SPL Powerlines contractor was working in conjunction with Network Rail to extend wires beyond this to Sheffield and Nottingham. It was reported that the scheme was being divided into eight distinct route sections.

On 22 April 2021, along with an open letter to Grant Shapps with fifteen signatures, the Railway Industry Association published their report "Why Rail Electrification". It was produced in conjunction with their RailDecarb21 campaign. These set out the case for a rolling programme of rail electrification. Both main political parties agree.

In July 2021, the UK Government released the document "Decarbonising transport – a better greener Britain" and at the same time released the supporting Rail environmental policy document. These were welcomed by the CEBR. These documents stated that rail electrification had a major role to play in the decarbonising agenda.

On 18 November 2021 the Integrated Rail Plan (IRP) was published. This included full Midland Main Line electrification and upgrades. In addition, full Transpennine North electrification was included. However, in December 2021 plans were leaked showing the treasury had declined to provide funding to electrify and decarbonise the railways. Further outcry came after it was revealed in The Guardian that the majority of civil servants who wrote the plan don't even live in the North or Midlands.

The Railway Industry Association continues to carry out reviews on decarbonisation in an effort to hold both the government and the industry to account. Although not the same as electrification, the organisation and others suggest modal shift away from roads to an electrified railway, will also help the climate.

== Government reluctance ==
Countries including India and China are electrifying and building new lines at a fast pace. Europe is following this trend but the UK ranks 21st as a percentage electrified. Germany ranks eighth. Worldwide the electrification volume market remains high. Geopolitics and the desire to reduce reliance on oil has once again put rail electrification high on the agenda.

There are a number of reasons why progress in the United Kingdom is much slower. One of the reasons were the delays and cost overruns on the 21st-century modernisation of the Great Western Main Line project. In addition, there were problems with the GOBLIN electrification project. Another reason cited is apportioning blame between the various parties. The boom and bust cycle over the years has also increased costs as expertise is lost.

== See also ==
- Campaign to Bring Back British Rail
- Carbon neutrality
- Committee on Climate Change
- Decarbonisation measures in proposed UK electricity market reform
- Electric battery
- Extinction Rebellion
- Fossil fuel phase-out
- High Speed 2
- History of rail transport in Great Britain 1995 to date
- Hydrogen economy
- List of proposed railway electrification routes in Great Britain
- Low-carbon economy
- North West England electrification schemes
- Overhead line
- Railway electrification in Scotland
- United Kingdom Climate Change Programme
