= Network Rail Control Periods =

Financial planning periods of Network Rail

Network Rail Control Periods are the 5-year timespans into which Network Rail, the owner and operator of most of the rail infrastructure in Great Britain, works for financial and other planning purposes. Each Control Period begins on 1 April and ends on 31 March to coincide with the financial year. These periods were inherited from Railtrack, so that the earlier ones are retrospective.

As Network Rail is responsible for developing and maintaining railway infrastructure, the Control Periods are used to decide priorities for investment.

== Railtrack Control Periods ==
The first two control periods began while rail infrastructure in Britain was owned and operated by Railtrack, with Control Period 1 (CP1) spanning 1995–1999, while Control Period 2 (CP2) spanned 1999–2004, crossing the transformation of Railtrack into Network Rail in 2002.

== Network Rail Control Periods ==
=== Control Period 3 (CP3): 2004–2009 ===
CP3 included the following work:

- Additional express services from Edinburgh to Aberdeen
- Improved interchange at Gourock

=== Control Period 4 (CP4): 2009–2014 ===
CP4 included the following work as part of the Enhancements Programme:

- Airdrie–Bathgate rail link
- Electrification of the Liverpool to Manchester northern route
- Electrification of the Liverpool–Wigan line between Huyton Junction and Wigan North Western
- Electrification of the Manchester–Preston line (via Bolton) and the Blackpool branch lines between Preston and Blackpool North. As a spin off the branch line between Bolton and Wigan North Western is also due to be electrified
- Electrification of the Windermere branch line
- Redevelopment of Edinburgh Waverley station
- Redevelopment of Birmingham New Street station (Gateway Plus)
- Redevelopment of King's Cross station
- Redevelopment of Reading station
- The Thameslink Programme

=== Control Period 5 (CP5): 2014–2019 ===
CP5 includes:

- London Bridge station redevelopment
- Completion of Borders Railway
- East West Rail from Oxford to Bedford or Milton Keynes Central via Bletchley [this plan was first deferred to CP6 and, in December 2017, transferred to a private sector company to build and operate].
- Electrification from London Paddington to Bristol, Cardiff, Oxford and Newbury
- Electrification from Bedford to Kettering and Corby
- Electrification of Transpennine line from Manchester to Leeds
- Electrification of the Gospel Oak to Barking line
- Electrification of Leeds - York and Selby lines
- Electrification and station redevelopment Bromsgrove railway station
- Reading, Ascot to Waterloo 10-car platform lengthening.
- The Streatham Resignalling Project (As a part of the Victoria Phase II Project)
- The Sutton-Wimbledon Project (As a part of the Victoria Phase II Project)

CP5 ran over budget and some projects were delayed. In July 2015, Sir Peter Hendy was appointed Chairman of Network Rail "and asked by the Secretary of State to conduct a thorough review of the enhancement programme in England & Wales to see what can be delivered in an affordable and timely way within the funding period to 2019". (Table 37 of the report lists the revised work programme for CP5). Additionally, Dame Colette Bowe investigated how future investment programmes could be implemented better.

=== Control Period 6 (CP6): 2019–2024 ===
In July 2017, the Department for Transport published the "high level output specification" for Control Period 6.

In October 2017, a Statement of Funds Available report was published which announced that £48 billion would be allocated for CP6. In October 2018, the Office of Rail Regulation approved of the spending plans which include spending £7.7bn on spending of maintaining the existing railway and £16.6bn for renewing the railways .

In February 2018, Network Rail announced its strategic business plan for CP6; the plan will prioritize performance and reliability improvements over major new schemes.

In February 2019, Network Rail approved of its spending plan and had no objections to the ORR's decision on spending. It would publish its spending plan at the end of March 2019.

In September 2019, Network Rail and the Department for Transport released the future of the Island Line, which include adding a new passing loop at Brading and upgrading Ryde pier and bring new trains to the Isle of Wight.

=== Control Period 7 (CP7): 2024–2029 ===
On 1 December 2022, the Transport Secretary published the High Level Output Statement for Control Period 7 and confirmed via the Statement of Funds Available that £44bn would be made available to Network Rail for that Control Period. As of the same date, Network Rail has not yet published its plan for Control Period 7, setting out the capital projects that it will deliver. However, the Transpennine North Upgrade project has previously confirmed that it will go into both Control Period 7 and Control Period 8.
