= East Midlands station =

East Midlands station may refer to two things in the East Midlands, England:

- East Midlands Hub railway station, a proposed but rejected station on the HS2 line
- East Midlands Parkway railway station on the Midland Main Line
