= Toton TMD =

Largest rail depot in the United Kingdom

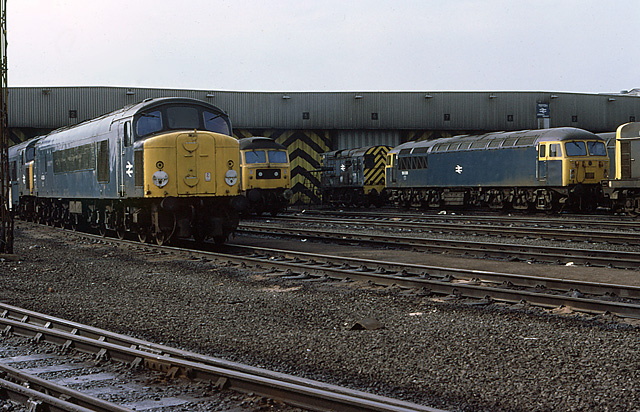
- Diesel locomotives on shed, during the BR era.
- Interactive map of Toton TMD

Location
- Location: Toton, Nottinghamshire, United Kingdom
- Coordinates: 52.9141°N 1.2806°W
- OS grid: SK484355

Characteristics
- Operator: DB Cargo UK
- Depot code: TO
- Type: Diesel

History
- Original: Midland Railway
- Pre-grouping: LMS
- Post-grouping: British Railways
- Former depot code: 18A (1948-1963); 16A (1963-1973)

Toton Traction Maintenance Depot or Toton Sidings is a large traction maintenance depot located in Toton, Nottinghamshire. The TOPS depot code for the depot is TO. Before TOPS, the shed code was 16A (18A prior to 1963).

Prior to the 2021 Integrated Rail Plan for the North and Midlands, the site was the proposed location of the East Midlands Hub railway station on the Leeds Branch of HS2.

== History ==
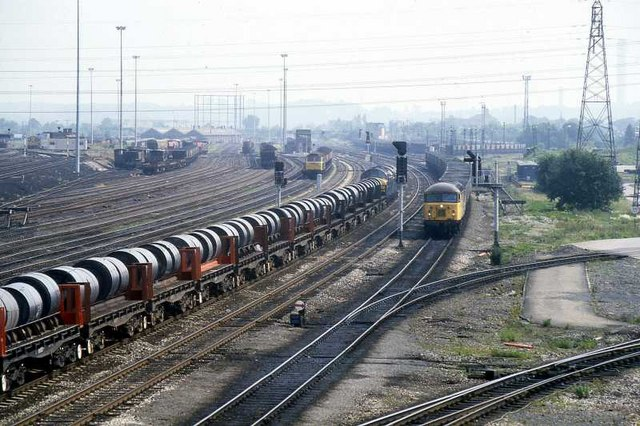
A classic mid-1980s shot of Toton, showing the Teesside Steelworks/Lackenby sidings – Corby Steelworks train on the up main line headed by a British Rail Class 37, whilst a British Rail Class 56 leaves the North Yard with coal empties on the second down goods line

Toton Sidings was originally developed in the 1850s, but owes much of its growth to the development of the coal industry in England. Located south of the Nottinghamshire and Derbyshire coalfield on the Trent-Chesterfield line, the site was ideal for sorting growing coal traffic. The Midland Railway had developed the Midland Main Line from the 1860s, and had a developing revenue from coal traffic from both the Yorkshire and Nottinghamshire coalfields to the power stations of the industrialised West Midlands. This traffic was added to by the fact that most towns also had their own gasworks, with coal delivered by rail to their own private sidings, and the rapidly developing domestic use of coal for heating and cooking.

With need to marshall coal traffic, a location close to the strategically located Trent Junction became obvious, and hence the development of Toton as a railway yard from the late 19th century. The sidings had two yards: the Up yard on the eastern side of the main lines, and the Down yard on the western side. The yards were nearly two miles long. The Up yard was used for sorting coal wagons going south, west and east. The Down yard was mainly used for empty coal wagons headed back north. There were five bypass lines: two southbound and three northbound. 1883 Toton dispatched 18,000 wagons in a summer month, and as many as 26,000 in a winter month. Locomotives and horses were used to move the wagons.

In 1901, the Down side was converted into a hump yard. The intake end of the Down side was further modernized in 1939. Diesel locomotives were used to hump the wagons, which went into one of four fans and thirty-five sorting sidings, depending on their destination. An operator in the Hump Room would set the first three sets of points electronically, but the remaining points were operated from the Control Tower. The Control Tower and the Hump Room communicated through teletypewriter. Four remotely-controlled railbrakes ensured wagons did not overspeed.

In 1950, the Up side was completely remodeled, adding ten arrival lines to accommodate waiting trains. The Up side was also a hump yard, although it had a shallower gradient than the Down side, as most of its wagons were loaded and therefore heavier. It had four fans and thirty-seven sorting sidings. The operator in the Hump Room could set all the points electronically. This allowed shunting into all four fans without a Control Tower present, while the Down side could only use two fans if the Control Tower was not staffed.

The yards eventually spanned: the Old/New Banks; North Yard and Meadow; East & West Yard; Sandiacre Ballast Sidings. Coal traffic reached its peak through the yards post World War II in the 1950s, with over 1million wagons per year passing through what was then the largest marshalling yard in Europe, and the third largest in the world. From 1939 to 1966, up to a million wagons were handled every year, with an average of 3,500 wagons every day. Local traffic included coal from Nottinghamshire, Derbyshire and South Yorkshire; as well as iron ore and steel from the nearby Stanton Ironworks. With the coming of the Beeching Axe, British Railways shelved all proposed development of any other marshalling yards, thereby increasing traffic through the yards further. This was the peak of Toton traffic, and at this time it was the largest marshalling yard in Europe and the third largest in the world.

In 1974, the Toton Diesel Maintenance Depot serviced about 400 main line locomotives and an additional 50 shunting locomotives. There were fifteen tracks in the depot, four of which were accessible from either end, with the other eleven accessible from the north. The tracks had elevated platforms and recessed floors to allow easy access to the locomotives. Employed at the Depot were 70 clerical and supervisory workers, as well as 440 workshop staff. They had a wheel profiling bay that allowed wheels to be reprofiled without being removed from the rolling stock.

By the 1970s the yard was in decline. With the introduction of Merry-go-round trains direct from colliery to power station, and the decline in the use of domestic coal in favour of North Sea gas, rail traffic through the yards was diminishing quickly. The Down Side ceased hump shunting in 1978, followed by the Up Side in 1984. Many of the yards were lifted during the 1970s and 1980s, and in the late 1980s the yards were rationalised to the basic shape seen today. This was the era when Toton TMD was the home of Class 20, Class 56 and Class 58.

== Present ==
=== Toton TMD ===
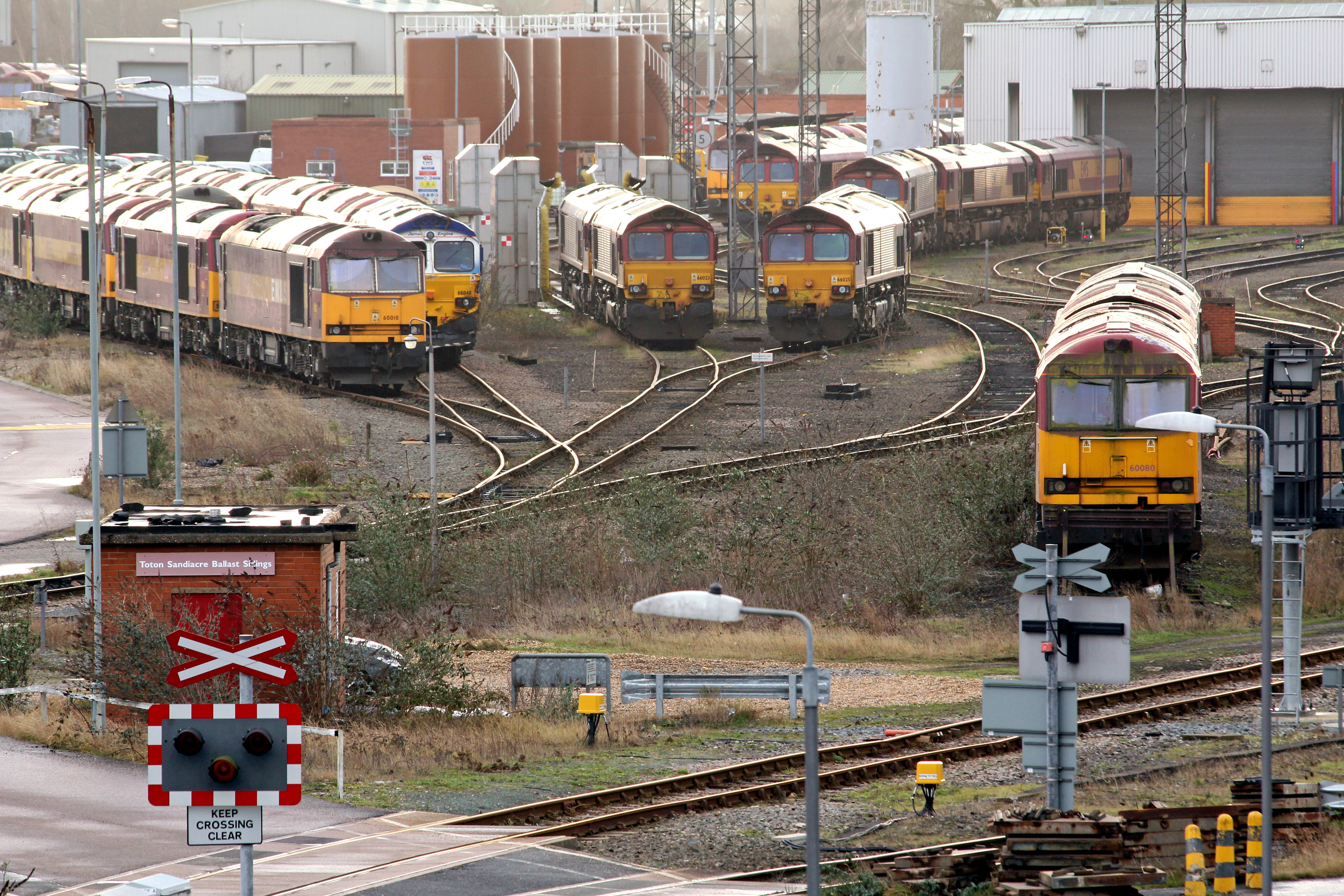
Toton TMD with Class 60 and Class 66s on shed

Since the privatisation of the UK rail network, Toton TMD has been operated by DB Cargo UK. As at 2021, it is home to the Class 60 and Class 66 diesel locomotives.

Changes in the maintenance of locomotives have also meant that Toton is now the only TMD within DB Cargo UK where heavy maintenance is carried out on locomotives. More recently a number of locos at Toton have been modified for use in France by fellow Deutsche Bahn subsidiary Euro Cargo Rail.

The traincrew depot has also declined as a result of the loss of traffic and now has a depot complement of 48 drivers (in 2010), which contrasts with the depot's complement on privatisation when around 170 drivers were based here.

=== Toton Marshalling Yards ===
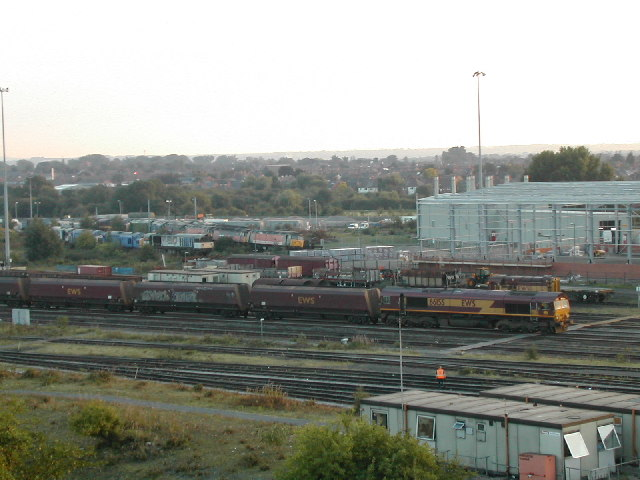
Toton "Down" sidings

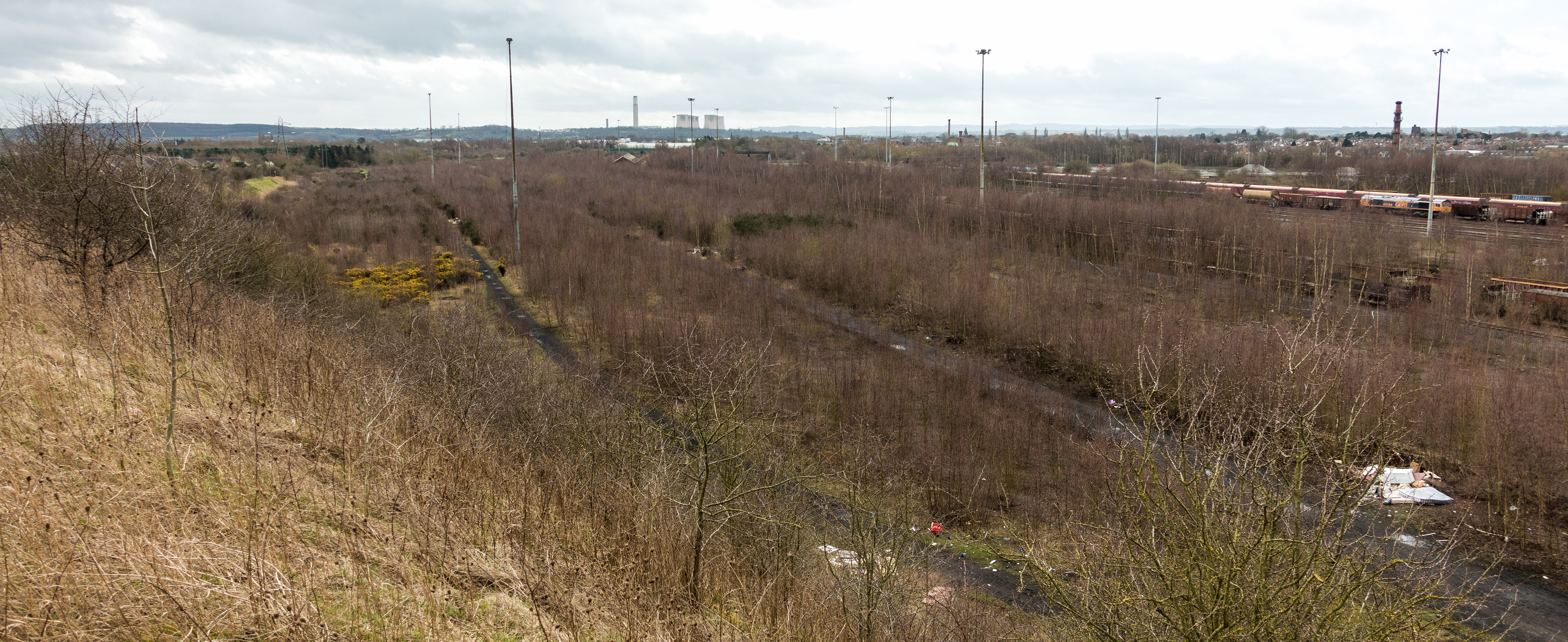
Toton "Up" sidings and the site of the marshalling yard. The proposed site of the High Speed 2 East Midlands Hub railway station.

The changes in traffic flows have meant changes in the way freight is handled by the yards at Toton, primarily because the great majority of the trains now originate from south of the yards and therefore have to be propelled into the North Yard. Following the remodelling of the 1970s and 1980s there is no connection directly into Toton Yards from the south.

From 2009 both the North Yard and the New Bank sidings became accessible from the south after the whole of the Toton area was re-signalled with a certain amount of remodelling also taking place. It is now also possible to depart south from the North Yard which, as its name would suggest, was designed for trains heading North.

Toton lost the last of its domestic coal traffic in the mid-2000s, when GB Railfreight took over transport originating from Daw Mill Colliery from EWS. This left the main traffic as: Domestic coal from Scotland via Milford; Coal imports from Immingham, Avonmouth and Liverpool docks for onward transit to Ratcliffe-on-Soar Power Station.

After the loss of these traffic sources once coal was excluded from UK power generation network, at 23:59 on 26 April 2009 the New Bank yard on the up side of the main lines (below the bank) was closed due to the economic situation and the associated decline in freight traffic. The mothballed yard will be used for storage of assets not currently in use, including locomotives (Class 60s) and wagons.

The main traffic now through the yard are rail infrastructure services for Network Rail, including weekend ballast and engineering trains.

There was discussion of redeveloping disused areas of Toton Sidings into the East Midlands hub for the High Speed 2 project.
