= Integrated Rail Plan =

Integrated-rail-plan-for-the-north-and-midlands

The Integrated Rail Plan for the North and Midlands, or more simply the Integrated Rail Plan (IRP), is a United Kingdom government proposal published on 18 November 2021. It aims to deliver "increased capacity, faster journeys or more frequent services on eight out of the top ten busiest rail corridors across the North and Midlands", by developing rail services along with the required infrastructure in these regions of England. It was published by the Department for Transport (DfT) and features forewords by Prime Minister Boris Johnson and Transport Secretary Grant Shapps, but its publication was delayed a number of times, partly because of the COVID-19 pandemic. It contains the significant proviso that "in line with the Government's existing approach to rail enhancements, commitments will be made only to progress individual schemes up to the next stage of development, subject to a review of their readiness".

The stated aim is to integrate several rail projects for existing main lines and some new ones, whilst driving down unnecessary costs and over-specification. These projects include, but are not limited to phase 2b of HS2, Northern Powerhouse Rail, the Transpennine Route Upgrade, the East Coast and Midland Main Line railway upgrades, the Midlands Rail Hub and the Traction Decarbonisation Network Strategy. It was published in an attempt to coordinate and sequence these and not unnecessarily duplicate work. However, the plan cancels several projects previously planned. Under the previous plans Leeds would have received two new high-speed lines, a southern HS2 one from London, Birmingham and the East Midlands, and an eastern Northern Powerhouse Rail one from Manchester. The new plan cuts off the Manchester line in the eastern Pennine foothills, and amputates the eastern leg of HS2 at Nottinghamshire's East Midlands Parkway. Instead of these new lines, the plan includes rail electrification and line speed improvements that will reduce journey times, but have only a small effect on increasing capacity.

The plan has not been well received by the board of Transport for the North, with concern being expressed that assessment of benefit concentrates only on reduced journey time for passengers and does not take into account the wider social and economic implications.

== Background ==
Transport for the North (TfN) was established in 2018 to make the case for strategic transport improvements across the North of England. It is the first statutory sub-national transport body in England and Wales. Transport for the North published a Strategic Transport Plan in February 2019. This fed into the National Infrastructure Commission (NIC) which is the executive agency responsible for providing expert advice to the UK Government on infrastructure.

TfN published a Strategic Transport Plan in February 2019. It aimed to encourage trade and inward investment by improving links to the North's ports and airports, and faster links between the economic assets that they serve. This was to make the North a more attractive place for businesses to base themselves and to support the North's visitor and tourism economy. It also said that

Over the last two decades, the North’s railway has experienced substantial growth in passenger numbers despite a legacy of underinvestment. Much of that growth has been accommodated within pre-existing capacity, but this is no longer possible on many routes, and most of the North’s key rail hubs are now at capacity. The North’s rail network lacks sufficient capacity for growth and is severely constrained by on-train congestion, low journey speeds and poor punctuality.

The IRP states that some lines will be upgraded by electrification, digital signalling, updated overhead wiring and include lengthening of trains. Also, some new lines will be built and share high speed track, curtailing sections of HS2. During a debate in the House of Lords on 16 December 2021, Transport Minister Baroness Vere said that "This is a plan, and there is an enormous amount of work to do to move from the plan to the next level down – to the detail about how this will actually work on the ground. While in some places we can be very clear about what capacity improvements will be available, in others there will be an enormous amount of designing to do and engineering options to look at, particularly when it comes to upgrading lines." The budget of the plan is £96 billion, although £42 billion of this had already been committed for HS2 Phases 1 and 2a between London, the West Midlands and Crewe.

In August 2019, the Department for Transport commissioned Oakervee Review of High Speed 2 (HS2), which was published in February 2020. It concluded that HS2 should be built, in full, with a couple of changes to reduce cost. It pointed out that "the primary need is for capacity; speed although an important factor in economic benefits should not be in and of itself the primary driver of decision making". Its terms of reference had asked about possible economies from different choices or phasing of HS2 Phase 2b, taking account of the interfaces with Northern Powerhouse Rail It concluded that there were opportunities to remove "gold-plating" and "over-specification".

In December 2020, the National Infrastructure Commission's "Rail Needs Assessment for the Midlands and the North - Final report" was published. This concluded that

Rail has the potential to contribute to economic transformation in the Midlands and the North. To give rail the best chance of doing so, investment must be concentrated and at scale, and form part of a wider economic strategy including skills, development and urban transport. This includes giving city leaders the powers and funding to develop long term strategies for improving urban transport, which can bring benefits faster than major intercity rail. To support government’s decision, the Commission has developed a menu of options for a programme of rail investments in the Midlands and the North, using three different illustrative budget options (baseline, plus 25 per cent and plus 50 per cent):

- focussing on upgrades (baseline budget only)
- prioritising regional links
- prioritising long distance links.

The package focussing on upgrades is unlikely to be sufficient to support levelling up. Prioritising regional links appears to have the highest potential economic benefits overall for cities in the Midlands and the North.

The government's view as stated in the IRP, was that the cost of the full "baseline + 25%" option at £108bn is not affordable but it could afford more than the £86bn cost of the budget option. It promises £96bn (baseline + 12%), although only £42bn of this is money not previously allocated.

A Technical Annexe was published in January 2022. A correction slip was issued March 2022.

== Details ==
=== HS2 ===
The document specifies that HS2 will be built from Crewe to Manchester, and from Birmingham to East Midlands Parkway, but not from the East Midlands to Leeds. It thus significantly alters the previous HS2 programme, including curtailing much of the eastern leg and reducing HS2 to a main high speed spine, from London via Birmingham to the North West of England – to a point south of Wigan. There will be branches onto existing conventional lines in the Midlands and the North West. There are no branches to Southern England destinations. HS2 will then parallel the conventional West Coast Main Line with connecting branches to it at four points. HS2 below Birmingham is flanked by the Chiltern Line and West Coast Main Line.

Nine stations will be served directly by HS2 track, with most destinations using HS2 track, being off the spine. The stations served directly by HS2 track are:

1. London Euston;
2. Old Oak Common;
3. Birmingham airport;
4. Birmingham Curzon Street;
5. East Midlands Parkway;
6. Warrington Bank Quay Low Level;
7. Manchester Airport High Speed (depending on private funding);
8. Manchester Piccadilly;
9. Wigan North Western.

==== Additions and omissions to HS2 ====
A number of electrification schemes are referred to in the IRP. Full electrification and upgrading of the Transpennine Main Line between Manchester, Leeds and York are specified, as is the Leeds to Bradford via New Pudsey line. The plan gives full digital signal upgrades to the Midland Main Line and East Coast Main Line (ECML), with the electrification of the Midland Main Line to Derby, Nottingham and Sheffield. The ECML will have 140 mph (230 km/h) operation in some sections. Newcastle, Leeds and Sheffield will use these lines to London instead of HS2. These cities will use the section of HS2 from East Midland Parkway to Birmingham, to access Birmingham. Emphasis is placed on improved journey times, but the timings given in the plan are said to be unduly optimistic according to one authoritative source. The plan adds the centres of Warrington, Derby and Nottingham to HS2. The existing stations at Derby and Nottingham will be served by HS2 trains entering the cities on conventional tracks from East Midlands Parkway. A link is introduced from HS2 to Liverpool via a section of new HS2 line from the reinstated low-level platforms at Warrington Bank Quay and onwards via upgraded sections of the St Helens and Runcorn Gap Railway to Ditton junction where it joins the current line to Liverpool Lime Street. NPR and HS2 will share a west to east speed-limiting, curvaceous, high-speed track from Warrington to Manchester through Millington, where there will be a junction with the HS2 line to the south.

The Liverpool to Birmingham route was omitted from the initial HS2 plan, which the IRP maintains. Leeds and Newcastle are to have reduced journey times to London and Birmingham using the conventional East Coast Main Line. The plan does not provide for trains operating between London and the large cities of Leeds, Sheffield and Newcastle using HS2. These cities will use the upgraded Midland Main Line and the East Coast Main Line, with Leeds and Newcastle having longer journey times to London than with the previous HS2 proposal, and Sheffield equalling HS2 journey times. However, Leeds, Newcastle and Sheffield will use the HS2 section from East Midland Parkway station to for services to Birmingham.

The main losers from the changes are those to the east of the Pennines in Yorkshire and beyond. Despite the notional emphasis on increased capacity, the metrics in the plan are mostly about journey time, and the section on freight is relatively brief. An example of the lack of detail on capacity increases is the statement "If a third track is delivered between Huddersfield and Marsden in the first phase of NPR, then it would be possible to introduce an hourly off-peak freight path before the rest of the NPR infrastructure and services are in place". The typical journey time between London and Leeds is given as improving from 133 minutes to 113 minutes compared to the full HS3 time of 81 minutes, the time between London and Sheffield is given as improved from 116 minutes to 87 minutes, and between London and York from 112 minutes to 98 minutes. The capacity of the routes will not be improved to the extent that would have been the case under the previous plan. Newcastle, Liverpool and Hull also miss out. Currently the Birmingham to Newcastle journey time is given as 206 minutes with an improvement only to 167 minutes compared to 117 minutes under the full HS3 scheme. Liverpool currently has parity with adjacent Manchester in journey times to London, the two cities being equidistant from it. The initial HS2 plan put Liverpool about half an hour slower to London than Manchester. The new plan shows a current time from London to Liverpool as being 132 minutes. The HS3 plan quoted 94 minutes, and under IRP 92 minutes, a small improvement. The plan states that other schemes such as further electrification to Hull will depend on the results of work on how best to take HS3 services to Leeds.

=== Northern Powerhouse Rail ===
The first full description of Northern Powerhouse Rail is included in the document. A new high speed line is specified east from Manchester to Marsden, which is just over the border into Yorkshire, at the eastern end of the Standedge tunnels. At Marsden it is to join the Transpennine line to Leeds and destinations beyond. The plans involve building less high-speed rail than was previously proposed. It does not meet the aspirations of Transport for the North for a high speed line from Manchester to Leeds via Bradford or for much improved freight services, but it does commit to electrifying all of the line from Manchester to Leeds and on to York. A link is to be introduced from HS2 to Liverpool via a section of new HS2 line from the reinstated low-level platforms at Warrington Bank Quay and onwards via upgraded sections of the St Helens and Runcorn Gap Railway to Ditton junction where it joins the current line to Liverpool Lime Street. NPR and HS2 will share a west to east speed-limiting, curvaceous, high-speed track from Warrington to Manchester through Millington, where there will be a junction with the HS2 line to the south.

The whole of the £9bn to £11.5bn Transpennine Route Upgrade has been defined as "Phase One" of Northern Powerhouse Rail with a projected completion date of between 2036 and 2041.

== Consequences, controversy and the future ==
The Board of Transport for the North immediately expressed anger and disappointment at the IRP, but also said that they wished to work with the government. They sent a strongly worded letter demanding to see the data that led to the decisions. They laid out a number of criticisms that:

- the plan would not deliver the long-term changes needed to level up the North's economy;
- sharing capacity between inter-city, regional, local and freight services produces substantial operational problems and risks;
- the plan would only provide eight fast trains per hour between Leeds and Manchester compared with the twelve provided by TfN's preferred option.
- the proposed line upgrades would cause much greater disruption than constructing new lines;
- as the seventh most populous local authority area in England, Bradford would continue to have no direct rail access to Liverpool, Sheffield, Newcastle, Hull or Manchester Airport;
- as a key destination, Liverpool has insufficient capacity with just Lime Street Station;
- the limitation of six trains per hour on the East Coast Main Line could be removed by re-opening the mothballed Leamside line;
- electrification should be reinstated as part of improved East West decarbonised freight and passenger connectivity;
- the importance of connectivity being improved between (a) Sheffield and Leeds; (b) Sheffield and Manchester; (c) Sheffield and Hull; (d) Leeds and Hull; (e) and that Hull and the East Riding are reconnected to the Transpennine Main Line.

One of the first direct consequences of the plan is that Transport for the North was stripped of its authority over Northern Powerhouse Rail with control transferring to the Department for Transport (DfT). This resulted in accusations of a power grab by central government. In defence, the government said that £96 billion was still being spent on the plan and further claimed it was a record. The shadow transport secretary at the time Jim McMahon called it the 'Great Train Robbery". Steve Rotheram and Andy Burnham, the metro mayors of the Liverpool City Region and Greater Manchester were among those who were extremely critical of the plan. The Labour Shadow Chancellor Rachel Reeves said the paring back of Northern Powerhouse Rail was even more damaging than the axing of HS2 eastern leg. Transport Secretary Grant Shapps said the criticism was wrong and unfair. Further controversy ensued when it was revealed the majority of civil servants who wrote the report don't live in the North or the Midlands. The government admitted that the plan produced by TfN would have had better outcomes but was not affordable.

The reaction from the rail industry and the rail industry press was scathing. Nigel Harris, managing editor of RAIL Magazine, called it an act of political spinelessness and stated it created a new East-West Divide in the country. He further accused the government of selling the public total lies. When the government claimed that the Leeds railway station upgrade was part of the IRP, Harris interviewed by The Independent said that it was not government spin but dishonesty. RAIL Magazine reported variously that the plan was widely condemned by industry, regions and MPs. In January 2022, Harris further called Shapps and the DfT liars and said the lying and claims were shameful, dangerous, enormously damaging and could not be allowed to continue. Alan Williams, writing in Modern Railways, called it the disintegrated rail plan with Northern England railing against it. Others even used the word "insulting" about the claim that the Midland Main Line electrification was being sped up as a result of the IRP.

Former secretary of state for transport Patrick McLoughlin was appointed chair of Transport for North in January 2022 and said in his new role he would push for reinstatement of Northern Powerhouse Rail in full into the IRP. The issue was raised by a number of people after it was admitted that the plans had been scaled back despite lack of proper economic analysis. The Transport Select Committee began a series of enquiries starting on 2 February 2022. Andy Burnham appearing as one witness stated the plan would leave the North with second best trains for 200 years. However, Network Rail CEO Andrew Haines called the criticism of the plan profoundly unhelpful. Writing about the Transport Select Committee meeting on 2 February 2022, Nigel Harris further stated that the atmosphere was "Sour, irrelevant and patronising and no way for the important TSC to do its job". This was in regard to Karl McCartney suggesting the north was "biting the hand that fed it" regarding criticism of the IRP. On 7 February a selection of northern city mayors wrote a letter to Prime Minister Boris Johnson, Levelling Up Secretary Michael Gove and Transport Secretary Grant Shapps reaffirming their dissatisfaction at the IRP.

On 26 July 2022, the Transport Select Committee met and published a report urging the government to revisit the IRP. In particular the Government was urged not to fixate on journey times as a benefit of the IRP. Track capacity is key, and the Department for Transport was recommended to commission a full independent assessment of the seat and track capacity offered by the IRP. A government response was published in July 2023.

== Maps relevant to IRP ==
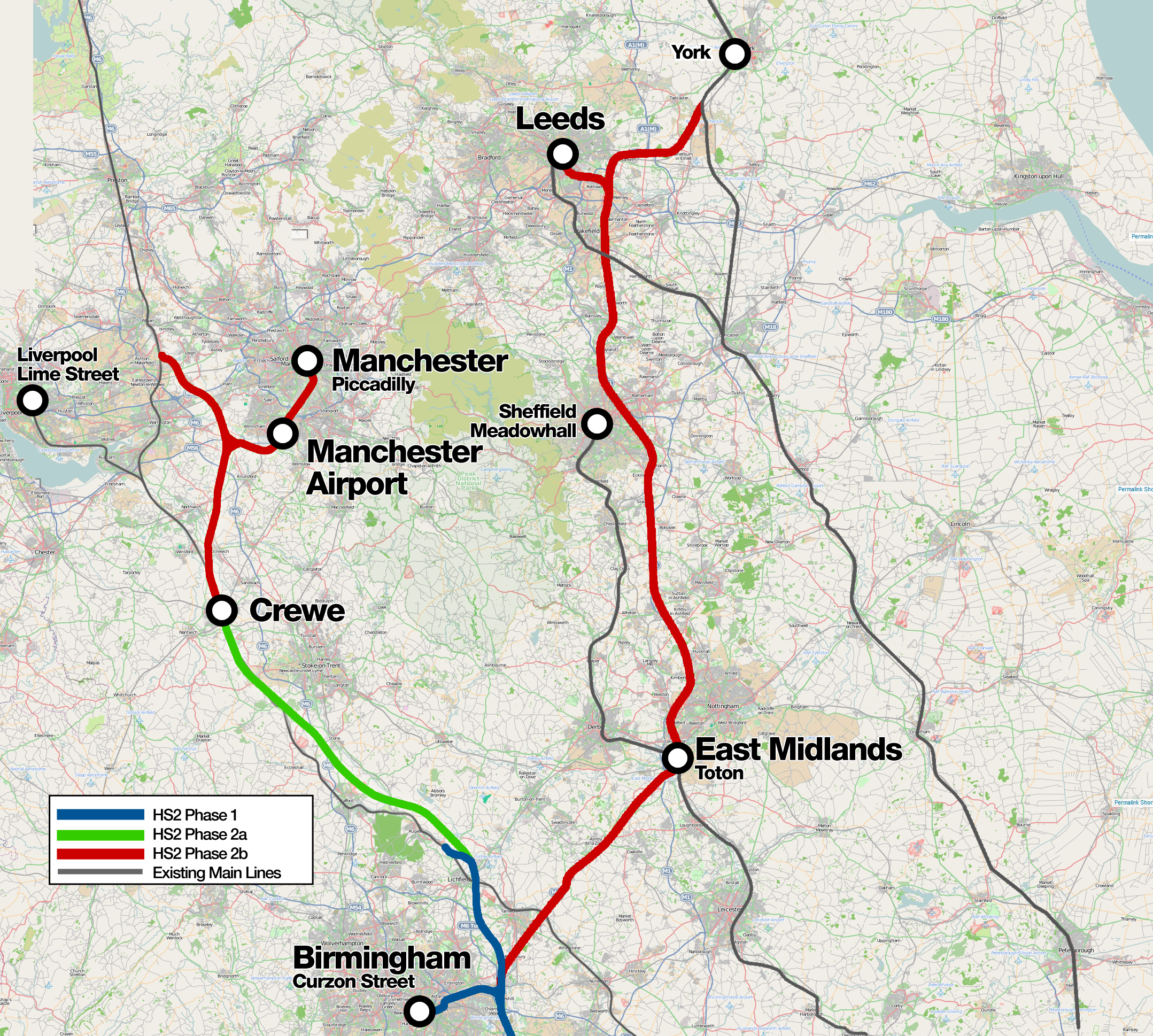
Original HS2 phase 2 plan pre-IRP.

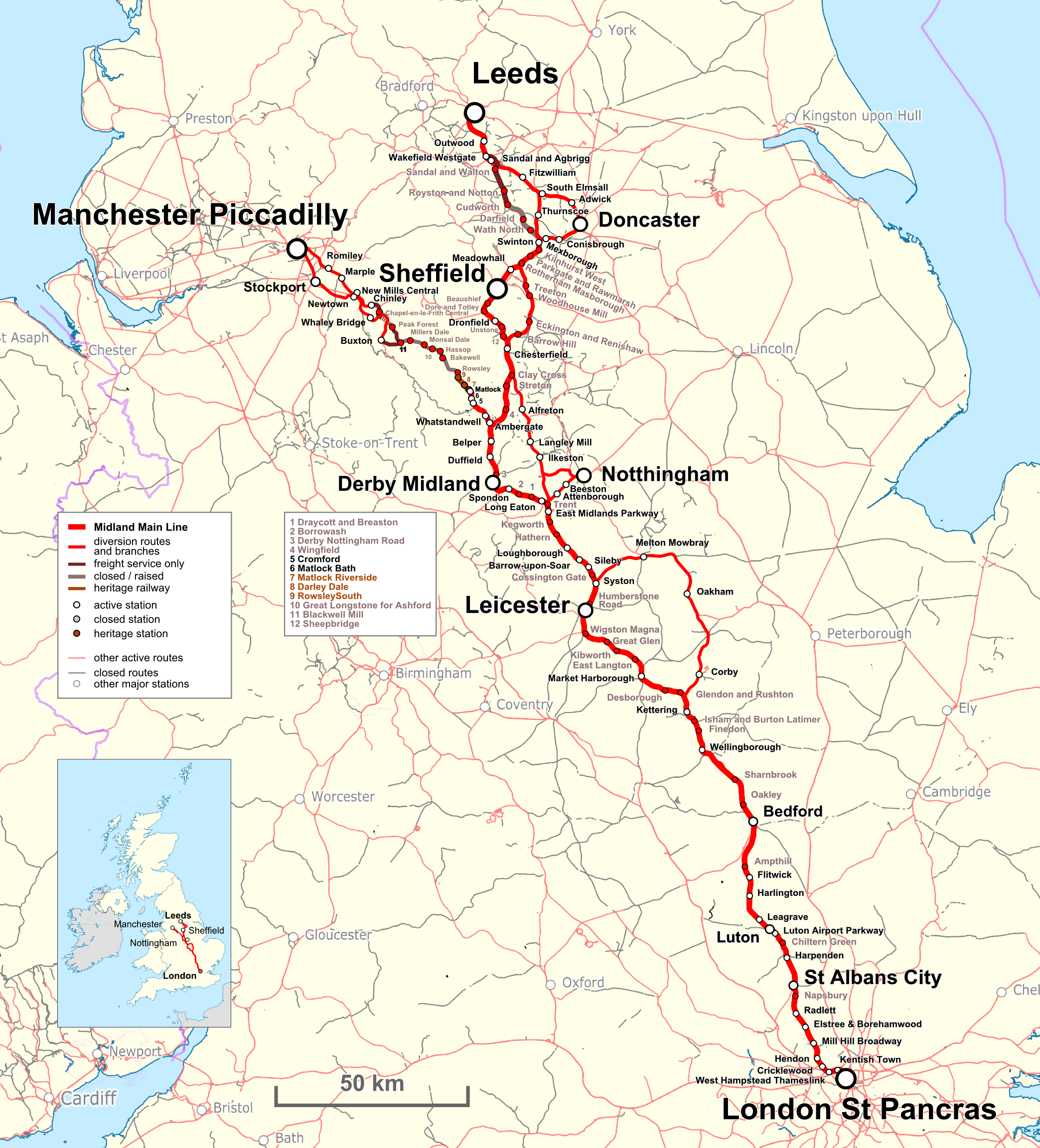
Midland Main Line Map.

Map of the Trans-Pennine Routes.

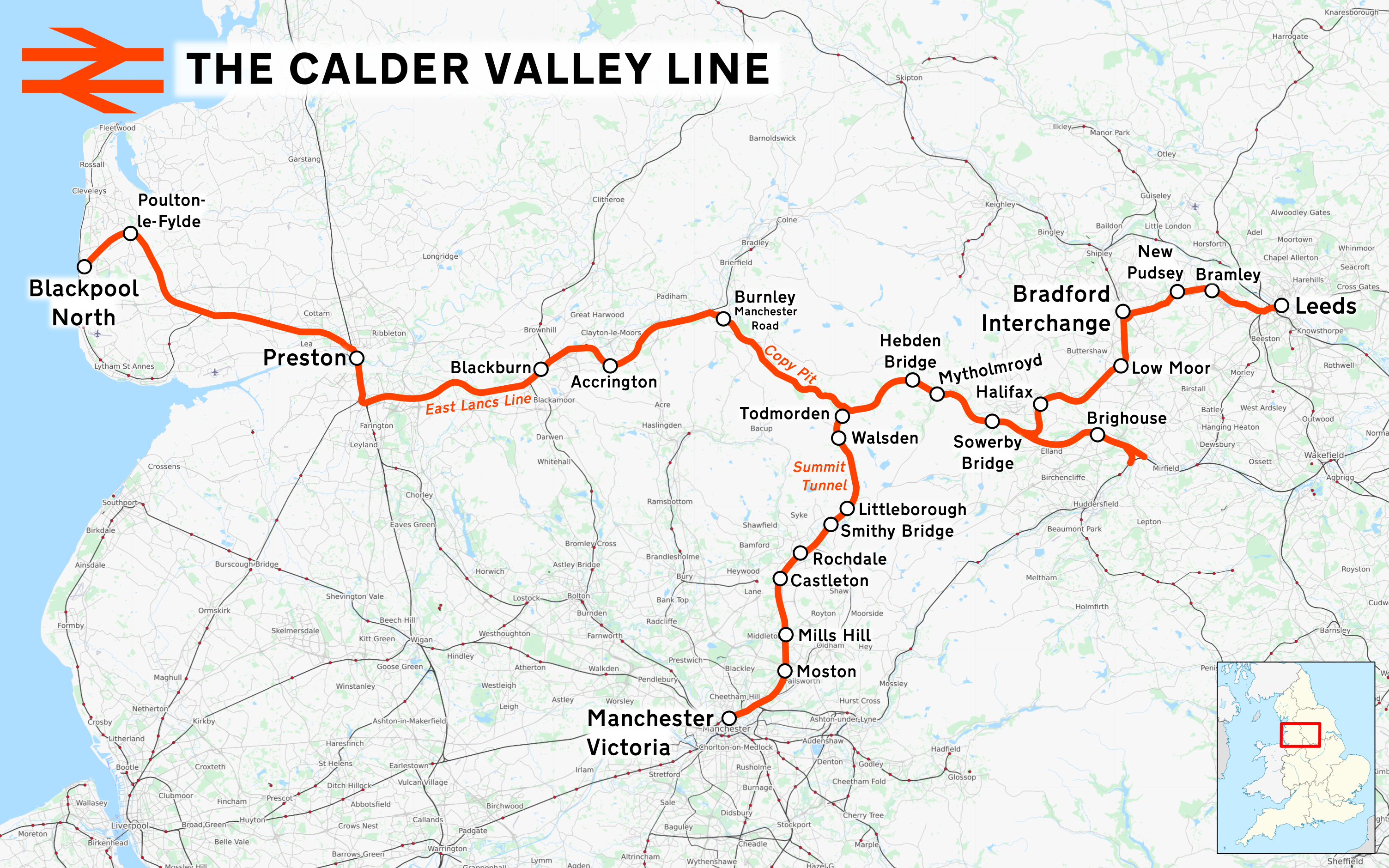
Calder Valley line - only Leeds-Bradford Interchange relates to IRP.

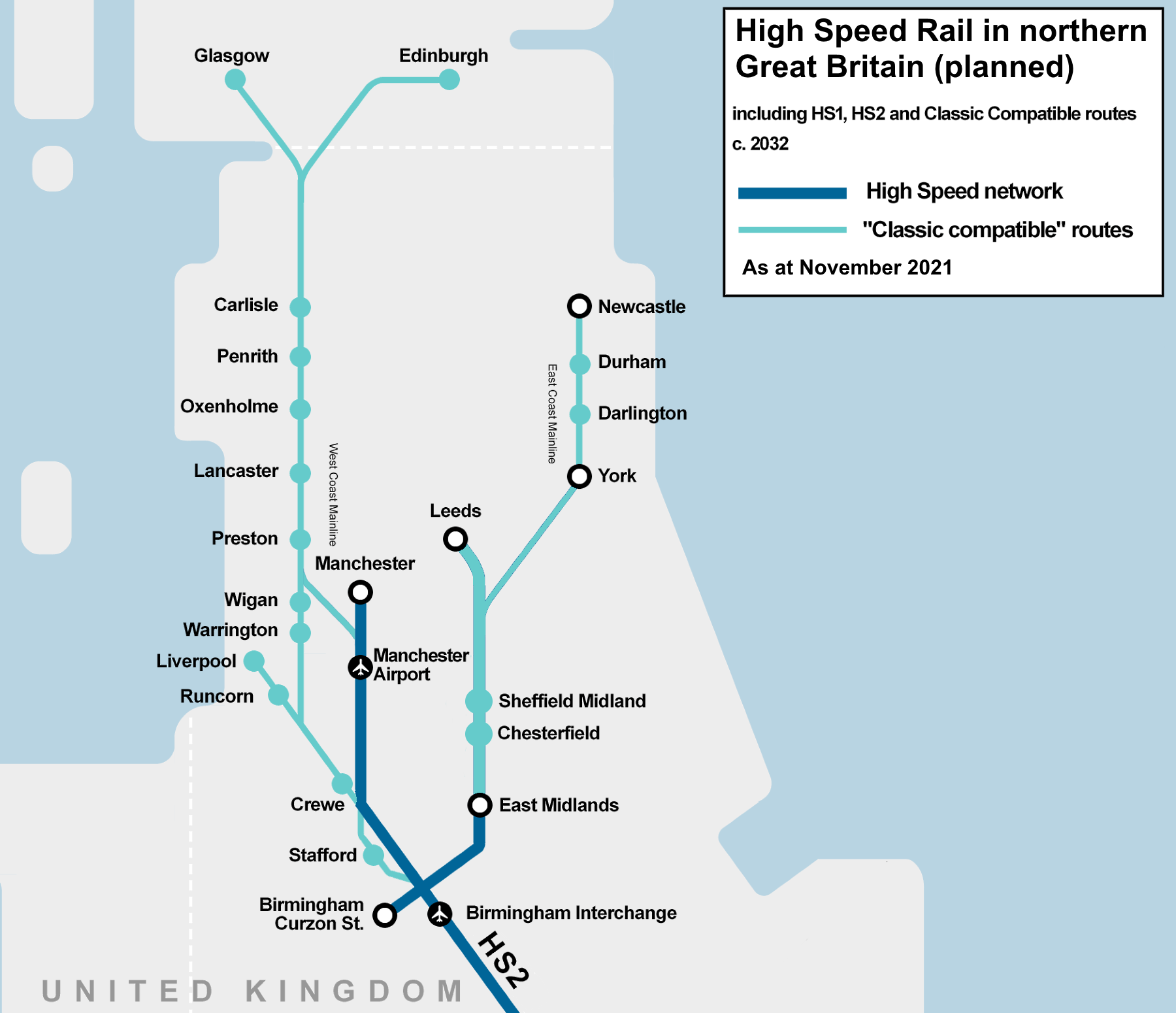
HS2 classic network UK north POST IRP.

== See also ==
- History of rail transport in Great Britain 1995 to date
- Railway electrification in Great Britain
