= East Midlands Hub railway station =

Formerly-proposed station on High Speed 2

East Midlands Hub
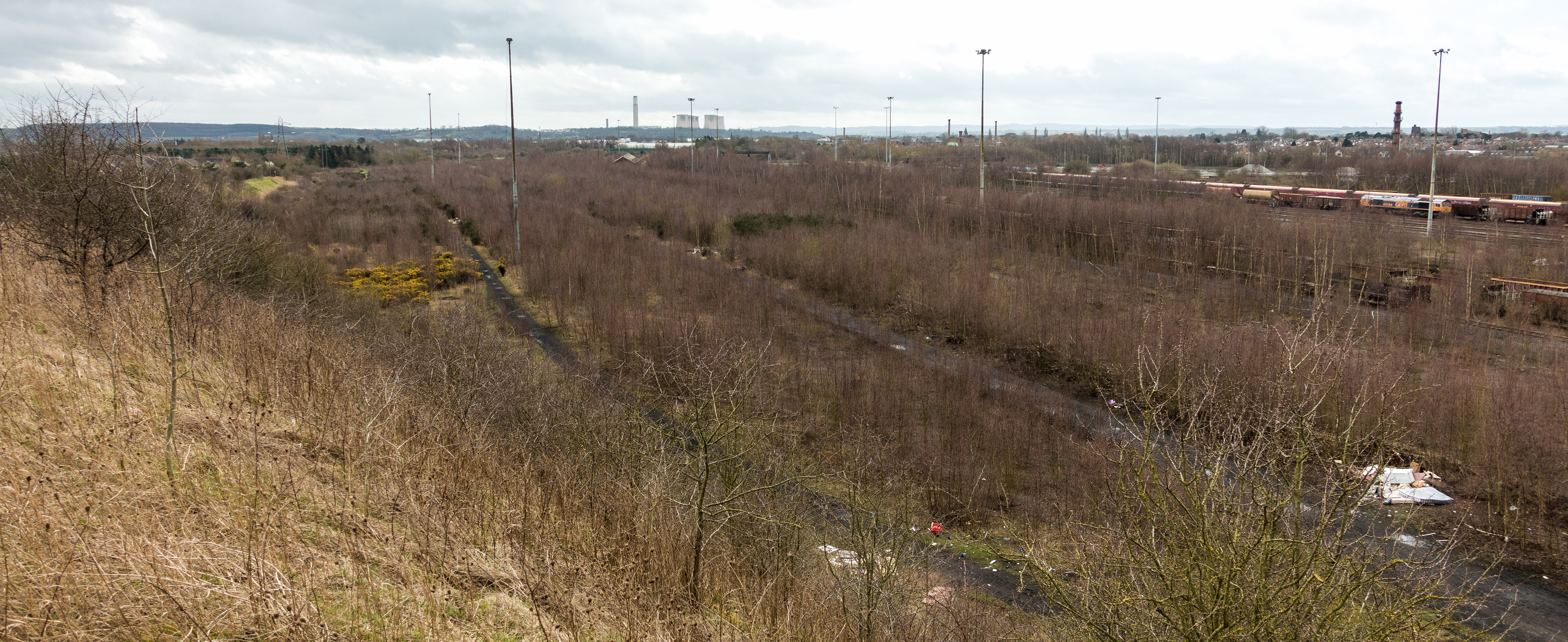
- Toton Sidings, the proposed site of the station.

General information
- Location: Toton, Broxtowe; England
- Coordinates: 52.9141°N 1.2806°W
- Managed by: Network Rail
- Platforms: 8
Location

East Midlands Hub was a planned new railway station on the Leeds Branch of High Speed 2. It was intended to be located on the existing railway sidings in Toton, situated between Nottingham and Derby. The station would have been located adjacent to the M1 motorway in Nottinghamshire, on the border with Derbyshire.

After a sifting process, High Speed Two Limited offered a shortlist of East Midlands options consisting of this site or the expansion of the existing Derby railway station, with the government stating its preference for a station at Toton in January 2013. The Toton plans are supported by Nottingham City Council, whereas Derby City Council would prefer the station to be sited at Derby railway station and Rushcliffe Borough Council support the expansion of the existing East Midlands Parkway station.

In early October 2014, reports emerged that the preferred location for the East Midlands Hub station had been relocated to Breaston, 2-3 kilometres south-west of Toton. By July 2015 High Speed Two Limited confirmed they were not considering the Breaston site and that their preferred location for the station was at Toton. In November 2016 Phase 2b was approved by the Government.

Plans for the station were officially scrapped in November 2021 when the government announced that HS2 would terminate at East Midlands Parkway station and not continue north to Leeds and York.

== Background ==
In 2009, the Labour Government created High Speed Two (HS2) Limited to examine the prospect of further high-speed rail in the United Kingdom. Later in 2010, the Coalition Government confirmed there would be a terminus in both Leeds and Manchester. In January 2013 the final route was announced with a new station being proposed for Leeds and a new station adjacent to Piccadilly station for the terminus in Manchester. Both Leeds and Manchester were to have junctions to the south of the cities allowing for connections to the East Coast Main Line and the West Coast Main Line respectively. The East Midlands Hub station was announced at the same time and would be on the Leeds branch of HS2, between Birmingham and Sheffield.

== Proposal ==
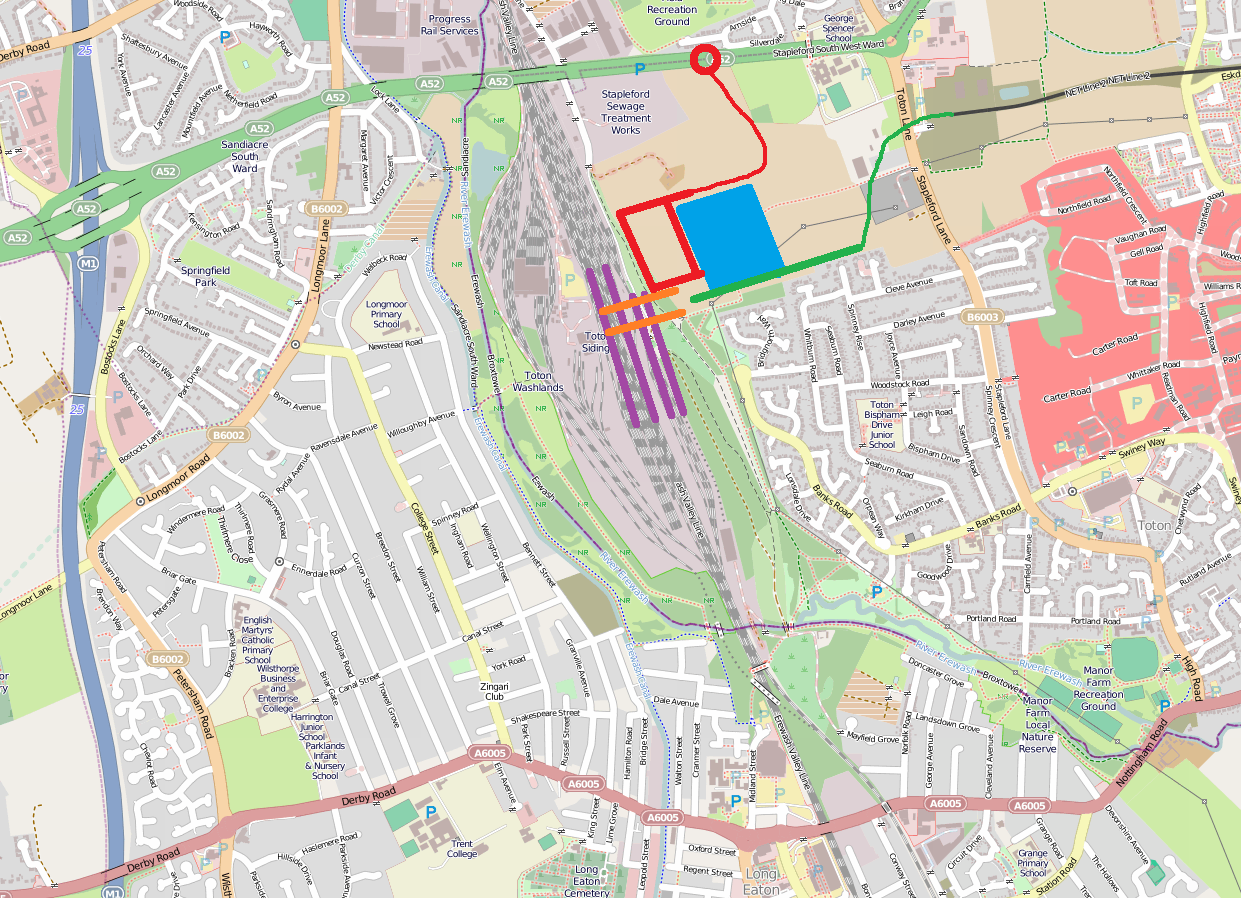
Proposed layout of the East Midlands Hub station at Toton.

The station would be a newly constructed site making use of existing railway land at Toton sidings. The proposals provide for a total of eight platforms, four of which would be for high-speed rail services and four for local and regional services. Two high-speed through lines would also be provided for services not stopping at the East Midlands Hub. The platforms would be constructed at ground level, with the station entrance and forecourt built at a higher elevation to the east. The site lies on designated green belt land, but is almost entirely surrounded by urban areas. The station is sited on existing railway land. Construction time of the station itself is estimated at five years, with services to be tested in 2031 and running by 2032/33.

== Alternatives ==
The government selected the East Midlands Hub station at Toton as it was the "best of all the options HS2 Ltd developed for serving the East Midlands market as a whole". It offers approx. 175 acres (70 ha) including existing companies on the site. The main alternative considered was for an HS2 station to be developed as part of the existing Derby station. High Speed Two Limited stated that this proposal would see a drop in the number of passengers travelling to and from Nottingham (and the wider area) and that £190 million of additional fare revenue could be made from the Toton Hub proposal when compared with a Derby-based HS2 station. In their consultation document, High Speed Two Limited stated that the Toton hub station could attract three-quarters of London-bound passengers from Derby and four-fifths of those from Nottingham.

In July 2013 Derby City Council put forward plans to route HS2 through Derby via Swadlincote and near to Belper, arguing that the route would be shorter and cheaper to construct. Council leader Cllr Paul Bayliss stated "It's not a secret we've been looking at HS2 having a station in Derby rather in some place called Toton". These plans are opposed by Nottingham City Council, which stated it would prepare a study to describe why Toton would be the best option.

In addition to the plans to locate an HS2 station in Derby, consideration was given to constructing the line through East Midlands Parkway and upgrading the existing station there. This would result in the line taking a different, more expensive route and High Speed Two Limited concluded that even with the cost of adding new connecting services to Toton factored in, a Toton station would be cheaper to build than an HS2 station at East Midlands Parkway. The green belt designation of the land at East Midlands Parkway was also felt to be a significant planning constraint that the Toton site was not subject to. Despite this, the plan to construct via East Midlands Parkway was supported by two councillors representing the borough of Rushcliffe, who claimed the East Midlands Parkway site would retain good access to road links in the area whilst benefiting from a connection to the existing rail network. Routing HS2 via East Midlands Parkway was later formally supported by Rushcliffe Borough Council after a meeting in December 2013.

=== Relocation to Breaston ===
On 8 October 2014, reports emerged that High Speed Two Limited were considering moving the station 2-3 kilometres south-west from Toton into Breaston, Derbyshire, to the west of the M1 motorway. Consideration of the new station location was reported to be driven by reduced costs of the new alignment (as a result of not needing to tunnel the line under East Midlands Airport) and easier connections to the existing rail lines between Derby and Nottingham. By July 2015 High Speed Two Limited stated that Breaston was no longer being considered and that the preferred site was at Toton.

== Cancellation ==
In the Integrated Rail Plan for the North and Midlands published on 18 November 2021, the government announced updated plans for High Speed 2 Phase Two that involved the eastern leg to Leeds being scaled back with high-speed track from the south terminating at East Midlands Parkway and trains north of the station using existing track. The East Midlands Hub station would not be constructed and high-speed services would instead call at East Midlands Parkway. Those plans were then scrapped when the entirety of High Speed 2 Phase Two, including the remaining section of the eastern leg, was cancelled in October 2023.

== Transport ==
Location of the proposed station in Nottinghamshire.

=== Road ===
The proposed site sits close to Long Eaton and is approximately one mile (2 km) away from junction 25 of the M1 motorway, where it intersects with the A52 dual-carriageway (Brian Clough Way) that links Derby and Nottingham. To the south of the site and the opposite side of the Trent River is the A453 which leads from Nottingham to East Midlands Airport and to the south-west Via A52 and M1 is the A50 connecting junction 24A of the M1 to Stoke-upon-Trent. The proposed site would include car parking and a new, dedicated connection to the A52. A bus rapid transit was planned for completion prior to the station opening and would have, alongside a new Nottingham Express Transit line, connected the station to Derby. New bus services were also planned to connect additional settlements to the station.

=== Cycling ===
The proposed site is within 50 metres of the Erewash Valley trail, which connects towns and villages within the Erewash Valley. It is 500 metres from route 6 of the Derby-Nottingham section of the National Cycle Network.

=== Rail ===
The proposed station would have been served by a dedicated rail service connecting it to stations in Derby, Leicester and Nottingham along with other significant stations in the region, including the East Midlands Parkway railway station which is approximately 5 kilometres south of the Toton site. Nottingham Express Transit opened an extension to the park & ride system at Toton in 2015. An extension, planned for completion by 2040, would have seen the line extended to Derby with an interchange at East Midlands Hub.

=== Air ===
The proposed site is approximately 10 kilometres north-east of East Midlands Airport. A railway station at the airport was expected to be complete by 2040. This would have provided direct services to East Midlands Hub and onward to nearby cities.
