= East Midlands Parkway railway station =

Railway station in Nottinghamshire, England

East Midlands Parkway
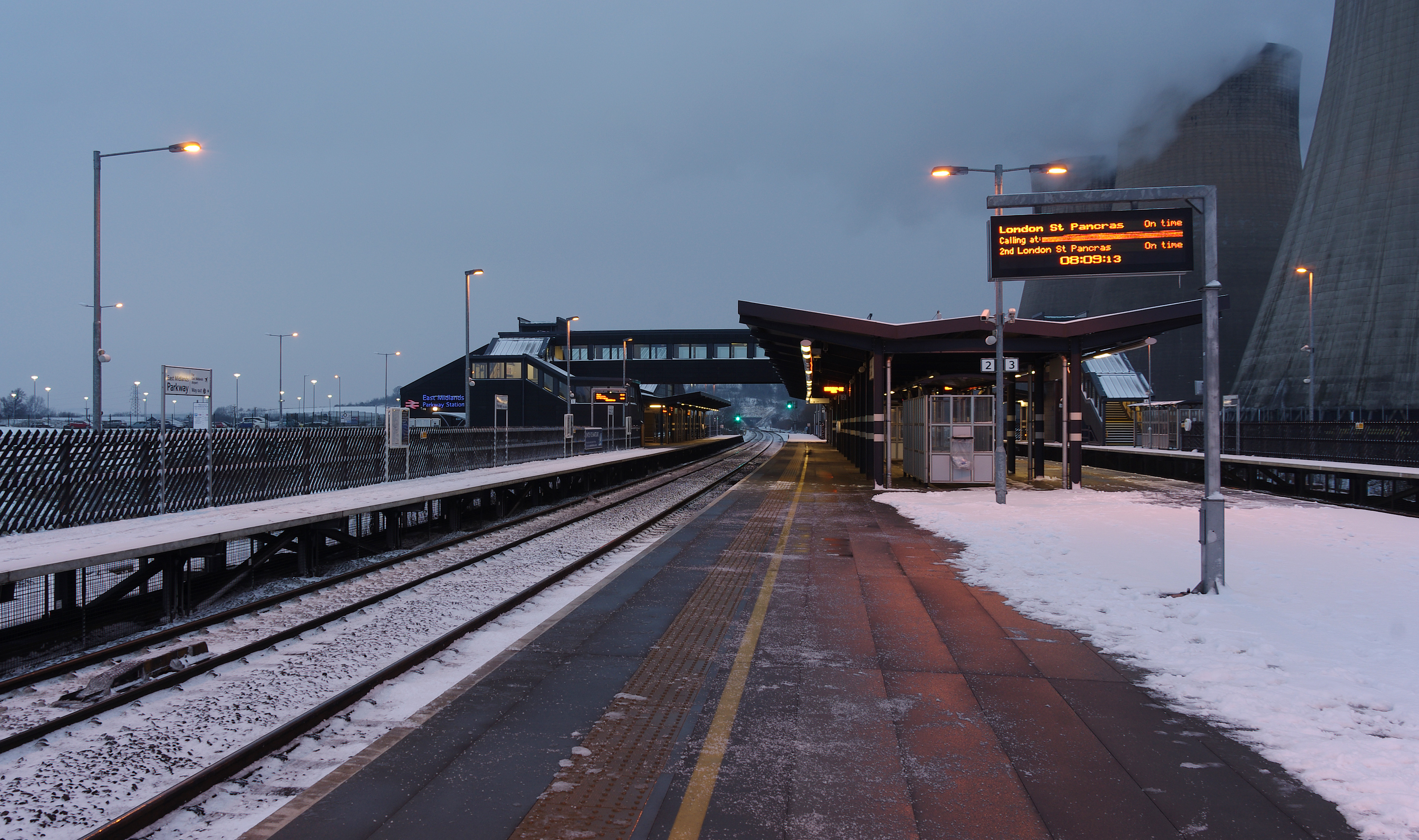

General information
- Location: Ratcliffe-on-Soar, Borough of Rushcliffe, England
- Coordinates: 52.8625°N 1.2632°W
- Grid reference: SK496296
- Managed by: East Midlands Railway
- Platforms: 4

Other information
- Station code: EMD
- Classification: DfT category C1

Key dates
- 26 January 2009: Opened

Passengers
- 2020/21: ▼39,350
- Interchange: ▼3,899
- 2021/22: ▲0.196 million
- Interchange: ▲13,105
- 2022/23: ▲0.310 million
- Interchange: ▼12,120
- 2023/24: ▲0.327 million
- Interchange: ▲13,786
- 2024/25: ▲0.355 million
- Interchange: ▲15,373
Location
Notes
- Passenger statistics from the Office of Rail and Road

East Midlands Parkway railway station is located just north of Ratcliffe-on-Soar, in Nottinghamshire, England; The defunct Ratcliffe-on-Soar Power Station lies next to the railway. It is a stop on the Midland Main Line and it serves East Midlands Airport, some 4 miles (6.4 km) away, Kegworth, Castle Donington, Ratcliffe-on-Soar and other nearby villages. It provides park and ride facilities for passengers on the routes from Leicester to Derby and Nottingham.

== Description ==
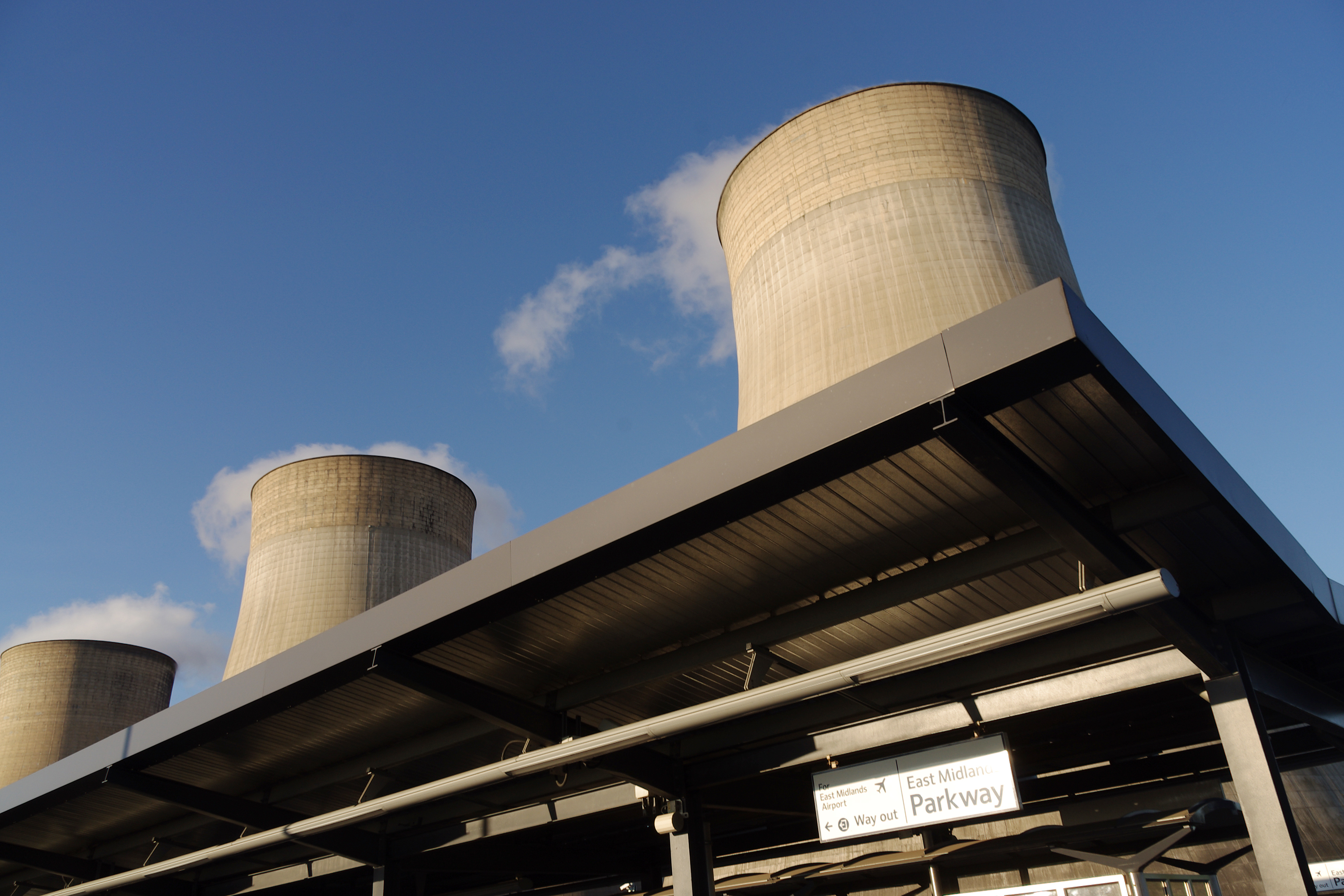
East Midlands Parkway is built next to Ratcliffe-on-Soar Power Station on the eastern side

The station is a stop on the Midland Main Line, which runs from London St Pancras to Nottingham and Sheffield, 118 miles 20 chains (190.30 km) down the line from the London terminus. Just north of the station is Trent Junction, where the lines to Nottingham and Sheffield (via Derby) diverge. There are four platforms: two serving the western fast lines and two serving the eastern slow lines.

The station lies in south-west Nottinghamshire, close to the boundaries with Leicestershire and Derbyshire, between the stations at Loughborough, Long Eaton and Attenborough.

== History ==
Building work commenced on the new £25.5 million station on 19 December 2007. It was due to be completed by 14 December 2008, but did not finally open until 26 January 2009.

The train operating company Midland Mainline was, until October 2006, responsible for the project, which remained in the planning stages for several years for the want of a small piece of land needed for the project. Responsibility was then transferred to Network Rail which anticipated expenditure of £5 million in 2006/07 and £8 million in 2007/08.

In its first year of operation, the station was used by over 250,000 passengers.

=== Controversy ===
People in nearby towns, including Loughborough, voiced their concerns that the opening of the station could lead to the reduction in the number of trains stopping there; this was denied by former operator Midland Mainline. Another concern was the possible withdrawal of the existing bus service from station to East Midlands Airport. A service from Loughborough to the airport (now extended to start from Leicester) is still running; however, since 25 April 2010, it has ceased to serve Loughborough station. As a result, there are no longer any direct late-night or early-morning bus services between the station and the town centre, with only a limited (every 40 minutes) service operating on Sundays.

=== First year ===
To mark the first year of operation of the station, East Midlands Trains offered unlimited travel from the station for the day on Saturday 30 January 2010, under the promotional Red Dot Day banner. The 850 space car park was full for the first time since the station opened and 2,787 passengers travelled. The station saw 182,412 journeys in its first full year of operation.

=== Criticism ===
Fears were raised by various bodies, including East Midlands Airport, about the service pattern proposed for the new station in 2008.

Donington Park motor racing circuit is nearby and its then-owners expressed their desire for spectators to use the station or coach services when travelling to the circuit. The owners were also in support of any future light rail transport to East Midlands Airport itself.

The station has been criticised as being poorly located. In 2011-12, East Midlands Parkway attracted just over one third of the projected annual passengers.

== Facilities ==
East Midlands Parkway is a staffed station with four platforms and a ticket office, which is open from the first to the last train that calls each day. Other facilities include:

- Ticket vending machine
- Cafe
- Lifts to all platforms
- Waiting room
- Pay phone
- Bicycle storage
- Accessible toilets
- Taxi rank
- Business lounge

When it was opened in 2009, East Midlands Parkway was one of the greenest stations in the United Kingdom. The station was built using locally-sourced and recycled materials; it uses a ground-source heating system.

== Services ==
East Midlands Railway operates all services that stop at East Midlands Parkway. The typical off-peak service pattern is as follows:

- Hourly service to Sheffield, via Derby and Chesterfield
- Hourly service to Nottingham, via Beeston.
- Hourly fast service to London St Pancras, via Loughborough and Leicester
- Hourly semi-fast service to London St Pancras, via Loughborough, Leicester, Market Harborough and Kettering.
- Hourly local service to Nottingham
- Hourly local service to Leicester, via Loughborough and Syston.

Preceding station	National Rail	Following station
Leicester	East Midlands Railway Midland Main Line	Long Eaton
Loughborough	East Midlands Railway Midland Main Line	Beeston
Loughborough	East Midlands Railway Ivanhoe line	Beeston
Loughborough	East Midlands Railway Ivanhoe line	Attenborough

== Onward connections ==
When it opened, there was a little-used shuttle bus from the station to the airport, but this ceased not long afterwards. An hourly minibus service was reintroduced in 2015 but later withdrawn. The only public transport to the station now is the Z4 on demand service, operated by Kinchbus on behalf of Nottinghamshire County Council.

Road access is via the A453, which provides a link to the nearby M1 motorway.

== Electrification and future ==
The Midland Main Line is not electrified north of Kettering; therefore, all services are operated by diesel trains. This was set to change by 2019, when a scheme to electrify the remainder of the line had been due to be completed. This, along with increased line speeds, would have meant that the station would have been under 80 minutes from the capital. The electrification scheme was cancelled in 2017.

In November 2021, the Government announced the abandonment of most of the eastern leg High Speed 2 (HS2) and the Northern Powerhouse Rail scheme under the Integrated Rail Plan for the North and Midlands (IRP). As part of this, the earlier proposal for the HS2 East Midlands Hub station on the Toton sidings site further north was shelved and instead the eastern leg of HS2 would connect to the Midland Line at a junction to the south of East Midlands Parkway. This would allow HS2 services to reach Derby and Nottingham directly, the absence of which was a criticism of the previous plan. The IRP also confirmed the rest of the Midland Line would be electrified, reversing a previous decision to cancel electrification.

In October 2023, it was announced that the Eastern Leg of HS2 was cancelled, along with the Birmingham to Manchester line. It will therefore not reach East Midlands Parkway. However the Midlands Rail Hub will go ahead; this will increase the number of trains from the East Midlands to Birmingham by routing more trains to Birmingham Moor Street.
