= High Speed 2 Phase Two =

Cancelled second phase of UK high speed railway

High Speed 2 - Phase Two
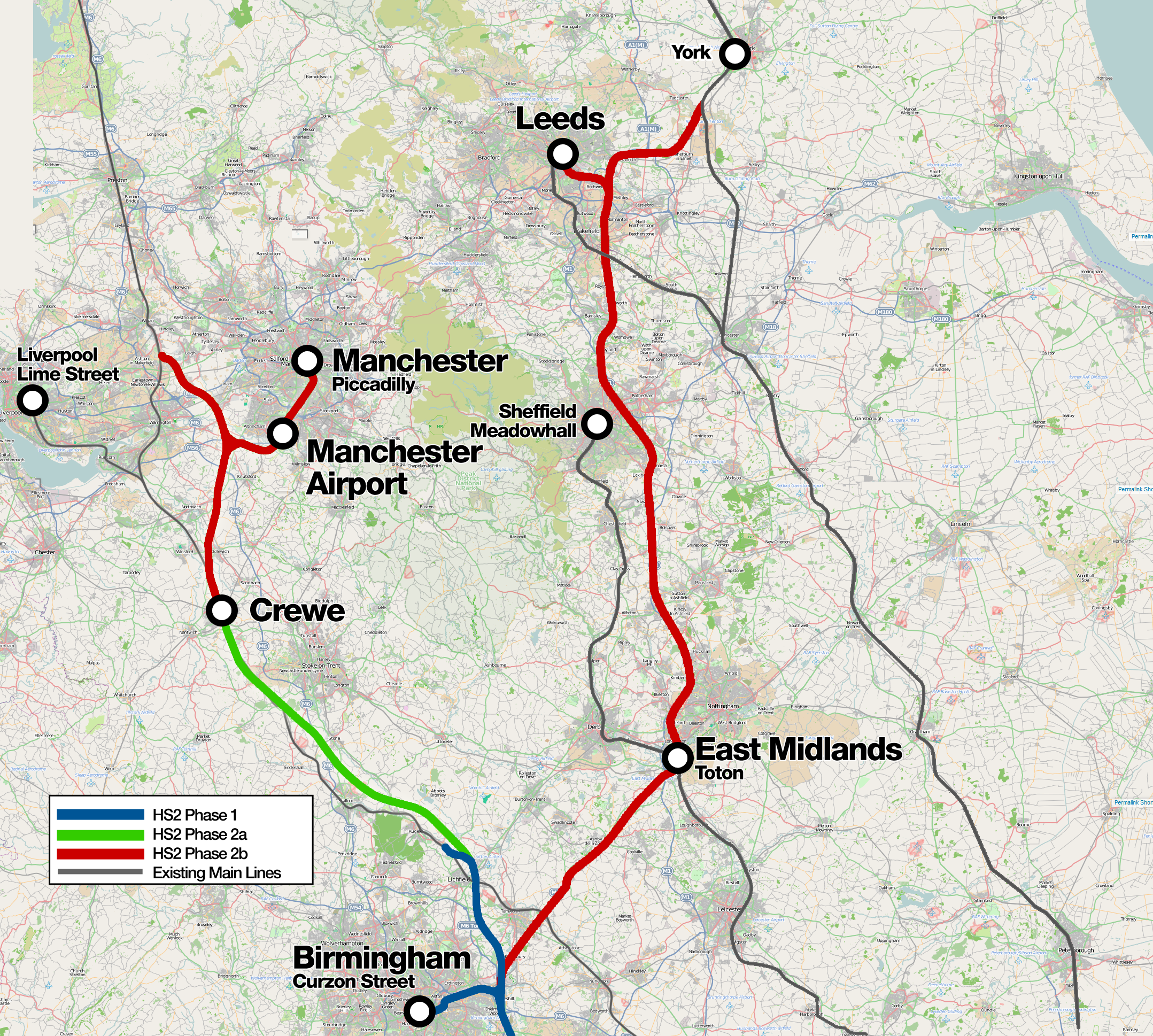
- The Phase Two route, highlighted in red, consists of two lines to Manchester and Leeds

Overview
- Status: Cancelled
- Locale: Midlands, North West, Yorkshire
- Termini: Birmingham Curzon Street; Manchester Piccadilly Leeds New Lane
- Stations: Manchester spur: Crewe; Manchester Airport High Speed; Manchester Piccadilly; Leeds spur: Toton Sidings; Sheffield Meadowhall; Leeds New Lane

Service
- Type: High-speed railway
- System: National Rail
- Depot: Golborne
- Rolling stock: To be decided

History
- Opened: 2032–2033 (planned)

Technical
- Number of tracks: Double track throughout
- Track gauge: 1,435 mm (4 ft 8 1/2 in) standard gauge
- Loading gauge: GC
- Electrification: 25 kV AC overhead
- Operating speed: Up to 250 mph (400 km/h)

High Speed 2 (HS2) is a new high-speed railway line in England. It was originally planned to connect London with the city centres of Birmingham, Manchester and Leeds directly on new high speed track. East Midlands Airport was also to have been served.

Phase 2 was planned for completion in 2032–2033. However, it was finally cancelled on 4 October 2023.

Phase two was split into two sub-phases:

- Phase 2a: the section from Birmingham to Crewe, which was to be built simultaneously with phase 1, effectively merging with phase 1
- Phase 2b: the eastern leg of phase 2 which was scrapped in 2021.

The concept of HS2 was that all major cities covered would have a city centre HS2 station. Liverpool, along with London, Birmingham, Manchester and Leeds, was envisaged to have a city centre HS2 station. The scheme was cut down to only three provincial city centres served directly by HS2, two being on phase 2. The preliminary route for Phase Two was announced on 28 January 2013. It was envisaged construction on Phase Two will start in 2022 with completion by 2032.

== Birmingham to Manchester (phases 2a & 2b) ==
=== Birmingham to Crewe (phase 2a) ===
Birmingham to Crewe was phase 2a, which was proposed to be built before phase 2b, simultaneously with phase 1. HS2 was to pass through Staffordshire and Cheshire, in a tunnel under Crewe station but not stopping at Crewe railway station. However, the HS2 line was to be linked to the West Coast Main Line via a grade-separated junction just south of Crewe, enabling "classic compatible" trains exiting the high-speed line to call at the existing Crewe station.

==== High-speed Crewe hub (phase 2a) ====
HS2 was planned to pass through Staffordshire and Cheshire. The line would have been tunnelled under the Crewe junction, bypassing the existing Crewe station. The HS2 line would have been linked to the West Coast Main Line via a grade-separated junction just south of Crewe, enabling "conventional compatible" trains exiting the high-speed line to call at Crewe station. In 2014, the chairman of HS2 advocated a dedicated hub station in Crewe. In November 2015, it was announced that the Crewe hub completion would be brought forward to 2027. In November 2017, the government and Network Rail supported a proposal to build the hub station on the existing station site, with a junction onto the West Coast Main Line north of the station. This would have enabled through-trains to bypass the station via a tunnel under the station, progressing directly onto the West Coast Main Line.

In 2014 David Higgins, who was then chairman of High Speed Two (HS2) Limited, proposed an addition to phase two: a high-speed hub at Crewe to take advantage of, and have access to, the six classic lines radiating from the existing Crewe junction. Many more regions and cities would have overall superior journey times being accessed with a combination of HS2 and classic lines. The hub was a part of phase two, but Higgins proposed the hub and line from Birmingham to Crewe (phase 2a) should be constructed simultaneously with phase one.

Crewe is a major rail junction with six radiating classic lines from the junction to Scotland/Liverpool, Birmingham/London, Chester, Shrewsbury, Stoke and Manchester. The high-speed hub was to be sited to the south of the current Crewe station. The intention was for high-speed trains to run off the northbound HS2 line into the high-speed hub and out onto a number of classic lines without passing through the bottleneck of the existing Crewe station, keeping line speeds as fast as possible. A new high-speed rail station was proposed as a part of the hub.

On 17 July 2017, this was approved by the government.

=== Manchester Airport (phase 2b) ===
A station is planned to serve Manchester Airport on the southern boundary of Manchester. It will be located next to Junction 5 of the M56 motorway on the northern side of the airport and approximately 1.5 miles (2.4 km) north-west of Manchester Airport railway station. The two stations are not connected. An airport station was recommended by local authorities during the consultation stage. The government agreed in January 2013 for an airport station but agreed only on the basis that private investment was involved, such as funding from the Manchester Airports Group to build the station. The average journey from London Euston to Manchester Airport would be 59 minutes.

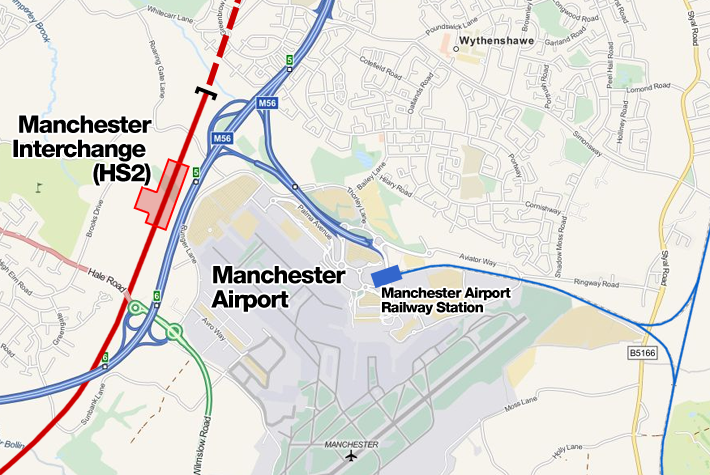
The proposed Manchester Airport High Speed station

Manchester Airport High Speed station was a planned HS2 through-station serving Manchester Airport. It was recommended in 2013 by local authorities, during the consultation stage. Construction was dependent on part-funding by investment from the majority publicly owned Manchester Airports Group.

The proposed site was located on the northwestern side of the airport, to the west of the M56 motorway, at junction 5, and approximately 1.5 mi (2.4 km) northwest of the existing Manchester Airport railway station. A sub-surface station was planned, approximately 8.5 metres (27 ft 11 in) below ground level, consisting of two central 415-metre (1,362 ft) platforms, a pair of through-tracks for trains to pass through the station without stopping, a street-level passenger concourse, and a main entrance on the eastern side, facing the airport.

Proposals did not detail passenger interchange methods; various options were being considered to integrate the new station with existing transport networks, including extending the Manchester Metrolink airport tram line to connect the HS2 station with the existing airport railway station.

If the station had been built, it is estimated that the average journey time from London Euston to Manchester Airport would have been 59 minutes.

=== Manchester city centre (phase 2b) ===
A new Manchester Piccadilly High Speed station was planned to be built on a viaduct parallel to the north side of the existing station. The station was to have six platforms on three islands for both terminating High Speed 2 trains from London and Birmingham as well as Northern Powerhouse Rail trains to Liverpool, Warrington, Huddersfield, Leeds, and beyond. It was proposed to relocate the present Piccadilly Metrolink stop from ground-level, below the existing station platforms, to a new larger four-platform stop located underground below the high-speed station. Provision for a second ground-level Metrolink stop at the eastern end of the high-speed station—to service future Metrolink extensions—to be called Piccadilly Central, also formed part of the plans.

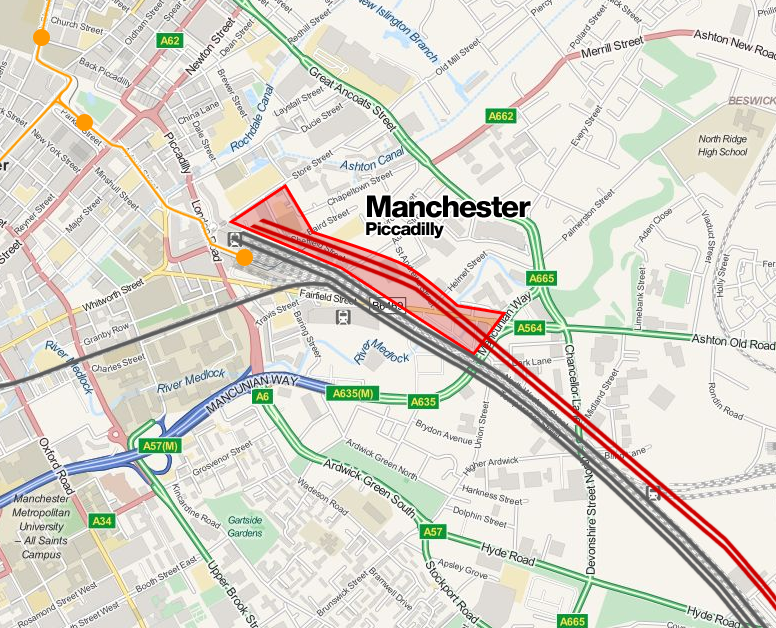
Map of the proposed extension of Manchester Piccadilly station

The route was to continue from the airport into Manchester city centre via a 7.5-mile (12.1 km) bored tunnel under the dense urban districts of south Manchester before surfacing at Ardwick. The tunnel was to be the longest rail tunnel to be built in the United Kingdom, surpassing the 6.2-mile (10.0 km) High Speed 1 tunnel completed in 2004. It was anticipated that the stretch from Rostherne in Cheshire to Ardwick would take up to 7 years to construct.

The 7.6 mile twin-bore tunnel would have been at an average depth of 33 metres and trains will travel at 142 miles per hour (229 km/h) through the tunnel. The diameter size of the tunnel is dependent on the train speed and length of the tunnel. It was envisaged both tunnels would be, as an 'absolute minimum', at least 7.25 metres in diameter to accommodate the high speed trains.

Up to fifteen sites were put forward including Sportcity, Pomona Island, expanding Deansgate railway station and re-configuring the disused grade-II listed Manchester Central terminal station building back into a station. Three final sites made the long list: Manchester Piccadilly station, Salford Central station and a newly built station at Salford Middlewood Locks. Three approaches were considered, one via the M62, one via the River Mersey and the other through south Manchester. Both Manchester and Salford City Council recommended routing High Speed 2 to Manchester Piccadilly to maximise economic potential and connectivity rather than building a new station at a greater cost and which could be isolated from existing transport links.

HS2 trains would have terminated at an upgraded Manchester Piccadilly station. At least four new 400-metre-long (1,300 ft) platforms would have been built to accommodate the new high-speed trains in addition to the two platforms which were planned as part of the Northern Hub proposal. It was envisaged Platform 1 under the existing listed train shed would have also been converted to a fifth HS2 platform to reduce cost. However at 242 metres long, it is the shortest platform at the station and fell short of the 400 metre platform required to accommodate High Speed trains. The HS2 concourse would have been connected to the existing concourse at Piccadilly. HS2 would have reduced the average journey time from central Manchester to central London from 2 hours 8 minutes to 1 hour 8 minutes.

=== Network North ===
On 4 October 2023, all of HS2 Phase 2 was axed by Prime Minister Rishi Sunak. He said that the £36 billion saved by not building the northern leg of HS2 would instead be spent on roads, buses and railways in every region of the country, under the title "Network North." The locations of these projects would range from southern Scotland to Plymouth. Money would be distributed in the North, Midlands and South of England according to where the reduction of costs (not benefits) would lie. After it was found that the list of projects included some errors and some schemes that had already been built, they were swiftly deleted. Sunak said that the list was intended to provide only illustrative examples.

== Birmingham to Leeds (phase 2b) ==
A new station in the East Midlands was proposed, which may have been a parkway station, (Note: In British usage, a parkway station is one with car parking, remote from the location it is intended to serve) to serve Nottingham, Derby and Leicester. The Derbyshire and Nottingham chamber of the British Chambers of Commerce supported high-speed rail going to the East Midlands but was concerned that a parkway station instead of centrally located city stations would result in no overall net benefit in journey times to existing services. East Midlands Parkway railway station was recently constructed on the Midland Main Line south of Derby and Nottingham. HS2 would have continued north to a station at Sheffield railway station in South Yorkshire (serving Sheffield and surrounding large towns), terminating in West Yorkshire at Leeds railway station.

=== Leeds (phase 2b) ===
HS2 would have reduced the average journey time from central Leeds to London from 2 hours 20 minutes to 1 hour 28 minutes.

== Service pattern and journey times ==
Since the cancellation of phase 2 of HS2, services and journey times will differ from the original plans as outlined in the tables below.

Proposed Phase 2 service frequencies from London to the North West and Scotland
Route	tph	Calling at	Train length
London Euston – Manchester Piccadilly	3	Old Oak Common, Wilmslow (1tph), Stockport	200 m
London Euston – Macclesfield	1	Old Oak Common, Stafford, Stoke-on-Trent; Would only operate if phase 2a was open.	200 m
London Euston – Liverpool Lime Street	1	Old Oak Common, Stafford, Runcorn; Would call at Crewe in lieu of Stafford if phase 2a was open.	200 m
London Euston – Liverpool Lime Street	1	Old Oak Common, Crewe, Runcorn; Would operate combined with the Lancaster train (see below) between London and Crewe if phase 2a was open.	200 m
London Euston – Lancaster	1	Old Oak Common, Crewe, Warrington Bank Quay, Wigan North Western, Preston; Would operate combined with the Liverpool train (see above) between London and Crewe if phase 2a was open.	200 m
London Euston – Glasgow Central	1	Old Oak Common, Preston, Carlisle	200 m

Proposed Phase 2 journey times
London to/from	Fastest journey time before HS2 (hrs:min)	Estimated time with full HS2 including Phase 2 (hrs:min)	Estimated time reduction with Phase 2 active (min.)
Birmingham	1:21	0:52	0:29
Liverpool	2:03	1:50	0:13
Manchester	2:08	1:40	0:28
Glasgow	4:30	4:00	0:30
