= North West England electrification schemes =

Railway electrification programmes in North West England

North West England electrification schemes are a series of individual railway lines in North West England that have been, and continue to be, electrified and upgraded. It is planned that these schemes will result in a modernised, cleaner, lower carbon and faster railway with improved capacity.

== Previous schemes in the 20th century ==
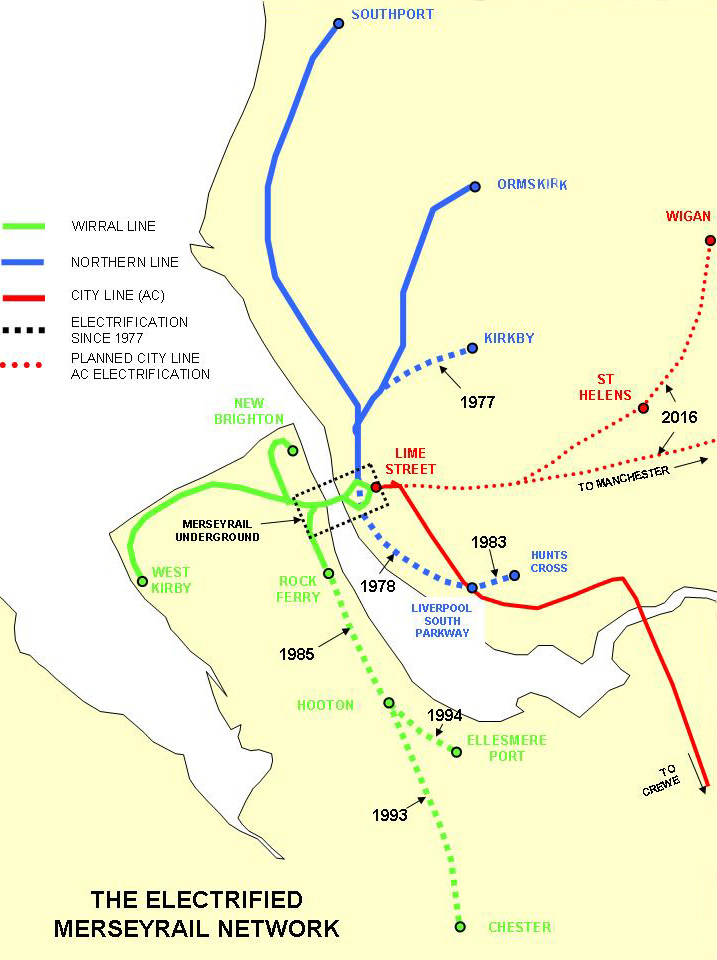

British Railways' 1955 Modernisation Plan called for the phasing out of steam traction. Under this plan, parts of the railways in North West England were to be electrified. Crewe to Manchester Piccadilly and the Styal Line were completed very early on in this plan. It also included the line from Crewe to Liverpool Lime Street, with Warrington Bank Quay, Wigan North Western and Preston following in the early 1970s.

There was a pause in electrification projects in the late 1960s when funding ran out, but then the West Coast Main Line (WCML) north of Weaver Junction, through North West England, to just south of Glasgow Central, was electrified progressively between 1970 and 1974. The line from Preston to Blackpool North was also proposed as a logical extension for electrification, in conjunction with the Weaver Junction to Glasgow scheme in a document published by the British Railways Board in April 1968.

No further 25 kV AC activity occurred in the North West until after 2009, although there were some third rail infill schemes. In 1956, British Railways adopted 25 kV AC Overhead Line Electrification (OHLE) as standard for most electrification projects. Some exceptions for third rail extensions were allowed and confirmed by the Office of Rail and Road decades later. Parts of the North West had already been electrified with the third rail system, including the Merseyrail network.

In 2007, Gordon Brown became prime minister and selected Andrew Adonis as Secretary of State for Transport. In a 2009 government paper, Adonis put electrification back on the agenda and proposed infill electrification schemes North West England, as well as other railway electrification projects elsewhere. However, as of December 2025, there is little new electrification taking place.

== Developments in the 21st century ==
Department for Transport plans from 2012 for UK railway electrification by 2019, including the Northern Hub (red in the north)

The 2009 Adonis/DfT paper specifically stated that the work would commence immediately on the line between Liverpool and Manchester and a four-year time frame was given. The first phase of the North West project was to be between Manchester and Newton-le-Willows. This would allow diesel trains running between Glasgow Central / Edinburgh Waverley and Manchester Airport to be replaced by electric trains throughout, via the West Coast Main Line. Also reported in the paper was that the lines between Manchester and Preston, and Liverpool and Preston, were to be electrified. Work was announced as having started in the Manchester area in March 2011.

In July 2012, the coalition government announced new electrification schemes, all at 25 kV AC and reconfirmed schemes previously announced by Adonis. These were:

- Electrification of the North West Triangle: Manchester–Liverpool, via the Chat Moss line; Huyton-Wigan; Manchester-Euxton Junction-Blackpool North–Preston
- Part of the Northern Hub: the new Ordsall Chord.

The North West Triangle called for a major civil engineering project to rebore the Farnworth tunnel, on the Manchester–Preston line, in advance of its electrification.

In August 2013, the Department for Transport announced that the Windermere branch line, between Oxenholme and Windermere, was to be electrified by 2016. However, the Hendy review moved the completion of GRIP 3 to March 2017, with no date for completion.

In December 2013, it was announced that the line from Bolton to Wigan North Western would also be electrified by 2017. However, the enhancements delivery plan update of September 2016 moved the completion date with only GRIP Stage 3 (Option selection) being completed by then. On 1 September 2021, the Department for Transport formally announced this would now go ahead.

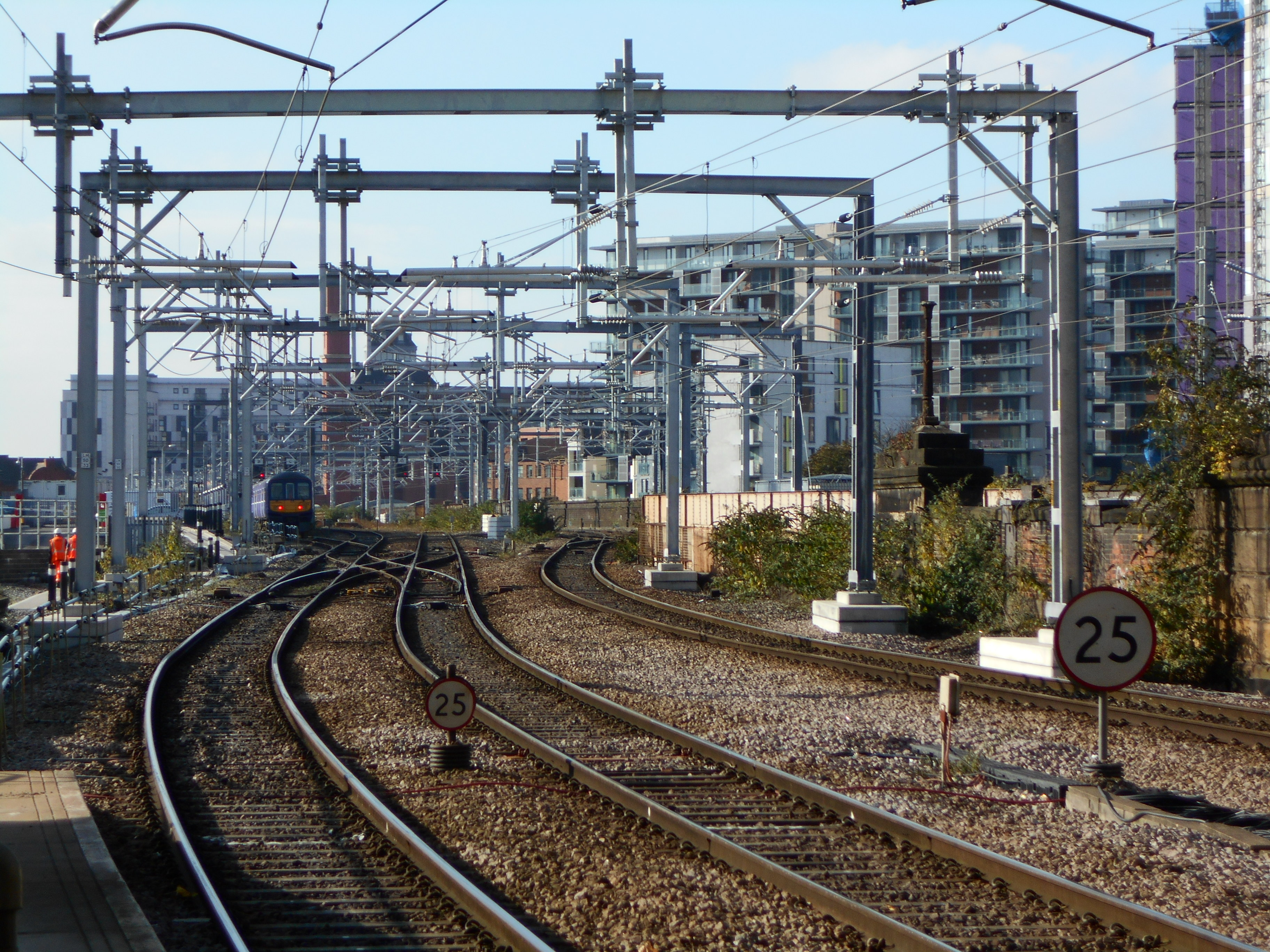
Newly-installed overhead electrification at Manchester Victoria, 2015

In July 2017, the Secretary of State for Transport, Chris Grayling, announced a number of electrification schemes were to be cancelled, including the Windermere branch line.

In February 2019, the final electric test train ran on the Preston to Manchester line, in readiness for commencing electric services.

In March 2019, the Railway Industry Association published a paper on the electrification cost challenge, suggesting ways forward and a rolling programme of electrification. In April, the power was switched on from Manchester Victoria to Miles Platting. This section of line is now part of the TransPennine Route Upgrade. Most of the schemes first planned in the 2010 timeframe have now been completed.

From December 2021 onwards, the Wigan to Bolton electrification and associated works was progressed. This electrification scheme is claimed to also improve logistics and not have diesel trains running under the wires. The National Electrification Efficiency Panel (NEEP) was involved in this scheme. This panel was commissioned by the Department for Transport at the end of 2021. and chaired by Professor Andrew McNaughton; it was claimed the civil engineering costs had already been halved. As part of this scheme, several bridges required demolishing and rebuilding. In August 2023, the principal contractor started liquidation proceedings and work on the scheme was halted. The scheme was due for completion in 2025. The line was energised on 1 January 2025.

== Future proposals ==
In September 2020, the TDNS Traction Decarbonisation Network Strategy interim business case was published. The principal recommendation was further electrification of 8,078 miles (13,000 km) of railways. This document proposed a number of lines in the North West for further electrification. It included a list of suggestions (Note: On page 213.) including Liverpool to Manchester, via Warrington and Chester, the former Cheshire Lines Committee (CLC) route, but no attempt was made to prioritise the schemes in this publication. The Railway Engineering Institution (Note: Formerly the Permanent Way Institution.) gave a fuller presentation up to strategic outline business case for the CLC in November 2025.

As part of the Transport for Greater Manchester's Delivery Plan, proposals have been put forward to electrify the line between Manchester Victoria and Rochdale, via Mills Hill. This is part of their 2040 strategy and they aimed to complete business cases for the early delivery of it, subject to funding.

== Integration with other schemes ==
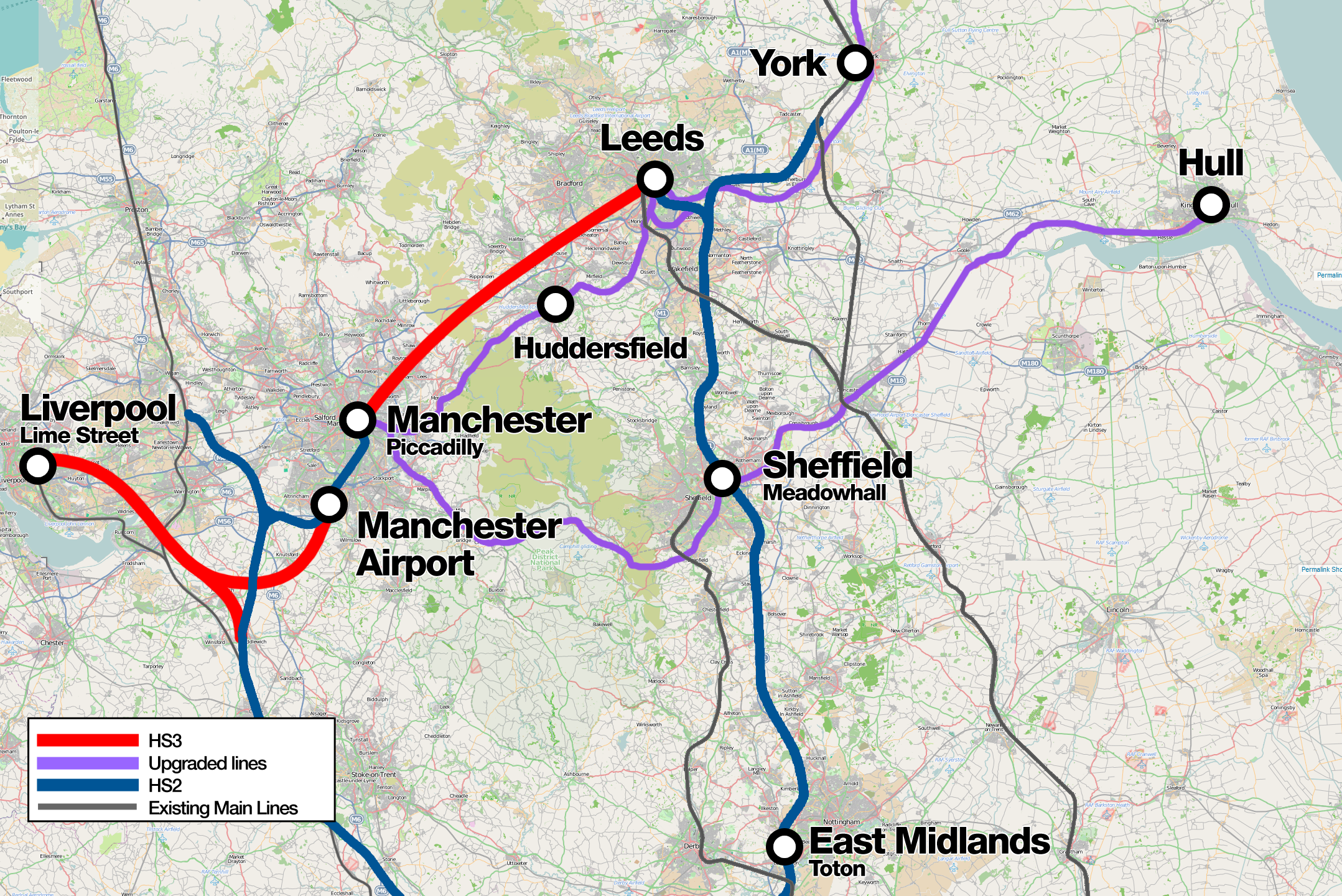
A Northern Powerhouse Rail map from 2017

The Northern Hub and the Great North Rail Project are railway schemes across Northern England that include electrifying lines in the North West. The original aim was to have series of upgrades that would reduce bottlenecks in the Manchester area. The scheme also involved building and electrifying the Ordsall Chord to connect Victoria and Piccadilly stations.

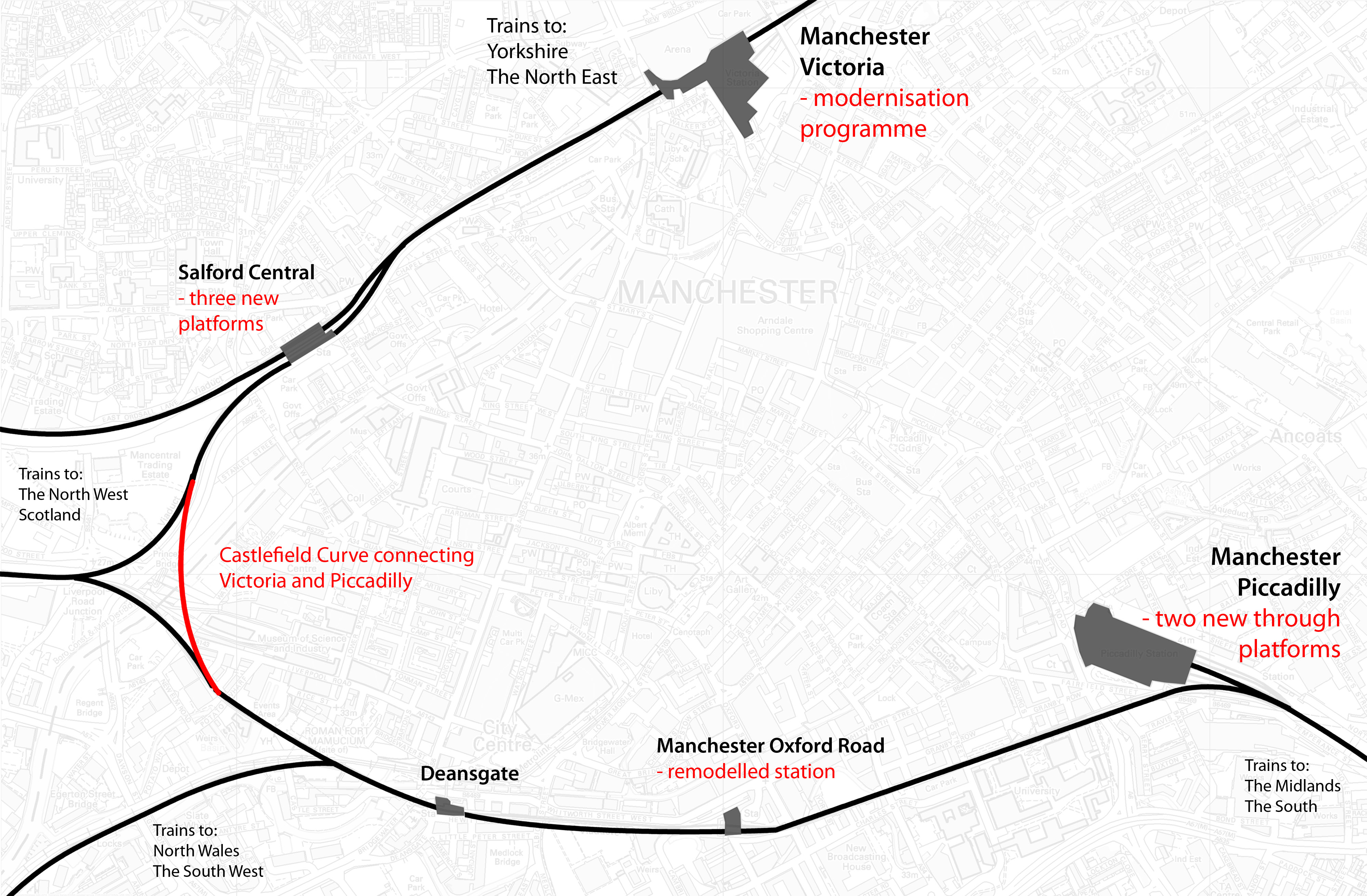
Schematic map showing proposed railway improvements around Manchester city centre for the Northern Hub project

The Manchester to Stalybridge scheme was originally part of North West England Electrification schemes, but became part of Transpennine Route Upgrade.

On 18 November 2021, the Integrated Rail Plan for the North and Midlands (IRP) was published. This document stated HS2 would be built from Crewe to Manchester Piccadilly, reducing it to a high speed link from London to the North West just south of Wigan North Western station, via Birmingham Curzon Street. It wzs planned for Warrington to have a high speed link to a reopened Bank Quay low-level station. The HS2 track from the east would merge onto regular but upgraded track leaving the west side towards Liverpool Lime Street.

Northern Powerhouse Rail is also included in the plan. It involves building less high-speed rail than previously proposed. A link was introduced from HS2 to Liverpool, via a section of new high speed line from reinstated low-level platforms at Warrington Bank Quay, and onwards via upgraded sections to join the existing line to Lime Street station.

== Summary of individual schemes ==
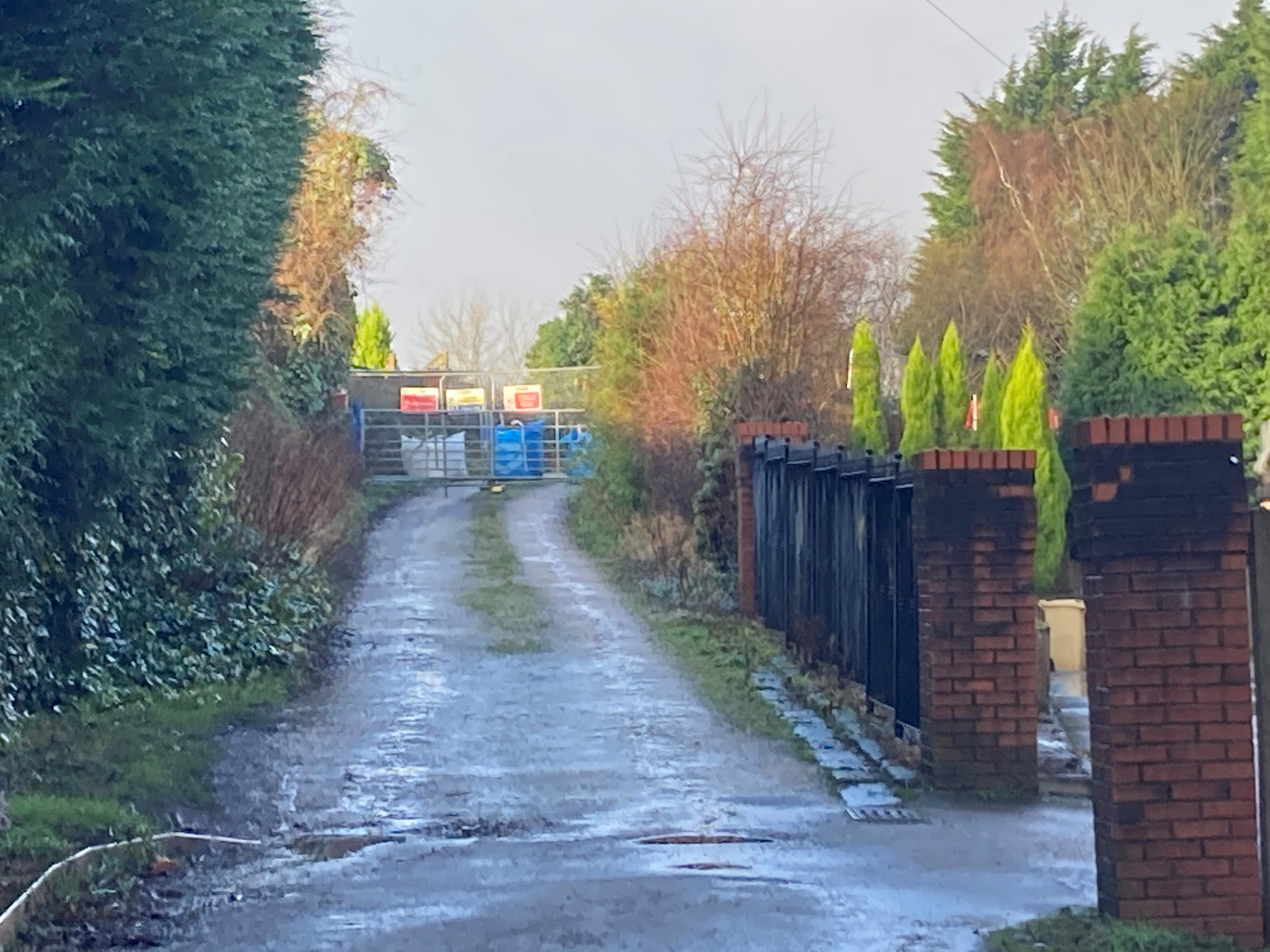
Lostock Junction to Wigan electrification work site mobilisation, 2021

- Manchester to Newton-le-Willows: completed
- Newton-le-Willows to Liverpool: completed
- Liverpool-Wigan line: completed
- Manchester-Preston line: completed
- Preston-Blackpool North: completed
- Salford Crescent to Manchester Victoria: completed
- Oxenholme to Windermere: cancelled
- Lostock Junction (Bolton) to Wigan: completed
- Manchester Victoria to Rochdale: proposed.

== Gallery ==
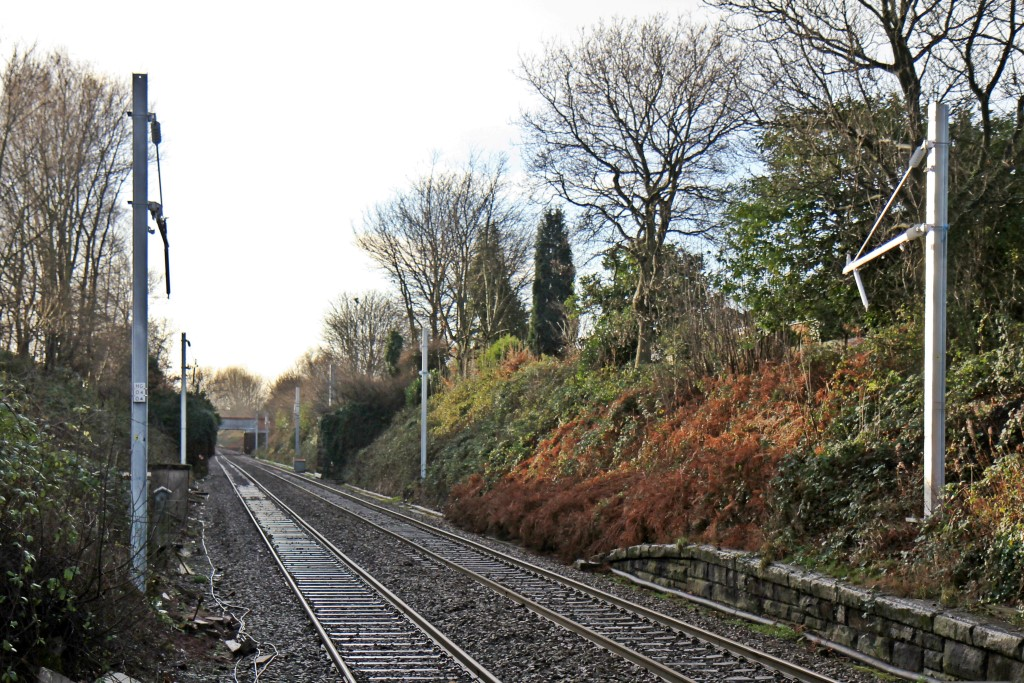
Partially-erected catenary at Eccleston Park, 2013

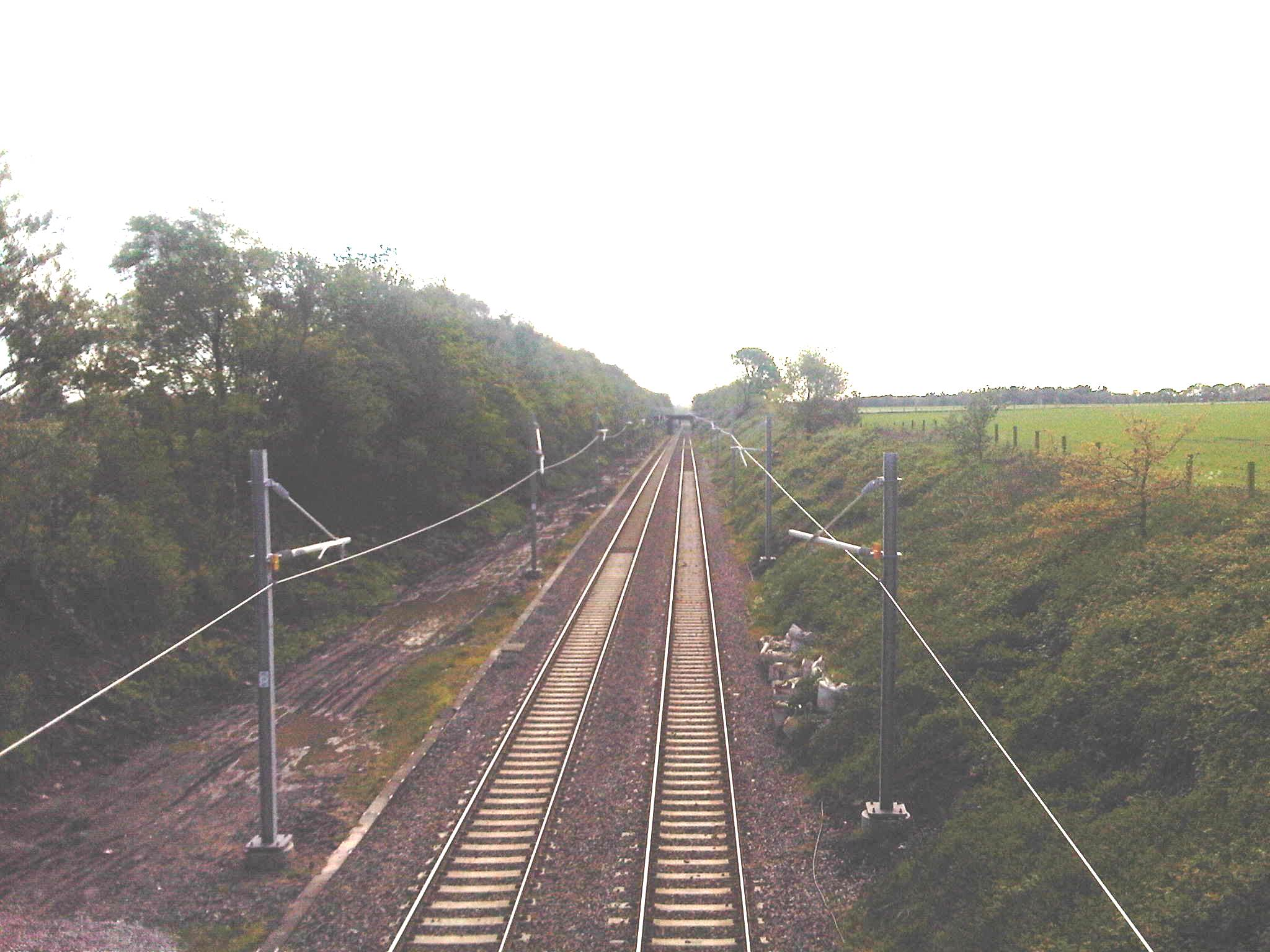
Electrification return wires, west of Garswood, towards St Helens Central, 2014

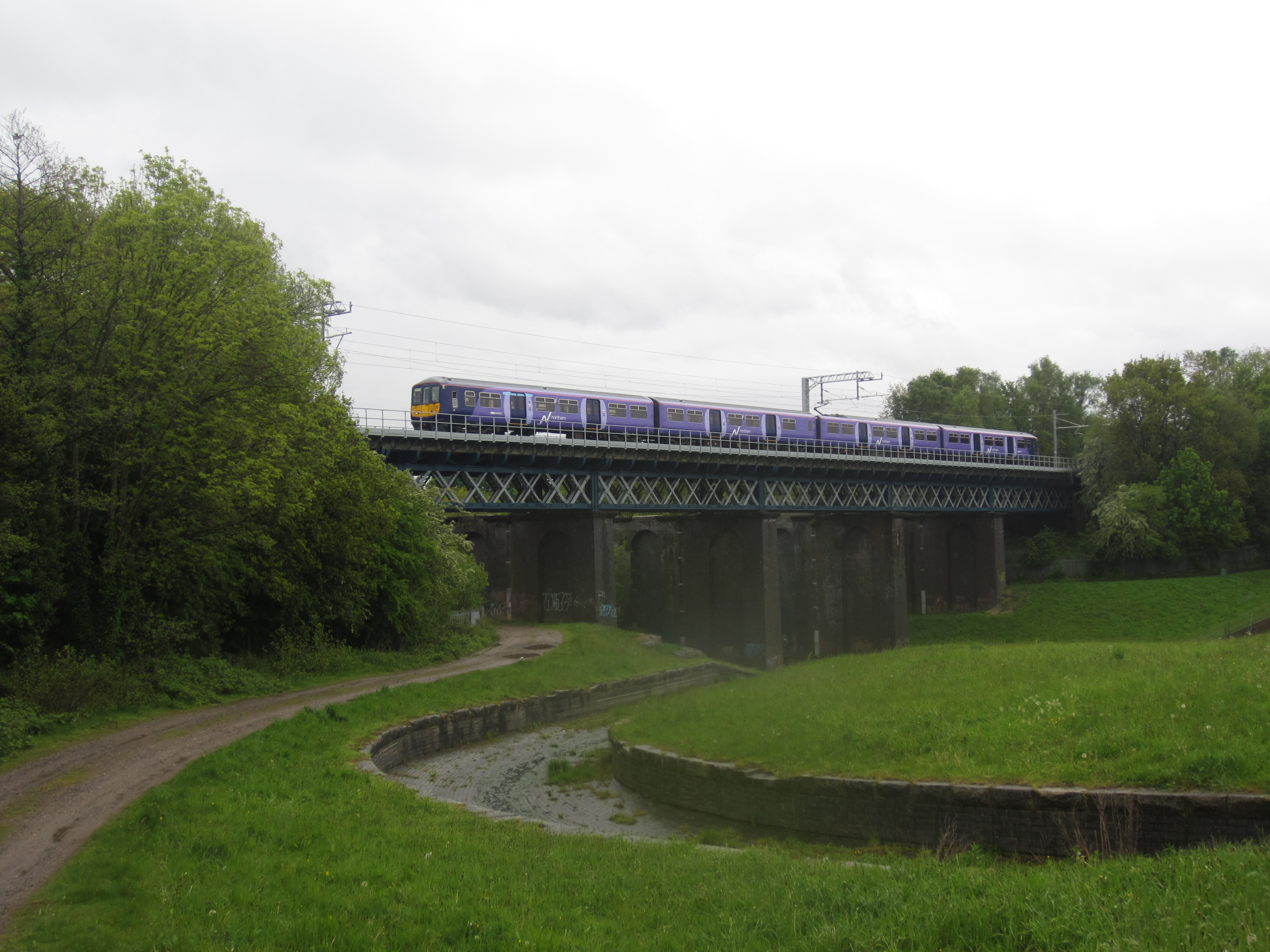
An electric multiple unit crosses Carr Mill Viaduct, St Helens, on the first day of electric services on the Liverpool to Wigan route, 2015

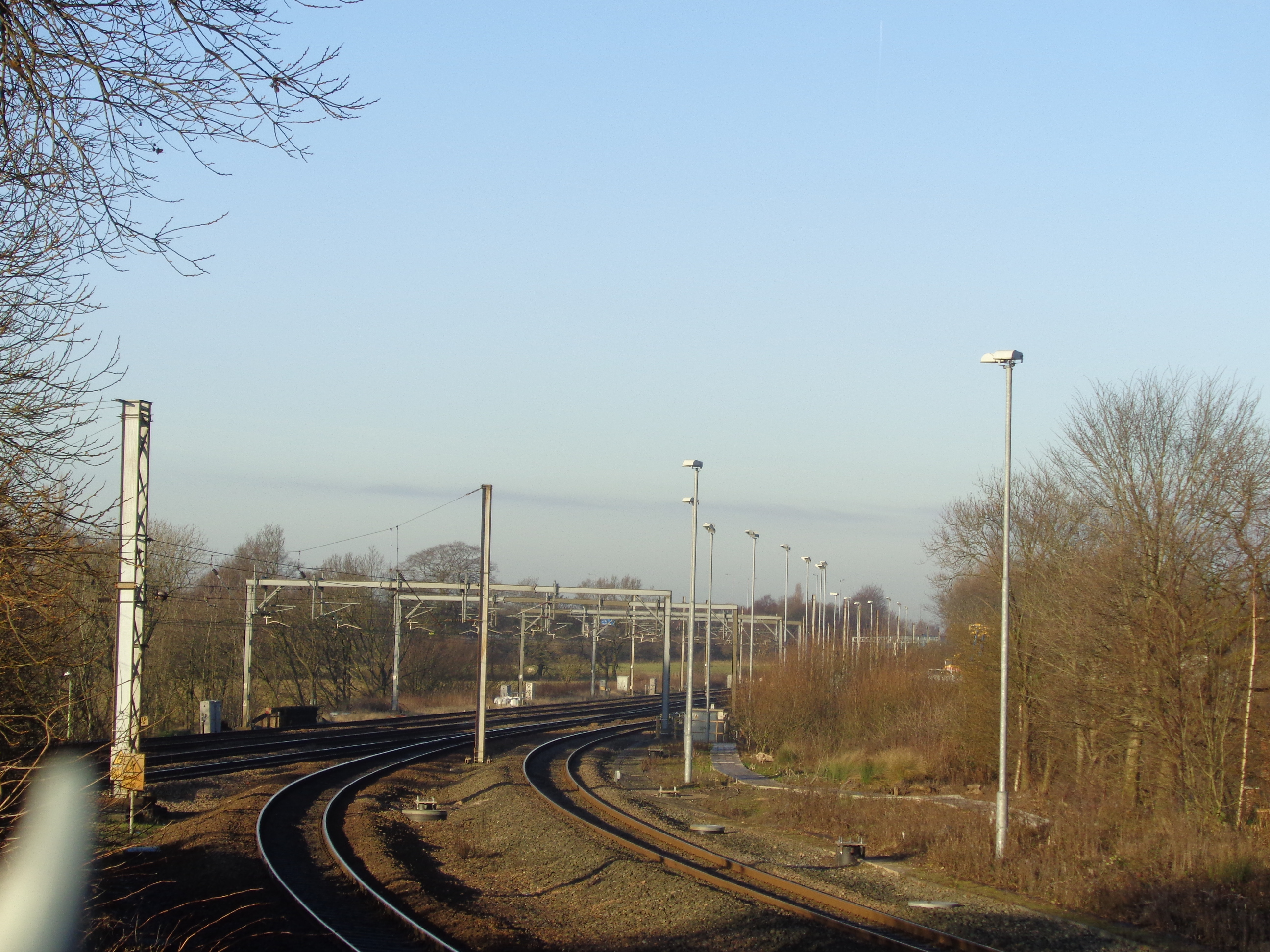
Electrification work at Euxton Junction, 2016

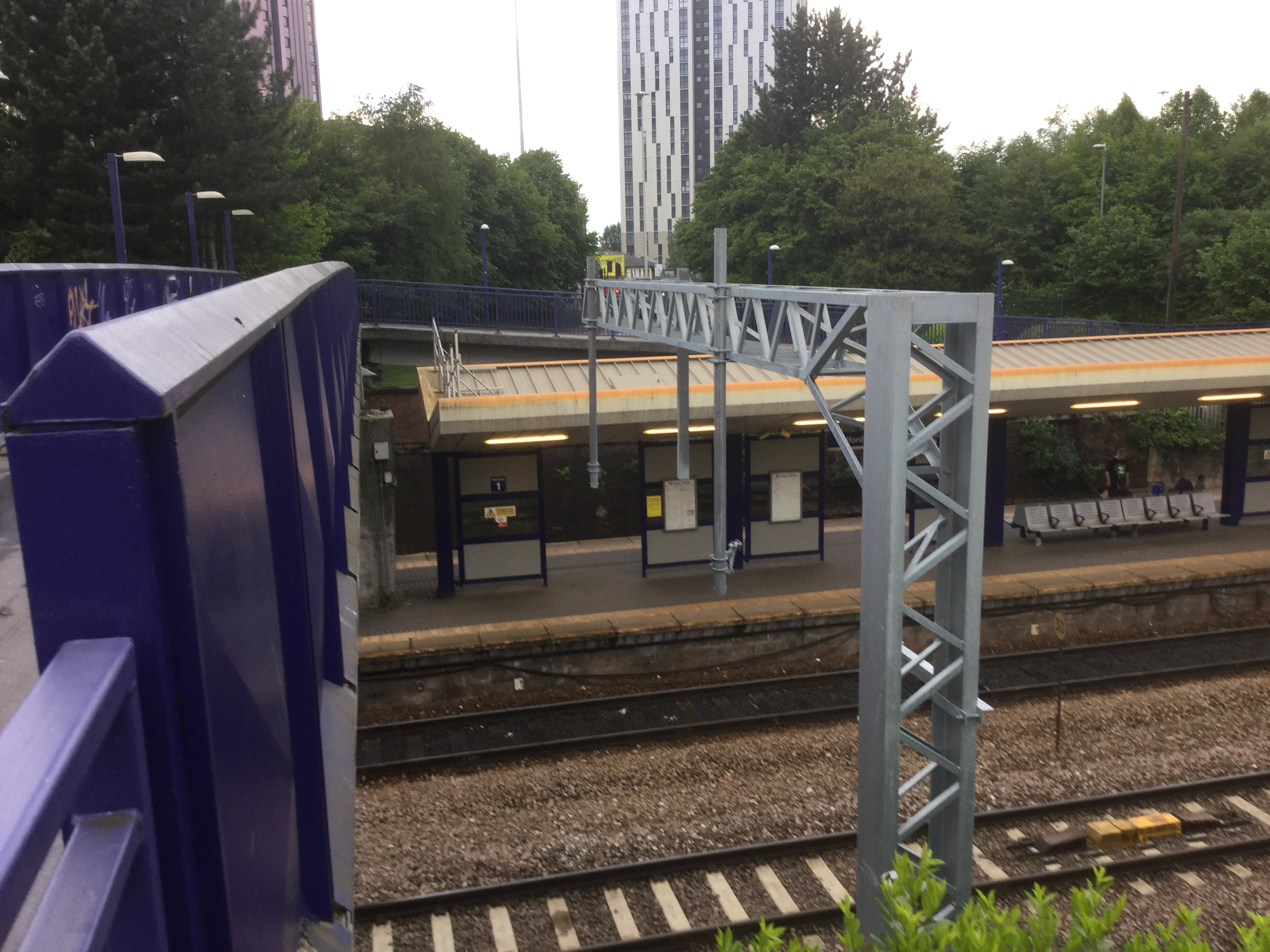
Salford Crescent electrification progress (1/5)

Salford Crescent electrification progress (2/5)

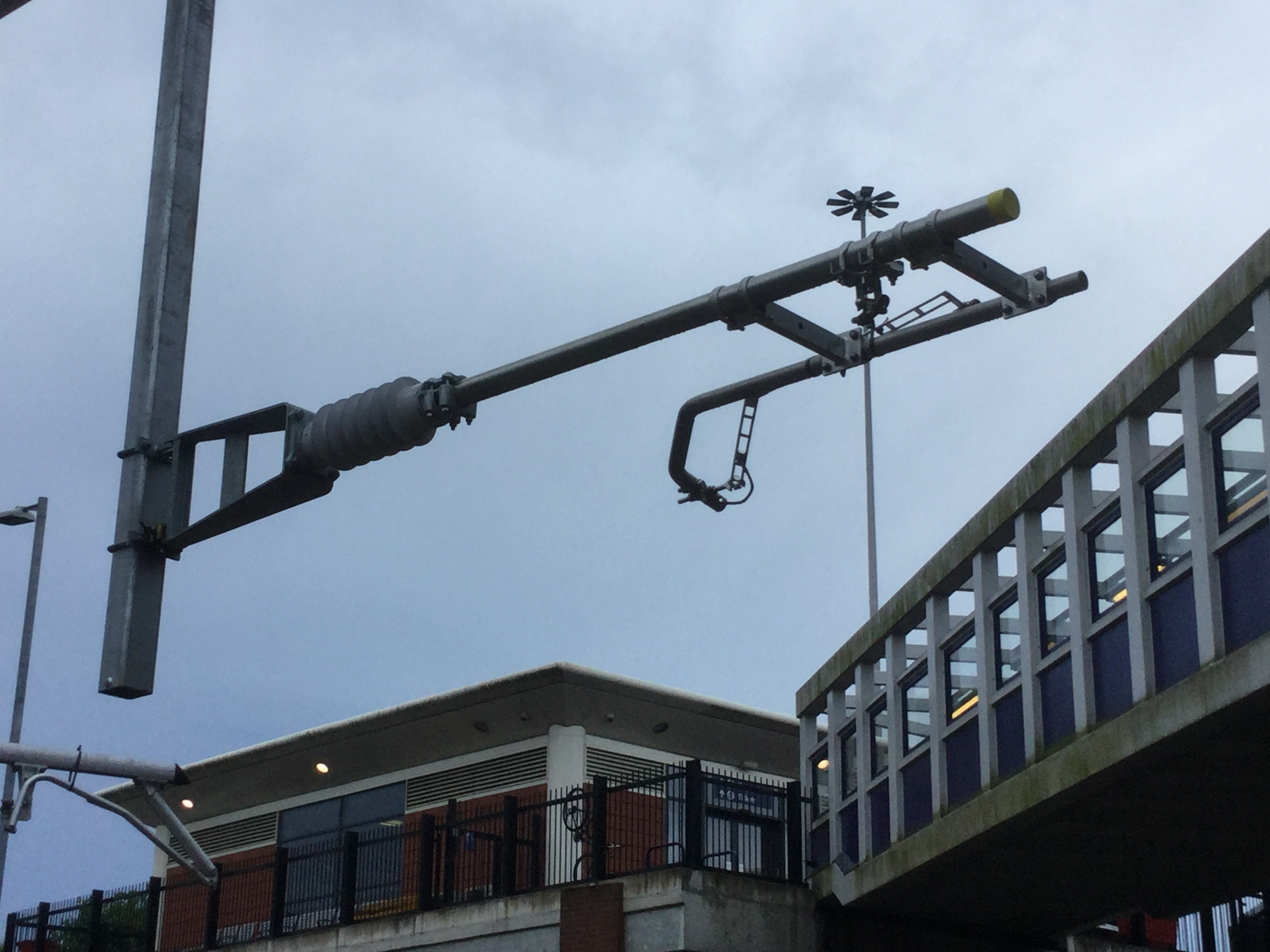
Salford Crescent electrification progress (3/5)

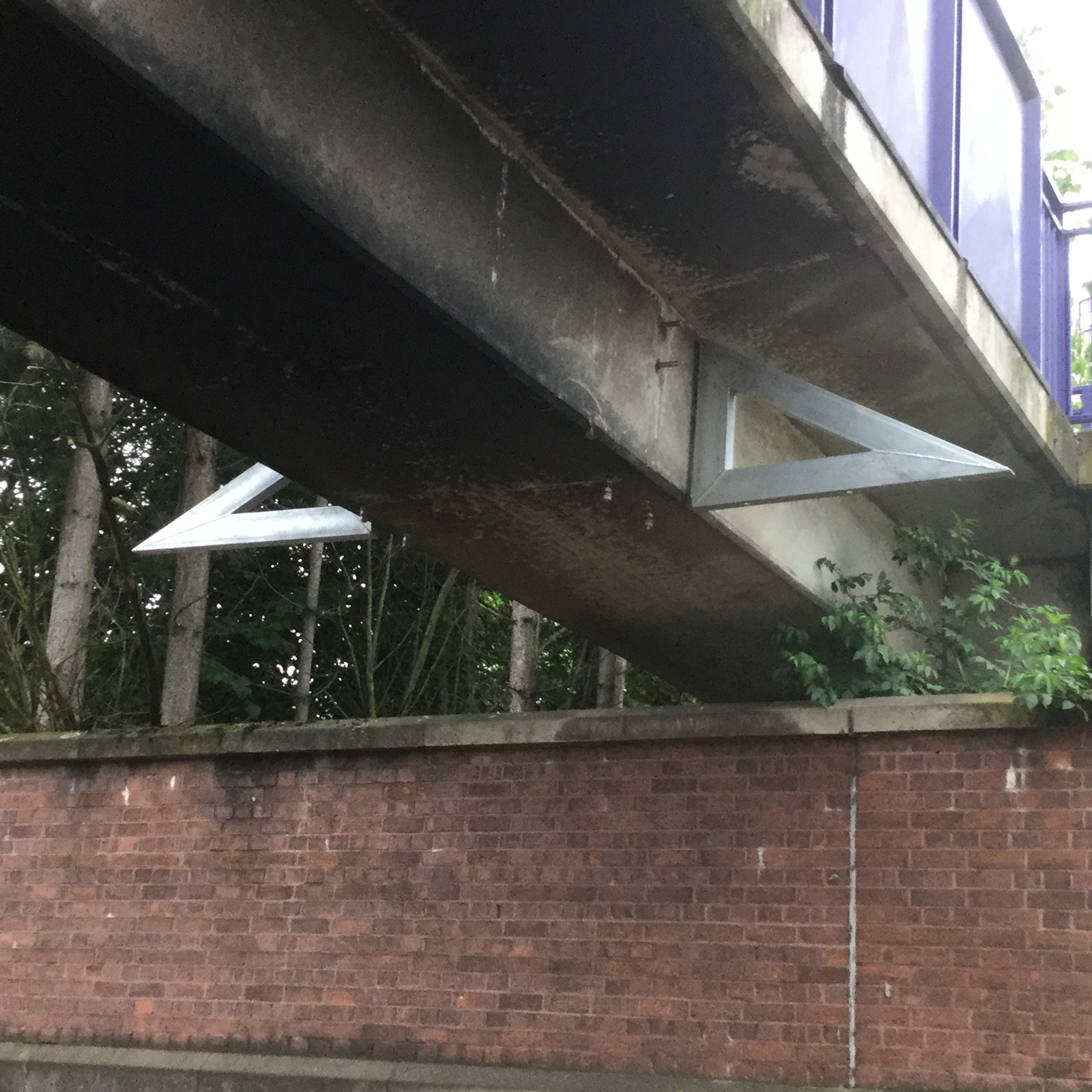
Salford Crescent electrification progress (4/5)

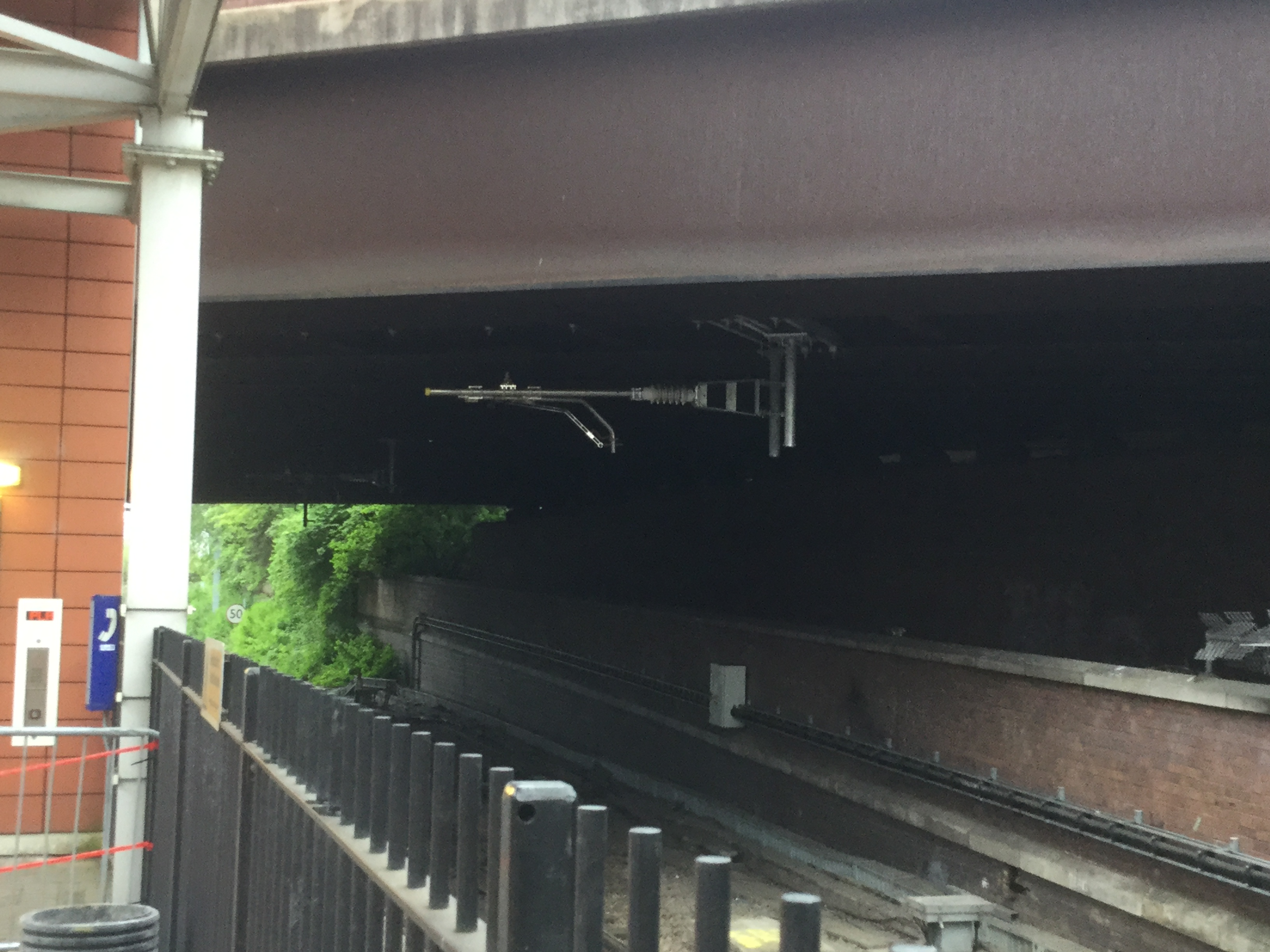
Salford Crescent electrification progress (5/5)

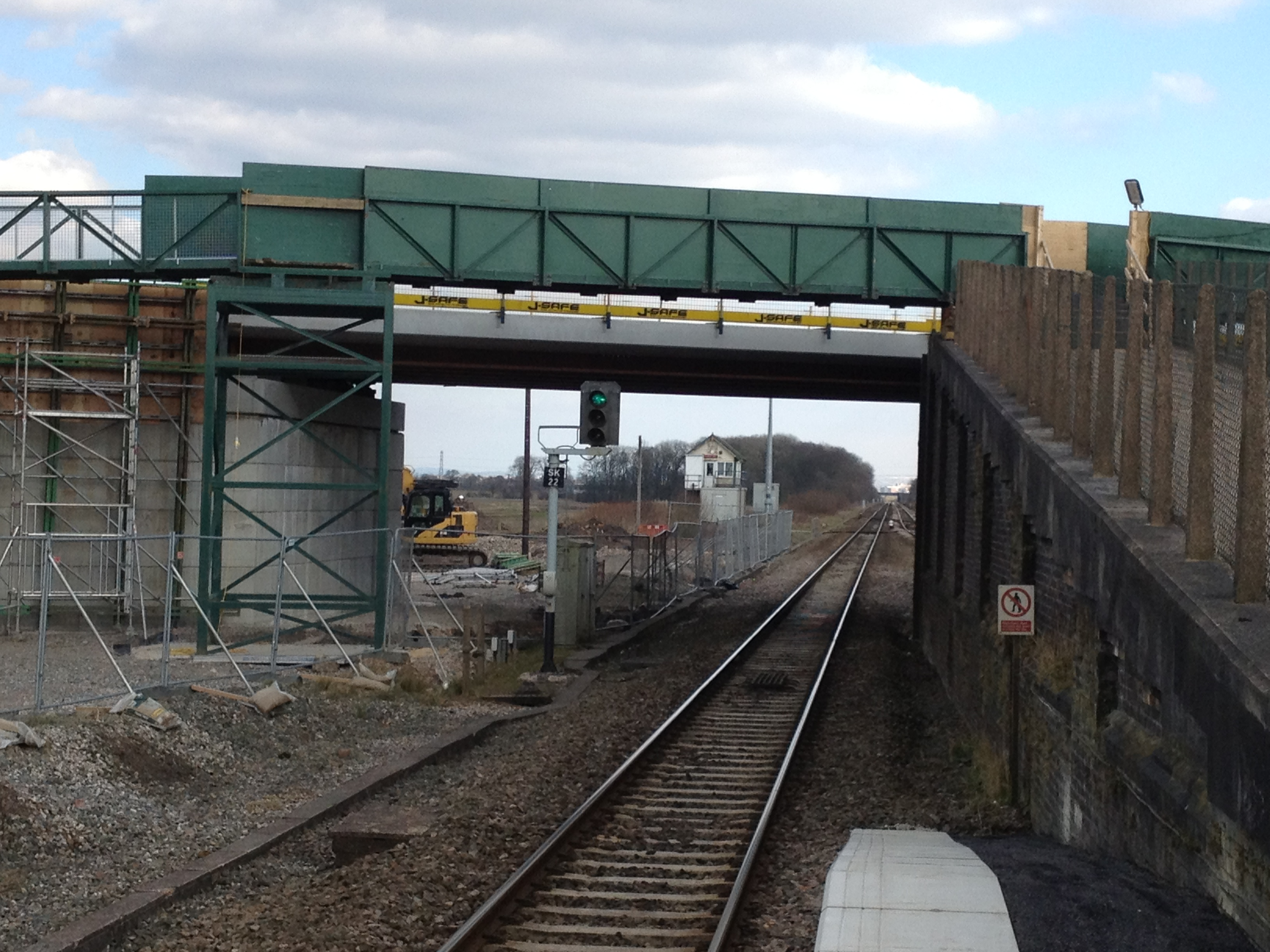
The Salwick rebuild for electrification (1/2)

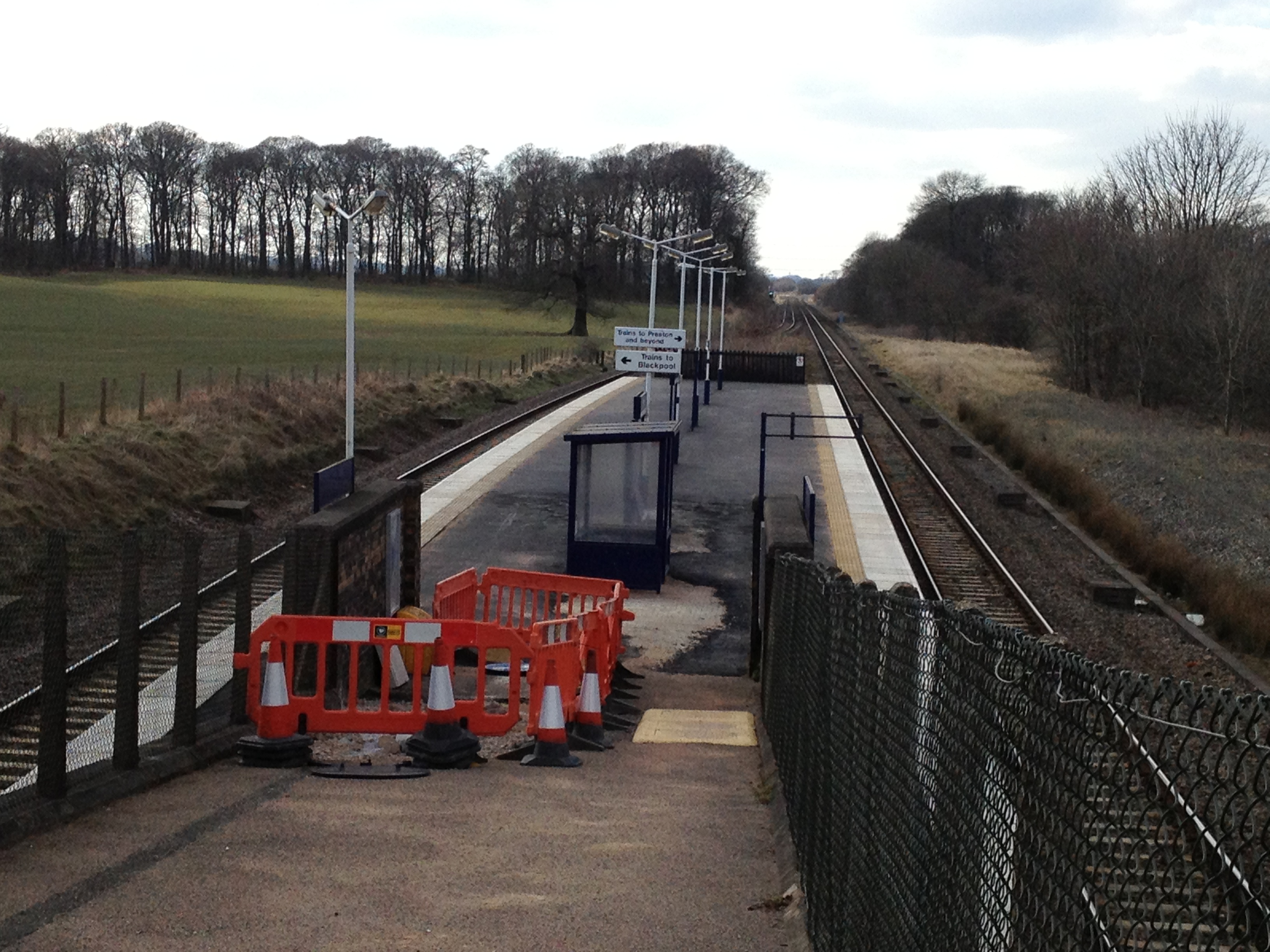
The Salwick rebuild for electrification (2/2)

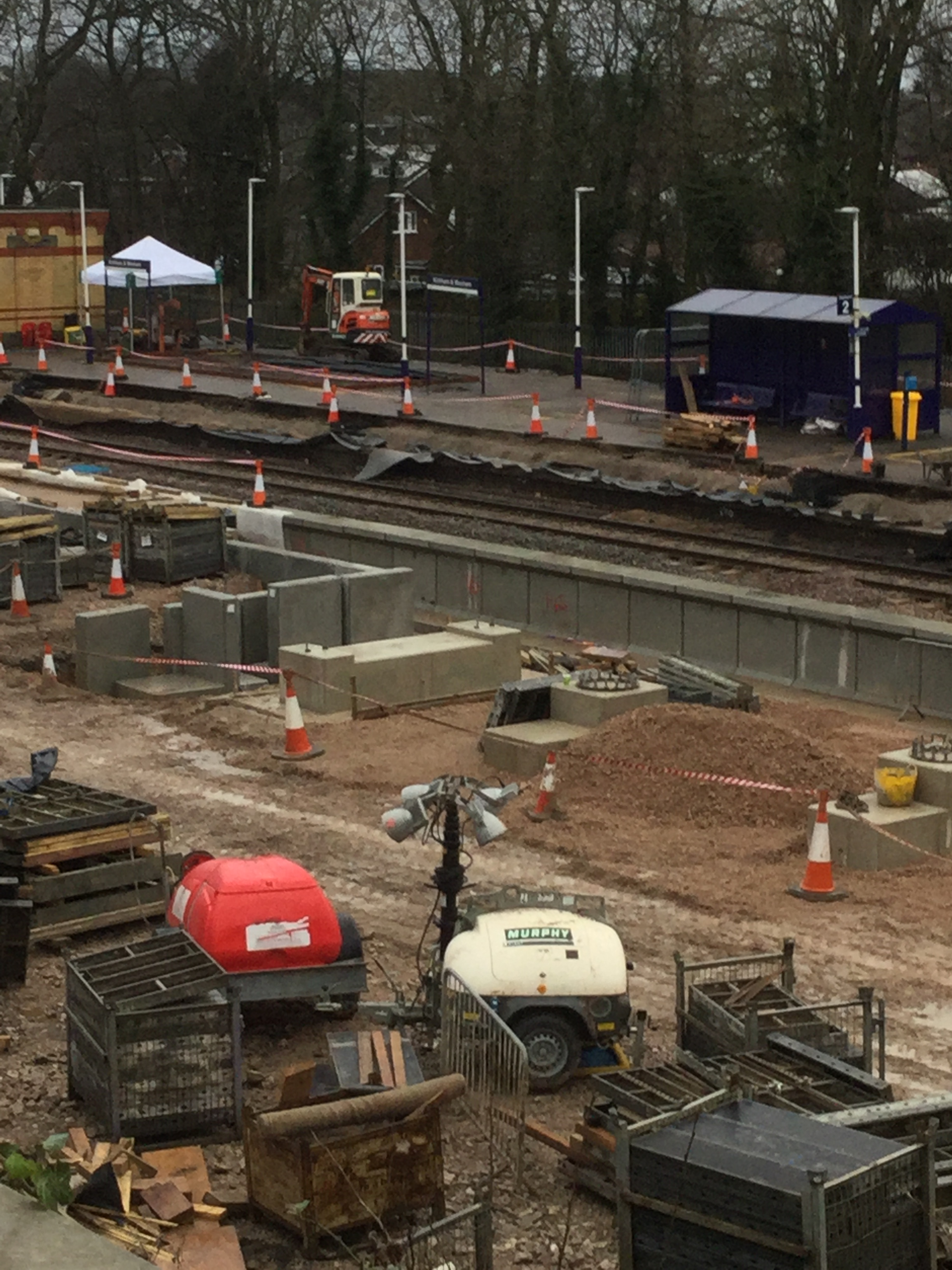
The Kirkham and Wesham rebuild 2017–18

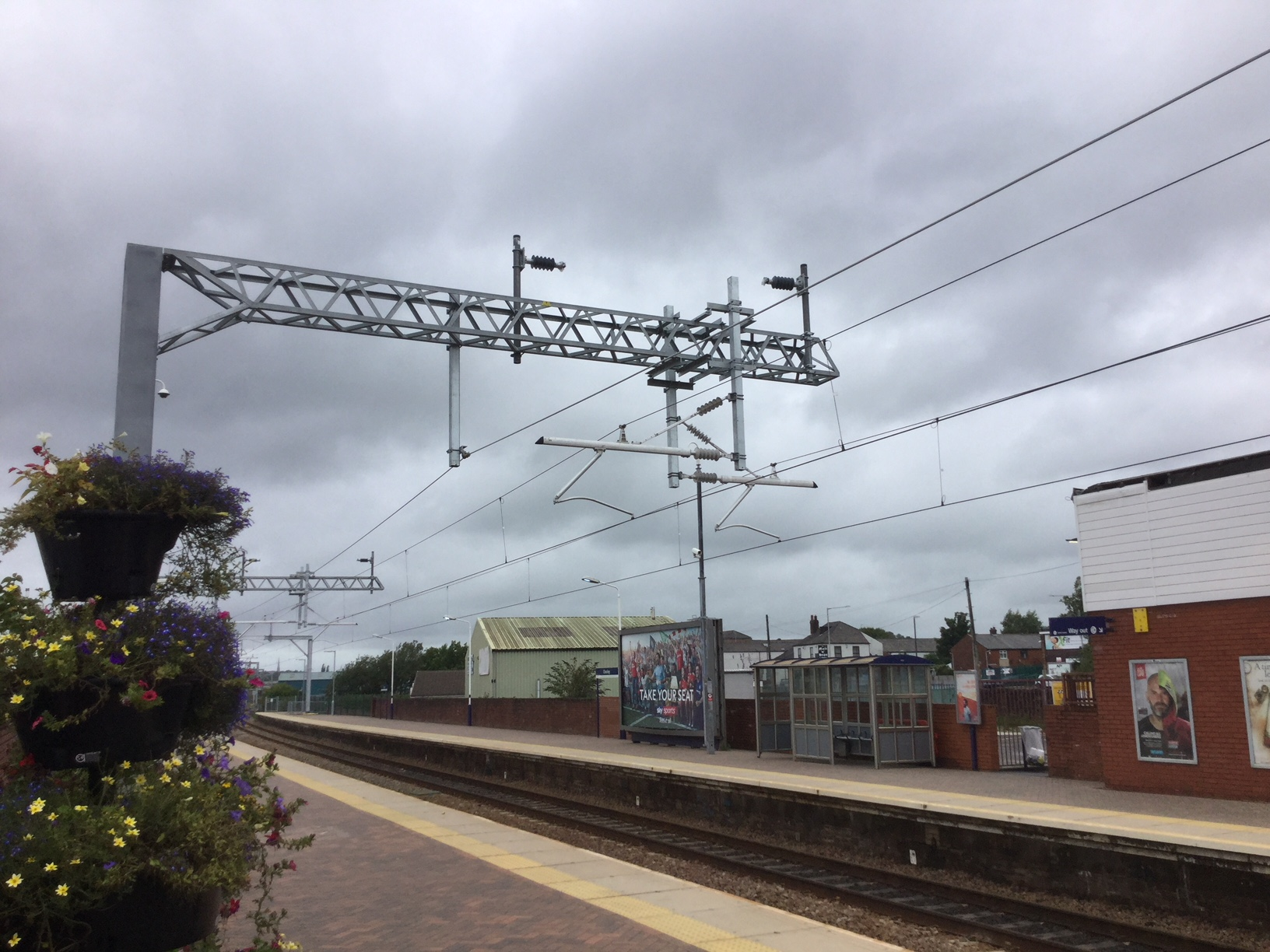
Chorley station electrification

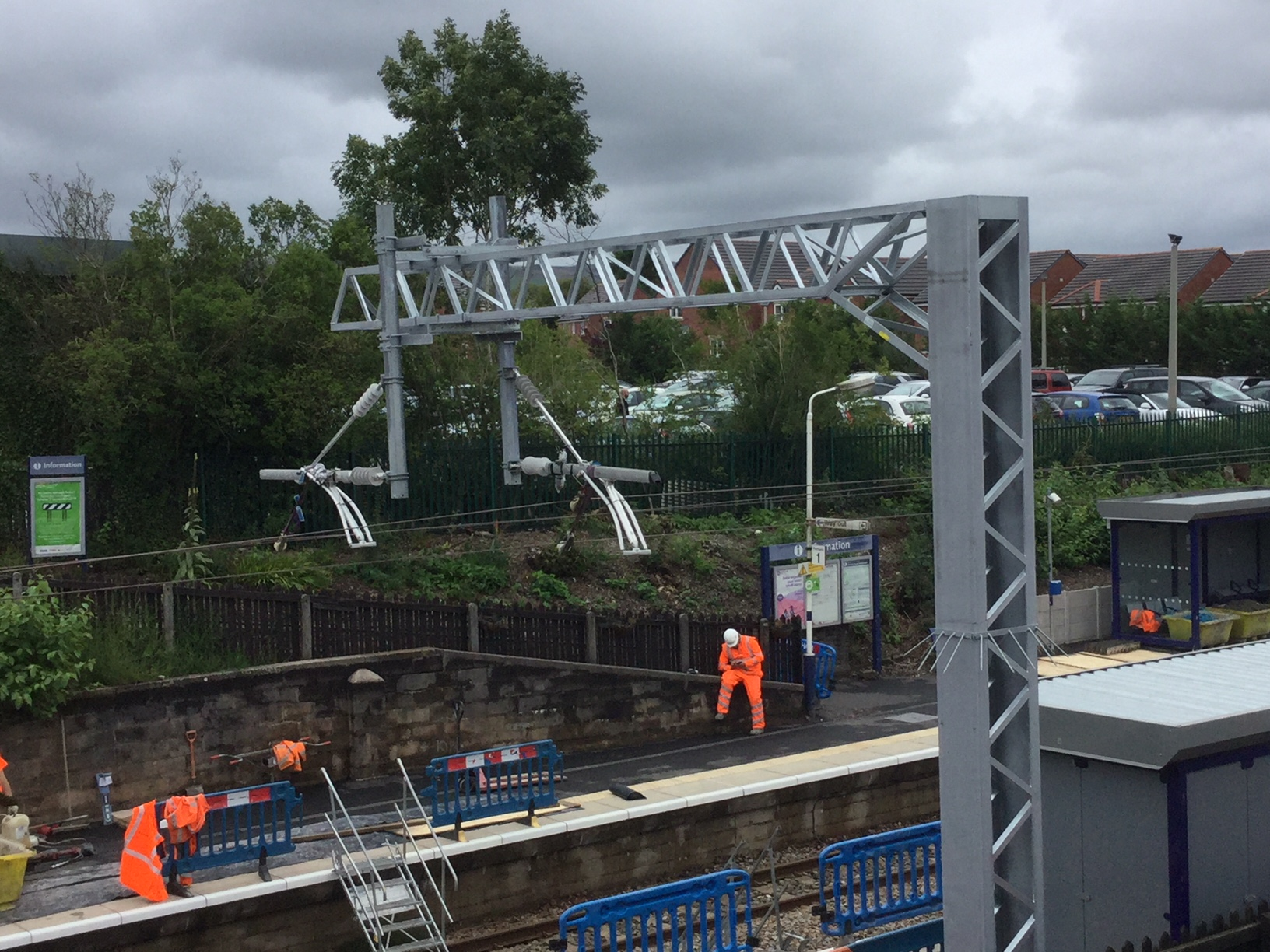
Electrification at Adlington

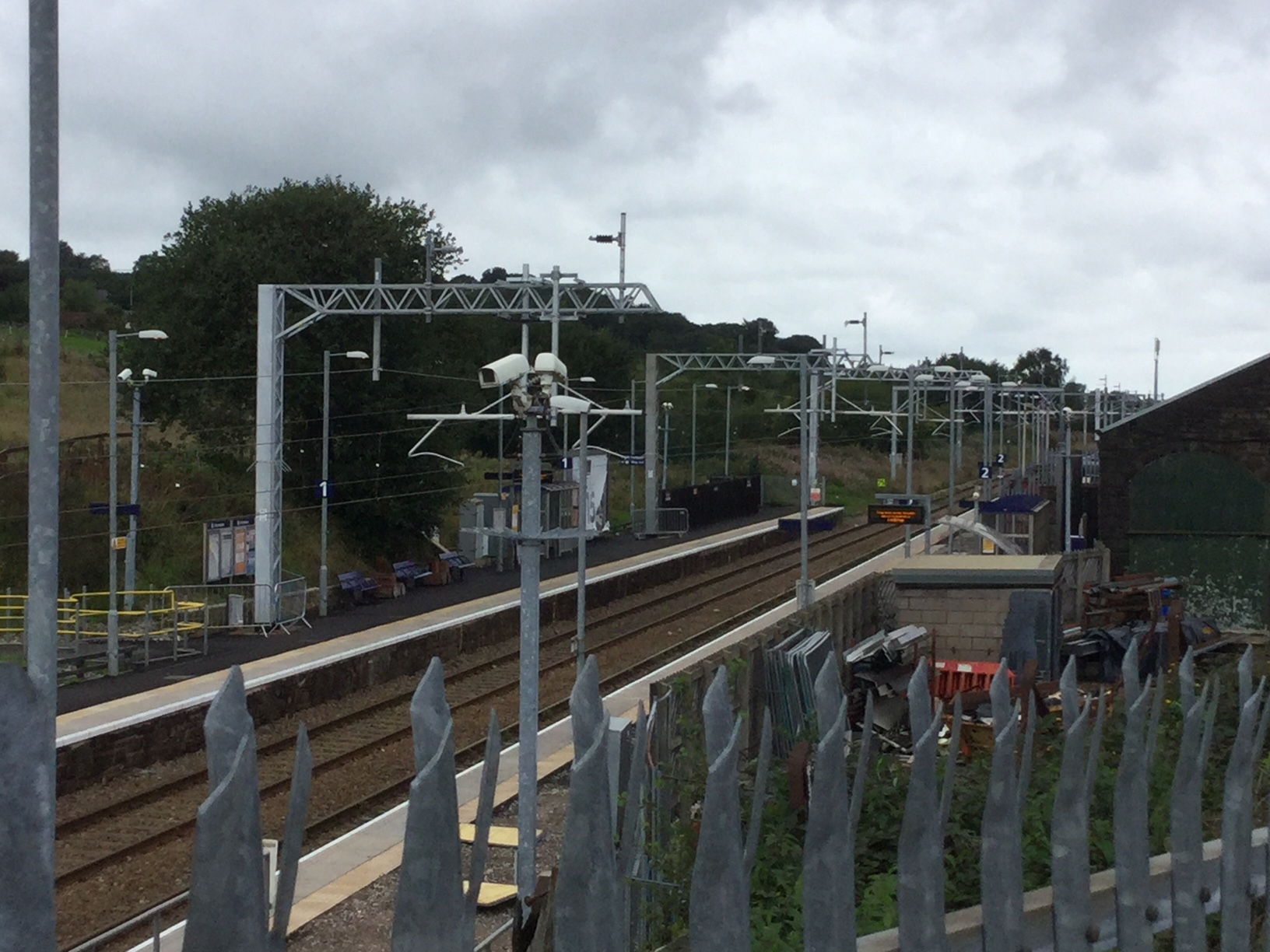
Adlington's gantries

== See also ==
- Campaign to Electrify Britain's Railway
- History of rail transport in Great Britain 1995 to date
- Integrated Rail Plan for the North and Midlands
- List of proposed railway electrification routes in Great Britain
- Northern Hub
- Northern Powerhouse Rail
- Railway electrification in Great Britain
- Transpennine Route Upgrade
- West Coast Main Line route modernisation.
