= Irish Sea Bridge =

Hypothetical rail and road bridge that would span the Irish Sea

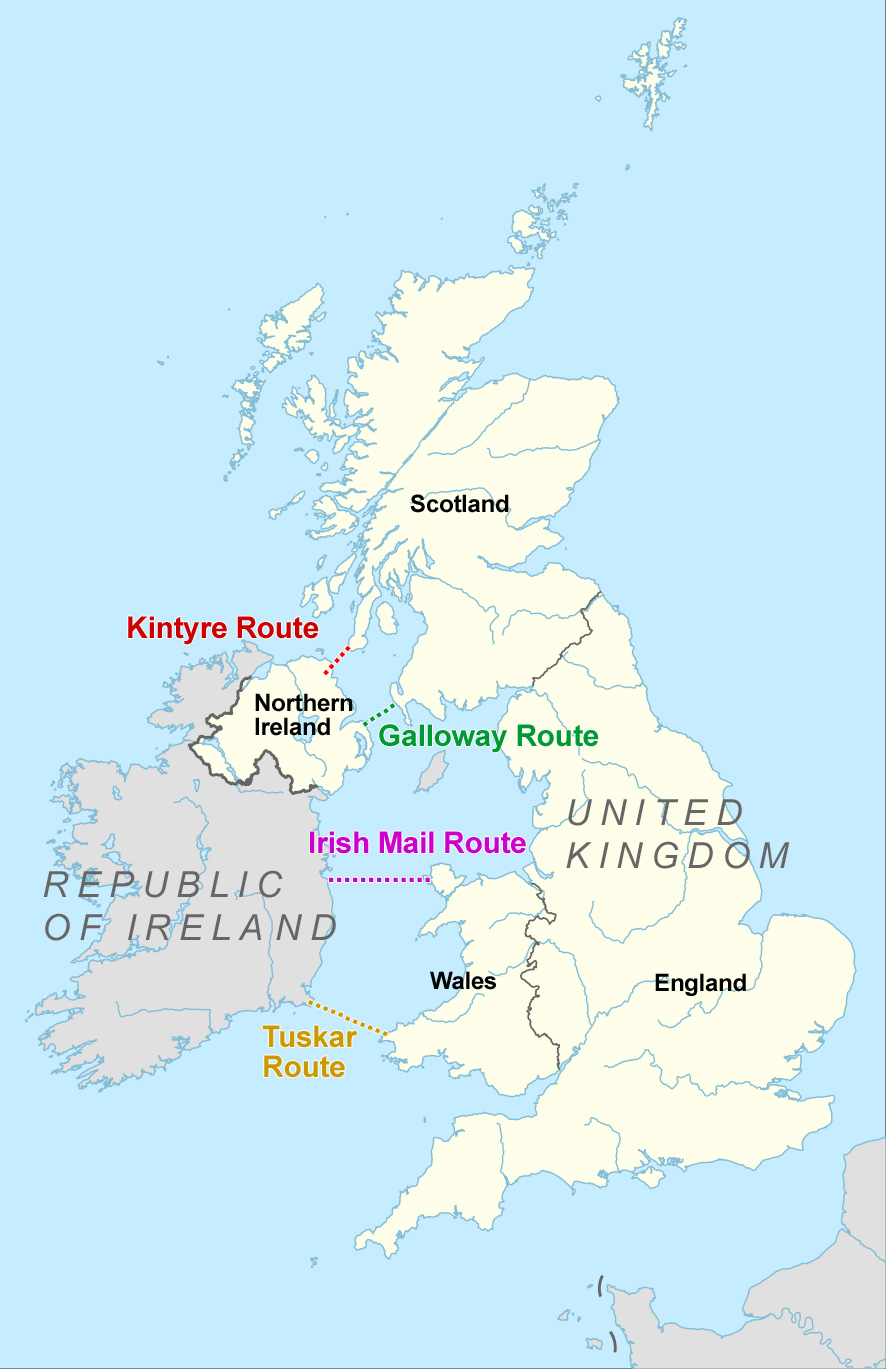
The Irish Sea Bridge is one of a number of proposed Irish Sea fixed crossings (marked here as the green Galloway Route)

The Irish Sea Bridge, sometimes called the Celtic Crossing by the media, is a hypothetical rail and road bridge that would span the Irish Sea and connect the island of Ireland to the island of Great Britain. It is one of a number of such proposed fixed sea links across Ireland and Britain. The bridge's length would depend upon the route taken; one such route, known as the Galloway route, would cross the North Channel, close to that taken by an existing ferry service, between Portpatrick in Dumfries and Galloway, and Larne in County Antrim, Northern Ireland, a distance of 45 kilometres (28 mi).

The concept of an Irish Sea Bridge had been proposed many times since the Victorian Era. In 2018 Professor Alan Dunlop at the University of Liverpool revived the idea. By February 2020, British government officials began scoping the possible route and type of crossing. Particular risks to such a project include the depth of North Channel and the presence of a large underwater munitions dump at Beaufort's Dyke. It was suggested that these problems would be mitigated in part by the construction of a tunnelled section.

A full feasibility study was published in November 2021. It estimated that a bridge would cost £335 billion, and a tunnel £209 billion. The study concluded that the technology exists to build either, noting that any bridge would be "the longest span bridge built to date" and the tunnel would be "the longest undersea tunnel ever built".

== Concept ==
=== Proposal ===
The idea for a Scotland to Northern Ireland Bridge, sometimes branded in the press as the "Celtic Crossing" or "Irish Sea Bridge", was revived in January 2018 by Professor Alan Dunlop of the University of Liverpool. He proposed a combined road and rail crossing between Portpatrick, in Dumfries and Galloway, and Larne in Northern Ireland, claiming that his rough estimates showed it would cost no more than £20 billion, and that "the coastline between each country is more sheltered and the waterway better protected" than the English Channel, where, as Foreign Secretary, Boris Johnson had (then) recently speculated on a possible £120 billion bridge. He suggested that his concept would create a 'Celtic powerhouse' due to the potential for an increase in trade between the two countries, and the increase in investment from the construction of the project. He presented his concept in greater detail, though with his still massively underestimated £20 billion construction cost, at the September 2018 Urbanism at Borders Conference, in Aberdeen.

=== Engineering ===
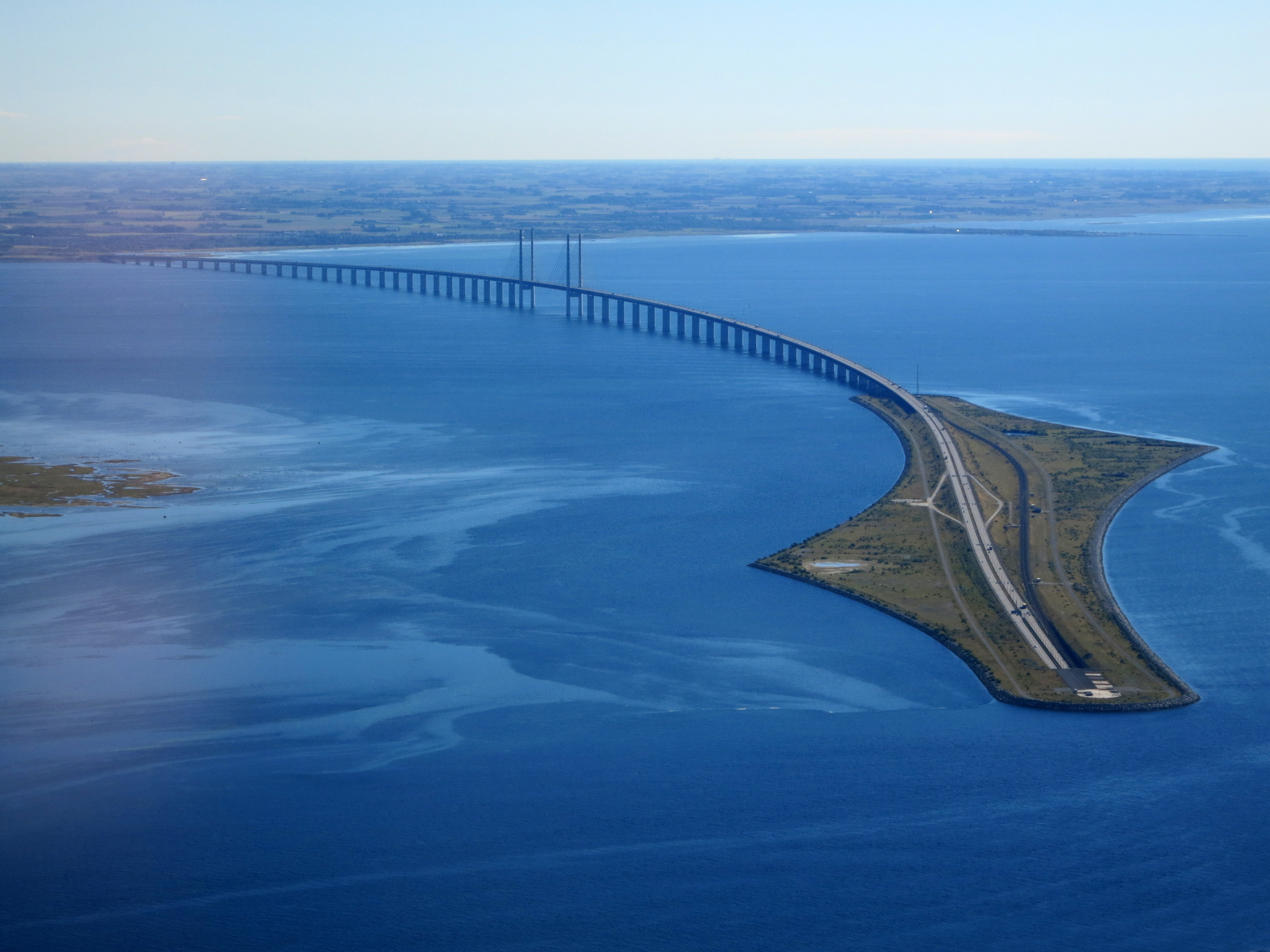
The Øresund Bridge between Sweden and Denmark has been considered as a possible model for the Irish Sea Bridge

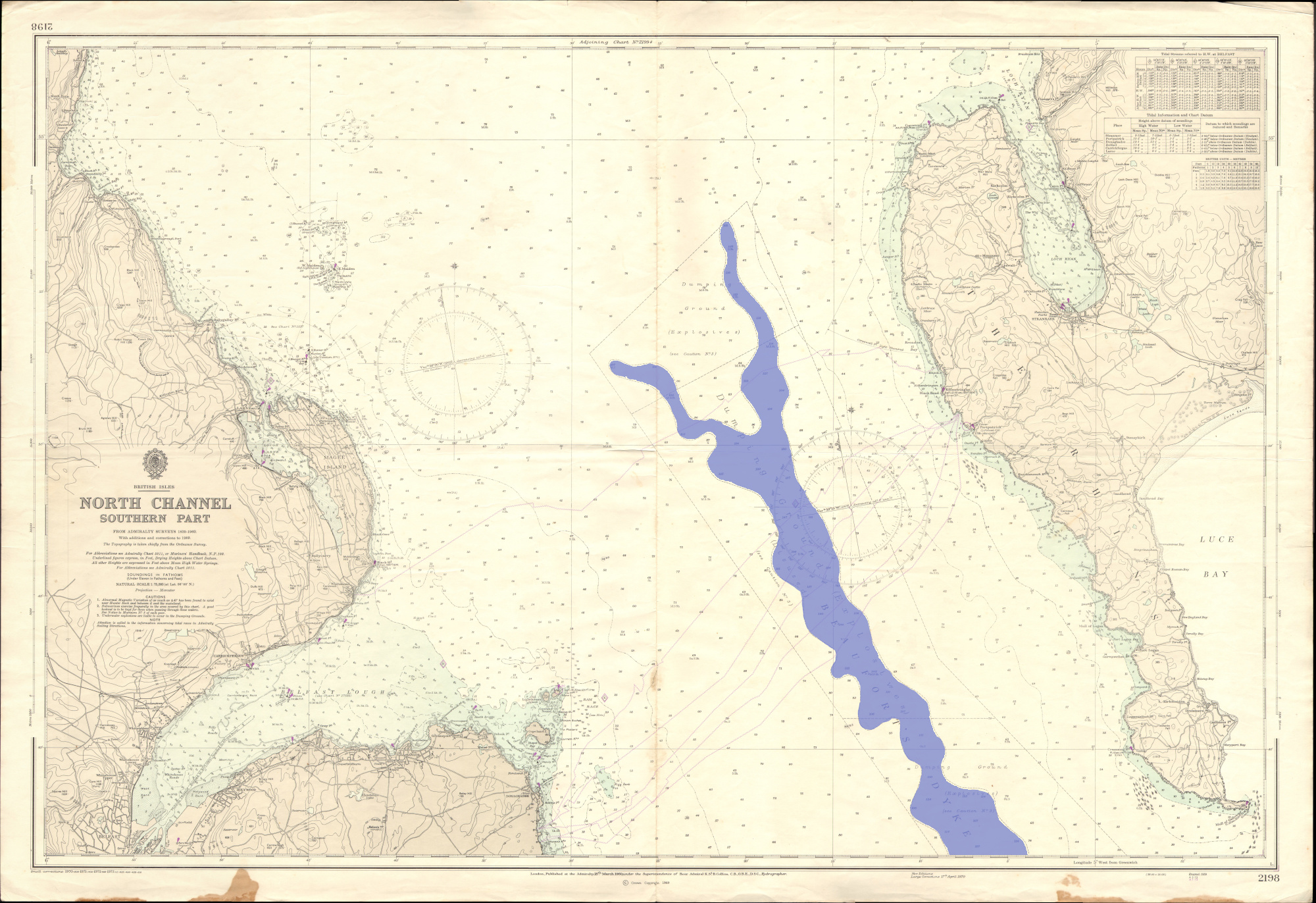
Beaufort's Dyke, showing the position of the munitions dump, highlighted in blue on an Admiralty chart published in 1969. Depth in fathoms

Proposals to overcome the problems presented by the Beaufort's Dyke Trench, if it could not be cleared, include floating the bridge on 500 m (1,640 ft) deep connecting sea orbs connected to the seabed with tension cables, similar to those used on bridges in Norway.

Professor Dunlop also suggested that the construction processes used for the Øresund Bridge be looked at as a model for such a bridge. The Øresund bridge had, by 2018, provided a £10 bn return on its initial investment. However, it has 3 million people living within 25 miles (40 km) either end of the bridge, and the North Channel does not have a local population of this size. Furthermore the Øresund Bridge was built in waters not over 10 m (33 ft) deep.

Other suggestions for overcoming issues linked to Beaufort's Dyke have subsequently included a partially tunneled section (similar to that of the Øresund Bridge), or incorporating artificial islands to link tunnels to the bridge.

It has also been suggested that such a bridge or tunnel would be able to link up with the Edinburgh and Glasgow Railway and a possible Belfast to Dublin high speed rail being studied for viability as of 2020. The different rail gauges in Great Britain (1,435 mm (4 ft 8 1/2 in)) and the island of Ireland (1,600 mm (5 ft 3 in)) are mutually incompatible however, so this would have to be resolved with a break of gauge system such as transshipment, bogie exchange, dual gauge rolling stock or Gauge Changer axles such as the Talgo-RD system amongst others. Rail industry leaders in the UK's High Speed Rail Group have demonstrated support for the tunnel proposal.

By October 2018, the first concept images of the proposed bridge had been released.

=== Economics ===
The National, a Scottish newspaper, suggested the idea "would be a huge boost to the economies of both countries, opening up trade and putting the otherwise neglected far South West of Scotland in the centre of a major route". It did, however, also state that, "There would have to be massive investment in infrastructure to upgrade the road and rail connections, especially on the Scottish side. The main roads leading to Stranraer are narrow, twisting, and unsuited for the amount of traffic that they currently have, never mind the increased traffic that would be generated by a fixed link. The single rail line from Ayr to Stranraer would have to be upgraded and electrified, and the rail link from Stranraer to Dumfries reinstated". It has been suggested that the A75 road would need to be upgraded to handle the additional traffic; however, the Scottish government and Department for Transport had already received local requests to hold consultation on upgrading this road. In terms of its potential to link up communities and improve infrastructure Professor Dunlop has also noted the similarities between such a bridge and the Norwegian Coastal Highway, which forms a 680-mile (1,090 km) route crossing 20 fjords between Kristiansand and Trondheim, with 9 ferries but suggested to be using floating bridges and tunnels at a cost of around £30bn.

Further support has come from the fact that this part of Scotland has a large number of established ports and harbours, meaning it could form an epicenter for trade to America, Canada, the Caribbean and Scandinavia for both Scotland and Northern Ireland, as well as the UK, Ireland and Europe more generally. It was also suggested that depending on the relationship of Scotland and Northern Ireland with the EU after Brexit the EU could use the port at Cockenzie and the Scotland-Ireland bridge as a means of transporting EU goods to Ireland via the Netherlands. By early October 2019 it was reported that the Scottish government had plans to re-purpose the nearby disused port at Stranraer as a lorry park in the event of a "No Deal" Brexit, due to concerns about traffic flows from Northern Ireland. It has been suggested that a bridge could help alleviate some of the potential pressure of traffic flows.

Commentators in the i newspaper also suggested that such a bridge would have the potential to create a "tourism corridor" between Northern Ireland and Scotland. It has also been suggested that with increasing demand for travel between Great Britain and the island of Ireland (London to Dublin being the busiest air route in Europe), that the bridge could have a positive environmental impact by reducing the demand for flights.

The Glasgow Urban Laboratory had published a report suggesting that a high-speed rail link connecting Edinburgh to Dublin via Glasgow and Belfast would be "transformative" for the economies of both Scotland and Ireland saying, "fast-track rail links, both within Scotland and linking to other countries, and an updated road system, are priorities". Senior economist Esmond Birnie at the University of Ulster claimed that "Recent economic theory has emphasised the advantages of "agglomeration" arising from faster, cheaper transport: bigger and better labour markets and increased networking between firms" and put the annual benefit from the bridge in the hundreds of millions.

== Political and public support ==
So far the project has at various times received support from senior politicians in both the UK and in Ireland, and across a number of political parties. The project has also received support from newspapers, periodicals, and engineering and logistics trade bodies.

=== Support ===
The project was first endorsed in late February 2018 by SNP Scottish Brexit Minister Michael Russell MSP, who when addressing Ireland's Seanad joint committee on European Union affairs stated that "I think it's a great idea, it would open up my constituency and that's a good headline to see. There is a lot of talking to be done about that but I think it is important that talking starts. I know recent coverage indicates that it should happen".

In February 2018, Irish Minister for Foreign Affairs and Trade, Simon Coveney, publicly called for a feasibility study into the bridge during an address at Chatham House following a meeting with Foreign Secretary Boris Johnson, suggesting it was a means of nurturing the relations between the United Kingdom and Ireland, despite the challenges presented.

By March 2018, the idea appeared to have the full support of the Scottish government, with a spokesman telling the BBC that it intended to "initiate discussions" on the bridge with both parties in Belfast, and the government of Ireland. and that Transport Scotland officials would be conducting talks with their counterparts in Northern Ireland. Mike Russell MSP said he had been in touch with Professor Alan Dunlop to discuss the bridge, claiming that "A bridge, together with better road links to the central belt, would open up Argyll in a dramatic new way" and that he was "keen to see public bodies investigate the feasibility of such a link". He went on to claim that Highlands and Islands Enterprise and Transport Scotland were willing to contribute funds towards a feasibility study.

By April 2018, the Mayor of Mid and East Antrim had extended an invitation, on behalf of the council, to the relevant bodies in the government to further explore Larne as the possible end site for the bridge. The Mayor cited the short distance to Belfast, as well as the county's extensive film, tourism and leisure industries as reasons for consideration. On 25 April 2018 Ards and North Down Borough Council voted to write to the Scottish government, the Secretary of State for Northern Ireland, and the Department for Infrastructure requesting the east coast of the borough also be considered as a possible end site for the bridge. The council's official opposition had objected to the request, claiming that the council should instead support the claim of neighbouring county Mid and East Antrim, as they believe the infrastructure already exists in Larne, while Donaghadee would be unprepared for the impact of such a bridge. The Belfast Telegraph suggested that this was reminiscent of ancient rivalries between the local ports. A spokesman for the Scottish government suggested that speculation on possible impacts on specific sites was premature as the project, including the design for the crossing, was still in its early stages. A spokesman for the Scottish government had previously stated that "Given the scale of any such fixed link, it is important that all options are fully considered". In July, Arlene Foster, then former First Minister in Northern Ireland, agreed that there appeared to be a growing support for the bridge in Northern Ireland.

In August 2018, Jane Morrice, former Deputy Speaker to the Northern Irish Assembly, suggested that funding possibilities for the bridge were "vast", with private investors seeking infrastructure projects and investment from China. She also suggested funding could be raised from "EU sources [which] could include the cross-border INTERREG programme, the European Investment Bank, the TransEuropean Network and HORIZON 2020. The EU PEACE programme could be another valuable source because the bridge would still respect the Good Friday Agreement by promoting peace and prosperity in the region." She claimed that "The political and symbolic importance of such a link can't be underestimated, and the economic, social and cultural advantages could be significant".

In 2018, Secretary of State for Northern Ireland Karen Bradley responding to questions in parliament suggested that the bridge was being discussed by the cabinet.

In 2019, First Minister of Scotland Nicola Sturgeon spoke out in favour of the bridge, stating that "Whether it's around a bridge or in other ways strengthening the relationship between Scotland, the north of Ireland and the Republic of Ireland is a big priority for my government."

As part of his campaign for the 2019 Conservative Party leadership election, Boris Johnson suggested that he supported the construction of the bridge, describing himself as "an enthusiast for that idea", and adding that he believed it would be best "championed by local people with local consent and interest, backed by local business".

In September 2019, when asked to comment on the project, the Secretary of State for Business, Energy and Industrial Strategy Andrea Leadsom said the UK had "amazing ambitions for the future".

The Independent's Europe Correspondent suggested that the UK was lagging behind by not taking the construction of the bridge seriously, suggesting that other countries had already invested in such bridges. The newspaper cited the example of Japan's islands of Honshu and Hokkaido, which are linked by the Seikan Tunnel which exceeds the length of the proposed bridge. It also cited the examples of the Fehmarn Belt Fixed Link and the Helsinki-Tallinn Tunnel as evidence that the UK was lagging behind comparative European nations.

While addressing supporters for the bridge in Northern Ireland, Prime Minister Boris Johnson is quoted as having said "With infrastructure projects, finance is not the issue, the issue is political will, the issue is getting the business community to see that this could be something that works for them, the issue is getting popular demand and popular consent for a great infrastructure project – and that is why you need Stormont."

In late September 2019, a group of engineers wrote to National Geographic magazine agreeing that it was "technically possible and far from unrealistic to build" the bridge.

In October 2019, Irish Taoiseach Leo Varadkar said "Prime Minister Johnson is genuinely interested in taking a serious look at this idea of building a bridge between Antrim and Scotland...I know people dismiss it, but I don't. It needs to be looked at. It needs to be at least examined". He later added "I know people dismiss these things out of hand, but they used to dismiss the Channel Tunnel as well – the idea of building a tunnel between France and Britain – and I know what I see when I see a bridge tunnel between Denmark and Sweden, when you fly over New Orleans and you see 110 miles of bridge, it's extraordinary".

In March 2020, Secretary of State for Scotland Alister Jack told the Scottish Parliament that he supported a fixed link.

In October 2020, specialist vehicle suppliers looked at which potential future engineering innovations would be most welcomed by truck drivers with the Irish Sea Bridge being one of the most supported.

In February 2021, it was reported that both transport industry think tank Greengauge 21 and rail industry leaders in The High Speed Rail Group supported a fixed link.

=== Opposition ===
Other politicians and public officials have opposed the bridge, such as Conservative Party MP Simon Hoare and Ulster Unionist Party leader Steve Aiken. Minister of Infrastructure Nichola Mallon of the Social Democratic and Labour Party has also expressed opposition to the proposals. Mallon's counterpart, and former Scottish Transport Secretary Michael Matheson has described the concept as a "vanity project", and stated that it would not proceed within Prime Minister Boris Johnson's lifetime.

In July 2021, Boris Johnson's own former Chief Advisor Dominic Cummings controversially claimed that the plan did not have a credible basis beyond Johnson's desire to appear to be "getting things done". In a BBC interview, he stated that "He didn't have a plan ... he didn't have an agenda. You know, the Prime Minister's only agenda is buy more trains, buy more buses, have more bikes and build the world's most stupid tunnel to Ireland, that's it."

== Issues relating to Beaufort's Dyke ==
In October 2018, MP Paul Girvan, transport spokesman for the DUP, wrote an article in support of the bridge, stating that the munitions dumped in Beaufort's Dyke after World War II, often cited as a hurdle for the bridge project, are already washing up on beaches in Ireland and the UK and so a cleanup operation was already necessary regardless of whether the bridge was going to be built.

In November 2018, Secretary of State for Northern Ireland Karen Bradley indicated the government was aware of the issues, such as munitions and waste, regarding the seabed in this area, and that it was being discussed by cabinet as part of wider discussions around the bridge.

In November 2020, a study carried out on behalf of the UK & Ireland Nuclear Free Local Authorities (NFLA) found that nuclear waste had been deposited in Beaufort's Dyke, with much of it "short-dumped" outside of the Dyke itself, leading to uncertainty over how much radioactive material lies in the trench. NFLA campaigners described the report as "alarming" and called on authorities in Britain and Ireland to review measures designed to protect ferries, oil tankers and fishing trawlers that operate near the Dyke. A British Geological Survey also confirmed that explosions generated by degrading munitions are a relatively frequent occurrence. This prompted calls for authorities to clear the Dyke.

In November 2020, further support came for a fixed link to reduce sea traffic and avoid the issue of ship collisions with submarines navigating near the dyke for testing. This followed a report from the Marine Accident Investigation Branch which reported an incident of a passenger ferry almost colliding with a submarine.

In November 2021, South Scotland MSP Emma Harper sought agreement from the UK government that a full safety assessment would be carried out of Beaufort's Dyke, and asked for assurances that after the A75 road upgrade and the possible construction of a new nuclear power station in England, the UK Government would not once again consider Beaufort's Dyke as a nuclear waste dumping site.

== Development ==
In 2019, Boris Johnson had requested civil servants in the Treasury and Department for Transport undertake a cost and risk analysis of the proposed bridge, with special attention to be paid to possible funding options. The Department for Transport had reportedly already produced a factual paper on the subject for a former transport secretary.

By February 2020, British government officials had been tasked with scoping out the full cost of building the bridge, though Number 10 would not confirm how many civil servants were working on the project.

In June 2020, Downing Street confirmed that the Prime Minister Boris Johnson remained committed to the project. Following a freedom of information request questions were raised by the media as to whether the project had been shelved while civil servants were focused elsewhere during the COVID-19 pandemic. A Cabinet Office spokesman responded that the bridge continued to be considered "at a very early stage", but that it remained a consideration as part of many "general options to improve connectivity between the nations of the UK". The Prime Minister's spokesman later confirmed that the government remained committed to the bridge, stating "We have commissioned some internal work and we are looking at the feasibility of it, there's no change to that. The prime minister's views on this subject are very well known."

At the end of June Prime Minister Boris Johnson's government announced that the funding for the bridge was being considered as part of their post-COVID-19 plan to revitalize the economy by increasing and improving the UK's infrastructure.

== Hendy review ==
In October 2020, it was announced that Sir Peter Hendy would lead an independent review into the feasibility of various projects designed to improve the UK's infrastructure. This would include the Irish Sea Bridge. The analysis on the bridge would be undertaken by Douglas Oakervee. Oakervee had expressed concern that since the collapse of Flybe there are fewer opportunities to travel from Great Britain to the island of Ireland and that a rail bridge or tunnel could do something about the issue.

In March 2021, Sir Peter Hendy's interim report recommended a full feasibility study be undertaken by engineers into the bridge. As a result, two engineers assessed the potential project, to build an outline of cost and timescale and the associated works needed. The two engineers appointed were Douglas Oakervee, (former chairman of HS2 and Crossrail), and Gordon Masterson, (former vice-president of Jacobs Engineering). The full cost of the review was £896,681 according to figures from the Department for Transport.

In September 2021, unidentified sources within the British Treasury informed the Financial Times that regardless of the findings of the feasibility study the bridge or tunnel would likely be one of the early casualties of the spending review led by then Chancellor of the Exchequer Rishi Sunak describing it to be "dead, at least for now" as a project.

The feasibility study was published in November 2021. It estimated that a bridge would cost £335 billion, and a tunnel £209 billion. The report concluded that the cost of the fixed link, in either form, was "impossible to justify", and though noted "the economic viability of the provision of such a link is not within the scope of [the] study", recommended that "further work on the fixed link should not progress beyond this feasibility study". The study estimated that the bridge would take thirty years to construct, and would require "very significant [road and rail] works" on either side.

The report did note that the project would "likely give rise to more than 35,000 new jobs and apprenticeships for the design and construction phase alone" and could "revitalise parts of the United Kingdom's industry". From an environmental standpoint it was noted that the bridge should be "carbon neutral within 40 to 60 years after construction", and as a "bridge could be used as a platform to generate renewable energy from wind, tidal and solar sources", while as a tunnel "could be a heat source through the tunnel lining for its whole length". It was also suggested that a fixed link "would allow cabled and piped utilities and services to replace current seabed crossings with enhanced reliability and reduced maintenance".

== See also ==
- Proposed British Isles fixed sea link connections
- Øresund Bridge between Sweden and Denmark
- List of longest bridges
- High Speed 2
- Menai suspension bridge
- London Britannia Airport
- Giant's Causeway
- Floating suspension bridge
