= Proposed British Isles fixed sea link connections =

Proposed Ireland-Great Britain tunnels or bridges

There are a number of proposed fixed connections, historic and contemporary—road or rail, bridge or tunnel—designed to connect the islands of Ireland and Great Britain, connect the island of Great Britain to mainland Europe, as well as to build other connections amongst the smaller islands in the British Islands.

== Proposed fixed sea links between Great Britain and Ireland ==
=== Possible routes ===
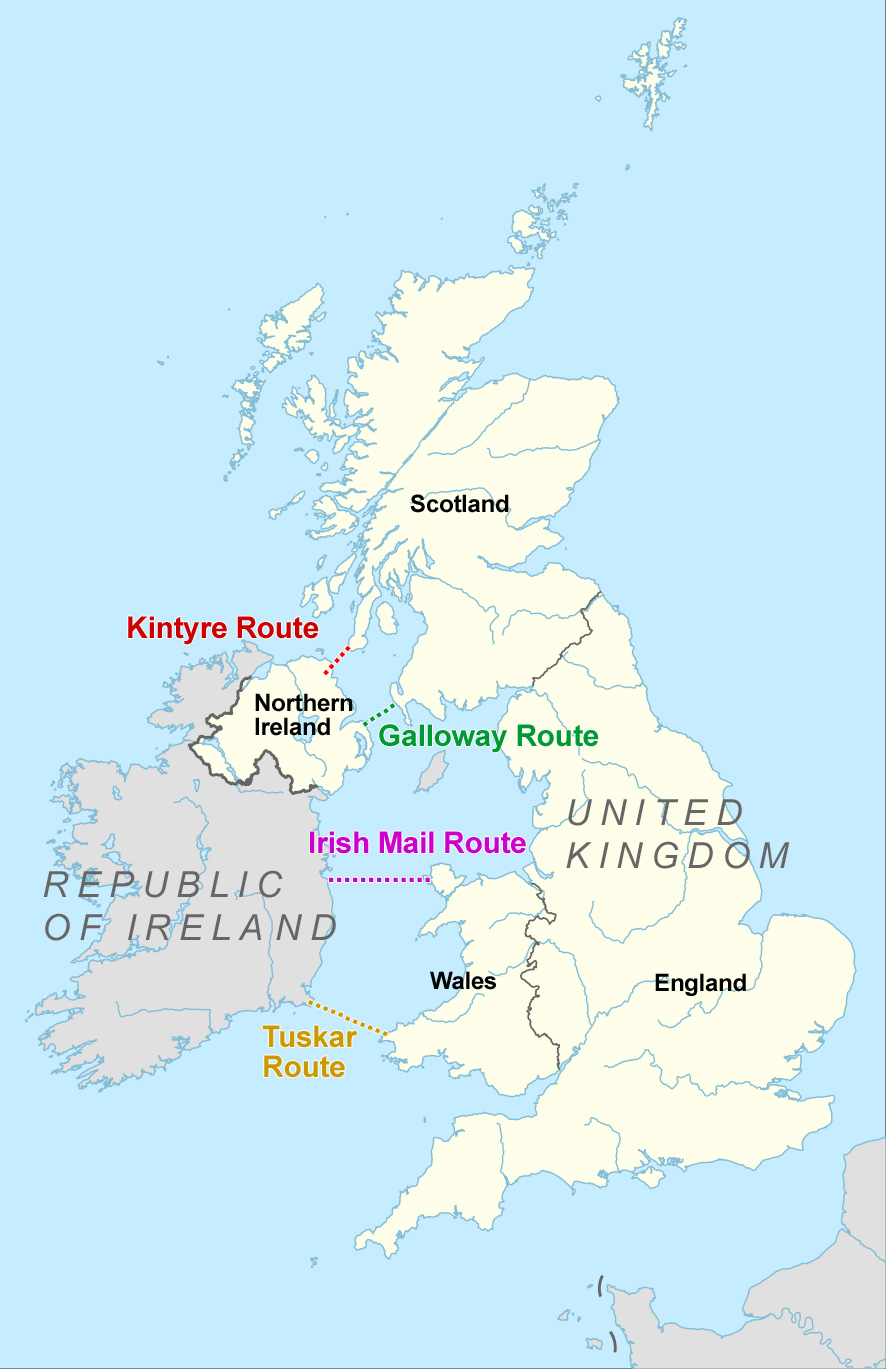
Possible Irish Sea connections

==== North Channel (Galloway) route ====
This route, a distance of 21 miles (34 km), has been proposed variously as either a tunnel or a bridge. A 2010 report by the Centre for Cross Border Studies estimated building a bridge between Galloway and Ulster would cost just under £20.5 billion. The proposal would see passengers board trains in Glasgow then cross on the bridge via Stranraer and alight in Belfast or Dublin. A longer bridge already exists between Shanghai and Ningbo in East China. Some political parties in Northern Ireland have included the bridge in their manifesto for some time. However, because of the Beaufort's Dyke sea trench which is approximately 1,000 feet (300 m) deep, this route would be deeper than the southern routes between Wales and Ireland. The sea trench was also used for dumping munitions after World War II, and so would require an expensive cleanup operation. Ronnie Hunter, former chairman of the Institute of Civil Engineers Scotland, suggested that the project was a "stretch but doable". He cited the lack of "soft rock, the chalk and sandstone" as a challenge compared to the construction of the Channel Tunnel. He also suggested that the change in rail gauge between Ireland and Great Britain might pose further concerns. Such a project was considered by railway engineer Luke Livingston Macassey in the 1890s as "a rail link using either a tunnel, a submerged "tubular bridge" or a solid causeway". The north channel crossing was the subject of a 2020 study by the United Kingdom government.

==== North Channel (Kintyre) route ====
This is the shortest sea route at around 12 miles (20 km), between Kintyre and County Antrim, but would include either the three hour drive on the A83 road around Loch Fyne and over the landslip-prone Rest and Be Thankful mountain pass, or two further new sea crossings via either the Isle of Arran or Cowal. If building this sea crossing, the road must be improved. The distance between Kintyre and Glasgow is around 140 miles (230 km), reducible to 110 miles (180 km) with a straighter road (preferable motorway) and a bridge over Loch Fyne.

==== Isle of Man route ====
In February of 2021, many organisations reported on the Boris Johnson led British Government reviewing the feasibility of an Irish Sea crossing to link the island of Great Britain to the Isle of Man and potentially on to Ireland across the Irish Sea. The Eastern basin of the Irish Sea between the Isle of Man and Great Britain is significantly shallower than the Western side. This would make modern tunnelling techniques such as the Fehmarnbelt tunnel between Denmark and Germany feasible.

==== Irish Mail route ====
This route (from Dublin to Holyhead in Anglesey, Wales), named for the Irish Mail, a train route that operated London Euston to Holyhead, that connected with Dublin via ferry. would be about 50 miles (81 km) long. Avoiding the Saint George's Channel immediately to the south of the route would keep the sea depth less than 300 feet (100 m).

==== Tuskar route ====
The Institution of Engineers of Ireland's 2004 Vision of Transport in Ireland in 2050 imagines a tunnel to be built between the ports of Fishguard and Rosslare. This route would be approximately twice the distance of the English Channel Tunnel at 45 miles (72 km). A new container port on the Shannon Estuary linking a freight line to Europe is included. This report also includes ideas for a Belfast–Dublin–Cork high-speed train, and for a new freight line from Rosslare to Shannon.

=== Proposal history ===
==== Pre-20th century proposals ====
The failure of the Union Bill 1799 (which succeeded, the next year, as the Act of Union 1800) prompted a satirical description of a proposal by "architect" William Pitt "to build a bridge from Holyhead to the Hill of Howth."

As part of the unionist movement, various roads were built across Great Britain heading towards Ireland; in 1803 William Madocks started building earthworks for a road to Porthdinllaen; this was rejected by Parliament in 1810 in favour of a London to Holyhead road, which was authorised in 1815, built by Thomas Telford, and opened in 1826.

In 1866, Captain W. Macbay published a pamphlet titled 'The United Kingdom, Really United, (Ireland to England;), How to obtain good and cheap beef and unfailing crops'. Captain Macbay's reasoning for the necessity of a fixed Irish Sea connection (either by tunnel, bridge or causeway) are summarised in seven points.

1. Increasing Food Security for Animal feed between Great Britain and Ireland
2. Mutual increase of agricultural value between the islands and diminishing the risk of disease via sea routes
3. Increase the value of Irish land
4. Encourage Scottish and English travel and immigration to Ireland
5. Increase investment into Ireland
6. Provide a relief to the large population of incarcerated people by providing a massive undertaking for prison labour
7. Reduce the risk of armed revolt from Ireland and improve the speed at which soldiers can be deployed to Ireland

Between 1886 and 1900, proposals for a link to Scotland were "seriously explored by engineers, industrialists, and Unionist politicians". In 1885, Irish Builder and Engineer said a tunnel under the Irish Sea had been discussed "for some time back". In 1890, engineer Luke Livingston Macassey outlined a Stranraer–Belfast link by tunnel, submerged "tubular bridge", or solid causeway. In 1897 a British firm applied for £15,000 towards the cost of carrying out borings and soundings in the North Channel to see if a tunnel between Ireland and Scotland was viable. The link would have been of immense commercial benefit, was significant strategically and would have meant faster transatlantic travel from the United Kingdom, via Galway and other ports in Ireland. When Hugh Arnold-Foster asked in the Commons in 1897 about a North Channel tunnel, Arthur Balfour said "the financial aspects ... are not of a very promising character".

==== 20th century proposal ====
In 1915, a tunnel was proposed by Gershom Stewart as a defence against a German U-boat blockade of Ireland but dismissed by H. H. Asquith as "hardly practicable in the present circumstances". In 1918, Stewart proposed that German prisoners of war might dig the tunnel; Bonar Law said the Select Committee on Transport could consider the matter.

The Senate of Northern Ireland debated a North Channel Tunnel on 25 May 1954. In 1956 Harford Hyde, Unionist Westminster MP for North Belfast, raised a motion in the UK House of Commons for a tunnel across the North Channel. In 1980, John Biggs-Davison suggested European Economic Community involvement in a North Channel tunnel; Philip Goodhart said no tunnel was planned.

In 1988, John Wilson, the Irish Minister for Tourism and Transport, said his department estimated an Irish Sea tunnel would cost more than twice as much as the English Channel Tunnel and generate less than one-fifth of the revenue, thus being economically unviable. In 1997–98, the Department of Public Enterprise refused to fund a feasibility study requested by the engineering firm Symonds to build an immersed tube tunnel.

==== 21st century proposal ====
Symonds revived the plan in 2000, with an £8 million feasibility study and a £14 billion construction cost estimate. In 2005, the Irish Minister for Transport said he had not studied A Vision of Transport in Ireland in 2050, published in September 2004 by the Irish Academy of Engineering, a report which included a Wexford–Pembroke tunnel.

The proposal of building a bridge between Northern Ireland and Scotland is supported by members of several UK political parties. DUP MP Sammy Wilson compared the idea to the approved Channel Tunnel and HS2 projects. The party made a feasibility study into a tunnel or enclosed bridge a precondition to coalition support in the event of a hung parliament in the 2015 election, and again reiterated the potential for a sea bridge in January 2018. In January 2018, leading figures in the Democratic Unionist Party revived calls for a bridge or tunnel between Larne in County Antrim and Dumfries and Galloway; the estimated £20 billion cost of the 25-mile (40-kilometre) project would make it among the biggest infrastructure projects in UK history. The link was proposed by Wilson and Simon Hamilton, a former minister for the party in the Stormont administration.

The idea has been further endorsed as a potential solution to boost the economies of Scotland and Northern Ireland after Brexit.

==== Late 2010s "Celtic Crossing" and Stranraer–Larne Sea Tunnel proposal ====
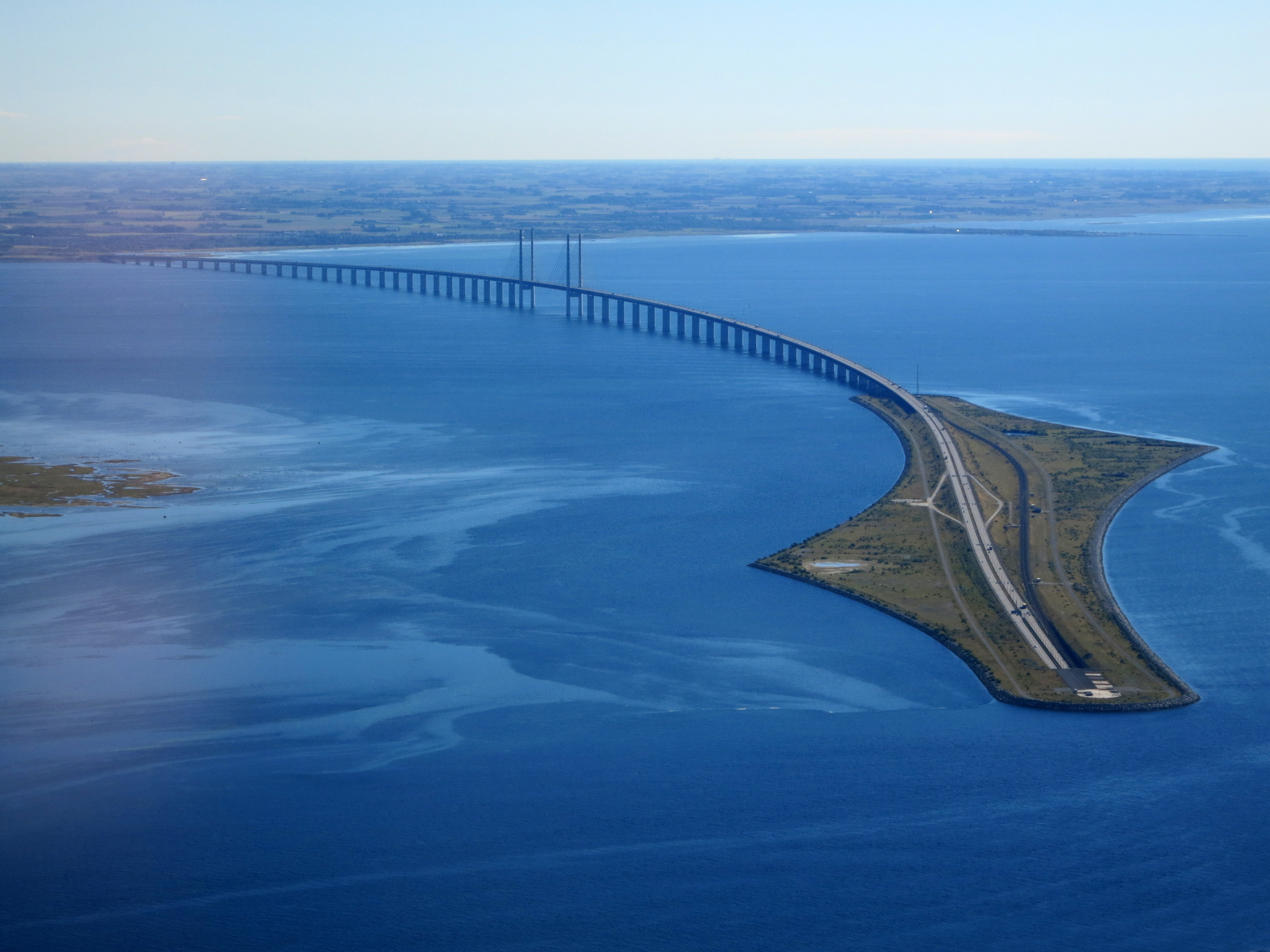
The project has been compared to the Øresund Bridge (pictured), between Sweden and Denmark

The idea for a Scotland to Northern Ireland Bridge, sometimes branded in the press as the Celtic Crossing or Irish Sea Bridge, was revived in 2018, by Professor Alan Dunlop at the University of Liverpool. He proposed a combined road and rail crossing between Portpatrick, in Dumfries and Galloway, and Larne in Northern Ireland, stating that "the coastline between each country is more sheltered and the waterway better protected" than the English Channel, where, as Foreign Secretary, Boris Johnson had proposed a bridge. He suggested that this would create a 'Celtic powerhouse' due to the potential for an increase in trade between the two countries, and the increase in investment from the construction of the project which he put at between £15 billion and £20 billion (a fraction of the £120 billion cost of the proposed bridge over the English Channel).

By 2020, the British government had begun to officially undertake scoping into the possibility of an Irish Sea Bridge.

In February 2021, the Secretary of State for Scotland announced his support for a 25-mile (40 km) sea tunnel from Stranraer to Larne, citing the weather impact on bridge opening and the need to avoid Beaufort's Dyke munitions dump as reasons for favouring a tunnel over a bridge. This proposal also received the support of the High-speed rail in the United Kingdom industry group. In September 2021, it was announced that the entire proposal has been abandoned.

It was also reported in February 2021 that a proposal was considered by the government relating to an underground roundabout to be built under the Isle of Man to link Liverpool, Heysham, Stranraer and Larne.

The Hendy Review published in November 2021 which looked into the proposals claimed that the cost of the fixed link, in either a bridge or tunnel form, was "impossible to justify" in this area given the sea depth, Beaufort's Dyke, and though noted "the economic viability of the provision of such a link is not within the scope of [the] study", recommended that it would regardless take too long to recoup the costs to justify further research.

==== 2020s Holyhead–Dublin tunnel proposal ====
In May 2021 the then British Transport Secretary Grant Shapps discussed the case for a tunnel between Holyhead and Dublin along the Irish Mail route.

The proposed tunnel would be a rail tunnel designed to work in much the same way as the Channel Tunnel, with (on the UK side) a main terminus in Liverpool (similar to London St Pancras International) and another in Anglesey (similar to the Eurotunnel Folkestone Terminal). Via the Northern Powerhouse Rail network and High Speed 2 Phase Two extension, the rail line would be able to connect up with the rest of the UK's High-Speed rail network. On the Irish side the train would terminate in a new purpose-built station in Dublin.

Although the tunnel would be longer than the length of the proposed Irish Sea Bridge, the water in this area is shallower, and there are less obstructions (such as Beaufort's Dyke). The tunnel would be 50 miles in length (approximately twice the length of the Channel Tunnel and around 20 miles longer than the Seikan Tunnel) and the depth would only need to be around 100m (the Ryfylke Tunnel in Norway reaches 292m below sea level). Rail upgrades or a new line would be needed along the north Welsh coast, as the current North Wales Coast Line is not electrified or suitable for high-speed rail. Depending on the route additional crossings may need to be considered over the River Dee. A platform or cofferdam may also be required in the middle of the tunnel to aid with ventilation and access.

Given that this rail link would connect the Republic of Ireland to mainland Europe via the UK, eliminating some of the need for rail and ferry crossings, it has received support from some commentators in Ireland.

== Proposed fixed sea links between Great Britain and France ==
=== Second Channel Tunnel or bridge ===
- The Channel Tunnel operates between Great Britain and France. It is a 31.35 miles (50.45 km) rail tunnel linking Folkestone, Kent, in the United Kingdom, with Coquelles, Pas-de-Calais, near Calais in northern France, beneath the English Channel at the Strait of Dover. At its lowest point, it is 75 m (250 ft) deep. At 23.5 miles (37.9 km), the tunnel has the longest undersea portion of any tunnel in the world, although the Seikan Tunnel in Japan is both longer overall at 33.46 miles (53.85 km) and deeper at 240 metres (790 ft) below sea level. The speed limit for trains in the tunnel is 100 mph (160 km/h). A second English Channel tunnel with a road was proposed in 2000 by Eurotunnel, as required by its contract for the original tunnel. The project would have involved the construction of the longest road tunnel in the world, containing two 29 miles (46 km) long carriageways, one on top of the other, which would have allowed motorists to complete the journey in about 30 minutes.

=== Channel bridge ===
- An English Channel road bridge was proposed in 2018 by Boris Johnson, who was then foreign secretary. It received limited support.

== Proposed fixed sea links between the Channel Islands and France ==
=== Channel Islands Tunnel ===
- The Channel Islands Tunnel was a proposed tunnel between Jersey and Lower Normandy. In July 2009, it was revealed by then States Assistant Minister for Planning and Environment, Deputy Rob Duhamel, that the States of Jersey were considering the feasibility of building a 14-mile (23 km) long tunnel to connect the island with Lower Normandy in France; the tunnel would be a concrete tube sunk in the seabed and then covered over. Talks between Jersey politicians and their French counterparts would be held in September 2009 to ascertain whether it would be of mutual benefit. The proposition included a road and rail link. The plans were not developed, and the then-Assistant Minister for Planning and Environment Deputy Rob Duhamel who had suggested the idea lost his seat in the 2014 elections.
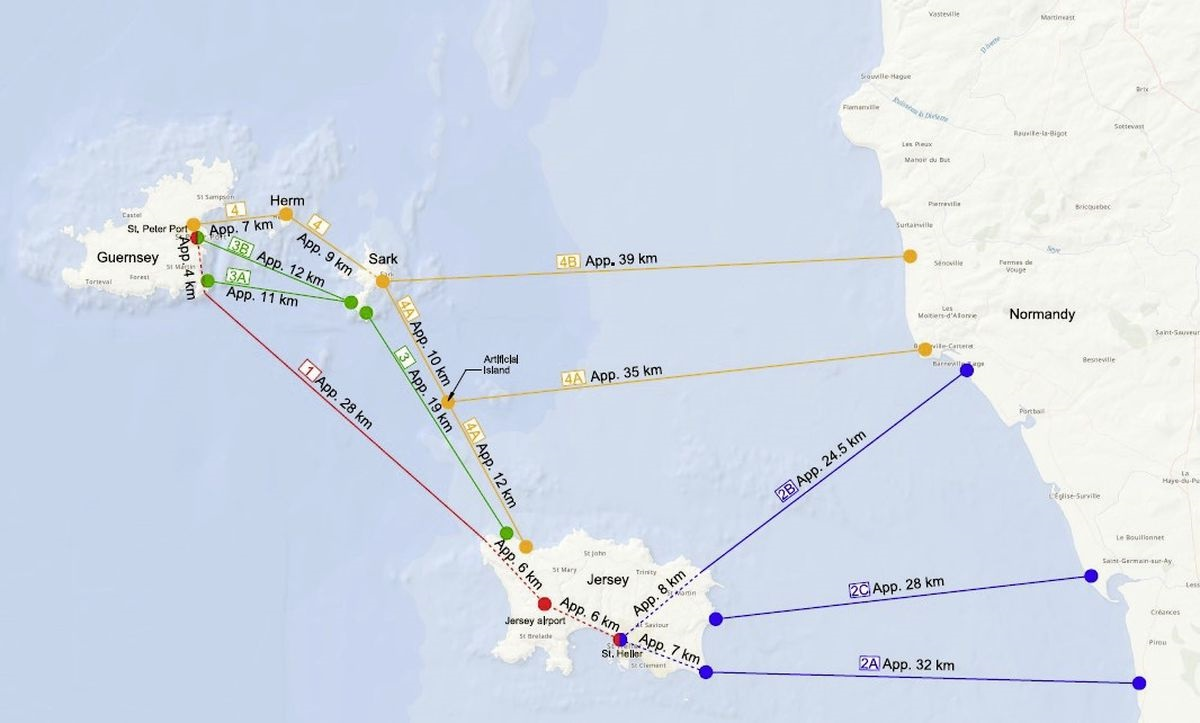
- 13 tunnel concepts between the four Main Channel Islands and/or Manche in France which includes the Cherbourg Peninsula
  The current Connect 3 Million (C3M) tunnel is a proposed tunnel between Guernsey, Jersey and Lower Normandy with the intention of developing a commuting population between Coutances in Lower Normandy and the Channel Islands. The C3M tunnel was proposed by the outgoing president of the Guernsey Chamber of Commerce, Martyn Dorey in 2018 Support was obtained from the Chief Ministers of both islands in July 2019 to explore a pre feasibility study with Ramboll. The initial study concluded that the project looked like it may be feasible, both technically and financially, and several route options were explored by Stephen Whitham from Ramboll, which included a shared airport between the islands on reclaimed land. The proposed Phase I route was a single bore rail tunnel direct from St Peter Port underground to Jerbourg Point then heading undersea to below Grosnez Castle, rising to a station at Jersey Airport and then back underground to St Helier. The study explored the achievability of a journey time of a little over 15 minutes using Bombardier Talent 3 rolling stock. In January 2020, the Guernsey Jersey link was reported by the local media to cost 2.6bln. Transit speed and convenience was cited as a major factor to stimulate greater social cohesion between the islands and the financial viability of the project. Low interest rates and the completion of proportionately similar (by GDP/per capita) projects in the Faroe Islands between Streymoy and Eysturoy in December 2020 have led to renewed calls to develop the idea to a full feasibility study in 2021.

== Other proposed fixed sea links within the British Isles ==
=== Isle of Man ===
- In 2018 Alan Dunlop, of the University of Liverpool, suggested a c. 18-mile (29 km) bridge be built from Scotland to the Isle of Man. This was in addition to his suggestion for a bridge connecting Northern Ireland to Scotland. He suggested that it would help open up the Manx economy.
- In 2008 the Liverpool Echo ran an article suggesting the construction of a 75-mile (121 km) bridge to the Isle of Man from Liverpool. Despite the proposal being nothing more than an April Fools joke, the bridge was included in an engineering text book called the "Handbook of International Bridge Engineering" in its 2017 edition.

=== Shetland and Orkney ===
- A possible Orkney tunnel between Orkney and the Scottish mainland (about 9 to 10 miles (14 to 16 km)) was publicly discussed especially around 2005, but also at other times.
- In 2014 a consultation was undertaken by Orkney Islands Council, with a view to considering a series of fixed links involving seven of the Orkney islands. This would include a bridge between the isles of Eday, Westray and Papa Westray, to alleviate the need for air travel—currently the shortest scheduled flight in the world, and also from Orkney to Shapinsay, Egilsay, Rousay and Wyre, but not a tunnel to Scotland this time.
- In 2019 a Shetland Island councilor warned that the island of Whalsay would suffer a "slow and painful death" if talks were not held on building a tunnel or fixed link to replace the ferry service.
- Bridges connecting Orkney to Shetland via Fair Isle have been mooted at numerous times throughout history with varying degrees of seriousness.
- In June 2026, Shetland council backed plans to build tunnels from Shetland's mainland to Yell and from Yell to Unst, to be followed by additional tunnels to Whalsay and Bressay. According to a feasibility study, these tunnels could be operational within 8 years at an estimated cost of £1.5bn, and in the long term would be cheaper than building new ferries and replacing harbours.

=== Hebrides ===
- In 2018 the Western Isles Council began plans to build a series of bridges and tunnels between the Outer Hebrides. The plans proposed bridges between the Sound of Harris and the Sound of Barra as a starting point. Ian Fordham, chairman of Outer Hebrides Tourism, suggested that the scheme would alleviate the pressure on the ferries that operate across the Outer Hebrides. Plans for a 15-mile (24 km) tunnel between North Uist and Skye, thereby connecting the Outer Hebrides to the Mainland, had also been mooted. In June 2019 a delegation headed up by the Western Isles MP went to the Faroe Islands to assess its tunnel and bridge-link system to see how the infrastructure could be translated to the Hebrides. In 2019 Angus MacNeil MP, chair of the Commons International Trade Committee, voiced his support for the project, and also for a proposed bridge between the Sound of Kerrera off Oban and between Mull and the mainland to ensure the Inner Hebrides were also connected.

=== Isle of Wight ===
- A bridge from mainland England to the Isle of Wight has been proposed a number of times, often due to the high cost of ferries to and from the island. The Isle of Wight Party—a political party active only in the Isle of Wight—was set up with the intention of campaigning for a fixed crossing. Critics have suggested that such a link may damage the ecology of the Isle of Wight, particularly the red squirrel population. Campaign group Pro-Link has put forward a number of plans to the Isle of Wight Infrastructure Task Force of the Isle of Wight council, including a £1.2 billion 4-mile (6.4 km) dual-carriageway tunnel between Whippingham on the isle and Gosport. The campaign group has proposed the project be initially run on a toll basis, but that it would have paid for itself after eighteen years. In 2017 Abel Connections Ltd released their plans for the project, "to create a new north-south axis through the centre of the Solent region by constructing a tunnel from the M27 east of junction 9 to the Whippingham roundabout on the Isle of Wight, with an additional access intersection 'cut and cover' portal near the mainland coast between Browndown and Meon."

=== Isles of Scilly ===
- Although bridges connecting some of the individual islands of the Isles of Scilly have been suggested at various points through history, the Cornwall Live newspaper ran a 2018 April Fools Day joke page suggesting that there was a secret plan to connect the Isles of Scilly to the mainland.

== See also ==
- Cross-sea traffic ways

Existing British Isles Fixed Sea Links

- Channel Tunnel
- Britannia Bridge
- Kingsferry Bridge
- Jubilee Bridge
- Skye Bridge
- Michaelson Road Bridge
- Langstone Bridge
- Menai Suspension Bridge
- Carrick-a-Rede Rope Bridge
- Lindisfarne Causeway
- The Strood Causeway
- Ferry Bridge

Proposed Infrastructure and Megaprojects within the British Isles and associated areas

- Severn Barrage
- Mersey Barrage
- Morecambe Bay § Bridge and tidal barrage proposal
- River Ribble § Estuary crossing proposals
- Strait of Gibraltar crossing
- Northern Powerhouse Rail
