= Beaufort's Dyke =

Oceanic trench between Northern Ireland and Scotland

Coordinates: 54.785°N 5.420°W

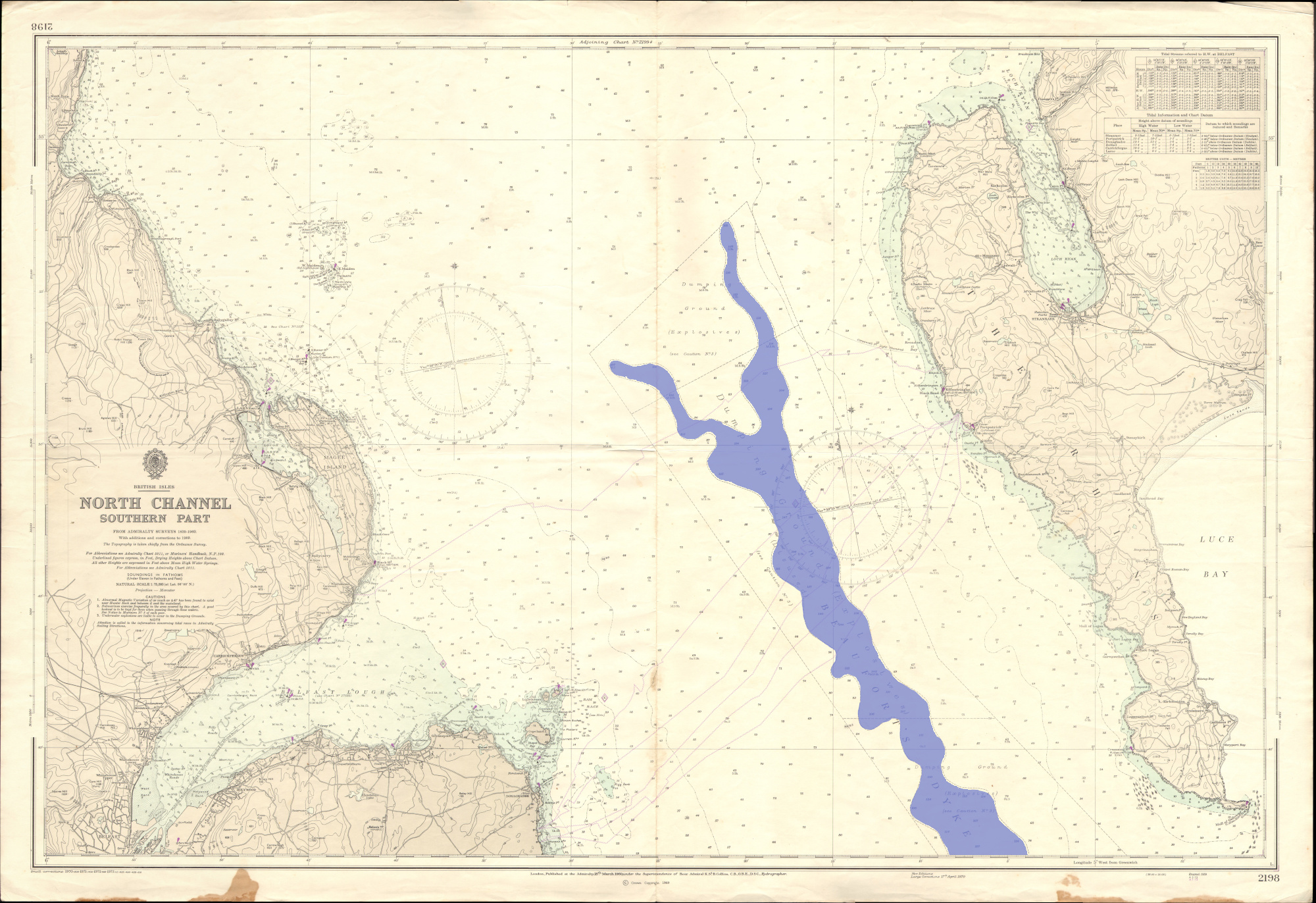
Beaufort's Dyke, highlighted in blue, on a 1969 Admiralty chart

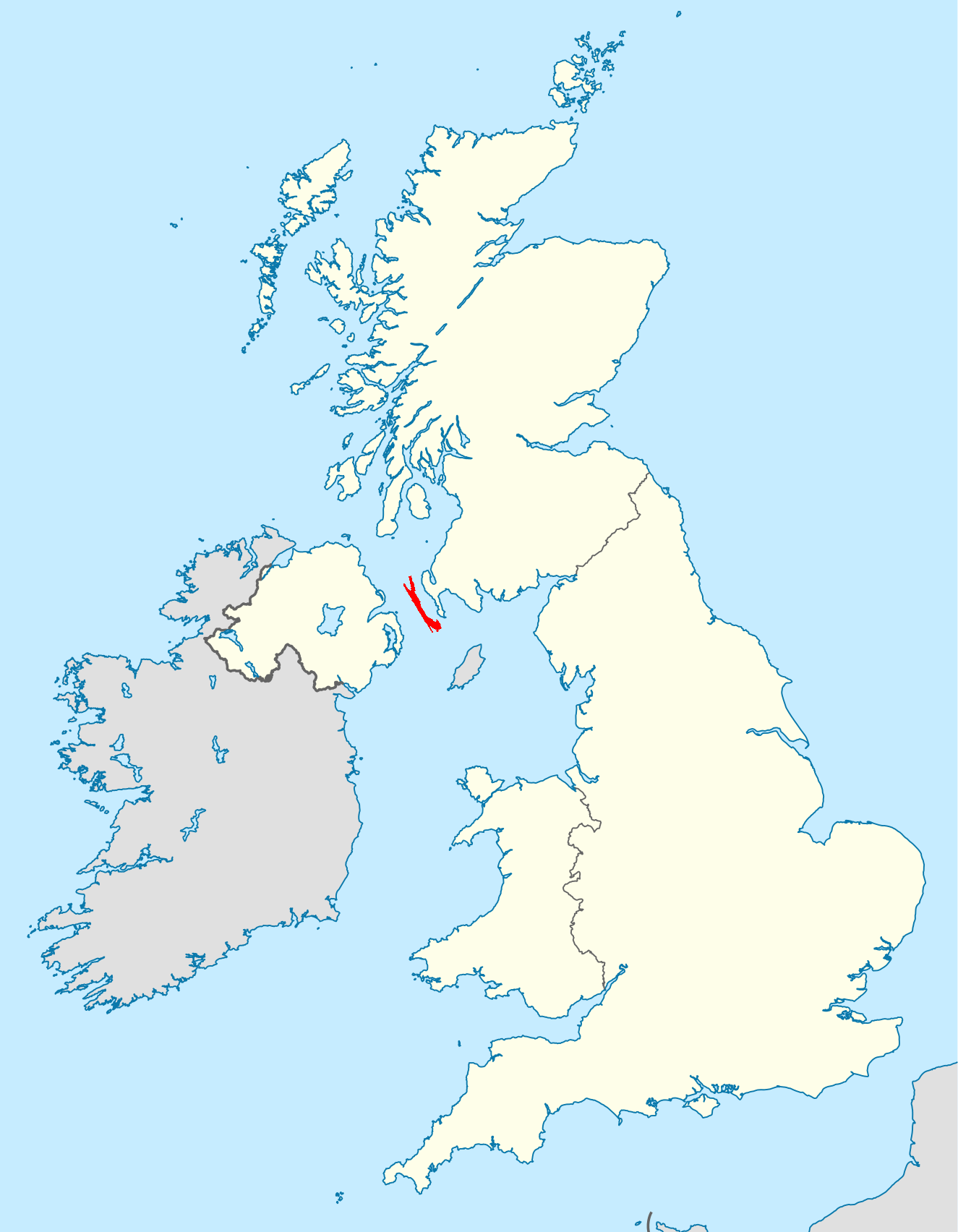
Map showing the size and location of Beaufort's Dyke, in red, between the coasts of Northern Ireland and Scotland

Beaufort's Dyke is a natural glacial-formed trench within the North Channel between Northern Ireland and Scotland. The dyke is 50 kilometres (25 nautical miles) long, 3.5 kilometres (2 nautical miles) wide and 200–312 m (700–1,000 ft) deep. The Dyke is one of the deepest areas of the European continental shelf. It is also known for being a munitions dump, with the first major dumping occurring after World War One.

The trench is recorded in 1856 as having been discovered "some years ago" by Frederick William Beechey.

== Geomorphology ==
Beaufort's Dyke is a submerged tunnel valley caused by glacial erosion during the last glacial period, and has been prevented from filling with sediment by strong tidal currents.

== Dumped munitions ==
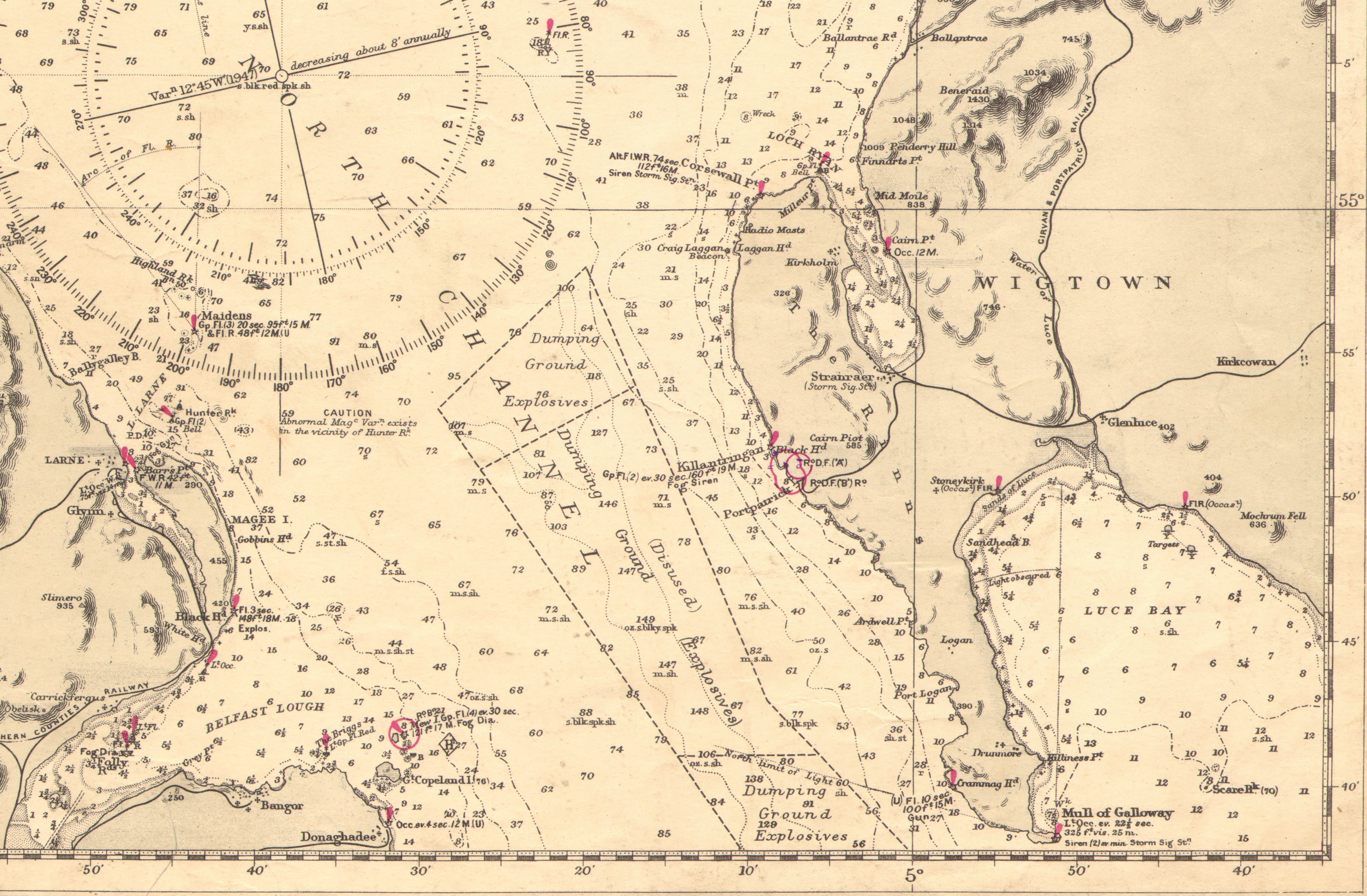
Beaufort's Dyke, showing the position of the munitions dump, from an Admiralty chart published in 1947. Depth in fathoms

Because of its depth and its proximity to the Cairnryan military port, Beaufort's Dyke became the United Kingdom's largest offshore dump site for surplus conventional and chemical munitions after the Second World War: it had been used for the purpose since the early 20th century. The Ministry of Defence has estimated that well over a million tons of munitions have been dumped there, including 14,500 tons of 5 inch (127 mm) artillery rockets filled with phosgene dumped in July 1945.

Munitions have since been deposited by the tide on nearby beaches. In 1995, phosphorus bombs washed up on Scottish coasts, coinciding with the laying of the Scotland-Northern Ireland pipeline (SNIP), a 24-inch (610-millimetre) gas interconnector constructed by British Gas. Over the previous five years, anti-tank grenades had washed up on the shores of Northern Ireland and the Isle of Man.

An explosion was registered as a 2.5 Magnitude earthquake on 8 February 1986.

== Nuclear waste ==
According to documents from the Public Record Office, approximately two tonnes of concrete-encased metal drums filled with radioactive laboratory rubbish and luminous paint were dumped in the dyke during the 1950s.

== Crossings ==
Projects for a tunnel or Irish Sea fixed crossing between Northern Ireland and Scotland have been suggested at various times from the late 19th century onwards. The dyke has always been an important problem for such proposals, in terms of both practicality and cost.

In February 2020, the UK government announced an initial investigation into a Scotland–Northern Ireland bridge. Two possible routes were proposed: Portpatrick–Larne and Kintyre peninsula–Torr Head. The Portpatrick route would cross the dyke. Explosive ordnance advisers Exord cast doubt on the Portpatrick route saying "any intrusive works such as piling associated with the construction of bridges would pose an unacceptable level of risk". The study concluded that Beaufort's Dyke was one of the project's principal challenges, requiring bridge spans "approaching 4km on foundations set back from the edge", even if crossing the Dyke at its narrowest point. The bridge project was estimated at £335 bn, and it was rejected by a feasibility study.
