= Greengauge 21 =

- Founded: 2006
- Purpose: High-speed rail
- Location: London, England,
- Region served: UK
- Method: lobbying, research, innovation
- Key people: Jim Steer, Julie Mills,
- Website: www.greengauge21.net

Greengauge 21 is a non-for-profit registered company that aims to investigate and develop the concepts associated with a UK high-speed rail network.

== Research ==
Previous research into high-speed rail (HSR) has tended to focus on the international spatial level. Greengauge is one of a number of groups now using a multilevel (regional, national and international) analysis to satisfactorily understand HSR's territorial implications. Greengauge 21 has shown that while capacity on the new line (HS2) is expected to be fully used soon enough (certainly within 20 years of opening), there is plenty of scope and a good business case for a second north–south high-speed line.

In February 2010, Greengauge 21 contracted KPMG, one of the big four auditing firms, to conduct a study into the economic benefits of a high-speed rail network. The findings of this research were published in the report "Consequences for employment and economic growth".

Greengauge 21 research has found that the price of travel on a future domestic high-speed network will be comparable with fares on conventional trains. A new report says that many passengers could be paying no more than £20 and dismisses claims that high-speed rail will be the preserve of a wealthy elite.

Many of Greengauge 21's recommendations have been incorporated into the planning of High Speed 2, a high-speed rail line, which will link London to Birmingham, with possible future phases extending the line to the North of England and Scotland.

== Publications ==
- Capturing the benefits of HS2 on existing lines
- HS2 - Why the critics are wrong
- High-Speed Rail: Fair and Affordable
- Fast Forward: A High-Speed Rail Strategy for Britain
- The Next Steps for High Speed Rail in Britain

== See also ==
- High Speed 2
- High Speed 1
- High-speed rail in the United Kingdom
- Channel Tunnel
- Department for Transport
