= High-speed rail in the United Kingdom =

Operational high-speed lines in the UK: 140–186 mph (225–300 km/h) 125 mph (200 km/h) <110 mph (180 km/h)

High-speed rail in the United Kingdom is provided on five upgraded railway lines running at top speeds of 125 mph (200 km/h) and one purpose-built high-speed line reaching 186 mph (300 km/h).

Trains currently travel at 125 mph (200 km/h) on the East Coast Main Line, Great Western Main Line, Midland Main Line, parts of the Cross Country Route, and the West Coast Main Line. The 67 miles (108 km) long High Speed 1 (HS1) line connects London to the Channel Tunnel, with international Eurostar services running from London St Pancras International to cities in France, Belgium, and the Netherlands at 186 mph (300 km/h). The line is also used by high-speed commuter services from Kent to the capital, operating at top speeds of 140 mph (225 km/h).

Beginning in 2019, construction on a major new purpose-built high-speed rail line, High Speed 2 (HS2) is ongoing. When completed, High Speed 2 will link London with the West Midlands, saving approximately 36 minutes on the route to Birmingham. Government-backed plans to provide east–west high-speed services between cities in the North of England are also in development, as part of the Northern Powerhouse Rail project.

In addition to these plans, the East Coast Main Line is currently in the process of an upgrade to cab signalling, which will allow trains to run at 140 mph (225 km/h) on some parts of the east coast line, and the Transpennine Route Upgrade aims to increase the speed of the Leeds-Manchester railway to 125 mph (200 km/h).

Trains in the United Kingdom are operated by a mixture of public (as operator of last resort) and private railway companies as part of the ongoing re-nationalisation of British rail transport infrastructure. High-speed services are provided by Avanti West Coast, CrossCountry, East Midlands Railway, Eurostar, Grand Central, Great Western Railway, Hull Trains, London North Eastern Railway, Lumo, Southeastern and TransPennine Express.

== History ==
=== High-speed steam ===
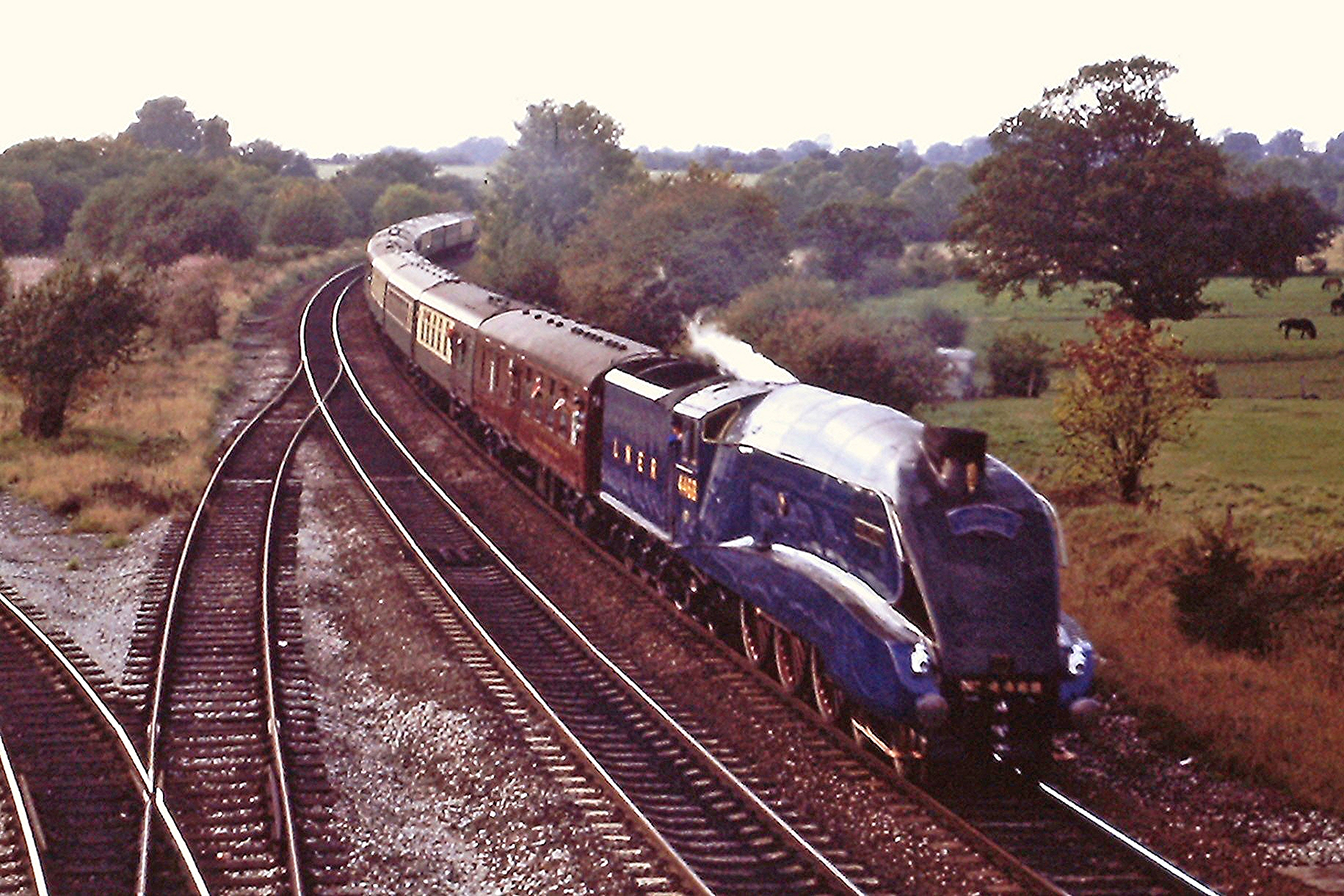
Mallard, the record-holding steam locomotive, with a recorded top speed of 126 mph (203 km/h)

During the age of steam locomotion, the British railway industry strove to develop reliable technology for powering high-speed rail services between major cities.

The earliest attempt to build a railway line dedicated for operation at the higher speeds was the Great Central Main Line, opened by the Great Central Railway (GCR) in 1899. This line was an ambitious project led by railway entrepreneur Sir Edward Watkin who envisaged a Liverpool-Paris route crossing from Britain to France via a proposed channel tunnel. Although the tunnel scheme was not realised by this railway company, the route operated services between Sheffield Victoria and London Marylebone via Leicester Central, with the dedicated express track beginning at Annesley in Nottinghamshire.

The line was built to certain specifications so that it could take advantage of the higher speeds offered by the advances in steam locomotion. For most of the line the ruling gradient did not exceed 1 in 176 (5.7 ‰); outside urban areas wide curves were employed with a minimum radius of 1 mile; the route only had one level crossing; and, unlike other railway lines in Britain, the Great Central Main Line was built to an expanded continental loading gauge which meant it could accommodate larger-sized continental trains. The GCR's target market was higher-class 'business' travellers, and it promoted its long-distance express trains with the slogan "Rapid Travel in Luxury". Most of the Great Central Main Line closed in 1966 as part of the Beeching cuts, although parts of the route are still in use today by Chiltern Railways as the London to Aylesbury Line. According to plans announced in 2010, part of the proposed High Speed 2 (HS2) route will run along a re-opened 10-mile (16 km) section of the GCR route between Calvert and Brackley. An alternative proposal to re-open the GCR for freight has been put forward by the Central Railway company.

Various claims exist for the first locomotive to break the 100 mph (161 km/h) barrier, notably the Great Western Railway's City of Truro (1904) and the LNER's Flying Scotsman (1934). Locomotive power capable of reaching 126 mph (203 km/h) has existed in Britain since 1938, when the LNER's Mallard broke the steam locomotive speed record. Despite advances in locomotive engineering, the railway infrastructure was unable to support safe running at such high speeds and, until the mid-1970s, the British railway speed limit remained at 100 mph (161 km/h).

=== The APT ===
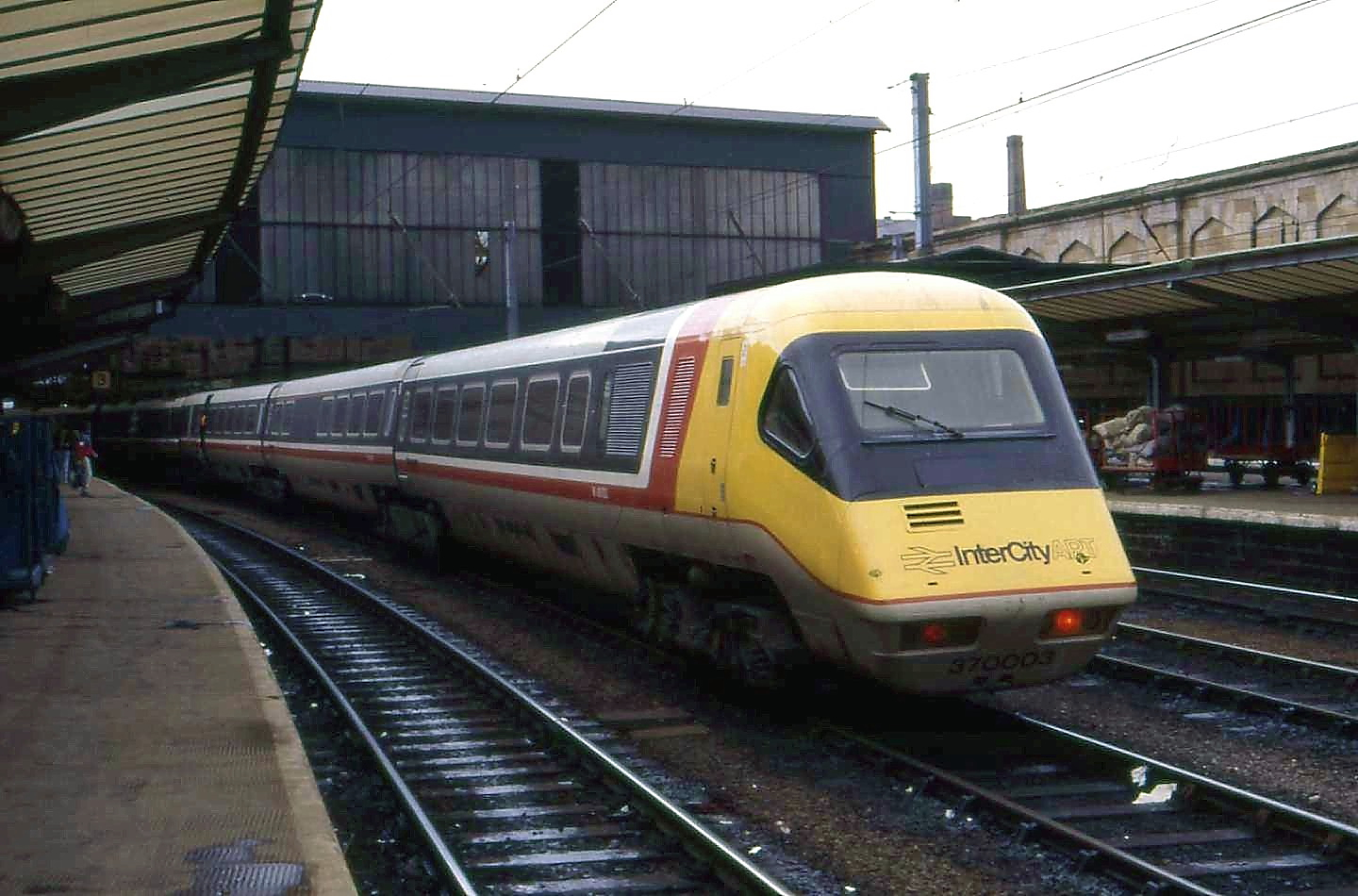
APT-P (Class 370), at Carlisle, 1983

In the 1963, the British Rail board voted to established the British Rail Research Division, to explore new technologies for high-speed freight and passenger rail services on existing rail infrastructure, leading to the initiation of the Advanced Passenger Train (APT) programme, with a planned top speed of 155 mph (249 km/h). An experimental version, the APT-E was tested between 1972 and 1976. It was equipped with the C-APT in Cab signalling system, and a tilting mechanism which allowed the train to tilt into bends to reduce cornering forces on passengers, and was powered by gas turbines (the first to be used on British Rail since the Great Western Railway, and subsequent Western Region utilised Swiss built Brown-Boveri, and British built Metropolitan Vickers locomotives (18000 and 18100) in the early 1950s). The 1970s oil crisis prompted a rethink in the choice of motive power (as with the prototype TGV in France), and British Rail later opted for traditional electric overhead lines when the pre-production and production APTs were brought into service in 1980–86.

Initial experience with the Advanced Passenger Trains was good. They had a high power-to-weight ratio to enable rapid acceleration; the prototype set record speeds on the Great Western Main Line and the Midland Main Line, and the production versions vastly reduced journey times on the WCML. The APT was, however, beset with technical problems; financial constraints and negative media coverage eventually caused the project to be cancelled.

=== InterCity 125 ===
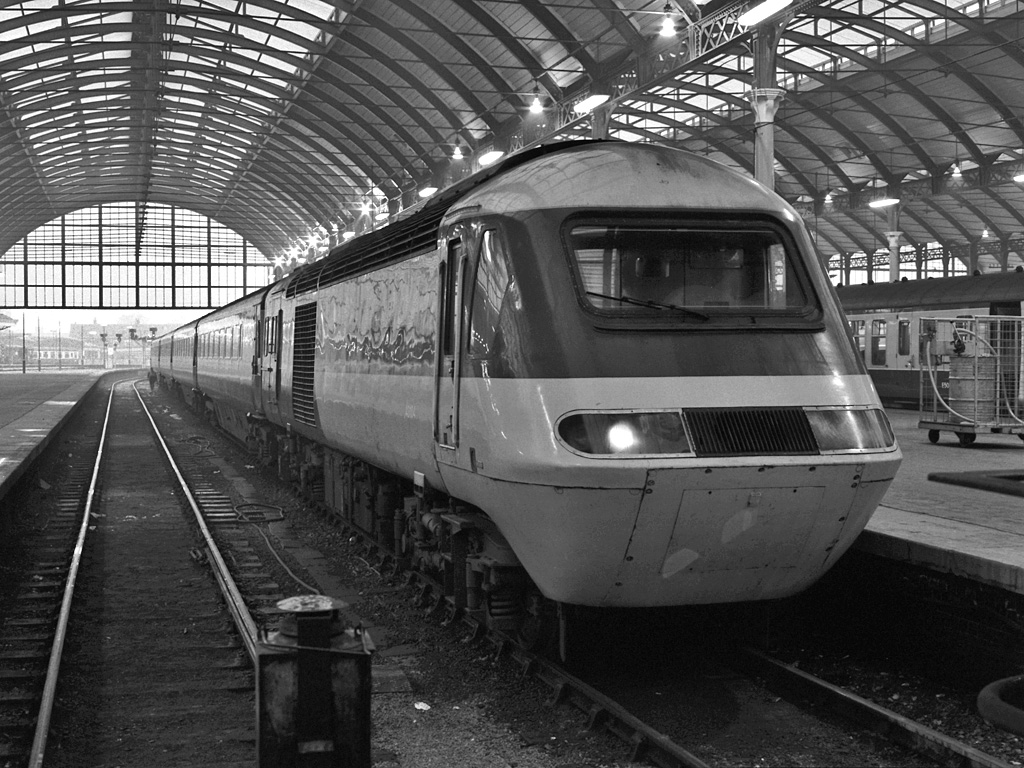
An InterCity 125 train at Hull Paragon station in 1982. The InterCity 125 is the world's fastest diesel train.

During the same period, British Rail also invested in a separate, parallel project to design a train based on conventional technology as a stopgap. The InterCity 125, otherwise known as the High-Speed Train (HST), was launched in 1976 with a service speed of 125 mph (201 km/h) and provided the first high-speed rail services in Britain. The HST was diesel-powered, and the Great Western Main Line (GWML) was the first to be modified for the new service. Because the GWML had been built mostly straight, often with four tracks and with a distance of 1 mi (1.6 km) between distant signal and main signal, it allowed trains to run at 125 mph (201 km/h) with relatively moderate infrastructure investments, compared to other countries in Europe. The Intercity 125 had proven the economic case for high-speed rail, and British Rail was keen to explore further advances.

=== InterCity 225 ===
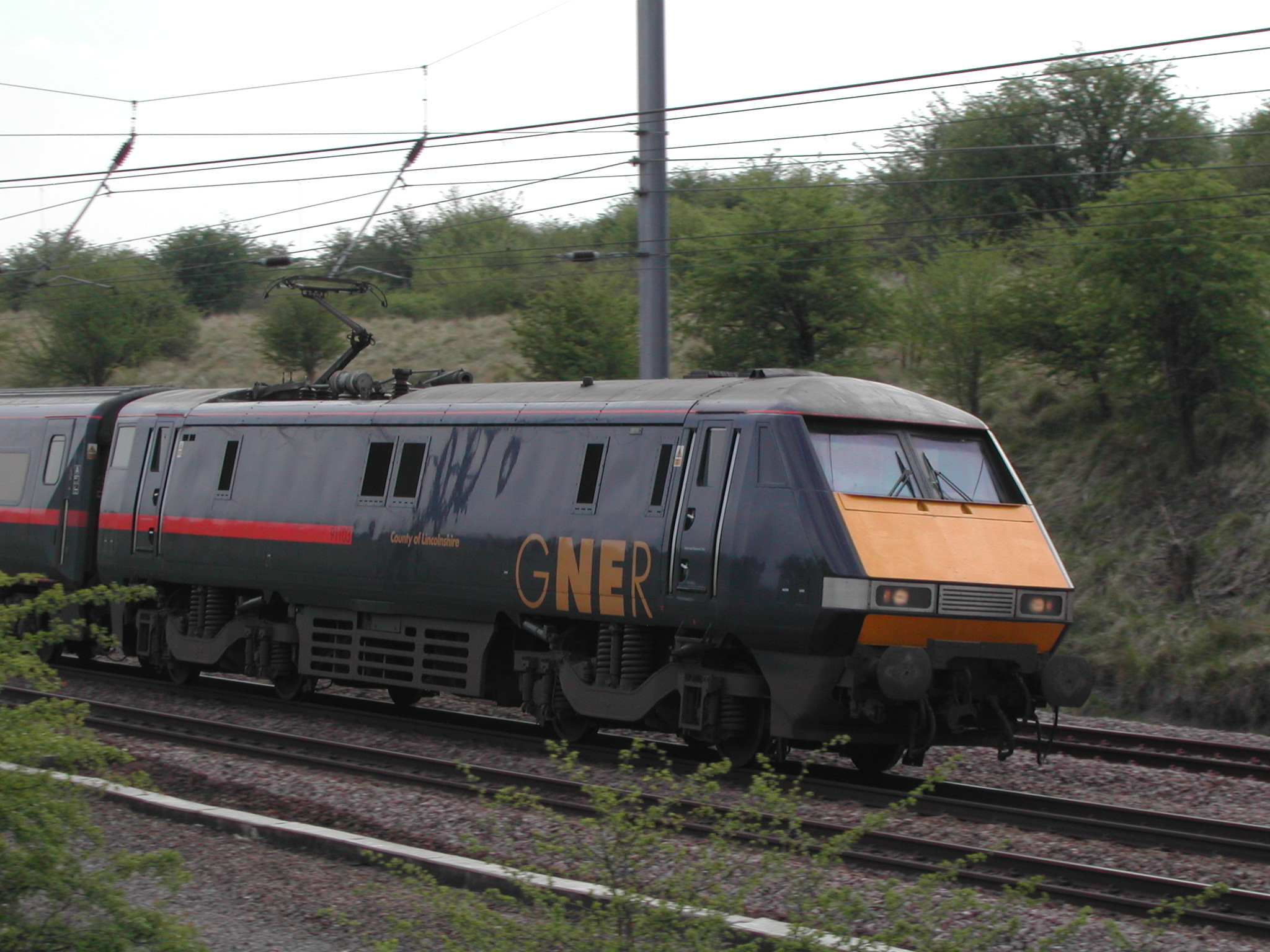
GNER liveried InterCity 225

BR then proceeded to electrify the ECML and ordered a new fleet of InterCity 225 electric trains in the mid-1980s. These were capable of 140 mph (225 km/h) and although not initially equipped to tilt, were designed to be easily upgraded to tilt mode by having trailer profiles that tapered inwards at the top and suitable bogies. Speeds of 140 mph (225 km/h) were tested on the southern, straighter sections of the ECML by using a flashing green aspect on the signals. This indicated it was safe to proceed above 125 mph (201 km/h), but HMRSI eventually ruled that this was dangerous and that speeds above 125 mph (201 km/h) would require in-cab signalling. The 225s were therefore limited to 125 mph (201 km/h) and have been ever since.

=== High-speed DMUs ===
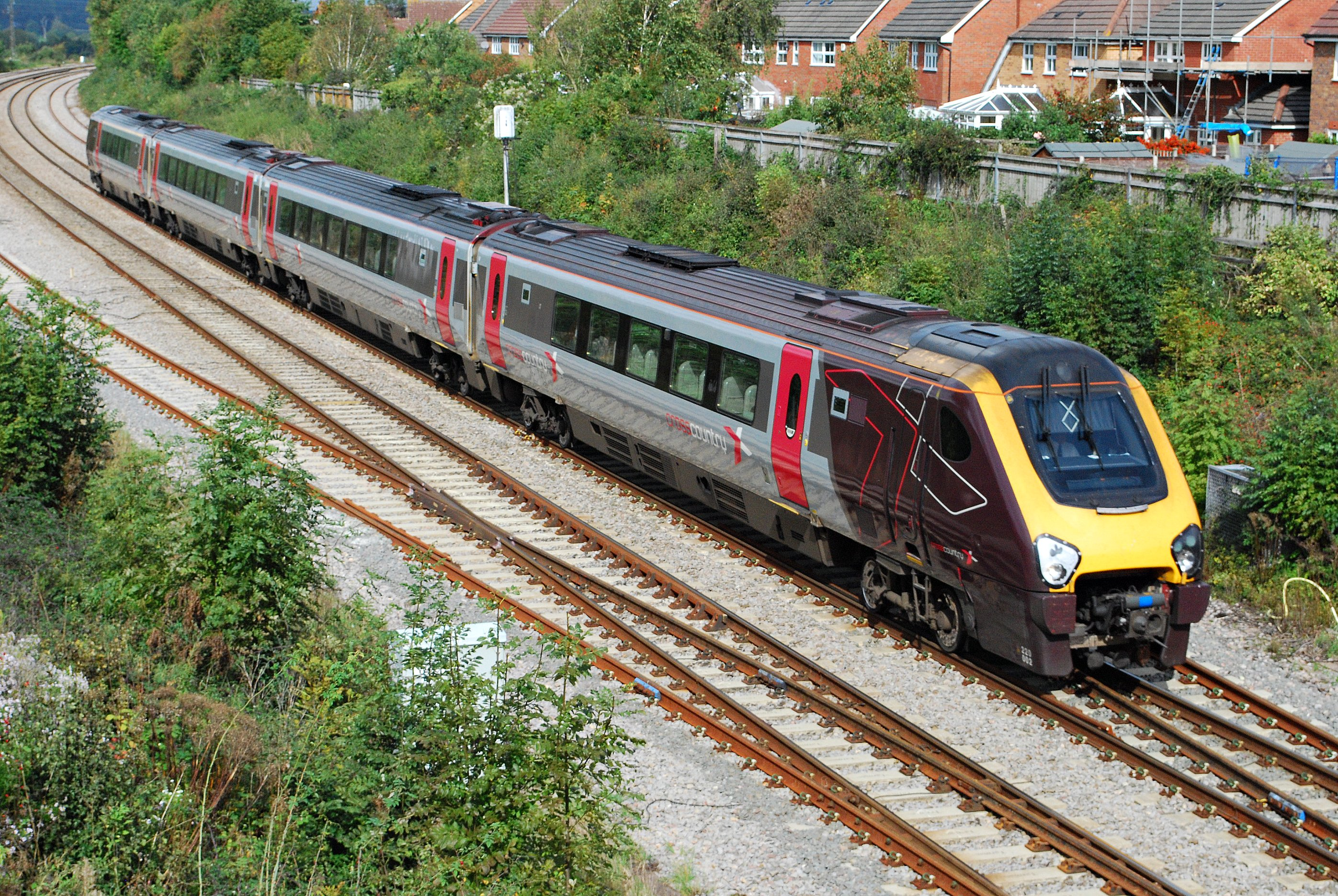
A CrossCountry Class 220 Voyager

In the early 2000s, a number of train operating companies introduced diesel multiple units (DMUs) capable of 125 mph (201 km/h) speeds, including the Adelante, Voyager, Super-Voyager and Meridian/Pioneer units.

=== Pendolino ===
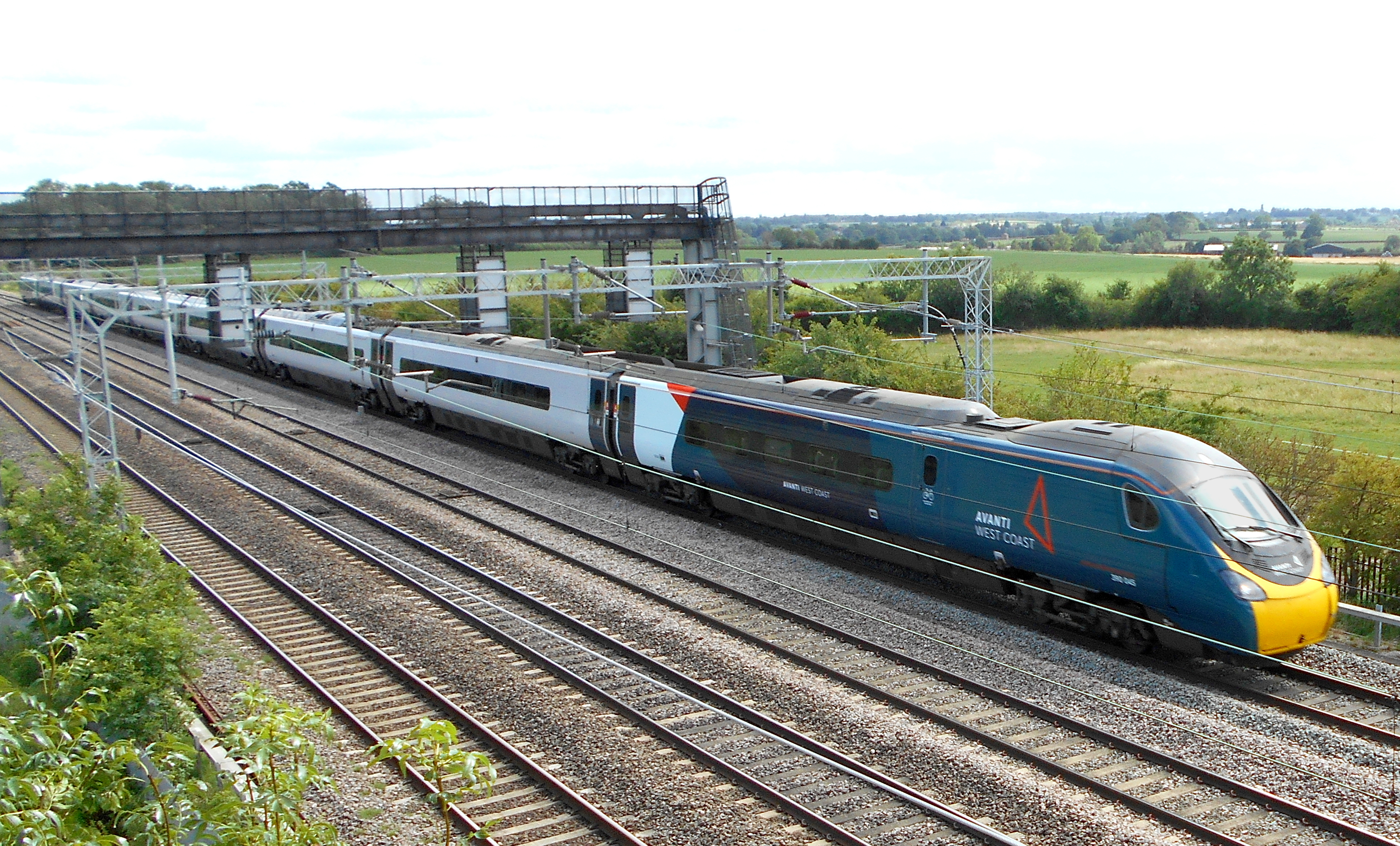
A Class 390 Pendolino. The Class 390 was designed for 140 mph (225 km/h).

In 2002, Virgin Trains introduced a new high-speed service on the West Coast Main Line with a fleet of 53 custom-designed Pendolino trains. The nine-car trains were constructed by Alstom and are equipped with a tilting mechanism developed by Fiat to enable them to run at high speeds on existing rail infrastructure, thus fulfilling the aims of the APT project some 30 years later.

The Pendolinos were designed to run at 140 mph (225 km/h), but require in-cab signalling for high-speed operation. The 2004 West Coast Main Line modernisation programme was an upgrade to the infrastructure to allow faster line speeds, As with the introduction of the InterCity 225 in the 1980s, the lack of signalling upgrades resulted in the maximum line speed being restricted to 125 mph (201 km/h). Some members of the fleet were later lengthened to 11 carriages.

== High Speed 1 (HS1) ==
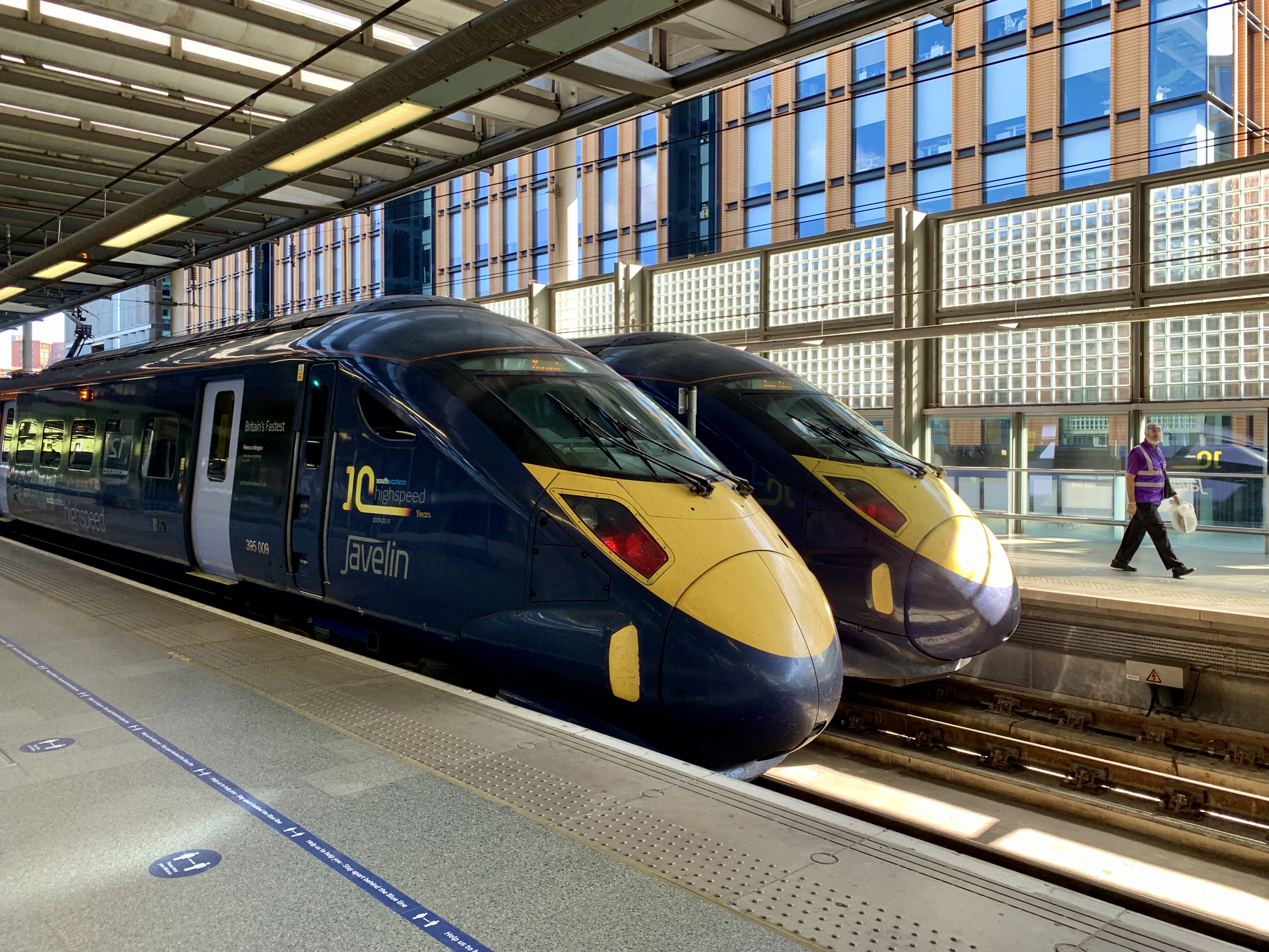
Southeastern high-speed trains at St Pancras International

High Speed 1 (HS1) (formally the Channel Tunnel Rail Link (CTRL)) was the first new mainline railway to be built in the UK for a century and was constructed by London and Continental Railways. After a lengthy process of route selection and public enquiries in the second half of the 1990s, work got under way on Section 1 from the Channel Tunnel to west of the Medway in 1998 and the line opened in 2003. Section 2, continuing the line to London St Pancras, started soon after Section 1 and was opened to the public on 14 November 2007.

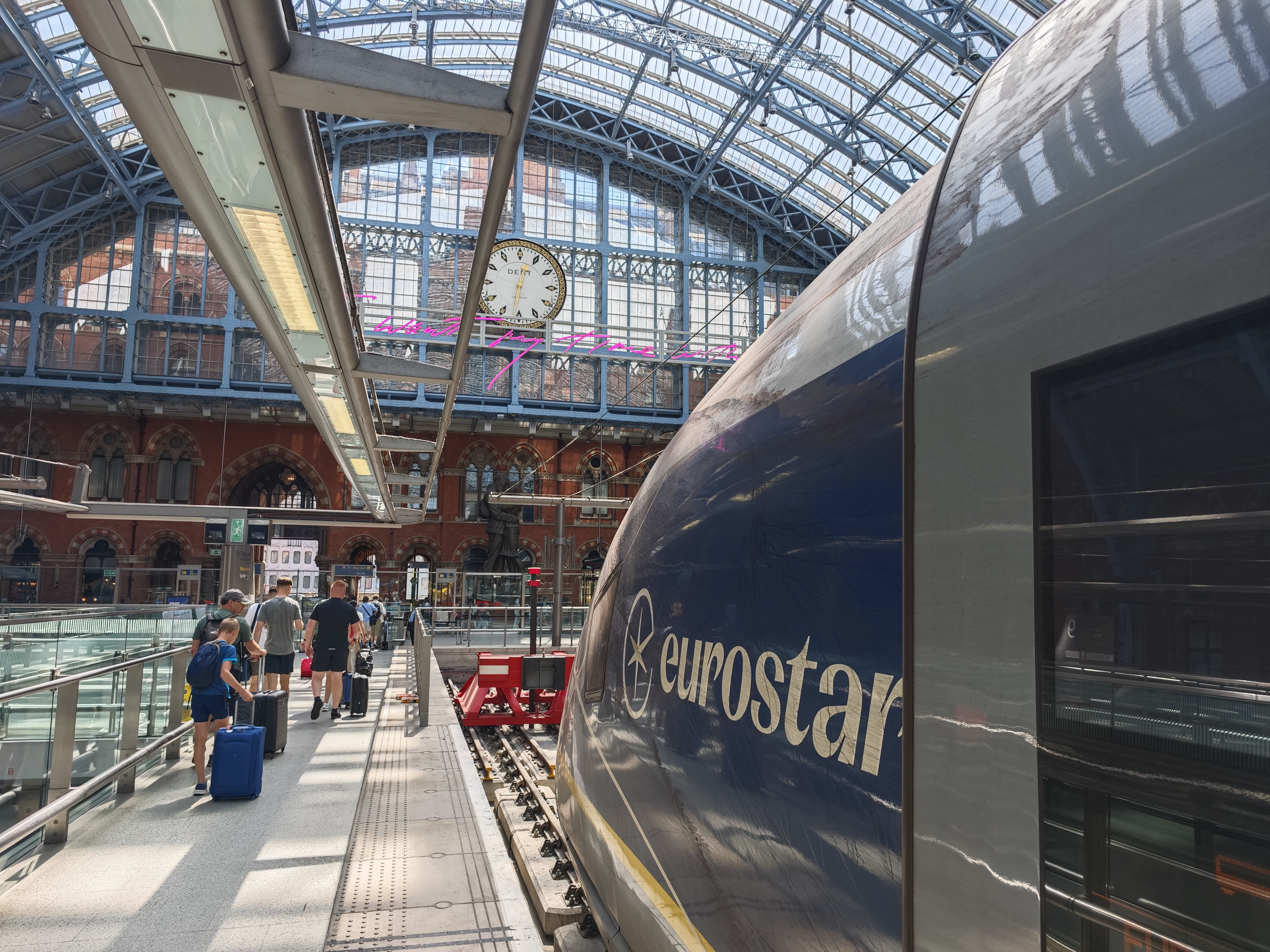
A Eurostar train arriving at St Pancras International railway station in London

The HS1 line was finished on time and under budget. The reduction in journey times and increase in reliability achieved through the opening of Section 1 enabled Eurostar to capture 71% of the total London–Paris market and over 80% of the leisure market and Section 2 has increased these figures further. Additionally, the connections provided to the WCML, MML and ECML by Section 2 may see growth of hitherto marginal markets, by finally allowing Regional Eurostars to operate, at least on the electrified ECML and WCML.

The completion and successful operation of HS1 Sections 1 and 2 spurred much discussion and several proposals for new lines in the UK and many interested parties are hoping to capitalise on the momentum given to these ideas by the completion of the complete HS1. These proposals are discussed below.

The construction of HS1 also permitted the introduction of a new domestic high-speed service when in 2009 Southeastern launched its high-speed route between London St Pancras and Ashford International. Operated with a fleet of Class 395 trains, the service reaches a top speed of 140 mph (225 km/h). Southeastern High-Speed is currently the only British domestic high-speed service allowed to run above 125 mph (201 km/h).

== High Speed 2 (HS2) ==
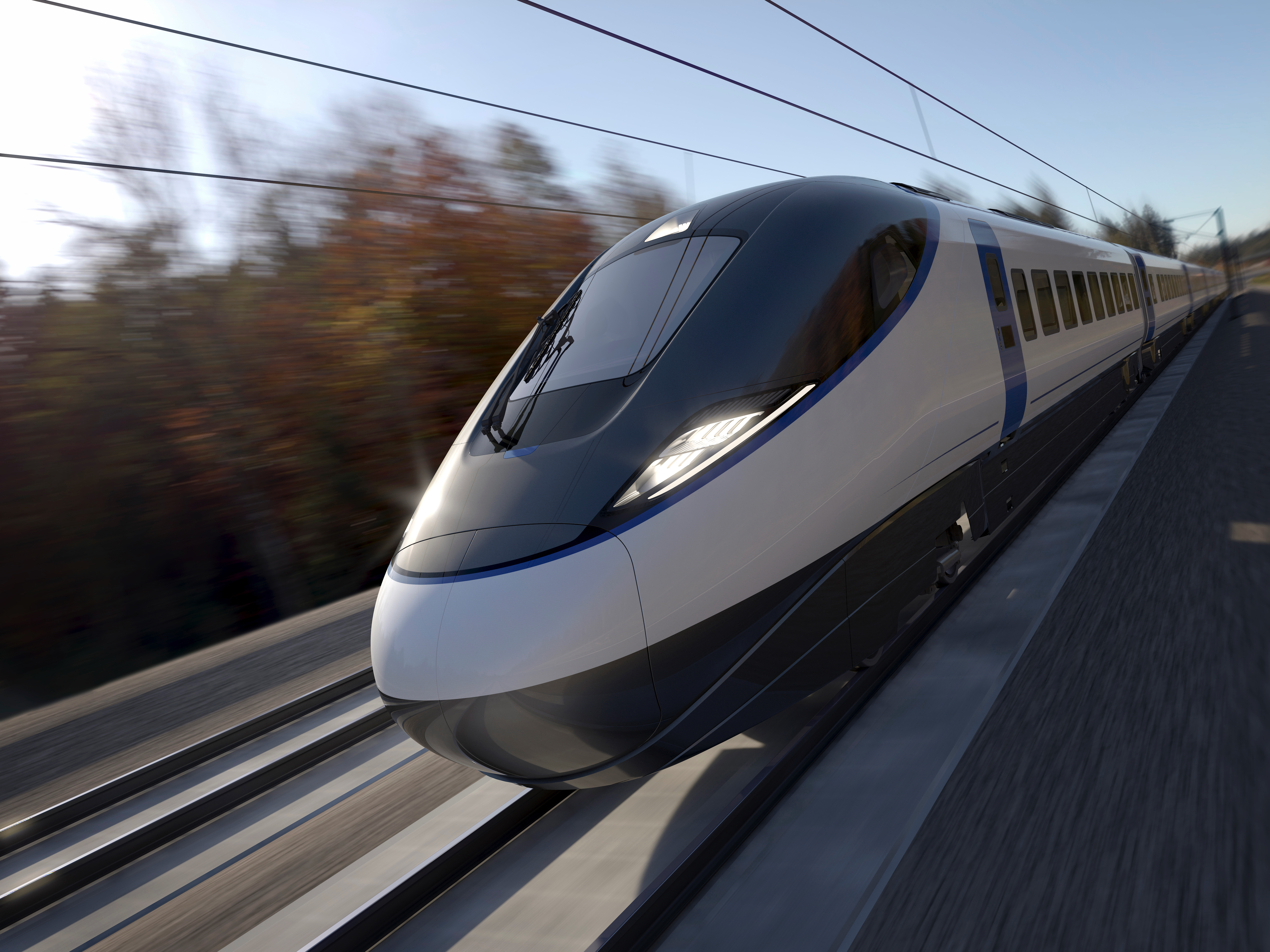
Artist impression of HS2 train

High Speed 2 (HS2) is a high-speed railway originally designed to serve London, Birmingham, Leeds and Manchester, Liverpool. The UK Government launched a formal high-speed rail project in January 2009, and high-speed rail has the support of all three main political parties. Subject to consultation, the London terminus for the high-speed line would be Euston, a new Birmingham city-centre station would be built at Curzon Street, and there would be interchange stations with the Elizabeth line at Old Oak Common and with the existing intercity rail network near Birmingham Airport.

HS2's original proposal was for a Y-shaped network between London and England's major regional cities, serving Manchester, Birmingham, Leeds, East Midlands, with connections on to the West Coast and East Coast Main Lines to allow through services to Liverpool, York, Newcastle, Edinburgh and Glasgow. The Greengauge 21 study states that the total route length, including the connections to the existing network and High Speed One, would be 150 miles (240 km).

The first phase of High Speed 2 is currently under construction. However, the Integrated Rail Plan for the North and Midlands (IRP) was published on 18 November 2021 and impacted the High Speed 2 plan. Following several changes to the project, the route was successively truncated; in October 2023, it was announced that subsequent phases of the route would be cancelled, with the result that High Speed 2 would run between London and Birmingham only. The rest of the funding would go into the Network North programme, which consists of hundreds of transport projects mostly in Northern England and Midlands, including new high-speed lines linking up major cities and new railway hubs.

== UK high speed lines ==
Line	Operating speed (max)	Length	Purpose built or upgraded	Construction began	Construction completed or expected start of revenue services
High Speed 1	300 km/h (190 mph)	108 km (67 mi)	Purpose built	1998	2007
High Speed 2	Service: 330 km/h (205 mph); Maximum: 360 km/h (225 mph)	230 km (140 mi)	Purpose built	2017	Unknown
East Coast Main Line	200 km/h (125 mph)	632.7 km (393.1 mi)	Upgraded	1840s	1850
Great Western Main Line	200 km/h (125 mph)	190 km (120 mi)	Upgraded	1830s	1841
Midland Main Line	200 km/h (125 mph)	500 km (310 mi)	Upgraded	1830s	1839
Cross Country Route (Birmingham - Derby)	200 km/h (125 mph)	56 km (35 mi)	Upgraded	1836	1839
West Coast Main Line	200 km/h (125 mph)	642 km (399 mi)	Upgraded	1830s	1837

== Studies and proposals ==
In 2001, two privately sponsored proposals were put forward to build high-speed lines in the UK. The first, from Virgin Rail Group, was part of its tender for the InterCity East Coast franchise. The second, from FirstGroup, was independent of the Department for Transport / Strategic Rail Authority rail franchising process. Neither was welcomed by the government, which in the wake of the Hatfield rail crash was focused on – as it saw it – getting the rail network back to reliable operations.

=== Virgin Trains' ECML bid ===
When the InterCity East Coast franchise (then operated by GNER) came up for its first renewal, Virgin Rail Group raised the idea in 2000 of constructing new track and purchasing a new fleet of trains for the line. These so-called VGVs (Virgins à Grande Vitesse, after the French TGV) would have been capable of 330 km/h (210 mph) and would have used a mixture of new track and existing track. The new track would be from Peterborough to Yorkshire and on from Newcastle to the Scottish border. This first line would have opened in 2009 and was chosen for ease of construction in the south and elimination of severe curves in Northumberland. Later, if successful, further stretches would have been upgraded. Publicity material featuring Virgin branded TGV and ICE trains appeared, and it was stated that the stock would be built in Birmingham. Virgin's bid was rejected, and GNER's franchise was renewed.

=== FirstGroup's plans for the GWML corridor ===
Around the same time, First Great Western, operator of lines west of London, announced a study into a 320 km/h (200 mph) line from London to South West England and South Wales. First sponsored the study and input was given by other stakeholders in the regions to be served.

Journey times from London given included:

- Swindon 35 mins
- Bristol Parkway 49 mins
- Cardiff Central 70 mins
- Swansea 120 mins
- Plymouth 140 mins

Although First stated that this report would be published and given to the SRA and government, little has been heard of the plan since the initial press release. In 2010 Cardiff city council again lobbied central government for a high-speed rail line to London via Bristol, then estimated to contribute £2.2 billion to the Welsh economy. The Department for Transport responded to this bid by stating that "the Government's vision is of a truly national high-speed rail network for the whole of Britain. However, given financial constraints, we will have to achieve this in phases. Ministers are currently considering HS2 Ltd's proposals in respect of the potential first phase of such a network. We are aware of the proposals for a high speed line to Wales and these will feed into our thinking as we seek to develop a wider high speed rail network."

=== Government-commissioned studies ===
Since the completion of Section 1 of the HS1, government departments and ministers have commissioned reports into the viability of high-speed rail. This is in part due to the success of the HS1 project, part due to realisation that upgrades to existing infrastructure offer poor value for money and cannot hope to meet future capacity needs, and part due to increasing environmental concerns over the expansion of the short-haul airline industry.

==== Atkins study ====
In 2001, the SRA commissioned Atkins to perform a feasibility study into the transport and business case for high-speed rail. The study, published on 29 October 2004, looked at combinations of 11 routing options to accommodate forecast traffic flows and concluded:

- New capacity is required to relieve the WCML by 2015
- Further new capacity will be required to relieve all three north–south routes by 2031
- Construction of the complete proposed network would cost £33bn, the shortest option £10bn
- The line would give a cost-benefit ratio of between 1.9 and 2.8 to 1

Furthermore, additional work was done to look at the impact of road pricing, downgrading the enhancements to the ECML, and changes to the Treasury's green book method of assessing project finance. All three areas were found to improve the case for high-speed rail.

Atkins Option 1

The Atkins study proposed a line between London and Stoke-on-Trent, broadly following the existing WCML and using the WCML for onward connection, as its baseline scenario.

Atkins Option 8

The study concluded that new lines should be built each side of the Pennines, with the eastern line continuing to Edinburgh and Glasgow. A branch also serves Heathrow Airport. This is the £33bn "end game" scenario.

Atkins Option 10

The study considered a link between Manchester and Leeds but did not take this forward.

==== Commission for Integrated Transport ====
In 2004 the Commission for Integrated Transport commissioned Steer Davies Gleave to produce a report on high-speed rail. The report focused on the reasons why the costs being quoted for British HSR routes (particularly in Atkins) were high in comparison to other countries, in addition to investigating the business case and transport case for such a network.

The routes studied gave hypothetical journey times from and to London as follows:

Destination	Current Journey Time	Proposed HSR Journey Time
Birmingham	1h 10m	0h 55m
Manchester	2h 08m	1h 06m
Leeds	2h 05m	1h 25m
Liverpool	2h 08m	1h 15m
Newcastle	2h 50m	1h 40m
Edinburgh	4h 05m	2h 06m
Glasgow	4h 20m	2h 32m

The study gave the following recommendations:

- That the Government and SRA begin to plan now for High-Speed Rail (HSR) as part of a wider strategy to ease the anticipated capacity constraints on the existing networks. Schemes that appeared to offer good value for money should be actively progressed.
- That costs of HSR projects be closely examined to bring them closer to the lower costs achieved in Europe. They should take account of possible reductions in underlying costs and further cost reductions if the industry structure, safety regulations and the approvals process were reviewed.
- That the Government examine ways of maximising private sector involvement in HSR. This should take account of the potential impact of any future national road charging scheme on passenger demand and its potential to make private sector investment more attractive.
- That changes in the appraisal process be considered relating to value of time, economic impact analysis, environmental assessments and risk/optimism bias allowances.
- Additional capacity would be required by 2015.
- Ways to reduce the currently high cost of new rail infrastructure such as high-speed lines included:
  - Building lines in phases rather than all at once could produce a cost saving of 20–30%.
  - British project management, planning, design and legal costs can reach 25% of the total cost (compared with 3% on the Spanish Madrid–Lerida line) and could therefore be reduced.
- If these cost savings materialised, then the benefits could outweigh the costs by 3 to 1.

==== Eddington report ====
In 2006 British Airways' former chief executive Sir Rod Eddington produced a report on future transport strategy.

The report covered all transport modes and had initially been expected to strongly recommend investment in high-speed rail. However, on 29 August 2006 The Times reported that Sir Rod would state that given a limited transport budget, a high-speed rail link is not the most cost-effective option to obtain higher capacity on the rail network and therefore should not be built. Most of the press continued to take this line when the report was finally published, drawing scorn from both opposition parties, Labour back-benchers and transport pressure groups alike. The report seemed to confirm this:

Significant momentum has built behind the case for a new network of very high-speed rail lines in the UK. This is often associated with new technologies, such as magnetic levitation devices, currently in very limited use in China. The business case is often argued to rest on the transformational impact of such a network on the UK's economic geography. However, new high-speed rail networks in the UK would not significantly change the level of economic connectivity between most parts of the UK, given existing aviation and rail links. Even if a transformation in connectivity could be achieved, the evidence is very quiet on the scale of resulting economic benefit, and in France business use of the high speed train network is low.

Faced with such arguments, supporters of HSLs point to the capacity increases such new lines would deliver in London and selected urban areas by removing some or all interurban trains from commuter and freight lines. Such benefits are likely to be both real and substantial. Crucially though, these goals could be achieved by other solutions, and perhaps at much lower cost. The range of policy measures would include fares pricing policy, signal-based methods of achieving more capacity on the existing network, and conventional solutions to capacity problems e.g. longer trains. Indeed, in keeping with a non-modal approach, the measures assessed should include improvements to other modes that support these journeys (e.g. motorway, bus, and urban access improvements).

New lines – including new very high-speed lines – should take their place within this range of policy measures, and each should be assessed on their merits before selecting the option that offers the greatest returns on investment. An alternative argument is sometimes made on environmental grounds because a very high speed line from London to Scotland could attract modal shift from air. Such arguments must be made with care given that total domestic aviation emissions, including flight between other cities, account for 1.2 per cent of the UK's annual carbon emissions (CO_{2} equivalent), including allowance for the climate change impacts of non-carbon emissions from aviation. Furthermore, rail's energy consumption and carbon emissions increase with speed and this would erode rail's environmental advantage and so it is important to consider the costs involved in reducing carbon emissions in this way.

However, Sir Rod later claimed both to the press and to a parliamentary select committee that he was quoted out of context in reports at the time, had aimed his comments specifically at speculative MagLev options, and in fact was in favour of using conventional high-speed rail to relieve congestion once existing main lines reached capacity.

==== Greengauge 21 study ====
In June 2007, the campaign group Greengauge 21 published a proposal for High Speed Two. It evaluated options for high-speed rail in the UK and recommended an £11bn route from London St Pancras and Heathrow to Birmingham and the North West, which they dubbed HS2. The report recommended the new line be built in the M40/Chiltern Main Line corridor, and used it as the basis for its findings. This route has the greatest strategic advantage, as the Chiltern Main Line is a popular alternative to the WCML from Birmingham to London, and also lends the opportunity to build a branch line to Heathrow Airport, giving the passengers served by the WCML a direct service to one of the world's premier international airports. The WCML is also the corridor which would be under the most pressure in the next 15 – 20 years. A connection to High Speed 1 would allow Eurostar terminals to open in Birmingham and Manchester.

Branching off HS1, it would briefly follow the WCML and GWML, branching off at the connection with the Central line, going to Northolt Junction, where it will follow the Chiltern Main Line and have a triangular junction serving a branch to Heathrow. The line will be tunnelled at Chiltern stations, up till Princes Risborough, where it will incorporate itself with the intercity line, up to Banbury, where it will branch off and hug the M40 and M42, before joining the Birmingham Loop, at Birmingham International/NEC. Links to Milton Keynes and Oxford via the Varsity Line, and Banbury in the middle of the Line, would experience a growth in services. Local services on Chiltern, WCML south of Rugby, and Banbury–Coventry–Birmingham could be intensified.

The new line would enable journey times of:

- London to Birmingham in 45 minutes
- Birmingham to Paris in 3 hours
- London to Manchester (via the WCML after the Trent Valley) in 1 hour 30 minutes
- Manchester to Paris in 3 hours 45 minutes

The line would be built to the continental loading gauge, allowing the use of double-decker trains.

On 3 July 2007 reports appeared in several British newspapers about the UK government's forthcoming 30-year strategy (see below) It was stated that "Britain may need High Speed 2", but that "the strategy will stop short of promising to pay for the line".

In September 2009, Greengauge 21 published a new study into High Speed Rail. This was far more extensive than Network Rail's proposal, calling for a full, integrated high-speed network totalling around 1,500 km (930 mi). Greengauge's plan calls for two north–south corridors from London, which would broadly parallel the ECML and WCML, together with three east–west corridors between London-Bristol, Sheffield-Manchester and Edinburgh-Glasgow. Both the north–south lines would consist of new-built high-speed lines, while the east–west corridors would run on existing lines upgraded to allow 125 mph (201 km/h) running. One of the central parts of the Greengauge 21 proposal is to have it linked directly with High Speed 1, to allow through running to the Channel Tunnel, thus enabling trains to run direct from regional cities to Europe. The draft timetable produced as part of the plan estimates that trains could run between Birmingham and Paris in approximately 3 hours.

- High-Speed North-East – the North-East route would run north from London to Cambridge, with a spur connecting to Stansted Airport and beyond into East Anglia joining up with Great Eastern Main Line at Ipswich and diverting from Stansted towards the East Midlands, stopping at Nottingham and Sheffield. It would then run as far as Leeds, before resuming the route of the ECML towards Newcastle. Between Newcastle and Edinburgh, the route would consist of existing upgraded line rather than new build.
- High-Speed North-West – the North-West route would be completely new build. This would run north towards Birmingham, with a spur to Heathrow Airport, before reaching Manchester and Liverpool. Both of these would be on branches off the main line, with Manchester at a triangular junction; the main line would continue north where it would fork, with branches to Glasgow and Edinburgh, where it would connect with the North-East Line.
- High-Speed West – the Western corridor would consist of existing track upgraded to 125 mph (201 km/h), and would run west out of London stopping at Heathrow, Bristol and Cardiff. A triangular junction at Heathrow would allow access from these western destinations to the North-West route without the need to go via London.
- High-Speed Trans-Pennine – the Trans-Pennine route would be a short corridor of upgraded line connecting Sheffield and Manchester. Both of these would be on triangular junctions, allowing access to all destinations on the North-East and North-West corridors.
- High-Speed Scotland – the Scottish route would be a corridor between Edinburgh and Glasgow, consisting of entirely new-build line.

==== Government White Paper: Delivering a Sustainable Railway ====
In July 2007, the new Transport Secretary, Ruth Kelly, delivered a white paper on the future of the railways. The report outlined the government's strategic plan for the railways until 2037 which recommended "further study" and stated that dedicated magnetic levitation system and freight lines were "too expensive". Amongst the support documentation for the white paper was a report by transport professors Roderick Smith and Roger Kemp which reviewed the options for a MagLev trunk line, particularly those proposed by UK Ultraspeed, and concluded that it was a high-risk option, with a high impact on transport energy use and therefore carbon dioxide emissions.

==== Second Atkins study ====
In March 2008, The Observer and The Sunday Times both reported that a second report for the Department of Transport by Atkins entitled Because Transport Matters showed that the original Option 8 (a high-speed network on both west and east coasts) would give a benefit of £63bn, well in excess of the predicted costs of £31bn. The report suggested building two 300 km/h (190 mph) lines on the East and West coasts. The West coast line would run to Manchester, and the East coast line would run to Edinburgh and Glasgow. Travel times of 71 minutes to Manchester and 74 minutes to Sheffield were mentioned in the report.

==== Network Rail study ====
In August 2009, Network Rail published a study outlining its proposals for the expansion of the railway network. The headline proposal was its plan for a new high-speed rail line between London and Glasgow/Edinburgh, following a route through the West Midlands and the North-West of England. This plan, whereby the new line would follow a similar but not totally parallel route to the West Coast Main Line, would involve trains running from both London and Birmingham as southern termini to Manchester, Liverpool, Glasgow and Edinburgh. Included in the report are draft timings which put Birmingham less than an hour from London, Manchester just over an hour, Liverpool just under 90 minutes, and just over two hours to Glasgow and Edinburgh, with sixteen trains per hour estimated from London, and four trains per hour between the regional cities. The report also looked into the question of services to Heathrow Airport, and came to the conclusion that running all trains from London via Heathrow reduced the benefit of the line by as much as £3 billion. Instead, Network Rail's proposal would entail a short spur from the main line terminating at Heathrow, reducing the road and air traffic to the airport from the cities that the line would serve. Network Rail also outlined the case for not including such areas as Leeds and the North-East of England in the proposal, with two main points:

- The journey time from London to Leeds via Manchester would not be reduced significantly enough over the existing route via the East Coast Main Line to warrant the cost of building the connection.
- Leeds would be the top target market for any proposed high-speed line from London to North-East of England, so building a connection to Leeds would reduce the strength of the case for that.

==== Beyond HS2 Report ====
In May 2018, Greengauge 21 released a report entitled 'Beyond HS2' which looked at how the rail network could develop by 2050. It proposed several projects:

- New High Speed Line from Colchester and Cambridge (via Stansted) to Stratford (possibly extending to Canary Wharf)
- A New Higher Speed Line from Perth and Dundee to the Shotts Line
- A new High Speed Line avoiding Motherwell
- A new connection between the HS2 Eastern Leg and Kingsbury allowing services to continue to Bristol, Cardiff and Plymouth via Cheltenham Spa.
- A new link between WCML and Crossrail
- A new link between Langley and Heathrow
- A new link between Richmond and Waterloo to Heathrow T2
- A new link between Heathrow and Staines
- A new Northern Powerhouse Rail
- A new line between Darlington and Newcastle

=== Northern Powerhouse Rail (HS3) ===
In June 2014, the then Chancellor of the Exchequer, George Osborne proposed a high speed rail link High Speed 3 (HS3) between Liverpool and Newcastle/Sheffield/Hull. The line would utilise the existing route between Liverpool and Newcastle/Hull, and a new route from to Sheffield will follow the same route to Manchester Victoria, and then a new line from Victoria to Sheffield, with additional tunnels and other infrastructure.

Osborne suggested the line should be considered as part of a review of the second phase of High Speed 2. Initial estimates suggested a rail line with a 140 mph (230 km/h) line speed, and Leeds-Manchester journey times reduced to 30 minutes, Osborne estimated the cost to be less per mile than that of HS2, giving a cost of under £6 billion. Initial responses to the proposal were mixed: Jeremy Acklam of the Institution of Engineering and Technology (IET) suggested that plans should look at connecting other northern cities; such as Liverpool, and potentially north-east England via York; commentators noted that the proposal could be viewed as an attempt to gain political support in the north of England in the run-up to the 2015 general election: The Institute of Economic Affairs (IEA) characterised the proposal as a "headline grabbing vanity project designed to attract votes". However the British Chambers of Commerce (BCC), Confederation of British Industry (CBI), and others were cautiously positive about the proposal, but emphasised the need to deliver on existing smaller-scale schemes.

=== Heathrow Airport to Gatwick Airport – High Speed 4Air ===
In 2011, the Department for Transport confirmed that ministers were studying a proposal for a 180 mph (290 km/h) line between London Heathrow and Gatwick Airports. The journey would take 15 minutes and provide the first direct rail link between the two airports. The plan could virtually make Heathrow and Gatwick into a single hub. In 2018 a proposal was put forward by a British engineering consultancy, Expedition Engineering, for HS4Air, a high-speed railway line that would run to the south of Greater London, creating a 140 km (87 mi) link between HS2 and HS1 via Heathrow and Gatwick Airports.

== High speed trains ==
Before the year 2000, there had been three types of high speed trains in Britain:

- Advanced Passenger Train (APT) – Tilting trains which never entered into regular revenue-earning service.
- InterCity 125, also called HST (High Speed Train) – diesel trains consisting of two Class 43 power cars with a rake of Mark 3 coaches between.
- InterCity 225 – electric trains consisting of a Class 91 locomotive and a rake of Mark 4 coaches and Driving Van Trailer.

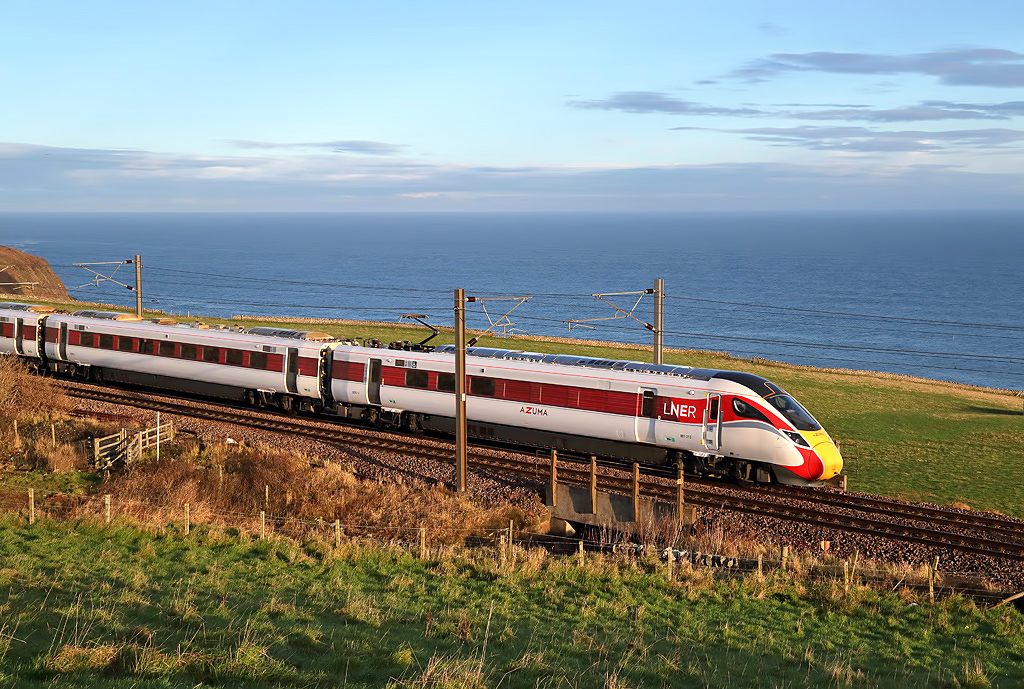
LNER Azuma high-speed train on the East Coast Line

Since 2000, 125 mph (200 km/h) trains that could be classed as high speed (≥200 km/h) trains include:

- Class 180 Adelante
- Class 220 Voyager
- Class 221 Super Voyager
- Class 222 Meridians and Pioneers
- Class 390 Pendolino
- Class 397 Nova 2
- The Hitachi Super Express
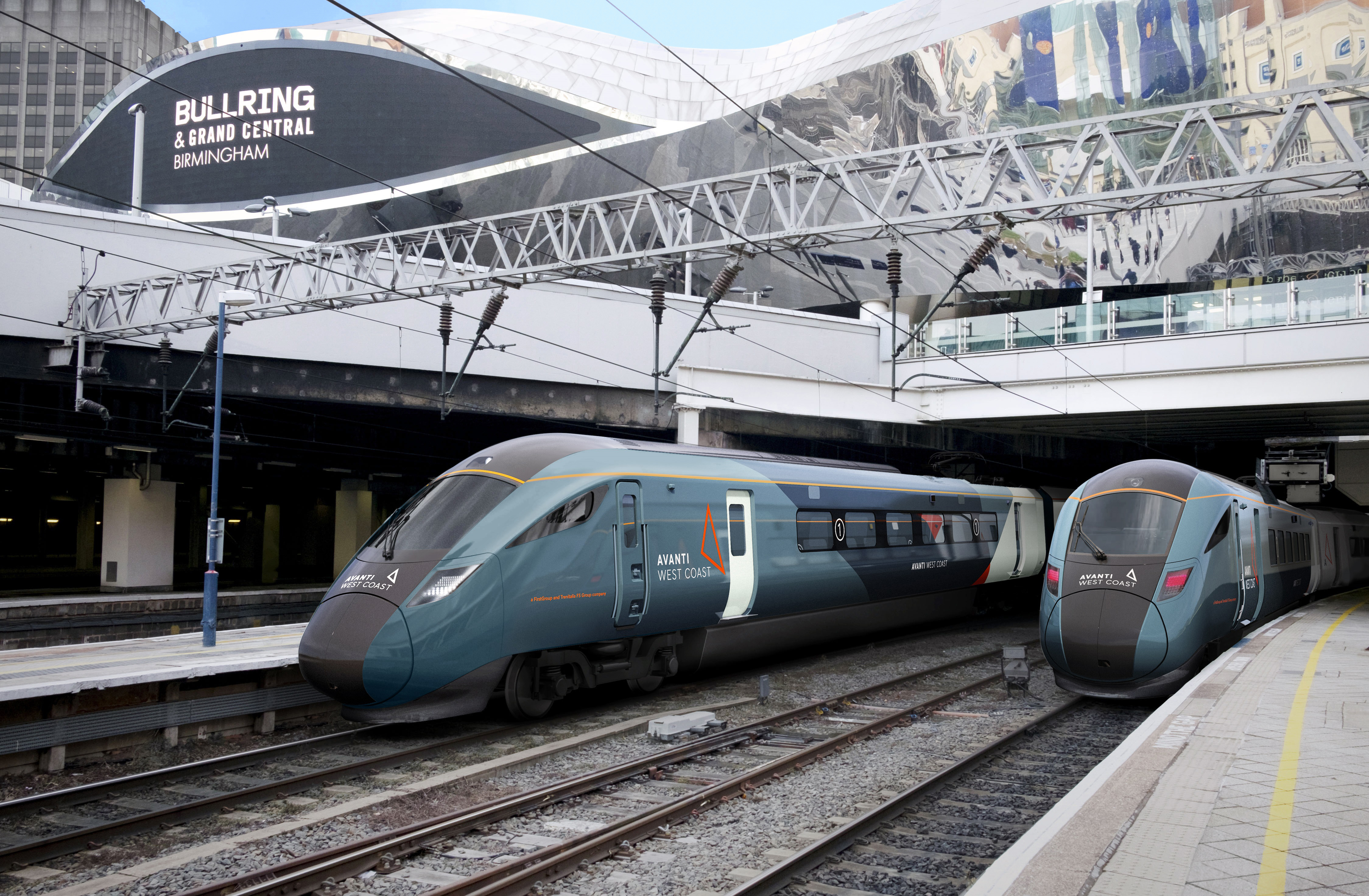
  Avanti West Coast high-speed Hitachi trains in at Birmingham New Street.
  - Class 800
  - Class 801
  - Class 802
  - Class 803
  - Class 805
  - Class 807
  - Class 810

A lot of money and resources were put into fundamental research into vehicle dynamics which, among other advances, led to the development of the APT. The APT achieved high speeds around curves by tilting. Although the prototype was deemed successful and production units were built, they never entered regular service. By this time, development was underway of another train design which became the InterCity 125. The InterCity 125 was planned as a stop-gap. Research had begun for the tilting APT but it was uncertain when it could enter service. The HST applied what had been learned so far to traditional technology – a project parallel to the APT but based on conventional principles while incorporating the newly discovered knowledge of wheel/rail interaction and suspension design. The APT never achieved all its design objectives but the InterCity 125 was a success.

The InterCity 125 was introduced by British Rail between 1976 and 1982, when the maximum speed had previously been 100 mph (160 km/h). The increased top speed and its acceleration and deceleration allowed for shortened journey times. The prototype class 252 (power cars 43000 and 43001) took the world record for diesel traction, achieving 143.2 mph (230 km/h) on 12 June 1973 on the East Coast Main Line between Northallerton and Thirsk. On 1 November 1987 the record was raised to 148.4 mph (238 km/h) by a shortened class 254 set running speed trials between Darlington and York. On 27 September 1985 a shortened class 254 set carrying passengers ran non-stop from Newcastle to London King's Cross, averaging 115.4 mph. HSTs were originally identified as Class 253 (seven trailer cars) used on the GWML and Class 254 (eight trailer cars) used on the ECML.

The InterCity 125 is used on numerous intercity services today while the tilting trains it was supposed to complement and ultimately be replaced by only began to appear on British railways in the early 2000s. However, the aim for the Advanced Passenger Train was to achieve 155 mph (250 km/h) running. Although this was achieved during trials, it was not possible in normal service in the UK due to the shortness of British signal spacing, apart from the dedicated CTRL.

The earliest replacement of InterCity 125s started with the introduction of the InterCity 225, between 1988 and 1991 in conjunction with electrification of the East Coast Main Line.

More recently, some InterCity 125s have been replaced or supplemented by:

- Class 180 Adelante – built 2000-2001 for Great Western Railway, also operated by Grand Central.
- Class 220 Voyager – built 2000-2001 for Virgin CrossCountry, now operated by CrossCountry.
- Class 221 Super Voyager – built 2001-2002 for Virgin CrossCountry, also operated by CrossCountry, Avanti West Coast and Grand Central.
- Class 222 Meridian – built 2002-2004 for Midland Mainline, now operated by East Midlands Railway.

=== Future trains ===
After units such as the Intercity 125 were retired, GWR replaced them with Class 800 and Class 802 Hitachi units. LNER replaced their units with Class 800 and Class 801 units. East Midlands Railway replaced theirs with Class 180 units, as an interim solution until Class 810 units are built.

Avanti West Coast have replaced their Class 221 Bombardier Voyagers with new Hitachi Class 805 and Class 807 units. The Class 805 units have entered service, and the Class 221 units are fully removed from service.

TransPennine Express decided to move from operating commuter trains to high speed trains, with Class 802 and Class 397 units coming in. These units allowed TransPennine Express to begin services up the East Coast Main Line to Edinburgh from Manchester Piccadilly.

High Speed 2 will have new rolling stock. The bidding process included Alstom, CAF, Hitachi, Siemens and Talgo. In December 2021, the contract for HS2 rolling stock was awarded to a joint venture between Hitachi and Alstom, for a development of the Zefiro 300.

=== Intercity Express Programme (IEP) ===
On 8 March 2007, the Department for Transport invited bidders to participate in the Intercity Express Programme or IEP. This is a project to replace the ageing InterCity 125 and subsequently InterCity 225 fleets with a new high-speed train designed to operate on the ECML, GWML and Cross Country routes. The project grew out of discussions between FirstGroup and Siemens in the early years of the decade, later being taken over by the SRA and DfT.

On 12 February 2009, the DfT announced that Agility Trains, a consortium led by Hitachi, was the preferred bidder, with a train named the Hitachi Super Express. In February 2010 it was announced the programme was suspended pending an independent report, with a decision on its viability to be given after the 2010 General Election.

=== Overview of rolling stock ===
The following table lists the rolling stock operating or having operated in Great Britain that is capable of a top speed of 125 mph or greater:

TOPS Classification	Name	Type	Max. recorded speed (mph (km/h))	Max. design speed (mph (km/h))	Max. speed in UK service (mph (km/h))
Class 43	InterCity 125	Diesel locomotive	148 (238)	125 (201)	125 (201)
Class 67		Diesel locomotive	143 (230)	125 (201)	125 (201)
Class 91	InterCity 225	Electric locomotive	162 (261)	140 (225)	125 (201)
Class 180	Grand Central Adelante	DHMU	125 (201)	125 (201)	125 (201)
Class 220	CrossCountry Voyager	DEMU	125 (201)	125 (201)	125 (201)
Class 221	CrossCountry / Avanti West Coast / Grand Central Super Voyager	DEMU	125 (201)	125 (201)	125 (201)
Class 222	EMR Meridian	DEMU	125 (201)	125 (201)	125 (201)
Class 373	Eurostar e300	EMU	209 (334.7)	186 (300)	186 (300)
Class 374	Eurostar e320	EMU	219 (352)	200 (320)	186 (300)
Class 390	Avanti West Coast Pendolino	EMU	162 (261)	140 (225)	125 (201)
Class 395	Southeastern Javelin	EMU	157 (252)	140 (225)	140 (225)
Class 397	TransPennine Express Nova 2	EMU	none set	125 (201)	125 (201)
Class 800	GWR Intercity Express Train (IET); LNER Azuma	BMU	none set	140 (225)	125 (201)
Class 801	LNER Azuma	EMU	none set	140 (225)	125 (201)
Class 802	GWR Intercity Express Train (IET); TransPennine Express Nova 1 Hull Trains Paragon	BMU	none set	140 (225)	125 (201)
Class 803	Lumo (unnamed)	EMU	none set	140 (225)	125 (201)
Class 805	Avanti West Coast Evero	BMU	none set	140 (225)	125 (201)
Class 807	Avanti West Coast Evero	EMU	none set (under construction)	140 (225)	125 (201)
Class 810	EMR Aurora	BMU	none set (under construction)	140 (225)	125 (201)
Mark 3	InterCity 125	Coach	148 (238)	125 (201)	125 (201)
Mark 4	InterCity 225	Coach	162 (261)	140 (225)	125 (201)
Mark 5A	TransPennine Express Nova 3	Coach	125 (201)	125 (201)	100 (160)

== HSR promoters ==
The recent interest in high-speed rail generated by the success of the CTRL has led to the formation of several companies and non-profit groups aiming to further the construction of domestic high-speed lines in Britain. The principal groups are:

=== Greengauge 21 ===
Greengauge 21 is a non-profit group aiming to establish conventional high-speed wheel-on-rail technology as the mode of choice for new lines. The group has performed studies on routeing, environmental issues and the use of high-speed rail as an alternative to short-haul airlines.

The group made recommendations that were incorporated into the planning of High Speed 2.

=== Eleven cities campaign ===
Eleven big cities announced a joint campaign for a high-speed rail network serving the entire of Great Britain on 9 September 2009. Birmingham, Bristol, Cardiff, Edinburgh, Glasgow, Leeds, Liverpool, Manchester, Newcastle, Nottingham and Sheffield stated as their goal that The campaign will be deliberately focused on the importance of building a whole network to link all our major economic centres together, not simply a sterile debate about where a first route should go.

== Accidents and incidents ==
- Southall rail crash – on 19 September 1997, a Great Western Trains InterCity 125 operating a service from Swansea to London Paddington failed to stop at a red signal and collided with a freight train entering Southall goods yard. Seven people were killed and 139 were injured. The train driver, Larry Harrison, was charged with manslaughter (he had been distracted as he had bent down to pack his bag), but the case was dropped. Great Western Trains was fined £1.5 million for violations of health and safety law in connection with the accident.
- Ladbroke Grove rail crash – just over two years later, and only a few miles east of Southall, on 5 October 1999, a First Great Western Intercity 125 from Cheltenham Spa to Paddington collided almost head-on with a Thames Trains service from Paddington to Bedwyn after the latter train had passed a signal at danger. With 31 people killed and 417 injured, it was one of the worst rail accidents in 20th-century British history. On 5 April 2004, Thames Trains was fined a record £2 million after admitting violations of health and safety law in connection with the accident and ordered to pay £75,000 in legal costs. On 31 October 2006, Network Rail (the successor body to Railtrack, formed in the wake of a subsequent train crash at Hatfield) pleaded guilty to charges under the Health and Safety at Work etc. Act 1974 in relation to the accident. It was fined £4 million on 30 March 2007 and ordered to pay £225,000 in legal costs.
- Hatfield rail crash – on 17 October 2000, a Great North Eastern Railway (GNER) InterCity 225 train bound for Leeds had left London King's Cross and was travelling along the East Coast Main Line at approximately 115 mph (185 km/h) when it derailed south of Hatfield station. The primary cause of the accident was later determined to be the left-hand rail fracturing as the train passed over it. Four passengers died and 70 were injured. The aftermath of the accident saw widespread speed limit reductions throughout the rail network and a tightening of health and safety procedures, the repercussions of which were still felt years later. In 2005, both Railtrack and the contractor Balfour Beatty were found guilty of breaching health and safety laws.
- Great Heck rail crash – on 28 February 2001, an InterCity 225 passenger train operated by Great North Eastern Railway (GNER) travelling from Newcastle to London collided with a Land Rover Defender which had crashed down a motorway embankment onto the railway line at Great Heck, near Selby. It was consequently derailed into the path of an oncoming freight train, colliding at an estimated closing speed of 142 mph (229 km/h). Ten people were killed, including the drivers of both trains, and 82 were seriously injured. It remains the worst rail disaster of the 21st century in the United Kingdom. The Land Rover driver, Gary Hart, who escaped the incident unscathed, was later tried at Leeds Crown Court on ten counts of causing death by dangerous driving. Hart was found guilty on 13 December 2001, and was sentenced to five years in prison and a five-year driving ban. He was released from prison in July 2004 after serving half of his sentence.
- Ufton Nervet rail crash – on 6 November 2004, an InterCity 125 (HST) from Plymouth to Paddington collided with a stationary Mazda 323 at an automatic level crossing close to the rural West Berkshire village of Ufton Nervet. The inquest concluded that the crash was caused by Brian Drysdale, a chef at Wokefield Park Hotel 3 miles (4.8 km) away, committing suicide by parking his car on the crossing. All eight coaches derailed and the rear of the 220-metre (720 ft) InterCity 125 train came to rest about 100 m (110 yd) beyond the crossing. Seven people were killed in the crash: the car's driver, the driver of the train, and five of its passengers. Official estimates put the number of people on board at 180 to 200. About half of these were injured, 12 of them seriously.
- Grayrigg derailment – on 23 February 2007, a Virgin West Coast Pendolino West Coast Main Line InterCity service from London Euston to Glasgow Central derailed just to the south of Grayrigg, Cumbria, in North West England. One person was killed, and 30 seriously injured. The accident investigation concluded that the derailment was caused by a faulty set of points (number 2B) on the Down Main running line, controlled from Lambrigg ground frame. The scheduled inspection on 18 February 2007 had not taken place and the faults had gone undetected. On 4 April 2012, Network Rail was fined a total of £4,118,037 including costs for "the company's failure to provide and implement suitable and sufficient standards, procedures, guidance, training, tools and resources for the inspection and maintenance of fixed stretcher bar points".

== See also ==
- High Speed 1
- High Speed 2
- High-speed rail
- High-speed rail in Europe
- High-speed rail in the United States
- Integrated Rail Plan for the North and Midlands
- Northern Powerhouse Rail
- Rail transport in Great Britain
