= Alstom Coradia Juniper =

Series of British electric trains manufactured by Alstom

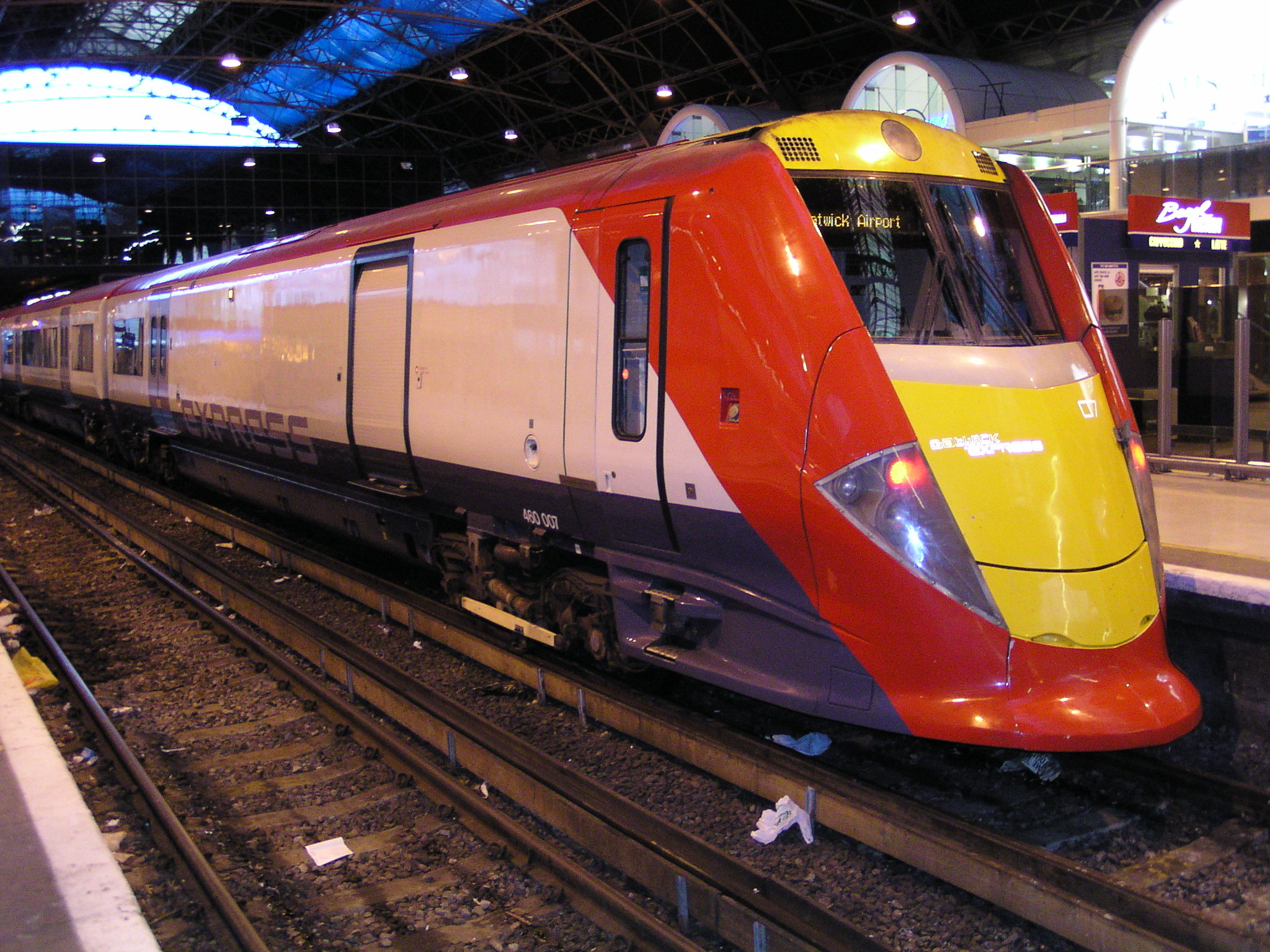
- A Class 460 (8-GAT) train at London Victoria.
- In service: 2000 - Present
- Manufacturer: Alstom
- Family name: Coradia
- Constructed: 1998-2002
- Number built: 78 trainsets
- Operators: South Western Railway; ScotRail

Specifications
- Electric systems: 25 kV 50 Hz AC overhead lines (Class 334); 750 V DC third rail (Class 458/460)
- Current collection: Pantograph (AC; 334); Contact shoe (DC; 458/460)
- Track gauge: 1,435 mm (4 ft 8 1/2 in) standard gauge

The Alstom Coradia Juniper series is a family of electric multiple unit trains built by Alstom Transport Birmingham for use on the railway network in Great Britain. The family is related to the Coradia 1000 series of diesel multiple units.

There are currently two types in service with various TOCs, with a total of 71 units in service (31 class 458s and 40 class 334s). All Class 460s were converted to Class 458/5s for South Western Railway.

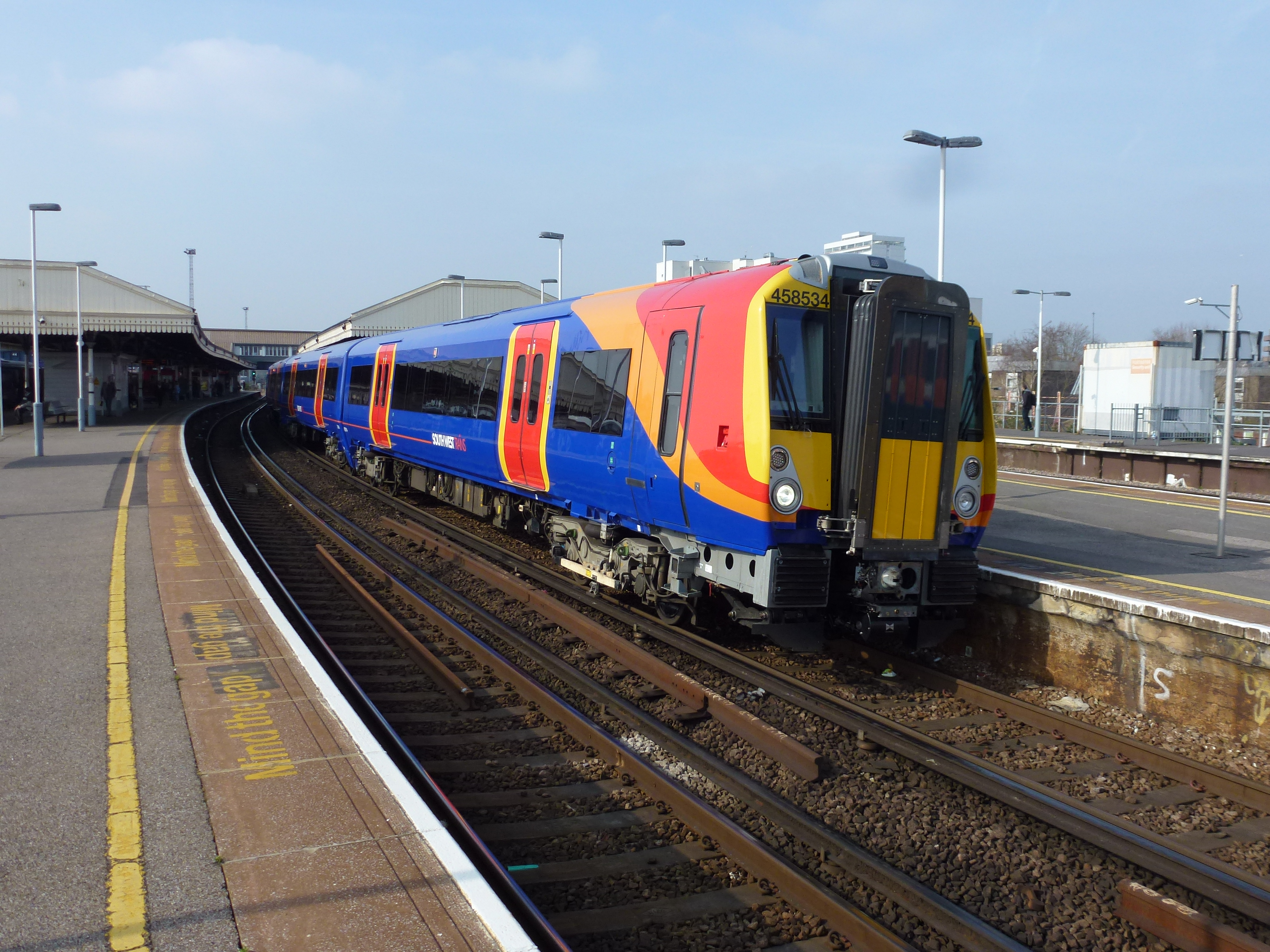
The result of the rebuilt of 4JOP and 8GAT units: the Class 458/5 5JOP; all Class 458/0 and Class 460 units were converted into this design

== Variants ==
=== Class 334 ===
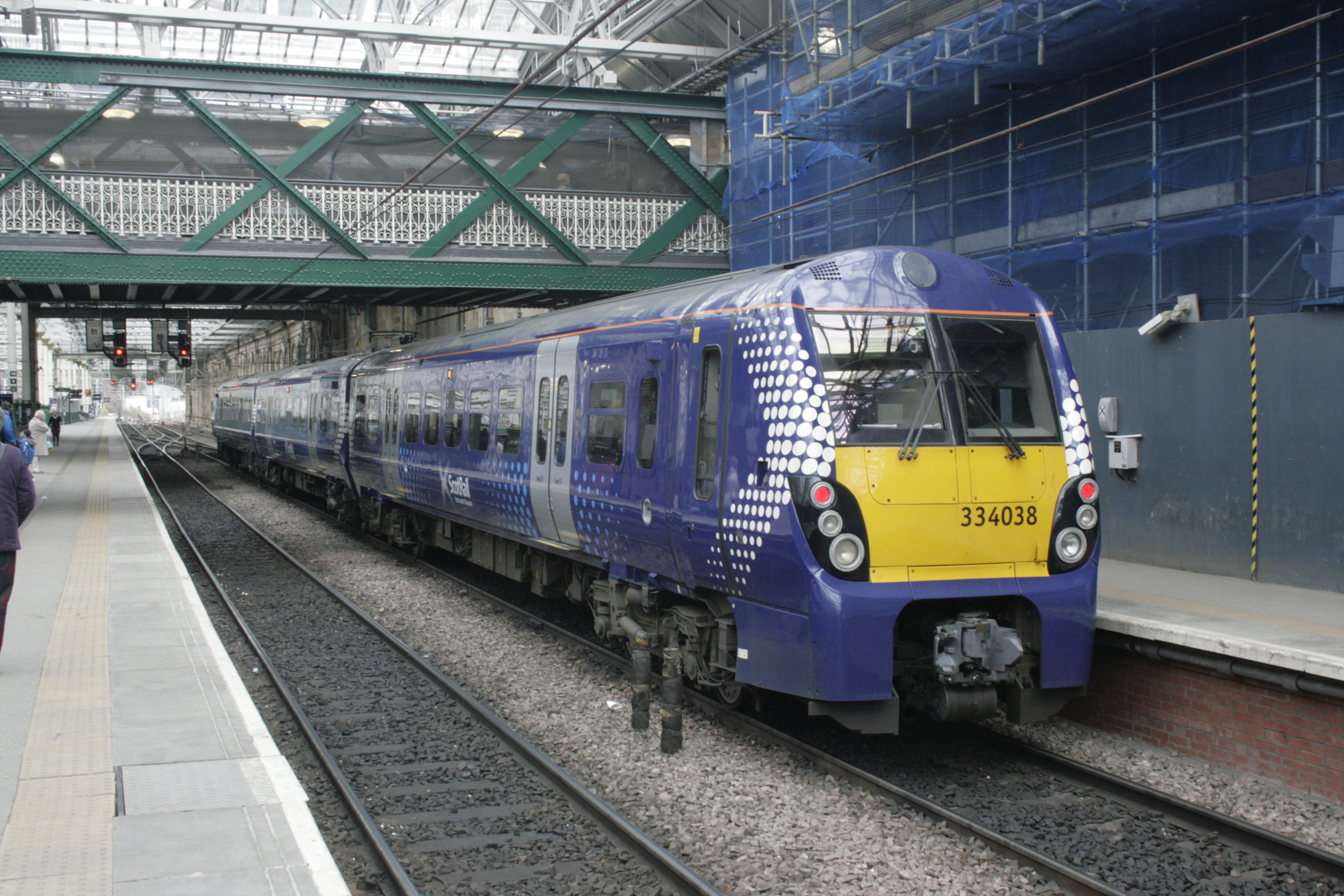
Class 334 unit 334038 at Edinburgh Waverley

The Class 334 is an EMU in service with ScotRail on the suburban network around Glasgow, mainly operating services from Edinburgh Waverley via Airdrie and Bathgate on the North Clyde Line and some services on the Argyle Line. Class 334 trains are powered using 25 kV 50 Hz AC overhead wires. A total of 40 three car units are in use (numbered 001–040), of which 38 were delivered starting in 1999, although due to teething problems, they did not enter service until 2001. The technical issues resulted in two extra units being delivered as compensation.

=== Class 458 ===
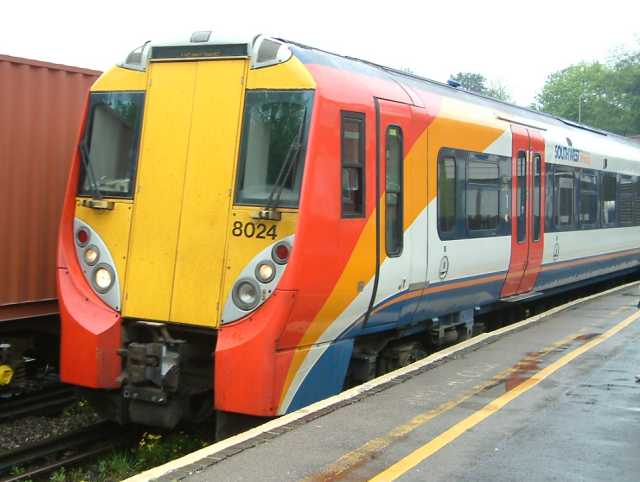
Class 458/0 Coradia Juniper before conversion into 458/5

The Class 458 Coradia Juniper (also known as 5JUP) is operated by South Western Railway on services from London Waterloo to Reading, Weybridge, Windsor & Eton Riverside, and circular metro routes from Waterloo via Richmond and Hounslow. As with all electrically powered trains on the former Southern Region, the Class 458 units are powered using 750 V DC third rail. Initially, a total of thirty 4-car units were built, with deliveries beginning in 1998, with the full complement in service by 2004. However, they suffered from leaky roofs and failing electronics and were therefore stored from 2004 to late 2005, being replaced by more Class 450 units on the routes they operated. For a brief period, they were subleased to Gatwick Express, but were never used on Gatwick Express Services.

In 2013, former operator South West Trains and Porterbrook began the process of creating a new, 36-strong fleet of 5-car trains by reforming and partially rebuilding the vehicles from the Class 458 and Class 460 fleets; by creating 30 units utilising the original Class 458/0 vehicles, with an extra ex-Class 460 vehicle per unit to create 5-car units, and an additional six new 5-car units created entirely from ex-Class 460 stock. The new units have been renumbered as the Class 458/5. They entered service in March 2014. Work included complete reconstruction of cabs and gangways, as well as changes to the passenger areas. The units are painted into the same livery as the Class 450 units (they previously were painted in the South West Trains Express livery carried by the Class 444, 158 and 159 units). This process was completed in 2016. The original 30 ex-Class 458/0 units are numbered 458501–458530, and are distinguishable from the ex-Class 460 stock (458531-458536) by noting the different ribbon-glazed windows on ex-Class 460 units, different door window sizes and the lack of a pantograph recess on ex-Class 460 units. This means that if future conversion to OHLE is required for this fleet, the process will be much simpler on 458501-458530 than 458531–458536.

All units are now in South Western Railway - branded South West Trains livery, and were due to be replaced on all South Western Railway routes by new Class 701 units from 2019 to 2020. During March 2021 SWR cancelled the withdrawal plans of their 458s and instead returned their Class 442s to their lessor. SWR cited that 458s would be their replacement

=== Class 460 ===
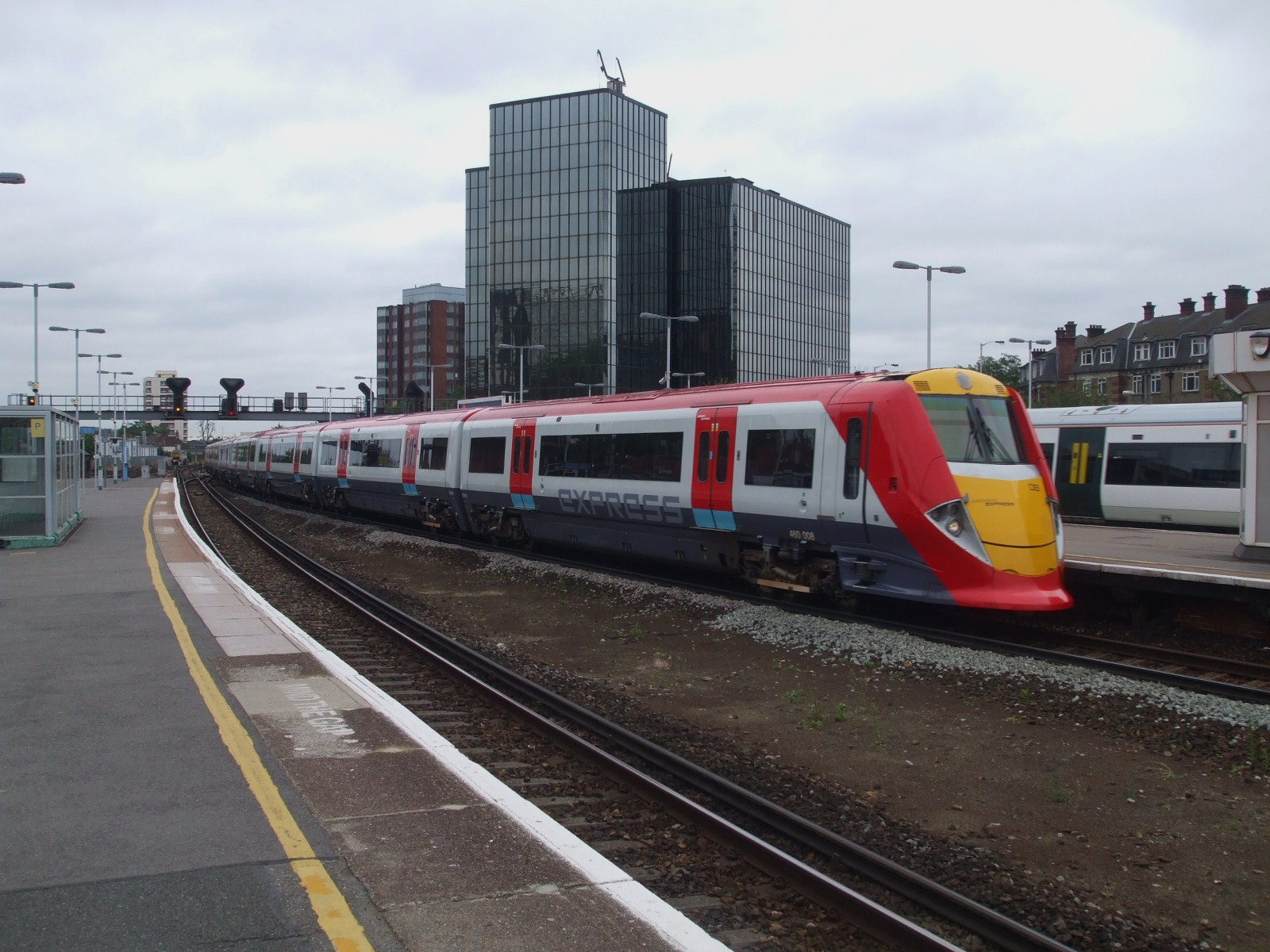
Class 460 Coradia Juniper unit before converting into Class 458/5, in service on Gatwick Express

The Class 460 Coradia Juniper electric multiple units (also known as 8GAT) were originally built for use on the dedicated Gatwick Express airport service to London Victoria. The units were delivered between 2000 and 2001 and like the similar Class 458 they were powered using 750 V DC third rail. The fleet consisted of eight units in total numbered 460001–008, each formed of eight vehicles (driving motor luggage van, two intermediate 1st-class/composite trailers, two intermediate 2nd-class motor carriages, an intermediate 2nd-class trailer, another 2nd-class motor carriage, and a 2nd-class driving motor).

Following their removal from the Gatwick Express franchise in September 2012 a decision was made to reform and merge the Class 460s with the Class 458 vehicles in order to form 36 x 5-car trains to boost capacity on the South West Trains network. The first two of the 5-car sets were delivered in October 2013. Passenger service had started in March 2014.
