= British Rail Class 802 =

British bi-mode multiple unit

British Rail Class 802 Intercity Express Train Nova 1 Paragon
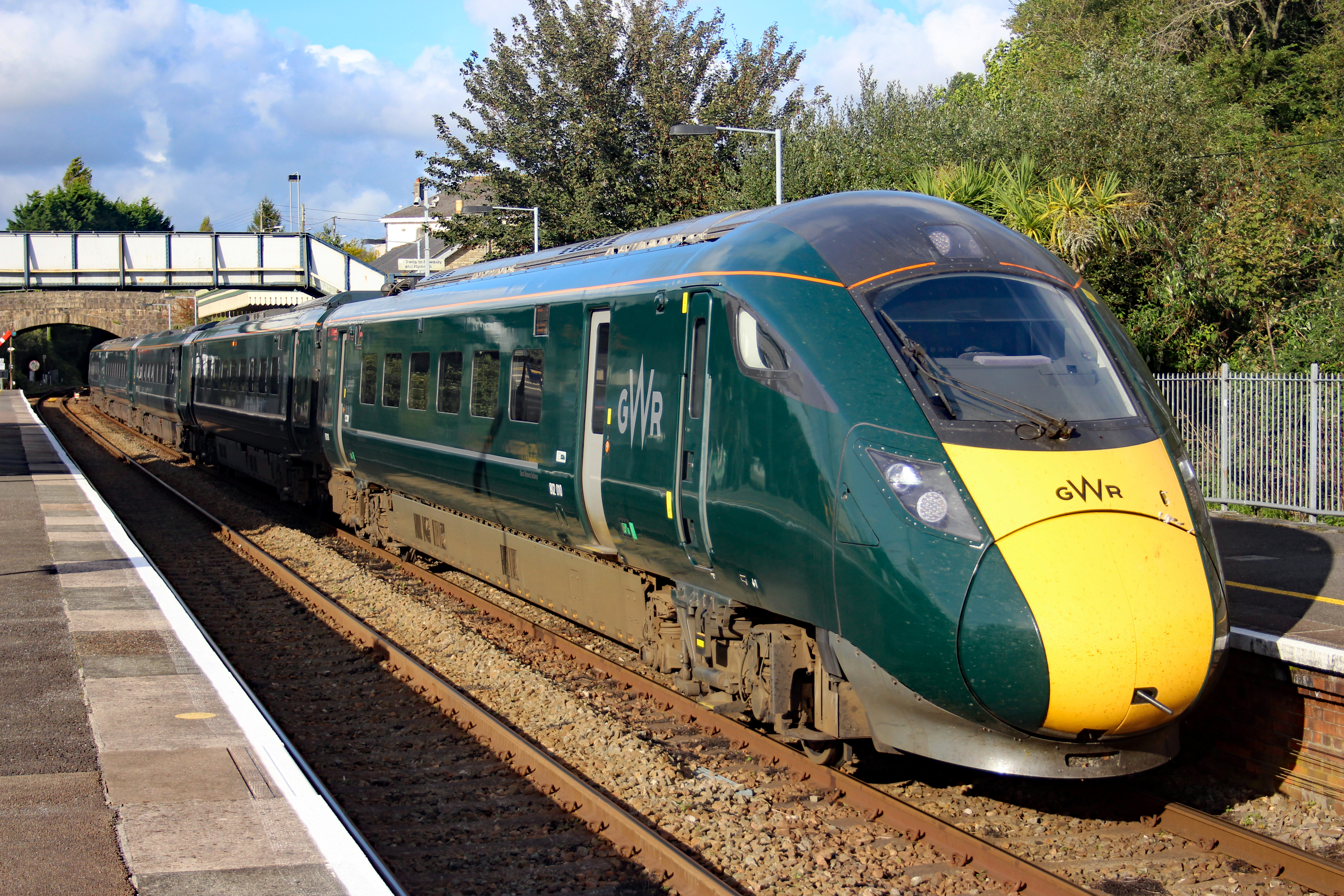
- Great Western Railway Class 802 at Par

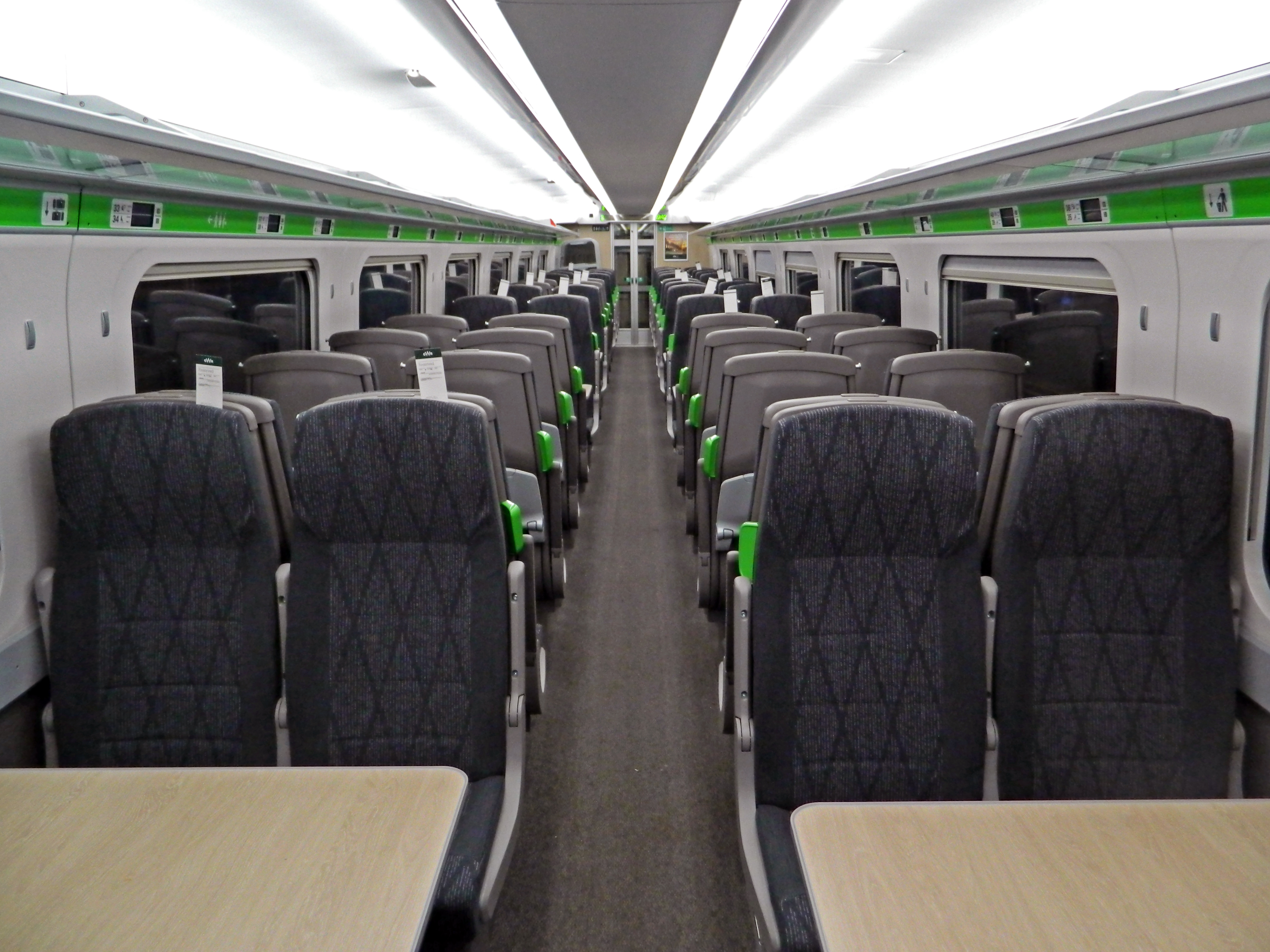
- The standard-class interior of a GWR Class 802 unit
- In service: 18 August 2018–present
- Manufacturer: Hitachi Rail
- Built at: Kudamatsu, Japan; Pistoia, Italy
- Family name: AT300
- Replaced: Class 180; InterCity 125; Mark 5A carriages
- Constructed: 2017–2020
- Number built: 60; (22 × 802/0, 14 × 802/1, 19 × 802/2, 5 × 802/3)
- Formation: 5 cars per 802/0 and 802/3 unit: DPTS-MS-MS-MC-DPTF; 9 cars per 802/1 unit: DPTS-MS-MS-TS-MS-TS-MS-MF-DPTF; 5 cars per 802/2 unit: DPTS-MS-MS-MS-DPTF
- Fleet numbers: 802001–802022; 802101–802114; 802201–802219; 802301–802305
- Capacity: 802/0: 326 seats (36 first class, 290 standard); 802/1: 647 seats (71 first class, 576 standard); 802/2: 342 seats (24 first class, 318 standard); 802/3: 327 seats (43 first class, 284 standard)
- Owners: 802/0 & /1: Eversholt Rail Group; 802/2 & /3: Angel Trains
- Operators: Great Western Railway; Hull Trains; TransPennine Express
- Depots: GWR: Laira (Plymouth); HT: Bounds Green (London); TPE: Doncaster Carr
- Lines served: Cornish Main Line; East Coast Main Line; Great Western Main Line; North Trans-Pennine Route

Specifications
- Car body construction: Aluminium
- Car length: Driving vehicles: 25.7 m (84 ft 4 in); Intermediate vehicles: 26 m (85 ft 4 in)
- Doors: Single-leaf pocket sliding (2 per side per car)
- Maximum speed: 125 mph (200 km/h)
- Weight: 5-car units: 243 tonnes (239 long tons; 268 short tons); 9-car units: 438 tonnes (431 long tons; 483 short tons)
- Prime movers: MTU 12V 1600 R80L (3 per 5-car unit, 5 per 9-car unit)
- Engine type: 4-stroke V12 turbo-diesel with SCR
- Displacement: 21 L (1,284 cu in) per engine
- Power output: 700 kW (940 hp) per engine
- Acceleration: 1 m/s^{2} (2.2 mph/s)
- Electric system: 25 kV 50 Hz AC overhead
- Current collection: Pantograph
- Safety systems: AWS; BR ATP (GWR units only); ETCS; TPWS
- Coupling system: Dellner 10
- Multiple working: Within class
- Track gauge: 1,435 mm (4 ft 8 1/2 in) standard gauge

The British Rail Class 802 is a type of high-speed bi-mode multiple-unit passenger train designed and produced by the Japanese manufacturer Hitachi Rail. The type has been operated by Great Western Railway, TransPennine Express, and Hull Trains, and each of the train operating companies has given the units their own unique brand: Great Western Railway's units are branded Intercity Express Trains (IETs), TransPennine Express units are branded Nova 1s and Hull Trains' units are branded Paragons.

The Class 802 is based on the design of the Hitachi A-train, being a member of the Hitachi AT300 product family. They are near-identical to the preceding Class 800, the primary difference between the two being the diesel engines originally set to a higher power output and enlarged fuel tanks for their intended use on lengthier unelectrified stretches of railway. The introduction of Class 802s by Great Western Railway facilitated the replacement of ageing Intercity 125 high-speed trains, and enabled a reduction of journey times.

Various enhancement and modification schemes have been both implemented and proposed. Both Great Western Railway and TransPennine Express have agreed to participate in trials of battery train technology that, dependent on results, may see fleetwide adoption. In the event of large-scale electrification being funded and implemented during the train's service life, it is practical for some of the engines to be removed from Class 802 sets if rendered surplus, which would reduce their overall weight by 15% and thus raise operational efficiency. Furthermore, while the Class 802s presently have an initial maximum speed of 125 mph (201 km/h), if infrastructure upgrades were to permit greater speeds at a future date, they have the capability of being modified for operating at 140 mph (230 km/h).

== History ==
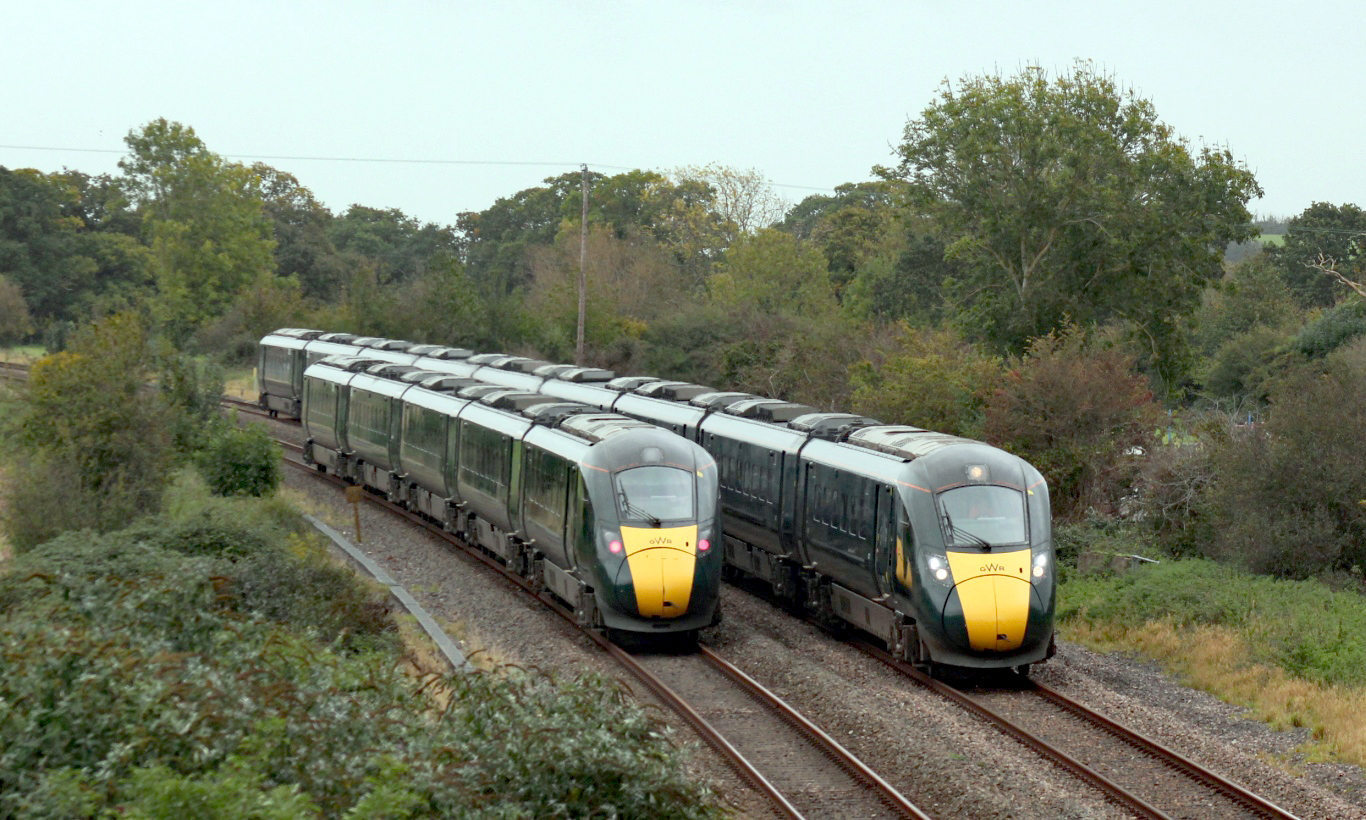
Five- and nine-car sets passing near Creech St Michael

During mid-2015, the train operator Great Western Railway (GWR) announced that it had arranged to procure 173 new rail vehicles from Hitachi Rail, along with options for an additional 150. At the time, GWR was in the early stages of introducing a new fleet of intercity trains as part of the Department for Transport's Intercity Express Programme.

This project involved the procurement of both wholly electric units (Class 801), and "bi-mode" trains (Class 800), powered by electric traction motors capable of running from overhead electric wires or on-board diesel generators. These trains were intended to replace the existing High Speed Trains following the electrification of the Great Western Main Line. However, electrification will only go as far as Cardiff Central, while the route beyond Cardiff continued to require diesel traction (hence the need to procure trains capable of operating without overhead wires).

The purchase of 173 additional vehicles was with the intention that these new bi-mode trains, similar to the Class 800s, would be used on services into Devon and Cornwall. These trains would consist of 22 five-car and 7 nine-car units. The option for a further 150 vehicles would be formed into another 30 five-car units.

Initially, because the Hitachi Newton Aycliffe manufacturing facility in County Durham was at capacity, the intention was to build the trains at the Kasado factory in Kudamatsu in Japan. However, following Hitachi's purchase of the Italian train manufacturer AnsaldoBreda, construction was moved to Hitachi's newly acquired Pistoia plant, from which the first unit was reportedly completed in February 2018.

The trains were scheduled to enter service with GWR from 2018. One of the stated aims of the procurement was the reduction of journey times, such as between London and Exeter by up to five minutes, London and Plymouth by up to six minutes, and London and Penzance by up to 14 minutes.

== Operations ==
The Class 802s are broadly the same as the Class 800 bi-mode trains produced for the Intercity Express Programme, and have been operated in a similar manner; they are run as electric trains wherever possible, and are equipped with diesel generator units identical to those on the Class 800. However, they are furnished with engines that have a higher operating power – 700 kW (940 hp) per engine as opposed to GWR's 800s' original 560 kW (750 hp) (since increased), along with the addition of larger fuel tanks; these enable the Class 802s to better handle the steeper gradients and extended running in diesel mode that has been anticipated on the lengthy non-electrified stretches on which they are typically operated.

=== Great Western Railway ===
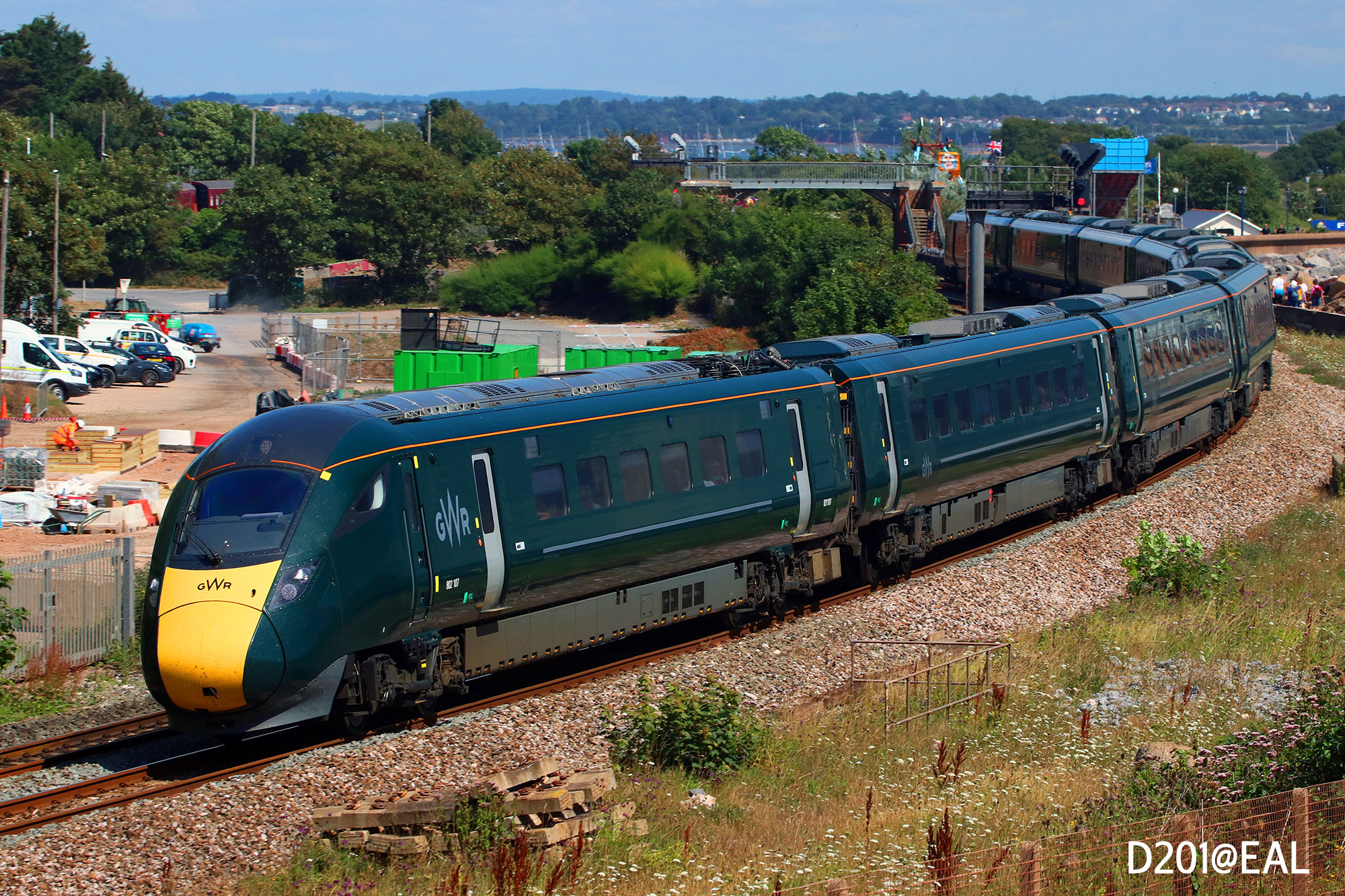
Great Western Railway Class 802 passes Langstone Rock at Dawlish Warren

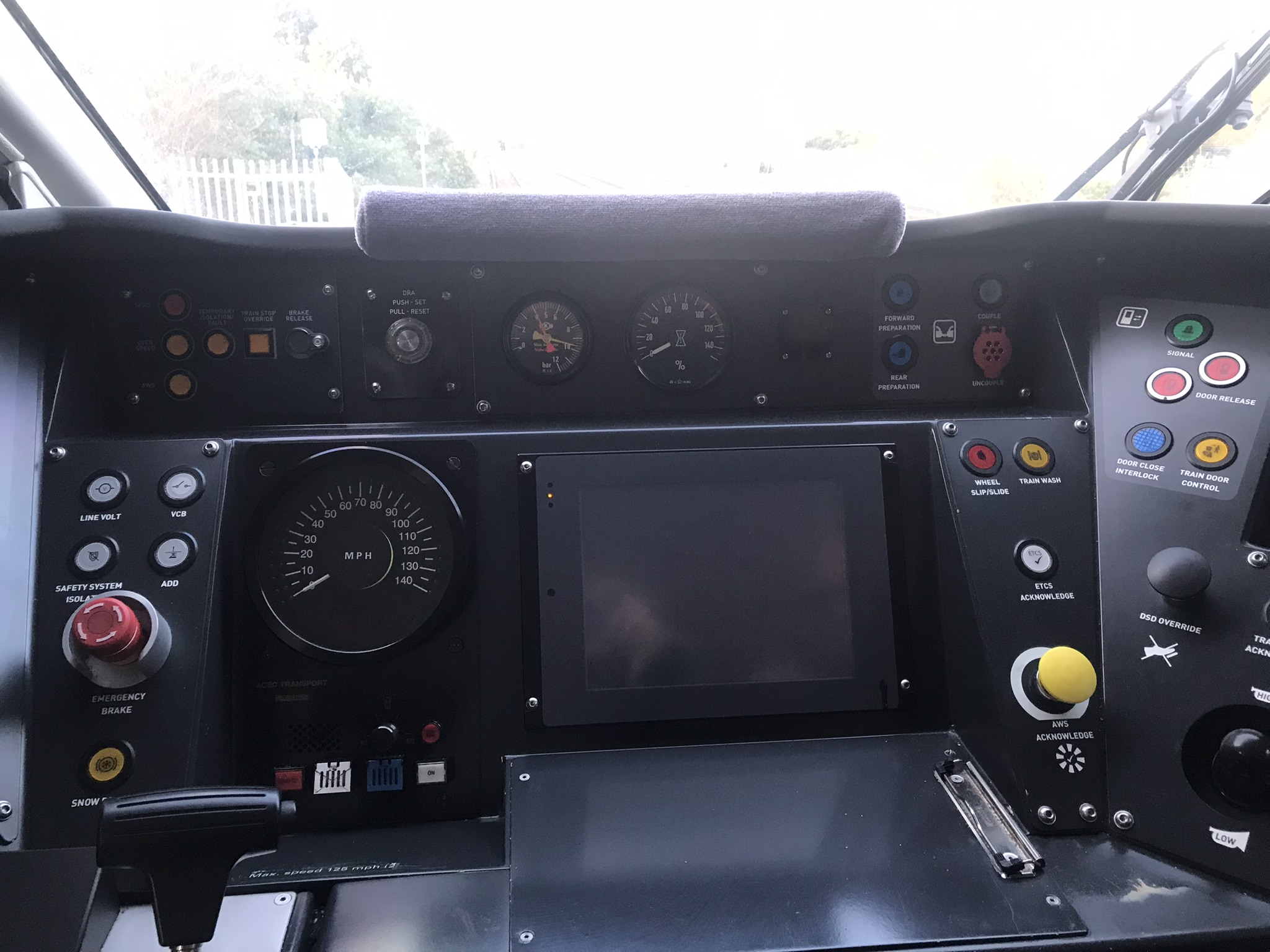
Cab of a GWR Class 802

During 2017, GWR took delivery of 22 five-car and 14 nine-car sets. This was an increase from the 29 sets that had been initially ordered in 2015. In August 2017, main-line testing of the Class 802 commenced in Somerset. They were due to be introduced on 16 July 2018. On 17 August 2018, a demonstration run for invited guests from Penzance to Exeter St Davids was conducted.

During the following day, the first two units (802 006 and 802 007) entered traffic, conducting a Bristol Temple Meads to Swansea service. The same units were first used in passenger service in Cornwall on 20 August 2018, on a service from London Paddington to Penzance and return. By May 2019, all 36 of the sets had entered service, which allowed them to finish replacing the remaining InterCity 125 sets, alongside the Class 800 units.

In December 2020, it was announced that Hitachi and the Eversholt Rail Group would replace one under-floor diesel engine on each of the 22 five-car 802/0 sets with a battery, converting the units to a tri-mode multiple unit. As a result, pollution and noise levels will be reduced and fuel savings of up to 20% are expected to be achieved. In April 2022, new sidings in Penzance to better facilitate the operation of GWR's nine-car Class 802 sets to Cornwall were announced.

Throughout 2021, many of GWR's intercity services were disrupted after cracks were found in the 800s and 802s, due to stress corrosion and fatigue.

In April 2023, it was announced that all 36 units would be maintained at the Laira Traction and Rolling Stock Maintenance Depot in Plymouth.

=== TransPennine Express ===
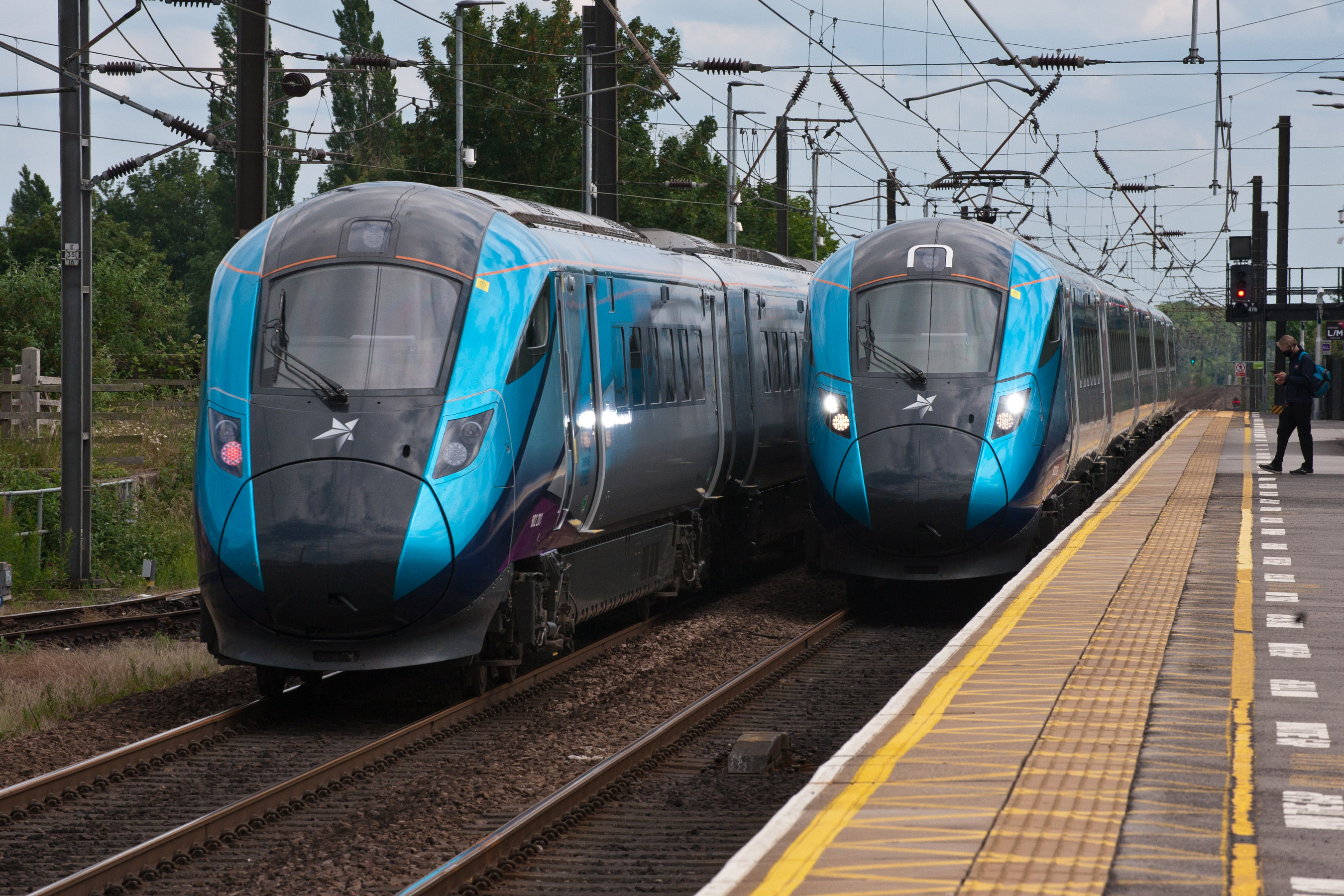
TransPennine Express Class 802s pass each other at Northallerton.

In March 2016, the train operator First TransPennine Express announced the awarding of a contract to Hitachi Rail Europe and leasing company Angel Trains for the supply of 19 five-car Class 802 sets, which would be primarily operated on the North Transpennine route between Liverpool, Manchester, Leeds, Newcastle and Edinburgh. It had been ordered as one part of plans to bolster route capacity by 80%. According to Robin Davis, TPE's Head of New Trains, a major rationale behind the Nova 1 fleet was its bi-mode capability, noting that electrification ambitions often had much uncertainty, while a bi-mode fleet eliminated the operational risk to such uncertainty.

While these trains were initially given the Class 803 designation, they were officially re-designated as Class 802/2 prior to the delivery of the first unit. During December 2017, it was announced that production of the first unit for the operator had begun. In July 2018, testing of the type commenced on the East Coast Main Line. TransPennine Express has branded its new overall fleet Nova, each of the new types being designated either '1', '2' or '3' - the Class 802s being called Nova 1.

During July 2019, TransPennine Express formally accepted the first of its Class 802 trainset. As per the original schedule, the fleet was due to enter service from summer 2019. On 28 September 2019, the first Nova 1 entered revenue-earning service; unit 802201 worked the 06:03 from Newcastle to Liverpool Lime Street as well as the return 09:25 service. Clearance for the service had only been received the evening beforehand. Regular scheduled working commenced shortly thereafter.

During October 2021, it was announced that TransPennine Express, Hitachi, and Angel Trains had agreed to convert one of the former's Nova 1 trainsets into a battery hybrid train on a trial basis with the aim of supporting the technology's further development. If successful, Hitachi and Angel Trains have proposed the retrofitting of the entire fleet. In January 2022, reports emerged that the Nova 1 fleet was operating under diesel power even when operating on entirely electrified sections of the East Coast Main Line on account of the insufficient power supplies present along the line; national railway infrastructure owner Network Rail is reportedly set to complete upgrades to the power supplies within two years.

The fleet is also set to benefit from the rollout of electrification under the Transpennine route upgrade scheme. The company's management has noted that, in the event of largescale electrification being funded and implemented, the Class 802s could have some of their engines removed to reduce roughly 15% of their weight and thus raise their efficiency. Furthermore, Leo Goodwin, former TPE managing director, has observed that while the Class 802s have an initial maximum speed of 125 mph (201 km/h), they have the capability of being modified for operating at 140 mph (230 km/h) if infrastructure upgrades were to permit such speeds at a future date.

On 24 May 2024, one Nova 1 unit was converted to a tri-mode train by replacing one of the engines with a battery pack supplied by Turntide Technologies.

=== Hull Trains ===
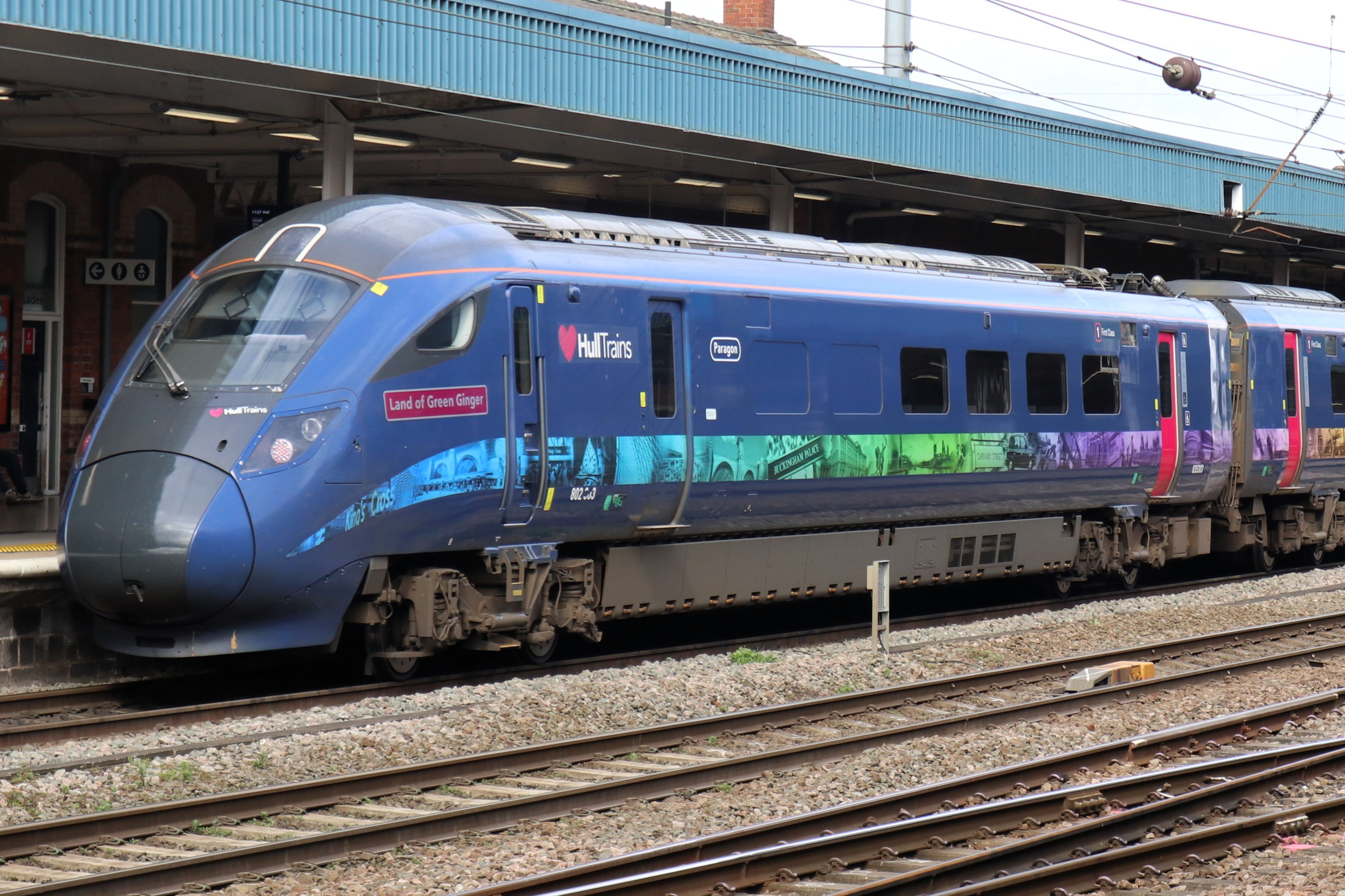
Hull Trains Class 802 at Doncaster

During November 2016, the open-access operator Hull Trains announced the signing of a £60 million deal to procure five five-car AT300 sets, which it would to replace its existing fleet of Alstom-built Class 180 diesel multiple units on its Hull to London service. The first Class 802 body shell was completed at the Kasado plant in August 2018. During August 2019, the company's drivers commenced training using trains already delivered to TransPennine Express. In the same month, Hull Trains announced that its new train would be known as the Paragon, named after Hull Paragon station.

On 7 November 2019, Hull Trains took delivery of its first Class 802 set (802301). This unit participated in the official launch of the Paragon fleet on 25 November, at which the full livery was unveiled at Hull station. On 5 December 2019, the first Class 802 officially entered service, working the 10:33 Hull to London King's Cross along with the 13:48 return.

Hull Trains have configured their Class 802 units so that coach A contains standard seating with wheelchair accommodation, coach B and coach C are both standard seating, coach D is both standard- and first-class seating and Coach E is completely first-class seating with wheelchair accommodation. As a reported result of customer requests, the Class 802s do not have a cafe bar, unlike their Class 180 predecessors.

Following the introduction of the Class 802 units, the surplus Class 180 units were transferred in stages to East Midlands Railway to replace EMR's three six-carriage HSTs inherited from Grand Central.

== Fleet details ==
Subclass	Operator	Qty.	Year built	Cars per unit	Unit nos.
802/0 Intercity Express Train	Great Western Railway	22	2017–2018	5	802001–802022
802/1 Intercity Express Train	Great Western Railway	14	2017–2018	9	802101–802114
802/2 Nova 1	TransPennine Express	19	2017–2019	5	802201–802219
802/3 Paragon	Hull Trains	5	2019–2020	5	802301–802305

=== Illustrations ===
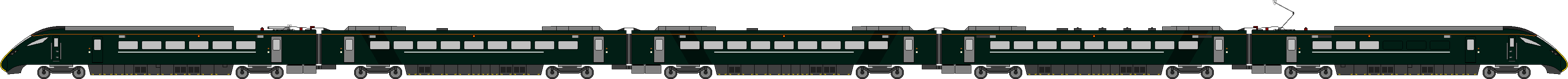
Illustration of a GWR Class 802/0 "Intercity Express Train"
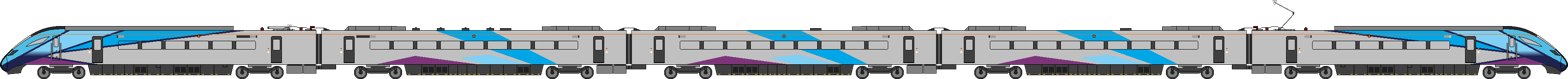
Illustration of a TransPennine Express Class 802/2 Nova 1
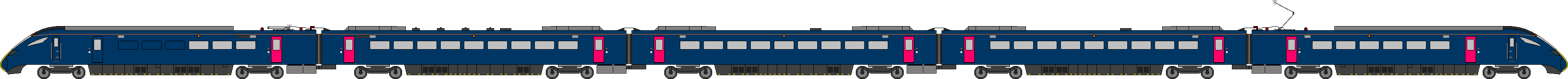
Illustration of a Hull Trains Class 802/3 Paragon

=== Named units ===
==== Great Western Railway ====
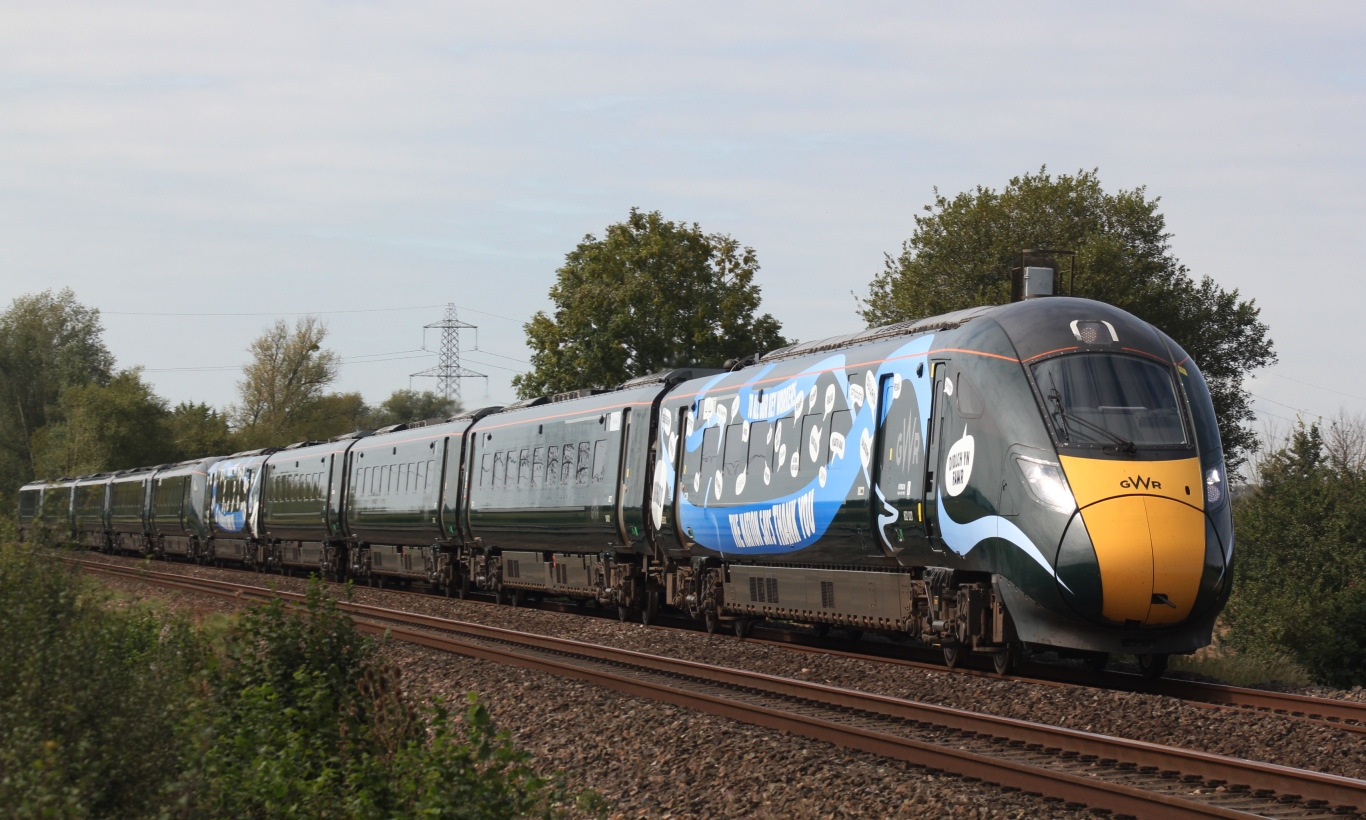
Great Western Railway Class 802 in the special multi-lingual 'Thank You NHS' livery.

Great Western Railway's Intercity Express Trains are being named after "inspirational people" who have influenced the regions that the company serves.

Unit number	Date	Name	Ref.
Named trains
802002	19 October 2020	Steve Whiteway	
802006	2025	Donovan and Jenifer Gardner	
802007	2025	Michael Morpurgo/War Horse Joey	
802008	13 April 2019; 23 May 2024	Rick Rescorla and RNLB Solomon Browne	
802010	19 August 2021	Corporal George Sheard and Kieron Griffon	
802011	8 December 2018	Captain Robert Falcon Scott and Sir Joshua Reynolds	
802013	9 April 2019	Michael Eavis	
802018	18 August 2021	Jeremy Doyle and Donovan & Jenifer Gardner	
802022	???	Cyril Bleasdale OBE FLIT	
802101	28 November 2019	Nancy Astor CH (de-named)	
802103	4 May 2023	Y Carolean Hedegog and Flying Carolean	
802109	17 June 2024	#shaniatrain	
802110	12 September 2023	Dame Agatha Christie	
Special liveries
802020	7 July 2020	NHS Key Workers	

==== Hull Trains ====
Unit number	Date	Name	Ref.
802301	October 2022	Amy Johnson	
802302	28 October 2022	Jean Bishop (The Bee Lady)	
802303		Land of Green Ginger	
802304	October 2022	William Wilberforce	
802305	November 2022	The Humber Bridge	

==== TransPennine Express ====
Unit number	Date	Name	Ref.
Named trains
802208	2023	Diligence/Robert Stephenson & Co	
802209	2026	North Star	
802210	13 December 2023	Hailes Castle	
802212	23 May 2022	St Abb's Head	
802213	22 January 2024	Unity	
802215	4 May 2023	Palace of Holyroodhouse	

== Incidents ==
- During testing of a Class 802, on the evening of 16 October 2018, ahead of its handover to GWR, severe damage was caused to 500 m (1,600 ft) of overhead power lines in the Hanwell area, outside London Paddington station. This damage led to service cancellations and delays that night and the following two days.
- On 22 March 2022, unit 802207 derailed during a scheduled depot move at Heaton Depot. The unit's lead carriage tipped over, and the unit has been at Hitachi's factory in Newton Aycliffe since. It had been repaired by early 2024, but did not immediately re-enter service, as it is being used in a trial involving the fitment of a battery module in place of one of its diesel engines.
