= Platinum Trains =

- Franchise(s): Open access operator
- Main region(s): Edinburgh to Aberdeen; East Coast Main

Platinum Trains was a proposed open access operator that intended to run limited-stop train services from Scotland to London via the East Coast Main Line. Its plan was to compete with air travel.

The company proposed to use two Class 180 units to operate two outbound and return journeys per day on weekdays and one outbound and return per day at weekends between Aberdeen and London King's Cross, calling at Edinburgh and Dundee. The company anticipated placing an order for new rolling stock in the first year of operation with introduction into service in the third or fourth year.

In February 2009, the application to operate trains was denied by the Office of Rail Regulation, along with that of First Harrogate Trains. Difficulties had been highlighted in finding additional paths for the trains to operate in along the busy East Coast Main Line. In a letter from the Department for Transport to the Office of Rail Regulation in January 2009, it was noted that "the Platinum Trains proposal does not appear to be compatible with Transport Scotland’s franchised service specification between Aberdeen and Edinburgh, and we find it difficult to see how a non-stop path could be achieved south of Edinburgh without use of excessive pathing time which could present operational difficulties due to persistent early running."
