= Renaissance Trains =

Rail transport company in the UK

Renaissance Trains is a company formed in August 1997 by former British Rail managers Mike Jones and John Nelson with the purpose of promoting and investing in open access passenger and freight rail businesses in the United Kingdom, as well as promoting and investing in rail industry innovation. Mary Bonar and Peter Wilkinson are also shareholders. It is based in York.

== Previous operations ==
=== Hull Trains ===
- Hull Trains – operates trains between Hull/Beverley and London King's Cross. Hull Trains was formed in 2000 with GB Railways having an 80% shareholding and Mike Jones & John Nelson 10% each. FirstGroup purchased GB Railways' share in August 2003. The remaining 20% was bought by First in 2014, and there is no longer direct Renaissance Trains involvement.

=== Wrexham & Shropshire ===
- Wrexham & Shropshire – operated trains between Wrexham and London Marylebone from April 2008. It was a joint venture between Renaissance (36%), Arriva UK Trains (50%) and John Laing (14%). Operations ceased in January 2011 with a review of the business determining it unlikely to ever be profitable.

== Proposed operations ==
=== Humber Coast & City Railway ===
The success of Hull Trains and its services from Hull to London led Renaissance Trains to start developing a proposal in 2003 to run trains from South Humberside and Lincolnshire to London To minimise revenue abstraction from franchised operators and avoid the congested East Coast Main Line, it proposed to operate via the joint line to Peterborough, across to Ely and then via the West Anglia Main Line to Stratford commencing in 2008/09.

This service would have taken more than three hours from Lincoln to London, whereas by changing at Newark North Gate the journey would usually take no more than 2 hours. In addition, Lincoln was being served by a daily service to London St Pancras via Nottingham by East Midlands Trains, and East Coast began running a daily direct train between Lincoln and London King's Cross. Both St Pancras and King's Cross were more central than Stratford and provided links to Eurostar, but with the Stratford City development opening in 2011 and Stratford is nearer to Docklands. An update to the website in 2009 saw all details of the proposal removed, implying that it was no longer being pursued.

=== Glasgow Trains ===
- Glasgow Trains – proposed a daily service from Glasgow to Nottingham and Liverpool Lime Street with stops at Carlisle and Preston.

During the development of the business case, it was determined that operating the Nottingham services via the Settle & Carlisle and Leeds was a more viable alternative. It was proposed to divert the weekend Liverpool services to Blackpool.

The Glasgow Trains proposal was put on hold in November 2005 to allow new franchises to be settled and their needs (in terms of train paths) identified. By September 2007 plans had progressed far enough for Renaissance Trains to begin train and operations planning in preparation for lodging an application for access rights with the Office of Rail Regulation.

The proposal did not appear to proceed any further, with no evidence of an application having been lodged with the Office of Rail Regulation until in 2014, the Renaissance Trains website was updated to say that the project had been revived.

== Rejected proposals ==
=== First Harrogate Trains ===
- First Harrogate Trains – proposed a four times daily service from Harrogate to London King's Cross via York and the East Coast Main Line from summer 2009.

The application was denied by the Office of Rail Regulation in a preliminary report released in January 2009, and in a final decision in February 2009.
