= Glasgow Trains =

- Franchise: Open access operator
- Parent company: Renaissance Trains

Other
- Website: www.renaissancetrains.com/glasgow-trains

Glasgow Trains was a proposed open access rail operator from Renaissance Trains. The proposal was to operate a twice daily direct service from Glasgow to Liverpool and Nottingham with intermediate stops at Carlisle and Preston.

The concept arose in 2004, when Renaissance Trains entered negotiations with Network Rail for track access rights in order to operate services between the Glasgow, North West England and East Midlands. The initial proposal advocated running one train per day between Glasgow and Preston where the train would divide with separate portions for Liverpool and Nottingham. During the development of the business case, it was determined that running the Nottingham services via the Settle & Carlisle line and Leeds was a more viable alternative. On weekends it was proposed the Liverpool service divert to Blackpool. Glasgow Trains planned to operate 100 mph capable stock.

The Glasgow Trains proposal was put on hold in November 2005 to allow new franchises to be settled and their train paths needs identified. By September 2007, plans had progressed far enough for Renaissance Trains to begin train and operations planning in preparation for lodging an application for access rights with the Office of Rail Regulation.

The investment programme for Glasgow Trains included the building of a new parkway station on the route between Glasgow and Liverpool.

In March 2008 Renaissance Trains stated it was hoping to start Glasgow to Liverpool services in December 2008 having identified three 100 mph paths in each direction on the West Coast Main Line with stops at Carlisle, Oxenholme, Preston and St Helens. It was hoping to receive a timetable offer from Network Rail in July 2008 to allow it to apply for access rights. It was intending to use Class 67s hauling Mark 3 carriages and a Driving Van Trailer. Renaissance Trains hoped to also operate from Glasgow to Nottingham and Leicester from December 2009 but said it was struggling to find paths.

In April 2008 Renaissance Trains stated there was no operational reason why the Liverpool service could not start - it was down to commercial funding being found.

The proposal did not appear to proceed any further, with no evidence of an application having been lodged with the Office of Rail Regulation until in 2014, the Renaissance Trains website was update to say that the project had been revived. It also cited "the slowdown in the national economy from 2008" as the reason why the project had initially been abandoned, due to the inability to "attract investment backing."

The project appears to be defunct as of 2020, with the RenaissanceTrains.com domain expired.
