= British Rail Class 180 =

Diesel multiple unit train

British Rail Class 180 Adelante
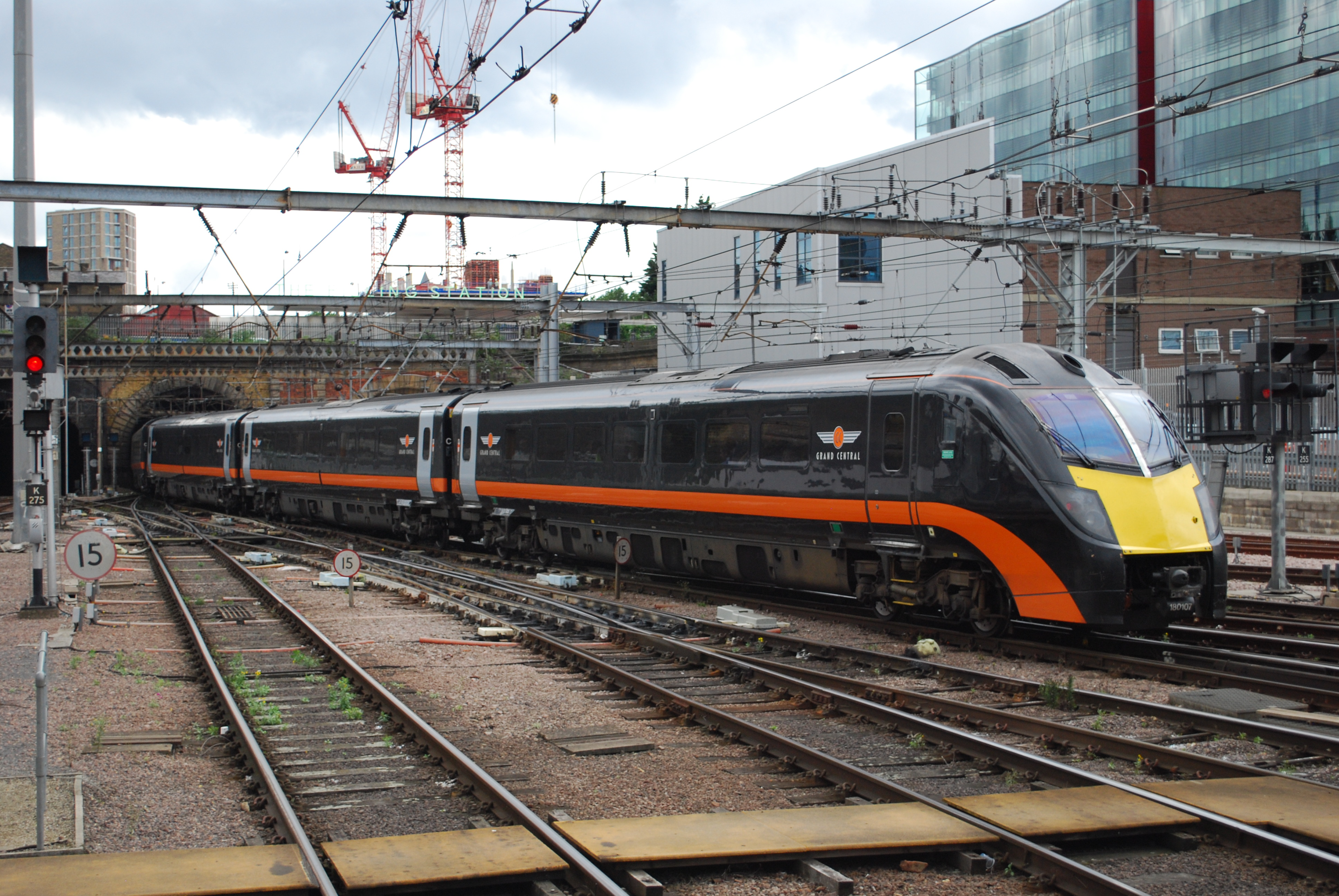
- Grand Central Class 180 leaving London King's Cross in 2012

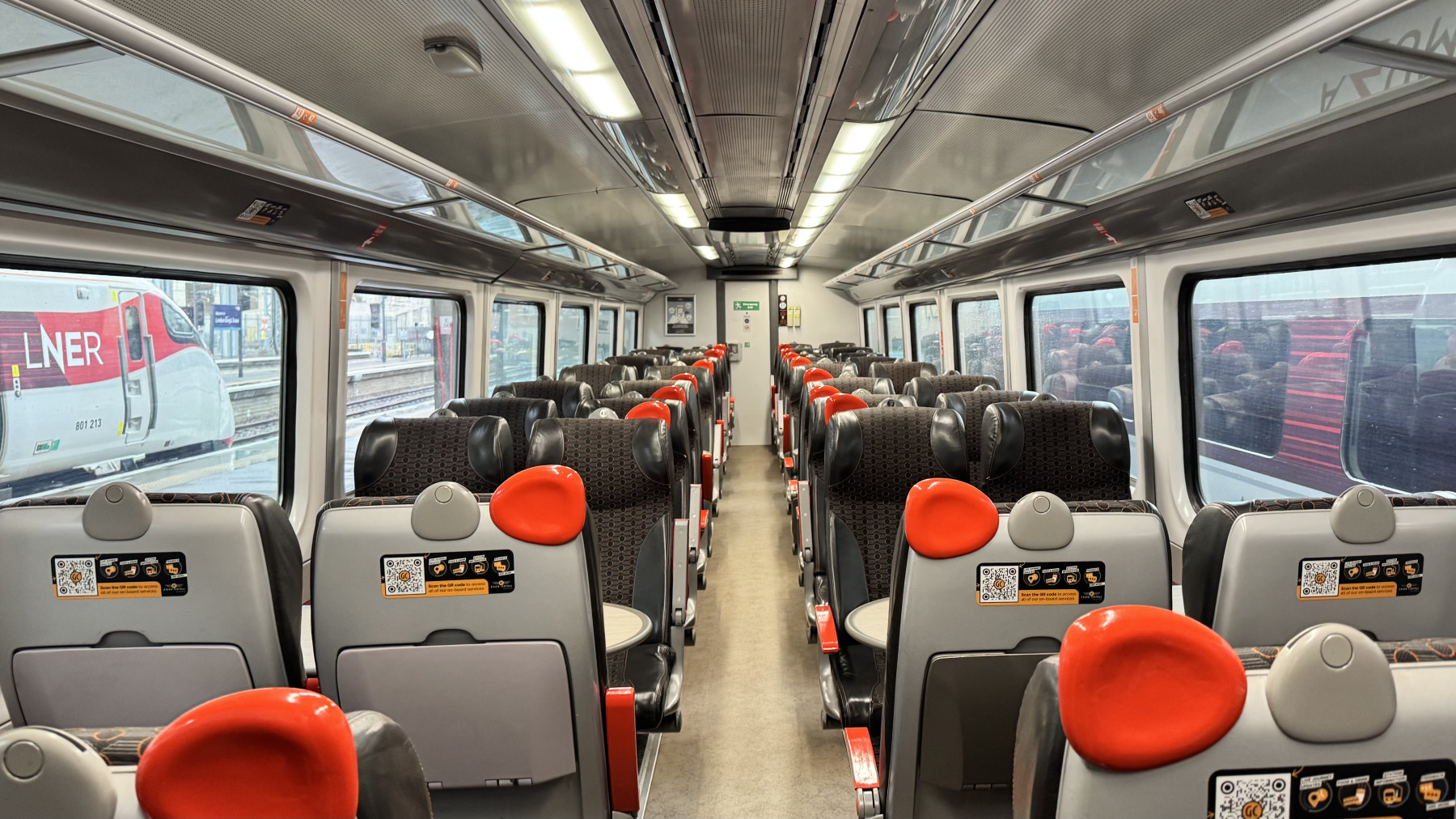
- Refurbished Grand Central Interior
- Stock type: Diesel multiple unit
- In service: December 2001 – present
- Manufacturer: Alstom
- Built at: Washwood Heath
- Family name: Alstom Coradia 1000
- Replaced: InterCity 125; Class 222
- Constructed: 2000–2001
- Number built: 14 sets
- Number in service: 10 sets
- Successor: Class 800 (Great Western Railway); Class 802 (Hull Trains); Class 820 (Grand Central)
- Formation: 5 cars per set: DMSL(A)-MFL-MSL-MSLRB-DMSL(B)
- Fleet numbers: 180101–180114
- Capacity: 287 seats
- Owner: Angel Trains
- Operator: Grand Central
- Depots: Current: Crofton TMD; Former: Derby Etches Park; Old Oak Common; Newton Heath TMD

Specifications
- Car body construction: Steel
- Train length: 116.52 m (382 ft 3 3/8 in)
- Car length: 23.71 or 23.03 m (77 ft 9 1/2 in or 75 ft 6 3/4 in)
- Width: 2.73 m (8 ft 11 1/2 in)
- Maximum speed: 125 mph (200 km/h)
- Weight: 252.5 tonnes (248.5 long tons; 278.3 short tons) (5-car set) Axle load weight 13.25 tonnes
- Prime mover: Cummins QSK19-R (one per car)
- Engine type: Inline-6 turbo-diesel
- Displacement: 19 L (1,159 cu in) per engine
- Power output: 559 kW (750 hp) per engine at 2,100 rpm
- Transmission: Voith T 312 bre hydrokinetic (one per car)
- UIC classification: 2′B′+B′2′+B′2′+B′2′+B′2′
- Bogies: Alstom MB2
- Braking system: Disc/Hydrodynamic (Hydrodynamic brake unused in order to prevent the engines from overheating.)
- Safety systems: AWS; TPWS; ATP; ETCS (Note: ETCS is fitted, but will not be used until ETCS is installed on the East Coast Main Line)
- Coupling system: Scharfenberg Type 330
- Multiple working: Within type and Class 175
- Track gauge: 4 ft 8 1/2 in (1,435 mm) standard gauge

The British Rail Class 180 Adelante is a class of 14 diesel-hydraulic multiple unit passenger trains manufactured by Alstom at its Washwood Heath factory in 2000–01 for First Great Western (FGW). They are part of the Coradia 1000 family, along with the Class 175.

All Class 180s are owned by Angel Trains. Operations of the fleet commenced with FGW during December 2001, being tasked with express commuter services that used its 125 mph (200 km/h) capability. However, the type suffered frequent service disruption due to recurring technical problems, particularly in regards to its hydraulic transmission system. FGW ultimately decided to return all of its Class 180s to the lessor in favour of refurbished InterCity 125 sets; the last train leaving its service in 2009. The Class 180s were held in storage for a time before new operators were secured.

During 2008, Hull Trains replaced its Class 222 fleet with several of the Class 180 sets; it operated the type through to 2020 until its replacement by Class 802 sets. Starting in 2009, Grand Central also leased several Class 180s; it operated the type exclusively until November 2023 when it introduced Class 221s onto some services. Five Class 180 sets also returned to service with FGW; the operator's first refurbished unit was introduced on 28 May 2012. These five sets have since been transferred to Grand Central.

The four units formerly used by Hull Trains were transferred to East Midlands Railway, the first entering service in January 2020; these four units were withdrawn by East Midlands Railway in May 2023. Several proposed operators, such as First Harrogate Trains and Platinum Trains, also envisioned operating Class 180s; however, their track access applications were rejected by the Office of Road and Rail (ORR).

== Background ==
As a part of its agreement to operate the Greater Western franchise, First Great Western (FGW) was required to increase the frequency of its express service from London Paddington to Cardiff to half-hourly. In order to do this, the operator required additional rolling stock suitable for high-speed long distance services. In October 1997, FGW ordered fourteen five-carriage Alstom Coradia diesel multiple-units (DMU) from Alstom; these were broadly similar to the Class 175s that were then under construction for sister company First North Western, the most noticeable difference being the ability to reach speeds of up to 125 mph (200 km/h).

On 18 April 2000, the first unit was publicly unveiled. Due to late-stage difficulties encountered, the commencement of full main-line testing was postponed until December 2000. Despite this six-month schedule slippage, Alstom openly claimed that the trains would be capable of entering service in time for the May 2001 timetable change. The first entered regular service in December 2001. Due to their delayed entry into service, in May 2001 FGW was forced to introduce Class 47 hauled Mark 2 sets on London Paddington to Penzance services to release InterCity 125 sets for additional Cardiff services.

== Description ==
There are 14 Class 180 sets, numbered 180101-180114. There are five cars per unit: two Standard Class Driving Motors, two Standard Class Intermediate Motors and a First Class Intermediate Motor. All coaches are equipped with a Cummins QSK19 diesel engine, which develops 560 kW (750 hp) at 2,100 rpm.

The trains feature a hydraulic transmission supplied by Voith, which is a three-speed type, with integral hydrodynamic braking (rated at 750 kW short term, 420 kW continuous). One bogie per coach is powered, with both axles driven. Total vehicle weight is 278 tonnes. The units feature Scharfenberg couplers.

== Operations ==
=== Current operators ===
==== Grand Central ====
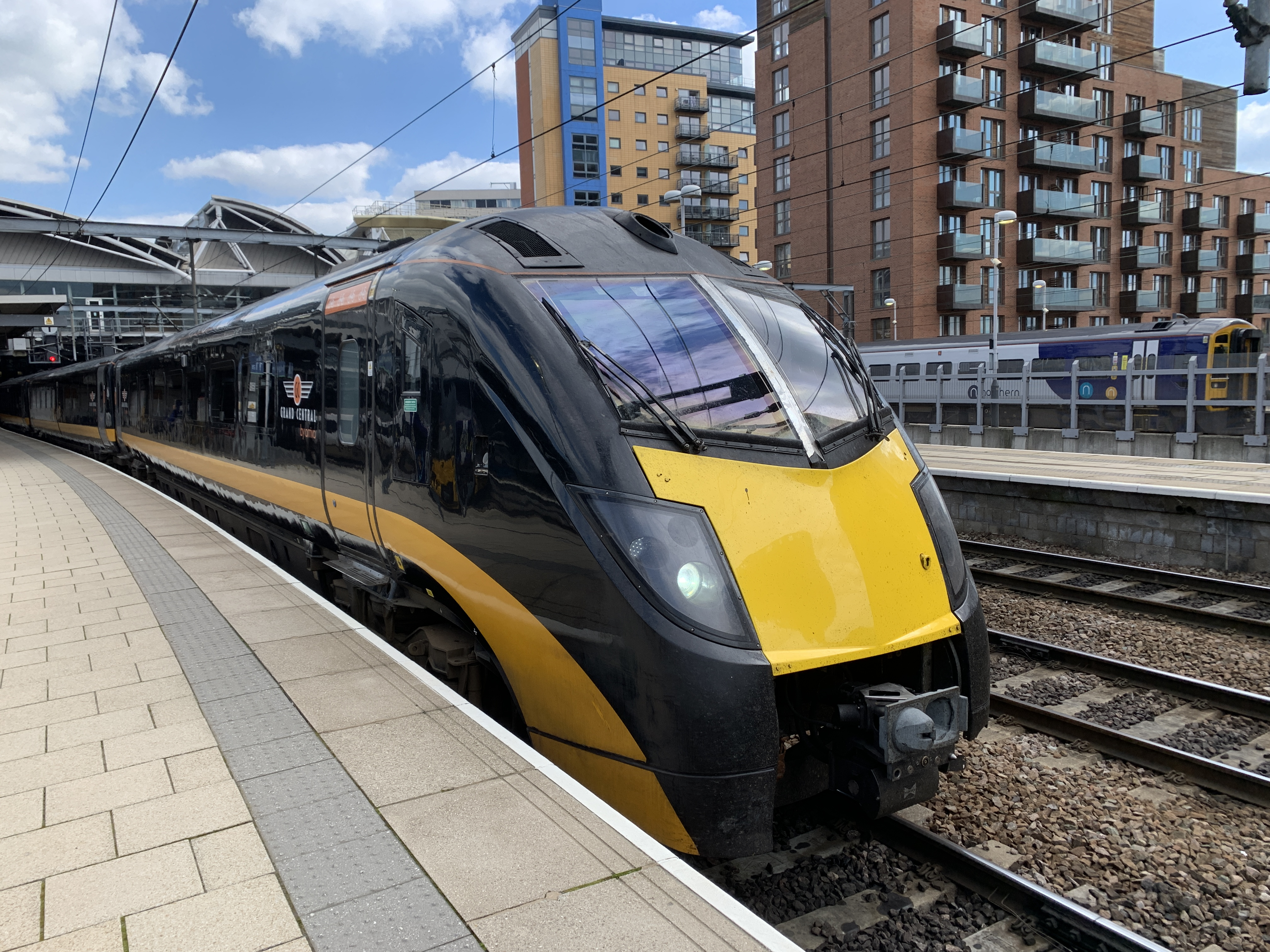
Grand Central Class 180 at Leeds in 2020

Grand Central initially planned to operate a pair of Class 180s on its London King's Cross to Sunderland service, having secured the rights to a fourth daily service in each direction. During early 2009, a pair of Class 180s started being operated by the company in conjunction with its three High Speed Trains (HSTs). Grand Central had initially announced that the two units would run as a ten-car train; it subsequently stated that they would be run separately for greater flexibility. Grand Central initially gave its Class 180s the fleet name Zephyr; the established Adelante name was later re-introduced. Maintenance is carried out at Crofton TMD.

During 2010, Grand Central commenced the lease of an additional three Class 180 units for the launch of its new services to Bradford Interchange. Originally, the service was intended to be operated under the brand name Grand Northern, as part of the parent company Grand Union; in practice, it has been operated as Grand Central so that units can be interchanged between the two routes.

Prior to entering service with Grand Central, the fleet was subject to modification work undertaken by Railcare, during which it was outfitted with Wi-Fi and at-seat sockets, amongst other changes to the amenities. In August 2011, one of the initial two units, 180112, was named James Herriot at a ceremony held at London King's Cross; it was also the first train to carry Grand Central's new logo and orange stripe livery. The units entered revenue service in September 2009, while the Bradford service was launched on 23 May 2010.

Other sets also received individual names. During October 2010, 180107 was named Hart of the North as a result of a public competition conducted through the Hartlepool Mail, while 180105 became as The Yorkshire Artist by the artist Ashley Jackson in October 2011, and 180108 was named William Shakespeare during April 2018.

From July 2016, the train operator Arriva Rail North operated a peak morning working between Halifax and Leeds via Bradford, which was worked using a single Class 180 set that was subleased from Grand Central. This arrangement released other DMUs to cover the reduction in the number of units available to hire from TransPennine Express.

During 2017, Grand Central received the remaining five Class 180s that had been previously operated by First Great Western. Their arrival permitted not only the replacement of the company's HST fleet but also the expansion of its services. In 2018, a refurbishment programme for all 10 of Grand Central's sets commenced at Arriva TrainCare, Eastleigh.

In August 2023 Grand Central leased two of the sets which had been withdrawn by East Midlands Railway in May that same year.

Grand Central will replace its Class 180 fleet with new Class 820 Tri-Mode trains.

=== Former operators ===
==== First Great Western ====
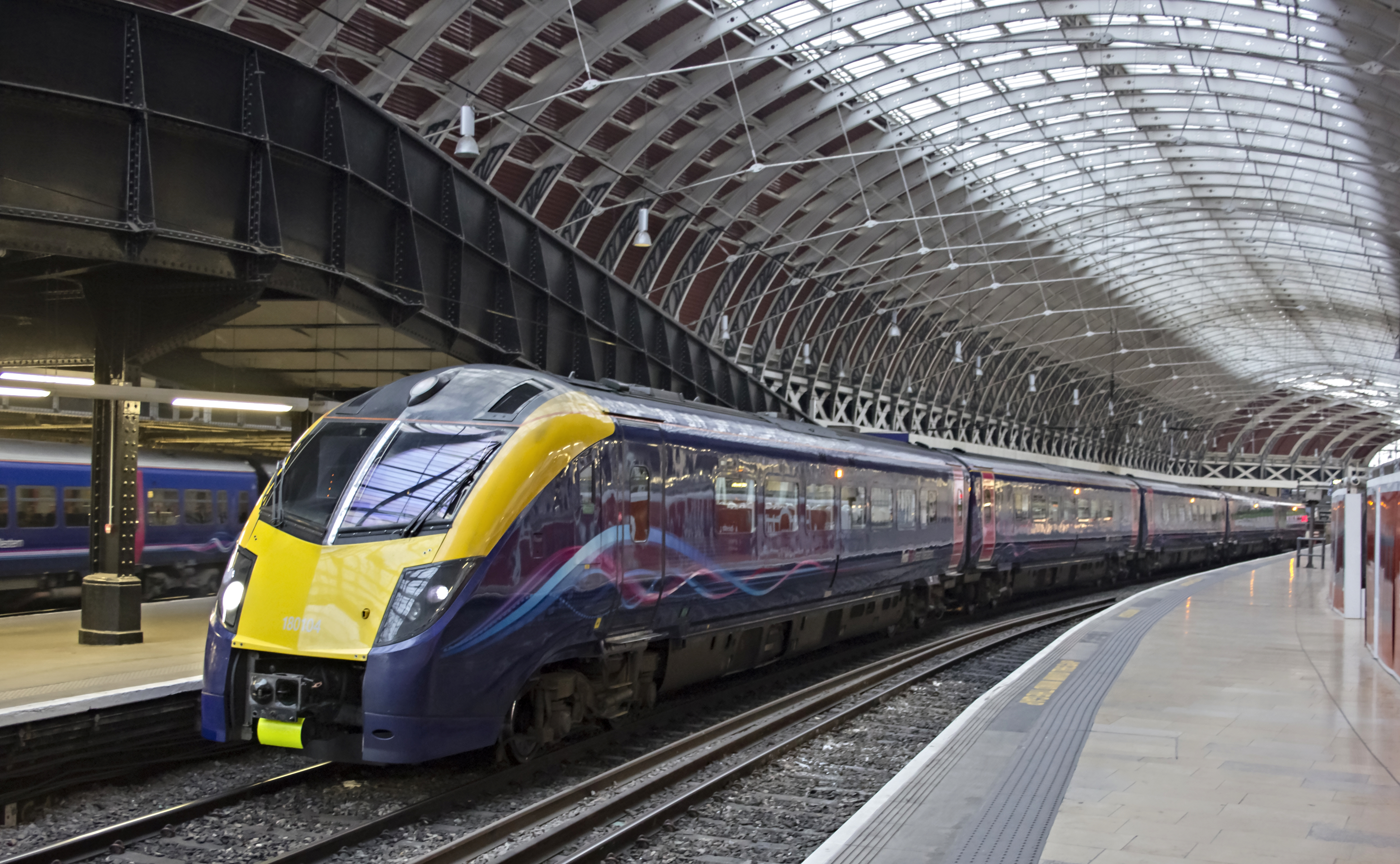
First Great Western Class 180 at London Paddington in 2016

The Class 180 fleet was first operated by First Great Western which gave the type the brand name Adelante. They were originally deployed on services from London Paddington to Bristol Temple Meads via Bath Spa and Cardiff Central via Bristol Parkway. On occasion, units were also operated to Paignton.

While operated by FGW, the Class 180 suffered from numerous technical problems, including instances of the doors closing and locking quickly. These difficulties were persistent enough that the train operator decided to begin the early replacement of the Class 180 on the majority of its services, instead opting for considerably older HSTs that had been formerly operated by Midland Mainline before their replacement by Class 222s. FGW later re-leased five Class 180s for operating express commuter services from London Paddington to Oxford, Worcester, Hereford and Gloucester.

A combination of factors, not only the reliability problems experienced but also increasing passenger numbers, reportedly led to FGW deciding to acquire additional refurbished HST sets towards the end of 2007, which became the replacement for Class 180s on the express commuter services. Between 2007 and 2009, the majority of the fleet was returned to the leasing company Angel Trains.

Although FGW had planned to return the entire fleet in December 2007, it decided to retain three units until the operator took delivery of a cascaded HST from National Express East Coast. A pair of the units operated in multiple on an early-morning Oxford to London commuter service, before being divided to work independently the rest of the day (after returning as empty stock to Oxford) on the Cotswold Line from Paddington to Worcester and Hereford. On 30 March 2009, FGW's final Class 180 service was operated. The remainder were placed in store from December 2007 at Oxley TRSMD.

During 2009, five Class 180 units (102-104, 106 and 108) were leased by East Coast; they were intended to be operated on new services, however these were abandoned. Thus, all five were returned to FGW, where they were used to increase capacity on Thames Valley services, while three units were operated by Northern Rail in the interim. The Class 180s were subsequently re-introduced on the Cotswold Line, which released Class 165 and 166 Turbo DMUs for use on Thames Valley services.

On 28 May 2012, the first refurbished Class 180 commenced passenger service. GWR's Class 180s were maintained at Old Oak Common TMD. During the late 2010s, the type was replaced by new-build Class 800; accordingly, all five units were transferred to Grand Central in 2017.

==== Northern Rail ====
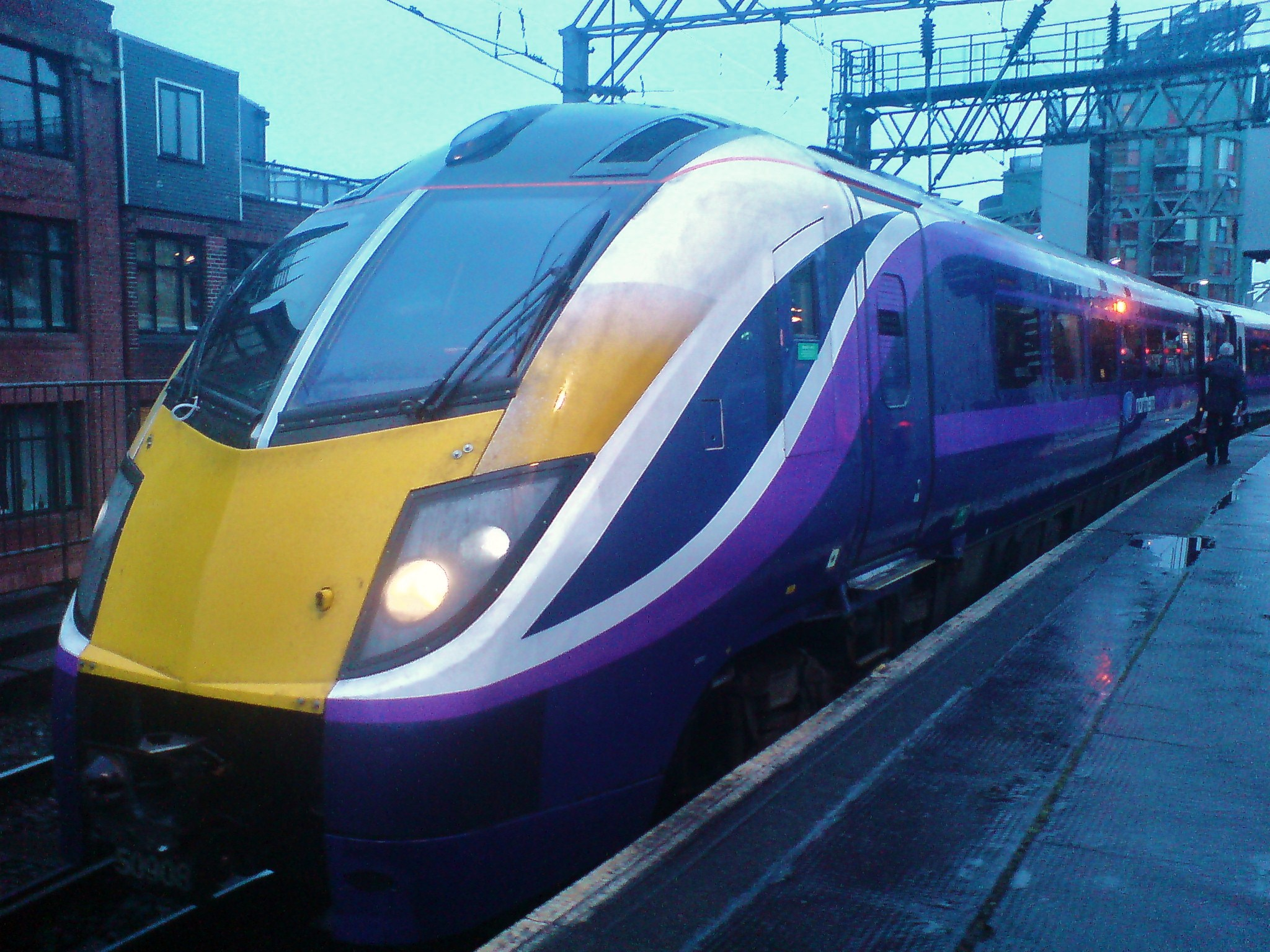
Northern Rail Adelante at Manchester Oxford Road station in 2009

During the mid-2000s, Northern Rail leased three Class 180 units (103, 106 and 108); these sets entered service in December 2008. They were operated from Hazel Grove and Manchester Victoria to Preston and Blackpool North, prior to the end of 2012. These Class 180s were sub-leased from East Coast until the operator could obtain additional long-term rolling stock. The three units were to have transferred to East Coast after the 18-month contract finished in November 2010. However, East Coast changed its plans and no longer required them, so they remained with Northern Rail until December 2011, at which point Northern Rail took delivery of Class 150s formerly used by London Midland. The last of Northern Rail's Class 180s was withdrawn on 2 December 2011. Following their refurbishment, all three units returned to service with First Great Western.

==== Hull Trains ====
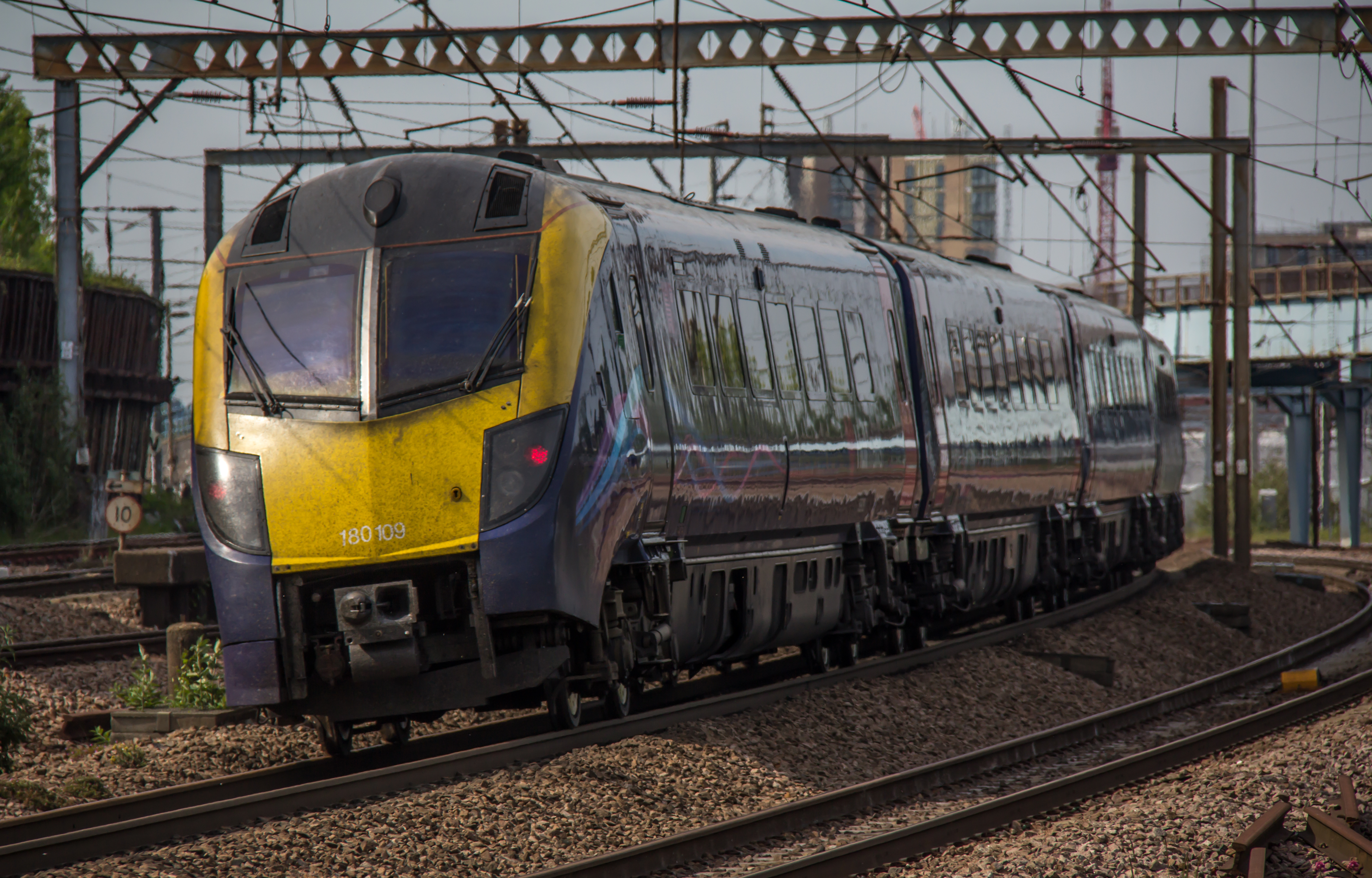
Hull Trains Class 180 at Harringay in 2019

During 2008, Hull Trains arranged for the lease of two Class 180 units to replace a damaged Class 222; these were initially operated alongside the remaining Class 222s between London King's Cross and Hull. Later that year, Hull Trains opted to release its Class 222s to East Midlands Trains and replace them with additional Class 180s. The acquired units underwent an internal refit, which included the installation of laptop sockets and new coffee machines; this refurbishment programme was completed in early 2012.

In January 2009, the first of Hull Trains' Class 180 units entered service. The type provided more capacity than the operator's prior rolling stock, having an additional carriage. However, around their introduction, the Class 180 units were plagued by technical difficulties, and a period of poor reliability for the company followed. However, their reliability since their introduction has improved considerably. Hull Trains opted to refresh their Class 180s, performing a deep clean internally along with the addition of new seat covers and fresh catering facilities for first class passengers, while external work included their repainting into FirstGroup's neon blue livery. Due to the Class 180's reliability problems, a HST set was hired from Great Western Railway in February 2019. In April 2019, Hull Trains introduced another HST for the same purpose.

Prior to 2018, the fleet operated by Hull Trains were maintained alongside the FGW fleet at Old Oak Common TMD in London. After FGW ceased operating Class 180s, the majority of maintenance tasks were transferred to Bombardier Transportation at Crofton TMD. During early 2020, Hull Trains opted to replace its fleet with new-build Class 802s. The former Hull Trains Class 180s were subsequently transferred to East Midlands Railway. The first of East Midlands' Class 180 units entered service during December 2020.

==== Arriva Rail North ====
On 11 July 2016, Arriva Rail North commenced the lease of a single Class 180 from sister Arriva company Grand Central; it ran once per day from Monday to Friday to provide additional peak time capacity on the Calder Valley Line. By the May 2018 timetable, the unit was diagrammed to operate a morning peak service from Hebden Bridge to Leeds, and an evening peak return; both services called at all stations en-route, except for Low Moor.

==== East Midlands Railway ====
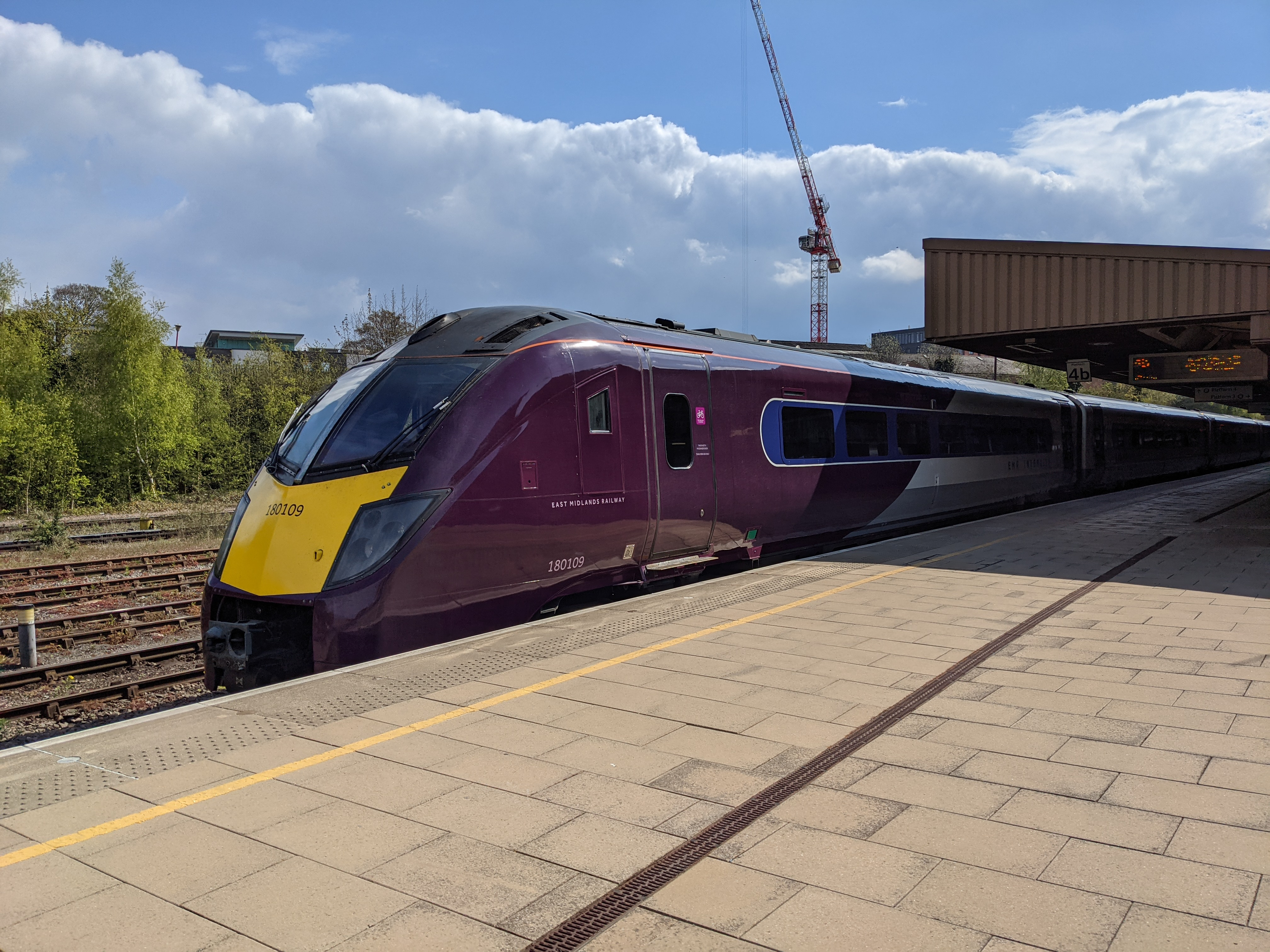
East Midlands Railway Class 180 at Leicester in 2021

As part of its contract to operate the East Midlands franchise, East Midlands Railway announced that it would lease the four units once released by Hull Trains as part of its commitment to replace all its HSTs with more accessible stock. These were operated alongside the Class 222s on EMR's Intercity services between London St Pancras, Sheffield and Nottingham.

In January 2020, the first pair arrived at Derby Etches Park. By August 2020, EMR had received all four of the Class 180s, despite the transfer of the last two units being delayed due to the COVID-19 pandemic, and driver training commenced during the following month.

In September 2020, the first unit, 180111, emerged from Derby Etches Park in EMR livery. On 13 December 2020, all entered service.

In 2021, 180110 was converted to a four-carriage set with carriage 56910 removed due to excessive corrosion. From July until September 2022, Class 180s operated Summer Saturday services from Derby to Skegness.

All were scheduled to be directly replaced by new Class 810 units, but in March 2023 it was confirmed that EMR's Class 180 fleet would be withdrawn at the May 2023 timetable change even though the first Class 810 are not expected to enter service until 2024.

East Midlands Railway withdrew its Class 180 fleet in May 2023.

=== Aborted proposals ===
==== East Coast ====
In March 2008, National Express East Coast (NXEC) requested additional services to a number of destinations in its application for access rights on the East Coast Main Line, stating that, in addition to its existing InterCity 125 and InterCity 225 sets, it would require as many as nine Class 180 units. The routes proposed were London to Lincoln (with one train per day extended to Cleethorpes) and London to Harrogate via York. Following NXEC's demise, successor East Coast decided to press ahead with the plans with three Class 180s temporarily sub-leased to Northern Rail. However, the planned services were never introduced.

==== First Harrogate Trains ====
During the late 2000s, First Harrogate Trains proposed to operate services from London King's Cross to Harrogate with Class 180s. The company's track access application was rejected by the Office of Rail Regulation as the proposed route was deemed to largely duplicate those already provisioned by NXEC, leading to economic concerns.

==== Platinum Trains ====
In the late 2000s, Platinum Trains had planned to use Class 180 units on an Aberdeen to London King's Cross service. The company's track access application was rejected by the Office of Rail Regulation, primarily due to concerns over the ratio of revenue abstraction (from existing operators) to revenue generation (from new travellers), and secondarily that the journey times sought would be difficult to regularly achieve.

==== Virgin Trains ====
During 2008, the train operating company Virgin Trains West Coast leased a pair of Class 180 units from Angel Trains, intending to use them as standby units on the West Coast Main Line following the loss of a Class 390 Pendolino in the Grayrigg derailment. Described as 'strategic standby' units by the company, they were ultimately returned to Angel Trains without ever being used following the decision to use a Class 90 locomotive and Mark 3 coaching stock instead.

== Fleet details ==
Class	Operator	Qty.	Year built	Cars per unit	Unit numbers
180	Grand Central	10	2000–2001	5	180101–180108, 180112, 180114
180	Stored	4	2000–2001	5	180109-180111 180113

=== Named units ===
Some units have received names:

- 180105 Ashley Jackson - The Yorkshire Artist
- 180107 Hart of the North
- 180108 William Shakespeare
- 180112 James Herriot
- 180114 Kirkgate Calling

== See also ==
- List of high speed trains
