= Alstom Coradia 1000 =

Family of diesel multiple units operating in Great Britain

The Coradia 1000 is a type of Diesel Multiple Unit (DMU) operating in Great Britain and which is part of the Alstom Coradia family of diesel and electric multiple units. There are two types that were built, the Class 175 and Class 180.

As of 2025 these DMUs are operated by two different train operating companies. The Class 175 is operated by Great Western Railway and the Class 180 is operated by the train operating company Grand Central.

== Design ==
Both of the Coradia 1000 models utilise a diesel-hydraulic powertrain, with transmissions being supplied by German manufacturer Voith. The diesel engines were supplied by American manufacturer Cummins.

When both classes were new, they featured hydrodynamic retarders as part of their braking equipment. However, due to the unreliability of this equipment on both the Class 175 and Class 180, they were bypassed with the DMUs now just using their normal air brakes.

The Class 175 and Class 180 are capable of working in a multiple unit arrangement with each other, however they cannot work with other classes.

== Operators ==
=== Class 175 ===
==== Current ====
- Great Western Railway

==== Former ====
- Arriva Trains Wales
- First North Western
- First TransPennine Express
- KeolisAmey Wales
- Transport for Wales Rail
- Wales and Borders

=== Class 180 ===
==== Current ====
- Grand Central

==== Former ====
- Arriva Rail North
- East Midlands Railway
- First Great Western
- Hull Trains
- Northern Rail

== Gallery ==
Current Coradia 1000 operators
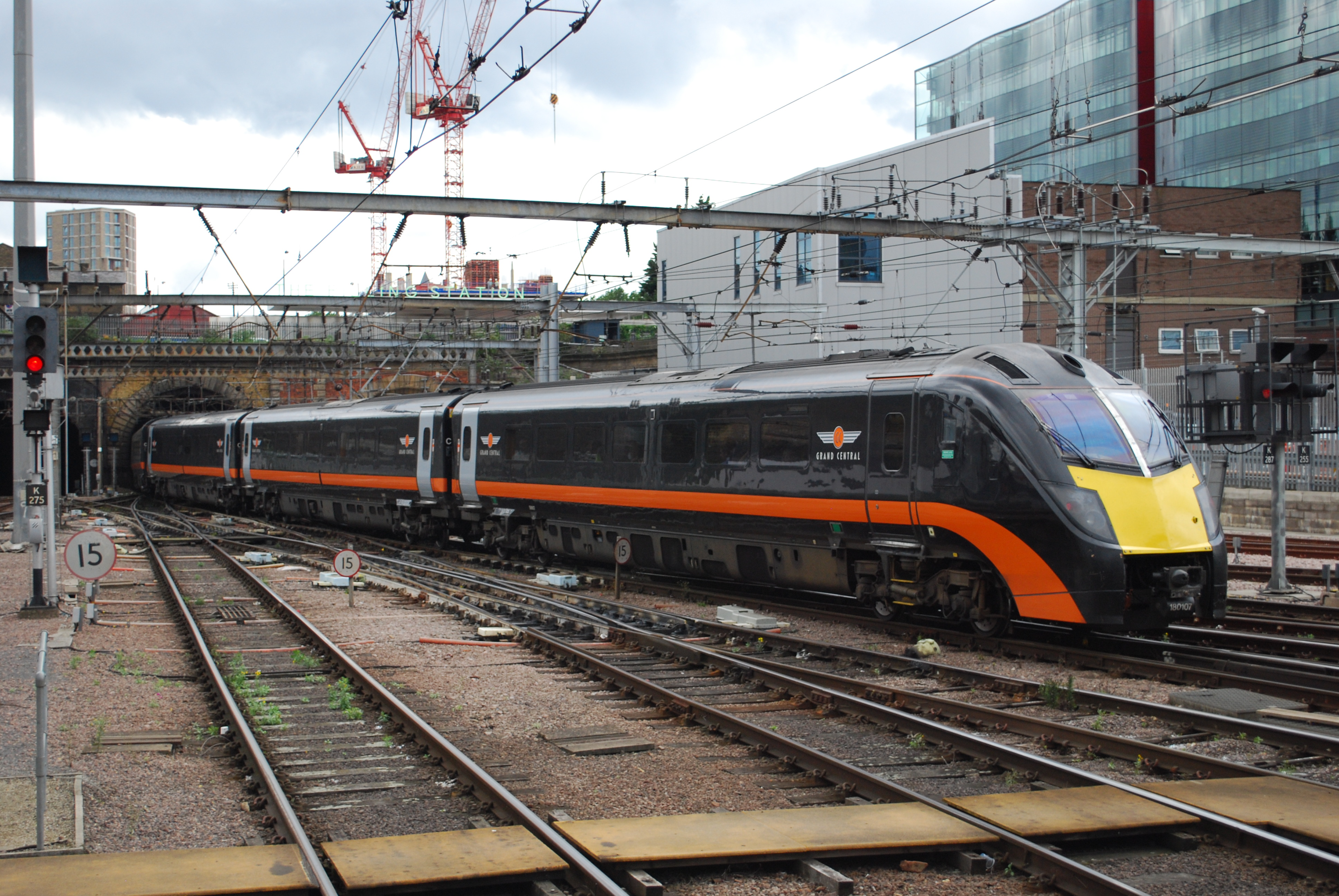
Grand Central 180107 approaching London King's Cross in 2012

== Sources ==
- Marsden, Colin J. (2011). Traction Recognition (2nd ed.). Ian Allan. ISBN 9780711034945. OCLC 751525080.
