= Crofton TMD =

Railway maintenance depot in Crofton, West Yorkshire

Crofton Bombardier Services Site
- Interactive map of Crofton Bombardier Services Site

Location
- Location: Crofton, West Yorkshire
- Coordinates: 53.6665°N 1.4443°W

Characteristics
- Owner: Alstom
- Operator: Alstom
- Depot code: XW
- Type: DEMU, DMU
- Roads: 2-road shed, 5 sidings
- Rolling stock: Current; British Rail Class 170; British Rail Class 180; British Rail Class 185; British Rail Class 220; British Rail Class 221

History
- Opened: 2001
- Former depot code: CX

Crofton Depot is a traction maintenance depot located in Crofton, West Yorkshire, England. The depot is situated on the Wakefield Line and Pontefract Line at the eastern end of Crofton Junction and is located near the now demolished Crofton railway station. It maintains Class 170 Turbostars for Northern Trains; CrossCountry, Grand Central and TransPennine Express store trains overnight for early morning services at the depot.

== History ==
The depot was opened in 2001 by Bombardier Transportation. The depot was upgraded in 2006 and has a 2-road shed and various external sidings with carriage washer and fuelling/CET point. It was used for maintaining Class 170s for TransPennine Express. This has since ceased. The Depot is also a servicing facility for CrossCountry Trains Yorkshire operations (Leeds, Sheffield and York terminating trains) and Grand Central Yorkshire operations (Bradford terminating trains). Hull Trains used the Depot for servicing their Class 180 when maintenance transferred from Old Oak Common Depot.

An additional siding was added to the depot in early/mid 2018 to increase depot stabling capacity resulting from timetable changes. The depot is now owned by Alstom after they bought out Bombardier Transportation.

== Allocation ==
As of 2023, the depot has an allocation of Class 170 Turbostars for Northern Trains. However, Class 220 and Class 221 Voyagers as well as Class 180 Adelantes and Class 185s visit the depot for servicing.
