= Hull Trains =

British open-access train company

- Hull Trains Class 802 Paragon, 2021

Overview
- Franchises: Open access operator Not subject to franchising 25 September 2000 – December 2032
- Main regions: East Midlands; Greater London; Yorkshire & the Humber
- Other region: East of England
- Fleet: Class 802 Paragon
- Parent company: FirstGroup
- Reporting mark: HT

Other
- Website: www.hulltrains.co.uk
Route map

Hull Trains is a British open-access operator in England owned by the multinational transport company FirstGroup. It operates long-distance passenger services between Hull Paragon / Beverley and London King's Cross. It has a track-access agreement until December 2032.

Hull Trains was originally established in 1999 in the aftermath of the privatisation of British Rail in response to the low volume of trains between Hull and London King's Cross operated by the incumbent franchise InterCity East Coast. Their initial track-access agreement was granted in December 1999, permitting operations to be launched on 25 September 2000. Hull Trains' track-access agreement has been extended multiple times since commencing operations. Ownership was originally divided between an 80 per cent stake held by the train operating company (TOC) GB Railways, while the former British Rail managers Mike Jones and John Nelson held the remainder. A majority stake in the company was acquired by FirstGroup in August 2003, leading to its rebranding as First Hull Trains five years later. FirstGroup made it a wholly owned subsidiary by buying out the other shareholder in the venture during August 2014; that same year, the Hull Trains name was readopted.

Hull Trains initially ran three services per day; in response to passenger numbers, this was progressively expanded to as many as seven services per day by December 2006. In addition to increasing service frequency, the number of cars per train was also raised to boost capacity. Hull Trains initially operated a small fleet of three-car Class 170 Turbostar diesel multiple units (DMUs); six years later, it exchanged these for four-car Class 222 Pioneer DMUs, followed by several five-car Class 180 Adelante DMUs and InterCity 125 HST sets. Early services were limited to a maximum speed of 100 mph (160 km/h), but the introduction of the Class 222 enabled speeds to be raised to 125 mph (201 km/h). As of 2022, Hull Trains' services are operated by a fleet of five Class 802 Paragon bi-mode multiple units (BMUs). In 2020 and 2021, multiple temporary suspensions of service were enacted due to the COVID-19 pandemic. Regular services resumed on 12 April 2021.

== History ==
In 1999, there was only one through train per day each way between Hull Paragon and London King's Cross, GNER's Hull Executive. During May 1999, former British Rail managers Mike Jones and John Nelson lodged an application to operate an open-access service through their Renaissance Trains business. A joint venture was formed with the train operating company (TOC) GB Railways, which took an 80% shareholding, while Jones and Nelson each held a 10% stake in the new entity.

In December 1999, a four-year track-access agreement was granted to Hull Trains by the Office of Rail Regulation. According to rail industry periodical Rail Express, the application had been vigorously resisted by the incumbent train operators, such as West Anglia Great Northern. Furthermore, national infrastructure owner Railtrack had allegedly demonstrated a poor ability in identifying potential paths for the service. In Hull Trains' favour was the support of several prominent figures, including members of parliament, who were keen to support an initiative that would provide Hull with improved transportation.

On 25 September 2000, Hull Trains officially launched its operations with its first service departing King's Cross station. Early passenger numbers were encouraging. However, an early blow to the company came in the form of widespread disruption resulting from the Hatfield rail crash; months of speed limitations and temporary line closures heavily impacted services, albeit softened somewhat by compensation payments for lost income issued by Railtrack.

In its first year of operation, Hull Trains reportedly carried roughly 80,000 passengers. During September 2002, Hull Trains' track-access agreement was extended by ten years.

In August 2003, through the purchase of GB Railways by the British transport conglomerate FirstGroup in exchange for £22 million, the latter business took possession of their majority shareholding in Hull Trains. During 2005, Hull Trains celebrated carrying its one-millionth passenger.

In June 2008, Hull Trains was rebranded as First Hull Trains, as well as adopting FirstGroup's corporate blue, pink and white colours as its livery. During January 2009, the firm's access rights were extended until December 2014, and in February 2010, these rights were further extended until December 2016. That same year, its services comprised 1.25 million seats annually.

In August 2014, FirstGroup purchased the remaining 20% shareholding in the business. In January 2015, the track access agreement was extended until December 2019. That same year, the firm also resumed trading as Hull Trains. During March 2016, First Hull Trains obtained approval for a further 10-year open-access agreement until 2029, allowing it to proceed with ordering five Class 802 electro-diesel multiple-unit trains which had been announced by the operator on 3 September 2015.

In 2017, Hull Trains was named the Best UK Train Operator, having scored a 97% satisfaction rate for its services, according to the National Rail Passenger Survey.

At late March 2020, Hull Trains temporarily suspended all services due to the COVID-19 pandemic. Throughout the pandemic, there was concern that the company would be unable to survive without help from the government. However, Hull Trains was able to resume services on 21 August 2020. In October 2020, a three-year extension on Hull Trains' access rights was granted.

Following the implementation of a second lockdown directed by the British government, Hull Trains announced on 2 November 2020 that it would once again be temporarily suspending all services from 5 November 2020. After the second lockdown ended, Hull Trains resumed service on 3 December 2020 with a limited timetable. Following a third lockdown's implementation, Hull Trains announced on 5 January 2021 that it would be once again temporarily suspending all services from 9 January 2021. Regular services resumed on 12 April 2021.

In August 2021 the track access agreement was extended until December 2032.

== Services ==
As of December 2025, Hull Trains runs the following services:

Hull Trains
Route	tpd	Intermediate stops
London King's Cross to Hull Paragon	5	Stevenage (limited), Grantham, Retford, Doncaster, Selby, Howden, Brough; 4 trains per day on Sundays. Stevenage is served by 1 southbound train on Sundays for set down only
London King's Cross to Beverley	2	Grantham, Retford, Doncaster, Selby, Howden, Brough, Hull Paragon, Cottingham; 1 train per day at weekends and some Bank Holidays. Retford is not called at on first Saturday southbound service.

Hull Trains began operating three services per day on 25 September 2000. In December 2002, a fourth daily service started, followed by a fifth in May 2004, a sixth in May 2005, and a seventh in December 2006.

On 4 February 2015, one service per weekday was extended from Hull Paragon to Beverley in each direction. In December 2015, one service was extended to Beverley at weekends. In May 2019, a further service in each direction was extended from Hull Paragon to Beverley on weekdays.

== Expansion proposals ==
=== 2001: Cleethorpes ===
In September 2001, Hull Trains announced initial proposals for a direct service from Cleethorpes to London King's Cross, calling at Grimsby, Barnetby, Market Rasen, Lincoln, Sleaford, Spalding and Peterborough.

=== 2008: Harrogate and Cleethorpes ===
In 2008, First Hull Trains applied for track access rights to run services between Harrogate and London King's Cross via York under the First Harrogate Trains banner and from Cleethorpes to King's Cross via Lincoln and Spalding. In January 2009, the Office of Rail Regulation released its decisions on the ECML route planning and rejected First Harrogate Trains' application.

=== 2024: Sheffield ===
On 5 January 2024, Hull Trains announced that it had submitted an application for a new service between London King's Cross and Sheffield. The trains would also serve Woodhouse and Worksop. These proposals were rejected by The Office for Rail and Road.

== Rolling stock ==
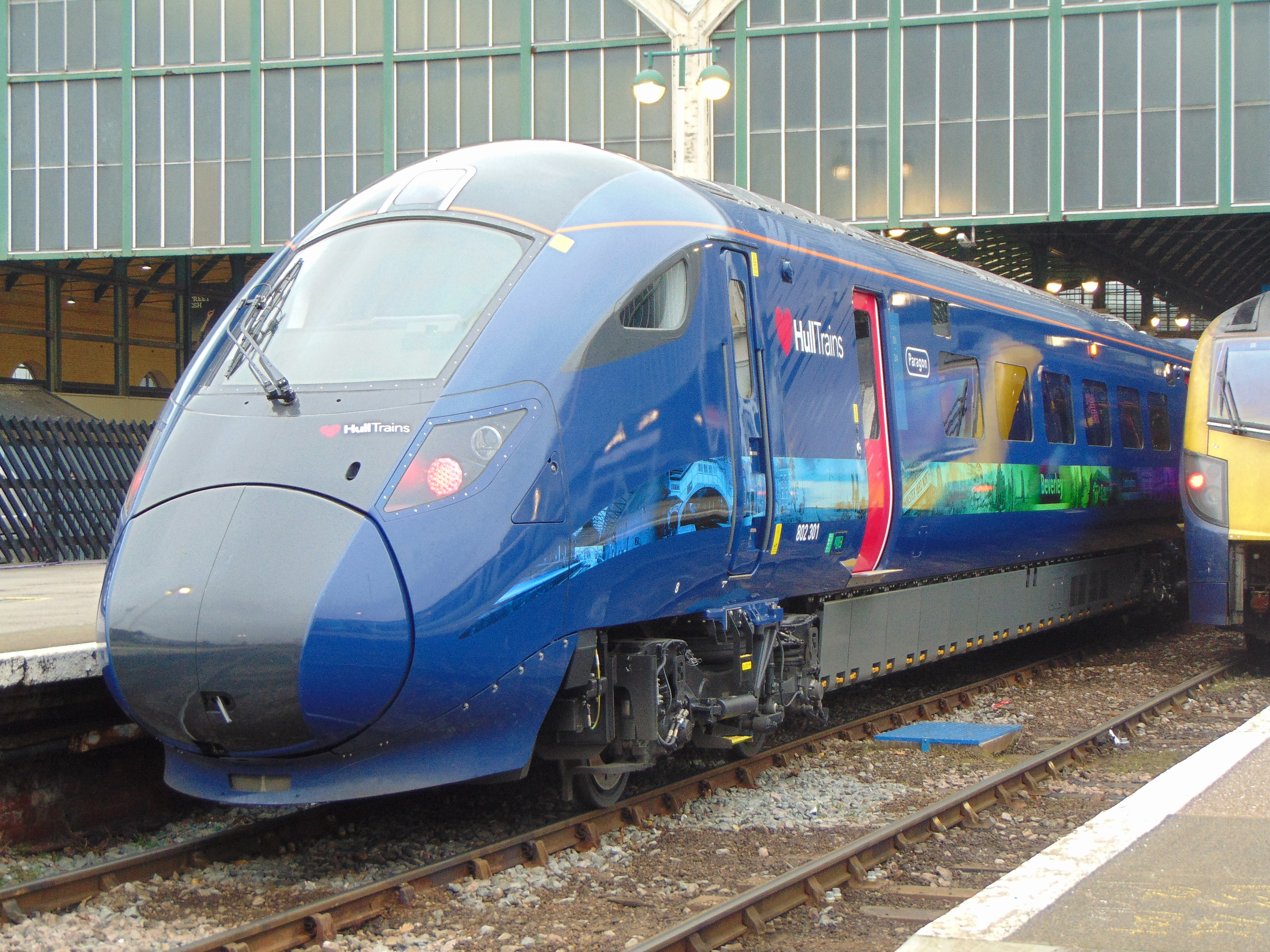
Class 802 Paragon at Hull Paragon

=== Current fleet ===
In September 2015, Hull Trains announced a £60 million order for five new five-car bi-mode high-speed trains from Hitachi Rail with seating for 320 people. In its proposed track access application, Hull Trains confirmed that these would be Class 802. In August 2019, Hull Trains announced that it would branding its new trains as the 'Paragon' fleet. The first unit entered service on 5 December 2019, with the Class 180 fleet not seeing service again following service suspension on 19 March 2020 due to the COVID-19 pandemic.

In the Class 802 units, coach A is standard seating with wheelchair accommodation, coach B and coach C are both standard seating, coach D is both standard- and first-class seating and coach E is completely first-class seating with wheelchair accommodation. The units do not have a cafe bar compared to the Class 180 units they replaced.

Family	Class	Image	Type	Top speed		Qty.	Cars	Routes operated	Built
Family	Class	Image	Type	mph	km/h	Qty.	Cars	Routes operated	Built
Hitachi; AT300	802 Paragon		BMU	125	200	5	5	Beverley / Hull Paragon – London King's Cross	2017–20

The five units are named:*

- Amy Johnson
- Jean Bishop (The Bee Lady)
- Land of Green Ginger
- William Wilberforce
- The Humber Bridge

=== Past fleet ===
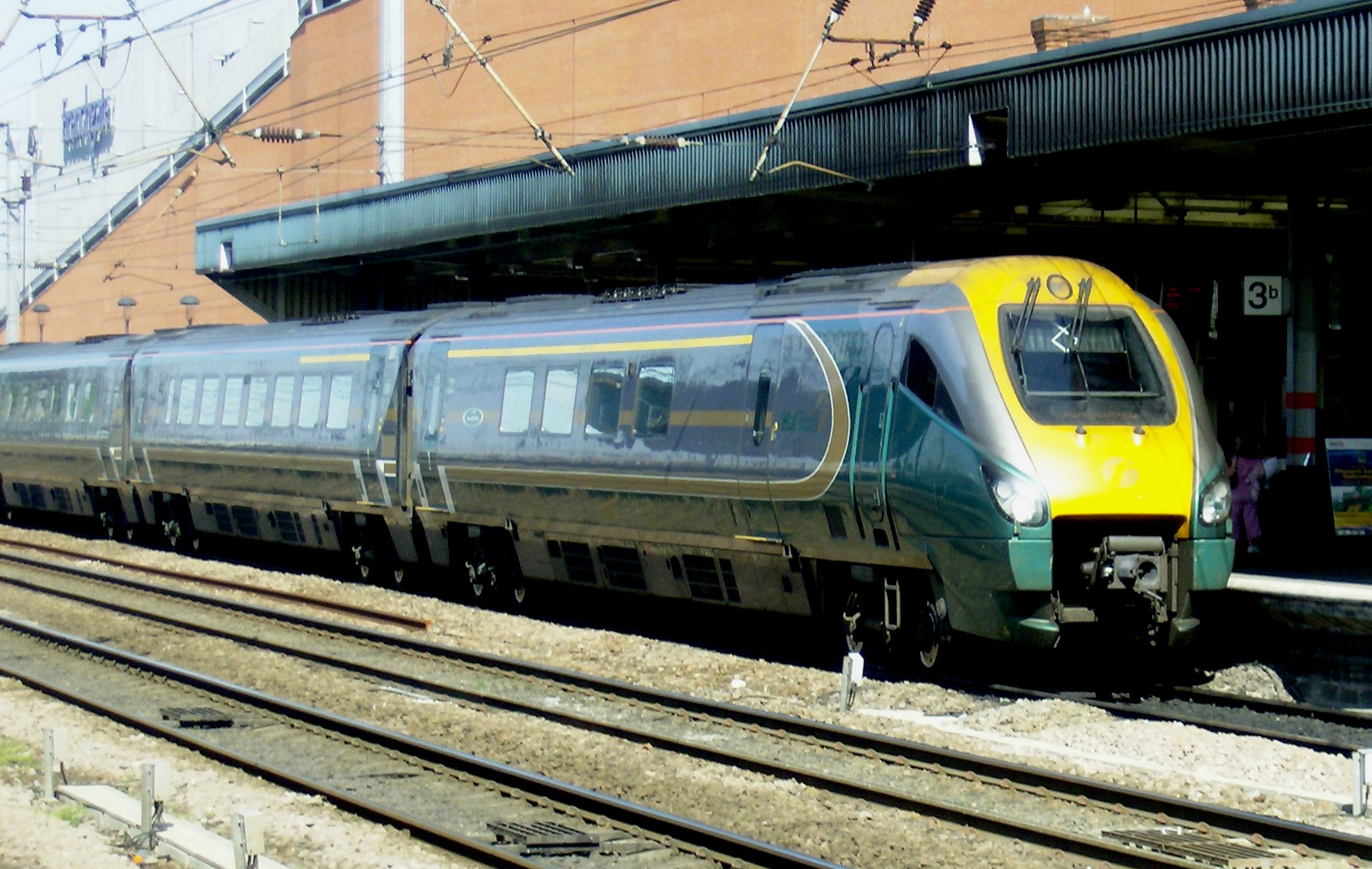
Class 222 Pioneer at Doncaster in 2007

When Hull Trains was initially established, one early obstacle was a shortage of viable rolling stock. Brush Traction was approached with a request to build additional Class 43 power cars, but this proved to be uneconomic due to the need for extensive updates to comply with up-to-date safety legislation; instead, successful negotiations were completed to lease 3-car Class 170 Turbostars from sister GB Railways company Anglia Railways. Hull Trains commenced operations on 25 September 2000 with a fleet of Class 170 trains. There was at least one occurrence of an Anglia Railways Class 86 and Mark 2 set operating as far as Doncaster.

When the Strategic Rail Authority changed its policy on allowing train operating company assets to be hired out, Hull Trains needed to acquire its own fleet. It ordered four 3-car Class 170 Turbostars, the first entering service in March 2004. These were intended only as an interim solution as four 4-car Class 222 Pioneers were ordered at the same time, but because the former were part of a speculative order already placed by Porterbrook they would be available in time.

The Class 170 Turbostars entered service in March 2004. It was planned that after being replaced, they would then be used on new services, but these services were never introduced, so the Class 170 trains were transferred to First ScotRail. The Class 222 Pioneers entered service from May 2005. Their introduction allowed for the maximum speed of Hull Trains' services to be increased from 100 to 125 mph (161 to 201 km/h), both shortening journey times and being more easy to slot around high speed services on the East Coast Main Line.

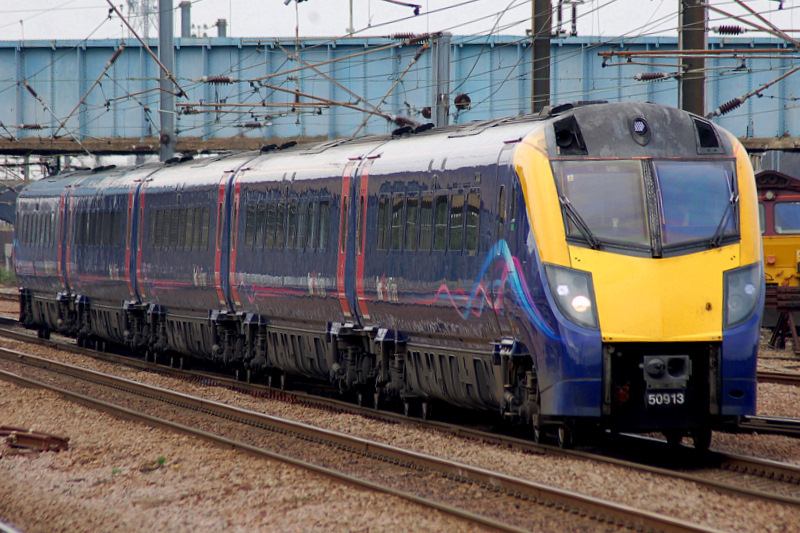
Class 180 Adelante at Peterborough in 2011

During 2006, the number of first class passenger seats on each train was increased from 22 to 33 by reconfiguring their interiors, which included the removal of some standard class seating. In January 2007, a Class 222 Pioneer was damaged when it was dropped off a maintenance jack; it would ultimately take two years to repair. After a period of making do with only three trains, in January 2008 a Class 86 electric locomotive was hired from the AC Locomotive Group to haul a set of Mark 3s hired from Cargo-D for weekend London King's Cross to Doncaster services.

The first set of five-car Class 180 Adelante units entered service with First Hull Trains in April 2008. In total, four sets were introduced releasing the locomotive-hauled fleet and the three Class 222 Pioneer sets. The latter was transferred to East Midlands Trains along with the unit that was damaged.

The Class 180s enabled First Hull Trains to provide more capacity by its additional carriage, but when the units first arrived they were plagued by technical difficulties, and a period of poor reliability for the company followed. However, reliability later improved and the Class 180s were also given a refresh internally with new seat covers and a deep clean. New catering facilities for first class were also provided, and externally the units were repainted in FirstGroup's neon blue livery.

Following further reliability problems with the Class 180s, an InterCity 125 HST set was hired from Great Western Railway in February 2019. In April 2019, Hull Trains introduced another HST set to its network following more reliability problems. Both of these HST sets returned to GWR in December 2019.

Following the introduction of the Class 802 units, the Class 180 units were transferred in stages to East Midlands Railway to replace EMR's three six-carriage HSTs inherited from Grand Central. The first two units transferred to Derby Etches Park in January 2020 after a period in storage at Crofton Depot, and the final two followed in summer 2020.

Family	Class	Image	Built	Number	Withdrawn	Notes
Loco-Hauled Stock
	Class 86		1965–1966	1	2008	Replaced by Class 180 Adelante
	Mark 3		1975–1988	5	2008	Replaced by Class 180 Adelante
	Driving Van Trailer		1988	1	2008	Replaced by Class 180 Adelante
InterCity 125	Class 43		1975–1982	2 sets formed of 5 carriages each	2019	
InterCity 125	Mark 3		1975–1988	2 sets formed of 5 carriages each	2019	
Multiple Unit
Bombardier Turbostar	Class 170		1999–2004	4	2005	Replaced by Class 222 Pioneer
Bombardier Voyager	Class 222 Pioneer		2005	4	2009	Replaced by Class 180 Adelante
Alstom Coradia	Class 180 Adelante		2000–2001	5	2020	Replaced by Class 802 Paragon

== Depots ==
Maintenance of the Class 180 Adelantes was undertaken at Old Oak Common Depot alongside First Great Western's fleet until this depot closed in 2018. Two sets (or occasionally three if there were no sets on maintenance) were stabled and serviced each night in Hull sidings by Hull Trains staff (where there were usually two fitters on at night to undertake basic fault repair and diagnostics) with fuelling and emptying of toilet tanks being undertaken at Arriva Rail North's Botanic Gardens TMD. The third service set was stabled at either Bounds Green or Old Oak Common as service requirements dictated. A day fitter was based at Hull from Bombardier at Crofton TMD.

The Class 802s are maintained by Hitachi at Bounds Green depot with overnight servicing continuing to take place at Northern Trains' Hull Botanic Gardens TMD.
