= First Harrogate Trains =

- Franchise(s): Open access operator
- Main region(s): Harrogate Line; East Coast Main Line
- Parent company: FirstGroup (80%); Renaissance Trains (20%)

Other
- Website: www.harrogatetrains.co.uk

First Harrogate Trains was a proposed open access operator with ambitions to run passenger rail services between Harrogate and London King's Cross via York. The company was a subsidiary of Hull Trains, then owned by FirstGroup (80%) and Renaissance Trains (20%).

The company proposed to run from Harrogate to London King's Cross with up to four services each way per day. The application to run trains was rejected by the Office of Rail Regulation (ORR) in February 2009. It cited that the services would not bring enough new patronage and thus rely on abstracting revenue from existing train operating companies.

First Harrogate Trains also applied to operate four trains per day from Cleethorpes to London Kings Cross, with an additional four between Lincoln Central and London, and to open a new station at Donnington Parkway. In 2009, this application was rejected by the ORR.

Had the proposal been successful, it was intended that services would commence in the summer of 2009.

== Rolling stock ==
The preferred rolling stock to be used was Class 180 Adelante or Class 222 Pioneer trains, the types used by Hull Trains previously.
