= Open-access operator =

Rail company using third-party infrastructure

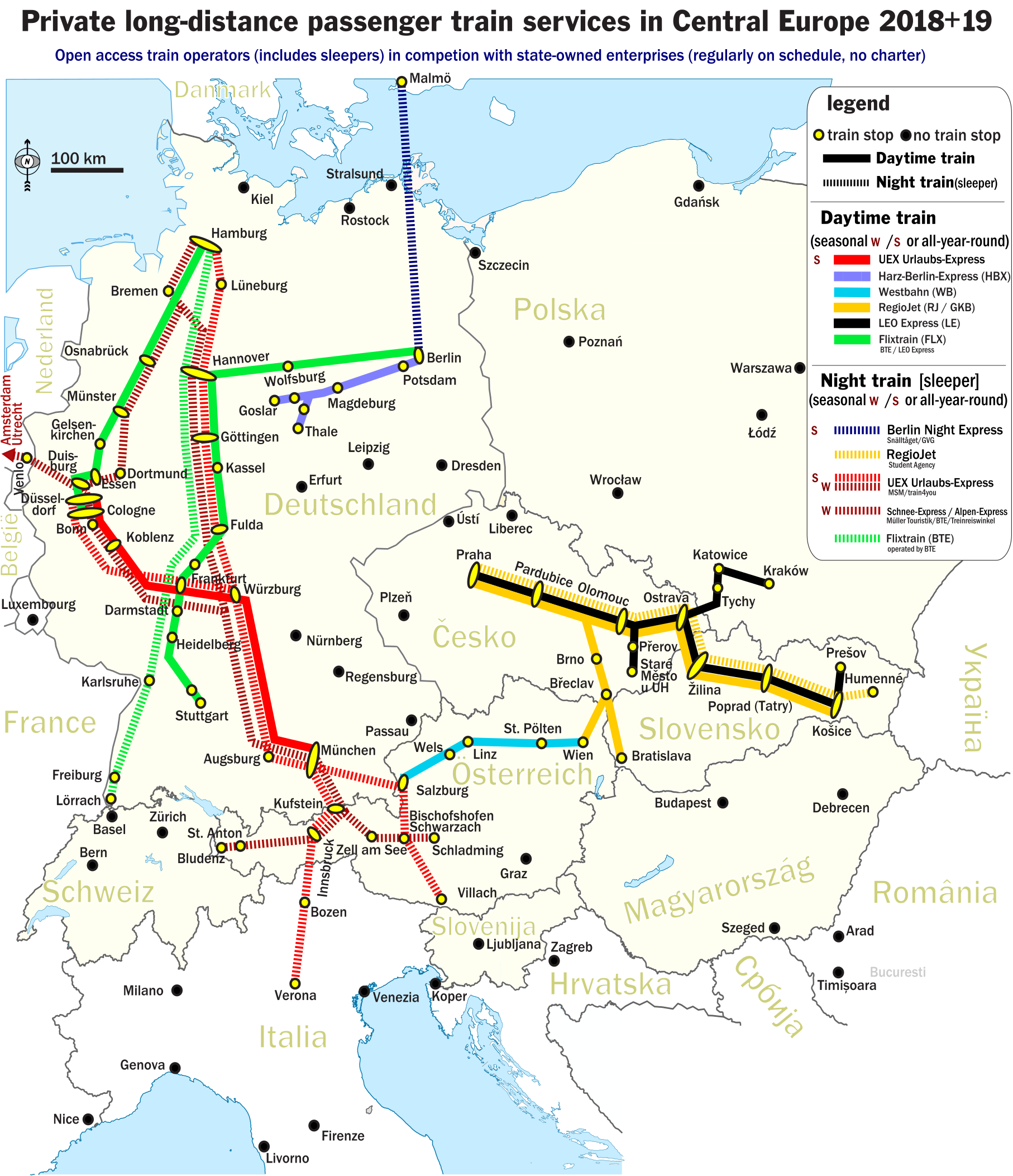
Map of private long-distance passenger rail services in Central Europe 2018-2019

In rail transport, an open-access operator is an operator that takes full commercial risk, running on infrastructure owned by a third party and buying paths on a chosen route and, in countries where rail services run under franchises, are not subject to franchising.

== Passenger open-access operators by country ==
=== Austria ===
- Optima Express Motorail night train from Villach to Edirne
- RegioJet
- Westbahn

==== In development ====
- Silverstar Railways

=== Czech Republic ===
- LEO Express
- RegioJet

=== Belgium ===
- Eurostar
- European Sleeper

=== France ===
- Nightjet (suspended 2025 after end of subsidies)
- Trenitalia France
- Renfe

==== In development ====
- Le Train
- Velvet
- Kevin Speed

=== Germany ===
- Eurostar
- FlixTrain
- Harz-Berlin-Express
- Nightjet
- Westbahn
- European Sleeper

==== In development ====
- NTV (Italo)

==== Former operators ====
- Hamburg-Köln-Express taken over by Flixtrain
- InterConnex
- Locomore Stuttgart-Berlin route taken over by Leo Express, marketing through Flixtrain
- Vogtland-Express

=== Hungary ===
- RegioJet

=== Italy ===
- DB/ÖBB Italia
- Nightjet
- NTV (Italo)
- Arenaways

=== Netherlands ===
- European Sleeper
- Arriva night services
- GoVolta

==== In development ====
- Heuro
- Qbuzz international services

=== Poland ===
- LEO Express
- RegioJet

==== In development ====
- FlixTrain

=== Romania ===
- Astra Trans Carpatic
- Regio Călători
- Softrans
- Transferoviar Grup

=== Slovakia ===
- RegioJet (all services except those on Bratislava — Komárno mainline, which are franchised)

=== Slovenia ===
- Adria transport

=== Spain ===
- Ouigo España
- Iryo

=== Sweden ===
- VR Snabbtåg Sverige (formerly MTRX)
- Snälltåget (Transdev) (Malmö–Stockholm–Åre)
- TÅGAB
- SJ AB (Note: Most services run open-access with the exception of Stockholm - Duved, Stockholm - Hamburg and services run by subsidiaries.)

==== Former operators ====
- Blå Tåget
- Saga Rail
- FlixTrain
- Sydvästen

=== United Kingdom ===
- Eurostar
- Grand Central
- Heathrow Express
- Hull Trains
- Lumo

==== In development ====
- Go-op
- Wrexham, Shropshire & Midlands Railway
- Virgin Trains
- Gemini Trains
- Evolyn
- FS Italiane
- Alliance Rail (Marchwood-Southampton)

==== Former operators ====
- Wrexham & Shropshire (ceased trading January 2011)

==== Former proposals ====
- Alliance Rail Holdings (company dissolved)
- First Harrogate Trains
- Grand Union (purchased by FirstGroup)
- Glasgow Trains
- Platinum Trains
