= 80x =

80x or 80X may refer to:

- 80X, a model of the Beretta Cheetah
- A bus route in Hong Kong
- Any of the Class 80x sets of the Hitachi A-train family in the United Kingdom
  - British Rail Class 800
  - British Rail Class 801
  - British Rail Class 802
  - British Rail Class 803
  - British Rail Class 805
  - British Rail Class 807
  - British Rail Class 810
