= Seaboard =

Seaboard is a synonym for coastline. It can also refer to:

== Places ==
- Seaboard, North Carolina, a small town in the United States
  - Seaboard Historic District
- Seaboard, Virginia, an unincorporated community and coal town in the United States

== Railroads ==
- Seaboard and Roanoke Railroad, 1833
- Seaboard Air Line Railroad, 1900
- Seaboard Coast Line Railroad, 1967
- Seaboard Coast Line Industries, 1969
- Seaboard System Railroad, 1982

== Other uses ==
- Seaboard Corporation, an international agribusiness company
- Seaboard International, an international oilfield equipment engineering and manufacturing company, or its subsidiary Seaboard Wireline
- Seaboard World Airlines (1960 to 1980), an international cargo airline that also served as a U.S. military carrier
- ROLI Seaboard, musical instrument designed and made by ROLI

== See also ==
- Seeboard, a former British electricity company
- Eastern seaboard (disambiguation)
- East Coast (disambiguation)
- West Coast (disambiguation)
