= Evero =

Evero may refer to:

- British Rail Class 805 Evero, a bi-mode multiple unit used for Avanti West Coast that started operation in June 2024
- British Rail Class 807 Evero, an electric multiple unit used for Avanti, that entered service in November 2024
- Ejiro Evero, an American football coach for NFL
