= Hitachi AT300 =

Family of intercity express multiple units

- Top: LNER Class 800; Bottom: Lumo Class 803 and TPE Class 802
- Stock type: Multiple unit
- Manufacturer: Hitachi Rail
- Built at: Hitachi Newton Aycliffe; Hitachi Pistoia
- Constructed: 2007–2009; 2014–present
- Entered service: 2017
- Number under construction: 31
- Number built: 250
- Fleet numbers: 800; 801; 802; 803; 805; 807; 810
- Operators: LNER; GWR; TransPennine Express; Hull Trains; Lumo; Avanti West Coast; East Midlands Railway

Specifications
- Maximum speed: 140 mph (225 km/h) (design)
- Track gauge: 1,435 mm (4 ft 8 1/2 in) standard gauge

The Hitachi AT300 is a family of intercity express multiple units developed by Hitachi Rail as part of its broad Hitachi A-train family of rolling stock. The first AT300 train in the United Kingdom was the Class 395 Javelin, which was the first time Hitachi Rail supplied trains outside of Japan. The trains were developed to operate domestic services that used the then-new High Speed 1.

Hitachi then won the tender for the Intercity Express Programme in 2011, which sought new rolling stock to replace the ageing InterCity 125—and later InterCity 225—fleets on the Great Western Main Line and East Coast Main Line. As part of the programme, the Hitachi Newton Aycliffe factory was built in County Durham. Part of the new fleets were built as bi-mode trains to allow for use on non-electrified lines, but are designed to be convertible to electric-only as electrification expands.

Since their introduction, the AT300 family has become a staple of British intercity rolling stock, with the number of units having risen from 29 to nearly 300 since 2017. By 2020, Hitachi was having to build some units in Italy because the Newton Aycliffe factory was at full capacity. As of 2026, 14 different types of AT300 train have been fully delivered, with one partially delivered and two under construction. All members of the fleet are AC overhead line multiple units, with additional DC third rail, diesel, and in-development battery traction for specific fleets.

== Design ==
The design of the AT300s is based on the Hitachi A-train family to which it belongs. The series was developed from the 885 series in use on Japan's railways, which in turn traces back to the design of the 400 Series Mini Shinkansen. However, the ATxxx naming system is only used by Hitachi outside of Japan. The main feature of the A-train design is that units are constructed by welding a body and adding mounting rails to which train-specific modular components can be attached. This method increases the efficiency of production and refurbishment.

The maximum design speed of AT300 trains is 140 miles per hour (225 km/h), but conventional UK railway signalling cannot support speeds higher than 125 mph (200 km/h), meaning only Class 395s travelling on High Speed 1 can reach design speed. However, the East Coast digital programme will increase the maximum operating speed on the southernmost section of the East Coast Main Line to 140 miles per hour (225 km/h), allowing trains to operate up to that speed between London King's Cross and the Stoke Tunnel.

The original Intercity Express Programme (IEP) trains were developed as bi-mode multiple units (BMUs), meaning they can be powered by both AC overhead wires and underfloor diesel generators. These trains were designated as the Class 800. The GWML and ECML franchise holders then further invested in electric multiple units (EMUs) for services on electrified routes, designated as Class 801s.

TPE 802207, which was modified to be able to run on battery power

The Class 800's specification allows for its conversion to a Class 801, as it is assumed that electrification will continue to expand in the future. In July 2016, it was announced that GWR's intended fleet of Class 801 units were to be converted from EMUs to BMUs due to delays in the electrification. Subsequently, these were reclassified as Class 800/3.

In March 2022, unit 802207, leased to TransPennine Express, was badly damaged in a collision at Heaton Depot. Rather than writing off the train, it was instead decided to repair it, and experiment with the possibility of replacing a diesel generator with a battery. The trial, which cost £17 million, was successful, and demonstrated the feasibility of a tri-mode AT300. This would allow trains leaving electrified track for shorter branch lines to run in a quieter and less polluting way.

== Order history ==
=== Javelins and the InterCity Express Programme ===
Two Class 395s at Rainham (Kent)

The United Kingdom became the first country outside Japan to place a major conventional rail order from Hitachi, when, in 2005, Southeastern ordered 29 electric multiple units for use on High Speed 1 domestic services. These trains are designated as Class 395 units, and were branded by Southeastern as the Javelin in reference to the 2012 Summer Olympics. The trains can run on AC overhead electrification or at a restricted top speed of 100 mph (160 km/h) on DC third rail electrification.

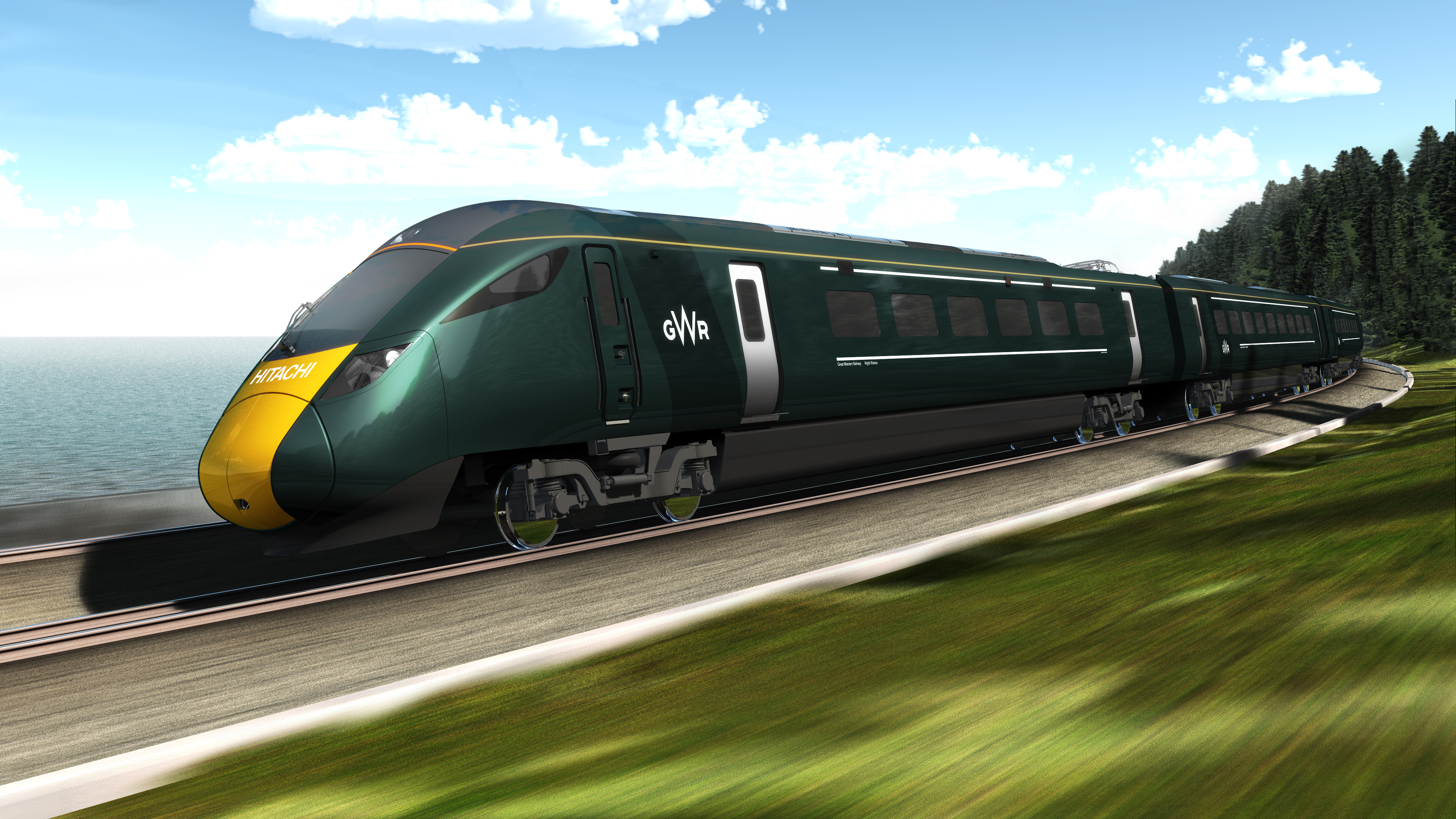
CGI image of the Hitachi AT300 ordered for Great Western Railway.

In 2009, it was announced that Hitachi was the preferred bidder to replace InterCity 125 and InterCity 225 sets on the Great Western Main Line (GWML) and East Coast Main Line (ECML) as part of the Intercity Express Programme (IEP). Hitachi proposed a design based on the AT300 series, which it initially named the Hitachi Super Express. The decision was then postponed in February 2010 due to the difficulty of government borrowing at the time. Hitachi was awarded the contract for the replacement of the InterCity 125 fleets in 2011, and for the InterCity 225 fleet in 2013. As part of the programme, the Hitachi Newton Aycliffe factory was built in County Durham.

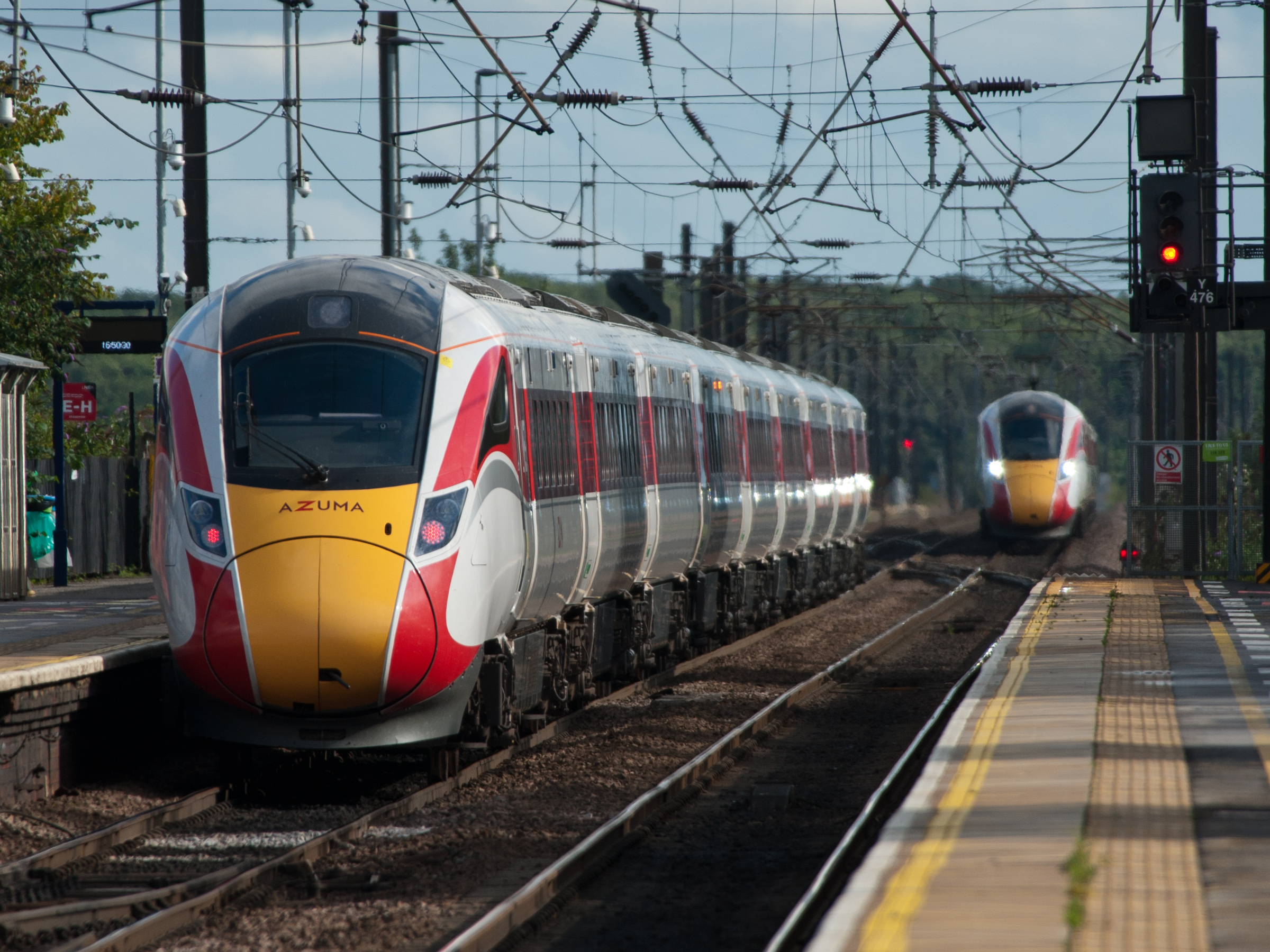
Two LNER Class 801 units passing at Northallerton in 2020

In March 2015, Great Western Railway (GWR) added to their AT300 order in the form of 29 Class 802 BMUs. The only difference between the Class 800 and the Class 802 is that the Class 802 has higher power output and larger fuel tanks, which allows it to better cope with longer-distance journeys to Devon and Cornwall. GWR's 802 trains were built at Hitachi Rail Italy's Pistoia plant. In mid-2016, GWR ordered seven more electro-diesel trains from Hitachi; these sets were produced at Hitachi Rail Italy.

The first of the Class 800s entered service with GWR in October 2017 and the first of the Class 802s entered service with GWR in August 2018, with all of the units branded as Intercity Express Trains (IET) by GWR. The first unit with London North Eastern Railway (LNER) entered service in May 2019 after a delay, with their first trains in service being Class 800s. Their Class 801s entered service afterwards in September 2019. The name for all LNER AT300s is Azuma, which is 'east' in Japanese.

=== Orders by other operators ===
Hull Trains 802302

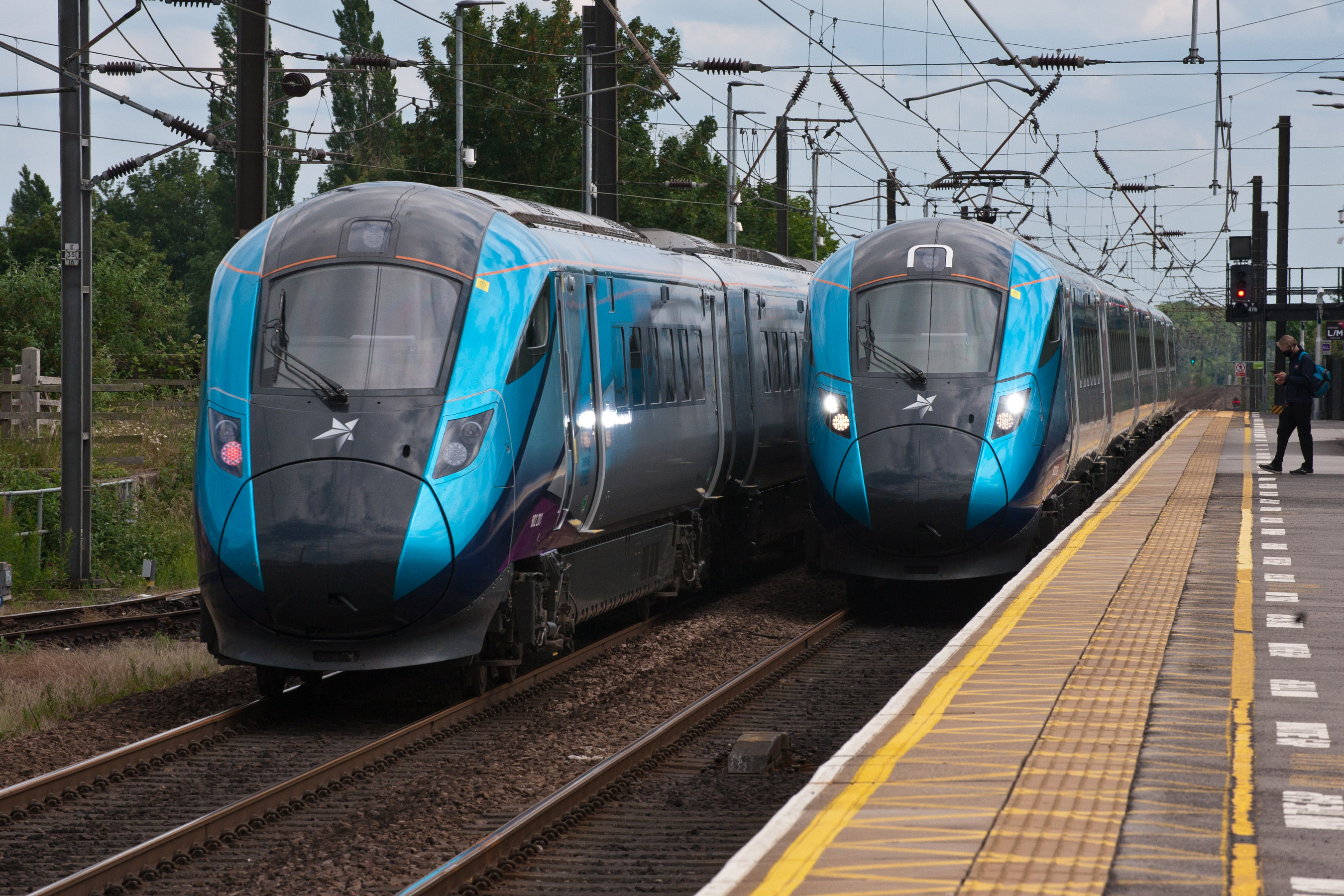
TransPennine Express 802201 and 802218

Lumo 803004

Avanti West Coast 805001

In September 2015, Hull Trains announced it was to order five bi-mode multiple units from the AT300 family, at a cost of £68M. These trains were grouped under the Class 802 desgination, and the fleet was the name Paragon (c.f. Hull Paragon railway station). The first unit was delivered in November 2019.

During early 2016, TransPennine Express (TPE) announced it would acquire 19 five-car AT300 bi-mode multiple units. The trains belonged to the Class 802 design, which has higher power output and larger fuel tanks than the original Class 800, and TPE named the fleet Nova 1. TPE intends to remove the diesel engines if their routes are fully electrified, which will raise their efficiency, but the bi-mode capability means they are not reliant on such electrification happening. On 28 September 2019 the trains entered revenue service.

In March 2019, FirstGroup-owned Lumo ordered a fleet of five 5-car AT300 electric multiple units for its open-access operations. Unlike other AT300 EMUs, there is no diesel engine for emergency or breakdown use. Instead, batteries power onboard facilities during a power failure. The fleet was designated as the Class 803 and entered revenue service on 25 October 2021.

In December 2019, Avanti West Coast announced an order for 23 AT300 trains from Hitachi, split between 10 electric multiple units and 13 bi-mode multiple units. The five-car bi-mode trains were designated the Class 805 and the seven-car electric-only trains were designated the Class 807. The new fleets allowed Avanti West Coast to retire their Class 221 Super Voyager trains and were part of their net-zero commitments. The trains entered revenue service in June 2024. The delivery of the Class 807 included Hitachi's 300th train to enter service in the UK, but this includes 70 Class 385s ordered by ScotRail, which are part of the AT200 series.

=== Ongoing orders ===
During July 2019, East Midlands Railway ordered 33 bi-mode AT300 trains from Hitachi. Hitachi stated that these trains will be an 'evolution' of the design supplied to other UK operators, with a modified nose profile, shorter vehicles and four diesel engines per five-car set instead of the three seen on Class 800 and Class 802 trains. Designated as the Class 810, they have been branded by the operator as Aurora. As of August 2026, 11 trainsets have been delivered, with delivery being affected by multiple setbacks.

In December 2024, Hitachi Rail stated in a press release that it had entered into a contract with FirstGroup (which owns Lumo and Hull Trains) and Angel Trains to lease 13 new five-car electric, battery-electric or bi-mode trains for open-access operations. The units are to be used for a new London–Carmarthen route and to provide extra units for FirstGroup's existing services. FirstGroup have agreed to add 13 more units to the order if their open-access applications are successful. The units will be built at Newton Aycliffe, with their delivery expected to commence in late 2027. The order allowed the Newton Aycliffe factory to remain open; the TOPS designation of the new trains has not been confirmed.

In April 2025, Grand Central announced plans to order a fleet of 9 new five-car tri-mode trains, built by Hitachi Rail. These are planned for delivery in 2028 and will be known as the Class 820. The tri-mode design for the trains was made feasible by the 2024 development of battery technology on a Class 802 (see § Design).

== Fleet details ==
Key to symbols
B Battery
D Diesel
O Overhead line (25 kV AC)
T Third rail (750 V DC)

=== In service ===
Class	Image	Type	Operator	Brand	Quantity	Top service speed (Note: All units have a maximum design speed of 140 miles per hour (230 km/h).) mph (kph)	Cars per unit	Year built	Refs
395		EMU O T	Southeastern	Javelin	29 (Note: Unit numbers 395001–395029)	140 (225)	6	2007–2009	
800/0		BMU D O	Great Western Railway	Intercity Express Train (IET)	36 (Note: Unit numbers 800001–800036)	125 (200)	5	2014–2018	
800/1		BMU D O	London North Eastern Railway	Azuma	13 (Note: Unit numbers 800101–800113)	125 (200) (Note: The East Coast digital programme will increase the maximum operating speed on some sections of the East Coast Main Line to 140 miles per hour (230 km/h).)	9	2014–2018	
800/2		BMU D O	London North Eastern Railway	Azuma	10 (Note: Unit numbers 800201–800210)	125 (200)	5	2014–2018	
800/2		BMU D O				125 (200)	5	2014–2018	
800/3		BMU D O	Great Western Railway	Intercity Express Train (IET)	21 (Note: Unit numbers 800301–800321)	125 (200)	9	2014–2018	
801/1		EMUO	London North Eastern Railway	Azuma	12 (Note: Unit numbers 801101–801112)	125 (200)	5	2017–2019	
801/2		EMUO	London North Eastern Railway	Azuma	30 (Note: Unit numbers 801201–801230)	125 (200)	9	2017–2019	
802/0		BMU D O	Great Western Railway	Intercity Express Train (IET)	22 (Note: Unit numbers 802001–802022)	125 (200)	5	2017–2019	
802/1		BMU D O	Great Western Railway	Intercity Express Train (IET)	14 (Note: Unit numbers 802101–802114)	125 (200)	9	2017–2019	
802/2		BMU D O	TransPennine Express	Nova 1	19 (Note: Unit numbers 802201–802219)	125 (200)	5	2018–2019	
802/3		BMU D O	Hull Trains	Paragon	5 (Note: Unit numbers 802301–802305)	125 (200)	5	2019	
803		EMU O	Lumo	None	5 (Note: Unit numbers 803001–803005)	125 (200)	5	2020–2021	
805		BMU D O	Avanti West Coast	Evero	13 (Note: Unit numbers 805001–805013)	125 (200)	5	2021–2024	
807		EMUO	Avanti West Coast	Evero	10 (Note: Unit numbers 807001–807010)	125 (200)	7	2020–2024	
810		BMU D O	East Midlands Railway	Aurora	33 (Note: Unit numbers 810001–810033. Only 11 have been delivered.)	125 (200)	5	2020–present	

=== In development ===
Class	Type	Operator	Quantity	Top speed mph (kph)		Cars per unit	Refs
Class	Type	Operator	Ordered	Design	Service	Cars per unit	Refs
820	BMU D O or B O	Grand Central	9	140 (225)	125 (200)	5	
TBA	BMU D O	Lumo and Hull Trains	13 or 26	140 (225)	125 (200)	5	
