= Class 807 =

Class 807 may refer to:

- British Rail Class 807
- ICE 2
