= Eastern seaboard =

An eastern seaboard can mean any easternmost part of a continent, or its countries, states and cities.

Eastern seaboard may also refer to:

- Eastern states of Australia
- East Coast of the United States
- Eastern seaboard of Thailand
- Northeast megalopolis, often coterminous with "Eastern seaboard", the most heavily urbanized region of the United States

== See also ==
- East Coast (disambiguation)
- West Coast (disambiguation)
