= Class 805 =

Class 805 may refer to:

- British Rail Class 805
- ICE 2
