= British Rail Class 820 =

Hitachi tri-mode train

- Concept art
- Stock type: Tri-Mode Multiple Unit
- In service: 2028 (planned)
- Manufacturer: Hitachi Rail
- Built at: Newton Aycliffe Manufacturing Facility, England
- Family name: AT300
- Replaced: Class 180 & Class 221 (future)
- Number under construction: 9
- Formation: 5 cars per unit
- Owner: Angel Trains
- Operator: Grand Central

Specifications
- Electric system: 25 kV 50 Hz AC overhead
- Current collection: Pantograph
- Track gauge: 1,435 mm (4 ft 8 1/2 in) standard gauge

The British Rail Class 820 is a type of tri-mode multiple unit belong to the Hitachi AT300 family of trains, which will be manufactured by Hitachi Rail for the open-access operator Grand Central. Based on the Hitachi A-train design, 9 five-car units will be built, powered by 25 kV AC 50 Hz electrification, as well as battery and diesel.

== Design ==
The Class 820 is the first Hitachi AT300 train to be designed with battery power. The feasibility of this tri-mode arrangement was developed in 2024 through the modified repair of TransPennine Express unit 802207, which had been badly damaged in a 2022 depot collision. During the repair, one of its diesel generators was replaced by a battery.

The trial, which cost £17 million, was successful, and demonstrated the feasibility of a tri-mode AT300. This would allow trains leaving electrified track for shorter branch lines to run in a quieter and less polluting way.

== Development ==
On 3 April 2025, Grand Central announced plans to order a fleet of nine new five-car tri-mode trains. The units are powered by 25 kV AC 50 Hz electrification, as well as battery and diesel power.

In March 2026, it was announced that Grand Central's new fleet will be known as the Class 820 under TOPS. The fleet will cost £300 million and is to be financed by Angel Trains, with the fleet being built by Hitachi Rail at its Newton Aycliffe Manufacturing Facility, at a cost of £300 million.

The first deliveries of the Class 820 are planned for 2028 and will replace Grand Central's Class 180 Adelante fleet. The new fleet is part of Grand Central's expansion to serve Cleethorpes and Seaham, as well as increasing its service to Bradford.
