= Class 804 =

Class 804 may refer to:

- British Rail Class 804, the original anticipated classification for what would later become the British Rail Class 810
- ICE 1 restaurant cars
