= Rock Rail =

British rolling stock leasing company

Rock Rail Holdings Limited
- Type: Private
- Founded: 2014
- Headquarters: London, England
- Area served: United Kingdom; United States
- Products: Rolling stock leasing
- Parent: Rock Infrastructure
- Website: rock-group.co.uk

Rock Rail is a British rolling stock company (ROSCO). It was established by Rock Infrastructure in 2014.

Rock Rail signed its first rail leasing deal for 25 Class 717 with train operator Govia Thameslink Railway in February 2016. This was promptly followed by a large order for 58 Class 745 and Class 755 multiple units for Abellio Greater Anglia. In the following years, numerous other leasing arrangements and strategic partnerships have come about between Rock Rail and other organisations, including South Western Railway, Avanti West Coast. and East Midlands Railway.

== History ==
Rock Rail originated in 2014 with Rock Infrastructure; the company set it up as its dedicated rail leasing subsidiary on 1 July 2016. It has been described as an investor and asset manager of passenger-orientated rolling stock and other rail-side infrastructure, such as electrification, digital signalling and depots, and introducing new technologies to the sector. Rock Rail has claimed its investments are underpinned by the consideration of environmental, social and governance factors. It was initially focused upon operations within the British rail market exclusively.

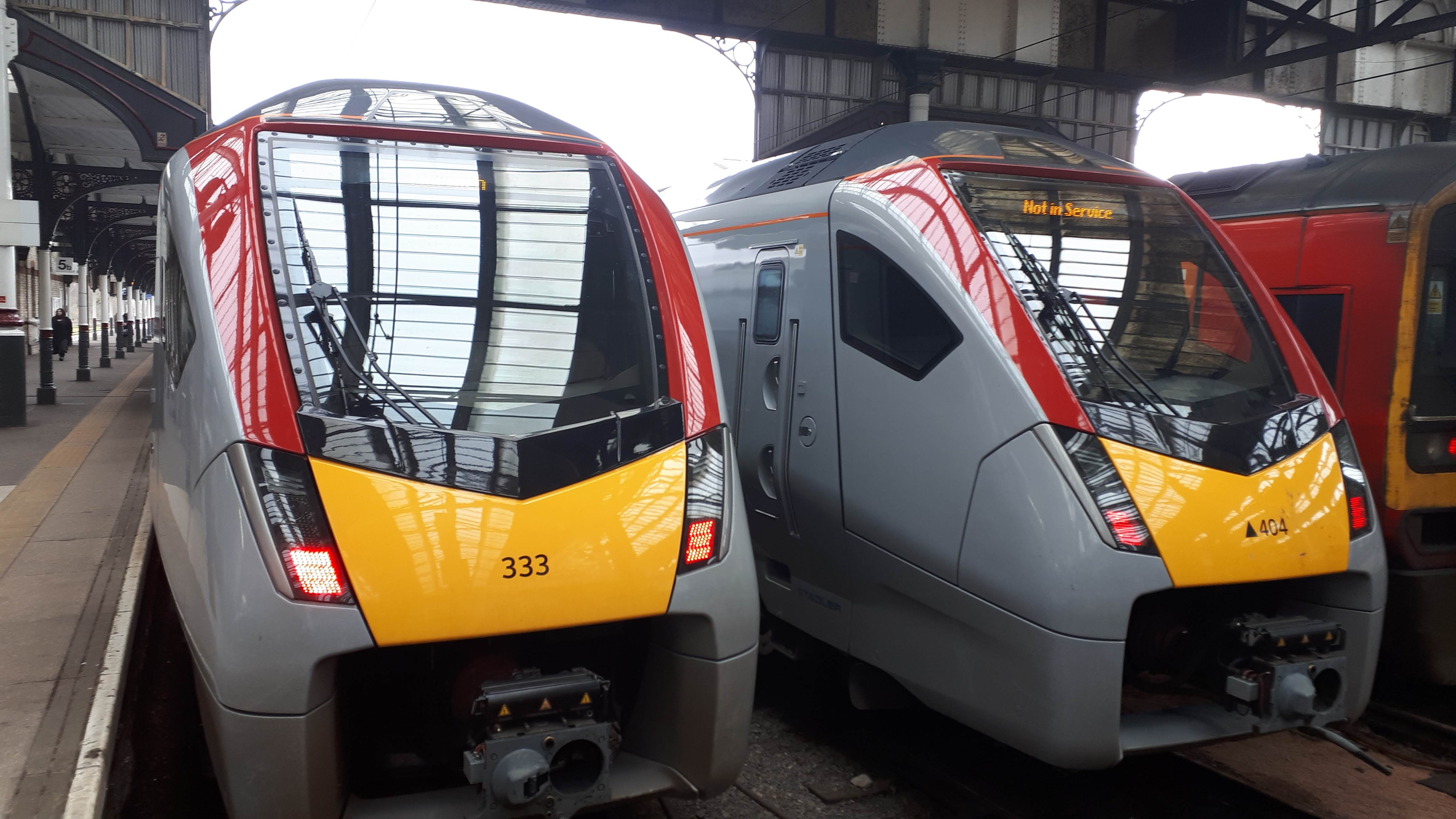
A pair of Class 755 multiple units, 2020

During February 2016, the company announced its first rolling stock leasing deal, valued at £200 million, for 25 Class 717 dual-voltage electric multiple units (EMUs) on behalf of Govia Thameslink Railway. On 4 October 2016, Rock Rail also financed the purchase of 20 Class 745 and 38 Class 755 multiple units for Abellio Greater Anglia; the deal, at a cost reportedly in excess of £600 million, was described by Abellio UK Managing Director Dominic Booth as one part of "the largest-ever privately-funded train procurement in the UK".

Rock Rail's founder, Mark Swindell, described the company's role as a 'direct pipeline' for investors in infrastructure, contrasting it against Private Finance Initiatives and index funds, which allegedly made it an object of interest to numerous other companies within the insurance industry. Management has reportedly viewed the general state of Britain's rolling stock as 'elderly' and prime opportunities for being involved in its replacement.

Throughout the early 2020s, Rock Rail finalised numerous contracts with train operators, such as for the purchase of Class 701 electric multiple units for South Western Railway, Hitachi-built Class 805 and 807 high speed trains for Avanti West Coast, and similar Class 810s for East Midlands Railway. By November 2020, Rock Rail had secured £3 billion of investment in excess of 1,500 new rolling stock, which was for the use of five separate British train franchises, since February 2016; this activity had reportedly accounted for roughly 40 percent of all passenger rolling stock orders in the UK rail market across this period. the company's fleet had exclusively comprised electric and bi-mode trains.

By the end of the 2010s, Rock Rail had diversified its operations into both the Australian and continental European markets. In December 2021, a Memorandum of Understanding was signed between Rock Rail and the University of Birmingham's Centre for Railway Research and Education (BCRRE) for a partnership on addressing railway rolling stock cyber security issues.

In 2026 Rock Rail was selected by the Massachusetts Bay Transportation Authority and Keolis in the United States to procure seven 4-car BEMU trains from Stadler for use on the Fairmount Line.

== Assets ==
Class	Number	Operator	Status
701	71	South Western Railway	In service
717	25	Govia Thameslink Railway	In service
745	20	Abellio Greater Anglia	In service
755	38	Abellio Greater Anglia	In service
805	13	Avanti West Coast	In service
807	10	Avanti West Coast	In Service
810	33	East Midlands Railway	Under construction
-	7	Massachusetts Bay Transportation Authority	Planning
