= Westcoast =

Westcoast, as one word, is used by the following:

- Westcoast Aftershocc, and album by American hip hop duo Tha Dogg Pound
- Westcoast Air, a Canadian airline
- Westcoast Curling Classic, an annual curling tournament held on Thanksgiving weekend in New Westminster, British Columbia
- Westcoast klipfish, the South African name for the Clinus heterodon, a species of clinid, a marine fish
- Westcoaster Mailster, a small three-wheeled vehicle used for mail delivery in the United States during the 1950s and 60s
- Westcoast Limited, UK and Ireland IT distributor
- Westcoast Pipeline, a natural gas pipeline in British Columbia built by Westcoast Transmission Co., later renamed Westcoast Energy, and bought since by Duke Energy of Charlotte, North Carolina
- Westcoast Songwriter's Conference, an annual conference hosted by the Westcoast Songwriter's organization, a nonprofit educational organization founded in 1979

== See also ==
- West Coast (disambiguation)
