= Oxley TRSMD =

Railway maintenance depot in Wolverhampton, England

Oxley T&RSMD
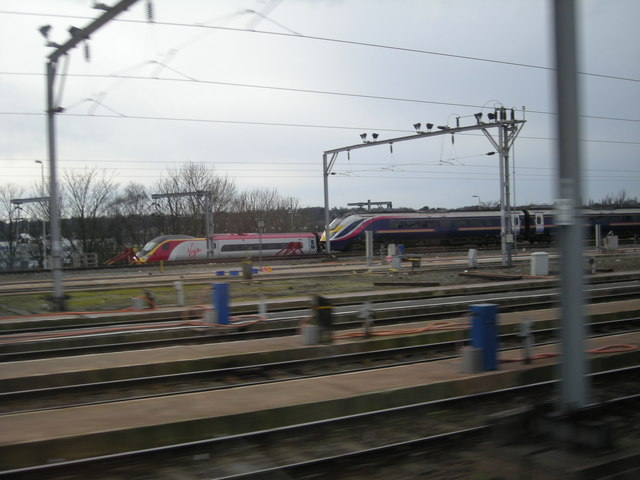
- Virgin Trains Pendolino stock, together with then-stored Adelante units, at the depot.
- Interactive map of Oxley T&RSMD

Location
- Location: Wolverhampton, United Kingdom
- Coordinates: 52.6067°N 2.1395°W
- OS grid: SJ905010

Characteristics
- Owner: Alstom
- Depot code: OXY (1907-); 84B (1948-1963); 2B (1963-1967); OY (1973-present)
- Type: DMU, EMU
- Rolling stock: Class 805; Class 807

History
- Opened: 1907
- Original: GWR
- Pre-grouping: GWR
- Post-grouping: GWR

Oxley Traction and Rolling Stock Maintenance Depot is a railway depot located in Wolverhampton, West Midlands, operated by Alstom to maintain Avanti West Coast's British Rail Class 390 Pendolino stock for the West Coast Main Line.

== History ==
The GWR on reaching Wolverhampton Low Level railway station in 1854, had built their own broad gauge shed on the opposite side of the Stafford Road to the existing Shrewsbury and Birmingham Railway Wolverhampton railway works, between the road and the London Midland and Scottish Railway line to Crewe. Located opposite and accessible from Dunstall Park railway station, the shed backed onto the Stafford Road, with the throat facing Wolverhampton Low Level. As the major depot of the region, it was constructed as a heavy maintenance repair shop but the GWR also needed a shed to replace the former S&B shed, which had easier access to the freight yard which was on the opposite side of the line.

The decision was taken to build a new GWR standard-pattern two-turntable with north light roof shed, 0.25 miles (0.40 km) toward Wolverhampton Low Level, which opened on 1 July 1907 under the code OXY. Based on the pattern design set by Old Oak Common, the narrowness of the site meant that the two 65 feet (20 m) turntables were set one behind the other. Provision was however made for two further turntables should the need arise, and so the standard pattern twin-ramp coaling stage was offset to allow for future development. The two lifting shops had 35 tonnes (39 tons) overhead hoists, while ash shelters were provided during World War II.

In January 1963, both Stafford Road and Oxley came under the control of London Midland Region, who choose to close the dilapidated Stafford Road with immediate effect. All locomotives and servicing hence moved to Oxley from September 1963, which now gained code 2B.

Closed to steam in March 1967, the shed was rebuilt as a diesel maintenance facility, housing both locomotives and DMUs.

== Present ==
After Pendolinos were chosen as the preferred new rolling stock by the former InterCity West Coast Franchise holder Virgin Trains, Alstom needed maintenance facilities.

The entire Pendolino fleet is allocated to the (Alstom) Manchester Traincare Centre at Longsight, where heavy maintenance is carried out. Longsight boasts a hoist on which an entire Pendolino set can be lifted. Lighter maintenance, cleaning and overnight stabling is carried out at Alstom's other centres: Wembley (London); Edge Hill (Liverpool); Polmadie (Glasgow); and Oxley, which were redeveloped for their purposes. Electrification of the Wolverhampton to Shrewsbury Line from Stafford Road Junction to Oxley, is provided solely to enable electric stock to access Oxley TRSMD, and is therefore constructed as a catenary style suitable for low speeds only.

The depot is also the home depot, for Avanti's Class 805 and 807 fleet, under a joint train maintenance agreement between Avanti and Hitachi Rail - the manufacturer of the stated trains.
