= Hitachi Newton Aycliffe =

Rolling stock factory in County Durham, England

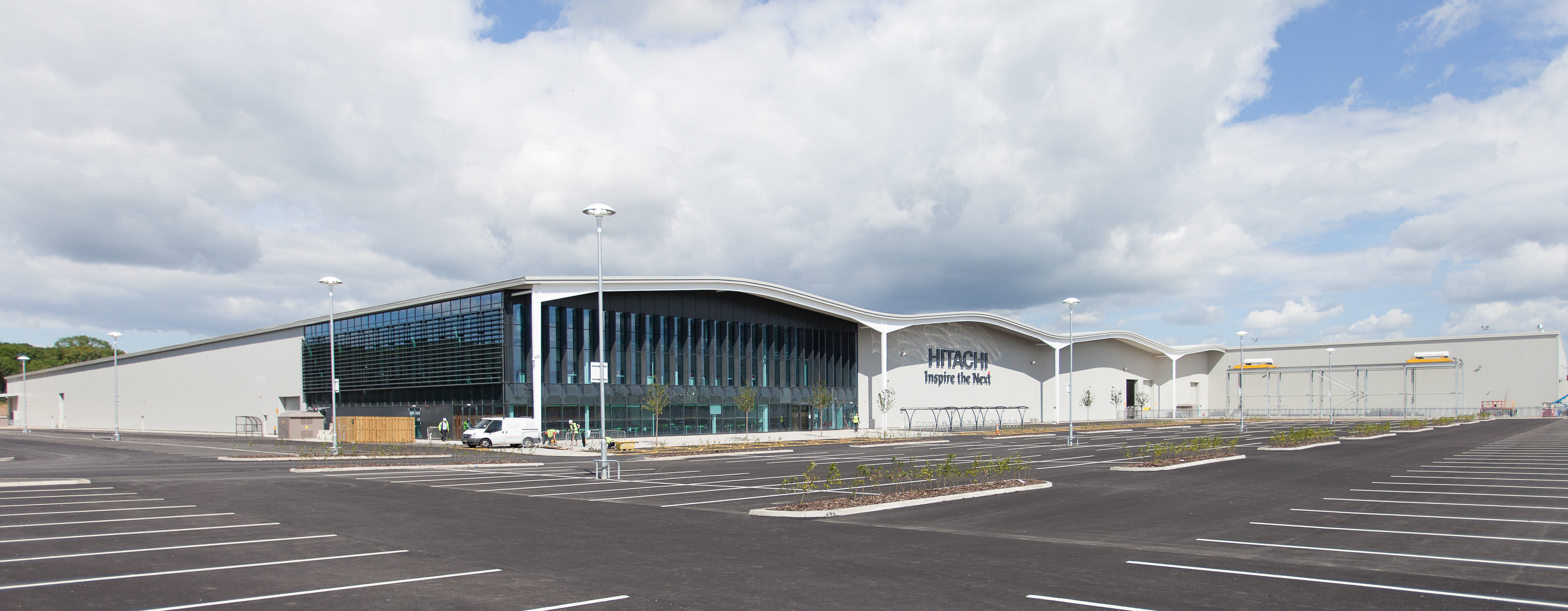
- Newton Aycliffe Rail Vehicle Assembly Facility exterior

- Location in County Durham
- Built: 2013–2015
- Operated: 3 September 2015–to date
- Location: Merchant Park, Millennium Way, Aycliffe Business Park, Newton Aycliffe, DL5 6UG; Newton Aycliffe, County Durham
- Coordinates: 54.5936°N 1.5893°W
- Industry: Rolling stock assembly
- Products: Class 385; Class 800; Class 801; Class 802; Class 803; Class 805; Class 807; Class 810
- Employees: 1,000 (2017); 700 (2020)
- Area: 43,000 m^{2} (460,000 sq ft)
- Owner: Hitachi Rail

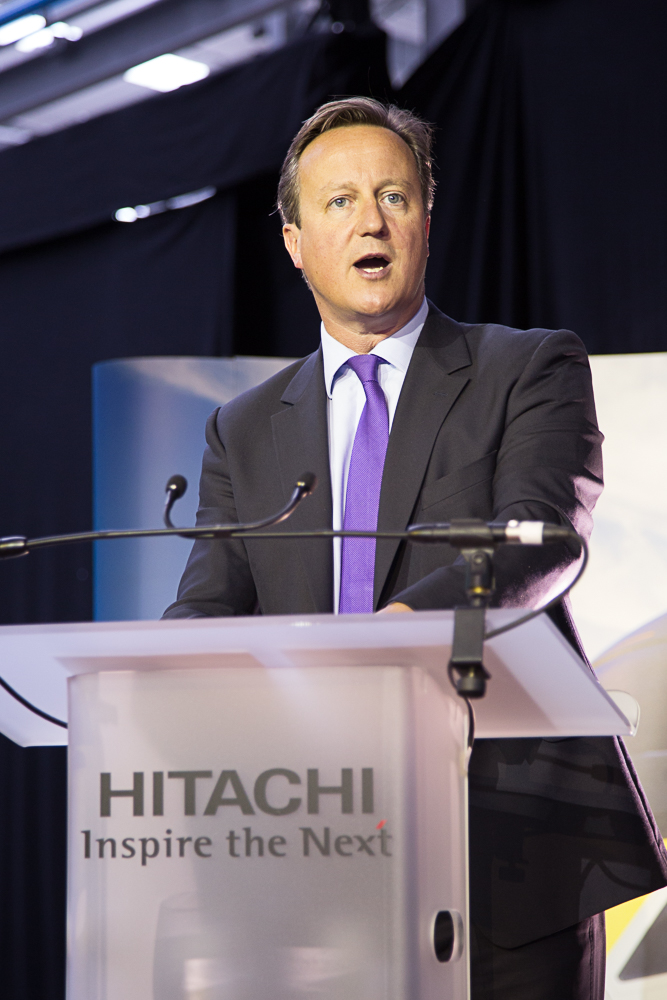
David Cameron at the opening of Hitachi Newton Aycliffe

Hitachi Newton Aycliffe (also known as Newton Aycliffe Manufacturing Facility) is a railway rolling stock assembly plant owned by Hitachi Rail Europe, situated in Newton Aycliffe, County Durham, in the North East of England.

The Newton Aycliffe facility was created as a result of the Agility Trains consortium being selected to produce high speed trains for the Intercity Express Programme (IEP) in 2009. During 2011, Hitachi announced its selection of the site and construction work commenced two years later. The 43,000 m^{2} (460,000 sq ft) factory, which was officially opened on 3 September 2015, was completed at a cost of £82 million. Initially, the facility only performed assembly, using components that were produced elsewhere to complete trains, and no actual manufacturing operations took place. However, some manufacturing activities have been performed at Newton Aycliffe for later-built trains.

Originally, the factory assembled the Class 800 and Class 802 trainsets for the IEP. However, Hitachi subsequently secured further orders, such as to produce Class 385 EMUs for the Edinburgh to Glasgow Improvement Programme, Class 802s for TransPennine Express, and a fleet of 165 vehicles for East Midlands Railway. By 2020, the plant reportedly employed around 700 people, and was engaged in building the Class 803, 805, 807 and 810 trainsets. In December 2021, it was announced that the rolling stock for HS2 would be produced as a joint venture between Hitachi and Alstom, and that part of the manufacturing for this order would take place at Newton Aycliffe.

== History ==
=== Origins and construction ===
In 2005, the UK Department for Transport (DfT) decided to procure new trains to replace the InterCity 125 fleet on both the Great Western Main Line and East Coast Main Line, launching the Intercity Express Programme (IEP) to this end. During June 2008, three companies, the British infrastructure specialist John Laing Group, the Japanese rolling stock manufacturer Hitachi and the British investment firm Barclays Private Equity, created the Agility Trains consortium for the purpose of jointly bidding for the contract to design, manufacture, and maintain a fleet of long-distance trains for the IEP.

On 12 February 2009, the Government announced that Agility Trains had been selected as the preferred bidder for the contract, with the Siemens-Bombardier consortia as reserve bidders – the value of the contract was then estimated at £7.5 billion, including replacements for both Intercity 125 and 225 trains. In 2011, Hitachi chose the site of its British factory at developer Merchant Place Developments' Amazon Park (later renamed Merchant Park mid 2013) site in Newton Aycliffe, County Durham, close to Heighington railway station and adjacent to the Tees Valley Line. (Note: 54.59412°N 1.588495°W – location of the Hitachi factory, Amazon Park / Merchant Park, Newton Aycliffe.) Hitachi announced its intention to proceed with construction of the facility in July 2012, after financial closure was achieved for the part of the train order that concerned the GWML. This would be the first factory that Hitachi had built in Europe.

On 1 November 2013, contract for the construction of the £82M 43,000 m^{2} (460,000 sq ft) factory was awarded to Shepherd Group. Construction of the factory was scheduled to start in 2013, with train production beginning in 2015, and the plant reaching full production capacity in 2016. Erection of the frame of the factory was complete by June 2014, with an official topping out ceremony held in October 2014.

=== Opening and activities ===
On 3 September 2015, the factory was officially opened in the presence of Hiroaki Nakanishi (Hitachi), Patrick McLoughlin (MP), Claire Perry (MP), George Osborne (MP), David Cameron (Prime Minister of the United Kingdom) and 500 guests. The facility created 420 jobs, and aimed to employ more than 700 at maximum capacity. It was reported that it received over 16,000 job applications, in an area where the Teesside Steelworks recently closed down with a loss of 3,000 jobs. Upon its opening, no actual manufacturing operations took place at the facility; it instead assembled components that had been built elsewhere into completed trains. Within two years of opening, in excess of 1,000 employees were working at the site.

During January 2016, it was announced that Hitachi's successful tender for the Edinburgh to Glasgow Improvement Programme consisting of new Class 385s would be primarily assembled at Newton Aycliffe, and as part of FirstGroup's successful tender for the TransPennine Express franchise, it was announced in March 2016 that new Class 802 rolling stock would be assembled at Newton Aycliffe. It was stated by Hiroaki Nakanishi that a UK vote to leave the European Union would result in a scaling back of investment in Newton Aycliffe, a comment which was echoed by local Labour politician and backer of Britain Stronger in Europe, Phil Wilson.

In March 2019, Lumo ordered five AT300 trains for its services on the East Coast Main Line. The five units were built at Newton Aycliffe and would be maintained by Hitachi for ten years as part of the £100 million deal. When this order was announced, Hitachi stated that the plant needed new orders, especially after it had lost out on London Underground's New Tube for London contract to rival firm Siemens. The company said that it would be bidding for a proposed bi-mode fleet for the East Midlands franchise and the replacement trains for the Nexus contract on the Tyne and Wear Metro. The units were designated as Class 803.

In July 2019, it was confirmed that Hitachi would build a fleet of 33 five-car bi-mode units for East Midlands Railway. The project was listed as being worth £400 million.

In late 2019, it was announced that Avanti West Coast had ordered 23 A-train units to replace the 20 strong fleet of Class 221 Super Voyagers. Nominally worth over £350 million, the order is for 13 five-car bi-mode units, and 10 seven-car electric trains, later named Classes 805 and 807 respectively.

By 2020, the plant reportedly employed around 700 people, and was engaged in assembling/building Classes 803, 805, 807 and 810. These train orders were to see the factory in business until 2023, when the final unit was due to be delivered.

In December 2021, it was announced that a joint venture between Hitachi and Alstom had won the contract to build 54 trains for the High Speed 2 programme. The rolling stock would be constructed at Newton Aycliffe and Alstom plants in Crewe and Derby. However, questions over the future of this order have been raised.

During December 2023, Hitachi opted to write down the value of the Newton Aycliffe plant by £64.8 million, raising concerns over its future, as well as that of the wider British rail manufacturing sector. The company publicly emphasized that this decision did not directly threaten the future of the plant and that its production capability remained available for further rolling stock orders if they are placed. In April 2024, a company spokesperson remarked that closure would be inevitable if new orders were not forthcoming to keep the site active; it was also reported that redundancies at the facilities could possibly commence as soon as that June.

In December 2024, Hitachi Rail stated in a press release that it had entered into a contract with FirstGroup and Angel Trains to lease 14 new five-car electric, battery-electric or bi-mode trains for First Rail's open-access operations, which will be manufactured at Newton Aycliffe, with their delivery expected to commence in late 2027. These trains will be used on a newly announced London-Carmarthen route, and to increase the number of carriages on the existing Lumo and Hull Trains services. The agreement includes an option to add 13 more trains to the order if more of First Rail's recently submitted open-access applications are successful.

== Site ==
The factory covers 31.5 acres (12.7 ha) of land with a building footprint of 475,000 sq ft (44,100 m^{2}). It can assemble a maximum of 35 vehicles a month. The site is situated close to where George Stephenson assembled Locomotion No. 1, the first locomotive to carry passengers on a public rail line.

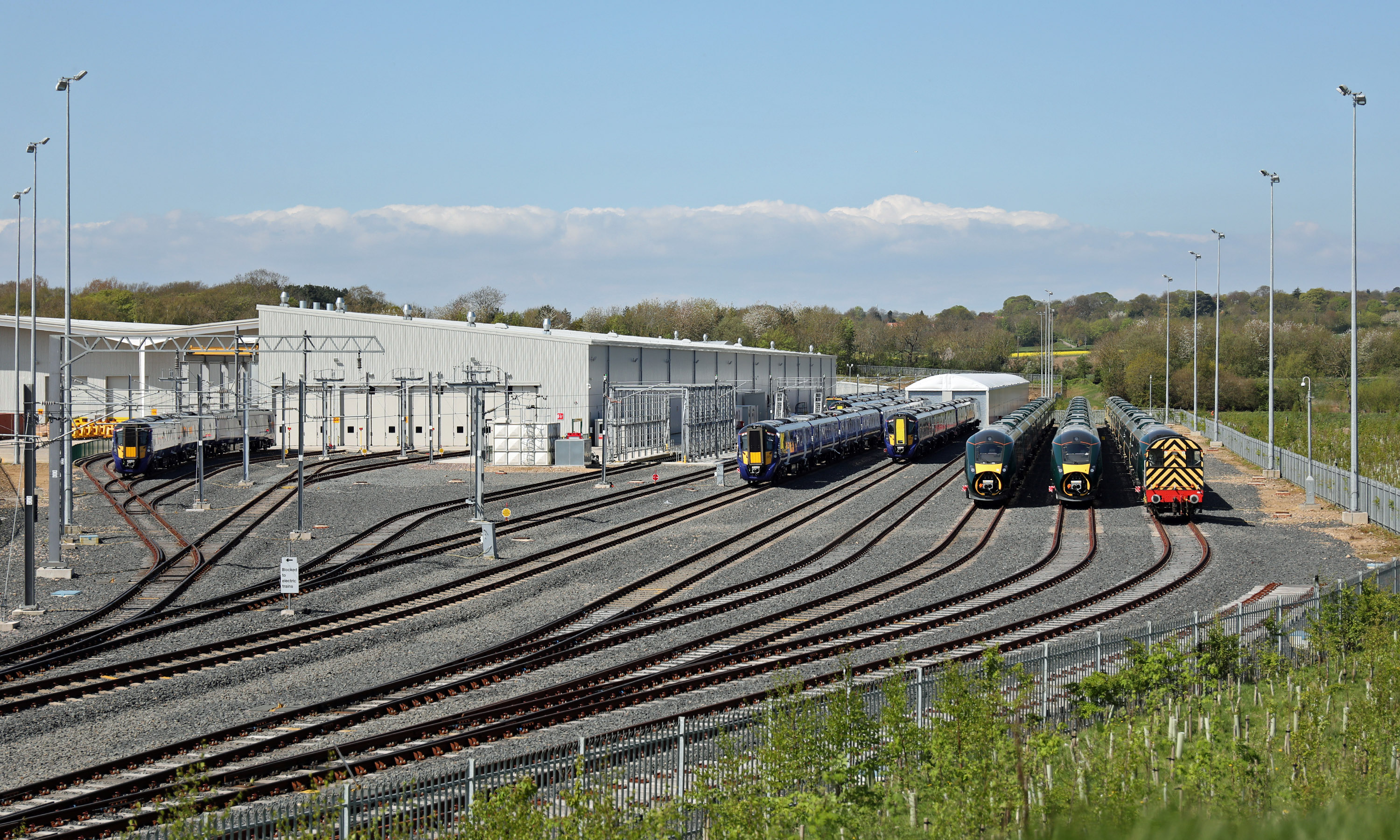
New Class 385 and 800 trains outside the facility, with a Class 08 shunter to carry out yard movements.

== Train types ==
The following classes have been assembled at the plant:

- Class 385
- Class 800
- Class 801
- Class 802
- Class 803
- Class 805
- Class 807
- Class 810
- Milan Metro Line 4 EMUs, final fitout only

== Sources ==
- Review of the Intercity Express Programme by Sir Andrew Foster, Department of Transport, 6 July 2010, archived from the original on 7 November 2012
  - Foster, Andrew (June 2010), A Review of the Intercity Express Programme (PDF), archived from the original (PDF) on 5 October 2011
  - Foster, Andrew (June 2010a), A Review of the Intercity Express Programme (Annex) (PDF), archived from the original (PDF) on 7 November 2012
