= West Coast =

West Coast or west coast may refer to:

== Geography ==
=== Australia ===
- Western Australia
- West Coast of South Australia
- West Coast, Tasmania
  - West Coast Council, a local government area
  - West Coast Range, mountain range in the region

=== Canada ===
- British Columbia Coast

=== China ===
- Huangdao District, literally as West Coast New Area, also known as Qingdao West Coast
- West Coast Economic Zone

=== Gambia ===
- West Coast Division (Gambia)

=== Germany ===
- West Coast, Germany

=== India ===
- West Coast of India
- Malabar coast, south-western India
- Western Coastal Plains

=== Indonesia ===
- West Coast Regency, Lampung

=== Isle of Man ===
- West Coast Marine Nature Reserve

=== Malaysia ===
- West Coast of Peninsular Malaysia
- West Coast Division, Sabah, east Malaysia (on the island of Borneo)

=== New Zealand ===
- West Coast Region, a region in the South Island

=== Singapore ===
- West Coast, Singapore
- West Coast Constituency, a former defunct electoral division in Singapore
  - West Coast Group Representation Constituency, an electoral division existed from 1997 thru 2025.
  - West Coast-Jurong West Group Representation Constituency, an electoral division renamed from the former West Coast in 2025.
- West Region, Singapore

=== South Africa ===
- West Coast District Municipality
- West Coast, Western Cape

=== Sweden ===
- Västkusten, the Swedish West Coast, located in Skagerrak and Kattegat and including all of the coast of the provinces of Västergötland, Halland and Bohuslän and part of Scania

=== United States ===
- West Coast of the United States
- Western United States (by extension of the above)

== Education ==
- West Coast Baptist College, in Lancaster, California
- West Coast University, a health-care oriented university in California and Florida
- West Coast University (Panama)

== Government ==
- West Coast (New Zealand electorate), a former parliamentary electorate, 1972–1996

== Music ==
- West Coast (album), a 2006 album by Swedish electronic band Studio
- "West Coast" (G-Eazy and Blueface song), 2019
- "West Coast" (Lana Del Rey song), 2014
- "West Coast" (OneRepublic song), 2022
- "West Coast", a song by The Neighbourhood, 2013
- "West Coast", a song by Coconut Records (musician)
- "West Coast", a song by Crazy Town from their album The Brimstone Sluggers
- "West Coast", a song by Imagine Dragons from their album Origins
- "West Coast", a song by Ketty Lester, 1965
- West Coast hip hop, a subgenre of hip hop

== Transport ==
- West Coast Air, a scheduled and charter airline based in Vancouver
- West Coast Choppers, a company selling chopper-style motorcycles in Texas (originally based in California)
- West Coast Customs, a car remodeling company in California

Rail

- Florida West Coast Railroad, a railroad running from Newberry to Trenton
- West Coast Railway (disambiguation)
- West Coast (train), former passenger train from Los Angeles to Portland, Oregon
- West Coast Express, a commuter railway in British Columbia
- West Coast Main Line, one of the main rail corridors in the United Kingdom
  - Avanti West Coast, current operator of the West Coast Main Line
- West Coast Railways, a British railway charter train operator based in Carnforth, Lancashire
- Western Railway zone, operating in parts of western coastal India

== Other ==
- Qingdao West Coast F.C., a Chinese association football club
- West Coast Eagles, an Australian rules football club, also known as West Coast
- West Coast (horse), an American racehorse
- West Coast (TV series), a Canadian variety show

== See also ==
- Chanel West Coast (born 1988), American entertainer
- History of the west coast of North America
- Westcoast (disambiguation)
- West Coast Avengers, a Marvel Comics superhero team
- West Coast Computer Faire, a former computer industry conference
- West Coast Conference, a US athletics league
- West Coast League, US baseball league
- West Coast liberal, a stereotype encountered in American political culture
