= British Rail Class 803 =

British electric multiple unit

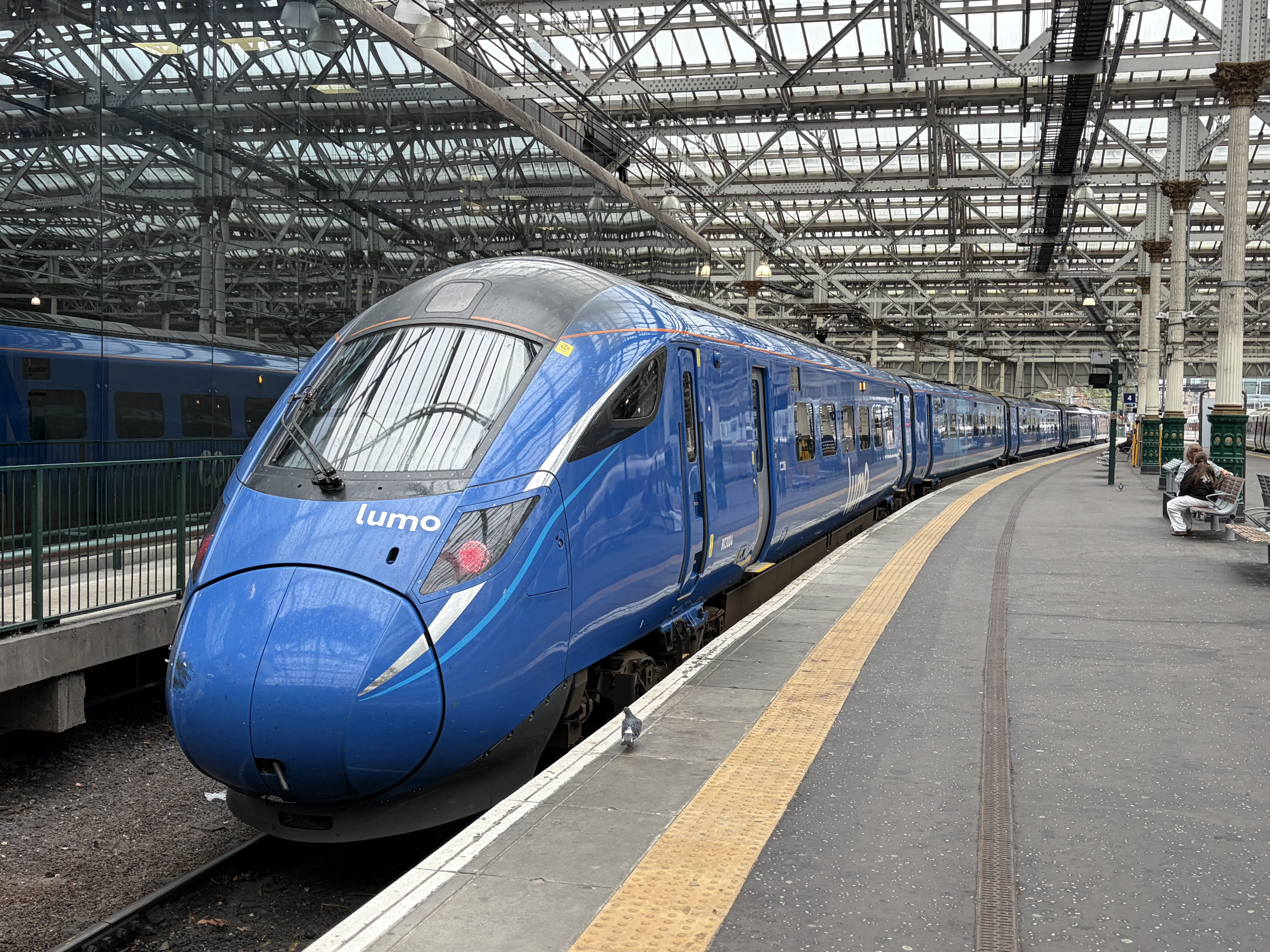
- Lumo Class 803 at Edinburgh Waverley

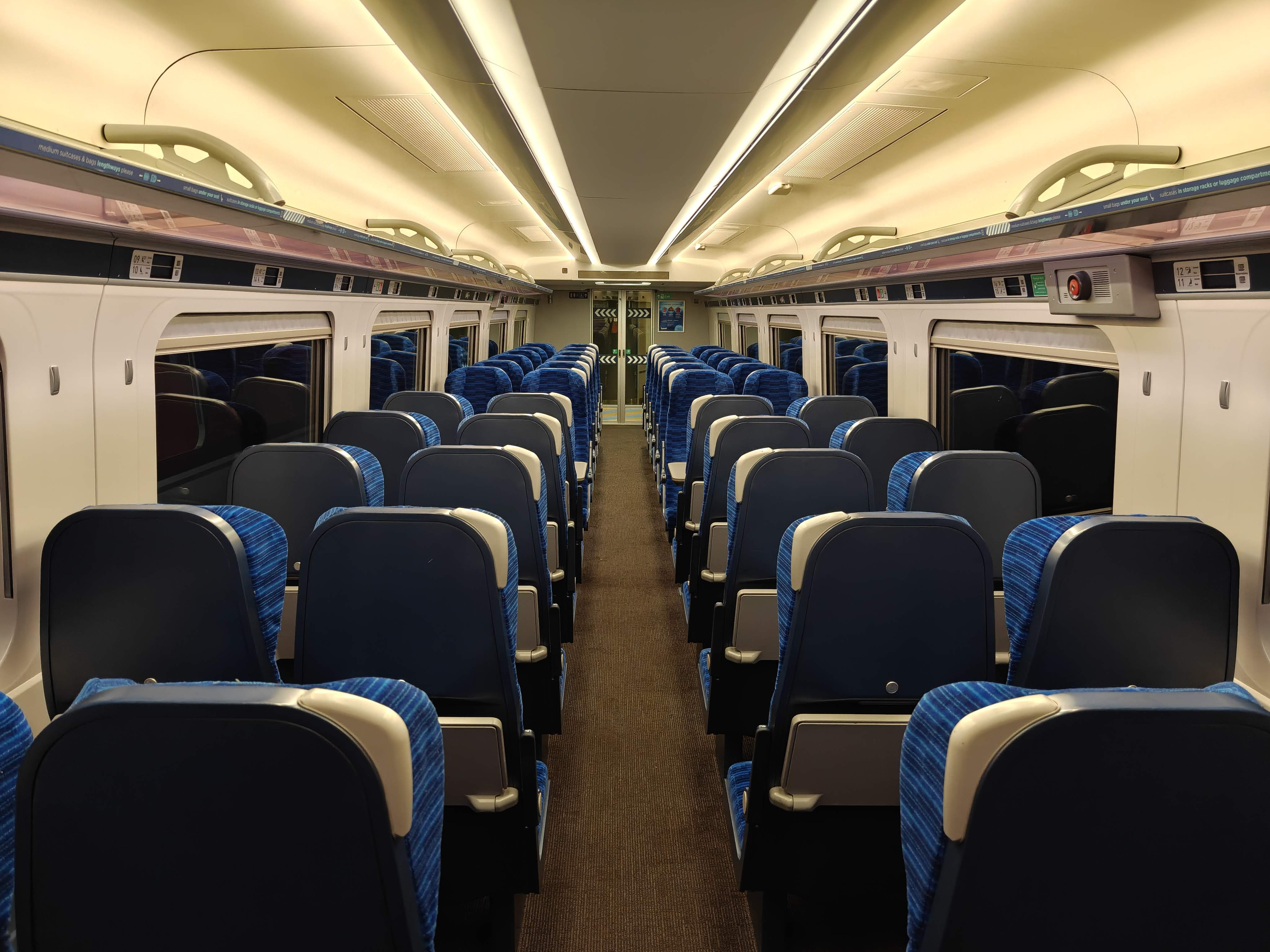
- Interior of a Class 803 unit
- Stock type: Electric multiple unit
- In service: 25 October 2021 – present
- Manufacturer: Hitachi Rail
- Built at: Kasado Works, Kudamatsu, Japan; Newton Aycliffe Manufacturing Facility, England
- Family name: AT300
- Constructed: 2020 – 2021
- Number built: 5
- Number in service: 5
- Formation: 5 cars per unit: DPTS-MS-MS-MS-DPTS
- Fleet numbers: 803001–803005
- Capacity: 402 seats
- Owner: Beacon Rail
- Operator: Lumo
- Depot: Craigentinny (Edinburgh)
- Lines served: East Coast Main Line; Glasgow–Edinburgh via Falkirk line

Specifications
- Car body construction: Aluminium
- Doors: Single-leaf pocket sliding; (2 per side per car)
- Maximum speed: 125 mph (200 km/h)
- Weight: 228.5 t (224.9 long tons; 251.9 short tons)
- Electric system: Overhead line, 25 kV 50 Hz AC
- Current collection: Pantograph
- Braking systems: Electro-pneumatic (disc) and regenerative
- Safety systems: AWS; TPWS
- Multiple working: Within class
- Track gauge: 1,435 mm (4 ft 8 1/2 in) standard gauge

The British Rail Class 803 is a type of electric multiple unit belonging to the Hitachi AT300 family built by Japanese rolling stock manufacturer Hitachi Rail for open-access operator Lumo. Five units, each comprising five cars, have been produced. The class is used to operate passenger services on the East Coast Main Line between London King's Cross and Edinburgh Waverley, then on to Glasgow Queen Street.

== Background ==
In 2015, following an announcement from the Office of Rail and Road that it would be allowing open-access operators to bid for additional rail paths on the East Coast Main Line, FirstGroup submitted a proposal to operate services between London and Edinburgh. Under its plan, First would seek to directly compete with existing road, rail and air services by offering all standard class seating with an average ticket price of approximately £25. The proposal for the new service was approved in May 2016.

In March 2019, First announced that it had signed an agreement with Hitachi to procure a total of five new five-car trains from its A-train product line for its new service. The units are financed by Beacon Rail, with a ten-year maintenance contract. The first body shell arrived at Hitachi's Newton Aycliffe Manufacturing Facility in April 2020.

The first test runs on the national network were held on 26 May 2021, with the class entering public service on Lumo's launch day of 25 October 2021.

== Design ==
While sharing a bodyshell with the previous UK A-train variants, the Class 803 differs in that it has no diesel engines fitted. They are fitted with batteries to enable the train's on-board services to be maintained, in case the primary electrical supplies have failed. Other changes include seating being standard class only, and the lack of a galley area, although catering services are provided through the use of a trolley service. The units also feature air conditioning, power sockets and free Wi-Fi.

Additional luggage racks were added to each train from 2024. Following complaints about stained cloth seat covers, work took place throughout 2025 to reupholster the seats with more durable moquette in a new design.

== Fleet details ==
Subclass	Operator	Qty.	Year built	Cars per unit	Unit nos.
803/0	Lumo	5	2020–2021	5	803001–803005

=== Named units ===
Unit number	Date	Name	Ref.
803 004	13 August 2025	Whisky Express	
803 005	19 May 2023	Proudly from Newcastle the home of Stephenson's Works bicentenary 1823–2023	

== Accidents and incidents ==
On 17 April 2022, a Class 803 passed through a set of points at Peterborough railway station at 75 mph (120 km/h) where there was a speed restriction of 25 mph (40 km/h). Some passengers were thrown from their seats and sustained minor injuries. The Rail Accident Investigation Branch (RAIB) opened an investigation into the incident, its findings were published on 10 July 2023.
