= British Rail Class 810 =

Hitachi bi-mode train

British Rail Class 810 Aurora
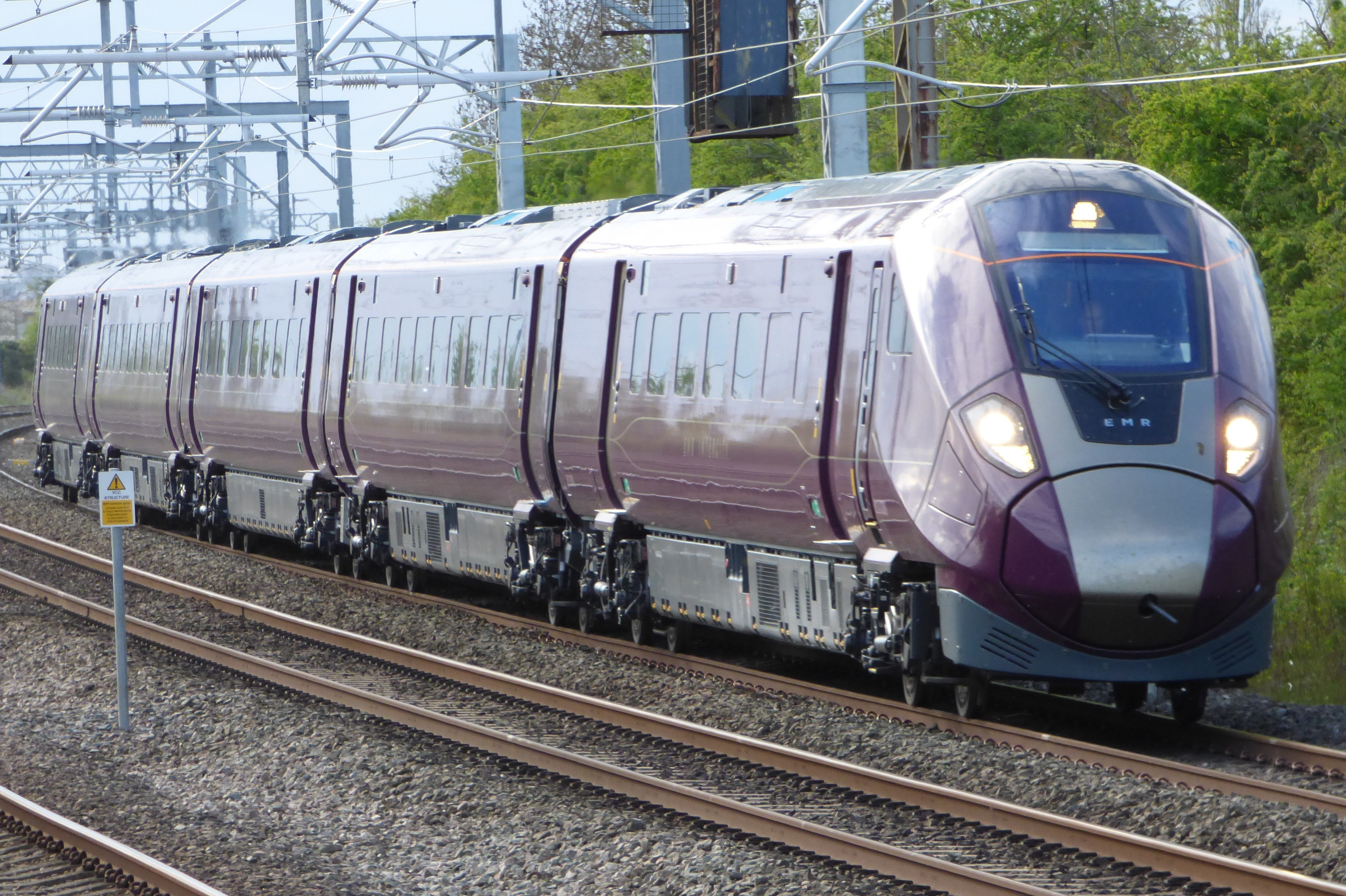
- East Midlands Railway Class 810 on test at Kilby Bridge

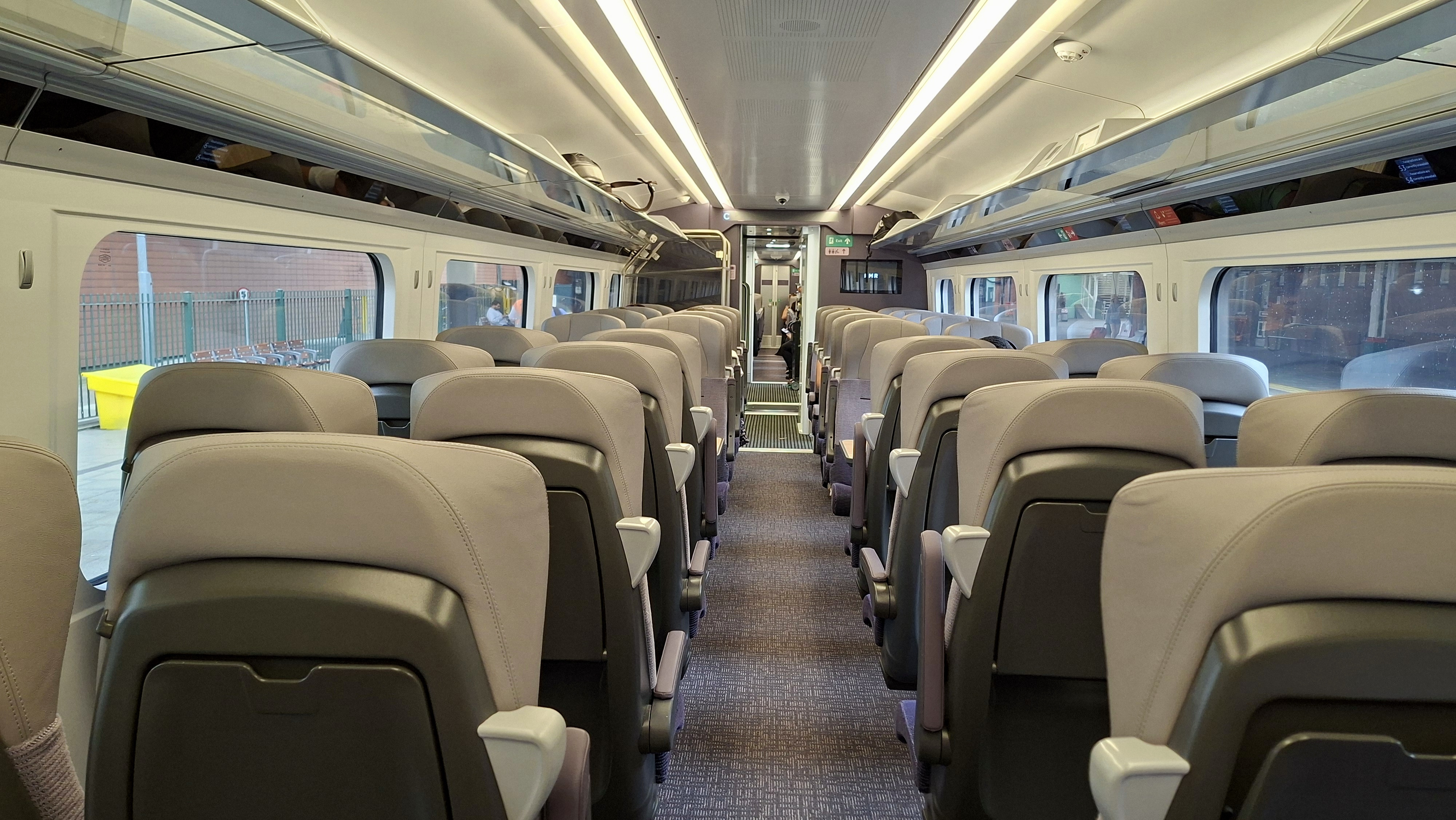
- Standard class interior
- In service: 3 December 2025–present
- Manufacturer: Hitachi Rail
- Built at: Newton Aycliffe Manufacturing Facility, England
- Family name: AT300
- Replaced: Class 222
- Constructed: 2021–present
- Formation: 5 cars per unit: DPTS-MS-TS-MC-DPTF
- Fleet numbers: 810001–810033
- Capacity: 301 seats; (47 first class, 254 standard)
- Owner: Rock Rail
- Operator: East Midlands Railway
- Depot: Derby Etches Park
- Line served: Midland Main Line

Specifications
- Car body construction: Aluminium
- Train length: 120 metres (393 ft 8 in)
- Car length: 24 m (78 ft 9 in)
- Maximum speed: 125 mph (200 km/h)
- Prime mover: 4 × MTU turbo-diesel
- Power output: 735 kW (986 hp) per engine, 2,940 kW (3,940 hp) in total
- Electric system: 25 kV 50 Hz AC overhead
- Current collection: Pantograph
- UIC classification: 2′2′+Bo′Bo′+2′2′+Bo′Bo′+2′2′
- Safety systems: AWS; ETCS; TPWS
- Multiple working: Within class
- Track gauge: 1,435 mm (4 ft 8 1/2 in) standard gauge

The British Rail Class 810 Aurora is a type of bi-mode multiple unit being constructed by Hitachi Rail for East Midlands Railway (EMR). Based on the Hitachi AT300 design, 33 five-car units replaced Class 222 units on EMR's intercity routes following their entry into service in December 2025.

== Background ==
In July 2012, it was announced by Network Rail that the Midland Main Line (MML) would be electrified north of Bedford, allowing the diesel trains currently used on the route to be replaced with new electric trains. However, electrification was 'paused' by Network Rail in June 2015, and then cancelled in July 2017 by then-Secretary of State for Transport, Chris Grayling, who made the decision to use bi-mode trains on the MML instead.

In August 2019, East Midlands Railway placed a £400 million order for 33 five-car bi-mode units, to replace its Class 180 and 222 fleets on the MML. (Note: The Class 810 fleet did not directly replace the Class 180 units, as EMR withdrew them at the May 2023 timetable change, earlier than originally expected.) The purchase is being funded by Rock Rail East Midlands. It was originally planned that the new trains would enter service before December 2022; following multiple delays, the fleet was planned to enter service in early 2025, but this did not happen.

In October 2020, following a public competition, EMR announced the Class 810 units would be branded as Aurora.

In June 2025, having missed the May 2025 timetable change, EMR confirmed that the units would be introduced in "a phased roll-out during 2026" to allow for completion of testing and validation during summer 2025, followed by acceptance and training of drivers and train crew. On 8 August 2025, the first unit was accepted into their fleet following the completion of testing.

On 10 November 2025, EMR confirmed that the first units would enter service in time for the December 2025 timetable change, and the fleet was officially launched on 20 November at a press event at Etches Park depot in Derby.

On 3 December 2025, the first train formed the 07:00 service from Sheffield to London St Pancras.

In 2026, "reliability and maintenance issues" with the new units resulted in a reduction in timetabled train services, and also resulted in the train union RMT announcing plans to strike over perceived safety issues.

== Design ==
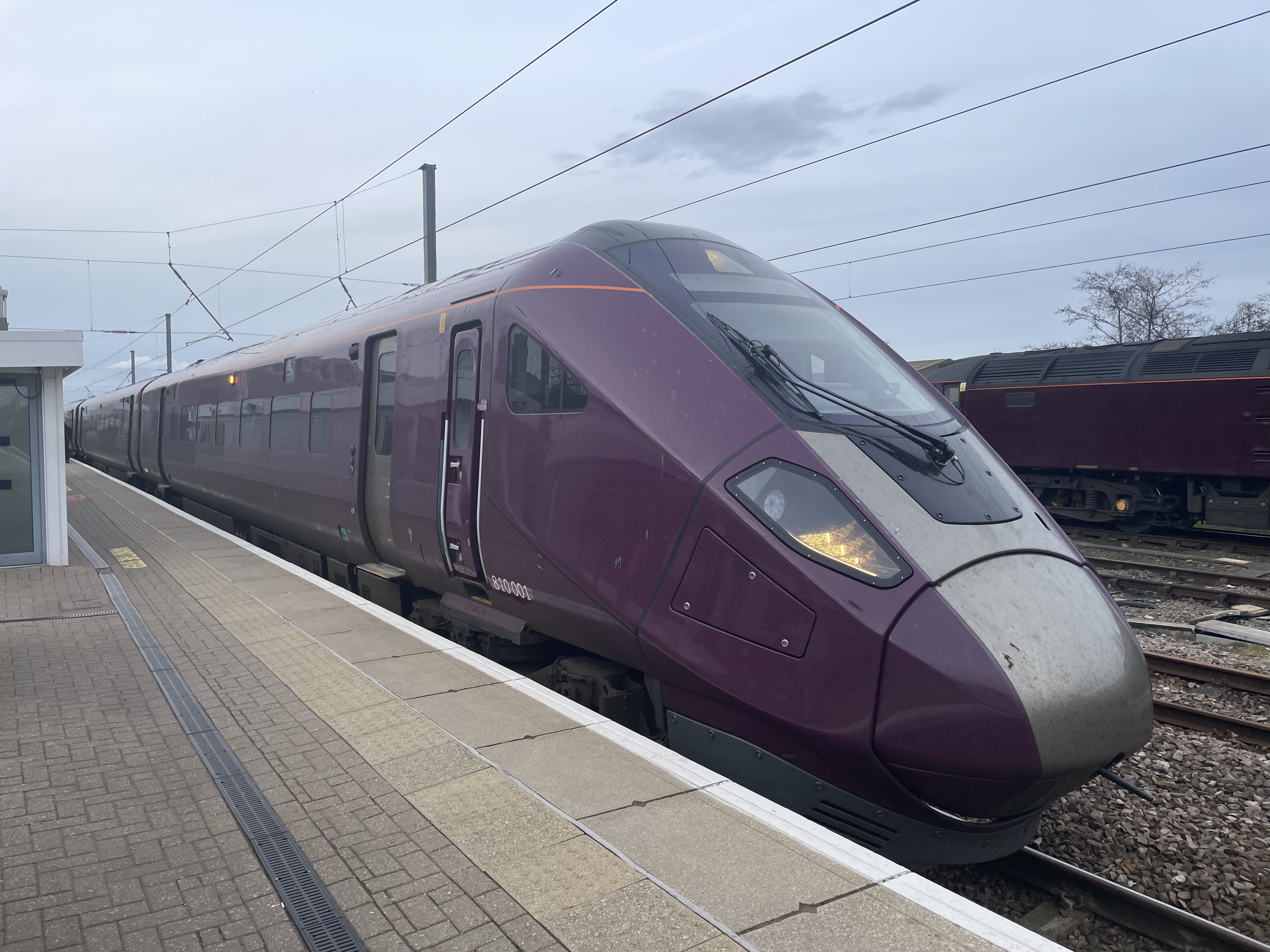
East Midlands Railway Class 810 undergoing testing at Newark Northgate

The Class 810 is a modification of the Class 802 units Hitachi have delivered to a number of British train operators. The major change is a 2-metre (6 ft 7 in) reduction in the length of each vehicle, which is required in order to allow paired (ten-car) Class 810 trains to use London St Pancras station. Some of the length reduction has been achieved by reprofiling the front end of the train and shortening the nose cone.

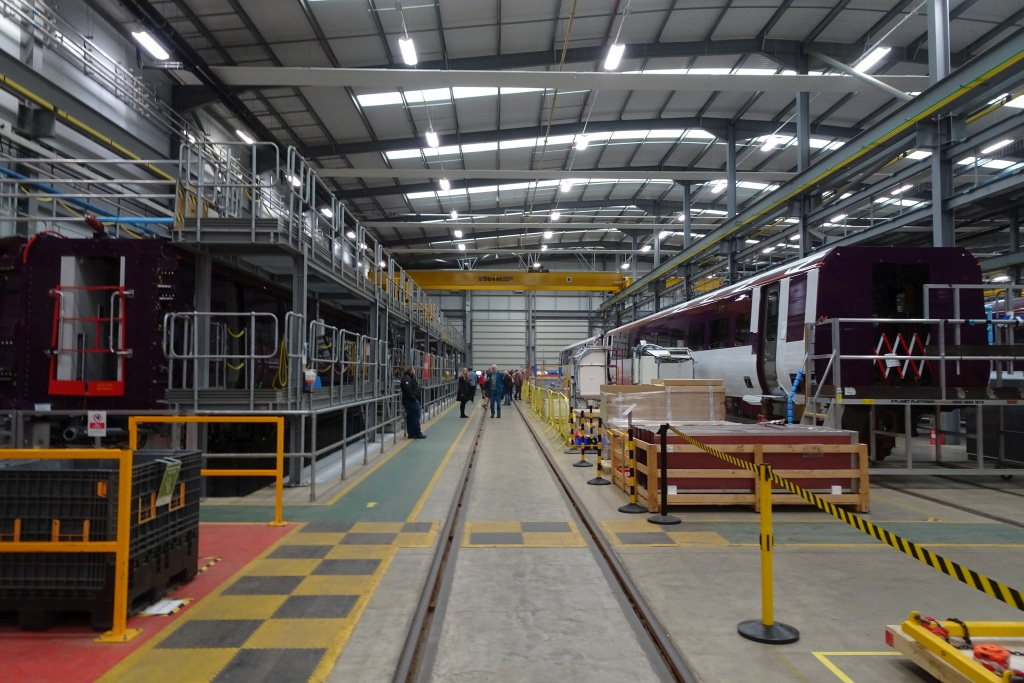
Construction of class 810 units

Compared to Class 802 units, the 810s are fitted with an additional diesel power pack—for a total of four—and each engine is uprated from 700 to 735 kW (939 to 986 hp). Both of these changes are intended to satisfy the franchise requirement that the new trains equal or exceed the performance of the current Class 222 units. The power packs are installed under the first, second, fourth, and fifth vehicles, while the third (centre) vehicle carries the high-voltage transformer. A total of eight 290 kW (390 hp) traction motors are fitted to four bogies on the second and fourth cars.

== Interior ==
In response to customer feedback regarding seating comfort on earlier Class 80x units, both first- and standard-class seats on the Class 810 are of a unique design that is intended to offer enhanced comfort. They are based on the existing FISA Lean design, but of an altered appearance. EMR worked closely with Derby-based design company DGDESIGN on the design of the new interiors. It is claimed that the seats have wider cushions, more-sculpted headrests, softer and deeper armrests, additional privacy screening, and be upholstered in a wool-rich moquette that is intended to be easier to keep clean. Every passenger has access to power sockets and USB charging points, at-seat coat hooks, and storage space under each seat.

== Accidents and incidents ==
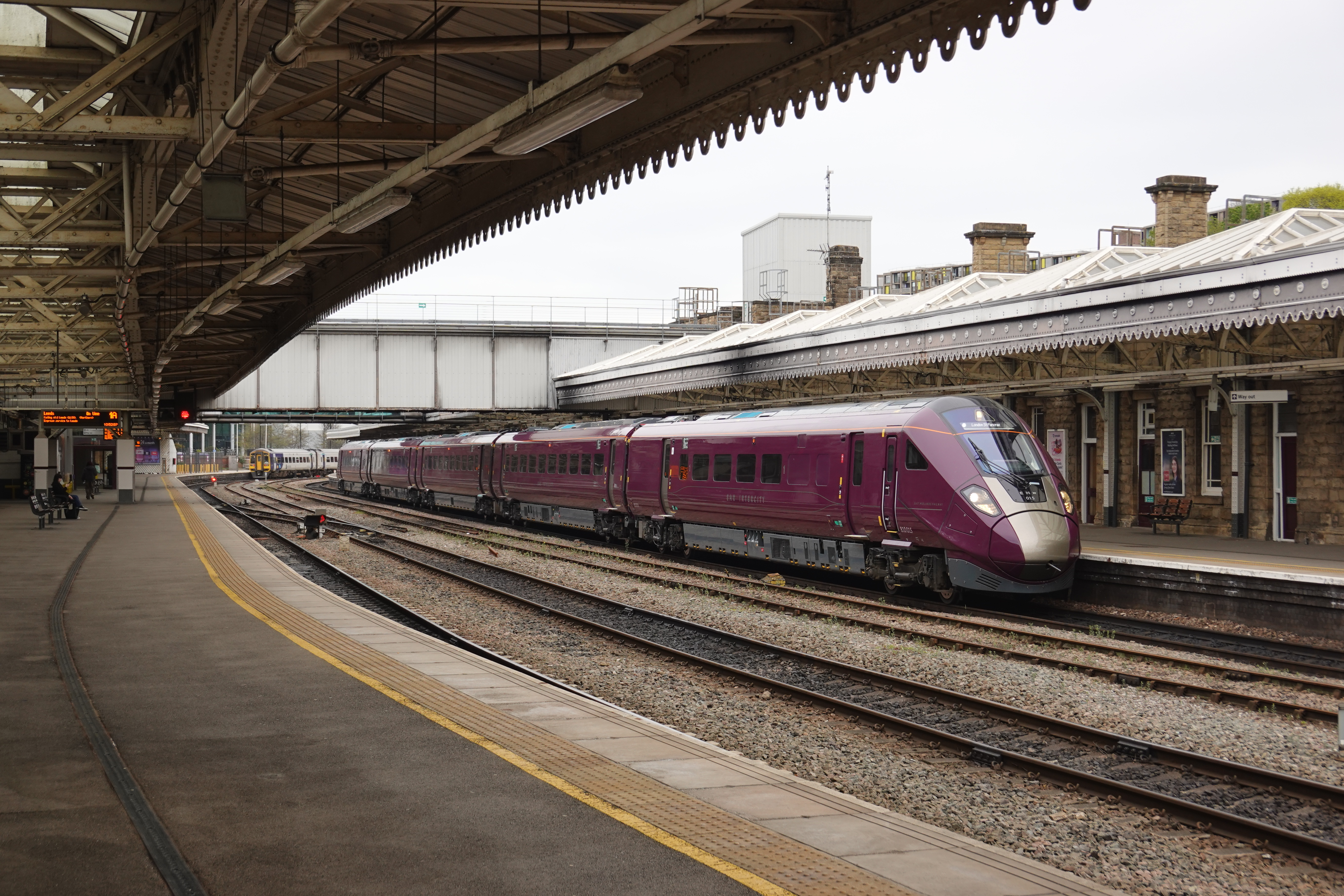
Class 810 awaiting departure at Sheffield

On 19 June 2026 at approximately 17:15, EMR unit 810015 was involved in a collision with an EMR Class 360 south of Bedford. The collision involved the stationary Class 810 unit, operating the 15:50 EMR service from Nottingham bound for London St Pancras International, being hit from behind by the 16:40 Luton Airport Express service from Corby to St Pancras.

== Fleet details ==
Class	Operator	Qty.	Year built	Cars per unit	Unit nos.
810	East Midlands Railway	33	2021–present	5	810001–810033
