= East Coast =

East Coast or east coast may refer to:

== Entertainment ==
- East Coast hip hop, a subgenre of hip hop
- "East Coast" (ASAP Ferg song), 2017
- "East Coast" (Saves the Day song), 2004
- East Coast FM, a radio station in Co. Wicklow, Ireland
- East Coast Swing, a form of social partner dance

== Places ==
- The east coast of Australia, particularly:
  - Australian south-east coast drainage division, an area of southern Australia
  - Eastern states of Australia
- The east coast of Canada, particularly:
  - Atlantic Canada, New Brunswick, Prince Edward Island, Nova Scotia, and Newfoundland and Labrador
  - Eastern Canada (by extension of the above)
- The east coast of India, particularly:
  - Coromandel Coast, southeastern India
  - Eastern Coastal Plains
- The east coast of Peninsular Malaysia
- The east coast of New Zealand, particularly:
  - Gisborne District, area of New Zealand referred to as the East Coast
  - East Coast (New Zealand electorate)
- The east coast of Singapore, organized as its East Region
  - East Coast Group Representation Constituency, an electoral division in Singapore
- The east coast of Spain, known as Levante
- The East Coast of the United States
- East Coast, a district in Sarmi Regency, Papua, Indonesia

== Transportation ==
- East Coast (train operating company), 2009 to 2015 UK railway company
- East Coast Buses, a subsidiary of Lothian Buses in Scotland
- East Coast Greenway, biking and walking route in U.S.
- East Coast Main Line, major UK railway line
- Virgin Trains East Coast, 2015 to 2018 UK railway company, now LNER
- East Coast Parkway, an expressway on the southeastern coast of Singapore
- East Coast Railway Zone (India), one of the sixteen railway zones of Indian Railways
- Florida East Coast Railway, a Class II railroad operating in the US state of Florida
- Lumo (train operating company), train company in the United Kingdom formerly known as East Coast Trains
- New Brunswick East Coast Railway, a historic Canadian railway that operated in New Brunswick

== Other ==
- East coast akalat, a small passerine bird native to the east coast of Africa
- East Coast bias, the bias towards news and sport from the East Coast in American media
- East Coast Borough Council, proposed renaming of the Ards and North Down Borough Council, Northern Ireland, UK
- East Coast of Africa Station, a former position in the British Navy
