= British Rail Class 807 =

Hitachi electric train

British Rail Class 807 Evero
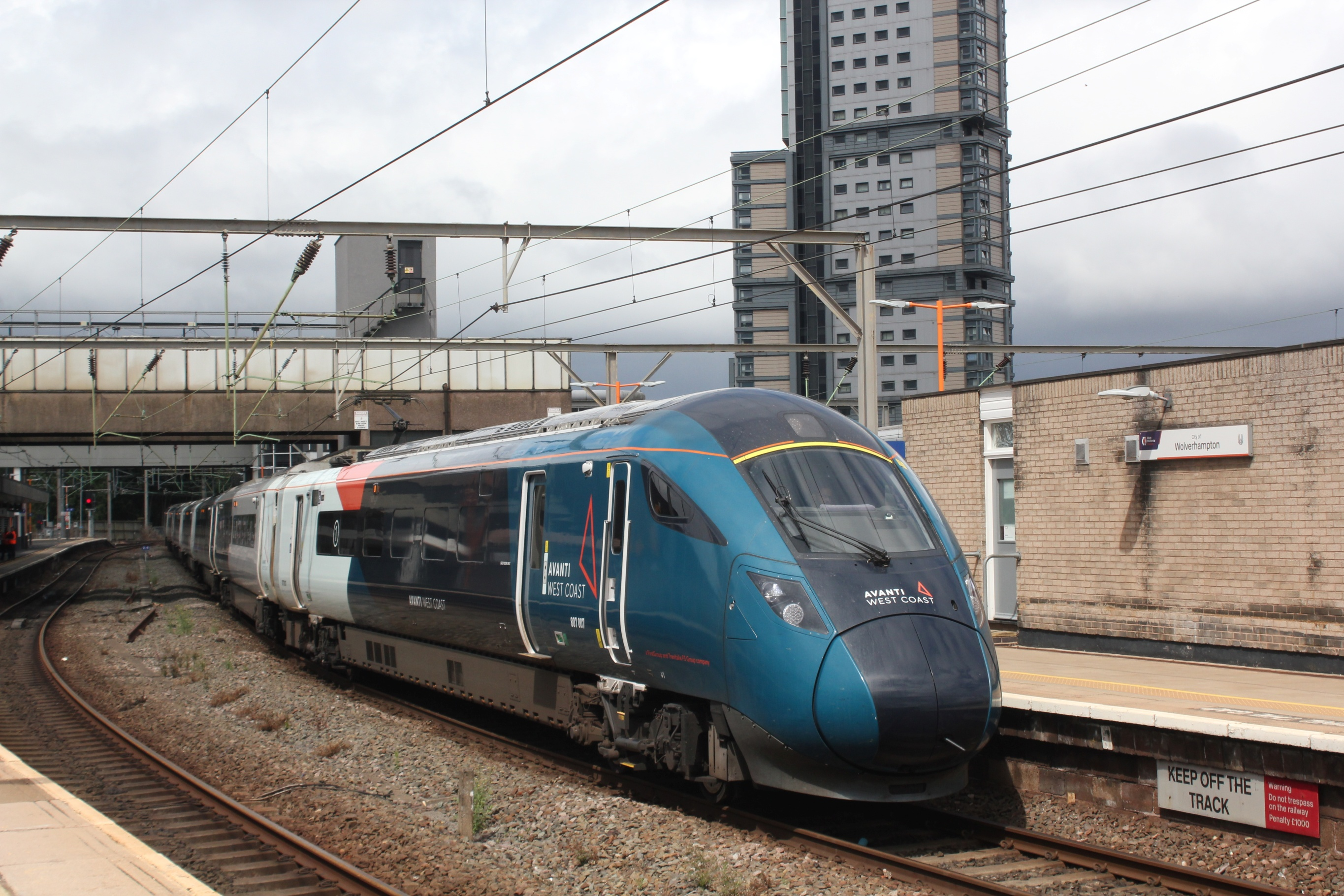
- Avanti West Coast Class 807 at Wolverhampton

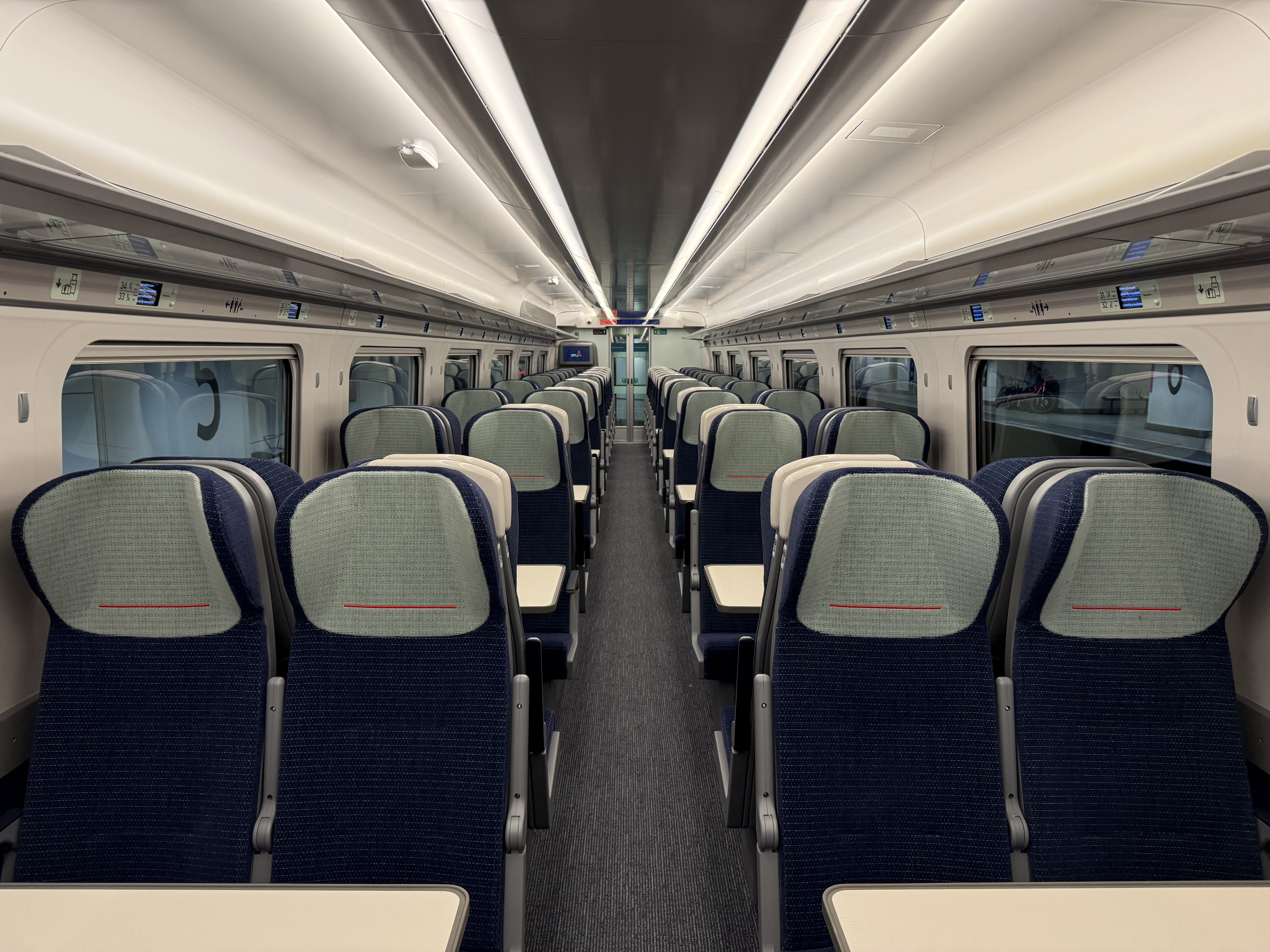
- Standard class interior of a Class 807 unit
- Stock type: Electric multiple unit
- In service: 26 October 2024-present
- Manufacturer: Hitachi Rail
- Built at: Kasado Works, Kudamatsu, Japan; Newton Aycliffe Manufacturing Facility, England
- Family name: AT300
- Replaced: Class 221 (Avanti West Coast)
- Constructed: 2021–2025
- Entered service: 2024
- Number built: 10
- Number in service: 10
- Formation: 7 cars per unit - DPTS-MS-MS-TS-MS-MC-DPTF
- Fleet numbers: 807001–807010
- Capacity: 453 seats (49 first-class, 404 standard)
- Owner: Rock Rail West Coast
- Operator: Avanti West Coast
- Depot: Oxley (Wolverhampton)
- Lines served: West Coast Main Line; Blackpool North Line

Specifications
- Car body construction: Aluminium
- Train length: 182 metres (597 ft)
- Car length: 26 m (85 ft 4 in)
- Maximum speed: 125 mph (200 km/h)
- Power output: 226 kW per motor
- Electric system: 25 kV 50 Hz AC overhead
- Current collection: Pantograph
- UIC classification: 2′2′+Bo′Bo′+Bo′Bo′+2′2′+Bo′Bo′+Bo′Bo′+2′2′
- Track gauge: 1,435 mm (4 ft 8 1/2 in) standard gauge

The British Rail Class 807 Evero is a type of electric multiple unit belonging to the Hitachi AT300 family, wihch were built by Hitachi Rail for train operator Avanti West Coast. Based on the Hitachi A-train design, a total of 10 seven-car units have been produced.

== History ==
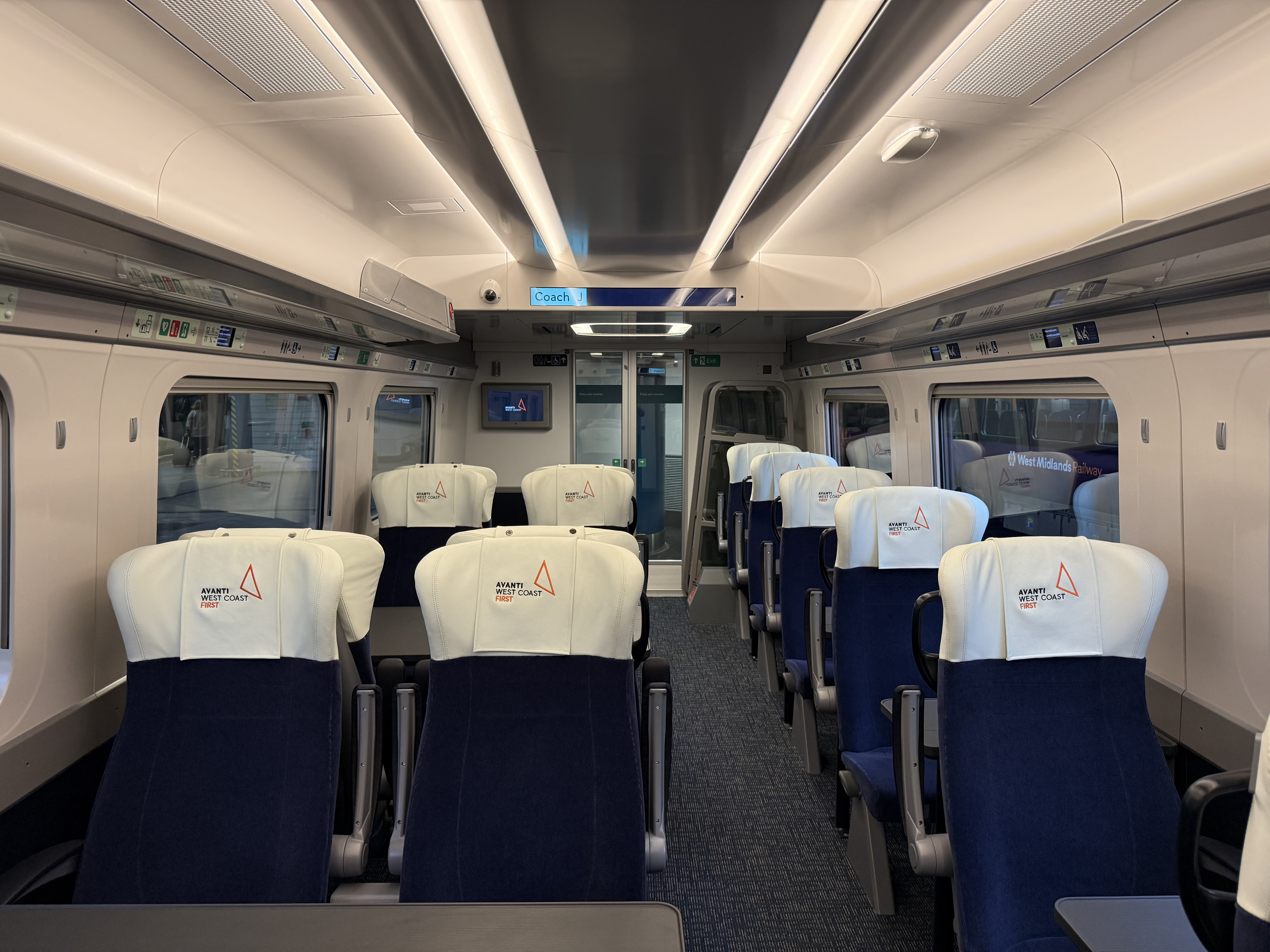
The First Class interior of a Class 807.

In December 2019, Avanti West Coast placed an order for 10 seven-car electric units which were to replace its Class 221 fleet, along with 13 Class 805 bi-mode units as part of £350 million contract with Hitachi Rail. All units were scheduled to be in service by 2023, but this was later pushed back to 2024. The first unit entered service in late 2024. The trains are financed by ROSCO Rock Rail West Coast, a joint venture between Rock Rail and Standard Life Aberdeen. The trains are maintained by a joint team of Alstom and Hitachi staff, alongside the Class 805, at Oxley depot near Wolverhampton.

Features promised include free Wi-Fi, at-seat wireless inductive charging for electronic devices, 230 V and USB sockets, a catering offer and a real-time passenger information system that can advise of connecting rail services.

== Construction and entry to service ==
Construction of the Class 807 in the UK commenced on 7 July 2020. The aluminium shells arrived after being shipped from Hitachi's Kasado plant in Japan. Final production commenced at Hitachi's Newton Aycliffe facility. Out of the 135 bodyshells, 56 were manufactured in the UK.

Static testing began in June 2022. The trains were planned to enter service in 2023, but this did not occur. In the end, Avanti West Coast accepted the first two Class 807s in July 2024. The first train entered service on 26 October 2024 as a soft launch. Avanti West Coast first ran the Class 807s in passenger service between Liverpool Lime Street and London Euston in November 2024.

== Fleet details ==
Ten Class 807s have been built.

Class	Operator	Qty.	Year built	Cars per unit	Unit nos.
807	Avanti West Coast	10	2021–2025	7	807001–807010

=== Named trains ===
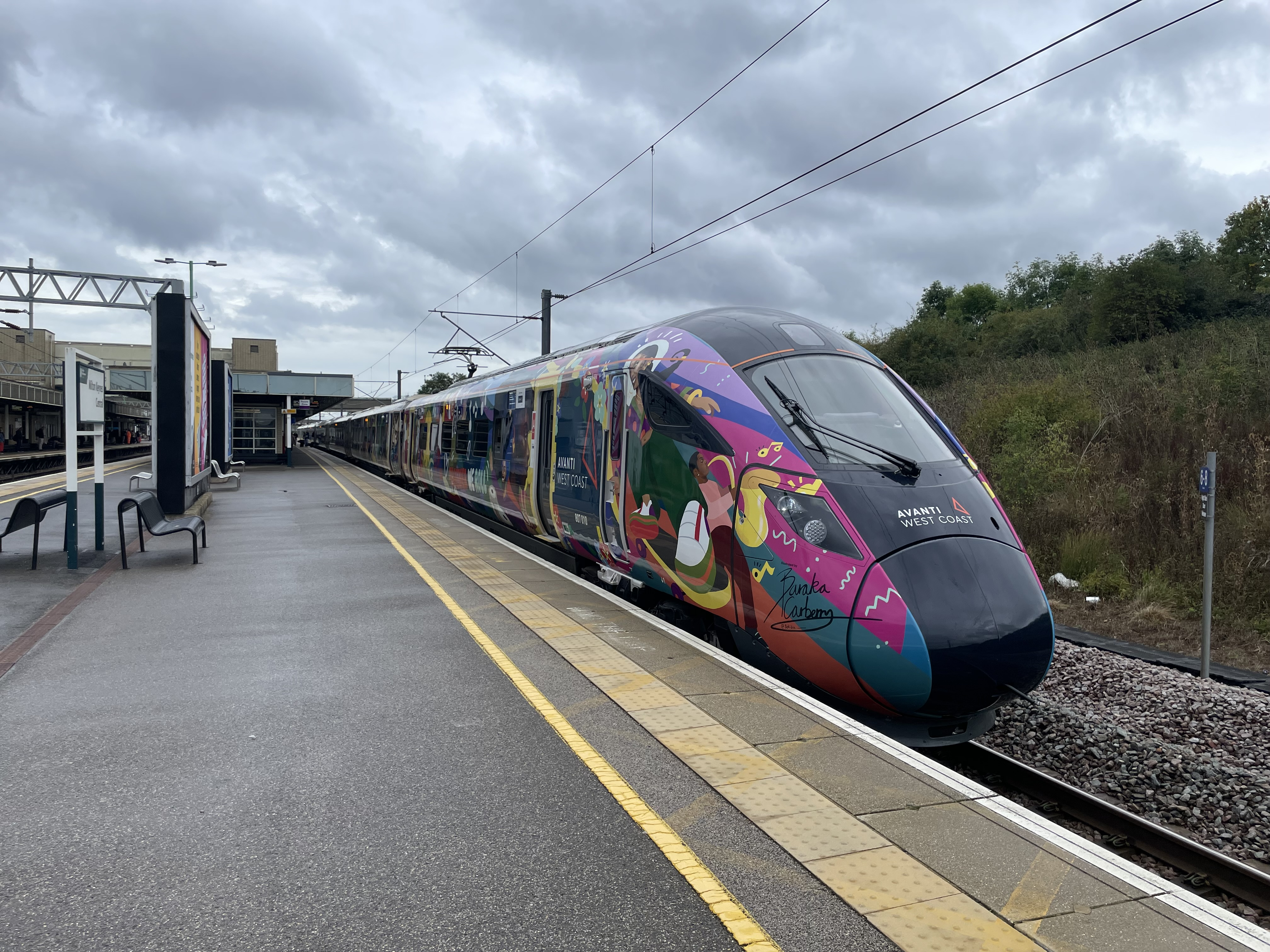
Unit 807010 named Legacy at Milton Keynes Central Station. This unit carries the "Together We Roll" livery across all seven carriages.

Class 807 units with special names or liveries
Unit number	Date	Name	Notes
807010	9 February 2026	Legacy	Created by digital artist, Baraka Carberry. Carries "Together We Roll" vinyls on all seven carriages for Avanti West Coast Diversity.
