= British Rail Class 805 =

Hitachi bi-mode train

British Rail Class 805 Evero
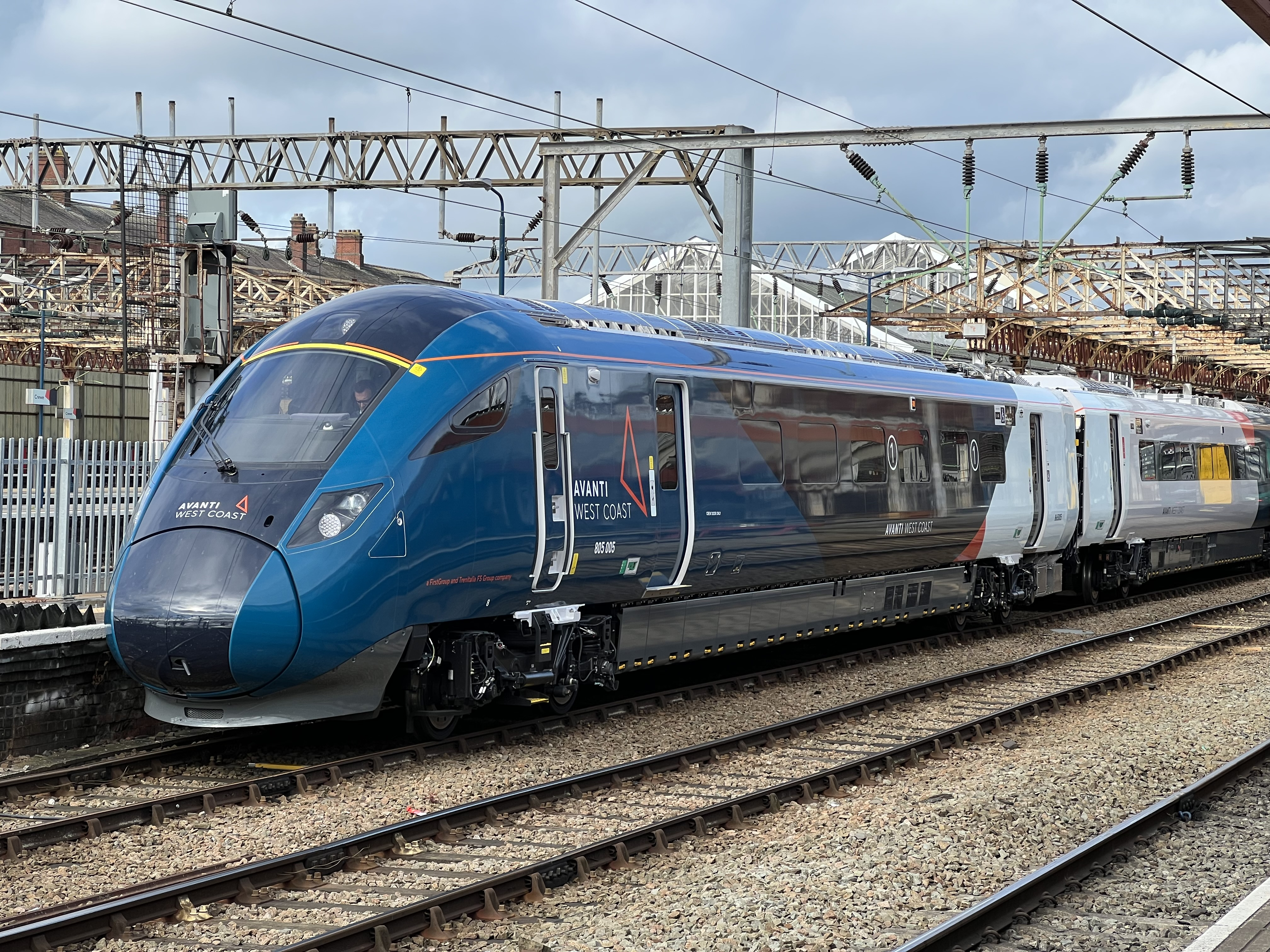
- Avanti West Coast Class 805 at Crewe

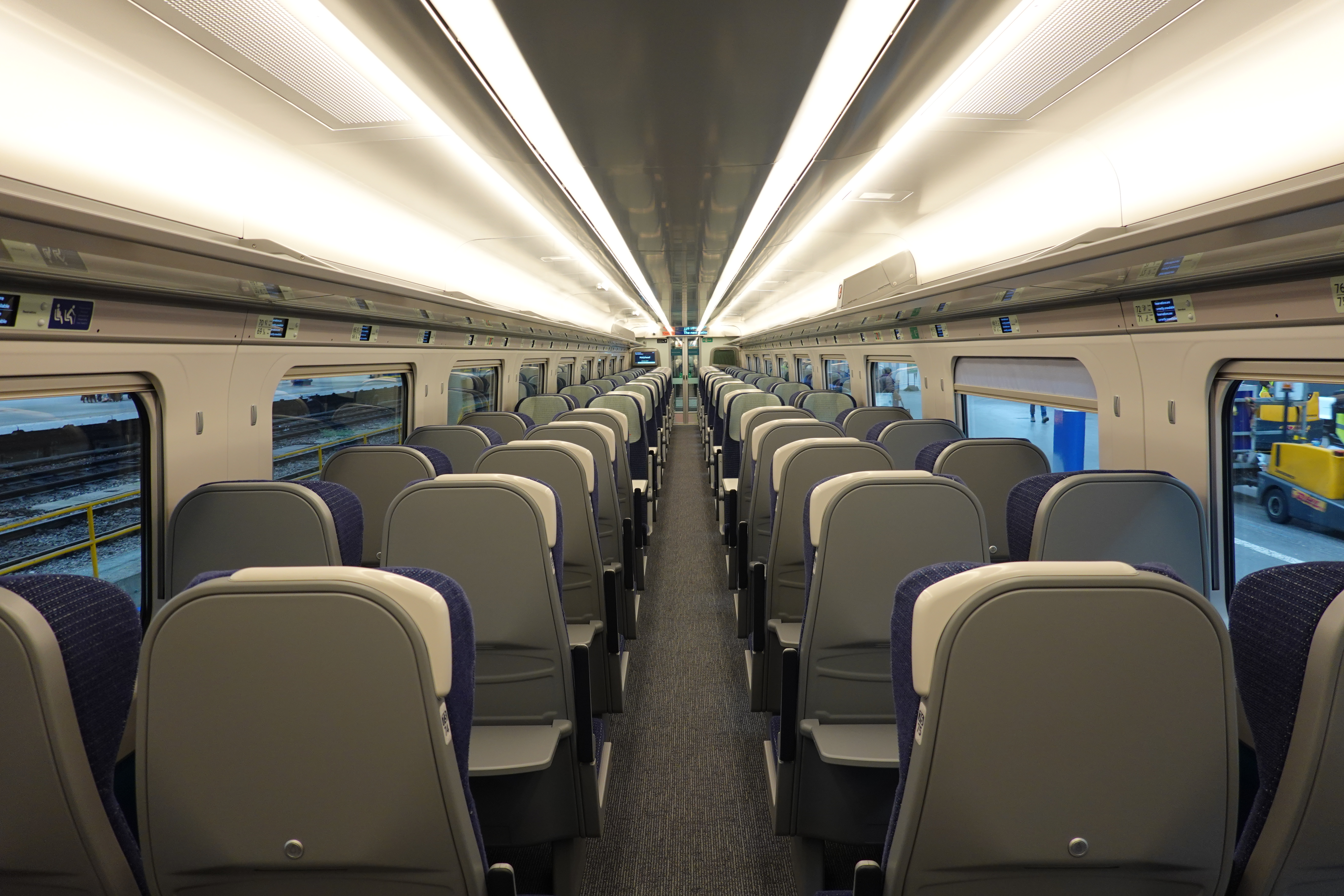
- Standard class interior of a Class 805 unit
- In service: 2 June 2024 – present
- Manufacturer: Hitachi Rail
- Built at: Kasado Works, Kudamatsu, Japan; Newton Aycliffe Manufacturing Facility, County Durham, United Kingdom
- Family name: AT300
- Replaced: Class 221 (Avanti West Coast)
- Constructed: 2021–2024
- Number built: 13
- Number in service: 13
- Formation: 5 cars per unit
- Fleet numbers: 805001–805013
- Capacity: 299 seats (25 first-class, 274 standard), and 2 wheelchair spaces
- Owner: Rock Rail
- Operator: Avanti West Coast
- Depot: Oxley (Wolverhampton)
- Lines served: West Coast Main Line; North Wales Main Line; Blackpool North Line

Specifications
- Car body construction: Aluminium
- Car length: 26 m (85 ft 4 in)
- Maximum speed: 125 mph (200 km/h)
- Engine type: 4-stroke V12 turbo-diesel
- Electric system: Overhead line, 25 kV 50 Hz AC
- Current collection: Pantograph
- Track gauge: 1,435 mm (4 ft 8 1/2 in) standard gauge

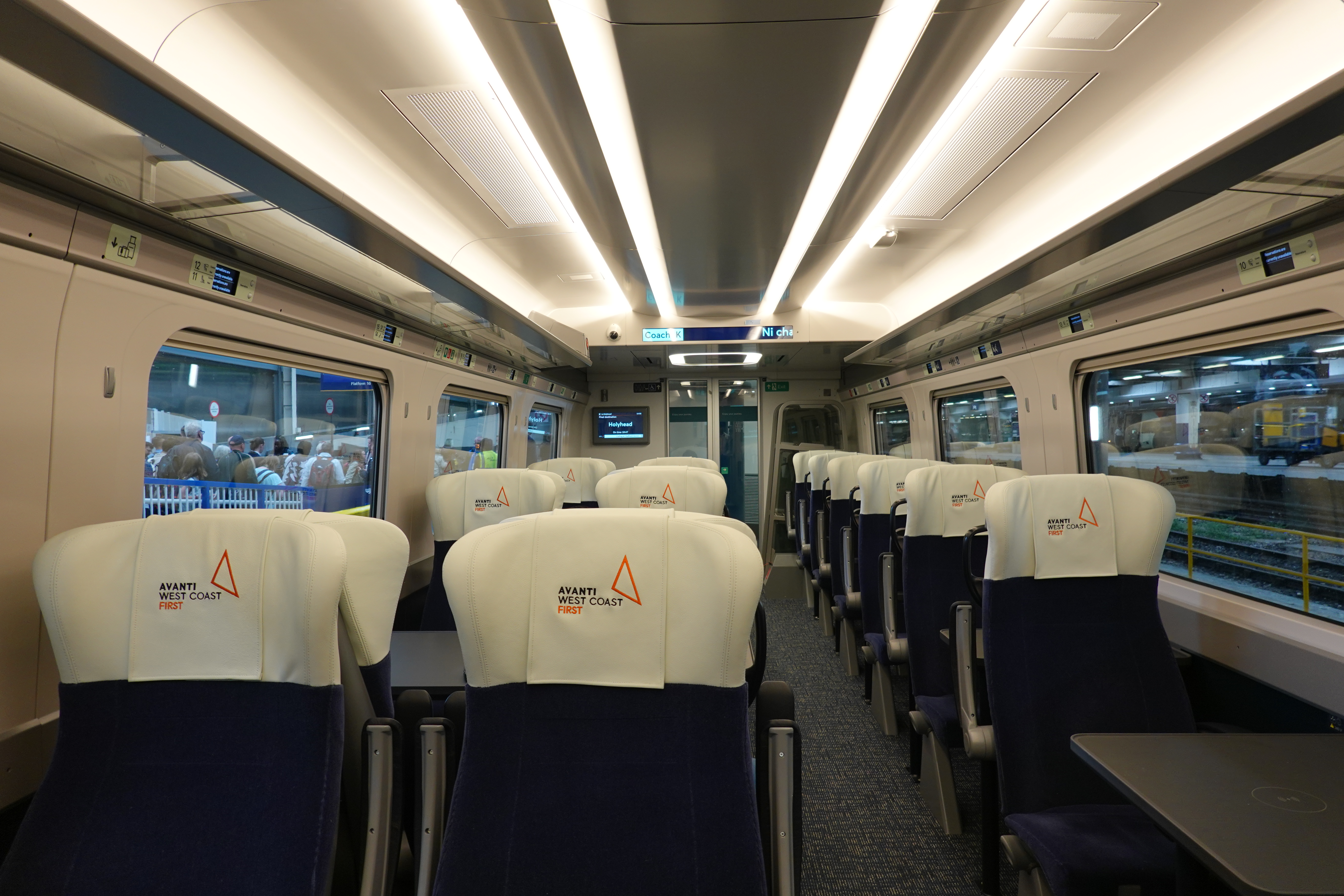
First class interior of a Class 805 unit

The British Rail Class 805 Evero is a type of bi-mode multiple unit built by Hitachi Rail for Avanti West Coast. Part of the Hitachi AT300 family, 13 five-car units were built to replace Class 221s on services between London Euston, Birmingham New Street, Chester and stations on the North Wales Coast lines. Their introduction allowed the elimination of long-distance diesel working on electrified routes.

== History ==
In December 2019, Avanti West Coast placed an order for 13 five-car bi-mode units to replace its Class 221 fleet, along with 10 Class 807 electric units, as part of £350 million contract with Hitachi Rail. All were originally scheduled to be in service by 2023. Financing of this rolling stock was handled by Rock Rail West Coast, a joint venture between Rock Rail and Standard Life Aberdeen. The trains will be maintained by a joint team of Alstom and Hitachi staff, alongside the Class 807, at Oxley depot near Wolverhampton.

Passenger facilities promised include free Wi-Fi, at-seat wireless inductive charging for electronic devices, 230 V sockets and USB sockets, a catering offer and a real-time passenger information system that can advise of connecting rail services.

In June 2022, static testing commenced at Newton Aycliffe and dynamic testing followed in November. Main line testing of the Class 805 commenced in February 2023, while the type's introduction into service originally planned for later that same year. However, this was put back to Summer 2024. On 2 June 2024, the Class 805 entered regular service.

In August 2024, the Office of Rail and Road (ORR) issued an improvement notice to Avanti West Coast regarding the operation of the newly-introduced Class 805 fleet, having determined its lack of an automatic speed supervision system (which was present on the preceding Class 221 fleet) to be in breach of legislation. Compliance with the improvement notice would require all Class 805s to be retrofitted with continuous speed supervision; if this functionality necessitates additional hardware, such work could be quite costly to implement. In response, Avanti West Coast filed an appeal against the improvement notice.

The Class 805 replaces the diesel-only Class 221 Voyager trains, which finished service in December 2024 and were transferred to CrossCountry.

== Fleet details ==
Class	Operator	Qty.	Year built	Cars per unit	Unit nos.
805	Avanti West Coast	13	2021–2024	5	805001–805013
