= Avanti West Coast =

British train operating company

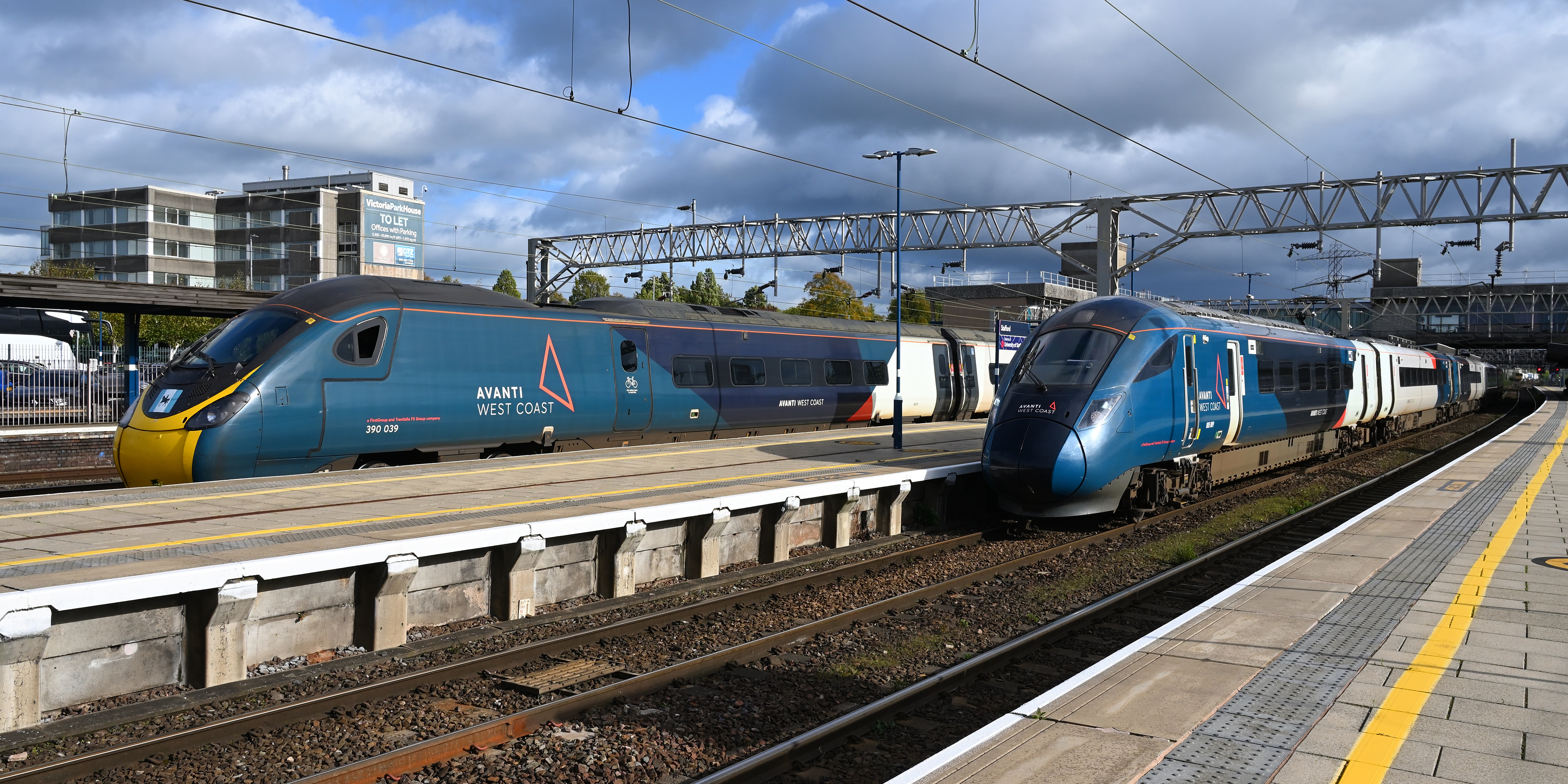
- Class 390 Pendolino and a Class 805 Evero at Stafford

Overview
- Franchise: West Coast Partnership
- Main regions: Greater London; North West England; Scotland; South East England; West Midlands
- Other regions: East Midlands; East of England; Wales
- Fleet: Class 390 Pendolino; Class 805 Evero; Class 807 Evero
- Stations operated: 16
- Parent company: FirstGroup (70%); Trenitalia (30%)
- Headquarters: London
- Reporting mark: VT (Note: Reporting mark inherited from Virgin Trains, the operator of the franchise prior to Avanti.)
- Dates of operation: 8 December 2019–7 March 2027
- Predecessor: Virgin Trains

Technical
- Length: 1,310 km (810 miles)

Other
- Website: www.avantiwestcoast.co.uk
Route map
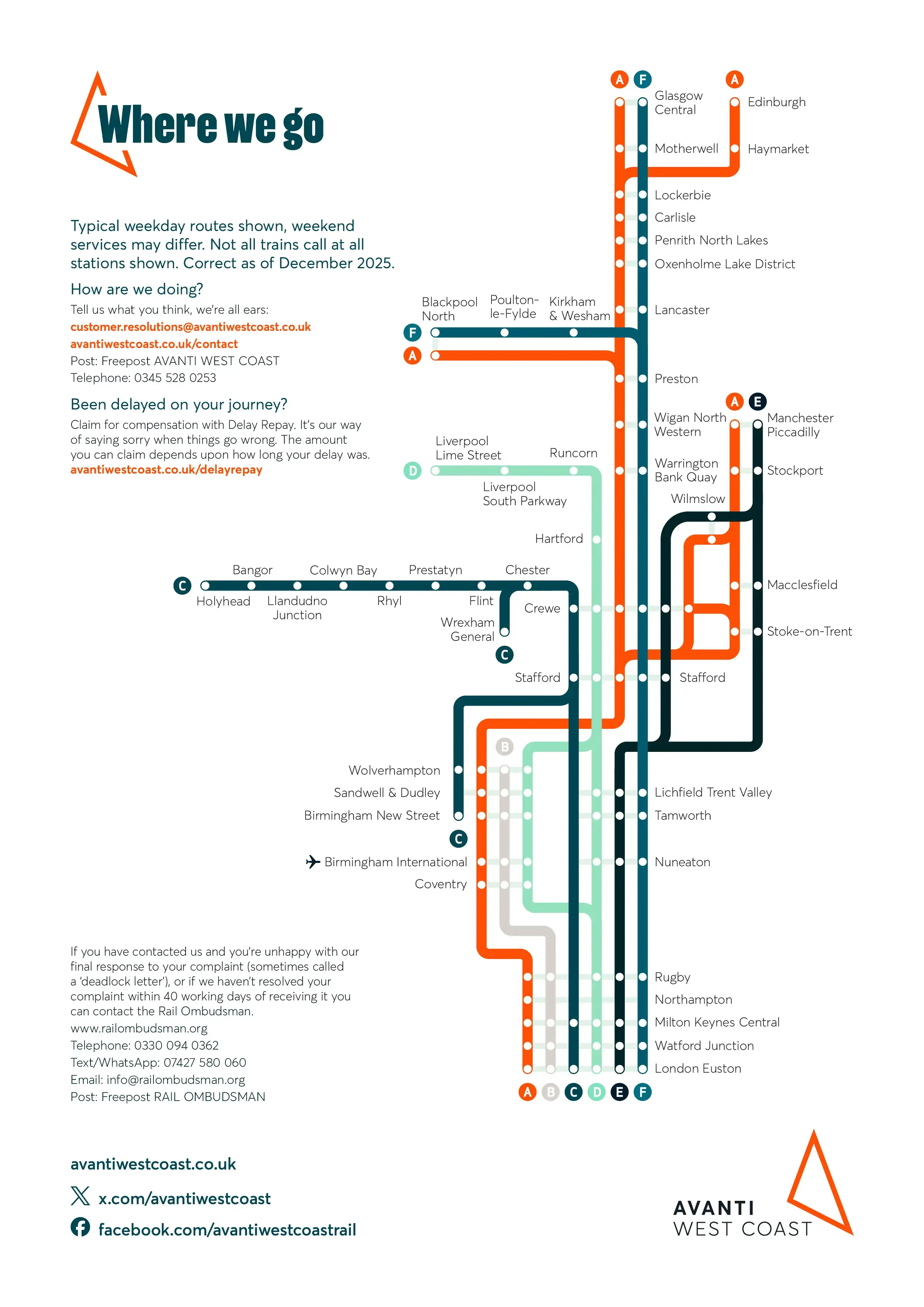

First Trenitalia West Coast Rail, trading as Avanti West Coast, is a British train operating company that operates the West Coast Partnership franchise. The company is owned by FirstGroup (70%) and Trenitalia (30%).

Avanti West Coast provides the principal long-distance passenger services on the West Coast Main Line between London, the West Midlands, North West England, North Wales and Scotland. Its services connect six of the largest cities in the UK – London, Birmingham, Liverpool, Manchester, Glasgow, and Edinburgh – which have a combined metropolitan population of over 18 million.

Avanti West Coast began services in December 2019, at which time it inherited 56 Class 390 Pendolino high-speed electric multiple units and 20 Class 221 Super Voyager diesel-electric multiple units from Virgin Trains. The 390s underwent major refurbishment between 2021 and 2024, and in 2024 the 221s were replaced with new Class 805 Evero bi-mode multiple units and Class 807 Evero electric multiple units.

Avanti West Coast is scheduled to return to public ownership on 7 March 2027 as part of the formation of Great British Railways.

== History ==
=== Background ===
In November 2016, the Department for Transport (DfT) announced that the InterCity West Coast franchise, which was held by Virgin Trains from 1997 to 2019, would be superseded by the West Coast Partnership (WCP). The principal change of the WCP was the inclusion of the High Speed 2 (HS2) services, then envisioned to start around 2026. Accordingly, the DfT required that bidders have experience in operating high-speed trains and the associated infrastructure, which led to all tendering parties either being, or partnering with, an existing high-speed operator.

In June 2017, the DfT announced that three consortia had been shortlisted to bid for the franchise:

- FirstGroup (70%) / Trenitalia (30%)
- MTR Corporation (75%) / Guangshen Railway Company (25%)
- Stagecoach (50%) / SNCF (30%) / Virgin Group (20%)

In December 2018, the Spanish state-owned company Renfe Operadora joined the MTR-led bid. In April 2019, the incumbent Stagecoach-led bid was disqualified after it had proposed significant changes to the commercial terms, specially in regards to staff pensions. Stagecoach disputed its disqualification and launched a legal challenge to have it overturned. On 17 June 2020, the High Court ruled against the company, deciding that the decision had been lawful.

In August 2019, the DfT awarded the franchise to the First Trenitalia consortium with Avanti West Coast to commence operations on 8 December 2019. The Competition and Markets Authority (CMA) launched a merger inquiry into the award of the franchise following a referral from the European Commission. In November 2019, Avanti West Coast was formally announced as the name of the new InterCity West Coach Rail franchise at a special event in Birmingham. The following month, the CMA approved the franchise's award; concerns that limited competition on some routes could lead to higher fares and less availability of cheaper tickets were offset by the agreement of price caps to be present in some regions.

Avanti West Coast promised retiring diesel Voyager trains by 2022, Wi-Fi improvements, and adding 263 weekly train services. Avanti unveiled their orange triangle logo, representing the three geographic points of the West Coast Main Line. Virgin Trains tickets were accepted as valid fare for another 24 weeks after Saturday, 7 December 2019.

=== Strikes and train cancellations (2022–2024); contract extensions and nationalisation ===
Services were curtailed in 2020 due to a decline of passenger travel and staffing shortages during the COVID-19 pandemic.

The DfT produced an Emergency Measures Agreement (EMA) and then in September 2020, an Emergency Recovery Measures Agreement (ERMA), which extended Avanti West Coast's contract until 1 April 2031.

Avanti West Coast was impacted by the 2022–2024 United Kingdom railway strikes, the first national rail strike in the UK for three decades. Its workers were amongst those who voted to take industrial action due a dispute over pay and working conditions. In response, the company appealed for the general public to avoid the railways for non-essential travel on the affected dates of 21, 23, and 25 June 2022, as only a minimal service could be run due to the number of staff choosing not to work. On 29 June 2022, Avanti West Coast's staff voted in favour of further strikes.

Between 14 August and 18 September 2022, Avanti West Coast reduced its timetable, citing unofficial strike action from its employees. However, this allegation was disputed by Aslef. In August 2022, the Mayor of Greater Manchester, Andy Burnham, expressed his frustration at Avanti West Coast and explained his intention to ask the then Prime Minister, Boris Johnson, to rescind the Avanti West Coast franchise. In September 2022, the CEO of Avanti West Coast resigned amid the timetable controversy.

In October 2022, the UK Government extended Avanti's contract for six months but stated "drastic improvements" were necessary.

According to figures released by the Office of Rail and Road on 12 November 2022, Avanti West Coast had the worst record of train cancellations in the year prior to this date. The average cancellation rate in Great Britain was 3.8%, while Avanti West Coast's rate was 8%.

In March 2023, the Avanti West Coast contract was extended by six months to expire on 15 October 2023. On 19 September 2023, DfT extended the contract, starting on 15 October 2023, with a core term of three years (to 18 October 2026) and a maximum term of nine years (to 17 October 2032). At that time, the DfT said that Avanti-caused cancellations were consistently below 3% since March 2023.

In December 2024, it was announced that Avanti West Coast would be nationalised as part of the abolition of passenger rail franchising in Great Britain; however, it and CrossCountry would be the two last operators to be nationalised due to poor performance. Avanti West Coast is expected to be nationalised on 7 March 2027 prior to the formation of Great British Railways.

== Services ==
Avanti West Coast currently operates the same services as Virgin Trains did on the West Coast Main Line before 2019.

In November 2019, before services commenced, it was anticipated that, from December 2022, an additional 263 train services would be run every week.

In February 2021, Avanti West Coast launched smartcard ticketing as a more convenient and environmentally-friendly alternative to traditional paper tickets.

=== Routes ===
As of May 2026, Avanti West Coast weekday regular intercity routes in trains per hour (tph) / day (tpd) are as follows:

Route A – London - North West and Scotland via Birmingham
Route	tpd	Calling at
London Euston to Glasgow Central via Birmingham New Street	6	Coventry, Birmingham International, Birmingham New Street, Sandwell & Dudley, Wolverhampton, Stafford, Crewe, Warrington Bank Quay, Wigan North Western, Preston, Lancaster, Oxenholme Lake District (3 tpd), Penrith North Lakes (3 tpd), Carlisle, Motherwell (2 tpd); Trains call at either Oxenholme Lake District or Penrith North Lakes; Alternates with services to Edinburgh Waverley
London Euston to Edinburgh Waverley via Birmingham New Street	6	Coventry, Birmingham International, Birmingham New Street, Sandwell & Dudley, Wolverhampton, Stafford, Crewe, Warrington Bank Quay, Wigan North Western, Preston, Lancaster, Oxenholme Lake District (5 tpd), Penrith North Lakes (3 tpd), Carlisle, Haymarket; Trains call at either Oxenholme Lake District or Penrith North Lakes; Alternates with services to Glasgow Central
Route B – London - West Midlands
Route	tph	Calling at
London Euston to Birmingham New Street (Note: Euston - Birmingham trains are supplemented by Euston - Birmingham - Blackpool/Scotland trains, providing three trains an hour)	1	Watford Junction, Milton Keynes Central, Rugby, Coventry, Birmingham International
London Euston to Birmingham New Street	1	Coventry, Birmingham International
Route C – London - Chester and North Wales
Route	tph	Calling at
London Euston to Chester	1	Stafford, Crewe; Six trains per day continue to Holyhead, calling at Flint, Prestatyn, Rhyl, Colwyn Bay, Llandudno Junction and Bangor.; One train per day has a dividing portion to Wrexham General.; Three trains per day Holyhead-bound and one train London-bound also call at Tamworth and Lichfield Trent Valley.; One train per day London-bound also call at Milton Keynes Central.; One train per day runs to Birmingham New Street, calling at Wolverhampton.
Route D – London - Liverpool
Route	tph	Calling at
London Euston to Liverpool Lime Street	1	Milton Keynes Central, Crewe, Runcorn, Liverpool South Parkway; One train per day additionally calls at Hartford in each direction.
London Euston to Liverpool Lime Street	1	Tamworth, Lichfield Trent Valley, Runcorn
Route E – London - Manchester
Route	tph	Calling at
London Euston to Manchester Piccadilly via Stoke-on-Trent	1	Milton Keynes Central, Rugby, Stoke-on-Trent, Macclesfield, Stockport
London Euston to Manchester Piccadilly via Stoke-on-Trent	1	Nuneaton, Stoke-on-Trent, Stockport
London Euston to Manchester Piccadilly via Crewe	1	Stafford, Crewe, Wilmslow, Stockport
Route F – London - North West and Scotland via Trent Valley
Route	tph	Calling at
London Euston to Blackpool North	1 tpd	Crewe, Warrington Bank Quay, Wigan North Western, Preston; Monday–Friday only.
London Euston to Glasgow Central	1	Warrington Bank Quay, Wigan North Western, Preston, Lancaster, Oxenholme Lake District (1 tp2h), Penrith North Lakes (1 tp2h), Carlisle, Motherwell (1 tp2h); Trains call at either Oxenholme Lake District or Penrith North Lakes

== Rolling stock ==
Avanti West Coast commenced operations having inherited the Super Voyager and Pendolino fleets from Virgin Trains. The 56 Pendolinos underwent major refurbishment, as announced at the start of the franchise contract, between 2021 and 2024.

=== Current fleet ===
In 2024, all the Class 221 Super Voyagers were replaced by 23 new trains from the Hitachi A-train family, with maintenance taking place at Alstom's Oxley TRSMD depot in Wolverhampton. These trains are divided into thirteen Class 805 bi-mode multiple units and ten Class 807 electric multiple units. Although the units have the same top speed, they do not tilt like the Class 390 Pendolinos nor the Class 221 Super Voyagers they replaced. The Class 805s are used on services to Chester, Wrexham General and North Wales, and the Class 807s are used on services to Birmingham New Street, Blackpool North and Liverpool Lime Street (alongside the Pendolinos).

Class	Image	Type	Top speed		Number	Carriages	Routes	Built	Notes
Class	Image	Type	mph	km/h	Number	Carriages	Routes	Built	Notes
390 Pendolino		EMU	125	200	21	9	London Euston – Glasgow Central / Edinburgh Waverley via Birmingham London Euston – Birmingham New Street; London Euston – Liverpool Lime Street via Trent Valley; London Euston – Manchester Piccadilly via Trent Valley	2001–2004	Pendolino (from the Italian word Pendolo) refers to tilting trains.; Retained and refurbished.
390 Pendolino		EMU	125	200	31	11	London Euston – Glasgow Central / Edinburgh Waverley via Birmingham London Euston – Birmingham New Street; London Euston – Liverpool Lime Street via Trent Valley; London Euston – Manchester Piccadilly via Trent Valley	2001–2004	Retained and refurbished.
390 Pendolino		EMU	125	200	4	11	London Euston – Glasgow Central / Edinburgh Waverley via Birmingham London Euston – Birmingham New Street; London Euston – Liverpool Lime Street via Trent Valley; London Euston – Manchester Piccadilly via Trent Valley	2010–2012	Retained and refurbished.
805 Evero		BMU	125	200	13	5	London Euston – Birmingham New Street London Euston – Chester / Holyhead / Wrexham General via Trent Valley; London Euston – Blackpool North via Trent Valley	2021–2024	Entered service in June 2024
807 Evero		EMU	125	200	10	7	London Euston – Birmingham New Street London Euston – Liverpool Lime Street via Trent Valley; London Euston – Glasgow Central via Trent Valley	2021–2025	Entered service in October 2024

=== Past fleet ===
In June 2022, two Class 221 units went off lease, and later transferred to Grand Central. In July 2024, a further ten units went off lease, with three transferring to CrossCountry. The remaining units worked limited services to Birmingham, Chester and North Wales before being withdrawn in December 2024.

Class	Image	Type	Top speed		Number	Carriages	Built
Class	Image	Type	mph	km/h	Number	Carriages	Built
221 Super Voyager		DEMU	125	200	20	5	2001–2002

Preceded by Virgin Trains; InterCity West Coast franchise	Operator of West Coast Partnership franchise 2019–2026	Incumbent
