= La Brugeoise et Nivelles =

Belgian manufacturer of railway rolling stock

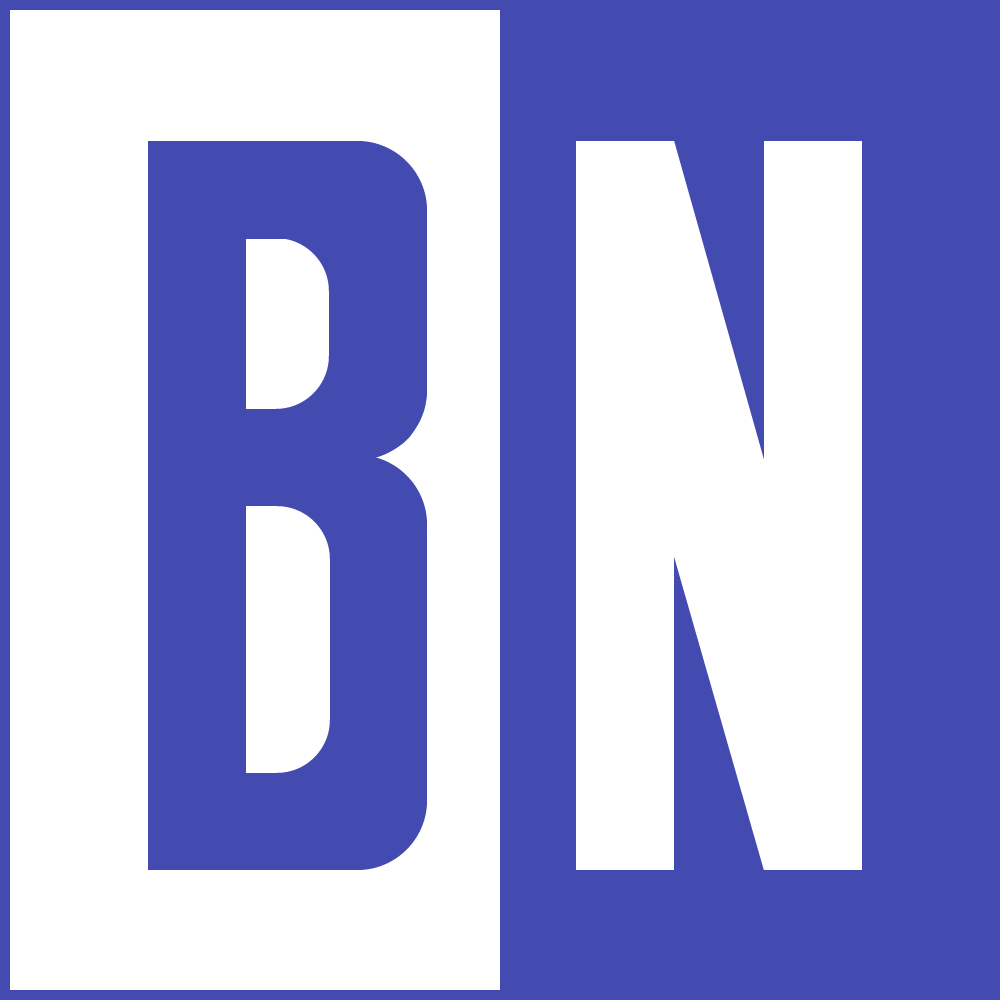
- Industry: Rail vehicles
- Predecessor: La Brugeoise, Nicaise et Delcuve, Les Ateliers Métallurgiques de Nivelles
- Founded: 1913
- Defunct: 1991–2011 (separated companies)
- Fate: Acquired By Bombardier
- Successor: after 1977 BN Constructions Ferroviaires et Métalliques after 1988 Bombardier Transportation Belgium
- Headquarters: Bruges, Belgium
- Area served: Worldwide

La Brugeoise et Nivelles, later BN Constructions Ferroviaires et Métalliques, was a Belgian manufacturer of railway locomotives and other rolling stock; it was formed by a merger of two companies: La Brugeoise et Nicaise et Delcuve and Les Ateliers Métallurgiques de Nivelles (French for "The Metallurgical Workshops of Nivelles").

The company was acquired by Bombardier Transportation in 1988, plants in Nivelles and Manage closed in 1989 and 2000; as of 2011, the plant located in Bruges operated as Bombardier Transportation Belgium.

== History ==
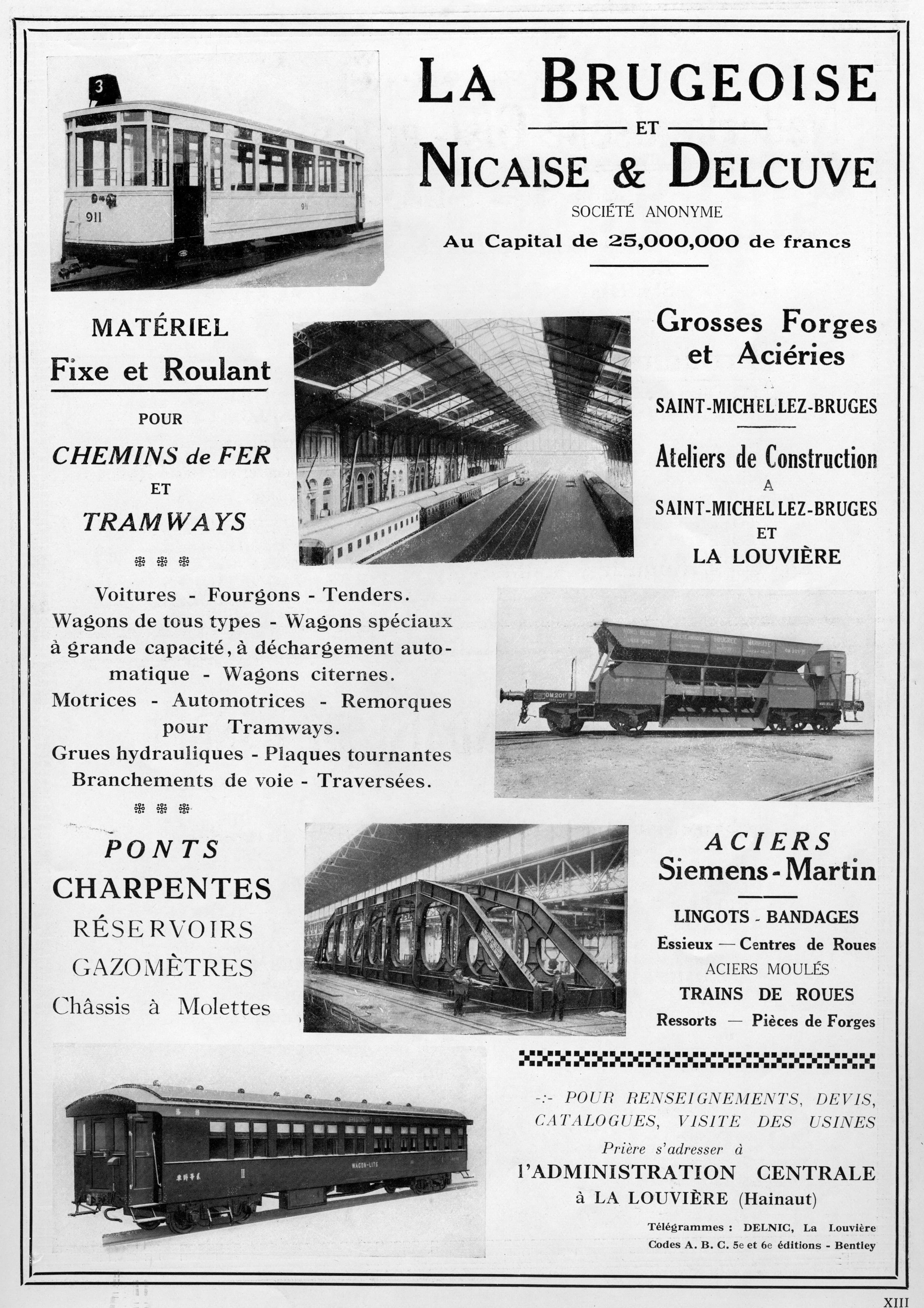
La Brugeoise advert circa 1930

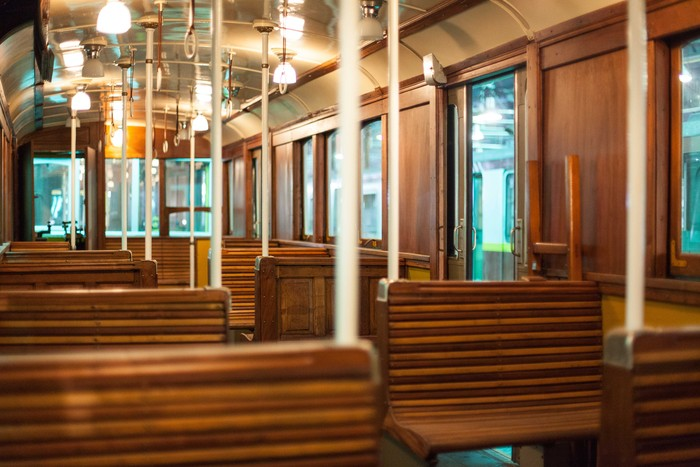
Interior of a Brugeoise underground car at the Polvorín Workshop

In 1851, Joseph De Jaegher founded a hardware store in the Burg in Bruges; in 1855, this expanded with a steel workshop on the Raamstraat, named Ateliers J. Jaegher; in 1891, this merged with another steel making company in the nearby Gieterijstraat, the Usines Ferdinand Feldhaus, to form the Ateliers de Construction Forges et Aceries de Bruges. By 1900, the company was a major Belgian metal engineering company. In 1905, the company moved its plant and offices to a larger site with good railway connections close to the Ghent Ostend Canal at Sint-Michiels in Bruges. Until 1913, the company operated as the Société Anonyme La Brugeoise, abbreviated as La Brugeoise.

In 1913, the company La Brugeoise et Nicaise et Delcuve was formed by the merger of the Bruges-based companies La Brugeoise and Nicaise et Delcuve during a re-organisation of the interests of the holding company Trust Métallurgique Belge-Français, and capitalised at 10 million francs; the new company included a modern steel works, forge and mills at Sint-Michiels.

During World War I, the facilities were occupied by German forces, and at the end of the war had been substantially damaged, however post war construction also required the organisation products. In 1919, control of the company was taken by the Société Générale de Belgique.

In 1956, this merged with Les Ateliers Métallurgiques de Nivelles to form La Brugeoise et Nivelles. In 1977, the company merged with Constructions Ferroviaries du Centre (CFC) (in Familleureux, Hainaut, Belgium) to form BN Constructions Ferroviaries et Métalliques (BN).

In 1986, Bombardier took at 45% share in BN, which was increased to 90.6% in 1988. The plants at Bruges and Manage became the BN division of Bombardier Eurorail in 1991.

The factory in Nivelles closed and was demolished in 1989/90.

In 2000, Bombardier announced it was to close the subsidiary plant BN Manage based in Manage, Belgium; the action attracted criticism from both trade unions and the Belgian government; perception was that Bombardier had used the 'jobs card' to win a Belgian double deck train contract worth 8.5 billion Belgian francs. The closure announcement came as a complete volte-face from Bombardier's previous statements which included optimistic statements about the Manage plant's future. Train-making ended at the site which was re-purposed by Duferco for steel plate processing.

As of 2011, the factory in Bruges was part of Bombardier Transportation as Bombardier Transportation Belgium.

== Products ==
In 1875, the Manage plant produced its first rail vehicles; in 1885, the Bruges plant produced its first tram. Much of the early output prior to that was freight wagons. In addition to railway rolling stock, the company also manufactured bridges, locks and sluice gates, cranes, and vessels for the chemical and sugar industries.

In 1961, the company acquired a license (from Anglo-Franco-Belge) to manufacture GM-EMD locomotives for the European market. (Note: These included the Class 55, Class 62 & CFL 1800.) In 1973, factories in Bruges and Familleureux produced the company's first underground trains, for the Brussels Intercommunal Transport Company.

BN produced 26 veículos leves sobre trilhos (VLT) light rail cars for use on Line 2 of the Rio de Janeiro Metro, which were later converted to full metro cars. Eight cars (delivered 1979) were built in Belgium and the remaining 18 (delivered 1980 and 1982) by Cobrasma in their plant in São Paulo. Some of the ones built by Cobrasma were used on the relatively short-lived Campinas light rail system, in the 1990s.

The original "Type 1" cars for Portland, Oregon's MAX Light Rail system, ordered in 1981, were built primarily by Bombardier Transportation but using a modified version of BN's design for the Rio de Janeiro Metro cars, in a joint venture between the two manufacturers, and BN itself fabricated parts of the truck (bogie) frame, in Belgium. They were assembled in North America using bodyshells sourced in La Pocatiere, Canada.

A consortium of BN and ACEC provided the first-generation light rail vehicles (LRTA 1000 class) for the Manila LRT Line 1, which opened in 1984. The trains were purchased by the Philippine government on loan with the Belgian government. Originally operating as two-car sets, the 1000 class cars were rebuilt into three-car sets and retrofitted with air conditioning. These cars are being decommissioned with the arrival of newer 13000 class LRVs built by Construcciones y Auxiliar de Ferrocarriles (CAF).

In 1989, a consortium of BN, ANF Industrie and Bombardier won the order for the construction of the passenger Eurotunnel Shuttle wagons, valued at 36 billion francs, of which BN's contribution was valued at 8 billion.

In 1994, the company, in association with INKA and Holec, built commuter trains for the KRL Jabotabek system.

In 1998, after takeover by Bombardier, the company obtained an order with a total value of 22.2 billion Belgian francs to produce 105 Bombardier Voyager trains for the Virgin Rail Group, Midland Mainline and Hull Trains in the United Kingdom at the Bruges and Manage plants; BN's value share of the contract was estimated at 8 to 10 billion Belgian francs. Deliveries took place in the early 2000s. Also as part of Bombardier, the company also produced Flexity Outlook and Flexity Swift vehicles for Brussels and Rotterdam respectively, the bodyshells of the Autorail à grande capacité for the SNCF, and B09 vehicles for the Docklands Light Railway. Finally, the company continues to supply the Belgian Railways (NMBS/SNCB) with passenger rail vehicles.

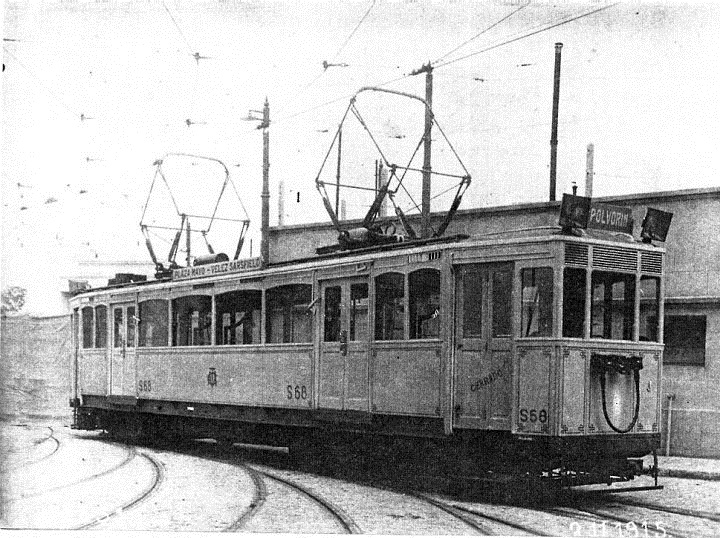
"La Brugeoise" metro-tram for Argentina, 1913

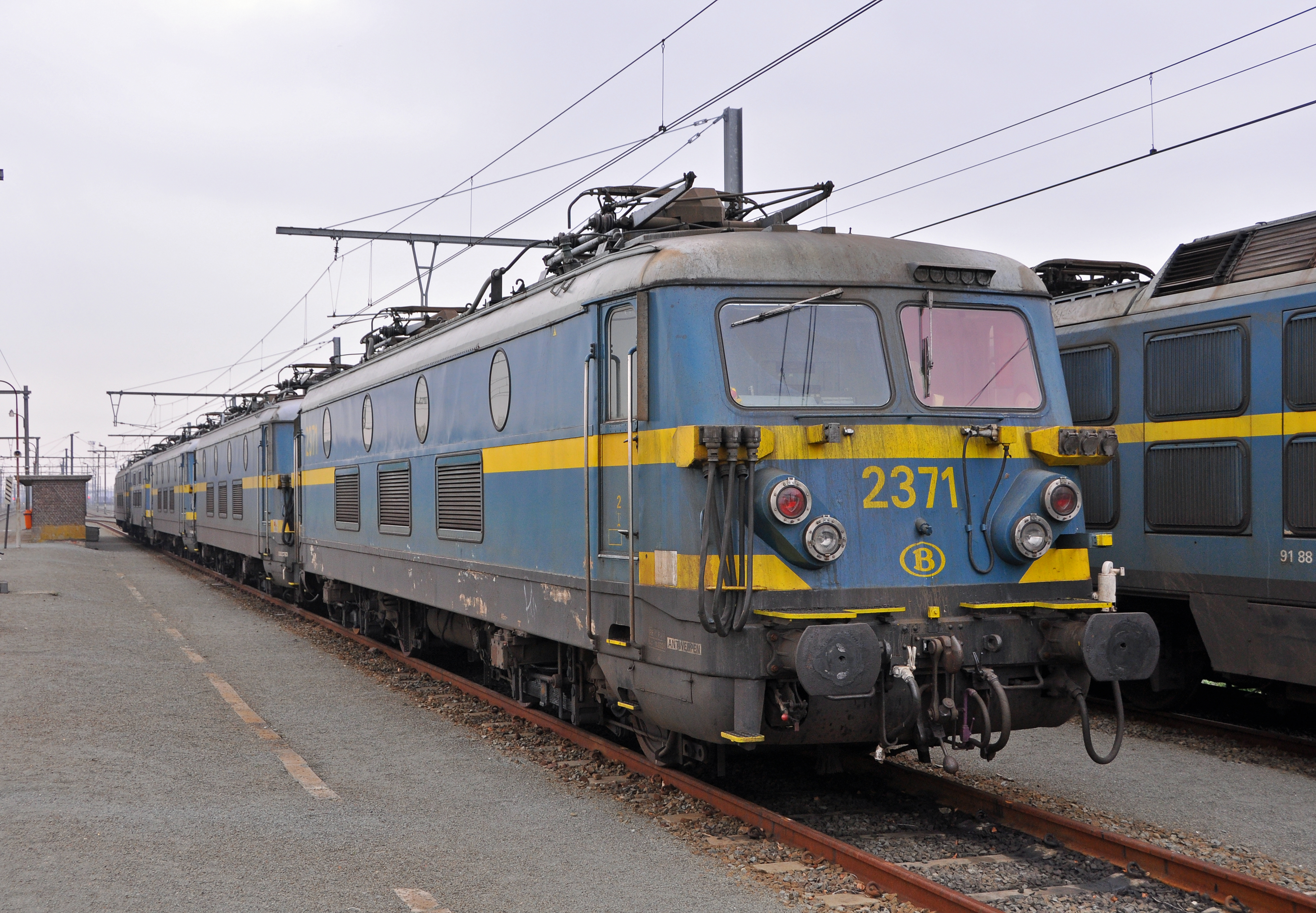
Belgian Railways Class 23, built 1955–7

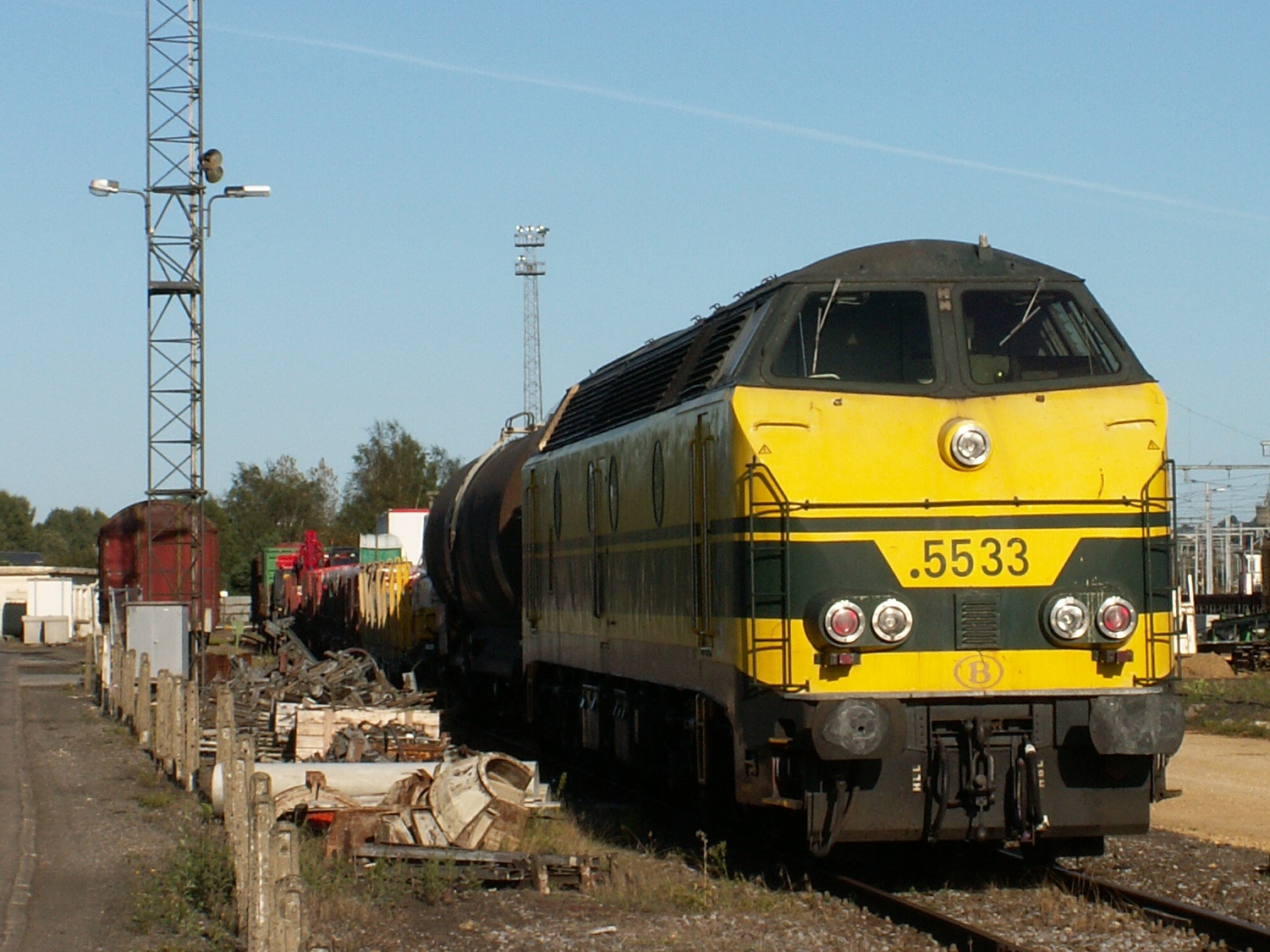
Belgian Railways Class 55, built 1961–62 (EMD license)

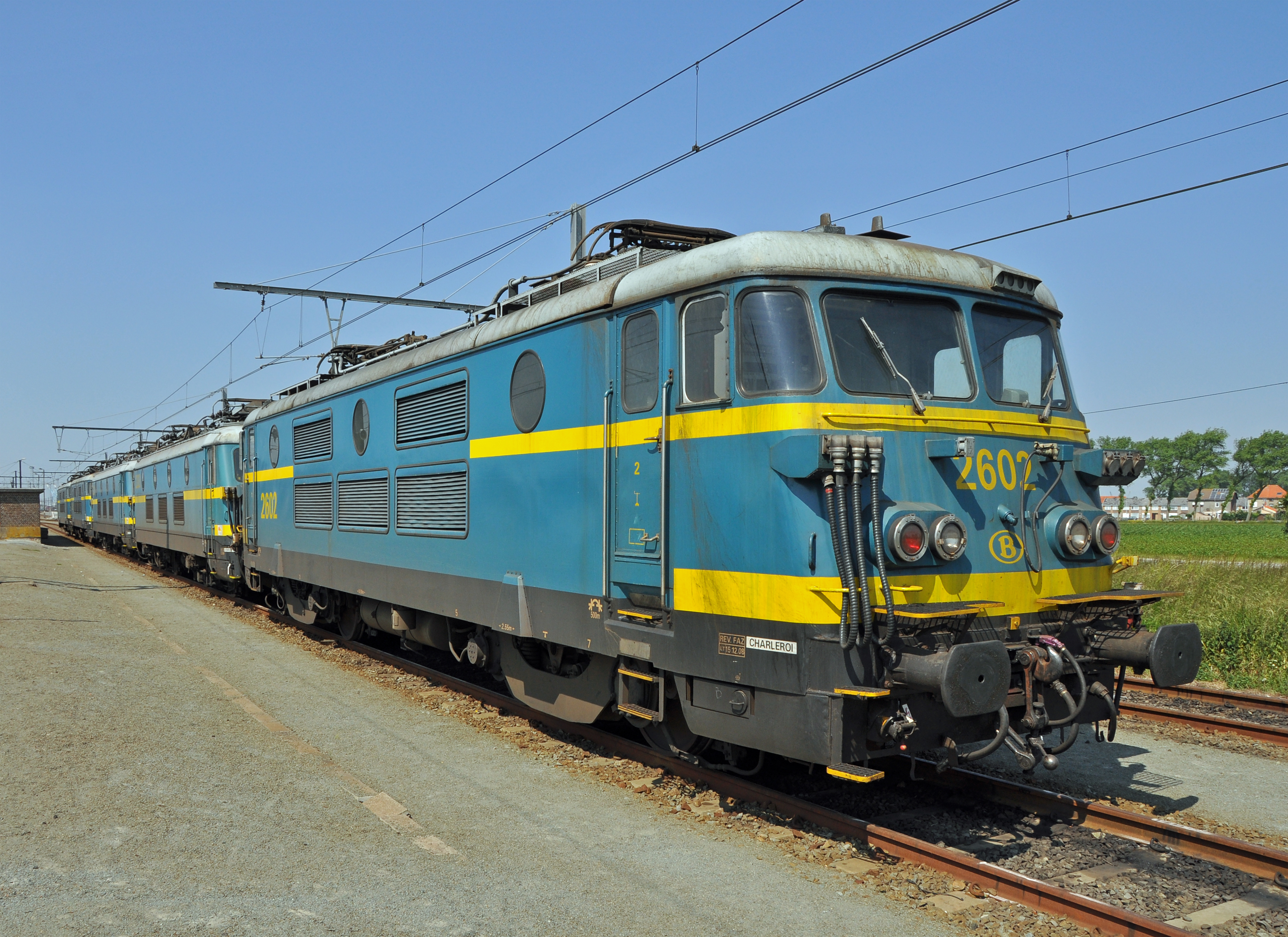
Belgian Railways Class 26, built 1964–71

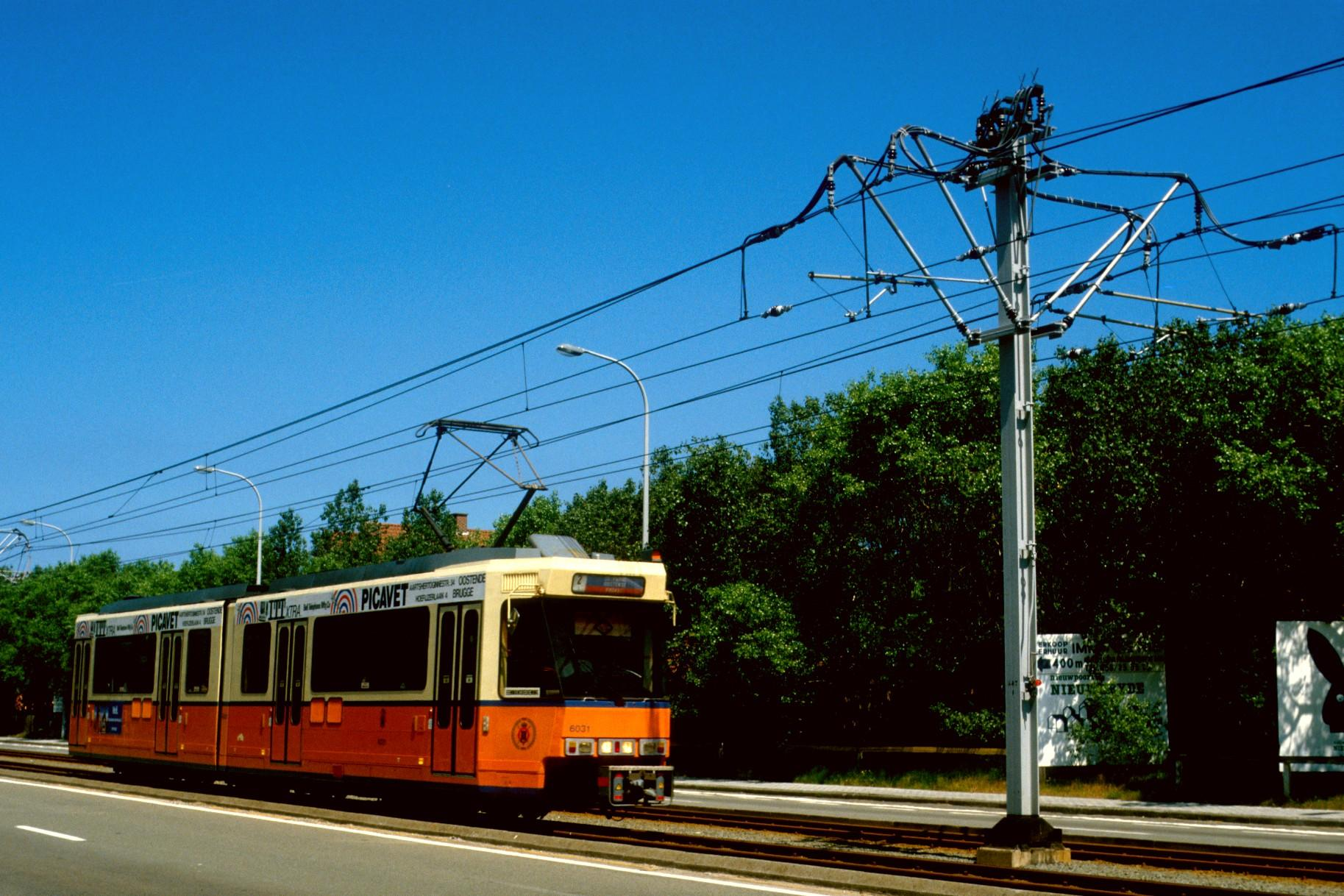
Kusttram (Belgium) rolling stock, built 1980–83

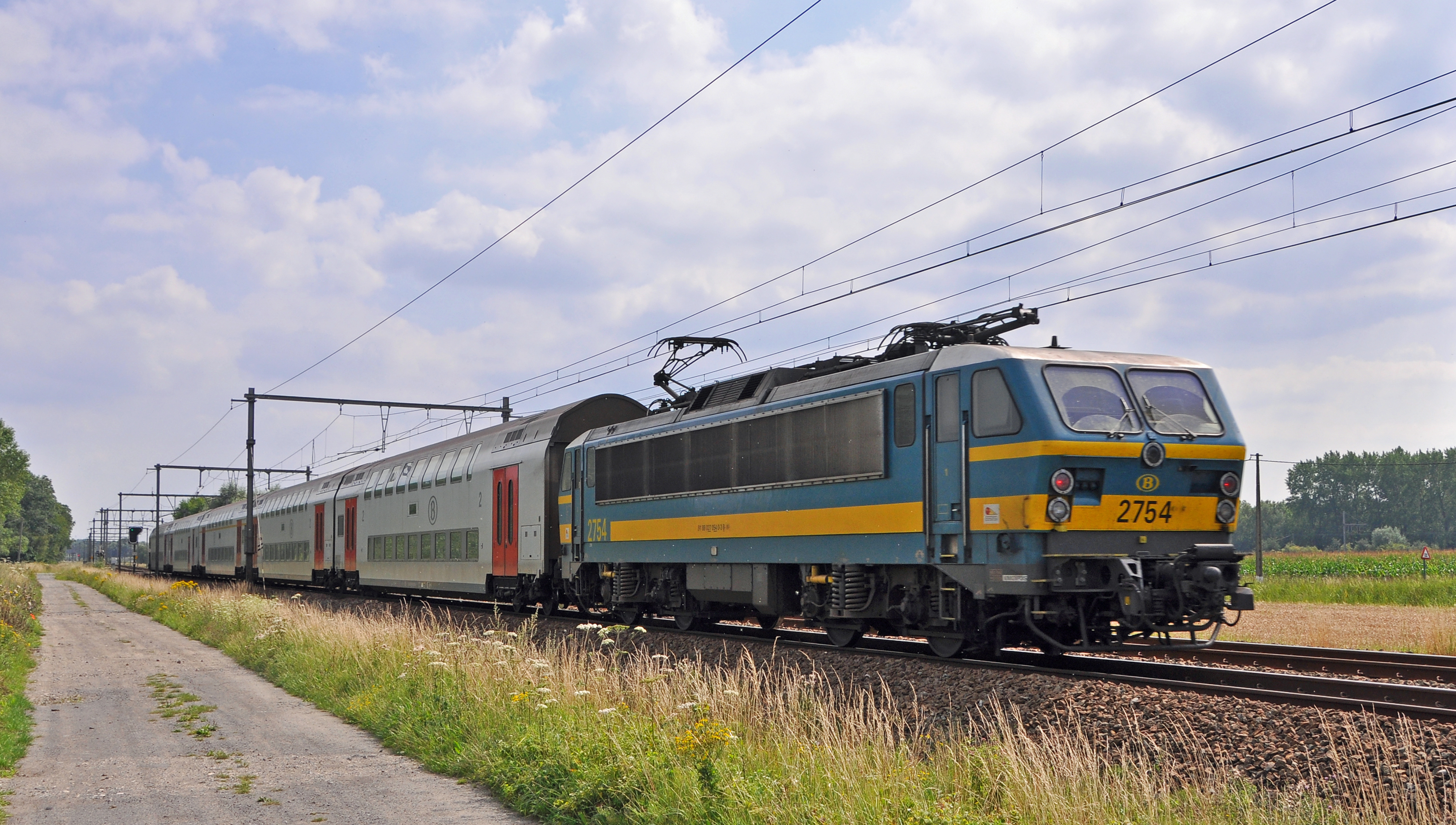
Belgian Railways Class 27, built 1981–84

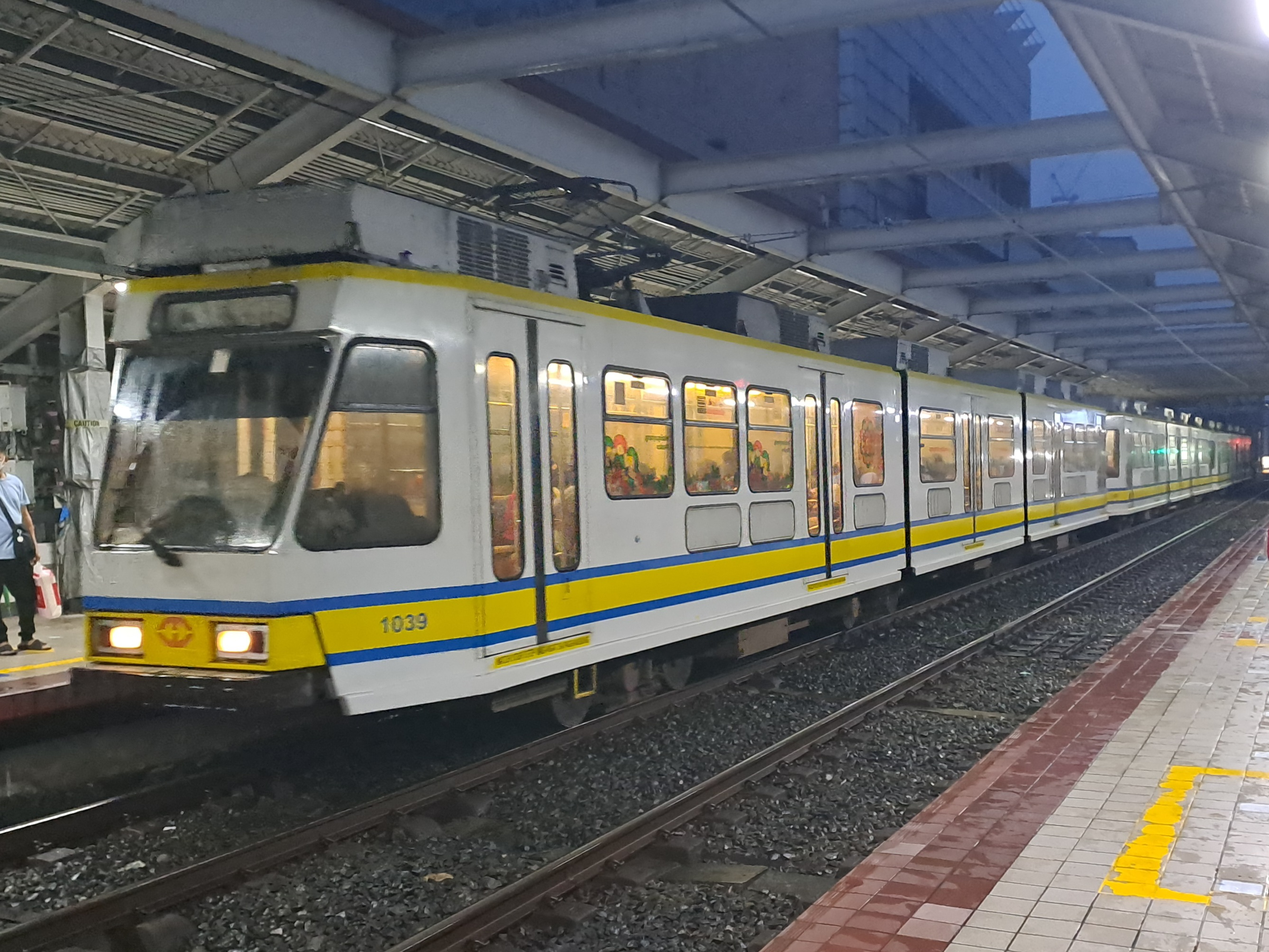
Manila LRTA 1000 class LRV (in consortium with ACEC), built 1982-83

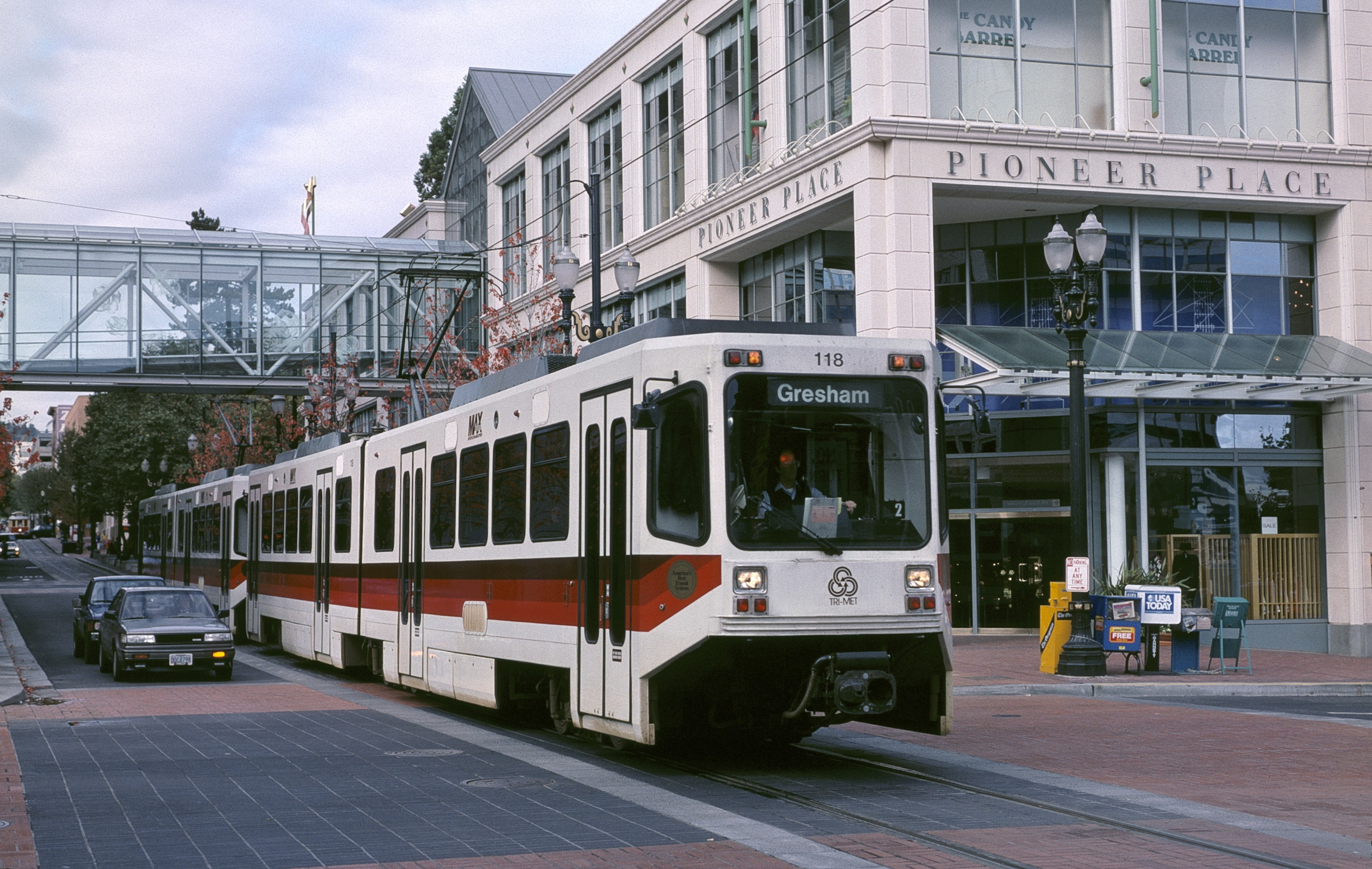
Portland MAX Type 1 LRV (Bombardier j.v.), built 1983–86

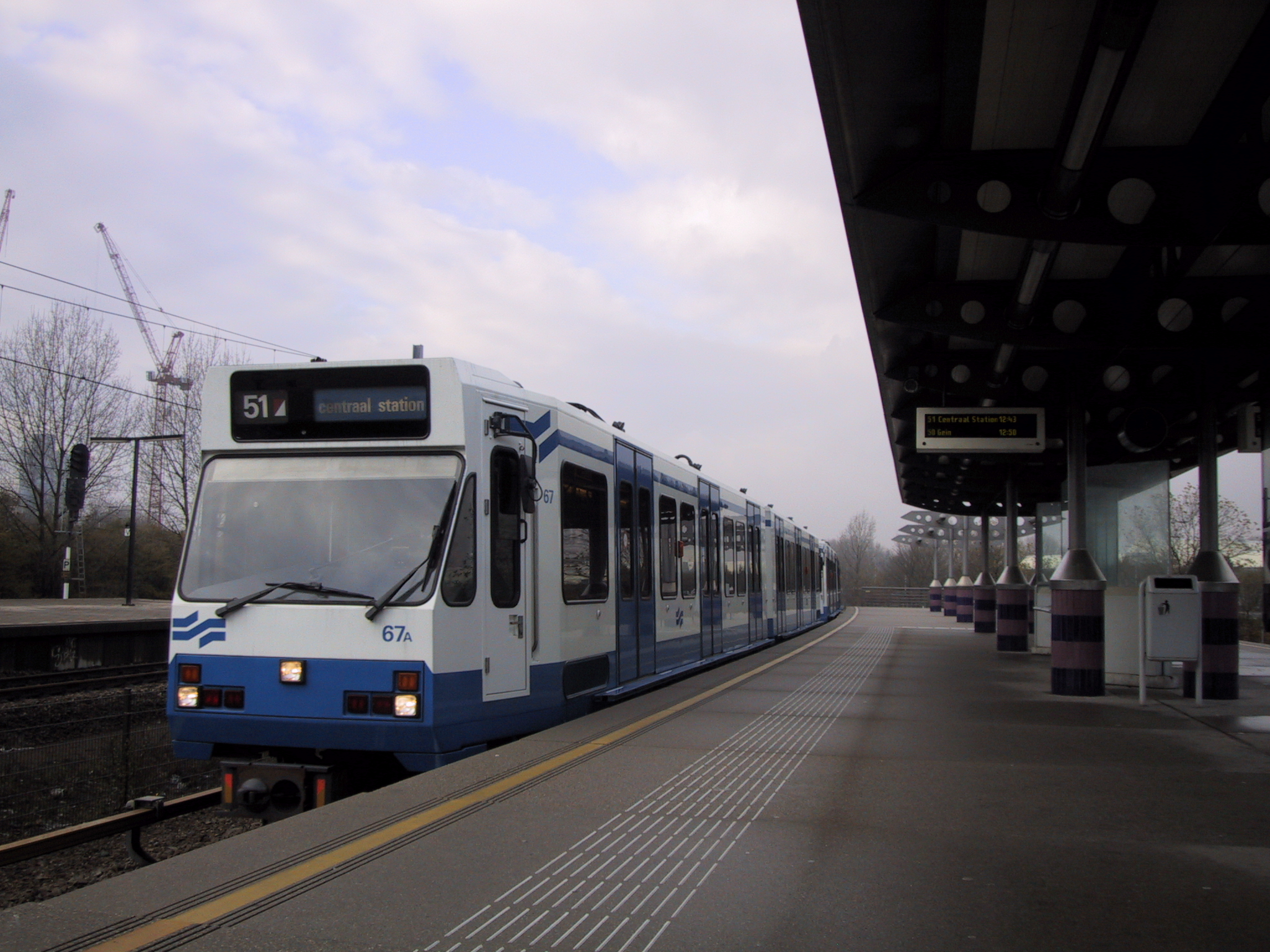
Express tram for Amsterdam Metro, built 1990–94

BN-Holec Electric Train (Indonesia), Built 1994–2001

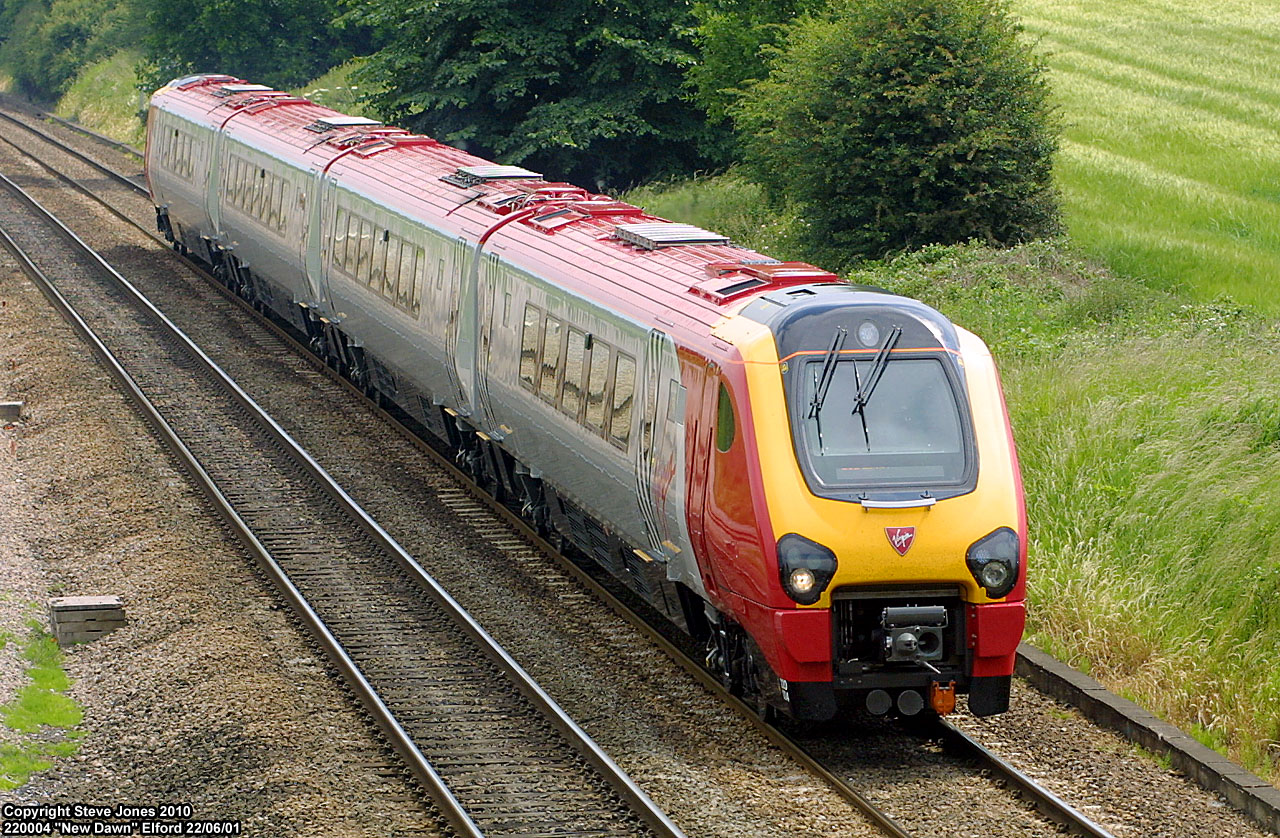
Virgin CrossCountry Class 220 in June 2001

== See also ==
- Ateliers de Constructions Electriques de Charleroi, manufacturer of electrical equipment for BN-built locomotives
- Alstom Crespin, rolling stock manufacturer in northern France, part of Bombardier Transportation
- La Brugeoise cars (Buenos Aires Underground)
