= British Rail Class 221 =

Bombardier diesel tilting train

British Rail Class 221 Super Voyager
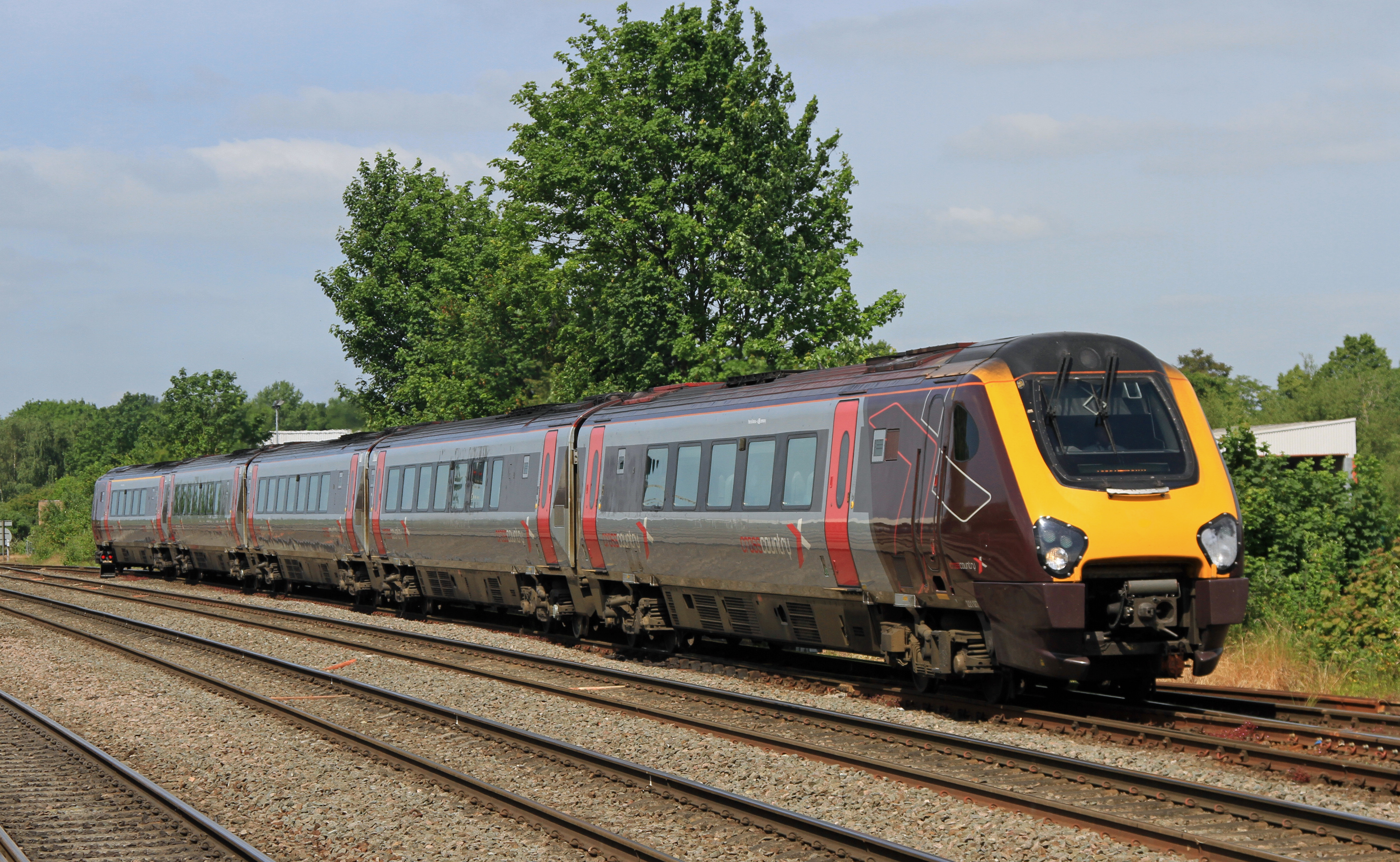
- CrossCountry Class 221 at Leamington Spa in 2015

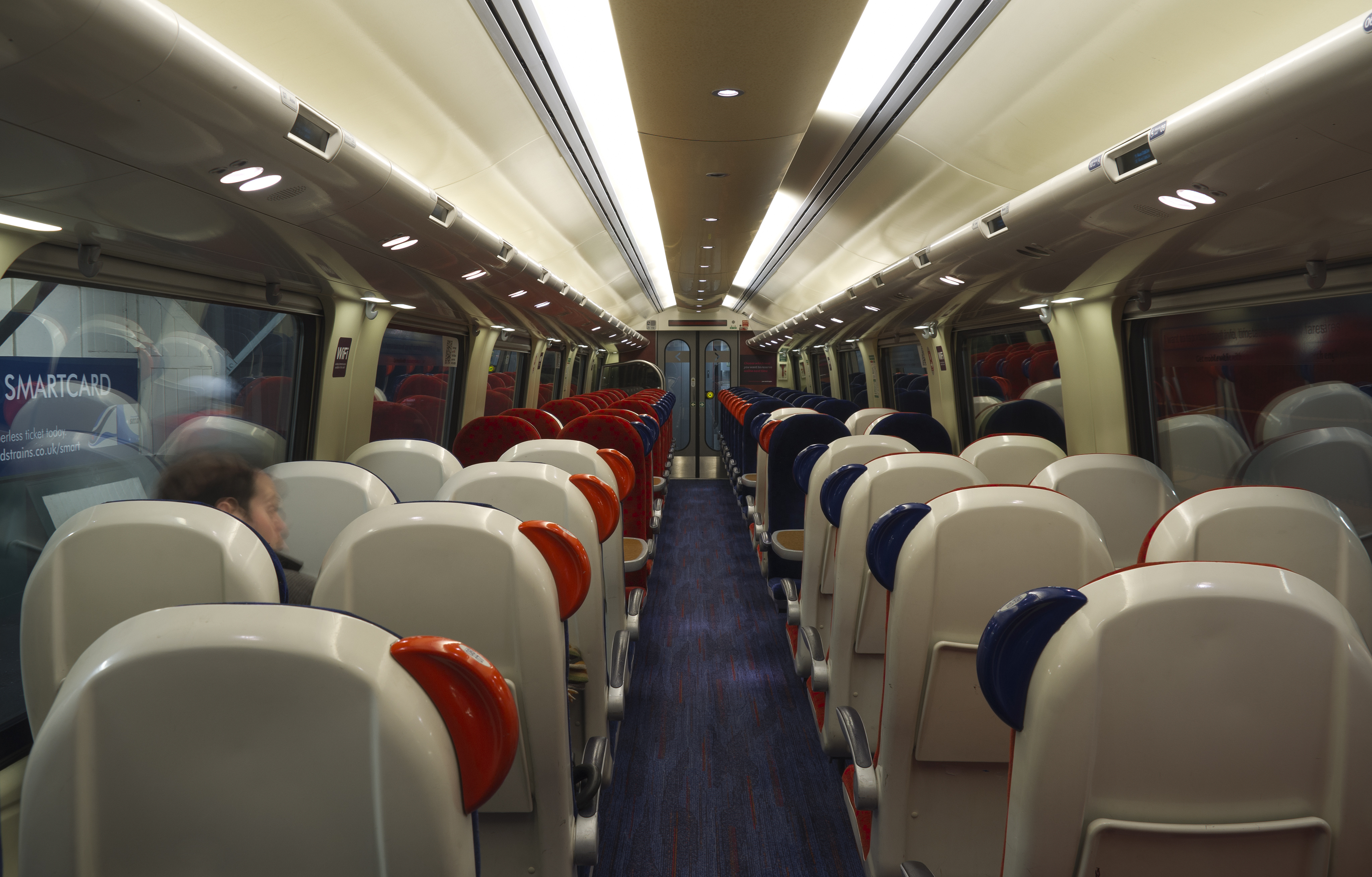
- Standard Class interior of a CrossCountry Class 221
- In service: 12 April 2002 – present
- Manufacturer: Bombardier Transportation
- Built at: Bruges, Belgium; Wakefield, England
- Family name: Voyager
- Replaced: InterCity 125; Class 47 locos & Mark 2 coaches; Class 158
- Constructed: 2001–2002
- Number built: 44
- Number in service: 38
- Successor: Class 805 & Class 807 (Avanti West Coast); Future: Class 820 (Grand Central)
- Formation: 4-car units: DMSL-MSRB-MSL(A)-DMFL; 5-car units: DMSL-MSRB-MSL(A)-MSL(B)-DMFL
- Diagram: DMSL vehicles: DF210; MSRB vehicles: DG201; MSL vehicles: DG202; DMFL vehicles: DF101
- Fleet numbers: 221101–221144
- Capacity: As built: 4-car units: 186 seats (26 first-class, 160 standard); 5-car units: 246 seats (26 first-class, 220 standard)
- Owner: Beacon Rail
- Operators: Current; CrossCountry; Grand Central; Future; East Midlands Railway
- Depots: Current; Central Rivers (Staffordshire); Future; Crofton TMD

Specifications
- Car body construction: Steel
- Car length: DM vehs.: 23.85 m (78 ft 3 in); Others: 23.67 m (77 ft 8 in)
- Width: 2.73 m (8 ft 11 in)
- Height: 3.75 m (12 ft 4 in)
- Doors: Single-leaf swing plug
- Wheelbase: Bogies: 2.700 m (8 ft 10.3 in)
- Maximum speed: 125 mph (200 km/h)
- Axle load: Approx. 17 t (17 LT; 19 ST)
- Traction system: Alstom Onix 800 IGBT, two traction motors per car
- Prime movers: Cummins QSK19-R, one per car
- Engine type: Inline-6 turbo-diesel
- Displacement: 19 L (1,159 cu in) per engine
- Power output: 559 kW (750 hp) per engine; 350 kW (470 hp) per traction motor
- UIC classification: 1A′A1′+1A′A1′+...+1A′A1′
- Bogies: Bombardier HVP
- Braking systems: Electro-pneumatic (disc) and rheostatic
- Safety systems: AWS; TPWS; TASS
- Coupling system: Dellner 12
- Multiple working: Within class, and with Class 220
- Track gauge: 1,435 mm (4 ft 8 1/2 in) standard gauge

The British Rail Class 221 Super Voyager is a class of tilting diesel-electric multiple unit express passenger trains built in Bruges, Belgium and Wakefield, by Bombardier Transportation in 2001–02.

The class is similar to the Class 220 Voyager, but was built with a tilting mechanism. Additionally, most have five coaches, and they have a different bogie design. They have a maximum speed of 125 mph (200 km/h).

The trains are divided between two operators, CrossCountry (36 sets) and Grand Central (2 sets), the latter two of which will be temporarily going to East Midlands Railway. CrossCountry sets had their tilt function disabled in 2008 to improve reliability and reduce maintenance costs, and Grand Central sets do not use theirs, although they remain in place. There are also a number of additional sets in storage, having been stood down from Avanti West Coast in December 2024.

== Details ==
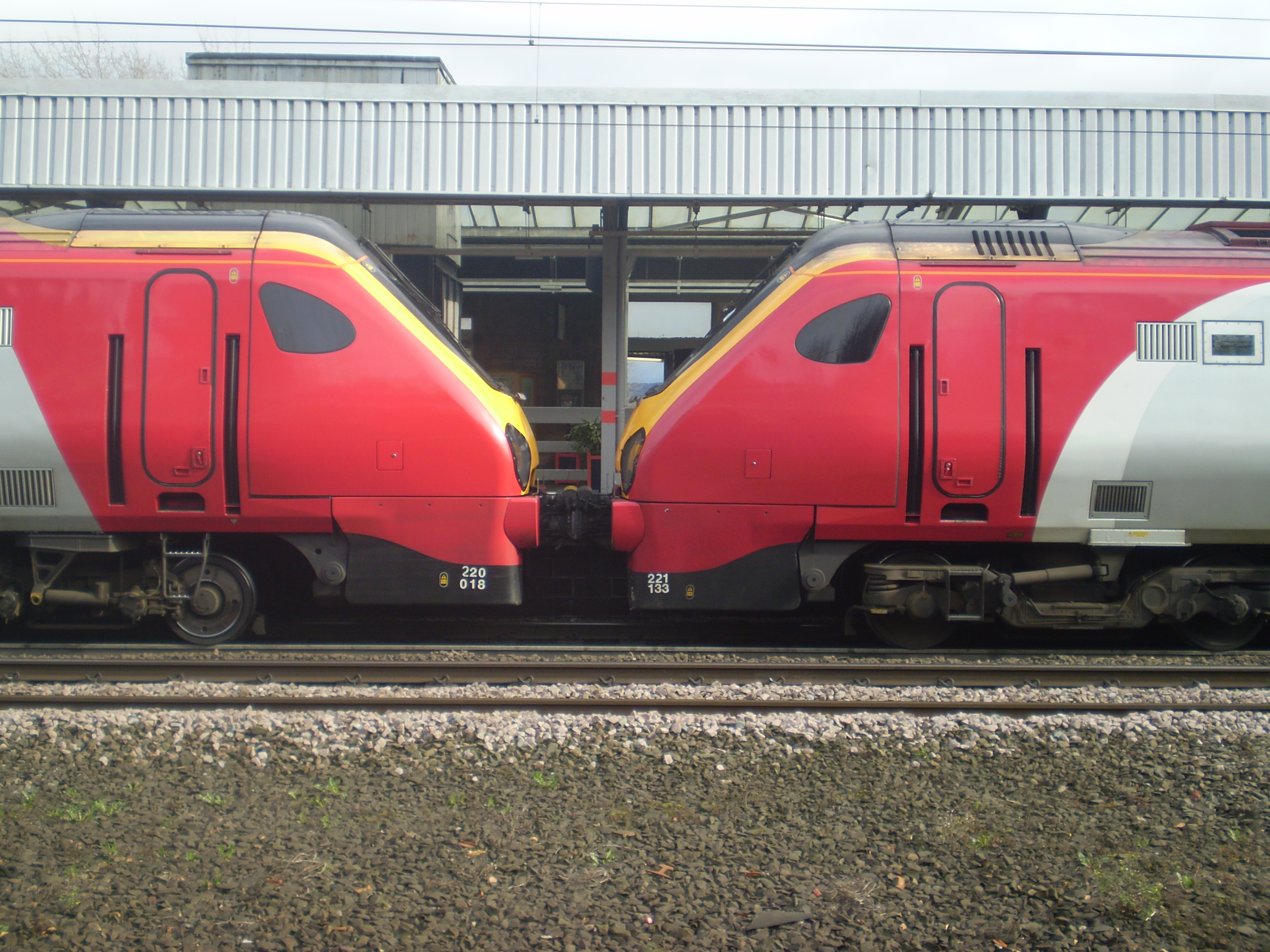
Classes 220 (left) and 221 (right) showing the differing bogie designs

The Class 221 units were produced as five- or four-coach sets. Each coach is equipped with a Cummins QSK19 diesel engine producing 560 kW (750 hp) at 1,800 rpm, driving an electrical generator which powers two motors, each driving one (inner) axle per bogie via a cardan shaft and final drive. 1,200 miles (1,900 km) can be travelled between refuellings. The coach bodies, the engines and most of the equipment of the Class 221 are the same as the Class 220, but the bogies are very different: the Class 220 Voyager B5000 bogies have inside-frames which expose the whole of the wheel faces, while the Class 221 SuperVoyager Y36 bogies have a more traditional outside-framed bogie. Unlike the Class 220, the Class 221 was built with a hydraulic-actuated tilting system to run at high speed around bends, though this has now been disabled from the 24 sets operated by CrossCountry.

Each coach weighs between 55 and 57 tonnes, with a total train weight of 281.9 tonnes for a five-car set (227 tonnes for a four-car set). The trains have air-operated (pneumatic) and rheostatic brakes, with an emergency stopping distance of 350 m (1,150 ft) at 60 mph (97 km/h).

== Formation and passenger facilities ==
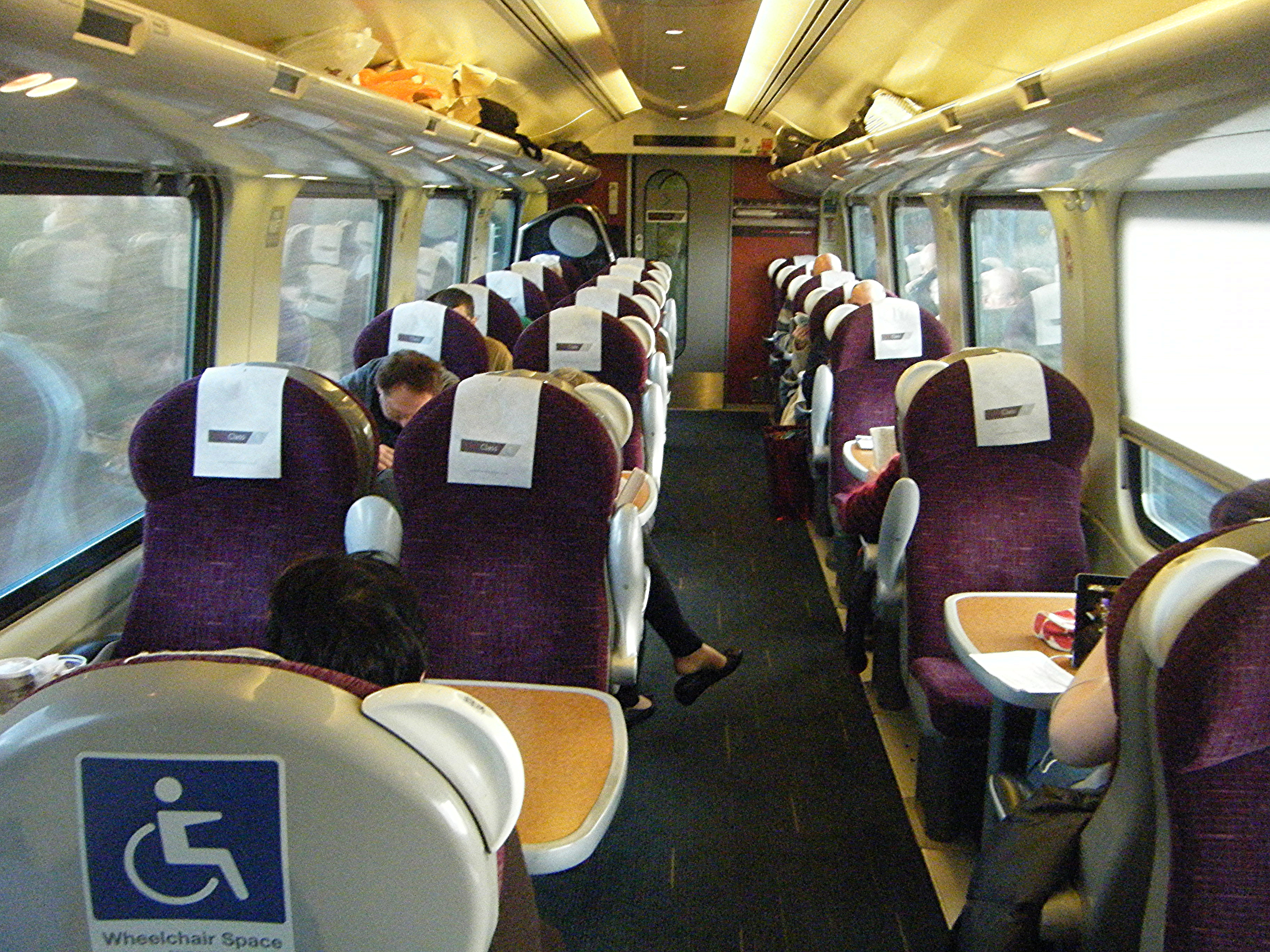
The first class interior on a CrossCountry Class 221

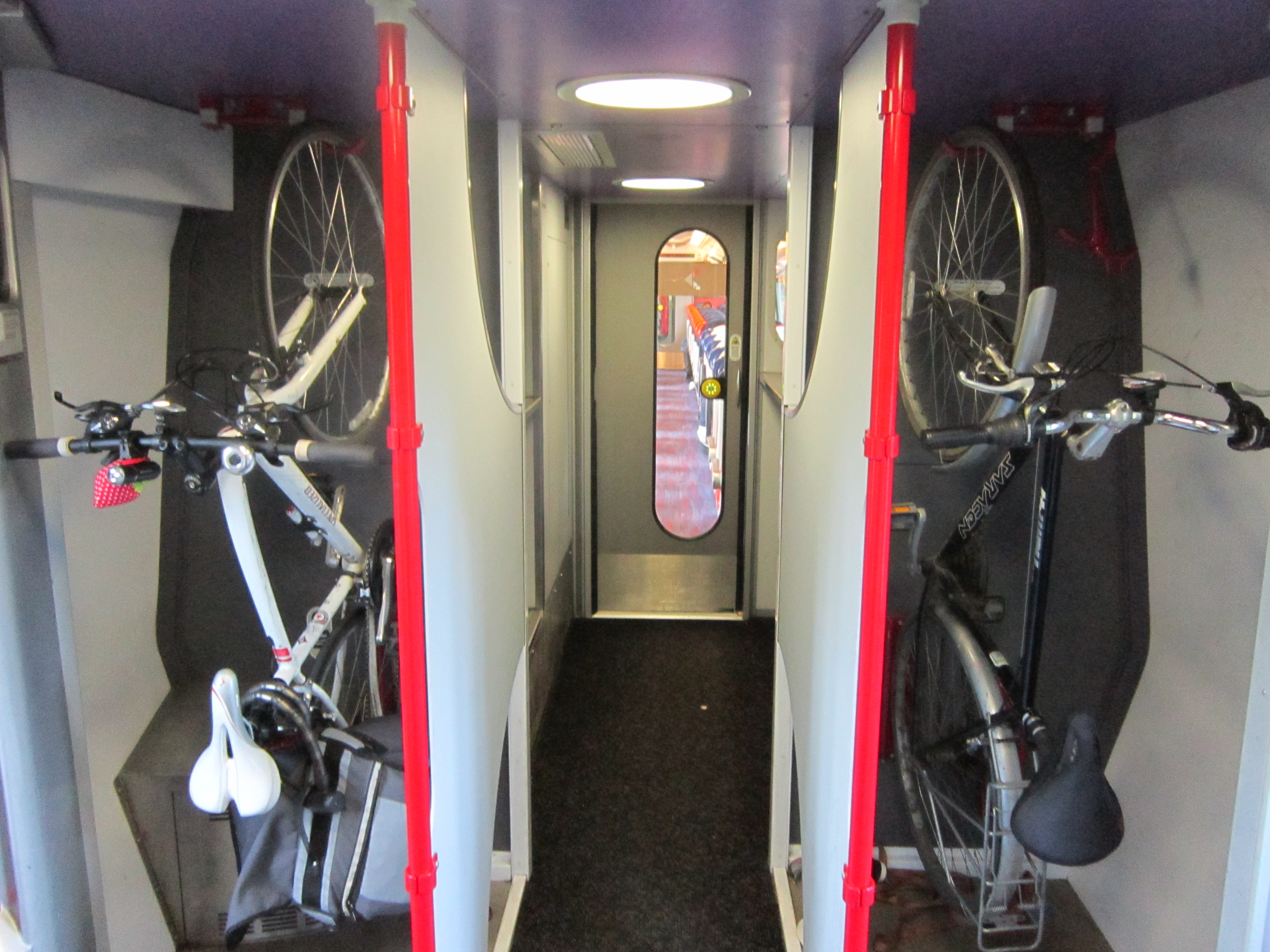
Bicycle compartments on a CrossCountry Class 221

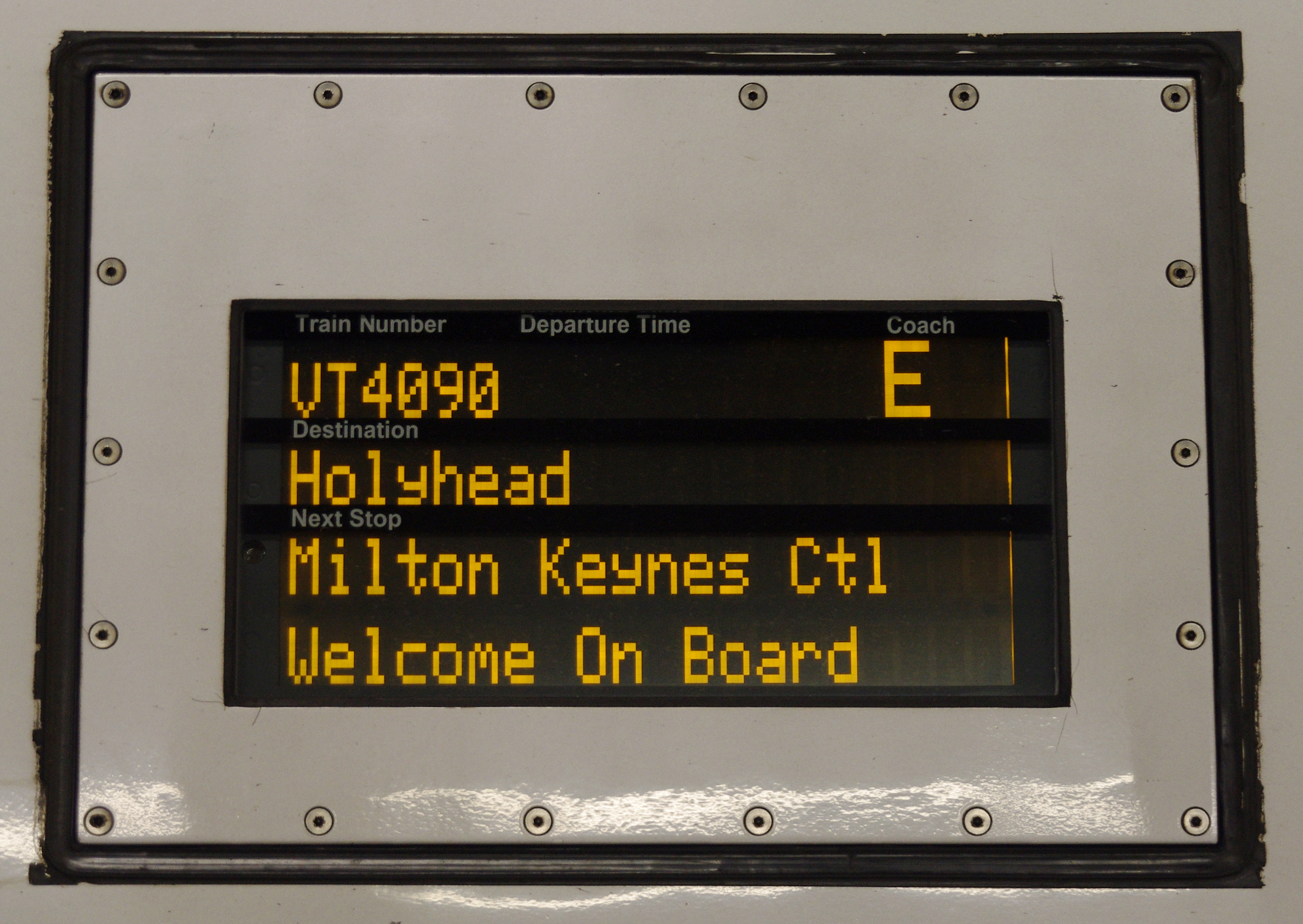
The electronic information display board on Virgin Trains West Coast Class 221, showing a destination of Holyhead

In November 2010, Virgin Trains reformed its 3 four-car sets into 2 five-car sets and a residual spare two-car set by inserting the two intermediate (non-driving) cars from 221144 into 221142 and 221143, giving 20 five-car sets (and two spare driving cars). This was aimed at providing more flexibility and consistency in operating Birmingham-Scotland and London-North Wales services.

The trains have been criticised for providing insufficient space for luggage and bicycles.

The formation and capacity of each unit depends on the operator.

Operator	Cars per set	First Class Seats	Standard Class Seats	Wheelchair spaces	Bicycle storage	Formation
Avanti West Coast	5	26	230	2	4	Coach A Quiet Zone, Coach D Shop, Coach E First Class.
CrossCountry	5	26	236	2	3	Coach A First Class, Coach D bicycle rack and luggage storage, at seat catering service.
CrossCountry	4	26	174	2	3	Coach A First Class, Coach D bicycle rack and luggage storage, at seat catering service.

== Operations ==
All units are owned by Beacon Rail, after they were purchased from Voyager Rail Leasing, a consortium of Lloyds Banking Group and Angel Trains.

=== Avanti West Coast ===
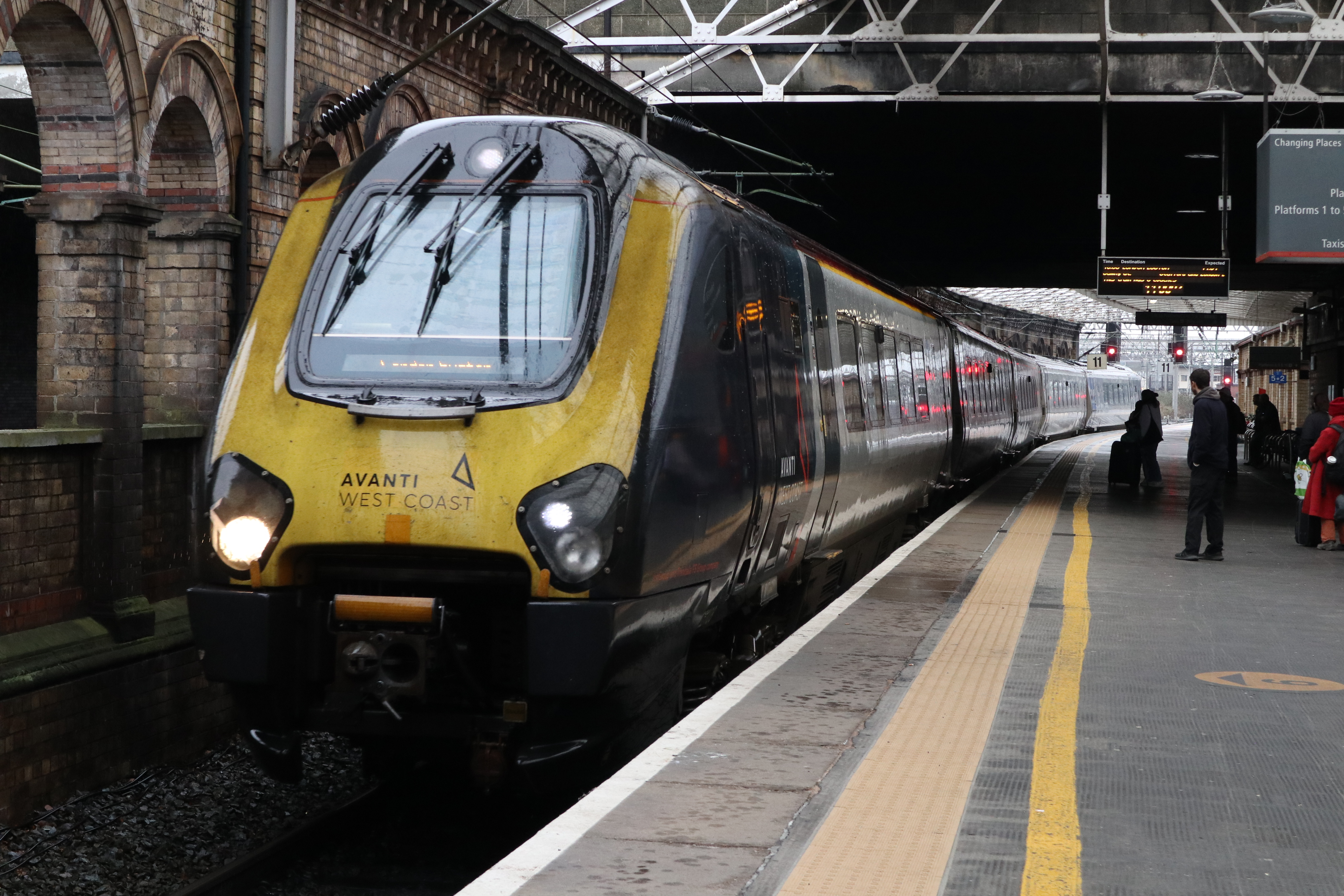
Avanti West Coast Class 221 at Crewe in 2024, in a light Avanti ends livery.

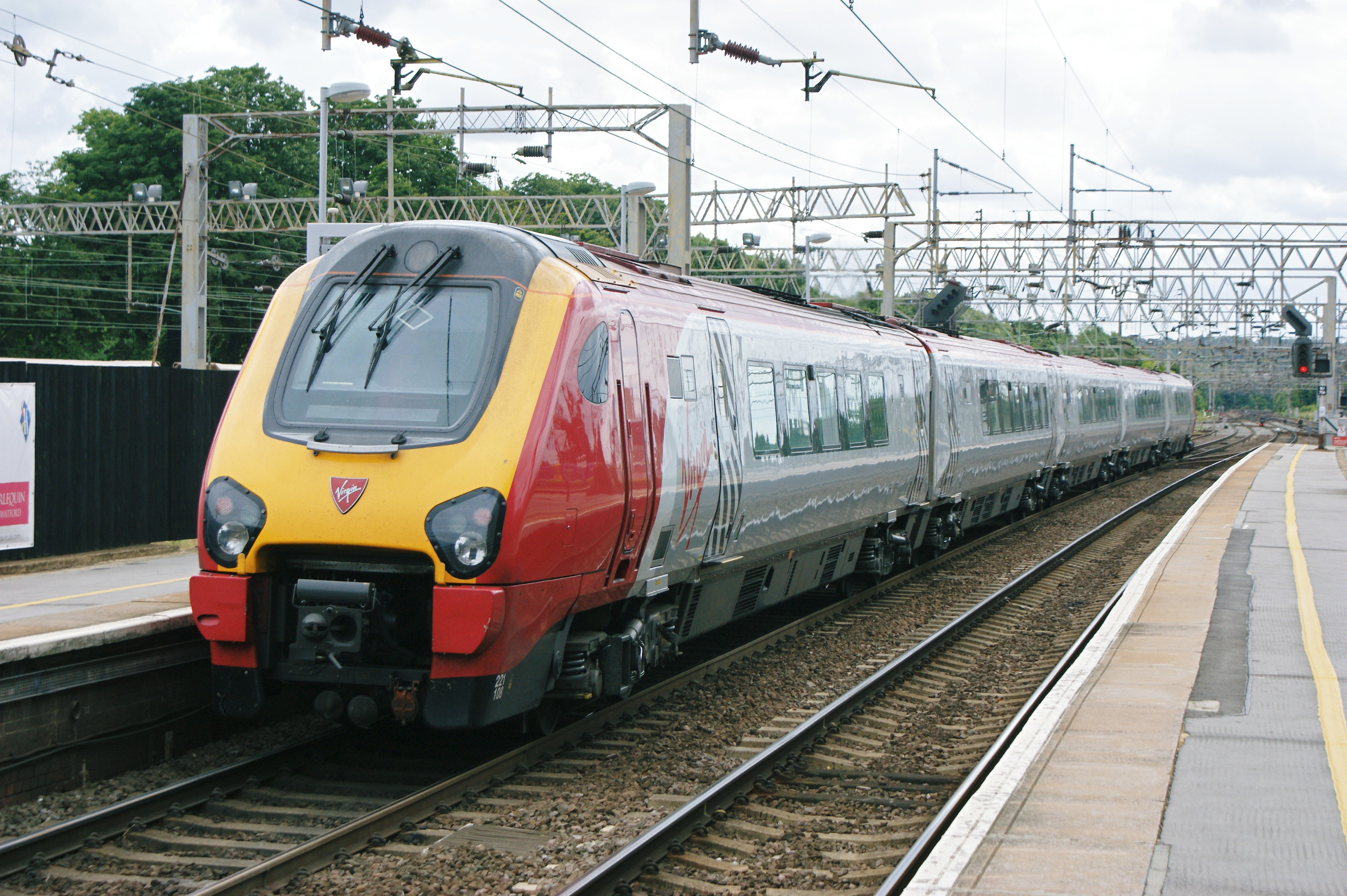
Virgin Trains West Coast Class 221 at Watford Junction in 2008

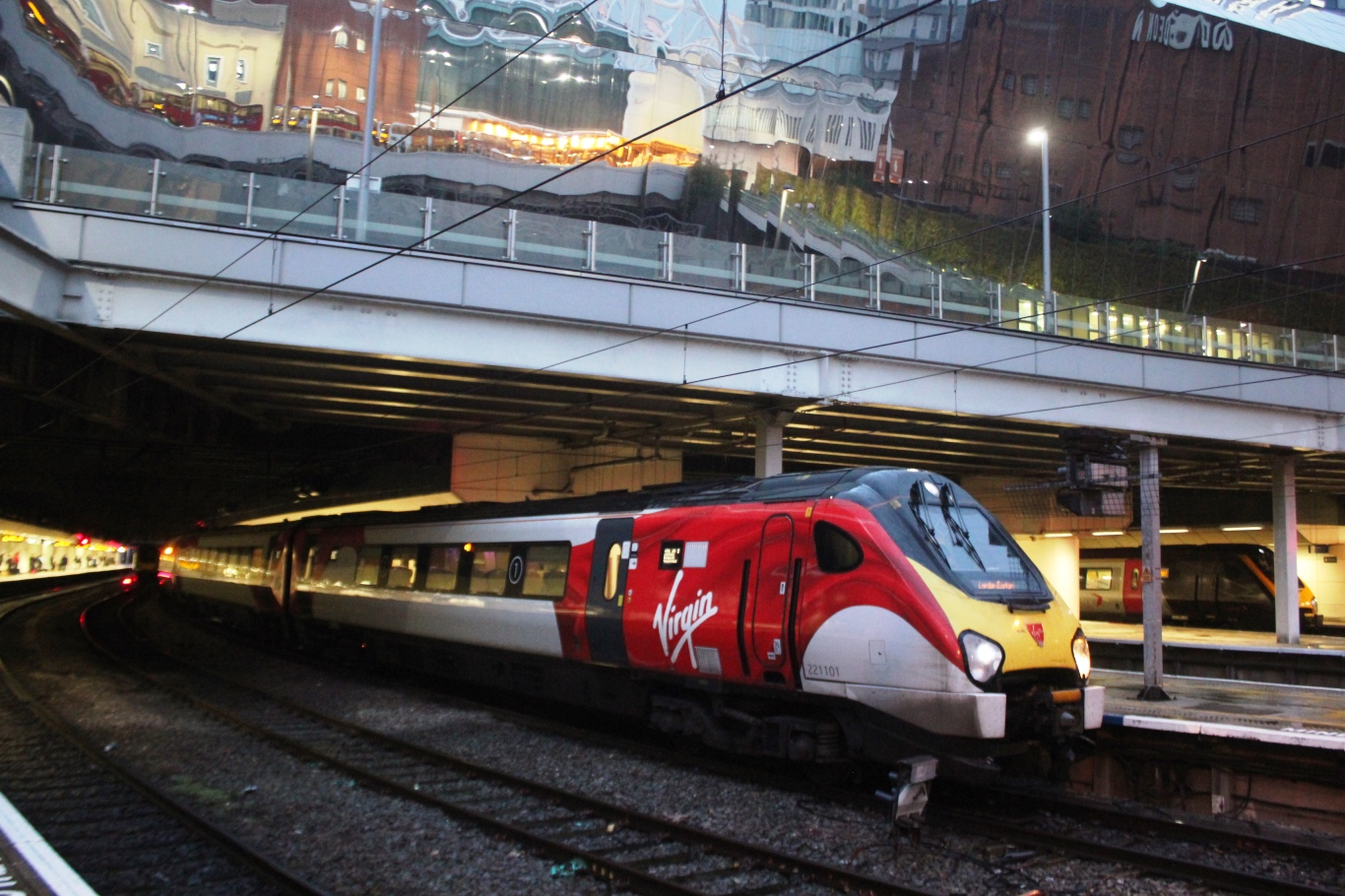
Virgin Trains West Coast Class 221 in its 'Flowing silk' livery at Birmingham New Street in 2019

In December 2019, Avanti West Coast placed an order for 10 seven-car Class 807 electric units which have replaced its Class 221 fleet, along with 13 Class 805 bi-mode units as part of £350 million contract with Hitachi. These were planned to enter service in 2023.

In June 2022, 221142 and 221143 were the first Class 221 units to be returned to their owners after their leases to Avanti West Coast ended. With the introduction of the Class 805 units, seven Class 221s have so far been transferred to CrossCountry in 2024. Avanti West Coast withdrew its final pair of Class 221s on 14 December 2024.

=== CrossCountry ===
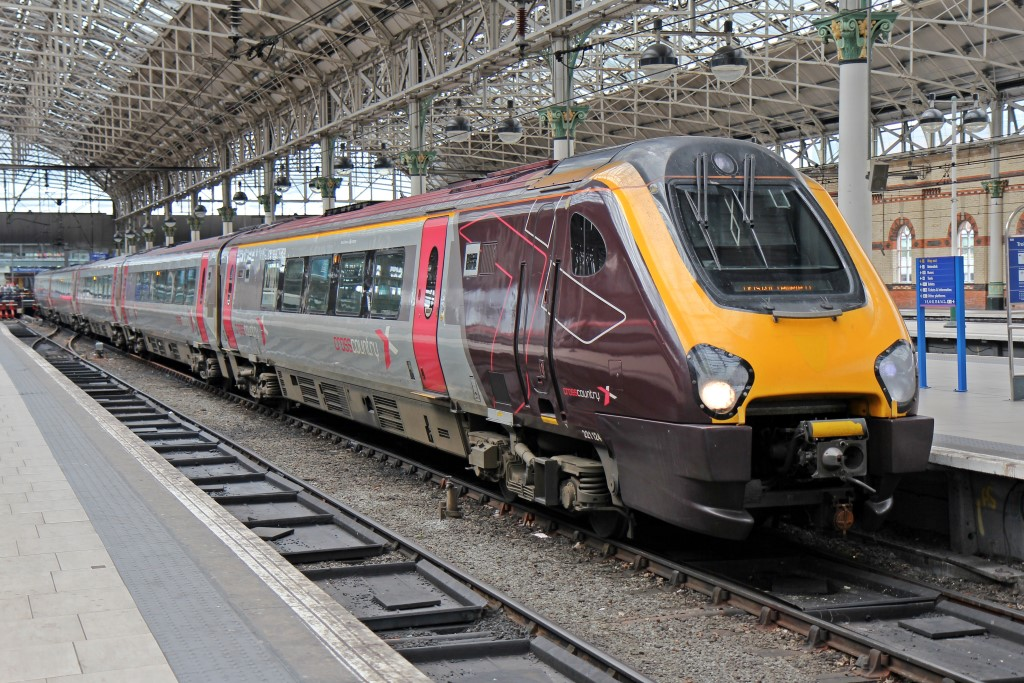
CrossCountry Class 221 at Manchester Piccadilly in 2015

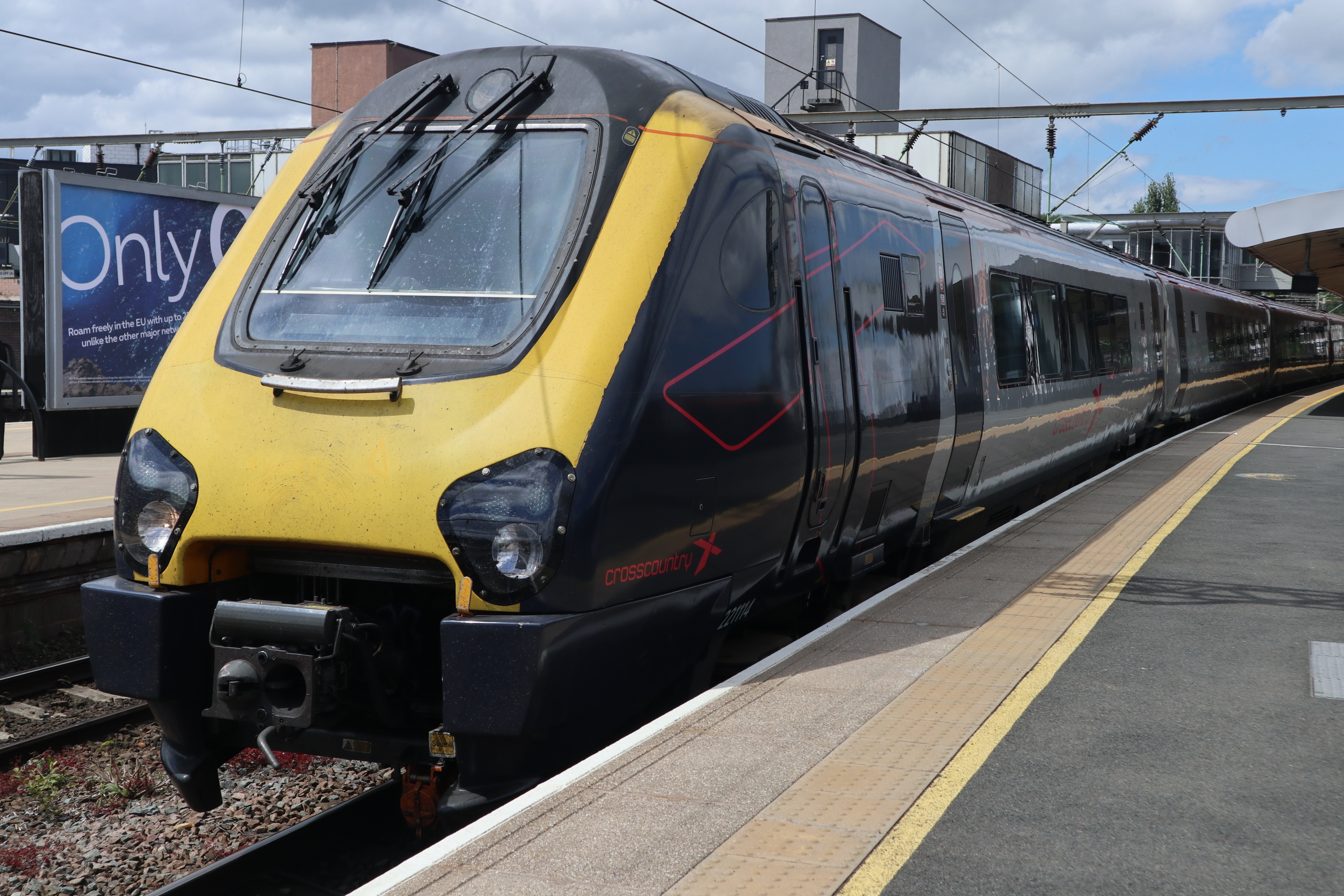
Ex-Avanti West Coast Class 221 operating with Cross Country at Wolverhampton in 2024

CrossCountry's Class 221 units operate alongside Class 220 units on the routes inherited from Virgin CrossCountry. Since these routes are not cleared for tilting operation (with the exception of Wolverhampton to Stockport), in 2008 the tilting equipment was locked out of use and shortly afterwards was isolated altogether, replacing the hydraulic rams with fixed tie-bars. This change was made to improve reliability and reduce maintenance costs. In 2024, seven Class 221 units were transferred from Avanti West Coast.

In October 2026 it was announced that Cross Country are to receive the 6 stored units and the two units with Grand Central.

=== Grand Central ===
In June 2023, it was announced that Grand Central would be leasing two Class 221 units (numbers 221142 and 221143) for use on services between London Kings Cross and Bradford Interchange.

The units first entered service with Grand Central in 2023.

=== East Midlands Railway ===
Due to issues currently ongoing with the delivery and roll-out of the Class 810 units, from 14 December 2026, East Midlands Railway will be operating two Class 221 units, which have been sub-leased from Grand Central, in order to boost capacity from London St Pancras to Sheffield and Nottingham. This is to be on a short-term basis, with the two units being coupled up to form one 10-car unit.

== Accidents and incidents ==
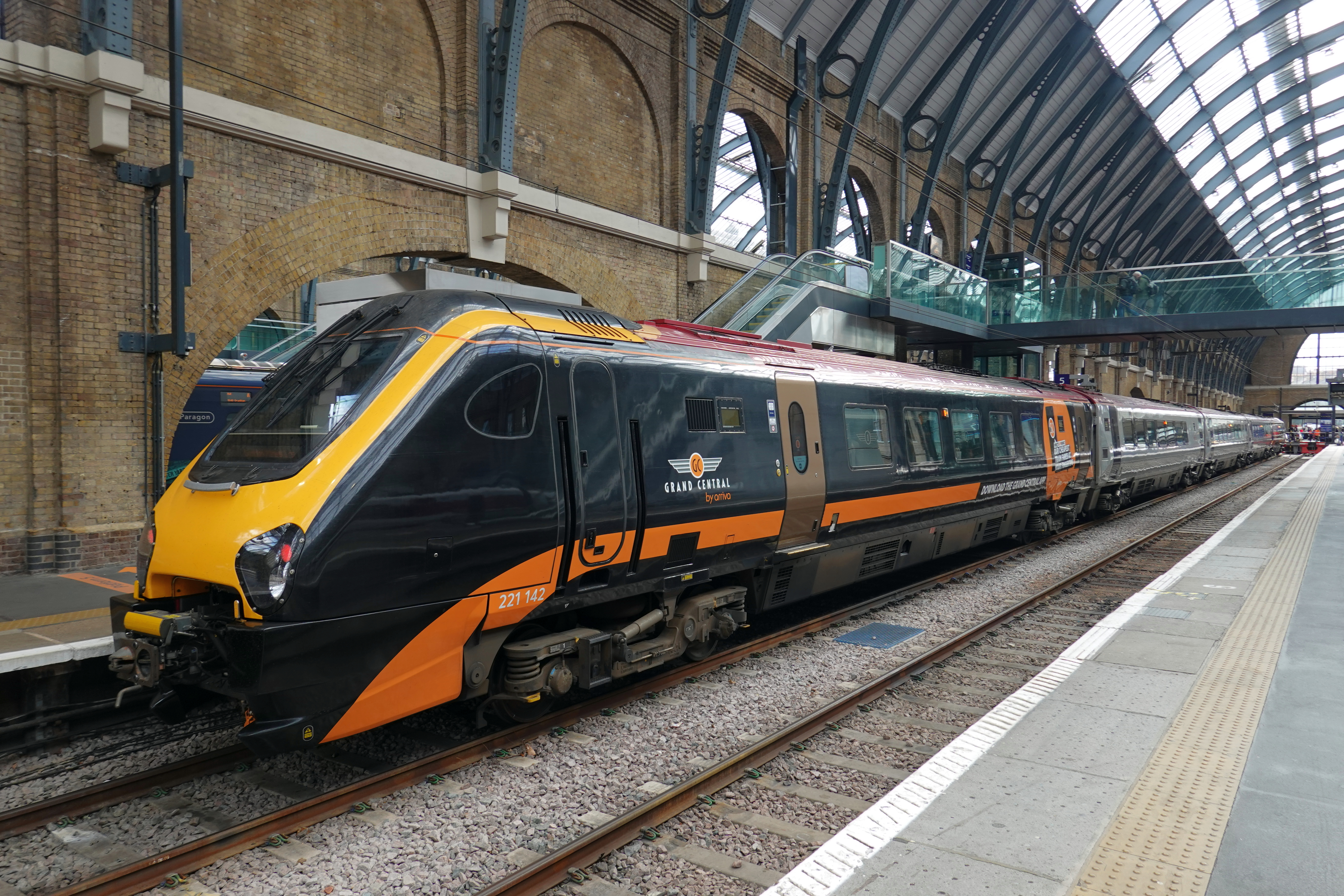
Grand Central Class 221 at London Kings Cross

When first introduced, Class 221 units would frequently be stopped due to waves breaking over the sea wall at Dawlish in storm conditions, inundating the resistor banks and causing the control software to shut down the whole train. This problem was fixed by an upgrade to the control software.

On 8 December 2005, unit 221125 suffered an exhaust fire at Starcross. Other members of the Voyager class suffered similar fires in the 2005-2006 period due to an incorrectly performed engine overhaul.

On 25 September 2006, unit 221136 collided with a car on the track at Moor Lane, Copmanthorpe, North Yorkshire. The 14:25 Plymouth to Edinburgh was decelerating on its approach to York station at 9pm when it collided with the car, which had crashed through a fence on to the line. Despite being derailed in the 100-mile-per-hour (160 km/h) crash, the train remained upright. Nobody on board was injured.

On 4 July 2009, unit 221112 was involved in a collision with a set of freight train container doors on the Eden Valley Loop at Penrith. At 16:27, Virgin Trains service 1M86 from Edinburgh to Birmingham New Street passed service 4M16, a container freight train which was in the Loop. The train struck one or both open doors of wagons 12 and or 13 of the container train. The train crew heard the impacts and stopped to report the damage to their control at 16:28. The train suffered damage to all cars consisting of scratching to bodywork, in particular the doors, as well as severe damage to one door step. The Super Voyager was one of three trains to be damaged by the container doors; a Class 390 and a Class 185 were also involved.

Ex-Avanti West Coast Class 221 in storage at Derby Litchurch in 2025

On 20 November 2013, a Virgin Super Voyager (unit 221105) overran the platform and ran into the buffers at Chester. One passenger was taken to hospital. The RAIB report concluded that this was due to exceptionally low adhesion between wheels and rails, combined with the train's sanding system being inadequate. The report recommended that the sanding equipment on the class be upgraded.

In June 2014, one vehicle in CrossCountry unit 220007 was damaged after it caught fire at Eastleigh Works.

== Fleet details ==
Class	Operator	Qty.	Year built	Cars per unit	Unit numbers
221	Grand Central	2	2001–2002	5	221142–221143
221	CrossCountry	32	2001–2002	5	221107–221135, 221137–221139
221	Stored	6	2001–2002	5	221101–221106

=== Vehicle numbering ===
Individual vehicles, as-built, were numbered in the ranges as follows:

Vehicle Units	DMSL	MSRB	MSL(A)	MSL(B)	DMFL
221101–221140	60351–60390	60751–60790	60951–60990	60851–60890	60451–60490
221141–221144	60391–60394	60791–60794	60991-60994	—	60491–60494

=== Named units ===
All units have received names:

- 221101 Louis Bleriot (de-named)
- 221102 John Cabot (de-named)
- 221103 Christopher Columbus (de-named)
- 221104 Sir John Franklin (de-named)
- 221105 William Baffin (de-named)
- 221106 William Barents (de-named)
- 221107 Sir Martin Frobisher (de-named)
- 221108 Sir Ernest Shackleton (de-named)
- 221109 Marco Polo (de-named)
- 221110 James Cook (de-named)
- 221111 Roald Amundsen (de-named)
- 221112 Ferdinand Magellen (de-named)
- 221113 Sir Walter Raleigh (de-named)
- 221114 Royal Air Force Centerary (Formerly Sir Francis Drake)
- 221115 Polmadie Depot (Formerly Sir Francis Chichester) (de-named)
- 221116 City of Bangor/Dinas Bangor (Formerly David Livingston)
- 221117 The Wrekin Giant (Formerly Sir Henry Morton Stanley) (de-named)
- 221118 Mungo Park (de-named)
- 221119 Amelia Earhart (de-named)
- 221120 Amy Johnson (de-named)
- 221121 Charles Darwin (de-named)
- 221122 Doctor Who (de-named)
- 221123 Henry Hudson
- 221124 Charles Lindbergh (de-named)
- 221125 Henry the Navigator (de-named)
- 221126 Captain Robbert Scot (de-named)
- 221127 Wright Brothers (de-named)
- 221128 Captain John Smith (de-named)
- 221129 George Vancouver (de-named)
- 221130 Michael Palin (de-named)
- 221131 Edgar Evans (de-named)
- 221132 William Speirs Bruce (de-named)
- 221133 Alexander Selkirk (de-named)
- 221134 Mary Kingsley (de-named)
- 221135 Donald Campbell (de-named)
- 221136 Yuri Gagarin (de-named)
- 221137 Mayflower Pilgrims (de-named)
- 221138 Thor Heyerdahl (denamed)
- 221139 Leif Erikson (de-named)
- 221140 Vasco de Gama (de-named)
- 221141 Amerigo Vespucci (de-named)
- 221142 Bombardier Voyager (Formerly Matthew Flinders) (de-named)
- 221143 Auguste Picard (de-named)
- 221144 Bombardier Voyager (Formerly Prince Madoc) (de-named)

== See also ==
- List of high-speed trains
- Class 222 Meridian
