= PBKA =

High-speed train type

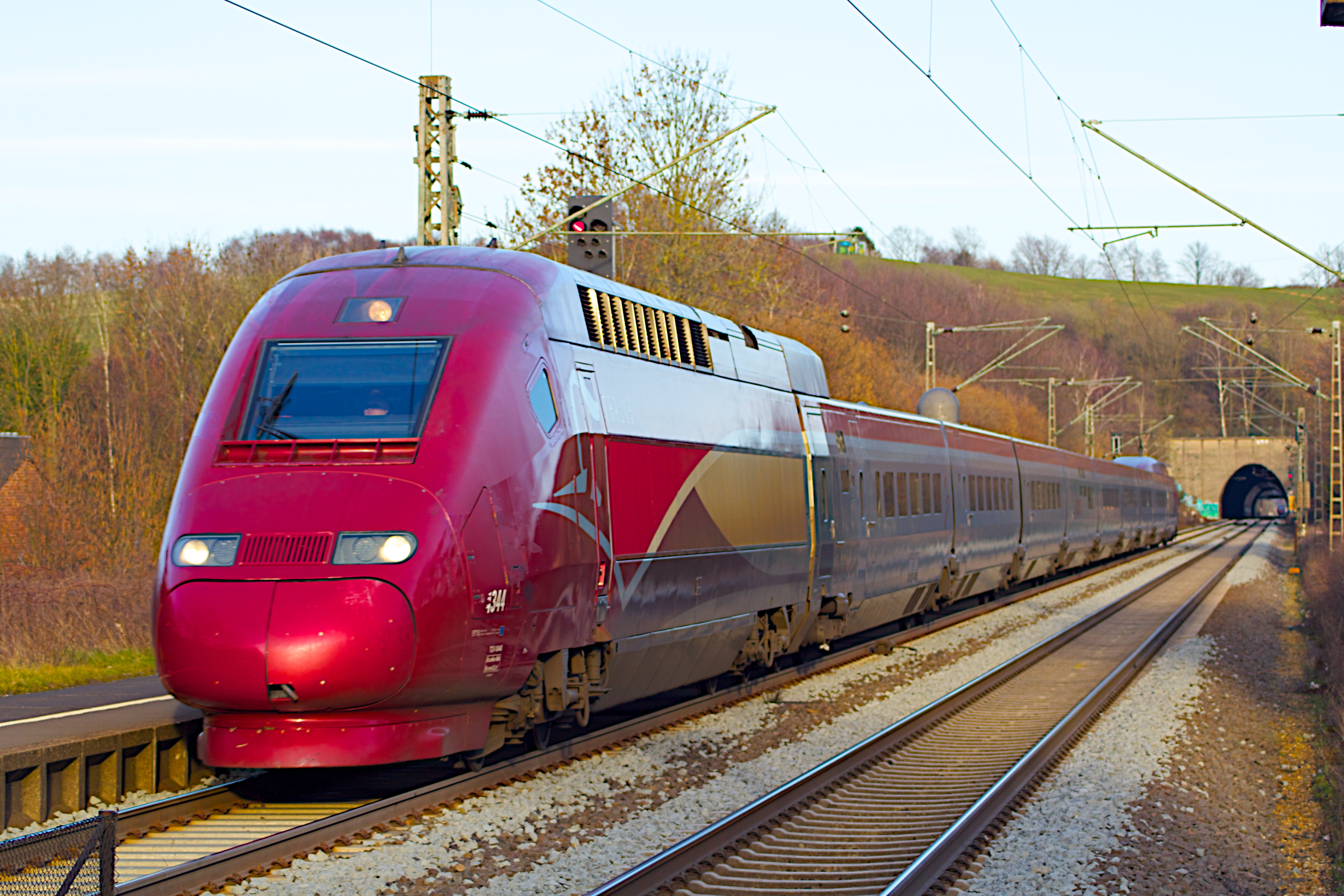
- PBKA at Eilendorf.

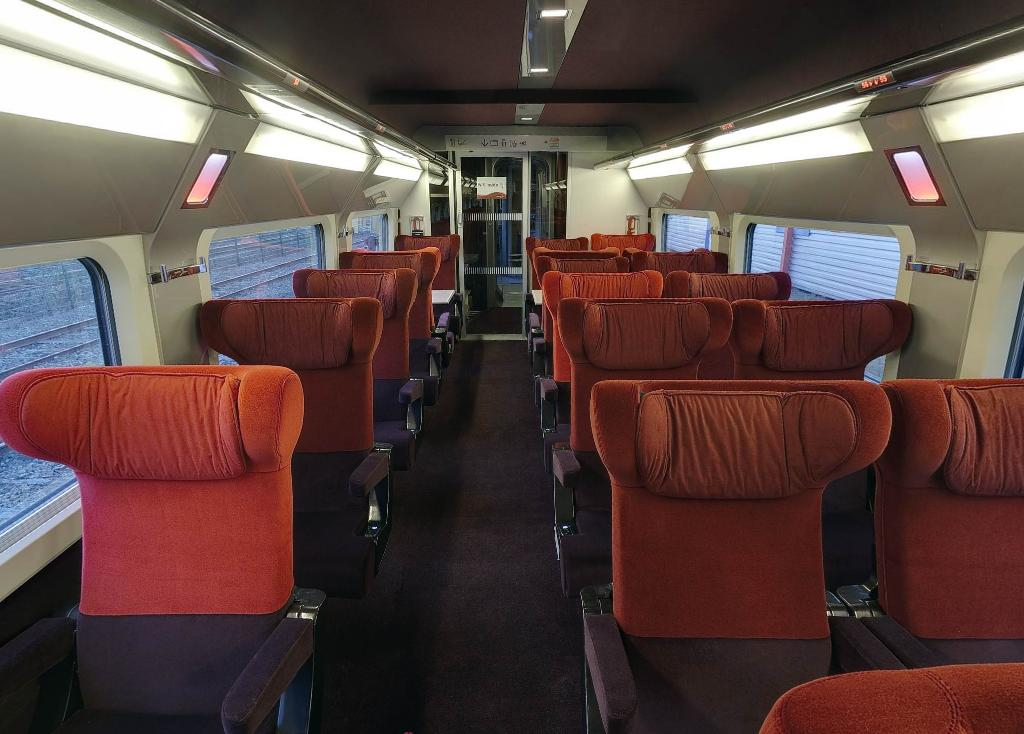
- Interior of Comfort (1st class) coach.
- Stock type: Electric multiple unit
- In service: 1998–present
- Manufacturer: GEC-Alsthom
- Family name: TGV
- Constructed: 1995–1998
- Number built: 17 trainsets
- Formation: 2 power cars + 8 passenger cars
- Fleet numbers: 4301–4307 (funded by SNCB); 4321–4322 (funded by DB); 4331–4332 (funded by NS); 4341–4346 (funded by SNCF)
- Capacity: 404 seats (120 1st class, 284 2nd class including tip up seats); Ruby: 401 seats
- Operator: Eurostar

Specifications
- Train length: 200 m (656 ft 2 in)
- Maximum speed: Design: 320 km/h (200 mph); On 25 kV AC: 300 km/h (190 mph); On 15 kV AC: 200 km/h (120 mph); On DC: 220 km/h (140 mph)
- Weight: 383 t (844,000 lb)
- Traction system: GEC-Alsthom thyristor-CSI
- Traction motors: GEC-Alsthom SM 47 (a.k.a. Holec SMT67/39.5-06)
- Power output: On 25 kV AC: 8,800 kW (11,800 hp); On 15 kV AC: 5,160 kW (6,920 hp); On DC: 3,680 kW (4,930 hp)
- Electric systems: Overhead line: 25 kV 50 Hz AC; 15 kV 16.7 Hz AC; 1,500 V DC; 3,000 V DC
- Current collection: Pantograph
- UIC classification: Bo′Bo′+2′(2)′(2)′(2)′(2)′(2)′(2)′(2)′2′+Bo′Bo′
- Safety systems: ERTMS level 2, TVM-430, KVB, ATB
- Track gauge: 1,435 mm (4 ft 8 1/2 in) standard gauge

PBKA is a high-speed trainset, built by the French manufacturer Alstom (then known as GEC-Alsthom) for international services operated by Thalys, which later merged with Eurostar. The designation "PBKA" refers to the original planned routes linking Paris, Brussels, Cologne (Köln), and Amsterdam.

The PBKA belongs to the TGV family of trainsets and was designed to operate across multiple national railway networks. Each unit is equipped to run under four electrification systems: 25 kV 50 Hz AC (France), 3,000 V DC (Belgium), 1,500 V DC (the Netherlands and parts of France), and 15 kV 16.7 Hz AC (Germany).

The PBKA was originally intended to serve as the sole rolling stock for Thalys, but due to the cost and complexity of its quadri-current capability, seven simpler tri-current versions, the PBA, was also ordered. The PBA omits equipment for operation under Germany's 15 kV AC system. The two types are interoperable and can operate in multiple when coupled together.

Each PBKA set is 200 metres (660 ft) long and weighs about 383 tonnes (844,000 lb). The trains comprise two power cars and eight passenger coaches—three first class, one bar, and four second class—offering 404 seats in total (120 in first class and 284 in second class).

Maximum operating speeds and power output vary by voltage: up to 300 kilometres per hour (190 mph) with 8,800 kilowatts (11,800 hp) under 25 kV AC, 200 km/h (120 mph) with 5,160 kW (6,920 hp) under 15 kV AC, and 220 km/h (140 mph) with 3,680 kW (4,930 hp) under 1,500 or 3,000 V DC.

A total of 17 PBKA trainsets were built between 1995 and 1998. Of these, nine were funded by the National Railway Company of Belgium, six by SNCF of France, two by Deutsche Bahn of Germany, and two by Nederlandse Spoorwegen of the Netherlands.

== See also ==
- SNCF TGV POS
- KTX-Sancheon
- List of high-speed trains
