= Belgian Railways Class 26 =

Class 26
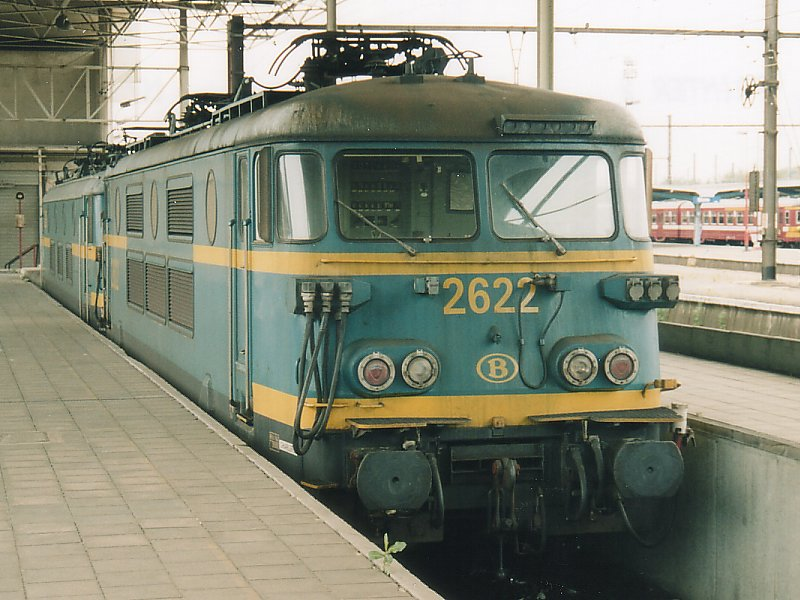
- Locomotive 2622 at Mons
Type and origin
- Power type: Electric
- Builder: BN/ACEC
- Build date: 1964–1971
- Total produced: 35
Specifications
- Configuration
  - AAR: B-B
  - UIC: B′B′
- Gauge: 1,435 mm (4 ft 8 1/2 in) standard gauge
- Driver dia.: 1,150 mm (45.3 in)
- Length: 17.25 m (56 ft 7 in)
- Loco weight: 83 t (81.69 long tons; 91.49 short tons)
- Electric system/s: 3000 V DC
- Current pickup(s): Pantograph
Performance figures
- Maximum speed: 130 km/h (81 mph)
- Power output: 2,470 kW (3,312 hp) continuous 2,590 kW (3,473 hp) one hour
- Tractive effort: 135 kN (30,000 lbf)
Career
- Operators: SNCB/NMBS
- Class: 26
- Numbers: 2601–2635
- Disposition: Scrapped

NMBS/SNCB Class 26 are single voltage (3000 volts DC) locomotives that were designed as freight locomotives. They later started working passenger trains as the electrification was expanded. A batch of five prototypes were delivered in 1964 as Type 126, numbered 126.001-126.005. 20 more were ordered around 1968, to be numbered 126.101-126.120. The final 15 arrived in 1971 and just missed getting six figure fleet numbers, carrying the numbers 2621-2635 from the factory. Actual original numbering turned out to be 126.001-126.005 (later 2601-2605), 126.101-126.120 (later 2606-2620) and 2621-2635. They had nothing in common with earlier Types 122, 123, 125, and 140.

Type 126 was the result of an order from NMBS/SNCB to BN in 1964 for 5 prototype electric locomotives that would be more powerful than all previous types. Additional weight was designed in at the start to increase tractive effort as with Type 123. Although Type 126 certainly looks Belgian with a strong resemblance to Type 150/Class 15, it is in fact an SNCF Class BB 9400 under the skin. The main internal difference between the two was BB 9400 ran on 1500 volts DC and Type 126 ran on 3000 volts DC. Most electrical components either came directly from France or were license-built in Belgium. These locos also had wheelslip detection. When the production series of locomotives were ordered they incorporated what NMBS/SNCB had learned from the 5 prototypes. The five prototypes were rebuilt in 1976-1977 to bring them up to standard with the production batch, which had a number of small improvements. Unusually for NMBS/SNCB, the French heritage of these locomotives got them classified as B′B′ rather than Bo′Bo′, being fitted with licence-built Schneider monomotor bogies.

The locos were not very well-liked by their drivers and maintainers. Unlike Types 122, 123, 125 and 140 they were not indestructible. Worse yet, the design of the bogies made it impossible to change the trailing (closest to the middle of the loco) brake shoes on each bogie without lifting the locomotive, which was time-consuming. NMBS/SNCB decided to stop replacing them to avoid the large amount of extra time and labor involved in a normally simple task. This was not a problem when they were pulling a train but there were several incidents that came close to becoming accidents when running light. One happened near Namur and it was in the local press the following day and in the railfan press in the following editions. Another negative point was this small class had almost no commonality of spares with earlier versions. The only exception seems to have been the cab assembly, shared with Type 150/Class 15.

All were delivered in dark green. Some were repainted in yellow and blue to increase visibility. All ended up blue when NMBS/SNCB decided that yellow locomotives needed to be washed more often than dark ones, a lesson since forgotten given the livery of Classes 13, 18², 19², AM96, AR41 and M6 and updated M5 coaching stock. 2627 was the last yellow electric on the SNCB. It was painted blue as were all other yellow and all green locomotives.

They were later fitted for multiple working and worked with each other and with Class 23. All class 26s were taken out of the service in December 2011.

Near the end of their service lives, Class 26s found themselves being used in a novel way. A top and tail pair of them worked several daily returns from Louvain-la-Neuve-Université to Binche and return on an Inter Regional service via Brussels with a rake of M6 double deck stock in between. The reason was to put more seats on the busy line from Ottignies to Brussels during the peak commuting hours. This worked because a pair of Class 26s had almost the same power (7000 HP) as a single Class 13 or Class 20.

Locomotive 2629 has been preserved by the PFT-TSP railway preservation group.
