= Nicaise et Delcuve =

- Industry: Metallurgy
- Founded: 1867
- Successor: Ateliers du Nord de la France et Nicaise et Delcuve (1908); La Brugeoise et Nicaise et Delcuve (1913)
- Headquarters: La Louvière, Belgium

Nicaise et Delcuve was a Belgian metal engineering company based in La Louvière, Belgium.

== History ==
In 1855, in La Louvière, the company Parmentier, Nicaise et Cie. was formed, including various mechanical engineering factories from the région du Centre in the province of Hainaut including the SA de Forges, usines et fonderies de Haine-Saint-Pierre, a locomotive builder.

In 1867, the partnership Nicaise et Delcuve was created with a capital of 2.5 million francs from Parmentier, Nicaise et Cie.

In 1908, the company was absorbed into Ateliers de Construction du Nord de la France, both being part of the holding group organised under the name Trust Métallurgique Belge-Français forming Ateliers du Nord de la France et Nicaise et Delcuve. In 1913, the Trust Métallurgique reorganised its holdings, separating French and Belgian companies; the Nicase et Delcuve factories merged with the factories of "La Brugeoise", forming La Brugeoise et Nicaise et Delcuve.
