= British Rail Class 220 =

British Diesel-electric multiple unit

British Rail Class 220 Voyager
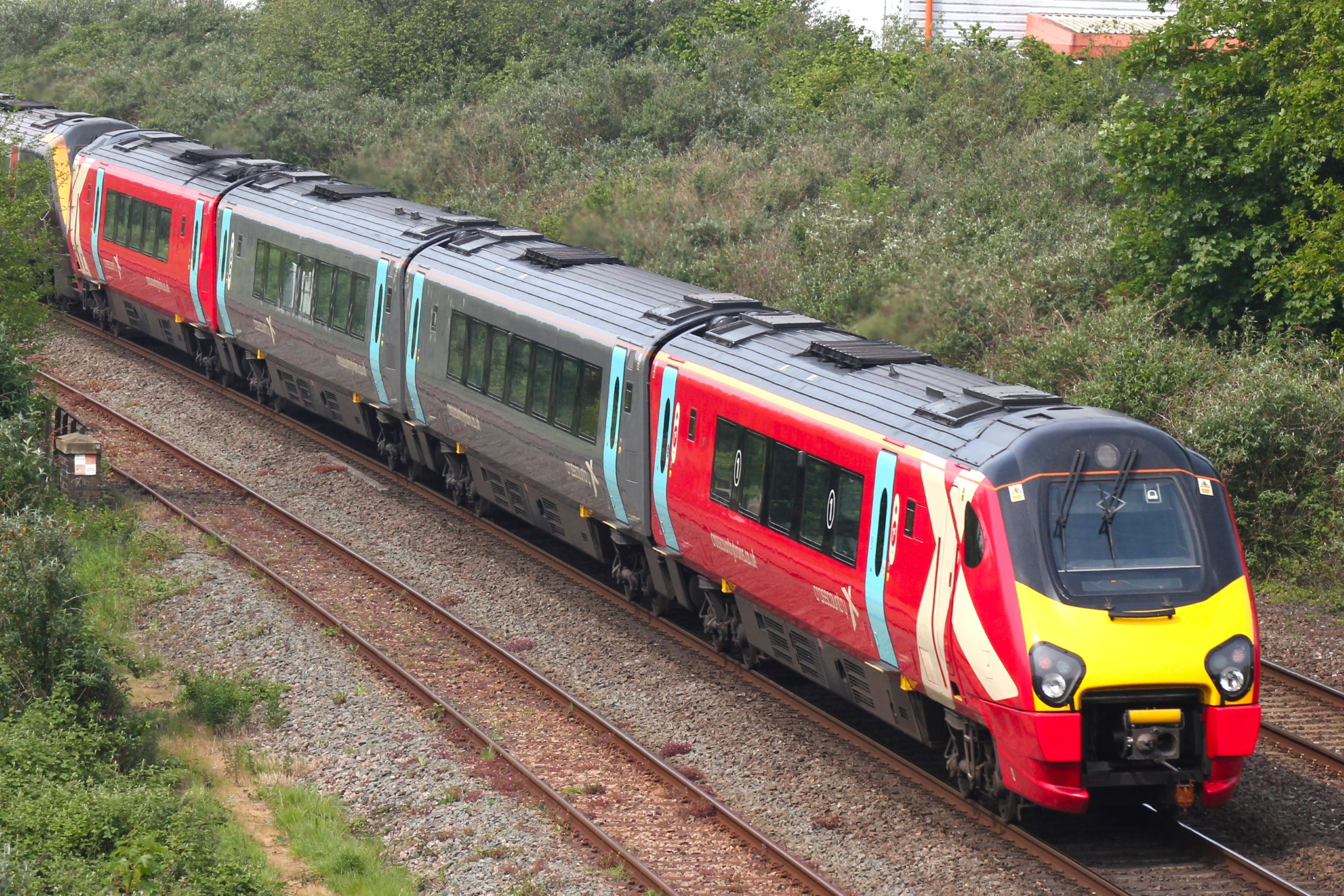
- A Refurbished CrossCountry Class 220 passing through Norton Fitzwarren near Taunton in 2026.

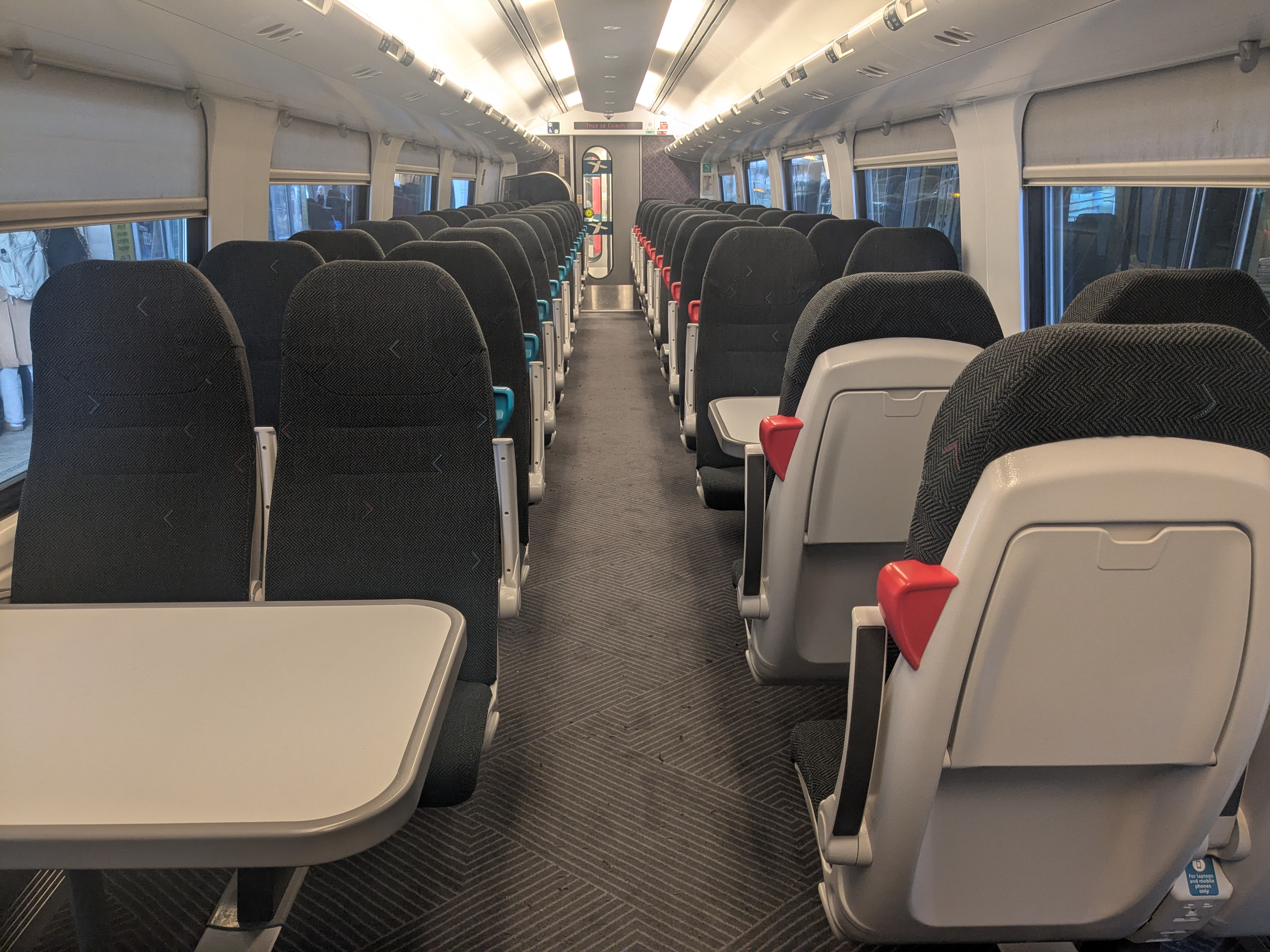
- Refurbished standard class interior
- In service: 21 May 2001–present
- Manufacturer: Bombardier Transportation
- Built at: Bruges, Belgium; Horbury railway works, United Kingdom
- Family name: Voyager
- Replaced: InterCity 125; Class 47; Mark 2 carriages; Class 158
- Constructed: 2000–2001
- Number built: 34
- Formation: 4 cars per unit
- Fleet numbers: 220001–220034
- Capacity: 174 standard class, 26 first class
- Owner: Beacon Rail
- Operator: CrossCountry

Specifications
- Car body construction: Steel
- Car length: 23.85 m (78 ft 3 in) (driving cars) or 22.82 m (74 ft 10 in) (intermediate cars)
- Width: 2.73 m (8 ft 11 in)
- Wheel diameter: 780–716 mm (30.7–28.2 in) (maximum–minimum)
- Wheelbase: Bogies: 2.250 m (7 ft 4.6 in)
- Maximum speed: 125 mph (200 km/h)
- Weight: 185.6 t (182.7 long tons; 204.6 short tons) per unit
- Traction system: One per car, Alstom alternator, 750v asynchronous ONIX IGBT drive with AGATE traction control
- Prime mover: 4 × Cummins QSK19-R (one per car)
- Engine type: Inline-6 turbo-diesel
- Displacement: 19 L (1,159 cu in) per engine
- Traction motors: Asynchronous traction motors (2 per car)
- Power output: 559 kW (750 hp) per engine at 1,800 rpm; 350 kW (470 hp) per traction motor
- Transmission: Diesel-electric
- UIC classification: 1A′A1′+1A′A1′+1A′A1′+1A′A1′
- Bogies: Bombardier B5005
- Braking systems: Rheostatic and electro-pneumatic
- Safety systems: AWS, TPWS
- Coupling system: Dellner 12
- Multiple working: Within class, and with Class 221
- Track gauge: 1,435 mm (4 ft 8 1/2 in) standard gauge

The British Rail Class 220 Voyager is a class of diesel-electric high-speed multiple unit passenger trains built in Belgium by Bombardier Transportation in 2000 and 2001. They were introduced in 2001 to replace the 20-year-old InterCity 125 and almost 40-year-old Class 47-hauled Mark 2 fleets operating on the Cross Country Route. They were initially operated by Virgin CrossCountry and since 2007 have been operated by CrossCountry.

== Technical details ==
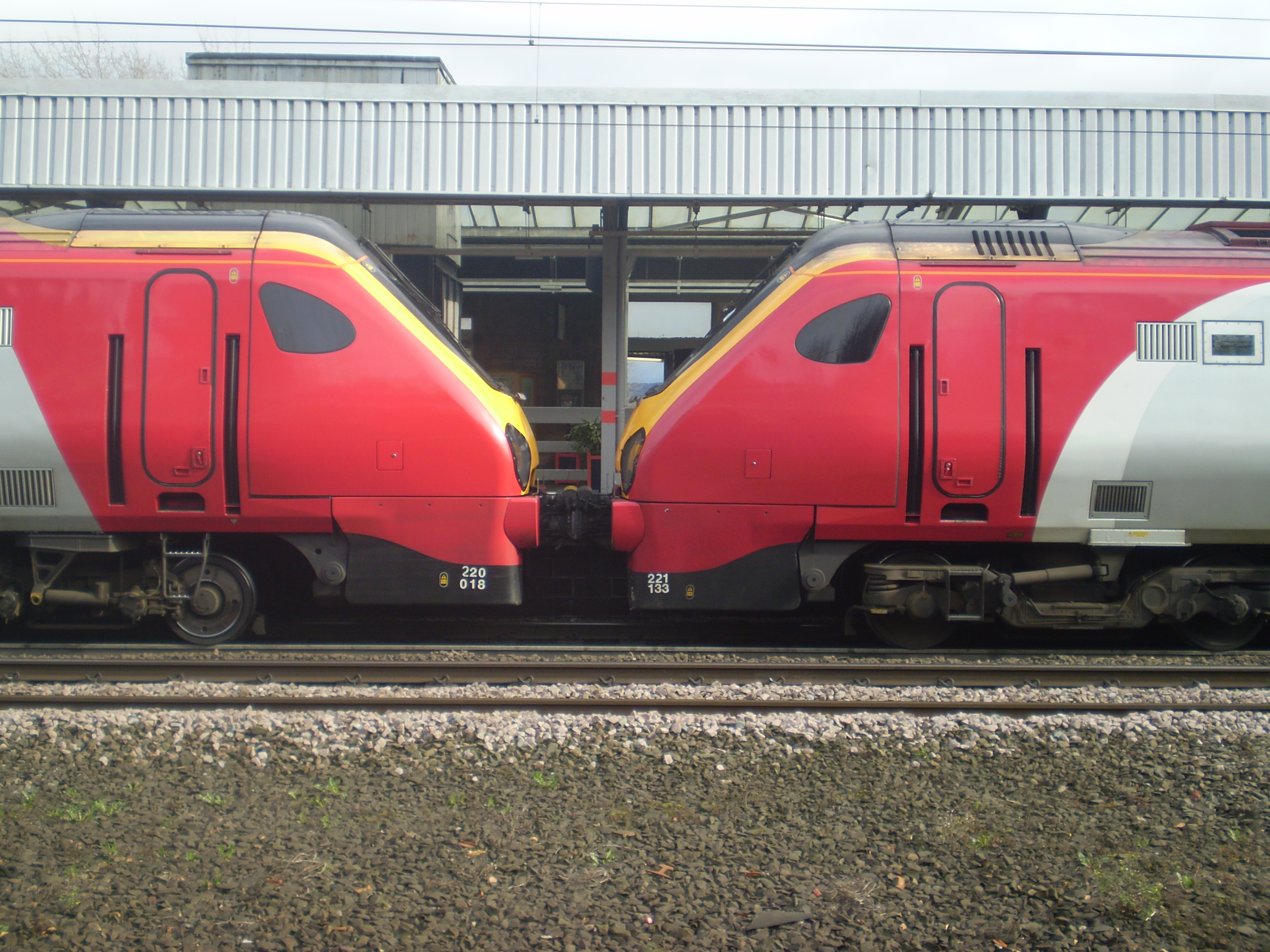
Classes 220 (left) and 221 (right) at Durham, showing the differing bogie designs

All coaches are equipped with a Cummins QSK19 diesel engine of 559 kW (750 hp) at 1,800 rpm. These power a generator which supplies current to motors driving two axles per coach, with one axle per bogie powered.

Voyagers have both air and rheostatic brakes. They are fitted with Dellner couplers, like the Class 222 operated by East Midlands Railway and the Class 390 Pendolino electric trains used by Avanti West Coast, meaning they can be coupled in rescue/recovery mode (air brake only) in the event of a failure. 220s and 221s can also be easily assisted by Dellner fitted Class 57s (Thunderbirds) in the event of a failure. By use of adaptor couplings a failed 220 or 221 can also be assisted by any air braked locomotive.

The Class 220s and closely related Class 222s have B5005 bogies, which are distinctive as they are of inside-frame design and so the axles are supported by bearings behind the wheels, meaning the outside face of the wheel is visible. The related tilting Class 221 Super Voyager has outside-frame bogies and hence a more conventional appearance.

The Class 220s operate in four-coach sets with a carriage mass of between 45 and 48 tonnes and a total train weight of 185.6 tonnes, a top speed of 125 mph (200 km/h), and a maximum range of approximately 1,350 miles (2,170 km) between each refuelling. Their route availability is very good being RA 2 - in part due to the lightweight bogie design.

Class 220 units are fitted with an AB Hoses variable rate sanding system.

All Voyagers are maintained at the dedicated Central Rivers TMD near Burton-on-Trent.

== Current operations ==
Class 220 at Kings Sutton in 2001

All units are owned by Beacon Rail, having been purchased from Voyager Rail Leasing, a consortium of Lloyds Banking Group and Angel Trains, in 2017. They are leased to the train operating companies.

Virgin CrossCountry was the sole operator of Class 220 Voyager trains when they were introduced in 2001. When the Cross Country Route franchise was transferred to Arriva CrossCountry in November 2007, most of the Voyager fleet was transferred with it, and by the end of 2007 CrossCountry was the sole operator of Class 220 units.

Class 220 units often operate in multiple with Class 221 units, which are mechanically similar except for their bogies and have the same coupler type.

In 2024, CrossCountry announced that it had contracted Alstom to undertake refurbishment of the Class 220 and Class 221 fleets, with the first refurbished unit being unveiled in February 2026.

== Fleet details ==
Class	Operator	Number	Year built	Cars per Set	Unit No.
220	CrossCountry	34	2000–2001	4	220001–034

== Named units ==
Under Virgin Cross Country, all units were named, however most have since been denamed. Their naming goes as follows:

- 220001 Maiden Voyager, it was later re-named Somerset Voyager.
- 220002 Forth Voyager.
- 220003 Solent Voyager.
- 220004 New Dawn, it was later re-named Cumbrian Voyager.
- 220005 Guildford Voyager.
- 220006 Clyde Voyager.
- 220007 Thames Voyager.
- 220008 Draig Gymreig/Welsh Dragon.
- 220009 Gatwick Voyager, it was later re-named Hixon January 6th 1968.
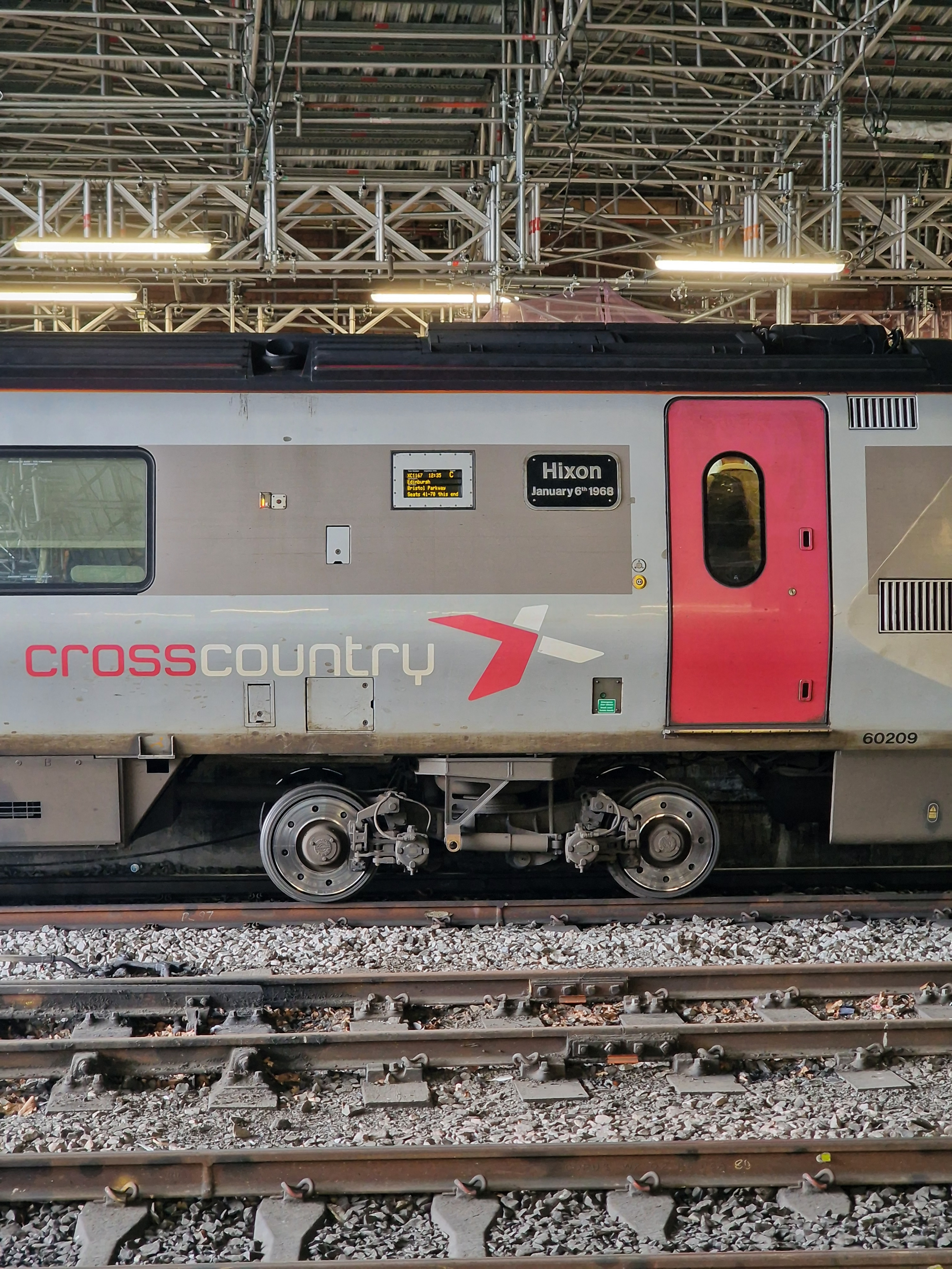
  220009 Hixon at Bristol Temple Meads
- 220010 Ribble Voyager.
- 220011 Tyne Voyager.
- 220012 Lancashire Voyager.
- 220013 Gwibiwr De Cymru/South Wales Voyager.
- 220014 South Yorkshire Voyager.
- 220015 Solway Voyager.
- 220016 Midland Voyager, later renamed Voyager 20.
- 220017 Bombardier Voyager.
- 220018 Central News, it was later re-named Dorset Voyager.
- 220019 Mersey Voyager.
- 220020 Wessex Voyager.
- 220021 Blackpool Voyager, it was later re-named Staffordshire Voyager.
- 220022 Brighton Voyager.
- 220023 Mancunian Voyager.
- 220024 Sheffield Voyager.
- 220025 Virgin Voyager, it was later re-named Severn Voyager.
- 220026 Stagecoach Voyager.
- 220027 Avon Voyager.
- 220028 Black Country Voyager.
- 220029 Vyajer Kernewek/Cornish Voyager.
- 220030 Devon Voyager.
- 220031 Tay Voyager.
- 220032 Grampian Voyager.
- 220033 Fife Voyager.
- 220034 Yorkshire Voyager.

== Accidents and incidents ==
Units have sometimes been stopped by salt water, when storm-driven waves broke over the train at Dawlish in south Devon and inundated the resistor banks, causing the control software to shut down. This problem was fixed by an upgrade to the control software.

There were a number of exhaust fires on the Voyager class during 2005–2006 due to incorrect fitting of equipment during overhauls. Fires occurred at Starcross (Class 221), Newcastle, and on 19 January 2006 at Congleton.

== See also ==
- List of high-speed trains
