= Class 810 =

Class 810 may refer to:

- British Rail Class 810
- ČD Class 810
