= Holec =

Holec is a surname. Notable people with the surname include:

- Dominik Holec (born 1994), Slovak footballer
- Josif Holec (1835–1898), Serbian military doctor
- Miroslav Holec (born 1987), Czech ice hockey forward
- Wilhelm Holec (1914–1944), Austrian footballer
