= 2002 New Year Honours =

British royal recognitions

New Years' Honours are announced on or around the date of the New Year in Australia, Canada, New Zealand and the United Kingdom. The dates vary, both from year to year and from country to country. All are published in supplements to the London Gazette and many are conferred by the monarch (or their representative) some time after the date of the announcement, particularly for those service people on active duty.

This page lists those awards announced in the 2002 New Year's honours lists for the United Kingdom, Barbados, The Bahamas, Grenada, Papua New Guinea, Tuvalu, Saint Vincent and the Grenadines, Belize, and Saint Kitts and Nevis.

== United Kingdom ==
=== Knights Bachelor ===
- Patrick John Armstrong, for services to the Police.
- John Lionel Beckwith, C.B.E., for services to Youth Sport.
- Albert Bore, Leader, Birmingham City Council. For services to Local Government.
- Professor Richard John Brook, O.B.E., formerly Chief Executive, Engineering and Physical Sciences Research Council. For services to Science and Engineering.
- Michael Sydney Buckley, Parliamentary Commissioner for Administration and Health Service Commissioner for England, Wales and Scotland.
- Anthony Thomas Burden, Q.P.M., Chief Constable, South Wales Police. For services to the Police.
- de Vic Graham Carey, Bailiff of Guernsey. For services to the Crown.
- Professor Graeme Robertson Dawson Catto. For services to Medicine and to Medical Education.
- Timothy Peter Plint Clifford, Director-General, National Galleries of Scotland. For services to the Arts.
- Professor Ronald Urwick Cooke, Vice-Chancellor, University of York. For services to Higher Education.
- Professor Bernard Crick. For services to Citizenship in Schools and to Political Studies.
- Professor Liam Joseph Donaldson, Chief Medical Officer for England, Department of Health.
- Charles Brandon Gough, lately Chairman, Review Body on Doctors' and Dentists' Remuneration. For public service.
- Nicholas Thomas Grimshaw, C.B.E. For services to Architecture.
- Iain Robert Hall, Headteacher, Parrs Wood Technology College, Manchester. For services to Education.
- Professor Gabriel Horn, F.R.S. For services to Neurobiology and to the Advancement of Scientific Research.
- Professor Ian McColl Kennedy. For services to Bioethics and to Medical Law.
- Ben Kingsley. Actor. For services to Drama.
- Terence Patrick Leahy, Chief Executive, Tesco plc. For services to Food Retailing.
- Professor Alistair George James MacFarlane, C.B.E., F.R.S., Rector, UHI Millennium Institute. For services to Education.
- Graham John Melmoth, Chief Executive Co-operative Group (CWS) Ltd. For services to the Retail Industry.
- Edward Benjamin Crofton Osmotherly, C.B., lately chairman, Commission for Local Administration in England. For services to Local Government.
- Alan William Parker, C.B.E., Film Director and Chairman, Film Council. For services to the Film Industry.
- Robin Keith Saxby, Executive Chairman, ARM Holdings plc. For services to the Information Technology Industry.
- Professor Martin Nicholas Sweeting, O.B.E., F.R.S., Chief Executive, Surrey Satellite Technology Ltd and Director, Surrey Space Centre. For services to Microsatellite Engineering.
- Jimmy Leslie Ronald Young, C.B.E.. For services to Radio Broadcasting.

=== Order of the Bath ===
==== Knights Commander of the Bath (K.C.B.) ====
- Edward George Caldwell, C.B., First Parliamentary Counsel, Office of the Parliamentary Counsel.
- John Michael Davies, Clerk of the Parliaments, House of Lords.
- Kevin Reginald Tebbit, C.M.G., Permanent Secretary, Ministry of Defence.

==== Companions of the Bath (C.B.) ====
- Ian David Fauset, Executive Director, Defence Procurement Agency, Ministry of Defence.
- Timothy James Flesher, Deputy Chairman, HM Board of Inland Revenue.
- Jeremy John Heywood, Principal Private Secretary to the Prime Minister.
- Roger de Lacy Holmes, Chief Executive and Deputy Master, Royal Mint.
- Jeffrey Jacobs, Executive Director, Policy and Partnerships, Greater London Authority.
- Nicholas James Kroll, Corporate Services Director, Department for Culture, Media and Sport.
- Richard Hill Mackenzie, for public service.
- Ian Bernard Vaughan Magee, Chief Executive, Court Service, Lord Chancellor's Department.
- Raymond Noel McAfee, Director, Regional Business Services, HM Board of Customs and Excise.
- George Alexander McCorkell, Director, Pensions Change Programme, Department for Work and Pensions.
- Kathryn Mary Stuart Morton, Solicitor and Director General, Legal Services, Department for Environment, Food and Rural Affairs.
- Jonathan Page Spencer, Director General, Business Competitiveness, Department of Trade and Industry.
- Brian Arthur Edward Taylor, lately Director General, Civilian Personnel, Ministry of Defence.

=== Order of St Michael and St George ===
==== Companions of St Michael and St George (C.M.G.) ====
- Edward John Rankin Scott, chairman of John Swire and Sons Ltd. For services to International Trade.

=== Royal Victorian Order ===
==== Knights Commander of the Royal Victorian Order (K.C.V.O.) ====
- Rear Admiral Patrick Barton Rowe, C.B.E., L.V.O., Deputy Master and chairman of the Corporate Board of the Corporation of Trinity House.
- Lt Col Robert Christie Stewart, C.B.E., T.D., formerly Lord Lieutenant of Clackmannanshire.

==== Commanders of the Royal Victorian Order (C.V.O.) ====
- Peter Scott Dunn, L.V.O. For veterinary services, the Royal Mews.
- Arthur Michael Johnstone Galsworthy, C.B.E., D.L., lately member of The Prince's Council, Duchy of Cornwall.
- John Eric Handcock, L.V.O., Honorary Secretary, The Prince Philip Trust Fund for the Royal Borough of Windsor and Maidenhead.
- Malcolm Brian Johnston Kimmins, Trustee, Ascot Authority.
- Christopher Hamilton Lloyd, L.V.O., Surveyor of The Queen's Pictures.
- Kathrin Elizabeth Thomas, J.P., lately Chairman, The Prince's Trust - Cymru.
- Colonel Greville Wyndham Tufnell, Lieutenant, The Queen's Body Guard of the Yeomen of the Guard.

==== Lieutenants of the Royal Victorian Order (L.V.O.) ====
- Nicolas Clark Adamson, O.B.E., private secretary to The Duke of Kent.
- William Backhouse, formerly Treasurer of The King's Fund.
- Col Frederic Nicolas John Davies, J.P., D.L., secretary for Appointments and chief Clerk of the Duchy of Lancaster.
- Richard Laurence Day, M.V.O., R.V.M., J.P., Chief Bookbinder of the Royal Collection.
- The Honourable Elizabeth Anne Crowther-Hunt, formerly executive director of The Prince's Trust.
- The Most Hon. The Marquess of Lansdowne, former Member of The Prince's Council, Duchy of Cornwall.
- James Oliver McDonald, M.B.E., formerly vice-chairman of the Northern Ireland Council of The Prince's Trust.
- Jonathan Spencer, M.V.O., Deputy Comptroller of the Lord Chamberlain's Office.
- Michael Stevens, finance director of the Royal Collection.
- Douglas Leonard Warner, for surveying services to Sandringham House.
- Bridget Anne Wright, M.V.O., Bibliographer of the Royal Library.

==== Members of the Royal Victorian Order (M.V.O.) ====
- Lt Col David Mitchell Anderson, O.B.E., Superintendent of the Palace of Holyroodhouse.
- Sgt Paul Leon Bazire, Royalty Protection Department, Metropolitan Police.
- John Dobson, Head Forester on the Balmoral Estate.
- Hazel Duddy, formerly head of the Royal Households Secretariat, Foreign and Commonwealth Office.
- Caroline Claire, comtesse de Guitauat, assistant to the director of the Royal Collection and Loans Officer.
- David Simon Hutson, Archivist to the Household of The Prince of Wales.
- Michael Robertson Hyde, finance director of Business in the Community.
- Cyril Arthur Littlewood, M.B.E., founder of the Young People's Trust for the Environment and Nature Conservation.
- Philippa Beris Leigh Norman, Chief Accountant in the Royal Household.
- Graham Paul Sharpe, property manager of Windsor Castle.
- Patrick William Avern Smart, special liaison manager of Jaguar Cars Limited.
- Douglas Stuart Wilson, formerly Bursar of Cumberland Lodge.

=== Royal Victorian Medal ===
==== Bar to the Royal Victorian Medal (Silver) ====
- John Alan Brown, RVM. Tractor Driver, Sandringham Estate.
- John Collings, RVM. Head Chauffeur to Queen Elizabeth The Queen Mother.
- David John Watts, RVM. Carpenter, Sandringham Estate.

==== Royal Victorian Medal (Silver) ====
- Charles Victor Brewster, manager of the Stationery and Reprographic Unit, Royal Household.
- Ernest Dennis, Chief Steward to the Lieutenant-Governor of Ontario.
- Rosemarie Ethel Farnworth, Dresser to The Princess Royal.
- Desmond Fitzgerald, formerly Parks Worker on the Crown Estate, Windsor
- Gp. Capt. Nigel Wharmby O.B.E, Station Commander of Royal Air Force Cranwell.
- Constable Robert Nicholas Grieve, Royalty Protection Department, Metropolitan Police.
- Roderick Andrew Lane, deputy head Bookbinder of the Royal Collection.
- Lindsay Henderson Masson, Estate Worker on the Balmoral Estate.
- Michael Zalec Rasser, for hairdressing services to The Princess Royal.
- Edward Patrick Richards, Night Patrolman of Buckingham Palace.
- Ronald Ernest Russell, Craft Welder of the Crown Estate.
- Anthony Michael Rutty, formerly Chauffeur and General assistant on the Sandringham Estate.
- David Scrimgeour, Gamekeeper on the Balmoral Estate.
- Roy Stannett, Parks Worker, Crown Estate, Windsor.
- Graham Bernard Sutherland, BEM, Yeoman of the Royal Cellars, Royal Household.
- Michael John Andrew Wakeham, Gentleman of the Choir, The Queen's Chapel of the Savoy.
- Timothy John Williams, Head Chauffeur to The Prince of Wales.

=== Order of the Companions of Honour (C.H.) ===
- Sir George William Langham Christie, DL. For services to Opera and to Glyndebourne Opera Festival.

=== Order of the British Empire ===
==== Knights Grand Cross of the British Empire (G.B.E.) ====
- Sir Michael Sydney Perry, C.B.E., Chairman of the Senior Salaries Review Body. For public service.
- Sir Ronald Gough Waterhouse. For public service.

==== Dame Commander of the Order of the British Empire (D.B.E.) ====
- Margaret Barbour, C.B.E., Chairman of J. Barbour and Sons Ltd., for services to Industry in North East England.
- Catherine Elizabeth Elcoat, Chief Nurse of University Hospital Birmingham NHS Foundation Trust. For services to Health Care.
- Professor Jessica Mary Rawson, C.B.E., for services to Oriental Studies.
- Sheila Ann Wallis, Headteacher of Davison High School for Girls, Worthing, West Sussex. For services to Education.

==== Commanders of the British Empire (C.B.E.) ====
- Professor Agnes Anne Jennifer Adgey. For services to Cardiology. (Lisburn, Antrim)
- Richard Van Allan. Lately Director, National Opera Studio. For services to Music. (London, SW11)
- Peter John Bareau. Chief Executive, National Savings Agency, HM Treasury. (Godalming, Surrey)
- Jayne Barnes. Director of Nursing, NHS Direct, West Yorkshire Metropolitan Ambulance Service. For services to Health Care. (Leeds, West Yorkshire)
- Professor Christine Joan Beasley. Director of Nursing, Department of Health. (London)
- Michael Beasley. Chairman, Birmingham Employers' Coalition. For services to Unemployed People. (Balsall Common, West Midlands)
- Mary Berry. For services to Plainsong and Gregorian Chant. (Cambridge, Cambridgeshire)
- Professor Carol Mary Black. For research and Clinical Care in Scleroderma and Fibrotic Disorders. (London, NW3)
- Professor Peter George Blain. Chairman, Chemical, Biological and Human Technologies Board. For services to the Ministry of Defence. (Northumberland)
- Malcolm Arthur Brinded. For services to Shell and to the Oil and Gas Industry. (Haslemere, Surrey)
- Richard Ian Case. Chairman, Westland Helicopters Ltd. For services to the Defence and Aerospace Industries. (Templecombe, Somerset)
- David John Challen. Chairman, Practitioner Panel. For services to the Financial Sector. (Twickenham, Middlesex)
- John George Harold Champ. Formerly National Chairman, Royal British Legion. For services to Ex-Servicemen and Women. (Earley, Berkshire)
- Janet Maria Soo-Chung. Chief Executive, East Riding and Hull Health Authority. For services to Health Care.
- Christian Alice Margaret Nethercote Cleland. For services to the Women's Royal Voluntary Service. (Devizes, Wiltshire)
- Peter John Connor. Divisional Manager, Financial Accounting Division, Department for Education and Skills. (Helsby, Cheshire)
- John Cushnaghan. Managing Director, Nissan Motor Manufacturing UK. For services to the Automotive Industry. (Nr Hexham, Northumberland)
- Hugh Francis Cushnahan. For services to Industry. (Virginia Water, Surrey)
- Roger John Dalley. Deputy Director General, Commonwealth War Graves Commission. (Marlow, Buckinghamshire)
- Siobhan Davies, M.B.E. Dancer and Choreographer. For services to Dance. (London, N1)
- Alexander Moore Dorrian. Head, Thales Naval Systems and Deputy Head, Thales Defence Business. For services to the Defence and Shipbuilding Industries. (London, W1Y)
- Carol Ann Duffy, O.B.E. Poet and Writer. For services to Literature. (Manchester, Greater Manchester)
- Robert Eagle. Head, National Asylum Support Service, Immigration and Nationality Directorate, Home Office. (Horsham, West Sussex)
- Paul Ennals. Chief Executive, National Children's Bureau. For services to Education. (London, N6)
- Anthony Noel Eskenzi. Chief Commoner. For services to the Corporation of London and to Youth Enterprise. (London, N20)
- Amelia Chilcott Fawcett. Managing Director, Morgan Stanley International. For services to the Finance Industry. (London, SW7)
- Ian Hamilton Finlay. For services to the Arts. (Carnwath, Lanarkshire)
- Lesley Garrett. Singer. For services to Music. (London)
- Moira Gibb. Director of Housing and Social Services, Royal Borough of Kensington and Chelsea. For services to the Social Services. (London)
- George Simon Cecil Gibson, DL. For charitable services through the Simon Gibson Charitable Trust. (Newmarket, Suffolk)
- Professor Peter Goddard, FRS. For services to Theoretical Physics. (Cambridge, Cambridgeshire)
- John Harry Goldthorpe. For services to the Advancement of Social Science. (Oxford, Oxfordshire)
- Valerie Frances Gooding. Chief Executive, BUPA. For services to Business. (East Molesey, Surrey)
- Trevor Rudolph Hall, O.B.E. Formerly Race Equality Adviser, Home Office. (Rugby, Warwickshire)
- Victor Campbell Haslett. For services to the community. (Cultra, Down)
- Michael John Hastings. Chairman, Crime Concern. For services to Crime Reduction. (Swindon, Wiltshire)
- Giles Pollock Havergal, O.B.E. Director, Citizens Theatre, Glasgow. For services to the Theatre. (Glasgow)
- Robert Cameron Heron. Head, Health Regulation Branch, Department of Health. (Leeds, West Yorkshire)
- Margaret Anne Hill. Formerly Assistant Director, HM Board of Inland Revenue. (Kent)
- Hilary Claire Hillier. Head, Transport Statistics Division, Department for Transport, Local Government and the Regions. (South Croydon, Surrey)
- Raymond Hinchcliffe. Head of Information Services, Department for Education and Skills. (Sheffield, South Yorkshire)
- Hugh Halcro-Johnston, JP. Convenor, Orkney Islands Council. For services to Local Government. (Orphir, Orkney)
- Professor Eve Cordelia Johnstone. Professor of Psychiatry, University of Edinburgh. For services to Psychiatry. (Edinburgh)
- Huw Jones. Senior Civil Servant, Ministry of Defence. (London)
- DeAnne Shirley Julius. For services to the Monetary Policy Committee. (Fetcham, Surrey)
- Robert Edwin Turnbull Kay. Chairman, Association of Scottish Colleges. For services to Further Education. (Eyemouth, Berwickshire)
- Julie Ann Kenny. Chair, Regional Industrial Development Board. For services to Industry in Yorkshire and Humberside. (Sheffield, South Yorkshire)
- Professor David James Kerr. Rhodes Professor of Therapeutics and Cancer Medicine, University of Oxford. For services to Cancer Research. (Knightwick, Worcestershire)
- David William Lazenby. Director, Standards. For services to the British Standards Institution. (Woking, Surrey)
- Michael Edward Lewer, QC. For services to the Criminal Injuries Compensation Board Appeals Panel. (London, N4)
- Anthony Robert Lewis, DL. For services to Sport, to Broadcasting and to Wales. (Near Llantrisant, Mid Glamorgan)
- Lennox Claudius Lewis, M.B.E. For services to Boxing. (London, W1R)
- Professor Steven Victor Ley, FRS. President, Royal Society of Chemistry. For services to Chemistry. (Cambridge, Cambridgeshire)
- Penelope Margaret Lively, O.B.E. Writer. For services to Literature. (London, W1F)
- Terence Gordon Mansfield. lately Managing Director, National Magazine Company. For services to the Magazine Industry. (Nr Ware, Hertfordshire)
- Patricia Margaret McCall. Headteacher, Campie Primary School, Musselburgh, East Lothian. For services to Education.
- Norman McFadyen. Procurator Fiscal, Scottish Court in the Netherlands, Scottish Executive.
- Doreen Mellon. Formerly Head, Area Regeneration Division, Scottish Executive. (Flayosc, France)
- Dorothy Cheryl Miller. Chief Executive, East Sussex County Council. For services to Local Government. (Tunbridge Wells, Kent)
- Kieran John Moriarty. Consultant Gastroenterologist, Royal Bolton Hospital. For services to Medicine. (Stockport, Greater Manchester)
- Hugh Morison. Chief Executive, Scotch Whisky Association. For services to the Whisky Industry. (Edinburgh)
- Stephen David Moss, M.B.E. Chairman, Springboard UK. For services to Education and Training. (London, W8)
- Brian Edward Mulroy. Lately Headteacher, St. Monica's Catholic Primary School, Sefton, Merseyside. For services to Education. (Widnes, Cheshire)
- Professor Noreen Elizabeth Lady Murray. Formerly Professor of Molecular Genetics, University of Edinburgh. For services to Science.
- Denis Francis O'Connor, QPM. Chief Constable, Surrey Police. For services to the Police. (Dorking, Surrey)
- Professor Anthony Ian Ogus. For services to the Social Security Advisory Committee. (Oldham, Lancashire)
- Professor David Ian Olive, FRS. For services to Theoretical Physics. (Caswell, Swansea)
- David Sidney Oxley, O.B.E. For services to Sport. (Harrogate, North Yorkshire)
- Derek Gordon Pain. Head, Civil Service Pensions, Cabinet Office. (Basingstoke, Hampshire)
- Anthony James Pearson. Deputy Chairman, Butler Trust. For services to the Resettlement of Offenders. (Croydon, Surrey)
- Lindsay Peer. Education Director, British Dyslexia Association. For services to Education. (Watford, Hertfordshire)
- William George Purdy. Chief Scout, Scout Association. For services to Young People. (Donaghadee, Down)
- John Edward Ratcliff. Chairman, Ratcliff Group Ltd. For services to the Road Transport Industry.
- Derek Robert Reid. Headteacher, Burnfoot New Community School, Hawick. For services to Education.
- John Neville Reyner. Director, East of England Investment Agency. For services to Business. (Royston, Hertfordshire)
- Professor David Reynolds. Professor of Leadership and School Effectiveness, University of Exeter. For services to the Numeracy Task Force. (Llantrisant, Rhondda Cynon Taff)
- Iain Samuel Robertson. Chairman, Corporate Banking and Financial Markets, Royal Bank of Scotland Group. For services to Banking. (St Albans, Hertfordshire)
- Professor Peter Roebuck. For services to Higher Education. (Portstewart, Londonderry)
- James Arthur Rowland. Chair, Engineering Construction Industry Training Board. For services to Training. (Southport, Merseyside)
- James Michael Rutter. Chief Executive, Veterinary Medicines Directorate, and Director of Veterinary Medicines, Department for Environment, Food and Rural Affairs. (Woking, Surrey)
- Robert Avisson Scott. Lately Chief Executive, CGNU. For services to the Insurance Industry. (Basingstoke, Hampshire)
- William Kerr Semple. Partnership Director, National Air Traffic Services Ltd. For services to Air Transport. (Kelty, Fife)
- Maj Gen Alan George Sharman. Director General, Defence Manufacturers' Association. For services to the Defence Industry. (Hindhead, Surrey)
- Robert Michael Coverdale Shields. Chief Executive, North West Regional Development Agency. For services to Regeneration. (Altrincham, Cheshire)
- David Sands Smith. Lately Head, Development Policy Department, Department for International Development. (Ringmer, Sussex)
- Christopher John Spry. Lately Chief Executive, Greater Glasgow Health Board. For services to the National Health Service. (Whitecraigs, Renfrewshire)
- Michael John Storey, O.B.E. Leader, Liverpool City Council. For services to Regeneration. (Liverpool, Merseyside)
- Stephen Thornton. Lately Chief Executive, NHS Confederation. For services to the National Health Service. (Cambridge, Cambridgeshire)
- Professor John Francis Uff, QC. Chairman, Southall Rail Accident Inquiry. For services to Rail Safety. (London)
- David Arthur John Vaughan, QC. For services to European Community Law. (London, W10)
- William Henry Walker. For public service. (London)
- Pauline Werhun. Director of Nursing and Clinical Development, Sandwell Health Care Trust. For services to the Recruitment and Retention of Staff. (West Bromwich, West Midlands)
- Christopher John West. Solicitor, H.M Land Registry, Lord Chancellor's Department. (London, SE3)
- Richard John Wheeler. Director, Information Management and Technology, Department of Trade and Industry. (Worthing, West Sussex)
- Cecil Stanley Whitehead, O.B.E. Secretary, Buckmore Park, Kent. For services to Young People. (Rochester, Kent)
- Edward Graham Whybrew. Lately Certification Officer. For services to Employment Relations. (Steeple Aston, Oxfordshire)
- Howard Williamson. Youth Worker and Researcher. For services to Young People. (Pontypridd, Mid Glamorgan)

==== Officers of the British Empire (O.B.E.) ====
- Helen Folasade Adu (Sade). Singer. For services to Popular Music. (London, W1F)
- Caryl Edward Agard. Director, Progress Trust. For services to Training. (Preston, Lancashire)
- Alan Aikin. Founder and chairman, Whirlow Hall Farm Trust, Sheffield, South Yorkshire. For services to Education. (Sheffield, South Yorkshire)
- Khizar Humayun Ansari. Director, Centre of Ethnic Minority Studies, Royal Holloway College, University of London. For services to Higher Education. (Windsor, Berkshire)
- Fiona Baikie. Principal, Telford College, Edinburgh. For services to Further Education. (Edinburgh)
- Professor Richard Baker. Director, Clinical Governance Research and Development Unit, University of Leicester. For services to Clinical Audit in Health Care. (Oakham, Leicestershire)
- Maureen Teresa Banbury. Member, HM Inspectorate, Office for Standards in Education. (Stockport, Cheshire)
- Ian Anderson Bannatyne. Governor in Charge, HM Prison Zeist, Netherlands, Scottish Prison Service. (Livingston, Lothian)
- Karna Dev (Chandhu) Bardhan. Consultant Physician and Gastroenterologist, Rotherham General Hospital, Rotherham, South Yorkshire. For services to Gastroenterology.
- Geoffrey Robert Bateman. For services to the Environment. (Exeter, Devon)
- Jeremy James Balfe Bennett. Formerly vice-president, Academy of Food and Wine Service. For services to the Wine Trade. (Sherborne, Dorset)
- Roger Charles Berry. For services to the community in Guernsey. (Guernsey, Channel Islands)
- Reba Bhaduri. For services to Social Work. (Manchester, Greater Manchester)
- Prasanta Ranjan Bhowmik. General Medical Practitioner, Newham, London. For services to Health Care. (London, E18)
- Wendy Patricia Bines. Head of Radiation Protection Policy, Health and Safety Executive, Department for Transport, Local Government and the Regions. (South Nutfield, Surrey)
- Jeffery Blumenfeld. For services to Marriage and Relationship Support. (London, NW4)
- Professor Margaret Ann Boden. Professor of Philosophy and Psychology, University of Sussex. For services to Cognitive Science. (Brighton, East Sussex)
- Susan Elaine Bonfanti. Head, Urban Policy 1 Division, Department for Transport, Local Government and the Regions. (Richmond, Surrey)
- Martin Maurice Brandon-Bravo. For services to Rowing. (Nottingham, Nottinghamshire)
- Martin James Brebner. Assistant director, Consumer Goods, Business and Postal Services Directorate, Department of Trade and Industry. (Letchworth, Hertfordshire)
- Wozzy Brewster. For services to Youth Arts. (London, SE13)
- Henry Brown, M.B.E. For services to the Commando Association. (Ruislip, Middlesex)
- Professor Sara Ann Brown. Deputy Principal, University of Stirling. For services to Educational Research. (Bridge of Allan, Stirling and Falkirk)
- Sheila Ann Brown. Chief executive, Birth Defects Foundation. For services to Child Health. (Cheslyn Hay, Staffordshire)
- Michael Buckby. For services to Foreign Language Studies. (York, North Yorkshire)
- Percival Stephen Cairns, M.B.E. For services to the Far East Prisoners of War Association. (Bridgwater, Somerset)
- Cecil, Lady Cameron. For services to Save the Children. (London, SW10)
- Janis Linda Cammell. Head of Policy, Administration and Finance Section, Invest UK, Department of Trade and Industry. (London, W6)
- Douglas Alexander Campbell. For services to Mobility for Disabled People. (Milton Keynes, Buckinghamshire)
- Hector Bryson Chawla. Formerly consultant Ophthalmic Surgeon, Princess Alexandra Eye Pavilion, Royal Infirmary of Edinburgh. For services to Medicine. (Edinburgh)
- Stephen Paul Clark. Head, Infrastructure Division, Cabinet Office. (Brentford, Middlesex)
- Roy Clarke. Writer. For services to Comedy Drama. (London, W11)
- Reginald Charles Colman. Chairman, Kent European Youth Association. For services to Young People. (Deal, Kent)
- Emmanuel Cooper. Potter. For services to Art. (London, NW1)
- George Nicholas Corah, DL. For services to the Heart of the National Forest Foundation. (Nr Oakham, Leicestershire)
- Alan Harcourt Craig. Executive director, Babtie Group. For services to Transportation. (Giffnock, Renfrewshire)
- James Strachan Cruickshank. Seed Potato Grower. For services to the Potato Industry. (Inverurie, Aberdeenshire)
- Elizabeth Dendy, M.B.E. For services to Sport for Disabled People. (London, W4)
- Barbara Elaine Dennis. For services to One Northeast and to Regional Development. (Newcastle upon Tyne, Tyne and Wear)
- Anthony Depledge. Development director, Arriva Passenger Services Limited. For services to Public Transport. (Lytham St Annes, Lancashire)
- Barbara Dickson. For services to Music and Drama. (Swinhope, Lincolnshire)
- Brian John Dinsdale. Chief executive, Hartlepool Borough Council. For services to Regeneration. (Middlesbrough, Cleveland)
- Ann Douglas. Formerly Headteacher, Balham Nursery School, Wandsworth, London. For services to Special Needs Education. (London, SW18)
- Christopher Dowling. Director of Public Services, Imperial War Museum. For services to Museums. (London, SW4)
- Heather Louise Drabble. Chief Nurse, Sheffield Teaching Hospitals NHS Trust, South Yorkshire. For services to Health Care. (High Peak, Derbyshire)
- Bridget Drew. Formerly director, ADAS Consulting Ltd. For services to the Dairy Industry. (Basingstoke, Hampshire)
- John Walter Dring. For services to Kids VIP. (Chinnor, Oxfordshire)
- Barbara Duffner. Chairman, Children's Hospice Association and of the Careers Review Committee. For services to Young People. (Biggar, Lanarkshire)
- David Richard Ellis. Director, HM Board of Inland Revenue. (Watford, Hertfordshire)
- Roger Ian Elphick. Head, Highway Management Services, Durham County Council. For services to Highways and Transportation. (High Shincliffe, Durham)
- David Hugh Evans. Director for Security, HM Board of Inland Revenue. (Telford, Shropshire)
- Mark Robert Fairbairn. Director of UK Strategy, National Grid. For services to the Electricity Industry. (Stratford-upon-Avon, Warwickshire)
- Herbert Faulkner. For services to Education and to the community. (Londonderry)
- Max Herbert Gustavas Faulkner. For services to Golf. (Pulborough, West Sussex)
- Professor Neil Ferguson. For services to Epidemiology and the Control of Infectious Diseases. (Witney, Oxfordshire)
- Paul Finch. For services to Architecture. (London, SW12)
- David John Fisher. For services to the Essex Local Flood Defence Committee. (Southminster, Essex)
- Michael Frederick Clive FitzGerald, QC. For services to the Planning Inspectorate and to Standards. (Nr Marlborough, Wiltshire)
- Baron Anthony Ronald Kendall Foster. South West Personnel Unit, Department for Environment, Food and Rural Affairs. (Westbury-on-Trym, Bristol)
- Leslie Cyril Frost. For services to the Normandy Veterans' Association. (Hindhead, Surrey)
- James Edward Fryer. Headteacher, Fox Hill Primary School, Sheffield, South Yorkshire. For services to Special Needs Education. (Sheffield, South Yorkshire)
- Keith Patrick Lee Fullagar. Technical director, Rolls-Royce plc. For services to the Defence Industry. (Doveridge, Derbyshire)
- Yvonne Jean Gallacher. Chief executive, Money Advice Scotland. For services to Disadvantaged Communities. (Clerkston, Renfrewshire)
- Abdul Rashid Gatrad. Head, Paediatrics Department, Manor Hospital, West Midlands. For services to Paediatrics and to Ethnic Minority communities. (Walsall, West Midlands)
- Owain Morris Gibby. Consultant Diabetologist, Royal Gwent Hospital, Newport. For services to Medicine. (Usk, Monmouthshire)
- Elizabeth Gillies. For services to Nursing in Scotland. (Edinburgh)
- Quintin Goldie. For services to Economic Development. (Banbridge, Down)
- Bryan Grenfell. For services to Epidemiology and the Control of Infectious Diseases. (Cambridge, Cambridgeshire)
- Clive Grimwood. Formerly Principal, Bacon's College, Southwark, London. For services to Education. (Lutterworth, Leicestershire)
- Manmohan Singh Gujral. Chief executive, Presentation Housing Association. For services to Housing. (Isleworth, Middlesex)
- Christine Hammill. Formerly Co-ordinator, Tyneside Cyrenians. For services to Homeless People. (Fenwick, Northumberland)
- Peter Hanley. Head, Local Strategic Partnerships, Government Office for the North East, Department for Transport, Local Government and the Regions. (Chester Le Street, Durham)
- David Harding. Formerly head of Sculpture and Environmental Art, Glasgow School of Art. For services to Higher Education. (Glasgow)
- Walter Edward Harley. For services to the Royal Air Forces Association. (Halesowen, West Midlands)
- Mary Ann Rose Harris. For services to the Girls Venture Corps Air Cadets. (London, SE2)
- Hilary Ruth Harrison. For public service. (Bangor, Down)
- Peter Heaf. For services to the Royal British Legion. (Wallingford, Oxfordshire)
- Isabel Bisset Henderson. For services to Art of the Pictish Period. (Tain, Ross and Cromarty)
- John Downie Herd. Chairman, Accord Hospice. For services to the community in Paisley, Renfrewshire. (Paisley, Renfrewshire)
- Patricia Holden. Senior Social Development Adviser, Department for International Development. (Switzerland)
- Sandra Robson Hood. Assistant chief Constable, Strathclyde Police. For services to the Police. (Alloway, Ayrshire and Arran)
- Denise Howard. For services to Tourism in Yorkshire. (York, North Yorkshire)
- Peter Gordon Hudson. Formerly Headteacher, Southgate School and Salisbury School, Enfield, London. For services to Education. (Orpington, Kent)
- Nasser Hussain. For services to Cricket. (Chelmsford, Essex)
- Susan Elizabeth Ion. Executive Director, Technology and Operations, BNFL. For services to the Nuclear Industry. (Leyland, Lancashire)
- Alexander John Rennie Izat. Chairman, Moredun Research Institute. For services to Agriculture. (Berwick-upon-Tweed, Berwickshire)
- David Jackson. For services to the Telecommunications Industry. (Offenham, Worcestershire)
- Leonard Christopher Jackson. Chairman, Nottingham Common Purpose. For services to the New Deal. (Nr Newark, Nottinghamshire)
- Professor Martin John Jarvis. Principal Scientist, Imperial Cancer Research Fund. For services to Smoking Research. (London, SE22)
- Jean Sandra Jenkinson. For services to the Birmingham Early Years Development and Childcare Partnership. (Birmingham, West Midlands)
- Geraint Morgan Jeremiah. Consultant Physician, Neath General Hospital, Swansea. For services to Medicine. (Swansea)
- Moussa Jogee, M.B.E, JP. Deputy Chair, Commission for Racial Equality Scotland. For services to Race Equality. (Dalgety Bay, Fife)
- Capt Philip Johanson. Chief secretary. For services to the Church Army. (London, SE3)
- Colin Johnson. Plant manager, Ford Motor Company. For services to Industry in South Wales. (Cathays, Cardiff)
- Francis James Johnston. For public service. (Belfast)
- Bernard William Richard Jones. For services to Business and to the community in South Wales. (Bridgend, Mid Glamorgan)
- Brian Anthony Jones. Formerly Headteacher, St John's Roman Catholic Comprehensive School, Bishop Auckland, County Durham. For services to Education and to the community. (Durham)
- Professor Julian David Clayton Jones. Professor of Engineering Optics and head of the Department of Physics, Heriot-Watt University, and director, Opto Sci Limited. For services to Science and Engineering. (West Linton, Tweeddale)
- Professor Heather Evelyn Joshi. Professor of Economic Demography, Institute of Education. For services to Women's Issues.
- Wasfi Kani. Founder, Pimlico Opera and Grange Park Opera. For services to Music. (London, NW5)
- Iain Manning Kennedy. Chair, Church and Co. For services to the Footwear Industry. (Northampton, Northamptonshire)
- Donald Edward Kent. Inspector, HM Fire Service Inspectorate. For services to the Fire Service. (Berkhamsted, Hertfordshire)
- Samuel Robert Keown. Chairman, Beta Technology Ltd. For services to Technology Transfer and to Regional Development. (Doncaster, South Yorkshire)
- Ann Julia Kettle. Senior Lecturer in Medieval History, University of St. Andrews. For services to Higher Education. (St Andrews, Fife)
- Nicolette King. Managing director, Isuzu Trucks UK Ltd. For services to the Road Transport Industry. (Rochester, Kent)
- David Robert Samuel Kingan, DL. For services to the St. John Ambulance Brigade. (London)
- Francesca Marilyn Simone Klug. Senior Research Fellow, Human Rights Centre, London School of Economics. For services to Civil Justice and Human Rights. (London, N8)
- Jennifer Anne Knight. Specialist Policy Officer, Equal Opportunities Unit, Department for Education and Skills.
- John Marriott Knight. Regional Architect, Historic Scotland. (Edinburgh)
- Janis Kong. For services to Transport and to Regional Development in South East England. (Walton-on-Thames, Surrey)
- Verity Ann Lambert. For services to Film and Television Production. (London, W11)
- Sarah Caroline Leigh. For services to the Legal Profession. (London, EC2Y)
- Barry Linton. Grade 7, Department for Environment, Food and Rural Affairs. (Reading, Berkshire)
- William Hagan Lockhart. For services to the Voluntary Sector. (Holywood, Down)
- Alastair Douglas Wollaston Logan. For services to Justice. (Guildford, Surrey)
- Frances Love. Director, Couple Counselling Scotland. For services to Marriage Guidance. (Edinburgh)
- Professor Roy Anthony Lowe. Professor of Education, University of Wales, Swansea. For services to Teacher Training in Wales. (Mumbles, Swansea)
- Janet Smith Lumsden. Headteacher, Kirkhill Primary School, Broxburn, West Lothian. For services to Education. (Whitburn, West Lothian)
- Brig John Alexander MacLean Macdonald, JP, DL. For services to the Soldiers', Sailors' and Airmen's Families Association in Nottinghamshire. (Newark-on-Trent, Nottinghamshire)
- Gillian Claire Mackenzie. For services to the Association of chief Officers of Probation. (Gloucester, Gloucestershire)
- Ian Duncan Robertson MacNicol, DL. For services to the Country Landowners' Association and to Agriculture in Norfolk. (Melton Constable, Norfolk)
- John Alan Mann. Clerk and Superintendent, London Central Markets. For services to Smithfield Market and to Veterinary Medicine. (Norwich, Norfolk)
- Miriam Margolyes. Actress. For services to Drama. (London, SW4)
- John Herd Martin. Grade 7, Department for Work and Pensions. (Paisley, Renfrewshire)
- Monica Mason. Assistant Director, Royal Ballet. For services to Dance. (London, WC2E)
- William Elson Matthews. For services to Aboriculture. (Penshurst, Kent)
- William Samuel McChesney. For services to Industry. (Carrickfergus, Antrim)
- Neil McClelland. Director, National Literacy Trust. For services to Education. (Dorking, Surrey)
- Elizabeth McClurg. For services to Education and to the community. (Craigavon, Armagh)
- John St Clair McCormick. For services to Health Care in Dumfries and Galloway.
- Patrick McHugh. For services to the St. Vincent de Paul Society. (Ballymena, Antrim)
- Terence Peter McLoughlin. Director of Government Affairs, BAE Systems plc. For services to the Aerospace Industry. (Amersham, Buckinghamshire)
- Deborah Mellor. Deputy head, NHS Employment Branch, Department of Health. (Otley, West Yorkshire)
- Alan Richard Mellors. Area manager, Highways Agency, Department for Transport, Local Government and the Regions. (Ruislip, Middlesex)
- Colin Millar. Member, Aberdeenshire Council. For services to Local Government. (Aberdeenshire)
- Professor Gordon Stewart Milne. Chairman, Scottish Valuation and Rating Council. For services to Local Government. (Edinburgh)
- Rodney Milnes. Chief Opera Critic, The Times. For services to Journalism and to Music. (London, N6)
- Philip Nigel Monk. Consultant, Communicable Disease Control. For services to Public Health. (Leicester, Leicestershire)
- James William Mullen. Formerly Governor, HM Prison Long Lartin, Prison Service. (Ossett, West Yorkshire)
- Debra Marie Murdock. Nurse manager, Rampton Hospital, Nottinghamshire. For services to Health Care and to the Royal College of Nursing. (Nottingham, Nottinghamshire)
- Vanda Murray. Chief executive Officer, Blick plc. For services to Industry and to Export. (Cirencester, Gloucestershire)
- David Anthony Murtagh. Grade B1, Ministry of Defence. (Saffron Walden, Essex)
- Dorothy Naylor. Chief executive, North West Tourist Board. For services to Tourism. (Chorley, Lancashire)
- Edgar Newcomb. Registrar and secretary, University of Manchester. For services to Higher Education. (Wilmslow, Cheshire)
- Gillian Esme Newton. Formerly Headteacher, Great Ponton Church of England Primary School, Lincolnshire. For services to Education. (Grantham, Lincolnshire)
- Leonard John Nike. For services to Business and to the community in Bracknell, Berkshire. (Binfield, Berkshire)
- Winifred Anne O'Kane. For services to Education. (Magherafelt, Londonderry)
- Arthur Joseph O'Neill. For services to Juvenile Justice. (Belfast)
- Robert William Ormond. For services to the Administration of Justice and to the community in Hampshire. (Alton, Hampshire)
- John Vincent Palmer. Chairman, Steel Industry National Training Organisation. For services to Education and Training. (Stafford, Staffordshire)
- Andrew John Parker. Chairman, British Egg Industry Council. For services to the Egg Industry. (Herstmonceux, East Sussex)
- David Parker. Assistant director, HM Board of Inland Revenue. (Nailsea, Bristol)
- Michael Joseph Parker. For services to the Energy Advisory Panel. (Haywards Heath, West Sussex)
- William Mervyn Pauley. For services to Journalism. (Belfast)
- Susan Peacock. Consultant, Engineering and Marine Training Authority. For services to Training. (Rickmansworth, Hertfordshire)
- Rosamunde Pilcher. Writer. For services to Literature. (Dundee)
- Gillian Margaret Poole. Matron, Nuffield Hospital Wolverhampton. For services to the Coronary Aftercare Group. (Wolverhampton, West Midlands)
- Keith Anthony Portlock, QPM. Formerly Deputy chief Constable, Devon and Cornwall Constabulary. For services to the Police. (Exeter, Devon)
- Michael Power. Deputy director, Catholic Education Service. For services to Education. (London, SE2)
- Denis Clifford Quilley. Actor. For services to Drama. (London, SW14)
- Professor Kenneth Cunningham Rankin. Orthopaedic Surgeon. For services to Orthopaedics in Africa. (Dundee)
- Christopher John Rea. Managing director, AES Engineering Ltd. For services to Industry. (Rotherham, South Yorkshire)
- Rupert John Rhymes. Chief executive, Society of London Theatre and the Theatrical Management Association. For services to Drama. (Bath, Somerset)
- Anne-Marie Desiree Richardson. For services to the British Red Cross Society in Guernsey. (Guernsey, Channel Islands)
- Nicholas John Martin Richardson. Grade B1, Ministry of Defence. (Croydon, Surrey)
- Huw Roberts. Headteacher, Ysgol Gyfun Llangefni. For services to Education. (Ynys Mon, Gwynedd)
- Archie Robertson. Director of Operations, Environment Agency. For services during Emergencies. (Harpenden, Hertfordshire)
- Belinda Robertson. Designer. For services to Textiles. (Edinburgh)
- Jennifer Mary Rodgers. Formerly director of Quality and Nursing, Frimley Park Hospital NHS Trust. For services to Health Care. (Church Crookham, Hampshire)
- Keith Rowlands. Headteacher, The Dell Primary School, Chepstow. For services to Education. (Chepstow, Gwent)
- Amrik Singh Sahota. For services to the Economy and to the Asian community in the West Midlands. (Birmingham, West Midlands)
- Huw Salisbury. Headteacher, South Camden Community School, London. For services to Education. (London, W2)
- Jeremy San, Founder, Argonaut Games plc. For services to the Computer Games Industry. (London, NW1)
- Roger Henry Sanbrook. Leader, Restrictions and Sanctions Team, H.M Board of Customs and Excise. (London)
- Barbara Saunders. For services to Consumer Representation in Financial Services. (St Albans, Hertfordshire)
- Professor Eric Daniel Saunders. For services to Sports Development. (Greenisland, Antrim)
- Philippa Mary Saunders. For services to OXFAM and to Save the Children. (London, SE3)
- Maurice Sharples. For services to the Citizens Advice Bureau Service. (Stockport, Cheshire)
- Michael Shearman. County director, Hampshire and Isle of Wight Youth Options. For services to Young People. (Alresford, Hampshire)
- George Geddes Shirriffs. General Medical Practitioner, Aberdeen. For services to the Scottish Council for Postgraduate Medical and Dental Education. (Aberdeen)
- Peter Ronald Shuker, TD. Formerly Principal and chief executive, Darlington College of Technology. For services to Further Education. (Darlington, Durham)
- Kathy-Ann Sienko. Nurse consultant for Rehabilitation. For services to Health Care and to Ethnic Minority Communities. (Bedfont, Middlesex)
- William Moore Sillery, DL. For services to Education. (Belfast)
- Penny Simpson. For services to the Children's Hearing System in Aberdeen. (Aberdeen)
- Kawal Jeet Kaur Singh. Headteacher, Gladstone Park Primary School, Brent, London. For services to Education. (North Wembley, Middlesex)
- June Elizabeth Smail. Head of Nursing, Gwent Health Authority. For services to Health Care. (Radyr, Cardiff)
- Capt David Terence Smith. RN. For services to HMS Trincomalee. (Southsea, Hampshire)
- Anne Spackman. For services to the National Council of One Parent Families. (London, N10)
- Michael Spong. Principal Crown Prosecutor, Crown Prosecution Service. (Guildford, Surrey)
- Vaughan Starkey. Grade B1, Ministry of Defence. (West Byfleet, Surrey)
- Ralph Adolphus Straker, JP. For services to Community Relations. (London, N3)
- Julian Streeter. Policy Adviser, HM Board of Inland Revenue. (East Twickenham, Middlesex)
- John Alexander Stringer. For services to the Chamber of Commerce Movement. (Newtownards, Down)
- Roy Summers. board member, East of Scotland Water. For services to the Water Industry. (Helensburgh, Dunbartonshire)
- Barbara Swann. Health Visitor. For services to Health Care. (Stockport, Greater Manchester)
- Andrew Henry Tabor. Team Leader, Transition Division, Department for Education and Skills. (Sheffield, South Yorkshire)
- Graham Taylor. Formerly Manager, Watford Football Club. For services to Association Football. (Rickmansworth, Hertfordshire)
- Karen Ann Taylor. Audit manager, National Audit Office. (Sevenoaks, Kent)
- Malcolm Howard Taylor. For services to the Vaughan Williams Memorial Library. (London, SE13)
- Richard William Taylor. Group Commercial director, Vosper Thorneycroft plc. For services to the Defence Industry. (Southampton, Hampshire)
- Jennifer Anne Thomas. For services to The Child Bereavement Trust. (Cookham, Berkshire)
- Donald Angus Thompson. Deputy Surveyor of the Crown Lands of the New Forest, Forestry Commission. (Lyndhurst, Hampshire)
- Merrick Hugh Denton-Thompson. For services to the Learning Through Landscapes Trust. (Bishop's Waltham, Hampshire)
- Daphne Jane Todd. Portrait Painter. For services to Art. (Mayfield, East Sussex)
- Arthur Torrington. For services to Community Relations in London. (Orpington, Kent)
- Brian George Scott Tucker. Regional Marketing director, BAE Systems. For services to the Defence and Aerospace Industries. (West Malling, Kent)
- The Hon Edward Neil Turner, DL. For services to Business in Yorkshire and Humberside. (Sheffield, South Yorkshire)
- Professor Norman Tutt. For services to Child Care Services in Ealing, London. (Bath, Somerset)
- Norman Derrick Udall. Principal Official Veterinary Surgeon, Food Standards Agency. (Crewkerne, Somerset)
- Peter Frederick Vallance. Grade 6, Home Office. (Haywards Heath, West Sussex)
- Mary Catherine Waddell. For services to Health Care. (Bangor, Down)
- Alison Wainman. Formerly Member, Kent County Council. For services to Local Government.
- Professor Frank Arneil Walker. For services to Architectural History and Conservation. (Kilmacolm, Renfrewshire)
- Ann Margaret Waters. Grade 5, Department for Environment, Food and Rural Affairs. (London, N10)
- Kevin Charles Watkins. Senior Policy Adviser, OXFAM. For services to Debt Relief. (Oxford, Oxfordshire)
- Ralph Michael George Watson. Editor, BDA News. For services to the British Dental Association and to the Dental Profession. (Manningtree, Essex)
- David Ernest Spencer Webster. For services to the Church of England. (Tunbridge Wells, Kent)
- Denis Simpson White. For services to Medicine. (Dunmurry, Belfast)
- Paul Milner Whiteman. Member, Bridgnorth District Council and to the Local Government Association. For services to Local Government. (Broseley, Shropshire)
- Anthony Michael Whittaker. Grade B2, Ministry of Defence. (Bromley, Kent)
- David Thomas Wilkinson, JP. For services to the Magistrates' Court Service. (Rochdale, Lancashire)
- Christopher Patrick Wilson. Formerly Press secretary to the Secretary of State for Wales. The Wales Office. (London, SW12)
- Brian Bernard Winston. For charitable services. (Hadley Wood, Hertfordshire)
- Geoffrey Mark Wolfson. For services to the Brathay Trust, Ambleside, Cumbria. (London, SW1P)
- John Graham Wood. For services to the Food and Drink Federation and to Food Safety. (Carshalton, Surrey)
- Richard John Wood. For services to People with Disabilities. (Ripley, Derbyshire)
- Lawrence Woodward. Director, Elm Farm Research Centre. For services to Organic Farming. (Marlborough, Wiltshire)
- Professor Mark Edward John Woolhouse, Chair of Veterinary Public Health and Quantitative Epidemiology, University of Edinburgh. For services to the Control of Infectious Diseases (Edinburgh)
- Francis Edward Worsley. Formerly Complaints commissioner, Financial Services Authority. For services to Financial Regulation. (Sonning on Thames, Berkshire)
- Elizabeth Yates. Group manager, Court Service, Lord Chancellor's Department. (Darlington, Durham)
- Ian Alexander Young, DL. For services to Economic Regeneration. (Londonderry)
- Jayne Diane Zito. For services to The Zito Trust. (London, SE10)

==== Members of the British Empire (M.B.E.) ====
- Richard Lionel Abbott. Workshop Engineer. For services to the Defence Industry. (London)
- Verna Elizabeth Adderley. Executive Officer, Benefits Agency, Department for Work and Pensions. (Manchester, Greater Manchester)
- Shama Mahmood Ahmad. For services to the community in Newham, London. (London, E6)
- Moira Alexander. For services to Education. (Dromore, Down)
- Beverley Anne Allardice. For services to the community in Fleet, Hampshire. (Fleet, Hampshire)
- John Peter Allen. Farmer. For services to Hill Farming. (Penrith, Cumbria)
- David Roy Allsopp. For services to the West Midlands Federation of Victim Support Schemes. (Walsall, West Midlands)
- Jack Andrews. For services to the Channel 4 Theatre director Scheme and to the Pearson Playwrights' Scheme. (Teddington, Middlesex)
- Chaudhury Mohammed Anwar. For services to Community Relations in Middlesex. (Enfield, Middlesex)
- Sital Raja-Arjan. Marketing manager, House of Rajas. For services to Tourism in Bolton, Greater Manchester. (Bolton, Greater Manchester)
- Pauline Frances Arksey. Formerly non-executive director, South Birmingham Mental Health Trust. For services to the National Schizophrenia Fellowship. (Worcester, Worcestershire)
- Doris Rebecca Arliss. For services to the community, especially Elderly People, in Porchester, Hampshire. (Porchester, Hampshire)
- Edmund Martin Arnold. Chairman, Hunslet Club for Boys and Girls, Leeds, West Yorkshire. For services to Young People. (Otley, North Yorkshire)
- Martin John Ashburn. Commandant, Suffolk Special Constabulary. For services to the Police. (Woodbrige, Suffolk)
- James Aston. Partner, HLB Kidsons. For services to Education. (Stratford upon Avon, Warwickshire)
- John David Atkin. Chief Steward, University College Durham. For services to Higher Education. (Durham)
- Christopher Leslie Atkinson. Member, Alfreton Town Council, Derbyshire. For services to the community. (Alfreton, Derbyshire)
- Angela Austin. Headteacher, Perthcelyn Community School. For services to Education. (Hengoed, Rhondda Cynon Taff)
- William Frederick Austin. For services to the community in Stoke-on-Trent, Staffordshire. (Stoke-on-Trent, Staffordshire)
- Nancy Doris Baber. Leader, Manchester Prestwich Crusaders. For services to Young People. (Manchester, Greater Manchester)
- Ian Baines. Vice-Consul (Investment), British Consulate, New York. (USA)
- Martin Trevor Baines. Grade C2, Ministry of Defence. (East Kilbride, Glasgow)
- John Bamford. For services to the Royal British Legion in Staffordshire. (Stoke-on-Trent, Staffordshire)
- Anthony Patrick Bannister. Chief Admiralty Pilot for Portsmouth, Ministry of Defence. (Havant, Hampshire)
- John Bannister. Formerly assistant to the Government chief Whip and to the Leader of the House of Lords. (London, SE12)
- Mary Rose Barker, DL. For services to the community in Kingston upon Hull, East Riding of Yorkshire. (West Ella, East Riding of Yorkshire)
- Edith Mary Barlee. For services to Riding for the Disabled in Edinburgh. (Peeblesshire, Tweeddale)
- Amanda Jane Sizer Barrett. Director general, Gardenex. For services to Export. (Wadhurst, East Sussex)
- Hugh Barron. For services to Gaelic Studies. (Inverness, Inverness-shire)
- Peggy Barson. For services to the Apollo Theatre, Oxford. (Abingdon, Oxfordshire)
- Pamela Jean Bartlett. For services to Sick and Disabled People in Guernsey. (Guernsey, Channel Islands)
- Morag Elizabeth Barton. Director. For services to the Brooklands Museum Trust. (Weybridge, Surrey)
- Peter Bayley. Projectionist, Phoenix Cinema, East Finchley. For services to the Film Industry. (London, N3)
- Thomas John Beare. For services to Lifelong Learning. (Newtownabbey, Antrim)
- Maureen Helen Beaumont. Manager, Lost Property Office. For services to Transport for London. (Corringham, Essex)
- Richard Graham Beavis. Constable, Metropolitan Police Service. For services to the community in Thamesmead Town, London. (London, SE18)
- Trevor Beer. Wildlife and Countryside Columnist, Western Morning News. For services to Journalism and to the Environment. (Barnstaple, Devon)
- Wendy Barbara Bell. Business manager, Employment Service, Department for Work and Pensions. (Barnsley, South Yorkshire)
- Esrald George Emmanuel Bennett. For services to Elderly People in Rotherham, South Yorkshire. (Sheffield, South Yorkshire)
- Robin Henry Bennett. Director, Lime Centre. For services to Building Conservation. (Winchester, Hampshire)
- Mavis Merlina Stephenson-Best. Youth Affairs Officer, West Indian Standing Conference. For services to Equal Opportunities. (London, SE7)
- Sterling Betancourt. For services to the Steel Band Movement. (London, NW10)
- Betty Alberta Betts. For services to the Kent Association for the Blind. (Maidstone, Kent)
- Nora Billington. For services to Dance in Oldham, Lancashire. (Oldham, Lancashire)
- Keith Birtles. For charitable services to Romanian Orphans. (Doncaster, South Yorkshire)
- Margaret Law Birtwistle. For services to the community and to the Drug Problem Helpline in Epsom, Surrey.
- Alec Gordon Blackburn. Vice-president, Swansea and West Wales Occupation Safety Group. For services to Health and Safety. (Killay, Swansea)
- Stephanie Diane Blackman. Higher Executive Officer, Department for Work and Pensions. (Ormskirk, Lancashire)
- Isabel Anne Blincow. For services to the Great Sheffield Art Show. (Sheffield, South Yorkshire)
- Doreen Bouwens. For services to the community in Shepperton, Middlesex. (Shepperton, Middlesex)
- Pamela Bowen. Deputy chief executive, Science, Engineering, Technology and Mathematics Network. For services to Education and to Industry. (Epsom, Surrey)
- Raymond Bowker. For services to the community in Altrincham, Cheshire. (Altrincham, Cheshire)
- Thomas Francis Bowles. For services to the Fishing Industry. (Brixham, Devon)
- Dorothy Bowmaker. Adviser manager, Employment Service, Department for Work and Pensions. (Saltburn, Cleveland)
- Phyllida Margaret Mary Bowser. Director, Wishart Centre, Dundee. For services to Homeless People. (Newport-on-Tay, Fife)
- Richard Alan Brading. Head of Humanities and Examinations Co-ordinator, St Bede's Inter-Church School, Cambridge. For services to Education. (Cambridge, Cambridgeshire)
- Ann Brady. Chief executive, Highland Pre-School Services. For services to Early Years Education. (Evanton, Ross and Cromarty)
- Kenneth Ernest Brian Bragger. Formerly Deputy Departmental Security Officer, Department for Environment, Food and Rural Affairs. (Sudbury, Suffolk)
- Robert Anthony Breach. Head, Quality and Environmental Services, Severn Trent Water. For services to the Water Industry. (Solihull, West Midlands)
- Margaret Joan Bridges. Personal secretary, HM Board of Inland Revenue. (Bath, Somerset)
- David Edward Britton. General Medical Practitioner, Newark, Nottinghamshire. For services to Health Care. (Newark, Nottinghamshire)
- Norma Broadbridge. For services to the British Biology Olympiad. (Birmingham, West Midlands)
- John Brooks. For services to the community, especially the NSPCC, in Maidstone, Kent. (Maidstone, Kent)
- Jennifer Margaret Elizabeth Buckle. For services to the community in Devon. (Ashburton, Devon)
- Christine Anne Bullen. Deputy Establishment Officer, Privy Council Office. (Cambridgeshire)
- David Patrick Henry Burgess. For services to the community, especially the Caius College Mission, in Battersea, London. (London, W1K)
- Gladys Burrell. For services to the community, especially the Barnstaple Town Majorettes, in Devon. (Barnstaple, Devon)
- Margaret Burrow. For services to the Barrow and District Disability Association, Cumbria. (Barrow-in-Furness, Cumbria)
- Harold Burrows. For services to Emergency Planning Services in the Welsh Ambulance Service. (Denbigh, Denbighshire)
- Joan Millicent Burton. For services to the community in Pattingham, Staffordshire. (Wolverhampton, Staffordshire)
- Paul Hubert Bush. For services to Disabled People's Access. (Nr Daventry, Northamptonshire)
- Colin Butler. For services to First World War Veterans through Genesta. (Brackley, Northamptonshire)
- Shaukat Butt, JP. Member, Glasgow City Council. For services to Local Government and to the community. (Glasgow)
- Alan Robert Montgomery Cahill. For services to the Ambulance Service. (Drumahoe, Londonderry)
- John Stewart Caldwell, JP. For services to the community in Aberlour and Upper Speyside, Banffshire. (Aberlour, Banffshire)
- Robena Cameron. Personal secretary, Court Service, Lord Chancellor's Department. (Ballyclare, Antrim)
- Andrew Campbell. For services to the community in Kirkcudbright. (Kirkcudbright, Dumfries)
- Andrew John Candler. Adviser, Disability Information and Advice Project. For services to disabled people. (London, N19)
- Frederick George Carpenter. For services to disabled people in South West England. (Warminster, Wiltshire)
- Margaret Ann Carrick. Senior Home Care assistant, North Yorkshire County Council. For services to Home Care. (Filey, North Yorkshire)
- John Francis Carson. For services to Training. (Downpatrick, Down)
- Mary Lontine Carter. For services to the Isle of Man Police Court Mission.
- Steven Carter. Manager, Rothwell Training Centre, Leeds. For services to Adults with Learning Disabilities. (Leeds, West Yorkshire)
- John Catterall. For services to the community, especially Choral Music, in Lancashire. (Preston, Lancashire)
- Edward Henry Chandler. For services to the community in Bognor Regis, West Sussex. (Bognor Regis, West Sussex)
- Loretta Joanne Chaplin. Grade E1, Ministry of Defence. (Norwich, Norfolk)
- David Laurence Chapman. For public service. (Lisburn, Antrim)
- Henry Fraser Chapman. For services to the community in New Deer, Aberdeenshire. (Peterhead, Aberdeenshire)
- Buddig Mona Nans Charles. For services to Health Care and to the community in South Wales. (Roath Park, Cardiff)
- Winifred Lucy May Cheyney. For services to the community in Milford-on-Sea, Hampshire. (Lymington, Hampshire)
- Martin David William Childs. Production Designer. For services to the Film Industry. (London, SE1)
- William John Chivers. For services to the Sea Cadet Corps in Edgware, Middlesex. (Kenton, Middlesex)
- Colin Chritchard. For services to the community, especially the Taunton Carnival, in Somerset. (Taunton, Somerset)
- Diane Gillian Churchill. For services to Holidays for Disabled Children in Ashdown Forest. (Hove, East Sussex)
- Ronald James Clare. Member, Institute of Advanced Motorists. For services to Road Safety. (Liverpool, Merseyside)
- Hugh Turton Clark. Sheep Farmer. For services to the Sheep Industry in Suffolk. (Newmarket, Suffolk)
- David John Clarson. For services to the Manor and Castle Development Trust, Sheffield, South Yorkshire. (Grindleford, Derbyshire)
- Steven John Clements. General Dental Practitioner. For services to Practice Design in the NHS. (Sutton Coldfield, West Midlands)
- Rees Temple Coghlan. For services to the Aylsham Care Trust in Norfolk. (Aylsham, Norfolk)
- Doreen Cohen. For services to Community Relations in Ilford, Essex. (Ilford, Essex)
- Roy Cole. Bus Driver Trainer, Arriva Midlands North. For services to Cystic Fibrosis. (Market Drayton, Shropshire)
- Josephine Mary Collins. Director of Music, Chicken Shed Theatre Co. For services to Music. (London, N13)
- Margaret Elizabeth Connolly. For services to Higher Education. (Portstewart, Londonderry)
- John Cooke. Managing director, Northumberland Guidance Company. For services to Careers Guidance. (Alnwick, Northumberland)
- David John Coome. For services to the Airfreight Industry. (Finaghy, Belfast)
- Maureen Cooper. For services to the community, especially Rochdale Childer, in Lancashire. (Rochdale, Lancashire)
- John William Coopey. For services to the Coroner's Officers' Association. (Nr Cheltenham, Gloucestershire)
- Irene Cope. Residential Scheme manager, Holmwood Sheltered Housing. For services to Elderly People in Bristol. (Hanham, Bristol)
- Joyce Gladys Copp. For services to the WRVS in Exeter, Devon. (Exeter, Devon)
- Clifford Dennis Corner. For services to Local History in Somerset. (Porlock, Somerset)
- John Arthur Corner. For services to the community, especially St Luke's Hospice, in Brent and Harrow, Middlesex. (Chorleywood, Hertfordshire)
- Sefton Roland Coslett. For services to the community, especially Disabled People and Local Government, in Llanelli, South Wales. (Llanelli, Carmarthenshire)
- Heather Cowl. Head of Music, Dorothy Stringer High School, Brighton and Hove, East Sussex. For services to Education. (Hove, East Sussex)
- Eoin Cox. For services to the Borders Forest Trust.
- Kenneth Cracknell. For services to the community in Beccles, Suffolk. (Beccles, Suffolk)
- Dennis John Crane. For services to People with Kidney Disease. (Stockport, Greater Manchester)
- Sylvia Creighton. For services to the community. (Lisburn, Antrim)
- Doris Crimes. For services to the WRVS in Partington, Manchester. (Manchester, Greater Manchester)
- Joy Astor Cripps. For services to the community, especially Age Concern, in Reigate, Surrey. (Redhill, Surrey)
- Charles Hugh Crockford. Formerly Mechanic, Tenby Lifeboat, Pembrokeshire. For services to Marine Safety. (Tenby, Pembrokeshire)
- Michael David Cross. Formerly Senior Professional and Technology Officer, National Assembly for Wales. (Cardiff, South Glamorgan)
- Ann Jacqueline Cummings. For services to Headway Hurstwood Park in Sussex. (Seaford, East Sussex)
- Philip Martin Cunningham. Accordionist and Composer. For services to Scottish Traditional Music. (Beauly, Inverness-shire)
- Joan Currie. Managing director, Menzies Engineering Design Ltd. For services to Enterprise in the Highlands and Islands. (Dornoch, Sutherland)
- David Allan James Dando. For services to the Petroleum Industry Association. (Southampton, Hampshire)
- Frederick John Lyne Davey. For services to the community, especially the Air Training Corps, in Plymouth. (Plymouth, Devon)
- Jeannie Davidson. Childminding Development Officer, Daycare Trust. For services to Childminding. (London, N8)
- George Ivor Davies. For services to the community in Torfaen, South Wales. (Pontypool, Torfaen)
- Hugh Emlyn Davies. Formerly Veterinary Surgeon. For services to the Veterinary Profession in Staffordshire. (Nr Rugeley, Staffordshire)
- John Thomas Cadwell Davies. For services to the community in New Quay, Ceredigion. (New Quay, Ceredigion)
- Professor Morgan Wynn Humphrey-Davies. For services to the University of Wales, Bangor. (Anglesey, Gwynedd)
- Stedman Davies. For services to Judo and the Martial Arts in Llanelli, South Wales. (Llanelli, Carmarthenshire)
- Thomas Dawkins. Union Learning Representative, Ceramics and Allied Trade Union. For services to Lifelong Learning. (Newcastle-under-Lyme, Staffordshire)
- Alan Daysh. Fitter/Turner, Fleet Support Ltd. For services to the Defence Industry. (Gosport, Hampshire)
- Lewis Edwin Deal. For services to the Medway Aircraft Preservation Society, Kent. (Medway, Kent)
- Joyce Amelia May Denholm. For services to the Far East Prisoners of War Funds and Associations. (Blandford Forum, Dorset)
- Cyril Dennis. For services to the Jewish community in Essex. (London, NW3)
- Raymond George Coulter Desmond. Horticultural Historian. For services to Garden History. (East Twickenham, Middlesex)
- Lynda Devereux. For services to the National Group on Homeworking.
- John Dew, DL. For services to the community, especially the Horsham Cricket Club, in West Sussex. (West Sussex)
- Hazel Dickson. For services to the community in Penarth, Vale of Glamorgan. (Penarth, The Vale of Glamorgan)
- Elizabeth Mabel Difford. For services to the British Red Cross Society in Somerset. (Bridgwater, Somerset)
- Pauline Ann Dodds. For services to the British Red Cross Society. (Cambridge, Cambridgeshire)
- David Lee Donachie. For services to Elderly and Disabled People in Greater Manchester. (Astley, Greater Manchester)
- William Leslie Donaldson. For services to Education and to Schools Football. (Linlithgow, Lothian)
- Peter Francis Doran. For services to the community, especially the Bebington Sea Cadet Unit, in Wirral. (Wirral, Merseyside)
- Maureen Douglas. General Medical Practitioner, West Scotland. For services to Health Care.
- Ann McKenzie Downie. Sub-Postmistress. For services to the Post Office and to the community in Fairlie, Ayrshire. (Fairlie, Ayrshire and Arran)
- Valerie May Dring. Senior manager, NatWest Bank plc. For services to Business. (Sandy, Bedfordshire)
- Alexander Macrae Duffy. For services to the St John Ambulance Brigade in Nottinghamshire. (Nottingham, Nottinghamshire)
- Dorothy Duffy. Specialist Health Visitor. For services to Children with Special Needs in Hounslow, Middlesex. (Twickenham, Middlesex)
- Michael Henry Dufty. Senior Maintenance Technician, London School of Economics and Political Science. For services to Higher Education. (London, SE5)
- Edna Duke. For services to the community in Merton, London. (London, SW19)
- Ida Evelyn Durack. Formerly Charge Nurse, Tyrwhitt House. For nursing services to Ex-Service Personnel. (Leatherhead, Surrey)
- Paul Fort Dymond. For services to BP and to the Oil and Gas Industry. (Bieldside, Aberdeen)
- George Alan Malcolm Dyson. Band 4, Health and Safety Executive, Department for Transport, Local Government and the Regions. (Reading, Berkshire)
- Marjorie Dyson. For services to the Magistrates' Court in Manchester. (Bury, Lancashire)
- Donna Francesca Eaton. Assistant in Charge, News Traffic Unit. For services to the BBC. (Feltham, Middlesex)
- Neil Tristan Edwards. Principal Technician, HM Board of Customs and Excise. (London)
- William James Ellard. Formerly Client/Maintenance Officer, Daventry District Council. For services to the community in Northampton. (Weedon, Northamptonshire)
- Susan Elphick. For charitable services to the Countess of Chester Hospital NHS Trust, Chester. (Chester, Cheshire)
- Anthony Elsby. For services to the community, especially Young People, in Chesterton, Staffordshire. (Newcastle-under-Lyme, Staffordshire)
- Emmaline Violet Elizabeth Emery. For services to Education. (Downpatrick, Down)
- Jill Ann England. For services to Housing. (Portadown, Armagh)
- Tegwyn Mills Evans. For services to the community in Welshpool, Powys. (Welshpool, Powys)
- Sylvia Mary Everitt. For services to the Staffordshire Millennium Embroideries. (Rawnsley Cannock, Staffordshire)
- Jill Eleanor Farwell. Executive director, Children's Hospice South West. For services to Palliative Care. (Barnstaple, Devon)
- Rita Alma Faulkner. For services to the community in Swinton, Greater Manchester. (Salford, Greater Manchester)
- Christine Lois Feather. Co-ordinator, Project Action on Clinical Effectiveness. For services to Health Care. (Bradford, West Yorkshire)
- Barbara Primrose Feltham. For services to the community in East Quantoxhead, Somerset. (Bridgwater, Somerset)
- Iris Medora Le Feuvre. For services to the community in Jersey. (Jersey, Channel Islands)
- Mavis Fewkes. Support manager, Department for Education and Skills. (Rotherham, South Yorkshire)
- Roger Allan Fewster. Conductor, Cor Glandulais. For services to Music in Wales. (Llanelli, Carmarthenshire)
- Peter Leslie James Finnimore. Staff Officer, HM Inspectorate of Constabulary. For services to the Police. (Ruislip, Middlesex)
- Dorothy Rose Fissenden. School Cleaner, Borough Green Primary School, Sevenoaks, Kent. For services to Education. (Sevenoaks, Kent)
- Nelpah Eccleston Flanigan. For services to Community Relations in Surrey. (Camberley, Surrey)
- James Mathieson Fleming. Referee. For services to Rugby Union Football. (Edinburgh)
- James Vincent David Forte. Director of Social Responsibility, KPMG. For services to Community Volunteering. (Iver, Buckinghamshire)
- Ronald Mitford Foulkes. For services to the Countess Mountbatten Hospice, Southampton, Hampshire. (Winchester, Hampshire)
- Peter Granville Fowler. For services to the Newspaper Industry and to Charity. (Boyton, Wiltshire)
- Doreen France. For services to the community, especially the Performing Arts, in Huddersfield, West Yorkshire. (Huddesfield, West Yorkshire)
- Francis John French. For services to the Barton-on-Humber Civic Society, Lincolnshire. (Barton-on-Humber, Lincolnshire)
- Frederick Arthur French. For services to Angling, Conservation and Disabled People. (Ambleside, Cumbria)
- Allen Fyffe. For services to Mountaineering. (Aviemore, Inverness-shire)
- Betty Evelyn Gallimore, JP. For services to the community in Sale, Greater Manchester. (Sale, Cheshire)
- Gladys Clara Galloway. Milk Lady. For services to the community in Hatfield Broad Oak, near Bishops Stortford, Hertfordshire. (Bishops Stortford, Hertfordshire)
- Margaret Mosquera-Garcia. Administrative Officer, Vehicle Inspectorate, Department for Transport, Local Government and the Regions. (Heywood, Lancashire)
- Renato Garcia. Mental Health Services manager. For services to Mentally Ill People in Ealing, London. (Maidenhead, Berkshire)
- William Gardner. For services to the Scottish Seabird Centre, North Berwick. (North Berwick, East Lothian)
- Christine Garner. For services to the Citizens Advice Bureau Service and to the Community Legal Service in Leigh, Cheshire. (Warrington, Cheshire)
- Pauline Garthwaite. Headteacher, Oakvale School, Guernsey. For services to Special Needs Education. (Guernsey, Channel Islands)
- Edward Frederick John Gates. For services to disabled people in Surrey. (Cheam, Surrey)
- Mary Hattle Gemmell. For services to the Women's Guild and to the WRVS in Lanarkshire. (Wishaw, Lanarkshire)
- Ivy Gwendoline Mary George. For services to the WRVS in Maldon, Essex. (Maldon, Essex)
- Professor Christopher Russell German. For services to Marine Research. (Fordingbridge, Hampshire)
- Ian Robert Gibbons. Consul (Investment), British Consulate, New York. (USA)
- John Henry Gibson. For services to the community, especially Young People, in Bridlington, East Riding of Yorkshire. (Bridlington, East Riding of Yorkshire)
- Clive Gilchrist. Regional Health and Safety Co-ordinator, Midlands. For services to the Medical Research Council. (Caldicote, Cambridgeshire)
- Ajeet Singh Gill. For services to the community, especially Lions Clubs International, in Leicestershire. (Bushby, Leicestershire)
- Bridget Gill. For services to Nursery Education. (Welwyn, Hertfordshire)
- Robert William Pullman Gillespie. For services to the Citizens Advice Bureau in Faversham, Kent. (Faversham, Kent)
- Sheila Gilmour. For charitable services to the Crossroads Care Attendant Scheme. (Ballymoney, Antrim)
- Samuel Allen Glasgow. For services to Local Government. (Cookstown, Tyrone)
- Frank Turnbull Gledhill. Project manager, Shafton Youth and Community Group, Barnsley, South Yorkshire. For services to Young People. (Barnsley, South Yorkshire)
- Elizabeth Cameron, Lady Godsal, DL. For services to the community, especially the St John Ambulance Brigade, in Berkshire. (Reading, Berkshire)
- Sydney Golding. For charitable services in Cardiff. (Cardiff)
- Ann Gomersall. Probation Officer. For services to Prisoners and Staff at HM Prison Grendon. (Leighton Buzzard, Bedfordshire)
- Muriel Gordon. Secretary, Amhurst Park Action Group, working in partnership with the Metropolitan Police Service. For services to Community Safety. (London, N16)
- Linda Joyce Gore. Grade C2, Ministry of Defence. (London, N9)
- Jeffrey Goundrill. Head of Activities, HM Prison Leyhill, Prison Service. (Wotton-Under-Edge, Gloucestershire)
- Robin Ramsay Arvon Grant. For services to the British Olympic Appeal in Cambridgeshire. (Cambridge, Cambridgeshire)
- Betty Gray. For services to Table Tennis in Swansea, South Wales. (Treboeth, Swansea)
- Janet Gray. For services to Disabled Water Ski-ing. (Hillsborough, Down)
- Richard George Greenaway. R.D. Survey manager, Thames Region, Environment Agency. For services to the Environment. (Ashampstead Common, Berkshire)
- Margaret Gregg. Custodian. For services to Townend House, Troutbeck, Cumbria. (Windermere, Cumbria)
- Roy Arthur Griffin. For services to the community in Staffordshire. (Uttoxeter, Staffordshire)
- Donald Clive Griffiths. For services to the community, especially the Canoldir Male Voice Choir, in Birmingham, West Midlands. (Solihull, West Midlands)
- Haydn Griffiths. For services to the community, especially the Armthorpe Elmfield Band, in Doncaster, South Yorkshire. (Doncaster, South Yorkshire)
- Colin Sidney Grindy. Leading Fire-fighter, Derbyshire Fire and Rescue Service. For services to the Fire Service. (Buxton, Derbyshire)
- The Rev Canon Dennis Ernest Hale. Formerly chairman of Governors, King Alfred's College, Winchester, Hampshire. For services to Higher Education. (Southampton, Hampshire)
- Rosemary Celia Hall. For services to the community in Ash, Surrey. (Ash, Surrey)
- Vera Constance Corner Halligan. Vice-chairman, Sea Ranger Association, London. For services to Young People. (London, SW20)
- Hilda Hamilton. For services to the North East Kidney Patients' Association. (Hartlepool, Cleveland)
- Kathleen Margaret Hammond. Manager, Athelstan House, Bodmin, Cornwall. For services to Elderly People. (Bodmin, Cornwall)
- Margaret Elizabeth Hardcastle. Verger, Bulford Garrison, Ministry of Defence. (Salisbury, Wiltshire)
- Doreen Elvin Harding. Formerly Receptionist and Switchboard Operator, OFWAT. (Birmingham, West Midlands)
- Margaret Isabel Hardman. For services to disabled people in Liverpool. (Liverpool, Merseyside)
- Anne Harley. Human Resources director, Royal Society for the Protection of Birds. For services to Sustainable Development. (Dry Drayton, Cambridgeshire)
- Jacqueline Craven Harris. For services to Local Government and to Tourism in Bournemouth, Dorset. (Bournemouth, Dorset)
- Patricia Harris. Administrative Officer, Department for Work and Pensions. (Newcastle upon Tyne, Tyne and Wear)
- Lesley Ann Hart. Head, Senior Studies Institute, University of Strathclyde. For services to Lifelong Learning. (Giffnock, Renfrewshire)
- Neil Hawkins. For services to the Friends of Mayday University Hospital, Croydon, Surrey. (Warlingham, Surrey)
- Malcolm Haxby. Head, City Planning Group, Westminster City Council. For services to Local Government. (London, W4)
- Anna Elizabeth Carlisle-Haynes. Lecturer in Dance, Lewes Tertiary College, East Sussex. For services to Further Education. (Lewes, East Sussex)
- Agnes Wilma Head. For services to Guiding in Alnwick, Northumberland. (Alnwick, Northumberland)
- Dorothy Jean Head. For services to the community and to Young People in Penrhiwceiber, South Wales. (Penrhiwceiber, Rhondda Cynon Taff)
- John Hearn. For services to the community in Waterloo, London. (London, SE1)
- Gladys Helm. Grade E1, Ministry of Defence. (Preston, Lancashire)
- James Henderson. Port manager, Isle of Mull. For services to Port and Ferry Services. (Isle of Mull, Argyll and Bute)
- Margaret Caughie Hewitt. First assistant, Linthaugh Nursery School, Glasgow. For services to Early Years Education. (Barrhead, Renfrewshire)
- Lionel James Hill. For services to the Young Farmers' Movement. (Redditch, Worcestershire)
- Professor William Hills. Emeritus Professor of Engineering Design, University of Newcastle upon Tyne. For services to Technology Transfer. (Sunderland, Lancashire)
- Peter John Hinton. Workshop Superintendent, School of Chemical Engineering, University of Birmingham. For services to Higher Education. (Birmingham, West Midlands)
- Emma Hions. Member, Calderdale Metropolitan Borough Council. For services to Local Government and to the community. (Brighouse, West Yorkshire)
- Brian George Hiscutt. For services to Forensic Medicine. (Killyleagh, Down)
- Patricia Jean Hobbs. Assistant director (Management and Hostels), Leicester City Council. For services to Single Homelessness and to Rough Sleepers. (Leicester, Leicestershire)
- Eric Duff Hobson. Parks Development Officer, City of Edinburgh Council. For services to Local Government. (Edinburgh)
- Audrey Elizabeth Hodges. Administrative Officer, Department for Transport, Local Government and the Regions. (Southampton, Hampshire)
- Elizabeth Herbert Hogg. For services to the Northumbria Army Cadet Force. (Morpeth, Northumberland)
- Jane Holroyd. Nurse manager, Critical Care, Tameside and Glossop Acute Hospitals NHS Trust. For services to Health Care. (Manchester, Greater Manchester)
- Jeannie Hope. For services to the community in Cumbria. (Cockermouth, Cumbria)
- Lillian Maud Hopkin. For services to Local Government and to the community in Swansea. (Ravenhill, Swansea)
- Patrick John Horrigan. For services to the community in Weston-Super-Mare. (Weston-Super-Mare, Somerset)
- Kay Hounsham. For services to the Post Office and to People with Disabilities. (Farnborough, Hampshire)
- Pamela Jean Howard. Dance Project Officer, Hextable School, Kent. For services to Education and to the community. (Hextable, Kent)
- Timothy Nicholas Hughes. For services to the community in Priston, Somerset. (Bath, Somerset)
- Michael Hulme. Grade C2, Ministry of Defence. (London)
- Albert Percival Humphries. Sub Officer, Oxfordshire Fire Service. For services to the Fire Service. (Deddington, Oxfordshire)
- Ann Gibson Hunt. Veterinary Surgeon. For services to Animal Health. (Auchterarder, Perth and Kinross)
- Ann Mercy Hunt, JP. For services to the Tuberous Sclerosis Association. (Witney, Oxfordshire)
- Edward John Hunt. Manufacturing manager, Smiths Industries Aerospace. For services to the Defence and Aerospace Industries. (Cheltenham, Gloucestershire)
- Freda Hussain. For services to the community in Leicester. (Leicester, Leicestershire)
- George Edward Icke. For services to the community in Lower Penn, West Midlands. (Wolverhampton, West Midlands)
- Andrew Bennett Ingram. Farmer. For services to the Henley and District Agricultural Association, Oxfordshire. (Watlington, Oxfordshire)
- Adrian Watt Ions. For services to the community, especially the Alnwick International Music Festival, in Northumberland. (Alnwick, Northumberland)
- William Gerard Ireland. For services to the community in Keswick, Cumbria. (Keswick, Cumbria)
- Beverley Ann Ireson. For services to the Association of Teachers of Lip Reading to Adults. (South Lancing, West Sussex)
- George Irvine. For public service. (Enniskillen, Fermanagh)
- John Barry Jackson. Chairman, Jackson Building Centres Ltd. For services to Training in Lincolnshire. (Lincoln, Lincolnshire)
- Jacqueline Ann James. For services to disabled people in Wales, Europe, Russia and the former Soviet Union. (Gwernogle, Carmarthenshire)
- Craig Andrew Jamieson. Messenger. For services to the Benefits Agency in Bristol. (Stockwood, Bristol)
- James Henry Robert Johns. For charitable services to the Children's Unit, Derriford Hospital, Plymouth, Devon. (Whitsone, Devon)
- Paul Cyril Johnson. Senior Countryside Officer, Countryside Agency. For services to the Rural Environment. (Cirencester, Gloucestershire)
- Annie Johnstone. For services to the community in Motherwell, Lanarkshire. (Motherwell, Lanarkshire)
- David Snowdon-Jones. For charitable services in North East Wales. (Mold, Flintshire)
- The Rev Canon Mary Nerissa Anna Jones. For services to the community in Wood End, Coventry, West Midlands. (Bridport, Dorset)
- Jack Juby. Heavy Horseman. For services to Heavy Horses. (Hingham, Norfolk)
- Avtar Singh Kalha, JP. For services to the community in Newham, London. (Ilford, Essex)
- Hoshie Kanga. Formerly Range B, HM Treasury. (London, W12)
- Laurence Leslie Kaye. Higher Executive Officer, Table Office, House of Commons. (Lower Kingswood, Surrey)
- Denise Kelly. Facilities Representative, HM Board of Inland Revenue. (London, SE6)
- Gertrude Kenmure. For services to the community, especially Young People, in Wishaw, Lanarkshire. (Wishaw, Lanarkshire)
- Sydney Thomas Kent. Equal Opportunities Development Officer, University of Essex. For services to Higher Education. (Colchester, Essex)
- James Keogh. Chief Guard, Immigration and Nationality Directorate, Home Office. (London, SW2)
- Lt Cdr Arthur Edward Rance Keyte. For services to the Sea Cadet Corps in Hastings, East Sussex. (St Leonards on Sea, East Sussex)
- Alan Kilbey. Formerly Clerk to the Attorney General. (Chelmsford, Essex)
- Jack Naisbitt King. For services to the Police and to the community in Cambridgeshire. (Cambridge, Cambridgeshire)
- William King. For services to Ploughing. (Coleraine, Londonderry)
- William Frederick James Percival Kingsbury. For services to Sport in the Rhondda Valley, South Wales. (Porth, Rhondda Cynon Taff)*
- David Gilbert Gerald Kirby. Chair of Governors, Angley School, Cranbrook, Kent. For services to Education. (Benenden, Kent)
- Elizabeth Florence Knight. For services to the community in Olney, Buckinghamshire. (Olney, Buckinghamshire)
- Jeffrey Sonny Kruger. For services to the Jazz Music Industry. (Hove, East Sussex)
- Joseph Kusner. Formerly Teacher, Acland Burghley School, Kentish Town, London. For services to Education. (London, NW5)
- Martha Milligan Laing. For services to Save the Children in Edinburgh. (Edinburgh)
- Douglas Martin Lampkin. For services to Motorcycle Trials Riding. (Silsden, West Yorkshire)
- Nicholas Angell Lane. For services to the community in King's Lynn, Norfolk. (King's Lynn, Norfolk)
- John Carl Langtry. For services to the Fire Service. (Omagh, Tyrone)
- Nadim Ednan-Laperouse. Chief executive, WOW Toys. For services to the Toy Industry and to Export.
- Christine Lavery. For services to the Society for Mucopolysaccharide Diseases. (Little Chalfont, Buckinghamshire)
- Beatrice Law. For services to BLESMA in Blackpool, Lancashire. (Blackpool, Lancashire)
- Mary Robertson Law. For services to the community in Cupar, Fife. (Cuparmuir, Fife)
- Joseph Lawrence. For services to disabled people and to Wheelchair Sport. (Bradford, West Yorkshire)
- John Philip Lawson. Formerly chairman, Scottish Youth Hostels Association. For services to Youth Hostelling. (Anstruther, Fife)
- Jacqueline Leech. For services to the community in Chester, Cheshire. (Chester, Cheshire)
- Gloria Leighton. For services to the community in London. (London, NW8)
- Michelle Denise Lewis. For charitable services to Macmillan Cancer Relief and to the community, especially the Alder Hey Hospital, in Merseyside. (Rainhill, Merseyside)
- Joan Livingstone. Headteacher, St. Clement's Special School, Dingwall. For services to Special Needs Education. (Conon Bridge, Ross and Cromarty)
- John Lockhart. For services to the community, especially the Kingfisher Project, in Maidstone, Kent. (Maidstone, Kent)
- Pamela Mary Lodder. For services to the community in Solihull, West Midlands. (Nr Solihull, West Midlands)
- Dorothy Edith Lodge, JP. For services to the Halstead Day Centre, Essex. (Braintree, Essex)
- William Logan. Police Sergeant. For services to the community in Girvan. (Girvan, Ayrshire and Arran)
- Reginald Arthur Lomas. Head Groundsman, Cheltenham Race Course. For services to Horse Racing. (Stratford-upon-Avon, Warwickshire)
- David Longbourne. For services to the community, especially the Mere Museum, in Wiltshire. (Mere, Wiltshire)
- Andrew Wilson Lough. Deputy Estates manager, Lothian University Hospitals NHS Trust. For services to Health Care. (Lasswade, Midlothian)
- Helen Lubin. For services to the Safer Luton Partnership. (Luton, Bedfordshire)
- David Francis Luckett. For services to Training and to the community in Hampshire. (Fareham, Hampshire)
- Dorothy Gwen Ludlow. For charitable services to the Cobalt Unit Appeal Fund, Cheltenham, Gloucestershire. (Nr Pershore, Worcestershire)
- Wills Hugh Lynch. For services to the Fire Service. (Drumahoe, Londonderry)
- Patricia Margaret Ross MacArthur. School Crossing Patrol Guide, Bridgend Primary School, West Lothian. For services to the community. (Linlithgow, West Lothian)
- Barrie Ian MacDonald. For services to the ITC Library. (London, NW11)
- Donald Macdonald. For services to Ornithology in Sutherland. (Dornoch, Sutherland)
- Murdo John MacKenzie. For services to the Scottish Society for Autism. (Edinburgh)
- Catherine Jane Cameron Mackintosh. District Nurse. For services to Health Care in Inverness-shire. (Tomatin, Inverness-shire)
- Lorna MacLeod. Headteacher, Haddington Infant School, East Lothian. For services to Education. (Edinburgh)
- Keith Alfred Madders. For services to the Zimbabwe Trust. (Epsom, Surrey)
- Cindy Lou Maguire. Prison Strategy manager, Lifeline Project. For services to Prisoners. (Warrington, Cheshire)
- Paul Oliver Maguire. Senior Adviser, HM Board of Customs and Excise. (London)
- Margaret Mahood. For services to the Victims of Crime. (Lisburn, Antrim)
- John Mallaburn. Senior Storekeeper, Ministry of Defence. (Richmond, North Yorkshire)
- Roger Stuart Manwaring. Registration Executive, HM Land Registry, Lord Chancellor's Department. (Corse Lawn, Gloucestershire)
- Charles Markwick. Security Guard, Pegasus. For services to the Crown Prosecution Service. (Crawley, West Sussex)
- Brian Ralph Le Marquand. For services to the community in Jersey. (Jersey, Channel Islands)
- Susan Patricia Marsh, JP. For services to the community in Tameside, Manchester. (Manchester, Greater Manchester)
- Bernadette Teresa Marshall. Senior Nurse manager and Professional head of Midwifery, West Midlands Hospitals NHS Trust. For services to Health Care. (Nuneaton, Warwickshire)
- David Ivor Mason. Senior Custody Officer, Securicor Custodial Services Ltd. For services to Harrow Crown Court. (Ruislip, Middlesex)
- Michael John Mason. For services to the Boys' Brigade in Kendal, Cumbria. (Kendal, Cumbria)
- Glenys Irene Matthews. Specialist Diabetic Nurse, Royal Gwent Hospital, Newport. For services to Health Care. (Newport, Gwent)
- Pauline Matthews. Sister, Endoscopy Unit, Dorset County Hospital. For services to Health Care. (Dorchester, Dorset)
- Maria Maw. For services to Maria's Care in Uganda. (Ingleton, Lancashire)
- Gary McAllister. For services to Association Football. (Altrincham, Cheshire)
- Catherine Mary McCaul. For services to Education. (Dungannon, Tyrone)
- David Charles McClintock, TD. For services to Botany. (Sevenoaks, Kent)
- Jane Maybin McConnell. For services to Education. (Ballyclare, Antrim)
- Marion McCowan. For services to Badminton Coaching in Dumfries. (Dumfries)
- Alessie McCrossan. For services to the community. (Belfast)
- John Ross McCutchan. For services to the community in Hailsham, East Sussex. (Near Polegate, East Sussex)
- Robert Stewart McDonald. For services to the Association of Learning Providers and to Training. (Tamworth, Staffordshire)
- Jean McGarrell. Multi-Site manager, NAAFI. For services to the Defence Industry. (Fallingbostel 29683, Germany)
- Yvonne McGregor. For services to Cycling. (Stoke-on-Trent, Staffordshire)
- Ernest George McGuffin. For services to the Packaging Industry. (Warrenpoint, Down)
- Professor Thomas Baird Clarkson McGuffog. Vice-chairman, SITPRO. For services to e-business. (York, North Yorkshire)
- James McHugh. Chairman, Plains Countryside Park, Lanarkshire. For services to the community. (By Airdrie, Lanarkshire)
- June McHugh. For services to the Police. (Belfast)
- Susan Veronica McIntyre. For services to Piping. (Inverness, Inverness-shire)
- Colin McKay, JP. For services to Scouting in Tynemouth, Tyne and Wear. (North Shields, Tyne and Wear)
- James Kevin McKenna. For public service. (Belfast)
- Joseph Wright McKernan. Revenue Constable, HM Board of Customs and Excise. (London)
- Susan McKiernan. For services to Disabled Sport. (Sheffield, South Yorkshire)
- William George Grimmond McLeod. Teacher. For services to the community in Forfar. (Forfar, Angus)
- David McMullan. For public service. (Newtownards, Down)
- Patricia Mary McMurchy. Correspondence Officer, Employment Tribunals Service, Department of Trade and Industry. (Ashford, Kent)
- Alison McNeil. Shepherd. For services to Agriculture in Dumfriesshire. (Castle Douglas, Dumfries)
- Marie McStay. For services to Health Care. (Lisburn, Antrim)
- Terence William McSweeney. Inspector, Cleansing Service. For services to the Corporation of the City of London. (Rainham, Essex)
- Richard Henry Meads. Business Planning and Performance manager, Transport for London. For services to Public Transport. (Chesham, Buckinghamshire)
- Allison Stewart Melville. For services to Guiding in Methven, Perthshire. (Methven, Perth and Kinross)
- Beryl Patricia Frances Melville. For services to the Royal Air Forces Association. (Alness, Ross and Cromarty)
- William Millan. For services to the Bennie Museum in Bathgate, West Lothian. (Bathgate, West Lothian)
- James Alexander Milliken. For services to Tourism. (Portrush, Antrim)
- June Cameron Hunter Mills. For services to the community in Wiltshire. (Amesbury, Wiltshire)
- Mary Sheila Mills. For services to the community, especially the Bromley Community Bereavement Service, in London. (Hayes, Kent)
- Parveen Mirza. For services to Community Relations in Nottingham. (Nottingham, Nottinghamshire)
- Valerie Margaret Miskimmon. For public service. (Bangor, Down)
- Fiona Mitchell. Children's Community Nurse, West Lothian. For services to Health Care. (West Calder, West Lothian)
- Ian Mitchell. For services to WaterAid. (Leeds, West Yorkshire)
- John Andy Edwin Moar. Veterinary Surgeon. For services to Animal Health in Shetland. (Lerwick, Shetland)
- Brian Molloy. Director, Canterbury and Thanet Schools Counselling Service. For services to Special Needs Education. (Canterbury, Kent)
- John Monk. For services to the community in Meridale, Lincolnshire. (Mablethorpe, Lincolnshire)
- Virginia Maria Moon. For charitable services, especially to Tenovus, in Cardiff. (Marshfield, Cardiff)
- Kathryn Mary Mooney. Operations Caseworker, HM Board of Inland Revenue. (Warrington, Cheshire)
- Paula Kitson-Moore. Teacher, St. Stephen's Church of England Primary School, Lewisham, London. For services to Education. (Beckenham, Kent)
- Jean Morgan. Chief Reporter, Press Gazette. For services to Journalism. (Croydon, Surrey)
- Richard Douglas Morgan. For services to the Citizens Advice Bureau in Kingston upon Thames, Surrey. (Surbiton, Surrey)
- Maisie George Morris. For services to the community in Pontardawe, South Wales. (Pontardawe, Neath Port Talbot)
- David Morrison. Senior Planner, Planning Services, Scottish Executive. (Edinburgh)
- Anthony John Moyes. For services to the community in Leeds, West Yorkshire. (Leeds, West Yorkshire)
- Ann Mules. For charitable services to the community in Penarth, Vale of Glamorgan. (Penarth, The Vale of Glamorgan)
- Timothy Murray. Senior Executive Officer, Department for Transport, Local Government and the Regions. (Bexhill-on-Sea, East Sussex)
- William John Charles Musgrave. Chair of Governors, Southwark Park School, London. For services to Education. (Goudhurst, Kent)
- Harold Samuel Mutters. For services to Young People in South Wales. (Gilwern, Monmouthshire)
- Diana May Payne-Myers. For services to Dance. (London, W9)
- Delphine Newsome. For services to the St Andrew's Ambulance Service. (Monifieth, Angus)
- Elizabeth Nicholson. Director, Shelter Scotland. For services to Homeless People. (Edinburgh)
- Stephen William Norris. Senior Coxswain, Inshore Lifeboat and Rescue Organisation. For services to Marine Safety in Freshwater, Isle of Wight. (Freshwater, Isle of Wight)
- Christine Rosemary North. For services to the Cornwall County Record Office. (Truro, Cornwall)
- Eve Geraldine North, JP. For services to the Administration of Justice and to the community in Berkshire. (Reading, Berkshire)
- Derek Nuttall. For services to the National Printing Heritage Trust, Chester. (Chester, Cheshire)
- Donald Nuttall. For services to the Church Lads and Church Girls Brigade, Manchester. (Manchester, Greater Manchester)
- Gerard Gabriel O'Callaghan. For services to the Police. (Belfast)
- Maureen Patricia O'Hagan. President, National Association of Early Years Professionals.
- For services to Education. (London, N6)
- Wilfrid Bernard O'Neill. Head of Classics, Ossett School, Ossett, West Yorkshire. For services to Education. (Leeds, West Yorkshire)
- Margaret Taylor Oliver. For services to the Wheelchair Dancing Association in Cornwall. (Newquay, Cornwall)
- Margaret Rose Onion. For services to the community in Measham, Derbyshire. (Swadlincote, Derbyshire)
- Catherine Margaret Organ, JP. For services to Local Government and to the community in Stirling. (Killearn, Stirling and Falkirk)
- Samuel John Orr. For services to Agriculture. (Downpatrick, Down)
- William Norman Orr. For services to the Royal Air Forces Association. (London)
- Colin John Ovenden. For services to the community in Preston, Lancashire. (Preston, Lancashire)
- Edwin Nicholas Owen. For services to the Shropshire Deaf Children's Society. (Shrewsbury, Shropshire)
- Michael James Page. For services to the community in Northwood, Middlesex. (Northwood, Middlesex)
- Robert Forster Pailor. For services to the Environment. (Hartlepool, Cleveland)
- Jyotindra Keshavlal Pandya. General Medical Practitioner, Tottenham, London. For services to Health Care. (London, N14)
- Margaret Ann Parker. Head, Adult and Community Learning, Ridge Danyers College, Cheshire.
- For services to Further Education. (Stockport, Cheshire)
- Robert Charles Parkinson. Consultant, Astrium Space Infrastructure Business Unit. For services to the Space Industry. (Aylesbury, Buckinghamshire)
- Indravadan Pushottamdas Patel. For services to the Community Relations in North West London. (Stanmore, Middlesex)
- David Andrew Thomson Paton. Emergency Planning Officer, Fife NHS Board. For services to Health Care. (Glenrothes, Fife)
- Irene Patterson. For services to the Multiple Sclerosis Society in Ayrshire. (Ayr, Ayrshire and Arran)
- Victor Michael Pattinson. Sergeant, Nottinghamshire Constabulary. For services to the Multiple Sclerosis Society in Mansfield. (Nottingham, Nottinghamshire)
- Joyce Pattison. Formerly School Bursar, Hattersley High School, Tameside. For services to Education. (Hyde, Greater Manchester)
- Carole Anne Payne. For services to Family Links Around Grimsby, Lincolnshire. (Cleethorpes, Lincolnshire)
- Diana Surtees Payne, JP. For services to the Community Legal Service in Milton Keynes, Buckinghamshire. (Woburn Sands, Buckinghamshire)
- Rosemary Peck. For services to Fostering. (Ballymoney, Antrim)
- June Angelina Rose Pell. Personal assistant. For services to British Waterways. (Harrow, Middlesex)
- Margaret Joan Penston. Astronomy Advisor, Qualifications and Curriculum Authority. For services to Astronomy and its Popularisation. (Barton, Cambridgeshire)
- Diane Louise Penzer. Counter manager, Passport Agency, Home Office. (Peterborough, Cambridgeshire)
- John Percival. Critic and writer. For services to Dance. (London, WC1N)
- George Charles Nicholas Peter Perren, JP. For services to the London Firefighters Retired Members' Association. (Wembley, Middlesex)
- Rita Doreen Perry. Revenue Officer, HM Board of Inland Revenue. (Yarm, Cleveland)
- Maria Vlasta Phillips. For services to the community, especially the Citizens Advice Bureau, in Norwich, and in the Czech Republic. (Norwich, Norfolk)
- Valerie Phillips. Manager, Day Care Centre and Nursery, University of Exeter. For services to Higher Education. (Ottery St Mary, Devon)
- Eileen Valerie Pilfold. Grade E1, Ministry of Defence. (Camberley, Surrey)
- June Pirie. Assistant Procurement Officer, Scottish Executive. (Edinburgh)
- Christopher Hamilton Plomer. For services to Cricket in Angus. (Arbroath, Angus)
- Frederick Plumb. For services to the Water Industry in the East of Scotland. (Cupar, Fife)
- Nigel Graham Pocknell. Force Welfare Officer, Gwent Police. For services to Retired Police Officers. (Cwmbran, Gwent)
- Edith Pocock. For services to the Pensioners' Association in Norwich and Norfolk. (Wymondham, Norfolk)
- Catherine Pollock. Vice-chairman, Lomond and Argyll Primary Care NHS Trust. For services to Health Care. (Lochgilphead, Argyll and Bute)
- Richard Clive Ponman. Grade B1, Cabinet Office. (Worcester Park, Surrey)
- Olwen Pool. For services to the community in Leicester. (Leicester, Leicestershire)
- Paul Henry Popham. Sub Officer (Retained), South Wales Fire Service. For services to the Fire Service. (Bridgend, Mid Glamorgan)
- Patricia Mary Powell. Chairman, League of Friends, Willesden Hospital. For services to Health Care. (Harrow Weald, Middlesex)
- Elizabeth Anne Poynter. For services to the Institute of Petroleum.
- James Edward Pratt. Head, Pathology Section, Northern Research Station, Forestry Commission. (West Linton, Lothian)
- Roy William Pratt. For services to the Honda Imps Junior Motorcycle Display Team in Newham, London. (Maldon, Essex)
- Kenneth Lindley Prayag. Compliance manager, HM Board of Inland Revenue. (London, E17)
- William Henry Prescott. For services to the Environment. (Loughgall, Armagh)
- David Colville Mostyn Prichard. For services to the community, especially Educational and Charitable Trusts, in Dorset. (Sherbourne, Dorset)
- Matt Pritchett. Cartoonist, The Daily Telegraph. For services to Journalism. (London, E14)
- Keith Frederick Quigley. Supervisor, Surface Ships, Devonport Management Ltd. For services to the Defence Industry. (Plymouth, Devon)
- Agnes Quinn. For services to the community, especially Disabled Children, in Merseyside.
- Diana Mary Rainbow. For services to Young Deaf Activities in Buckinghamshire.
- Colin Rains. For services to Disabled Sport. (Edwalton, Nottinghamshire)
- Christine Savitri Rajah. Head, Health Service, City University. For services to Higher Education. (London, N1)
- Marian Ramsdale. Principal Officer, HM Prison Drake Hall, Prison Service. (Newcastle, Staffordshire)
- Peter John Rand. Chairman, Peter Rand Group. For services to the Hospitality Industry. (Kenilworth, Warwickshire)
- Mary Rose Read. Personal secretary, Dover District Council, Kent. For services to Local Government. (Dover, Kent)
- Richard Foster Reade. Community Constable, Dumfries Police. For services to the Police. (Dumfries)
- Martin Jonathan Reece. For services to the Fire Service Benevolent Fund. (Liverpool, Merseyside)
- John Edward Reilly. Director of Academic Administration, University of Kent and of UK Socrates-Erasmus Office. For services to Higher Education and to the Erasmus Programme. (Canterbury, Kent)
- Agnes Rennie. Commissioner, Crofters Commission. For services to Crofting in Lewis and Harris.
- Kathleen Anne Reynolds. For services to the Soldiers', Sailors' and Airmen's Families Association, Lorn Division, Argyll and Bute. (Oban, Argyll and Bute)
- Frances Patricia Rice. Personal assistant to the Lords of Appeal, House of Lords. (London, SW2)
- Francis William Ombler Richardson. For services to the community, especially the Northern Heavy Horse Society, in Driffield, East Riding of Yorkshire. (Driffield, East Riding of Yorkshire)
- Jane Other Ritchie. Partnership manager, Durham Business and Education Executive. For services to Business and Education Links. (Leyburn, North Yorkshire)
- Gerald Prothero Robbins. Member, Rogiet Community Council. For services to the community in Monmouthshire. (Caldicot, Monmouthshire)
- Graham Eifion Roberts. Chairman, North Wales Exporters Club. For services to Export. (Colwyn Bay, Conwy)
- Susan Ann Lloyd-Roberts. Special Correspondent, BBC. For services to Broadcast Journalism. (London, N10)
- Mavis Robinson. Macmillan Nurse. For services to people with Asbestos Disease. (Leeds, West Yorkshire)
- William Blair Robinson. For services to the Police. (Belfast)
- John Alexander Rodger. For services to the Blaenavon Partnership, South Wales. (Grosmont, Monmouthshire)
- Yvonne Neville-Rolfe. For services to Prisoners and the Prison Service Chaplaincy. (Berkhamsted, Hertfordshire)
- Paul Allen Rose. Security Controller, BAE Systems Marine Ltd. For services to the Defence Industry. (Barrow in Furness, Cumbria)
- Barry Ross. Sub Officer (Retained), Tyne and Wear Metropolitan Fire Brigade. For services to the Fire Service. (Birtley, Tyne and Wear)
- Hilary Barbara Ross. Formerly assistant director of Finance, Stockport Metropolitan Borough Council. For services to Local Government. (Poynton, Cheshire)
- Alan John Rowe. For services to the community, especially Hospiscare, in East Devon. (Sidmouth, Devon)
- Colin Patrick Russell. For services to the Legal Advice Centre in Bethnal Green, London. (Cirencester, Gloucestershire)
- Ian Anthony Russell. Chairman, Russell Organisation. For services to Tourism in Norfolk. (Lingwood, Norfolk)
- Ronald Sandford. For services to the British Pensioners' Trade Union Association, in Merseyside. (Liverpool, Merseyside)
- Ann Kathleen Saunders. For services to the Jockeys' Association of Great Britain. (Newbury, Berkshire)
- Ann Loreille Saunders. Historian, Honorary Editor to the London Topographical Society and to the Costume Society. (London, NW11)
- Robin Sinclair Saunders. For services to the community in Eynsham, Oxfordshire. (Witney, Oxfordshire)
- Stewart Henry Saunders. Managing director, MANWEB. For services to the Electricity Industry. (Kirkcaldy, Fife)
- Geraldine Margaret Schofield. Head, Regulatory Affairs, Unilever. For services to Biotechnology Transfer. (Yardley Hastings, Northamptonshire)
- Harry Schofield. For services to the community in Armthorpe, Doncaster. (Doncaster, South Yorkshire)
- James Alexander Scott. For services to the community and the Preservation of Vintage Vehicles. (Magherafelt, Londonderry)
- Peter William Scott. President, the Wooden Spoon Society. For charitable services. (Pinner, Middlesex)
- John William Seale. Business director, DFTS, British Telecommunications plc. For services to the Defence Industry. (Chippenham, Wiltshire)
- John Senior. Formerly Grade 9, Metropolitan Police Service. For services to the Police. (Colchester, Essex)
- Abdul Karim Shakoor. Outreach Worker, Cartwheel Community Arts. For services to Art in Manchester. (Manchester, Greater Manchester)
- Florence May Shearman. For services to the community, especially Sports, in Coggeshall, Essex. (Coggeshall, Essex)
- Ann Patricia Shiner. Sub-Postmistress. For services to the community in Warminster, Wiltshire. (Warminster, Wiltshire)
- Carolyn Silver. Grade D, Ministry of Defence. (London)
- Carmen Orinthia Simpson. Usher, Court Service, Lord Chancellor's Department. (London, NW10)
- Hal John Harold Simpson. For services to disabled people. (Belfast)
- Margaret Violet Simpson. Central Functions Senior assistant, NHS Executive, Department of Health. (Liverpool, Merseyside)
- Mary Elizabeth Sims. For charitable services to the Cancer Research Campaign in Derbyshire. (Borrowash, Derbyshire)
- Ramindar Singh. For services to Community Relations in Bradford. (Pudsey, West Yorkshire)
- Sheila Mary Sinton. For services to Education. (Tandragee, Armagh)
- Irene Skelton. Director of Midwifery, Queen Mother's Hospital, Glasgow. For services to Health Care. (Houston, Renfrewshire)
- Dorothy Leonore Slyfield. For services to the Guide Association's UK Training and Activity Centres. (Heathfield, East Sussex)
- Andrew Philip Smith. Grade C1, Ministry of Defence. (Salisbury, Wiltshire)
- Denise Smith. For services to the Citizens Advice Bureau in Dalkeith. (Edinburgh)
- Frank Yeoman Smith. Formerly Coxswain/Second Mechanic, Salcombe Lifeboat, Devon. For services to Marine Safety. (Salcombe, Devon)
- Heather Marjorie Smith. Formerly Divisional Support Team manager, HM Board of Inland Revenue. (Hoddesdon, Hertfordshire)
- Jeremiah Alfanso Smith. For services to Community Relations in Derby. (Derby, Derbyshire)
- Maureen Smith. For services to OXFAM and to the community in Edinburgh. (Edinburgh)
- Patrick Cecil Smith. For services to Schools Sport in the East Midlands. (West Bridgford, Nottinghamshire)
- Philip Smith. For services to Nature Conservation on Sefton Coast, Merseyside. (Salisbury, Wiltshire)
- Rosalind Ailsa Hamilton Smith. Area Officer, Scottish Natural Heritage. For services to Nature Conservation. (Pitcairngreen, Perth and Kinross)
- Brian Geoffrey Souter. Deputy Headteacher, Southlands High School, Chorley, Lancashire. For services to Education. (Blackburn, Lancashire)
- Raymond Speakman. For services to the Bolton Hospice, Lancashire. (Bolton, Greater Manchester)
- Geoffrey Ernest Spence. For services to the War Pensions Committee in Sussex. (Brighton, East Sussex)
- Ivor Spencer, DL. For services to the Guild of International Professional Toastmasters. (London, SE21)
- Terence George Spinks. For services to Boxing and to charitable services. (Chadwell Heath, Essex)
- Christopher George Squibb. Engineering manager, Southern Vectis Omnibus Co. Ltd. For services to the Bus Industry. (Newport, Isle of Wight)
- Lionel Wilfred Steele. International Sales manager, Alvis Vehicles Ltd. For services to the Defence Industry. (Coventry, Warwickshire)
- Christopher Thomas Alfred Stephens. For services to the RSPCA. (Oadby, Leicestershire)
- Barrington Thomas Stevens. Chair, Shetland Telecoms Advisory Committee. For services to the community. (Dunrossness, Shetland)
- Thomas McColl Stewart. For services to Braemar Mountain Rescue. (Gairloch, Ross and Cromarty)
- Penelope Florence Stubbs, JP, DL. For services to the community in Ashford, Kent. (Ashford, Kent)
- Jack Sturgess. Chairman, Bramshaw Parish Council, Hampshire. For services to the community. (Lyndhurst, Hampshire)
- Myra Karina Styles. Director of Finance, Employment Tribunals Service, Department of Trade and Industry. (Birmingham, West Midlands)
- Carol Ann Sweeney. Lecturer, Worker's Education Association] For services to Adult Education. (Dorking, Surrey)
- Jacqueline Frances Sweeney. For services to Industrial Relations in the Magistrates' Courts Service. (Bolton, Greater Manchester)
- Joy Swift. For services to Tourism through Murder Weekends. (Liverpool, Merseyside)
- Patricia Sykes. For services to Energy Efficiency. (Totnes, Devon)
- Stuart Ainley Sykes. Leader, Windmill Group. For services to Young People in Blackpool, Lancashire. (Blackpool, Lancashire)
- Brian Norman Symington. Director, Royal National Institute for Deaf People. For services to Deaf People. (Belfast)
- Helen Tarvit. Warden, Swan Court Sheltered Housing. For services to Elderly People in Eyemouth, Berwickshire. (Eyemouth, Berwickshire)
- John Alfred Taylor. Grade C2, Ministry of Defence. (Frampton Cotterell, Bristol)
- William Frank Taylor. For services to the St. John Ambulance Brigade in Hertfordshire. (Hertford, Hertfordshire)
- William Gordon Taylor. Formerly Corporate manager. Fife Council. For services to Local Government. (Balmullo, Fife)
- Peter James William Terry. Administrative assistant, Department for Work and Pensions. (Crayford, Kent)
- Cenydd Thomas, QPM. For services to the community in Pontypridd, South Wales. (Nr Pontypridd, Rhondda Cynon Taff)
- David Thomas. Chair, Bridgend Community Health Council. For services to Health Care. (Bridgend, Mid Glamorgan)
- David Edward Thomas. Storyteller. For charitable services. (Grasmere, Cumbria)
- Elizabeth Thomas. Member, Scottish Council of Voluntary Organisations. For services to Young Unemployed People. (Manswood, Glasgow)
- Linda Thomas. Chief executive, Arch and Team Leader, Potteries Young Homeless Project.
- For services to Homeless People in Stoke-on-Trent. (Stoke-on-Trent, Staffordshire)
- Ronald Thomas. Formerly Site manager, Wey Valley School, Weymouth, Dorset. For services to Education. (Weymouth, Dorset)
- David Walter Thompson. For services to the community in Great Yarmouth, Norfolk. (Great Yarmouth, Norfolk)
- Ian Fraser Thomson. Constable, Tayside Police. For services to the Police. (Auchterarder, Perth and Kinross)
- John Thomson. Member, Visiting Committee, HM Prison Greenock. For services to Prisoner Welfare. (Dunoon, Argyll and Bute)
- Donald Edward Titley. For services to Education in the Diocese of Lichfield, Staffordshire. (Stoke-on-Trent, Staffordshire)
- George James William Titmuss. For services to the National Flying Club and Pigeon Racing. (Wheathampstead, Hertfordshire)
- Michael John Traynor. Formerly PE Principal Officer, HM Prison Service. (Doncaster, South Yorkshire)
- Anthony Turnbull. Project manager, HM Board of Inland Revenue. (Wallsend, Tyne and Wear)
- Derek Turnbull. Project manager, Vickers Defence Systems. For services to the Defence Industry. (Blyth, Northumberland)
- Margaret Howieson Turner. For services to the community in Cambeltown, Argyllshire. (Campbeltown, Argyll and Bute)
- Paul Digby Lowry Turner. Tutor, Centre for Medieval and Renaissance Studies, Oxford. For services to the Classics. (Oxford, Oxfordshire)
- Peter Jules Turner. Head of Community Services, Capital Radio. For services to Community Broadcasting. (London, SE24)
- Trevor Turner. For charitable services to the community in Monmouthshire. (Abergavenny, Monmouthshire)
- Matthew Edward Twidale. Farmer. For services to the Sugar Beet Industry and to the National Farmers Union. (Newark, Nottinghamshire)
- Joan Mary Twigge. For services to the North Staffordshire Special Adventure Playground. (Newcastle, Staffordshire)
- Dorothy Beatrice Jenny Tyler. For services to Athletics. (Sanderstead, Surrey)
- Colin Underwood. Formerly Sergeant, Hertfordshire Constabulary. For services to the Police Federation. (Hertfordshire)
- David Reginald Vale. For services to the community, especially Heritage, in Lincolnshire. (Lincoln, Lincolnshire)
- Manjul Karsandas Vasant. General Dental Practitioner. For services to the Faculty of General Dental Practitioners. (Croydon, Surrey)
- Brian Leonard Veale. For services to the Institute of Road Transport Engineers. (Oswestry, Shropshire)
- Christine Hilary Wade. For services to Trading Standards in Essex. (Milton Keynes, Buckinghamshire)
- Paula Wadsworth. Headteacher, Pontnewydd Primary School, Torfaen. For services to Education. (Abergavenny, Monmouthshire)
- Joseph Walker, JP. Formerly Member, Durham County Council. For services to the community. (Stanley, Durham)
- Mary Waller. For services to the Linwood Mentally Handicapped School, Bournemouth, Dorset. (Bournemouth, Dorset)
- Vivien Wallis. For charitable services. (Ascot, Berkshire)
- Ronald Wallwork. For services to the community in Newmarket, Suffolk. (Moulton, Suffolk)
- Catherine Isabella Watkins. Grade E1, Ministry of Defence. (Innsworth, Gloucestershire)
- James Watson. Car Park Attendant, Leeds Metropolitan University. For services to Higher Education. (Leeds, West Yorkshire)
- William Humphrey Watson, MC. For services to Medicine in Developing Countries and to the community in Shropshire. (Shrewsbury, Shropshire)
- John Henry Wayborn. For services to Four Acres Primary and West Town Lane Junior Schools, Bristol. (Bristol)
- Clive George Weatherer. For services to the community, especially Blind People, in Staffordshire. (Stafford, Staffordshire)
- David Michael Webster. Farm manager, Crichton Royal Farm. For services to Agricultural Research and Training. (Dumfries)
- Jeffery Edward West. Roadsweeper. For services to the community in Beer, Devon. (Beer, Devon)
- Kenneth John West. Bereavement Services manager, Cardiff County Council. For services to Burial and Cremation. (Thornhill, Cardiff)
- Rachel Elizabeth Whittaker, JP. For services to the Metropolitan Police Committee and to the Metropolitan Police Authority. (London, SW1P)
- Brian Wildish. Postman. For services to the community in Perth. (Scone, Perth and Kinross)
- Jennifer Wilkinson. For services to Agriculture and to the community in Cumbria. (Carlisle, Cumbria)
- Alexander Williams. Football and Community Development Officer, Manchester. For services to Young People. (Stockport, Cheshire)
- John David Williams. County Emergency Planning Officer, West Sussex County Council. For services to Emergency Planning Management. (Burgess Hill, West Sussex)
- John Paull Williams. Managing director, Giro Engineering Ltd. For services to the Defence Industry. (Old Alresford, Hampshire)
- John Richard Williams. Coxswain, Port St. Mary Lifeboat, Isle of Man. For services to Marine Safety. (Port St Mary, Isle of Man)
- Kathleen Maud Williams. Formerly Deputy head Teacher, Ashfield Special School, Liverpool.
- For services to Careers Education and Guidance. (Runcorn, Cheshire)
- Mary Florence Williams. For charitable services in Cockermouth, Cumbria. (Cockermouth, Cumbria)
- Patricia Williams. General Medical Practitioner, Inverness. For services to Health Care.
- Phyllis Mary Williams. Learning Support assistant, Curry Rivel Primary School, Somerset.
- For services to Special Needs Education. (Langport, Somerset)
- Willow Williams. For services to the Voluntary Sector in Wrexham, North Wales. (Higher Gwersyllt, Wrexham)
- Kevin Ian Wilson. Facilities manager, Citex. For services to Agriculture. (Wallsend, Tyne and Wear)
- William Noel Winslade. For services to Meteorology in Somerset. (Bridgwater, Somerset)
- Oksana Wolstenholme. Head of Nursing/Midwifery, Bradford Hospitals NHS Trust. For services to Health Care. (Bradford, West Yorkshire)
- Michael Christopher Woodford. Group managing director, KeyMed Ltd. For services to Road Safety. (Thorpe Bay, Essex)
- Edward Thomas Workman. For services to the community in Burwash, East Sussex. (Burwash, East Sussex)
- Amelia Victoria Wright. For services to the War Widows Association. (London, E10)
- Trevor Martin Wright. For services to Disadvantaged People. (Belfast)
- Wally Wright. Reserve manager, Caerlaverock National Nature Reserve. For services to Conservation in Solway, Dumfries-shire. (Caerlaverock, Dumfries)
- Anthony William Zotti. Area Housing manager, Department of Community Services. For services to the community in the City of London. (Enfield, Middlesex)

== Military And Services ==
=== Order of the Bath ===
==== Royal Navy ====
===== Knights Commander of the Bath (K.C.B.) =====
- Vice Admiral Jonathon Band.

===== Companions of the Bath (C.B.) =====
- Rear Admiral Christopher David Stanford.
- Rear Admiral Rees Graham John Ward.

==== Army ====
===== Companions of the Bath (C.B.) =====
- Maj Gen Peter Anthony Chambers, M.B.E. Late Royal Army Ordnance Corps.
- Maj Gen John Christopher Blake Sutherell, C.B.E. Late The Royal Anglian Regiment.

==== Royal Air Force ====
===== Knights Commander of the Bath (K.C.B.) =====
- Air Marshal Graham Eric Stirrup, CB, AFC. Royal Air Force.

===== Companions of the Bath (C.B.) =====
- Air Vice-Marshal Peter Liddell. Royal Air Force.
- Air Vice-Marshal Hector Gavin Mackay, O.B.E, AFC. Royal Air Force.

=== Order of the British Empire ===
==== Royal Navy ====
===== Commanders of the British Empire (C.B.E.) =====
- The Ven Simon Jefferies Golding. QHC, Royal Navy.
- Capt (now Commodore) David Andrew Harry McGregor Smith, ADC. Royal Navy.

===== Officers of the British Empire (O.B.E.) =====
- Cdr (Acting Captain) Ross Albon. Royal Navy.
- Lt Col William Andrew Canning. Royal Marines.
- Cdr (Acting Captain) Malcolm John Darley Farrow. Royal Navy.
- Cdr Stephen Walter Garrett. Royal Navy.
- Cdr (now Captain) Christopher Bryan Neave. Royal Navy.
- Cdr William Kenneth Ridley. Royal Navy.

===== Members of the British Empire (M.B.E.) =====
- Cdr (now Acting Captain) Peter Charles Chapman-Andrews, LVO. Royal Navy.
- WO (Writer) Philip Edward Carter.
- WO (Writer) Roger George Collings.
- Lt Cdr Peter Frank Cooper. Royal Navy.
- WO (Radio Supervisor) Peter Ronald Evans.
- Lt Cdr Richard Forrest Evans. Royal Naval Reserve.
- Capt (now Major) William Fergusson Hannah. Royal Marines.
- Lt Cdr Jon Andrew Lawler. Royal Navy.
- WO (Diver) Anthony Austin Lawrence.
- Lt Cdr Gordon Lindsay. Royal Navy.
- WO (Weapon Engineering Artificer) Roland Francis Lock.
- Lt Cdr Frank Nowosielski. Royal Navy.
- Lt Gordon Ian Ronaldson. Royal Navy.
- WO (Radar) David Kenneth Rowles.
- WO (Marine Engineering Mechanic) Garry Edward Smith.
- Lt Cdr David Vernon Stanton. Royal Navy.
- Lt Col Philip Anthony Wilson. Royal Marines.

==== Army ====
===== Commanders of the British Empire (C.B.E.) =====
- Brig Alex Frederick Birtwistle, O.B.E. Late The Queen's Lancashire Regiment.
- Col Stephen Carey Howe. Late Royal Army Medical Corps.
- Brig John James Keeling. Late Royal Regiment of Artillery.
- Col Bridget Christina McEvilly, ARRC. Q.H.N.S., late Queen Alexandra's Royal Army Nursing Corps.
- Maj Gen Brian Peter Plummer. Late The Royal Welch Fusiliers.
- Brig Andrew Richard Evelyn De Cardonnel Stewart, O.B.E. Late The Light Dragoons.
- Brig Peter Anthony Wall, O.B.E. Late Corps of Royal Engineers.

===== Officers of the British Empire (O.B.E.) =====
- Col Neil Alexander Crerar Baverstock, M.B.E. Late The Royal Irish Regiment.
- Lt Col David William Brown. The Royal Green Jackets.
- Lt Col John Francis Burke. The Princess of Wales's Royal Regiment.
- Col Ann Clouston, ARRC. Late Queen Alexandra's Royal Army Nursing Corps, Territorial Army.
- Lt Col Stephen Robert Cooper. The Royal Logistic Corps.
- Col Paul Raymond Farrar. Late The Parachute Regiment.
- Lt Col Peter Jocelyn Hingston. Coldstream Guards.
- Lt Col David Montgomery Leigh. The Parachute Regiment.
- Lt Col Mervyn Allden Lloyd. The Royal Welch Fusiliers.

===== Members of the British Empire (M.B.E.) =====
- WO Class 2 Alexander McDougall Anderson. Adjutant General's Corps.
- Maj Graham Kenneth Ashcroft. The Parachute Regiment.
- Maj Neville Stewart Bagley. Corps of Royal Engineers.
- Sgt Michael Kevin Bagnall. Royal Regiment of Artillery.
- WO Class 1 Christopher Barnes. The Parachute Regiment.
- WO Class 2 Kevan Watson Bell. Intelligence Corps.
- WO Class 2 Ronald Gordon Christie. The Highlanders.
- Bombardier Martin David Corfield. Royal Regiment of Artillery.
- WO Class 1 Stephen Mark Curry. Army Air Corps.
- Maj Catherine Mary Martin Davies. 52nd Lowland Regiment, Territorial Army.
- Sgt Ian Davis. Royal Corps of Signals.
- WO Class 2 Russell Carl Povey Duggan. Grenadier Guards.
- WO Class 1 John Craig Dutton. Royal Tank Regiment.
- WO Class 1 Michael Edward Eastough. Corps of Royal Engineers.
- WO Class 1 Joseph James Fairbairn. Royal Corps of Signals.
- WO Class 1 Tyrone Farr. Corps of Royal Engineers.
- Maj Marc Jonathan Finch. Corps of Royal Engineers.
- Maj Damar Ghale. Queen's Gurkha Engineers.
- Maj Robert James Ross Gillanders. The Royal Irish Regiment.
- Lt Col Colin Edward Gilmour. The Highlanders.
- Maj Rodney George Hinchcliffe. Corps of Royal Engineers, Territorial Army.
- Maj Richard Michael Scott-Hopkins. Army Air Corps.
- Maj William John Hunter, BEM. The Royal Logistic Corps, Territorial Army.
- WO Class 1 Ian Peter Jennings. Army Physical Training Corps.
- Maj Edward Owen Ellis Jones. Royal Regiment of Artillery.
- Capt Martin William Jones. The Royal Regiment of Wales.
- Maj William Ian Merrett Jones. The Royal Logistic Corps.
- Maj Paul Michael Kelly. Royal Corps of Signals.
- WO Class 1 Sharon Patricia Kirwan. Adjutant General's Corps.
- WO Class 2 John Lynes. Intelligence Corps.
- Acting Capt Hazel Reid Mackintosh, TD. 2nd Battalion Army Cadet Force.
- Staff Sgt Neil Hugh McCallum. Army Physical Training Corps.
- WO Class 2 Keith Merrie. Royal Corps of Signals.
- Maj Philip Charles Thomas Monk. The Royal Anglian Regiment, Territorial Army.
- WO Class 1 Kevin James Morton. Corps of Royal Electrical and Mechanical Engineers.
- Maj Bruce William Park. The Queen's Lancashire Regiment.
- Maj Michael Poland. Royal Corps of Signals.
- Capt Graham Hugh Pollard. Adjutant General's Corps.
- Capt Claud Preira. The Royal Logistic Corps.
- Cpl Terrance Bernard Pugh. The Queen's Royal Hussars.
- Staff Sgt Noel David Pusey. Adjutant General's Corps.
- Maj Peter Sean Rafferty. The King's Regiment.
- WO Class 1 Edmond Everett Rees. Corps of Royal Electrical and Mechanical Engineers, Territorial Army.
- WO Class 2 Graham Rees. Corps of Royal Engineers.
- Maj Andrew Mark Howard Rixon Reynolds. Royal Regiment of Artillery.
- Maj Timothy Wallace Russell. The Royal Dragoon Guards.
- WO Class 2 Mark Andrew Saunders. Royal Regiment of Artillery.
- Maj Michael John Levett-Scrivener. Corps of Royal Engineers.
- Capt Barry Roy Short. The Royal Logistic Corps.
- Maj Nigel Iorwerth Taylor. Corps of Royal Electrical and Mechanical Engineers.
- WO Class 1 Mark Thomas. The Royal Logistic Corps.
- Maj Paul Henry Tilley. Royal Regiment of Artillery.
- The Reverend Nicholas John Wall. Royal Army Chaplains' Department, Territorial Army.
- Lt Col Murray Courtenay Whiteside. Army Air Corps.
- WO Class 1 John Wisener. The Royal Dragoon Guards.

==== Royal Air Force ====
===== Commanders of the British Empire (C.B.E.) =====
- Air Commodore Christopher Nigel Harper. Royal Air Force.
- Air Vice Marshal Grahame Jones, M.B.E. Royal Air Force.
- Air Commodore David Walker, AFC. Royal Air Force.

===== Officers of the British Empire (O.B.E.) =====
- Wing Cdr David Best. Royal Air Force.
- Group Capt Michael Paul Colley. Royal Air Force.
- Wing Cdr Graham Peter Farnell. Royal Air Force.
- Wing Cdr David James Keenan. Royal Air Force.
- Wing Cdr David John Richards. Royal Air Force Volunteer Reserve.
- Group Capt Martin Ashley Sharp. Royal Air Force.
- Wing Cdr Nigel Edward Wharmby. Royal Air Force.

===== Members of the British Empire (M.B.E.) =====
- Sqn Ldr Nicholas John Barr. Royal Air Force.
- Sqn Ldr Ian Derek Cambrook. Royal Air Force.
- WO Grahame Barrie Cooke. Royal Air Force.
- Sgt Mark David Davies. Royal Air Force.
- Wing Cdr Ian Derbyshire. Royal Air Force.
- Sqn Ldr Timothy John Fenton. Royal Air Force.
- WO John Francis Gaynor. Royal Air Force.
- Sqn Ldr Donald George Halliday. Royal Air Force.
- Flt Lt David John Jarvis. Royal Air Force.
- Flt Sgt Eamon Vaughan Jenkins. Royal Air Force.
- WO Barry Frederick Jenner. Royal Air Force.
- Senior AC Mark Alan Moody. Royal Air Force.
- Master Air Loadmaster Raymond Matthew Morley. Royal Air Force.
- Flt Sgt Paul Nicholson. Royal Air Force.
- Chief Technician Keith Picken. Royal Air Force.
- Sqn Ldr John Martin Scully. Royal Air Force.
- Flt Sgt Richard Patrick Seager. Royal Air Force.
- Wing Cdr Peter Michael Stokes. Royal Air Force.
- Master Air Loadmaster Kenneth Cedric Tucker. Royal Air Force.
- Sqn Ldr Stanley Walker, AE. Royal Auxiliary Air Force.
- Flt Sgt Richard Ian Welsh. Royal Air Force.
- Flt Sgt David William Macrae Whalley, BEM. Royal Air Force.
- WO David Richard Wightwick. Royal Air Force.
- Junior Technician Adrian Paul Williams. Royal Air Force.

=== Queen's Police Medal (Q.P.M.) ===
==== England And Wales ====
- Paul Bompas. Superintendent, Dorset Police.
- Phillip James Buckley. Constable, Greater Manchester Police.
- Richard David Coldwell. Constable, West Yorkshire Police.
- Antony Joseph Crimmens. Assistant chief Constable, Northumbria Police.
- David Steven Field. Detective Sergeant, Metropolitan Police Service.
- Geoffrey Anthony Foote. Detective Sergeant, Metropolitan Police Service.
- Paul Gower. Constable, British Transport Police.
- Stephen Michael Green. Chief Constable, Nottinghamshire Police.
- Brian Leonard Haynes. Detective Constable, Hertfordshire Constabulary.
- Carole Anne Howlett. Deputy assistant commissioner, Metropolitan Police Service.
- Ramesh Kumar. Constable, West Midlands Police.
- Alastair Hope McWhirter. Deputy chief Constable, Wiltshire Constabulary.
- Arthur Gilles Provoost. Chief Superintendent, Greater Manchester Police.
- Melvyn William Shore. Formerly Detective Superintendent, West Mercia Constabulary.
- Barry John Smith. Assistant chief Constable, Ministry of Defence Police.
- Michael James Todd. Assistant commissioner, Metropolitan Police Service.
- Michael Venables. Inspector, South Yorkshire Police.
- Maria Assumpta Wallis. Assistant chief Constable, Sussex Police.

==== Scotland ====
- Andrew Cameron. Chief Constable, Central Scotland Police.
- Kenneth McInnes. Assistant Chief Constable (Designated Deputy), Fife Constabulary.
- Graeme James Pearson. Assistant Chief Constable, Strathclyde Police.

==== Northern Ireland ====
- Richard John Abbott. Inspector, Police Service of Northern Ireland.
- Raymond Myles. Detective Sergeant, Police Service of Northern Ireland.
- Leemond William Joseph Robinson. Sergeant, Police Service of Northern Ireland.

=== Queen's Fire Service Medal (Q.F.S.M.) ===
==== England And Wales ====
- Kevin Brian Patrick Arbuthnot. Deputy chief Fire Officer, West Yorkshire Fire Service.
- Thomas Martin Carroll. chief fire officer, Cambridgeshire Fire Brigade.
- Peter Stephen Coles. Deputy chief Fire Officer, North Wales Fire Service.
- John Michael Elliott. chief fire officer, Cumbria Fire Service.
- John Alan Holmes. Assistant chief Fire Officer, Tyne and Wear Metropolitan Fire Brigade.

==== Scotland ====
- Charles George Newcombe Stewart. Senior assistant Inspector of Fire Services.
- Alastair MacDonald Wyse. Acting Firemaster, Fife Fire and Rescue Service.

==== Northern Ireland ====
- James Joseph McCallum. Divisional Officer II, Northern Ireland Fire Brigade.
- Thomas Alexander Withers. Senior Divisional Officer, Northern Ireland Fire Brigade.

=== Queen's Volunteer Reserves Medal (Q.V.R.M.) ===
==== Royal Navy ====
- Cdr Susan Margaret Passmore. RD, Royal Naval Reserve.

==== Army ====
- Col Christopher Lee Argent, TD, DL. Late The Princess of Wales's Royal Regiment, Territorial Army.
- Maj Jonathan James Campbell Boreham, TD. Royal Army Medical Corps, Territorial Army.
- Maj Philip Barrie Corfield. Royal Corps of Signals, Territorial Army.
- Colour Sgt Ann Frances Russell, CPM.

== Diplomatic Service and Overseas ==
=== Knights Bachelor ===
- Rudolph Ion Joseph Agnew. For services to international human rights and conservation.
- Deryck Maughan. For services to British business and commercial interests in the USA.

=== Order of St Michael And St George ===
==== Honorary Knights Commander (K.C.M.G.) ====
- Roger Bridgland Bone, C.M.G. HM Ambassador, Brasilia.
- Dr Emyr Jones Parry, C.M.G. Formerly Political director, Foreign and Commonwealth Office.
- David Albert Thompson. Formerly chairman, Commonwealth Institute.
- Nigel Cooper Thompson, C.B.E. For services to international trade and development.

==== Companions of St Michael and St George (C.M.G.) ====
- Mark John Spurgeon Allen. Counsellor, Foreign and Commonwealth Office.
- Bruce Elliot Cleghorn. British High commissioner, Kuala Lumpur.
- Dr Peter Salmon Collecott. Chief Clerk, Foreign and Commonwealth Office.
- Linda Joy Duffield. British High commissioner, Colombo.
- Gloria Dorothy, Baroness Hooper. For services to UK-Latin American relations.
- Colin Andrew Munro. Formerly Deputy High Representative, Mostar.
- William Nagel. For services to UK-German relations.
- Professor Otto Pick. For services to UK-Czech relations and democracy in Central Europe.
- Michael Penarthur Merrick Rice. For services to UK-Bahrain relations and UK-Arab understanding.
- Anthony John Wiggins. Formerly UK Member of the European Court of Auditors.

=== Order of the British Empire ===
==== Knight Commander of the Order of the British Empire (K.B.E.) ====
- Thomas George Harris, C.M.G., H.M. Consul-General, New York.
- Peter James Mason. For services to international trade.
- William Mark Tully, O.B.E. For services to broadcasting and journalism overseas.

==== Commanders of the British Empire (C.B.E.) ====
- John Lance Beresford Browne. For services to British business interests in China.
- Brian Page Constant. For services to British commercial interests in the Middle East.
- Anthony Douglas Cragg. Sculptor. For services to art.
- Elma Tryphosa Dangerfield, O.B.E. For long and distinguished service to international relations.
- Barry Alan Crompton Gibb. For services to music and entertainment.
- Maurice Ernest Gibb. For services to music and entertainment.
- Robin Hugh Gibb. For services to music and entertainment.
- Peter Francis Joseph Irvine. Formerly Deputy Representative, European Schools Board.
- Professor Mary Henrietta Kaldor. For services to global governance and democracy.
- Thea Musgrave. Composer and conductor. For services to music.
- Christopher Thomas Bremner Purvis. For services to UK-Japanese relations.
- John Rocha. For services to the fashion industry.
- Duncan John Rushworth Taylor. Deputy head of Mission, British Consulate-General New York.

==== Officers of the British Empire (O.B.E.) ====
- Jasim Ahmed. For services to British commercial interests in Asia.
- Ramon Douglas Alberga, QC. For public service, Cayman Islands.
- John Brian Arnold. For services to British commercial interests in Indonesia.
- Robin Aubrey Comyns Berkeley. For services to British commercial interests overseas.
- Keith Biddle. For services to law and order in Sierra Leone.
- Thomas Marshal Boyd. For services to rural development in Africa.
- William Alexander Graham Boyle. For public service, Bermuda.
- Keith Edward Bush. For services to the promotion of democracy in Central Europe.
- Robert Callard. First Secretary, Foreign and Commonwealth Office.
- William Barry Douglas. Concert pianist. For services to music.
- Howard Ronald Drake. Director of Investment, British Consulate-General New York.
- John Henry Freel. For services to British business and community interests in Saudi Arabia.
- Brigid Catherine Gardner. Principal, St George's British International School, Rome.
- Jeanne-Marie Gescher. For services to British interests in China.
- Roderick Charles Gow. For services to British business interests in the USA.
- Colin Graham. For services to British opera and music in the USA.
- Richard George Grimshaw. For services to agricultural development overseas.
- The Rev Canon Dennis Albert John Gurney. For services to the community in the Middle East.
- Richard Farrar Hardwick. Director, British Council, Karachi.
- Joan Philomena Hunt. For services to cancer care in southern Spain.
- Shanker Iyer. For services to British commercial interests in Singapore.
- Ivor Levene. For services to British trade and investment in Africa and the Middle East.
- Scott Livingstone. First Secretary, Foreign and Commonwealth Office.
- Derrick Isaac Marcus. For services to the British community in São Paulo.
- Thomas Geoffrey Martin. Formerly Head, European Commission Office, London.
- Raymond Mason. For services to sculpture and to Anglo-French relations.
- Ian Massey. For services to the aerospace industry overseas.
- Col Alexander Robert Renwick McAslan. For services to international standards in demining.
- William Moore. For services to British commercial interests overseas.
- John Hamish Forbes Murphy. For services to British commercial interests in Italy.
- Helen Rosemary Nellthorp. First Secretary, Foreign and Commonwealth Office.
- Patrick Eldred Owens M.B.E., HM Consul, British Consulate General New York.
- David John Parker. Formerly Senior Management Officer, British Embassy Jakarta.
- Roger Howard Patey. For services to British commercial interest in Egypt.
- Dr Brian Derek Perry. For services to veterinary science in developing countries.
- Lynn Rachel Redgrave. For services to acting and the cinema and to the British community in Los Angeles.
- Patricia Margaret Salti. For services to women's and children's rights in the Middle East.
- Arnold Martin Schwartzman. For services to the British film industry in the USA.
- Donald John Sloan. Formerly Director, British Council, Sudan.
- Daniel Wybert Mansel Smith. For services to UK-Norway relations.
- The Rev John Gregory Stevens. For services to leprosy and the community, Calcutta.
- Leslie John Stokes. For services to British business interests in Taiwan and The Philippines.
- Llewellyn Vorley. For service to the community, Bermuda.
- Philip Warner. For services to British commercial interests in the USA.
- Paul Robert Wiseman. Head, British School, Rio de Janeiro.
- Dr Teresa Lyn Wright. For services to the study of Hepatitis and liver disease in the USA.
- Andrew Michael Graham-Yooll. For services to broadcasting and journalism in Argentina.

==== Members of the British Empire (M.B.E.) ====
- Sarah Ann Elizabeth Allen. For public service, Montserrat.
- Elizabeth May Asfaw. For services to the community, Ethiopia.
- Margaret Hilda Barnes. For services to HIV/AIDS awareness and education in China.
- Eva Jane Benjamin. For services to the local community, St. Helena.
- Marian Von Benko. For services to the community, Hungary.
- Ronald Frederick Blastock. Formerly head of Meetings Usher, UK Rep, Brussels.
- Edmund Arthur Blennerhassett. For services to British interests and the community, Panama.
- Margaret Lynn Broadbent. Secretary, Royal Society of Arts, USA.
- Pauline Brookes. For services to the local community, Botswana.
- Peter Douglas Brown. Director, British School, Trieste.
- Andrea Theresa Bryan, JP. For public service, Cayman Islands.
- Michael Carbine. First secretary, Foreign and Commonwealth Office.
- Fiona May Carr. For services to music and teaching, Uganda.
- Liza Jane Carr. Third secretary, Foreign and Commonwealth Office.
- Alan Garth Copcutt. Trade Promotion manager, British Consulate-General Brisbane.
- Allan Bryant Crawford. For services to the community, Tristan da Cunha.
- Elizabeth Crosley. Vice-Consul, British Consulate-General Milan.
- Celia Terease Davies. Consular Officer, British High Commission Nassau.
- Barbara Day. For services to UK-Czech cultural relations.
- Christine Winifred Dew. Vice-chairman, The Victoria League for Commonwealth Friendship.
- Kara Frasse. Personal assistant, British Consulate-General New York.
- Jennifer Joan Gardner. Personal assistant, British Consulate-General Los Angeles.
- Michael John Gibbons. For services to youth development in Namibia.
- Dr Barbara Erica Gibbs. For services to the environment and the community, Montserrat.
- The Rev William Stephen Griffith. For services to the community, Damascus.
- Charles Herbert Groves. For services to the British community, Cyprus.
- Richard Rodney Groves. For services to community relations in Bulgaria.
- Fredrick Remaul Hassell. Director, Senior Islanders Programme, Bermuda.
- Gordon Keith Hazell. Consul, British Consulate Tenerife.
- Mary Lilla Frances Heaslip. For service to the community, Ethiopia.
- Linda Patricia Humphrey. For services to healthcare in Ghana.
- Timothy John Hunt. For services to the British community in Boston, USA.
- David Charles Stewart Jackson. For services to the British community in Portugal.
- Jacqueline Elizabeth Jaidy. For services to healthcare in Jerusalem.
- Edmund Paul Johnson. For services to the British community in Libya.
- Elizabeth Jane Jones. For services to the British community in Zimbabwe.
- Sarah Jane Bruce Jones. For services to British commercial interests in Latvia.
- Mikaail Kavanagh. For services to conservation and wildlife in Malaysia.
- Walter Nigel Lee. British Honorary Consul, Salvador.
- Ian MacDonald. For services to the British community in Libya. (London, NW11)
- Geoffrey Thomas Mace. Second secretary, Foreign and Commonwealth Office.
- Jennifer Mary Masefield. For services to the local community, Bermuda.
- Megan McDowell. Pro-Consul, British Consulate-General, New York.
- Isabel Naylor De Mandez. For services to the British community, Huelva, Spain.
- Dr Anne Merriman. For services to healthcare in Uganda.
- Frederick Ellsworth Ming. For service to the community, Bermuda.
- Herbert Moore. Welfare Controller, British Ex-Services League.
- Catherine Wardlaw Nicol. For services to the local community, Sialkot, Pakistan.
- Gillian Margaret Njeru. Consular Officer, British High Commission Nairobi.
- Maud Robertson Ramsay Nomiyama. For services to the British community in western Japan.
- Steven Carl O'Connor. 'Know How' Fund Officer, British Embassy Prague.
- Kenneth Oliphant. Second secretary, Foreign and Commonwealth Office.
- Jacqueline Mary Ross Palmesino. British Pro-Consul, Lugano.
- Dr Chimanbhai Somabhai Patel. British Consular Correspondent, Kisumu, Kenya.
- Nest Ogwena Pierry. For services to the British Community in Paris.
- Russell Lewis Pullen. First secretary, Foreign and Commonwealth Office.
- Ian Jeremy Reakes. Consular Attache, British Deputy High Commission Bombay.
- Josephine Requena. For services to the community, Gibraltar.
- Royal Stephenson Robinson. For public service, Turks and Caicos Islands.
- Jean Satterthwaite. For services to the local community in Bangalore.
- Dr Madeleine Agnes Sharp. For services to human rights and humanitarian causes in Vietnam, Laos and Cambodia.
- Gail Marilyn Sidnell. Second secretary, Foreign and Commonwealth Office.
- Derek Charles Smith. For services to the United Nations Association of Great Britain and Northern Ireland.
- Terence George Spruce. For services to the community, Falkland Islands.
- Patrick Joseph Sweetman. For services to the British community in California.
- Dr Stephenson Anthony Tomlinson. For services to the community, Cayman Islands.
- John Stephen Walker. For services to British interests in Vietnam.
- Robert Charles Wheeler. For services to British commercial interests in Brazil.
- The Rev Anita Pamela Wilding. For services to education and the community in East Africa.

=== Royal Red Cross (A.R.R.C.) ===
- Sqn Ldr Lauren Hurst. Princess Mary's Royal Air Force Nursing Service.
- Sqn Ldr Patricia Bernadette Hymas. Princess Mary's Royal Air Force Nursing Service.

=== Colonial Police And Fire Service Medal (C.P.M.) ===
- Andrew Albert Perera. Chief inspector, Royal Gibraltar Police Force.

== The Commonwealth ==
=== Bahamas ===
==== Order of St Michael And St George ====
===== Knights Commander (K.C.M.G.) =====
- Geoffrey Adams Dinwiddie Johnstone, C.M.G. For public service.
- Albert Joel Miller, M.V.O., M.B.E., Q.P.M., C.P.M. For service to the community.

===== Companions of St Michael and St George (C.M.G.) =====
- Bernard Kenneth Bonamy, L.V.O., Q.P.M. For service to law and order.
- William Augustus Saunders. For service to the tourism industry.
- His Excellency Vernon Joseph Symonette, MP. For service to The Bahamas.

==== Order of the British Empire ====
===== Officers of the British Empire (O.B.E.) =====
- Anthony Clifford Allen. For service to the banking industry.
- Eva Portia Schaffner. For service to the growth and development of The Bahamas.
- Robert Percival Sweeting, MP. For service to the community.
- Peter Alexander Thompson. For service to the banking industry.

===== Members of the British Empire (M.B.E.) =====
- Raphael Nathaniel Cartwright. For service to the business community.
- Bishop Archilaus William Cooper, JP. For service to the community.
- Roosevelt Curry. For service to the growth and development of the construction industry.
- Charles (George) Edward Kelly. For service to business and tourism.
- Willis Michael Levarity. For service to the construction industry.
- Veronica Marshall. For service to the growth and development of The Bahamas.
- Roswell Irvin Sawyer, JP. For service to the fishing industry and the community.

==== British Empire Medal (B.E.M.) ====
- The Rev Clemon Clifford Ferguson. For service to the community.
- The Rev Dr Allen Joseph Mills. For service to the community.
- The Rev Copeland Morley. For service to the religious community of Abaco.
- Joseph Norris. For service to the community.
- Alpheus John Ramsey, JP. For service to the community.
- Freda Russell. For service to education.
- Terry Marylyn Laing-Russell. For service to the community.
- The Rev Samuel Sands. For service to the community.
- The Rev Roland John Swain. For service to the community.

==== Queen's Police Medal (Q.P.M.) ====
- Larry Anthony Ferguson. For services to the Royal Bahamas Police Force.
- Leeland Russell. For services to the Royal Bahamas Police Force.

=== Barbados ===
==== Order of the British Empire ====
===== Commanders of the British Empire (C.B.E.) =====
- Alister O'Brien Campbell. For service to the insurance industry.
- Alfred Henderson Clarke, QC. For service to the legal profession.
- Kenneth Rudolph Hewitt. For service to accounting and financial services in Barbados.

===== Officers of the British Empire (O.B.E.) =====
- Arthur St Clair Farmer. For service to the community.
- Jean Cynthia Robinson. For service to horticulture.
- Lloyd Bismarck Weekes. For public service.

===== Members of the British Empire (M.B.E.) =====
- Thelma Parris. For service to the community.
- Clarence Festus Thompson. For services to the development of music.

=== Belize ===
==== Members of the British Empire (M.B.E.) ====
- The Rev Charles David Goff. For service to the community.
- Allan Miguel Sharp. For service to sport.

=== Grenada ===
==== Order of the British Empire ====
===== Officers of the British Empire (O.B.E.) =====
- Glenda Mason-Francis. For service to education.
- Julien David Rapier. For service to the community.

===== Members of the British Empire (M.B.E.) =====
Dorothy Chichester. For service to nursing and to business.

==== British Empire Medal (B.E.M.) ====
- Joseph Eric Barriteau. For service to the fishing industry.
- Cebert Bernadine. For service to the fishing industry.

=== Papua New Guinea ===
==== Order of the British Empire ====
===== Knight Commander of the Order of the British Empire (K.B.E.) =====
- The Hon Moi Avei, MP. For services to the community and to politics.

===== Commanders of the British Empire (C.B.E.) =====
- Theophilus George Constantinou. For services to business, commerce and the community.
- Garth McIlwain, O.B.E. For services to finance and banking.

===== Officers of the British Empire (O.B.E.) =====
- Professor Robert (Robin) Arthur Cooke. For services to health in Papua New Guinea.
- David George Guinn, M.B.E. For services to the community.
- Hunter Richard Dick Hagon. For services to the coffee industry.
- Graham Hawthorne. For services to the aviation industry.
- Mark Kasau. For services to health and the community.
- Elizabeth Catherine Whitten. For service to libraries and the community.
- Lwai Witne. For service to the community.

===== Members of the British Empire (M.B.E.) =====
- Makarai Bove. For service to the community.
- Garin David Gelua. For service to the community and the church.
- John Kaolea Golpak. For service to the community.
- Nori Guip. For service to law and order.
- Lucas Stephanas Kanath. For service to the community.
- Simongi Kangiong. For service to the community.
- Andrew Samlal Laboi. For service to education.
- Yawal Aselem Kamalua Mazewin. For service to agriculture.
- Noel Raymond Smith. For services to banking and commerce.
- Laufa Tapora. For service to the community.
- Siek Jong Tjoeng. For service to the community.
- Marie Monica Uvillio. For service to banking.

==== Imperial Service Order (I.S.O.) ====
- Thomas Morabang. For service to the judiciary.

==== British Empire Medal (B.E.M.) ====
- Luai Aita. For public service.
- Kinango Aur. For service to the community.
- Taliustiga Bola. For service to education.
- Thomas Sambure Cain. For services to the Correctional Service.
- Dr Lyn Calvert. For service to the Health Department.
- Komb Dei. For services to business and community leadership.
- Adira Gumasa. For service to the community.
- Kouoru Hanaia. For service to the community.
- Councillor Siltu Malto Karlo. For service to the community.
- Reuben Manambo. For services to the Correctional Service.
- Evera Meakoro. For service to religion.
- Mata Momo. For service to the judiciary.
- Maria Towai Nepel. For service to public health in Papua New Guinea.
- Francis Pana. For services to the forestry industry.
- Kevau Buruka Sabadi. For public service.
- Som Tali. For service to the community.
- Ishmael Tanda. For service to the Royal Papua New Guinea Constabulary.
- Toroga Johns Wong. For service to banking.
- Edward Song Fan Zeng. For services to business, community and sports.

==== Order of the British Empire (Military) ====
===== Officers of the British Empire (O.B.E.) =====
- Col Yaura Sasa. Papua New Guinea Defence Force.

===== Members of the British Empire (M.B.E.) =====
- Lt Col Job Kasa. Papua New Guinea Defence Force.
- Lt Col Blasius Augustine Kavanamur. Papua New Guinea Defence Force.
- Chief WO Sam Manase. Papua New Guinea Defence Force.

==== British Empire Medal (Military) (B.E.M.) ====
- WO Paul Mambu. Papua New Guinea Defence Force.
- Chief WO Paulus Rumints. Papua New Guinea Defence Force.

=== Saint Christopher And Nevis ===
==== Order of the British Empire ====
===== Officers of the British Empire (O.B.E.) =====
- Charles McDougal Brisbane. For public service.

===== Members of the British Empire (M.B.E.) =====
- Robert Ezrick Manning. For public service.

=== Saint Vincent and the Grenadines ===
==== Order of St Michael And St George ====
===== Companions of St Michael and St George (C.M.G.) =====
- Christian Ivor Martin. For service to the financial sector.

==== Order of the British Empire ====
===== Officers of the British Empire (O.B.E.) =====
- Joel Fitz-Gerald Huggins. For service to the electricity industry.
- Leopold Parnel Errie Stoddard. For service to law and order.

===== Members of the British Empire (M.B.E.) =====
- Pearl Agatha Elritha Best. For service to education.
- Rhonda Patricia Fraser. For service to the community.
- Alderic Peter Williams. For service to law and order.

=== Tuvalu ===
==== Order of the British Empire ====
===== Officers of the British Empire (O.B.E.) =====
- The Hon Lagitupu Tiputa Tuilimu. For public and community service.

===== Members of the British Empire (M.B.E.) =====
- Ailesi Apelaamo. For public and community service.
- Emily Koepke. For public and community service.
- Dr Faalesa Pitoi. For public service.

==== British Empire Medal (B.E.M.) ====
- Tagisia Kilei. For public and community service.
- Falefou Luka. For service to the community.
- Manoa Tehulu. For service to the community.
