= Ann Kettle =

British historian

Ann Kettle FSA
- Occupations: Historian; Academic

Academic work
- Discipline: History
- Sub-discipline: Economic history Social history
- Institutions: University of St. Andrews

Ann Julia Kettle FSA FRHistS FRSA OBE is a historian and Honorary Senior Lecturer at the University of St Andrews.

== Career ==
Kettle has a BA and MA from the University of Oxford. She taught medieval history at the University of St Andrews for more than 40 years, during which her research focussed on English local history, history of women in the Middle Ages, and the social structure of mediaeval England. She was a member of the Scottish National Committee for the National Committee of Inquiry into Higher Education, published in 1997.

Kettle was elected as a fellow of the Society of Antiquaries of London on 3 March 1972. She is also a fellow of the Royal Historical Society and the Royal Society of Arts. She was awarded an OBE for services to higher education in the 2002 New Year Honours.

== Select publications ==
- Kettle, A. J. 2004. "Arthurian Myths and Alchemy: The Kingship of Edward IV", History: The Journal of the Historical Association. 89, 115–116.
- Kettle, A. J. 2002. "Pilgrimage in Medieval England", English Historical Review. 117, 161–162.
- Kettle, A. J. 2000. "Religious life for women, c.AD1100-1350. Fontevraud in England", Journal of Ecclesiastical History. 51, 785–786.
- Kettle, A. J. 1999. "Daughters, Wives and Widows after the Black Death: Women in Sussex, 1350-1535", History: The Journal of the Historical Association. 84, 717-717.
- Kettle, A. J. 1995. "Ruined Maids: Prostitutes and Servant Girls in Later Mediaeval England", in Edward, R.R. and Ziegler, V. (eds) Matrons and marginal women in mediaeval society, vol 3. Boydell and Brewer, 19–31.
