= Christopher German =

American oceanographer

Christopher Russell German MBE is a British-born American oceanographer at the Woods Hole Oceanographic Institution.

== Early life and career ==
Christopher German was born and raised in Rochester, England where his parents and grandparents used to work at the naval base. As a student at the University of Cambridge, he obtained B.S. in chemistry and geology and Ph.D. in marine geochemistry. For two years, from 1988 to 1990, Chris was a NATO postdoctoral researcher in the United States where he worked with John Edmond at the Massachusetts Institute of Technology and took dives in DSV Alvin. In 2005 Chris had moved to Woods Hole Oceanographic Institution where he became senior scientist in its Geology and Geophysics Department and then served its chief scientist on board of deep-submergence vehicle. In 2007 he was awarded Sc.D. degree from his alma mater.

== Awards ==
- 2002 – MBE Medal, for services to Marine Science
- 2014 – Humboldt Prize
