= Papal visit to the United Kingdom =

Papal visit to the United Kingdom may refer to:

- Pope John Paul II's visit to the United Kingdom, 1982
- Pope Benedict XVI's visit to the United Kingdom, 2010
