= Loram =

Loram may refer to:

- Mark Loram, a speedway racer
- Lorazepam, a drug
- Loram Maintenance of Way, a railroad track maintenance company
