= Karen Harrison =

British train driver and trade unionist

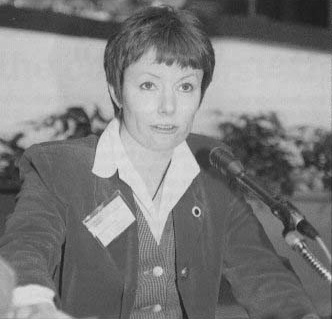
- Harrison in 1995
- Born: 16 November 1960; Glasgow, Scotland
- Died: May 2011 (aged 50); Oxford, England
- Occupations: Secondman and train driver (1979–1997) trade union officer (UNISON) (1997–2003) law undergraduate at Harris Manchester College, University of Oxford
- Known for: Being the face of women train drivers on British Rail; first woman to preside over ASLEF conference; trade union and political campaigner

Karen Harrison (16 November 1960 – May 2011) was one of the first generation of women in Britain to be employed as a secondman in 1979 taking the first step to eventually becoming a train driver. She was an active trade unionist and political campaigner.

== Early years ==
Karen Harrison, the daughter of a customs officer, was born in Glasgow and raised in London, attending St. Michael's Convent Grammar School, Finchley. She left school at 16, working at London's Marquee Club during the heyday of punk rock before applying to British Rail in 1977 with the aim of becoming a train driver. The pathway to driver started as a traction trainee (previously as cleaner on steam locomotives), and then "secondman" (previously fireman on steam locomotives).

Harrison's struggle to become a train driver began immediately when she appeared for her interview with the British Rail recruitment officers. They had assumed their latest applicant would be male; upon meeting Harrison, they realised otherwise. They tried to dissuade her away from a locomotive footplate career, and instead towards secretarial duties. However, Karen refused to be put off and persisted to become a train driver.

== Railway and trade union career ==
During 1979, six woman overcame the prejudice of the time and commenced their careers as traction trainees, the first step towards becoming drivers. Karen was the last of these woman joining British Rail as a traction trainee on 12 Nov 1979 at Old Oak Common depot. Harrison eventually began her driver training after transferring to Selhurst depot on the Southern Region in March 1985. She remained at Selhurst for a short period before transferring to Marylebone depot (now part of Chiltern Railways) in 1988, where she was to become one of three women drivers.

There was much resistance to her presence on the footplate from both managers and colleagues, who vehemently disapproved of the presence of a woman in their masculine world. Ten years of sustained harassment – both verbal and physical – abated after her transfer to Marylebone depot.

Harrison has described her railway career as "ten years of hell, ten years of heaven. It's a bit tough when you're only a teenager and you're hit by this gigantic tidal wave of hate. To a lot of the men, I was the proverbial turd in the swimming pool. Every day I walked into the mess room, I'd be s***ting myself, but strutting about pretending not to be. I couldn't let them create no-go areas for me; that would've established a precedent and we couldn't have that, could we? It would've been the beginning of the end." In the BBC documentary People's Century, she put her survival over that first decade down to "Glaswegian family genes, rich in stubbornness" and the support of the old-style Communists at the depot: "It was like being raised by wolves. They did a grand job, bless them."

After moving to Marylebone depot, she rapidly advanced through the ranks of her trade union, having joined the train drivers' union, ASLEF, on her first day on the railway, as was required at that time owing to the closed shop practice at that time within British Rail. Harrison became the first woman to hold various positions in ASLEF, culminating in 1995 when she was elected to the highest position a lay member can hold: presiding over ASLEF's annual conference (the Annual Assembly of Delegates) during which time she was an active trade unionist and political campaigner. However, a bout of meningitis ended her train driving career as she was declared medically unfit to drive trains. Being on the then Economic League employment blacklist, her future job options were extremely limited, but she was able to find employment as a full-time officer for the trade union UNISON. She was extremely successful in representing union members at employment tribunals, more than holding her own against professional barristers. Her proud boast was that she never "lost" a tribunal. This gave her a taste for the law, prompting her to take up legal studies as a mature student.

== University education and death ==
Harrison became a mature student at the University of Oxford (Harris Manchester College), where she was an undergraduate studying for a degree in law. She once described the effects of this mid-life transition, explaining: "I find studying hard, f***ing hard. But it's easier than driving trains for a living. It's hard to get too stressed about exams when you've experienced things like brake failure approaching a red signal, especially when you can see another train crossing the junction in front of you. I still miss the camaraderie of my mates in ASLEF. I miss them terribly. The folk at my college are the closest I've got to that old espirit de corps and they put up with an old bag like me with great stoicism."

After graduation, Harrison had plans to work as a barrister specialising in labour law and human rights. She died in May 2011 before completing her studies. Her funeral was held in the college chapel, with a eulogy given by her tutor Louise Gullifer.

== Legacy ==
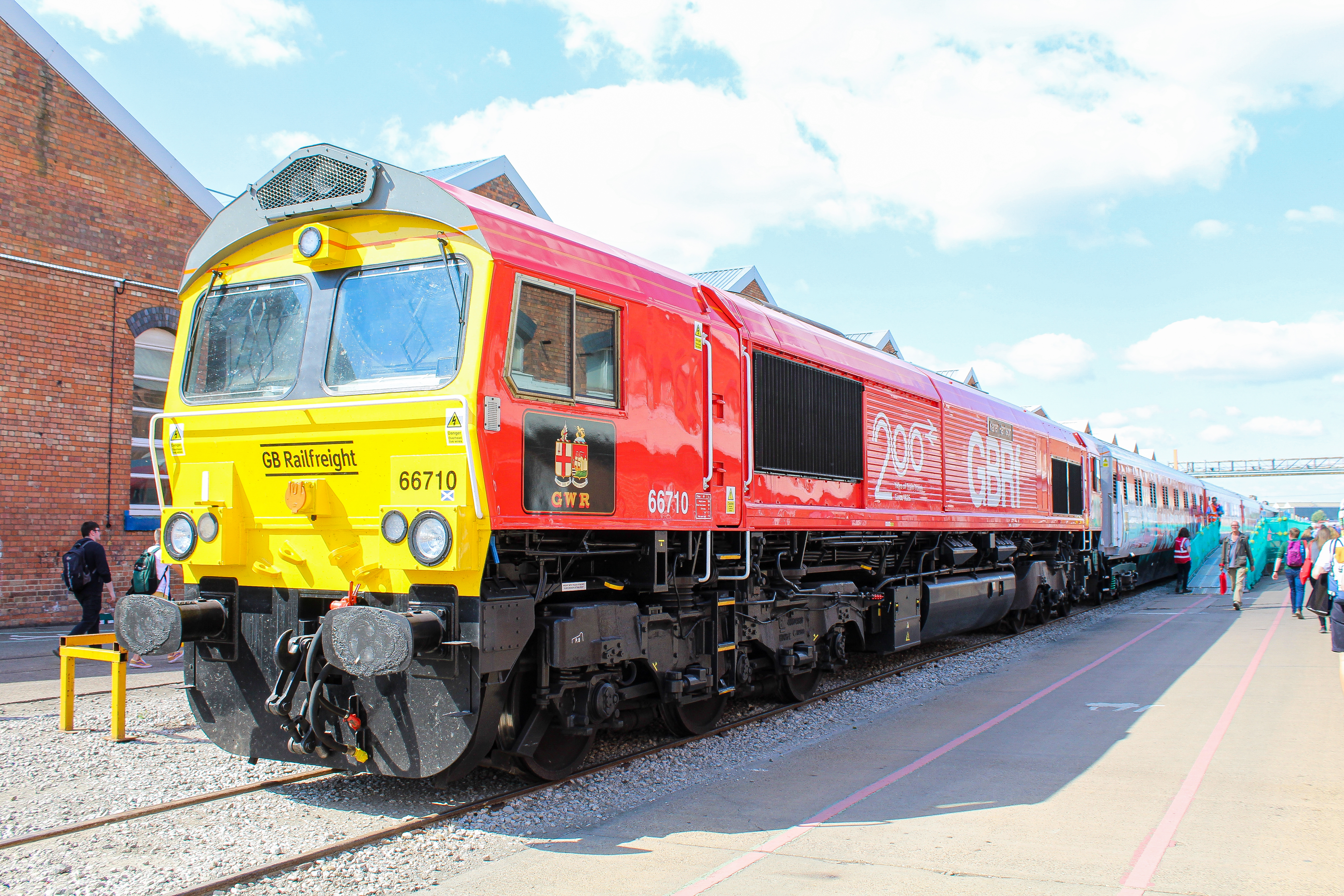
66710 Karen Harrison with the Inspiration train at the Greatest Gathering, Derby in 2025

Harrison is frequently erroneously credited as having been the first woman train driver on British Rail, often by seemingly credible sources including ASLEF, and by herself during interviews, but this is incorrect.

In reality, the first woman to join British Rail's footplate "line of promotion" was Jacquie Abberley in 1978, who commenced as a traction trainee at Cricklewood depot, and then transferred to Mallaig as a "secondman" (also known as driver's assistant).

Harrison was the last of six women to join British Rail as a secondman in 1979, the others being Celine Rocchia at Ripple Lane in April 1979; Sarah Baldwin at Brighton in June 1979; Tina Whybrow at Hither Green in June 1979; Anne Winter at Norwood in August 1979; and Patricia Roche at Kings Cross in October 1979.

In January 2023, a mural was unveiled at Euston station celebrating Harrison. It had been commissioned by Avanti West Coast as part of the operator's campaign for a fifth of new recruits to be women. The accompanying narrative, "She was the first woman to be accepted to train as a driver on Britain's railways", in the press release is wholly incorrect, and takes away the rightful recognitions that belong to others. Harrison's sister said she hoped Harrison would continue to "inspire women to consider train driving".

In August 2025, Class 66 66710 was named Karen Harrison at the Greatest Gathering in Derby.

One of the tunnel boring machines used on HS2 for the Euston Tunnels was named Karen in honour of Harrison.
