= Greatest Gathering =

2025 railway exhibition in Derby, England

The Greatest Gathering
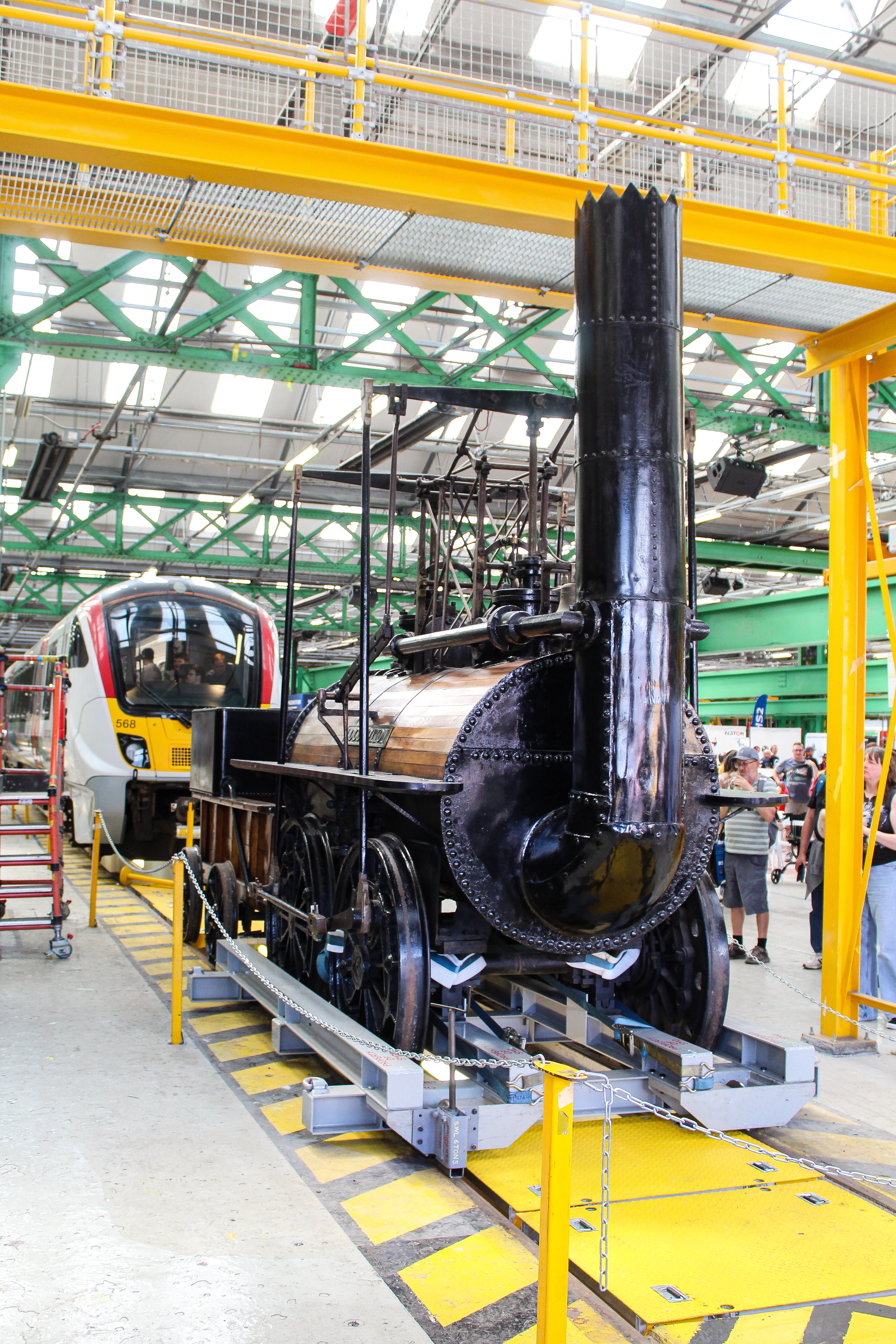
- Locomotion No. 1 at The Greatest Gathering
- Date: 1–3 August 2025
- Venue: Derby Litchurch Lane Works
- Location: Derby, England; 52.9059°N 1.4589°W
- Theme: Rail transport
- Organised by: Alstom
- Website: www.thegreatestgathering.co.uk

The Greatest Gathering was an exhibition of railway vehicles hosted at Alstom's Derby Litchurch Lane Works during 1–3 August 2025. It was the world's largest-ever gathering of historic and modern rolling stock.

The event marked 200 years in the history of rail transport since the construction of Locomotion No. 1 and hauling of the world's first passenger train along the Stockton and Darlington Railway on 27 September 1825.

Minister of State for Transport, Lord Peter Hendy stated that The Greatest Gathering "promises to enter the history books as the largest exhibition of railway equipment ever staged in the UK."

== Event ==
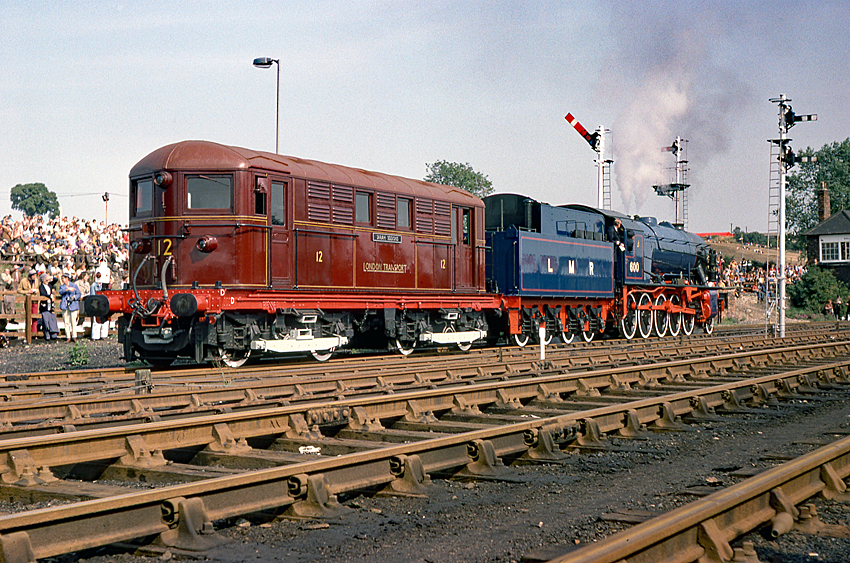
Rail 150: Sarah Siddons hauled by LMR 600 Gordon (Shildon, 1975)

Previous rolling stock exhibitions had been held every fifty years to celebrate the opening of the Stockton and Darlington Railway:

- Rail 50: During 27–29 September 1875, the jubilee celebration exhibition was held at Darlington North Road Engine Works, hosted by the North Eastern Railway, with forty steam locomotives. Opened by George Leeman MP.
- Rail 100: During 1–3 July 1925, the centenary celebration exhibition was held at Darlington Faverdale Wagon Works, hosted by the London and North Eastern Railway, and opened by Prince Albert, Duke of York and Elizabeth, Duchess of York. Rolling stock was provided by the Metropolitan Railway plus each of the Big Four railway companies of the time. Both Locomotion No. 1 and Flying Scotsman participated in the rolling cavalcade.
- Rail 150: During 24–31 August 1975, the sesquicentenary celebration exhibition and cavalcade was held at Shildon railway works, hosted by British Rail. Flying Scotsman participated, along with a brand-new steamable replica of Locomotion No. 1. Metropolitan Railway No. 12 Sarah Siddons was present and hauled by LMR 600 Gordon during the cavalcade. Estimated c. 250,000 spectators.
- Rail 200: During 1–3 August 2025, the bicentenary celebration exhibition was held at Derby Litchurch Lane Works, hosted by Alstom. Later during 26‒28 September 2025, replica Locomotion No. 1 recreated the initial journey; running from the Locomotion Museum at Shildon—with Prince Edward, Duke of Edinburgh in attendance—over the Skerne Bridge, and via Darlington railway station to Stockton railway station.

=== Tickets ===
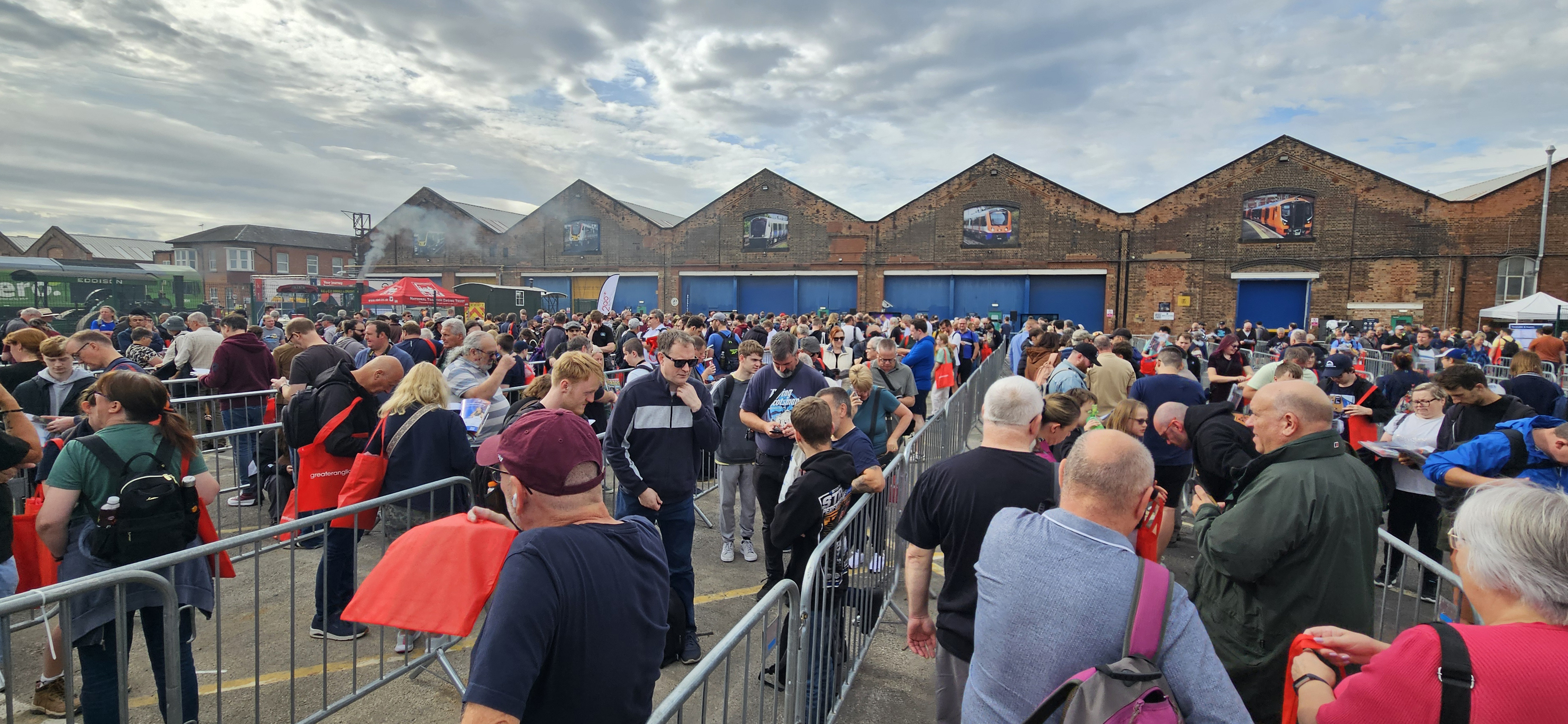
Rail 200: Pre-opening crowd control, queuing inside crowd control barriers

In January 2025, for each of the three days, an initial 10,000 public tickets were released (30,000 tickets total). Daily tickets for a family cost £65, adults £30, and children £15. After the first day, ticket sales were suspended for a week when the website became overloaded.

Profits were to be split between five charities: Alzheimer's Research UK, the Railway Benefit Fund, Railway Children, Railway Mission and the Transport Benevolent Fund.

Public tickets to the main event were sold out. A free fringe event was held at Derby Guildhall Market for people without tickets, organised by Derby City Council and Derwent Valley Line Community Rail Partnership East Midlands Railway sold souvenir platform tickets for railway photography of arriving and departing convoys at Derby railway station.

=== Timeline ===
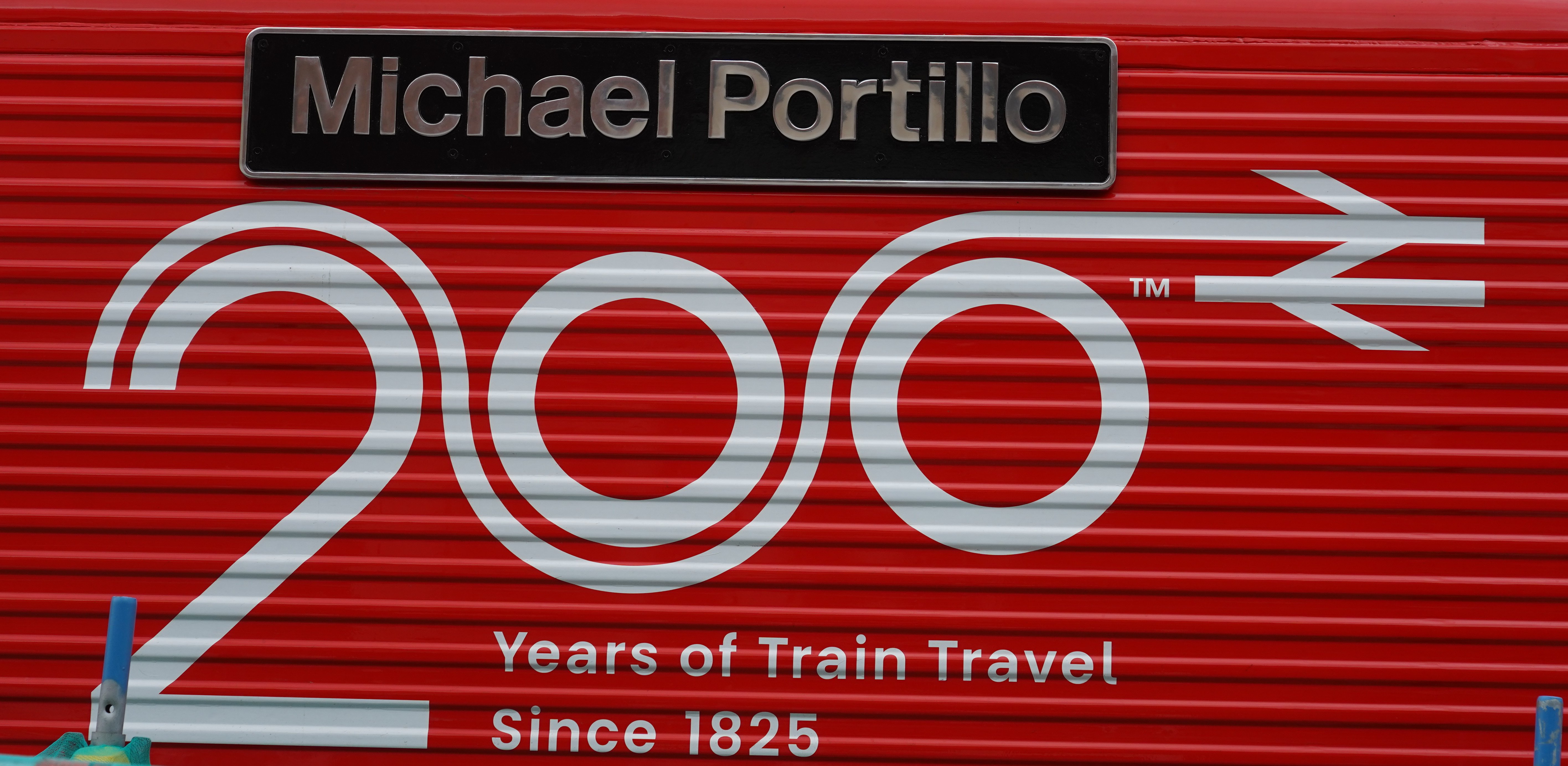
66719 Michael Portillo locomotive nameplate on Railway 200 Exhibition train Class 66 in Derby

An opening VIP event was held on 31 July 2025, with Locomotion No. 1 (oldest) and Greater Anglia's Class 720 (newest) trains as the backdrop. Music performance was by The Grand Central Chorus. Opening speakers included the Member of Parliament for Derby South, Baggy Shanker, the French Ambassador to the UK, Hélène Duchêne, Head Curator of the National Railway Museum Andrew McLean, and Alstom CEO Henri Poupart-Lafarge.

A fleet of vintage buses were used to shuttle visitors between Derby city centre, Derby railway station and the entrance to Derby Litchurch Lane Works.

On 1 August 2025, Jeremy Vine broadcast his BBC Radio 2 afternoon programme live from the site, with a live performance from Bill Ryder-Jones.

=== Locomotive namings ===
Four locomotives were named during the event:

- 66200 The Jeremy Vine Show (1 August)
- 66710 Karen Harrison – unveiled by Michael Portillo
- 66719 Michael Portillo – unveiled by Michael Portillo
- 90018 The Greatest Gathering (2 August)

== Exhibits ==
The original plan had been for 30 to 50 exhibits and 5,000 visitors. During 1–3 August 2025 there were 40,000 visitors, and over 140 railway vehicles and railway locomotives on display covering two centuries.

=== Steam locomotives ===
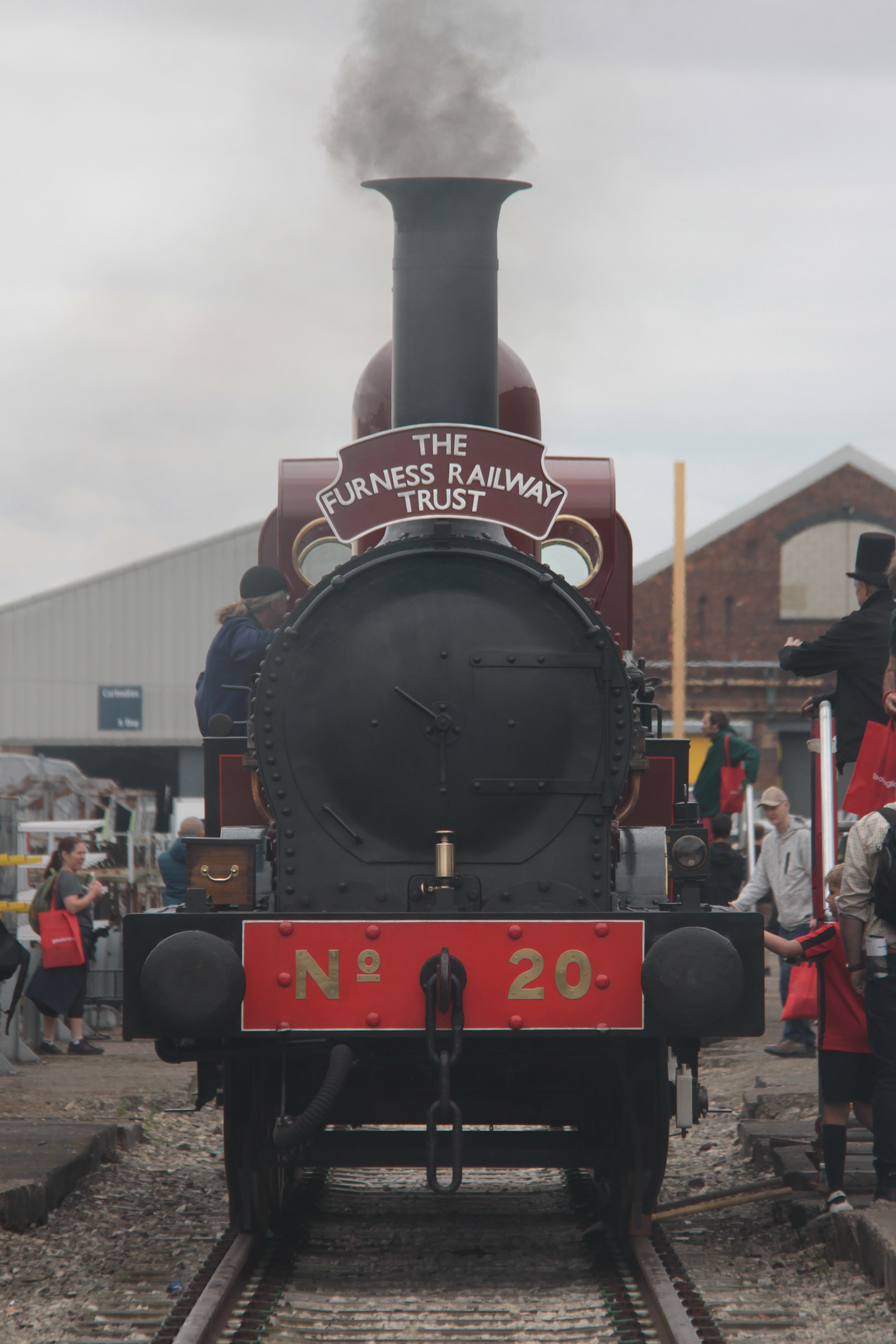
Furness Railway No. 20 (1863) ‒ the oldest non-replica operating locomotive

- Locomotion No. 1 – National Railway Museum
- Furness Railway No. 20 (built 1863) – Furness Railway Trust
- GWR 4900 Class 4930 Hagley Hall – Severn Valley Railway, built 1929
- GWR 6000 Class 6023 King Edward II - Didcot Railway Centre
- Midland Railway 1000 Compound, 1000 Class (built 1902) by Samuel Waite Johnson – National Railway Museum
- LNWR Webb Coal Tank no. 1054
- LNER Peppercorn Class A1 60163 Tornado (built 2008)
- LNER Peppercorn Class A2 60532 Blue Peter
- LNER Class A3 4472 Flying Scotsman (no. 60103)
- LNER Class A4 4498 Sir Nigel Gresley (no. 60007)
- LMS Jubilee Class 5596 Bahamas (BR no. 45596) (built 1934)
- LMS Jubilee Class 5699 Galatea, painted as 45627 Sierra Leone
- LMS Royal Scot Class no. 6115 Scots Guardsman (BR no. 46115)
- LMS Princess Royal Class 6203 Princess Margaret Rose (no. 46203)
- LMS Stanier Class 5 4-6-0 4932, painted 44932 Black 5
- LMS Stanier Mogul 13268 – Severn Valley Railway
- SR Merchant Navy Class 35018 British India Line ‒ West Coast Railways
- SR Merchant Navy Class 35028 Clan Line, with Golden Arrow emblems – Merchant Navy Locomotive Preservation Society
- BR Standard Class 3 2-6-2T no. 82045 (new-build)
- BR Standard Class 5 no. 73129
- BR Standard Class 9F no. 92214 ‒ Great Central Railway

==== Flying Scotsman ====
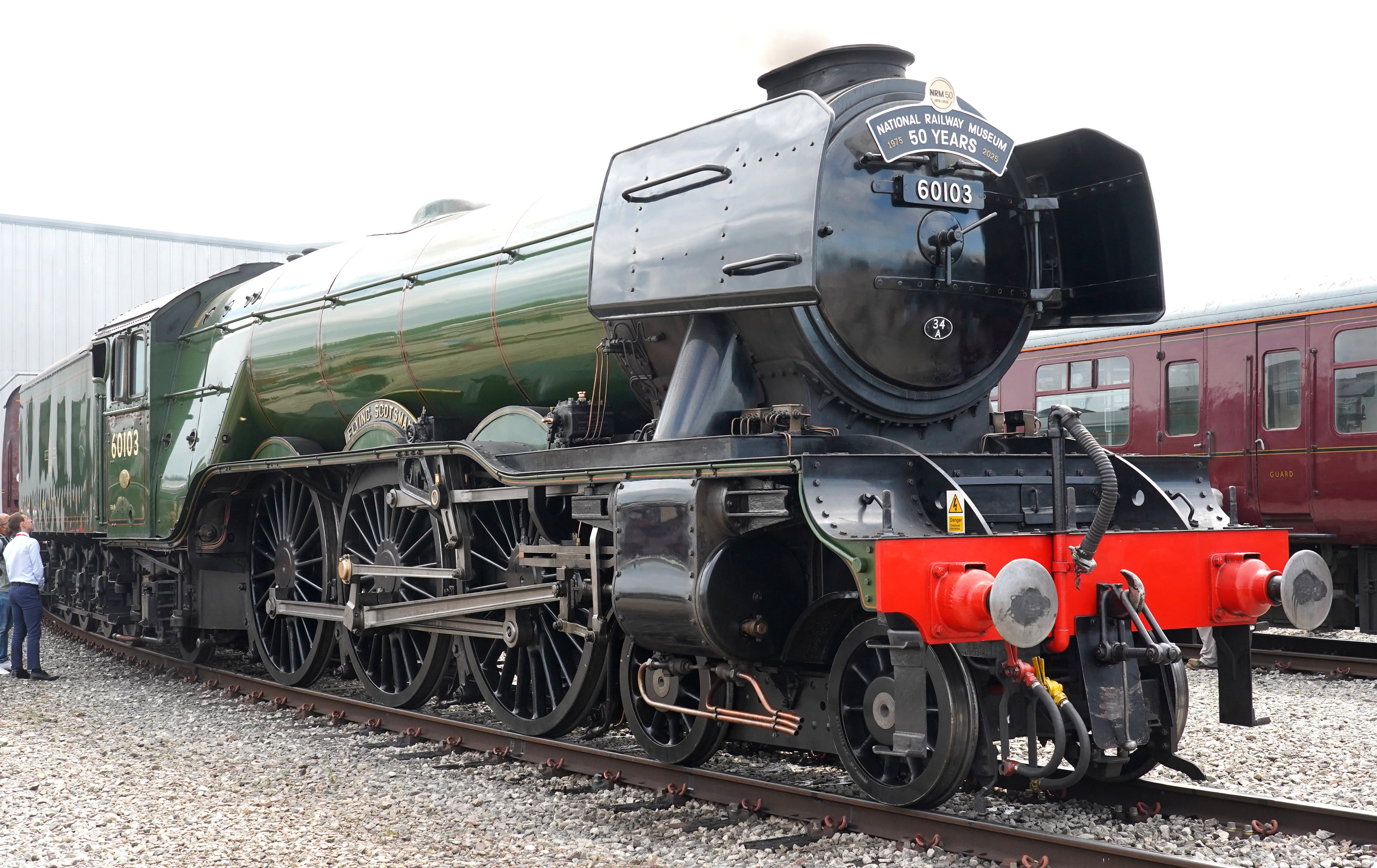
Flying Scotsman after hauling Belmond British Pullman, with "National Railway Museum 50 years" headboard

In June 2025, the director of the National Railway Museum, Craig Bentley, confirmed that LNER A3 Flying Scotsman would appear with other rolling stock items in the UK National Collection at the Greatest Gathering—a planned "huge" rail event and "the world's largest gathering of historic and modern railway vehicles." The locomotive would travel to Derby Litchurch Lane Works for the three days in August 2025, where the "iconic" locomotive was planned to "take centre stage." In the middle of the event on Saturday 2 August 2025, Flying Scotsman briefly left Derby Litchurch Lane Works to haul the Belmond British Pullman special charter train between Wellingborough and Derby.

=== Diesel and electric locomotives ===
==== Diesel locomotives ====
Class 08 shunters

- Class 08:
  - 08308 (08308e) (battery-electric conversion)
  - 08635 (now H3802) (hydrogen-electric conversion)
  - 08721 Ken Davies (diesel-electric) ‒ Alstom; named after a former Old Dalby Test Track manager and used for shunting during the Greatest Gathering setup
  - 13000
- Class 11 no. 12099 – Severn Valley Railway
- Class 17 no. D8598 – Severn Valley Railway
- Class 23 no. D5910 Baby Deltic – Barrow Hill Engine Shed
- Class 26 no. 26007 – Barrow Hill Engine Shed
- Class 27 no. 27056 – Great Central Railway
- Class 31 no. 31108 – Midland Railway - Butterley
- Class 33 no. 33012 Lt Jenny Lewis RN ‒ Swanage Railway and 71A Locomotive Group
- Class 35 no. D7076 – East Lancashire Railway
- Class 37:
  - D6700 – Great Central Railway and National Railway Museum
  - 37099 (Saturday onwards)
  - 37401 Mary Queen of Scots – Locomotive Services Limited
  - 37418 – Network Rail and Loram UK
  - 37501 Teesside Steelmaster – Rail Operations Group
  - 37508 – Loram UK
  - 37516 Loch Laidon – West Coast Railways
  - 37800
  - 3790 – Europhoenix
- Class 40:
  - D213 (40013) Andania
  - 40106 Atlantic Conveyor, with The Caledonian emblems ‒ Class 40 Preservation Society and Severn Valley Railway
- Class 42 no. D821 Greyhound
- Class 43 HST power car:
  - 43004 Caerphilly Castle – Great Western Railway
  - 43060, re-numbered as 43200 with Railway 200 livery ‒ 125 Group
  - 43159 Rio Warrior, the World's fastest diesel – 125 Group
  - 43198 Driver Brian Cooper 15 June 1947 - 5 October 1999 | Driver Stan Martin 25 June 1950 - 6 November 2004. ‒ Great Western Railway
  - 43468 – RailAdventure
  - 43484 – RailAdventure
- Class 44:
  - D4 Great Gable – Midland Railway - Butterley
  - D8 Penyghent – Peak Rail
- Class 45:
  - 45108 – Midland Railway - Butterley
  - 45118 The Royal Artilleryman
- Class 46 no. 46045 – Peak Rail
- Class 47:
  - 47715 – Rail Engineering Solutions and Chinnor and Princes Risborough Railway; features Virgin CrossCountry Livery.
  - 47739 – GB Railfreight
- Class 50 "Hoovers":
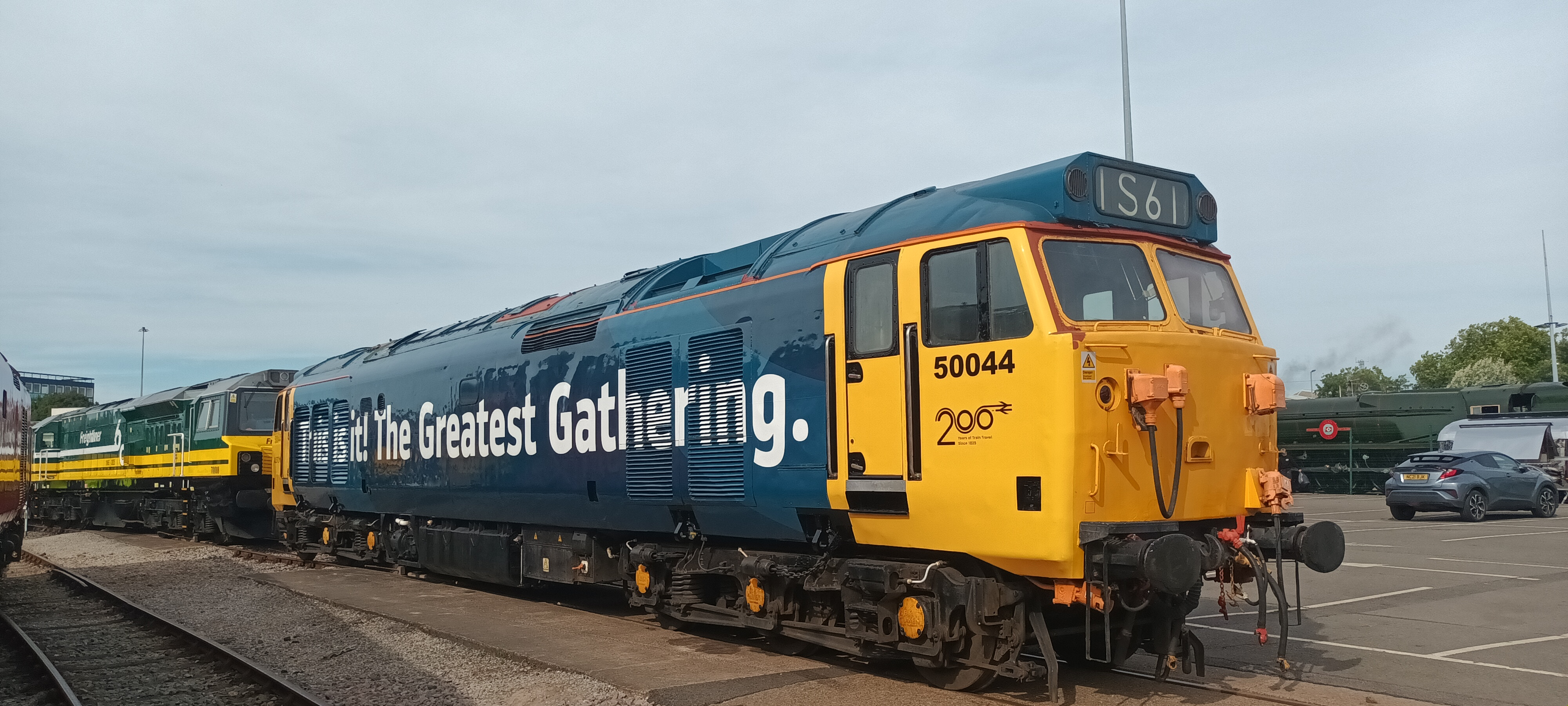
  Class 50, no. 50044 painted with "This is it! The Greatest Gathering"
  - 50007 Hercules – Class 50 Alliance
  - 50033 Glorious – Class 50 Alliance
  - 50035 Ark Royal ‒ Class 50 Alliance and Severn Valley Railway; features special 'So. Many. Trains.' wrap
  - 50044 Exeter – Class 50 Alliance; features special 'This is it! The Greatest Gathering' wrap
  - 50049 Defiance – Class 50 Alliance
- Class 52 No. D1015 Western Champion – Diesel Traction Group
- Class 55 "Deltic":
  - 55009 Alycidon – Deltic Preservation Society
  - D9015 (BR no. 55015) Tulyar – Deltic Preservation Society
  - 55019 Royal Highland Fusilier ‒ Deltic Preservation Society
  - 55022 Royal Scots Grey – Locomotive Services Limited
- Class 57:
  - 57003 Inter City Railway Society 50th Anniversary 1973‒2023 – Locomotive Services Limited
  - 57307 Lady Penelope – Direct Rail Services
  - 57314 Conwy Castle – West Coast Railways
  - 57604 Pendennis Castle – Great Western Railway
- Class 58 no. 58023 Leicester Depot
- Class 59 no. 59201 Westbury PSB 1984-2024 – Freightliner
- Class 66:
  - 66004 – DB Cargo UK
  - 66200 The Jeremy Vine Show – DB Cargo UK (Named during the weekend)
  - 66301 – GB Railfreight and Drax Group
  - 66501 Spirit Of 65 Celebrating 60 Years of Freightliner – Freightliner
  - 66710 Karen Harrison – GB Railfreight (Named during the weekend)
  - 66719 Michael Portillo – GB Railfreight (Named during the weekend)
- Class 67 no. 67005 King's Messenger – British Royal Train
- Class 68 no. 68034 Rail Riders 2020v Direct Rail Services
- Class 69 no. 69016 British Transport Police, painted as "61016"
- Class 70 no. 70008 – Freightliner
- Rolls-Royce Sentinel 0-4-0DH 10077 – Plym Valley Railway
- Ruston & Hornsby no. 294266 Sir William McAlpine – Lawrie Rose
- LNER Class Y11 no. 15097 Ubique – Chasewater Railway
- Clayton Equipment Company CD40 B4618/4 shunter – Rail Support Services

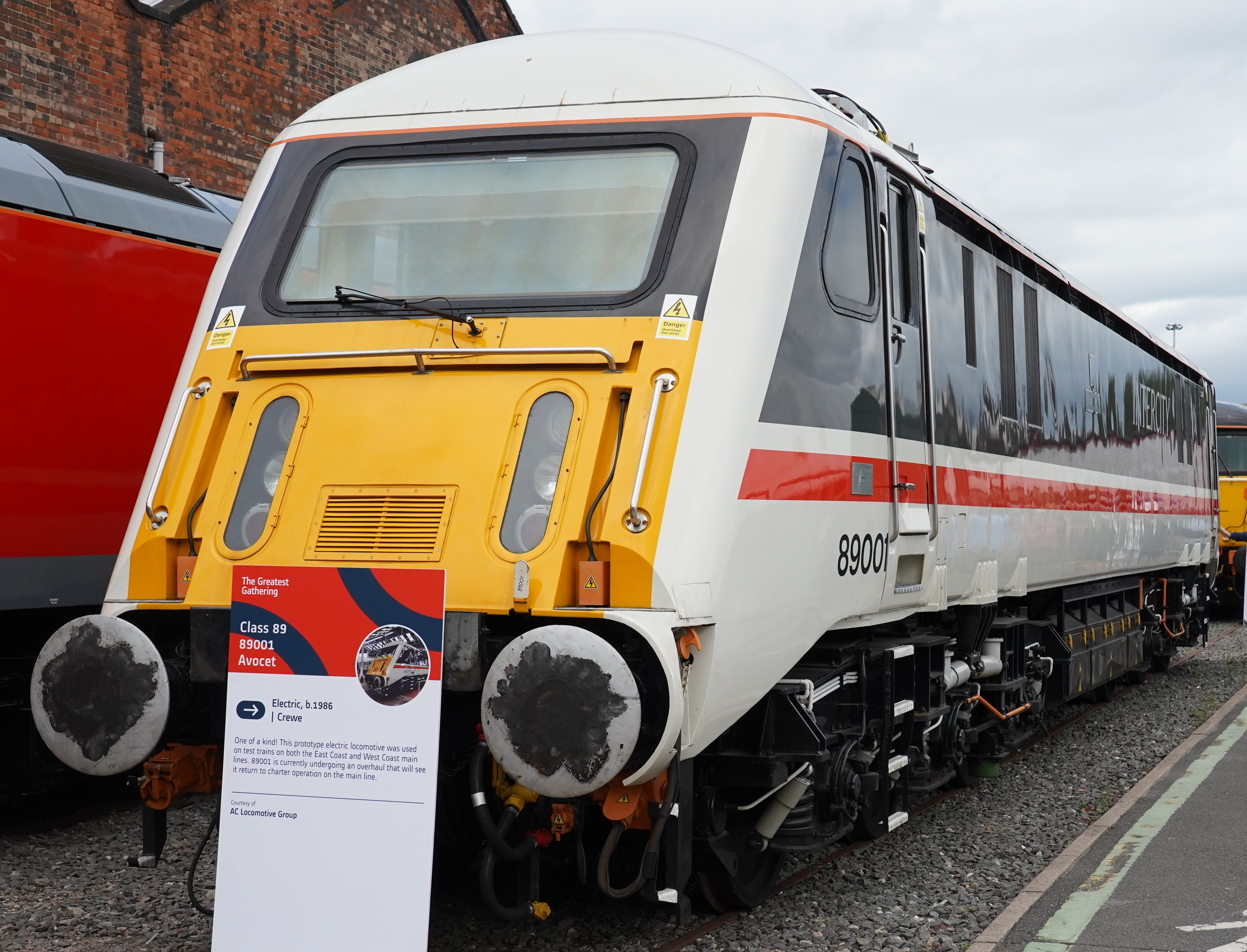
One of a kind 89001 Avocet with an 'About The Exhibit' information panel

==== Electric locomotives ====
- Metropolitan Railway No. 12 Sarah Siddons – London Transport Museum
- Class 73:
  - 73119 Paul Taylor – GB Railfreight
  - 73136 ‒ GB Railfreight
- Class 86:
  - 86101 Sir William A Stanier FRS – Locomotive Services Limited
  - 86401 Mons Meg – West Coast Railways
- Class 87 no. 87002 Royal Sovereign – Locomotive Services Limited
- Class 88 no. 88010 Aurora – Direct Rail Services
- Class 89 no. 89001 Avocet – Locomotive Services Limited
- Class 90 no. 90018 The Greatest Gathering (named during the weekend) – Freightliner
- Class 91:
  - 91105 National Railway Museum 50 Years 1975-2025 – London North Eastern Railway
  - 91110 Battle of Britain Memorial Flight – London North Eastern Railway
  - 91117 Project Electra – Europhoenix
- Class 92 no. 92011 Handel – DB Cargo UK
- Class 93:
  - 93003 ‒ Rail Operations Group
  - 93009 (Used for Cab Rides) – Rail Operations Group
- Class 99 no. 99001 – GB Railfreight
- Class 373 spare power car no. 3999 – Eurostar International Limited

=== Multiple units ===
High-speed trains lined up side-by-side

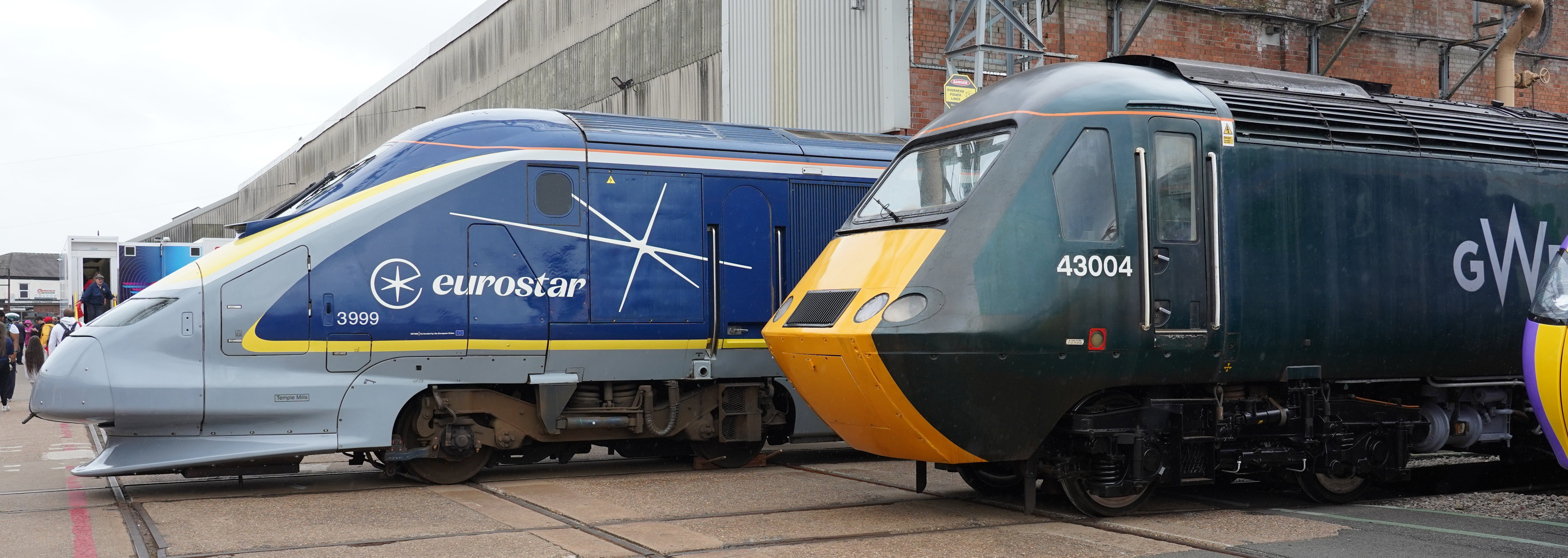
Eurostar no. 3999 and Class 43 no. 43004 power cars

==== Diesel multiple units ====
- Derby Lightweight no. 79900 Iris (formerly RDB 975010 Test Coach Iris)
- Class 108 DMU Nos. 51941 + 52064 – DMU Group (West Midlands) & Severn Valley Railway
- Class 142 no. 142013 – Midland Railway – Butterley
- Class 150 no. 150231 – Watercress Line
- Class 153 no. 153317

==== Electric multiple units ====
- Class 313 no. 313201 – Peter Spokes / 400 Series Preservation Group
- Class 323 no. 323221 – Porterbrook
- Class 331 no. 331013 – Northern Trains
- Class 345 no. 345055 Every Story Matters – Elizabeth line; running along on-site railway test track
- Class 350 no. 350106 – London Northwestern Railway
- Class 390 Pendolino no. 390119 Progress – Avanti West Coast, hauled by 57307 Lady Penelope
- Class 398 tram-train – South Wales Metro,
- Class 423 (4VEP) no. 423417 Gordon Pettitt – Southern Electric Traction Group and Bluebell Railway
- Class 455 no. 455868 – South Western Railway
- Class 465 no. 465908 Chris Green OBE – Southeastern
- Class 507 Merseyrail no. 507001 – Class 507 Preservation Society under restoration by apprentices
- Class 720 no. 720568 Greater Anglia Flyer – Greater Anglia
- Class 730 no. 730202 – London Northwestern Railway

==== Multi-mode multiple units ====
- Class 755 hybrid train, backdrop for opening event – Greater Anglia
- Class 799 HydroFLEX – Porterbrook

=== Others ===
- Inspiration, the Railway 200 Exhibition Train – hauled by GB Railfreight Class 66 710 Karen Harrison and 66 719 Michael Portillo locomotives.
- 4 car 4TC set – London Transport Museum
- 4 car Mark 3 Coaches built at Derby Litchurch Lane Works and hauled by 125 Group HST power cars 43060 + 43159 ‒ 125 Group
- 975025 Caroline inspection saloon ‒ Network Rail and Loram UK
- IIA-D Biomass Hopper – Drax Group
- RGX Rail Grinder – Network Rail and Loram UK
- Bombardier Incentro AT6/5 tram no. 207 Mavis Worthington ‒ Nottingham Express Transit

==== Narrow gauge ====
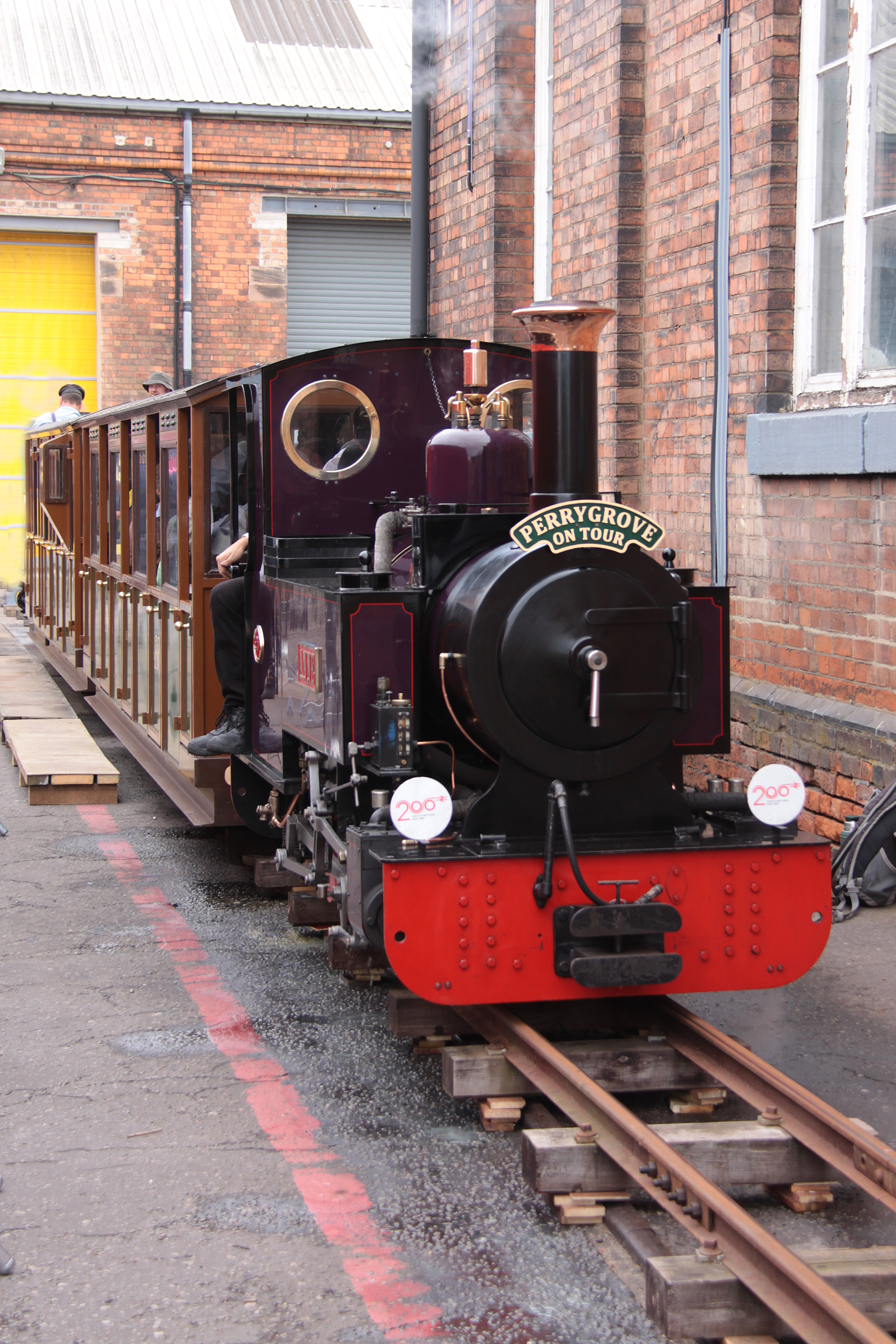
Anne and Katie operating on the temporary 15 in (381 mm) track

Special 2 ft (610 mm) tracks were built for the narrow gauge steam locomotives:

- Festiniog Railway 0-4-0TT Prince (built 1863) – Festiniog Railway
- Trangkil No. 4 (built 1971) – Statfold Barn Railway

Special 15 in (381 mm) tracks were built for the minimum-gauge railway locomotives:

- Katie (built 1896) ‒ Arthur Heywood's locomotive – Ravenglass and Eskdale Railway
- Anne (built 2004) by Exmoor Steam Railway for Longleat Safari and Adventure Park – Perrygrove Railway

Special 10 1/4 in (260 mm) tracks were built for giving rides behind IMechE Railway Challenge locomotives from the University of Derby and University of Sheffield—supported by the Institution of Mechanical Engineers with passenger carriages from Stapleford Miniature Railway:

- Spirit of Sandringham (built 2024) – University of Sheffield
- The Derby Express (built 2025) – University of Derby & Alstom

==== Model railway village ====
- Deadmans Lane ‒ Mick Bryan
- Harefield Road tube station, modelling London Underground ‒ Eric French
- Milton Keynes Central railway station ‒ Pete Waterman
- Twelve Trees Junction – Key Model World
- Welby Lane RTC, modelling the former Mickleover test track, and Old Dalby Test Track – Mark Pearson

==== Non-rail based exhibits ====
- Aerospatiale AS355F2 Ecureuil II Flight No. G-NLSE – Network Rail and PDG Aviation Services
- Aveling & Porter steam roller no. 10237 (built 1922)
- Aveling & Porter traction engine no. 11486 Morning Star (built 1926)
- Babcock & Wilcox steam roller no. 95/4009 Toby (built 1926)
- Class 253 no. 253005 (power car no. 43011) (cab-only; pre-1976 cab re-fitted out c. 1983)
- Class 442 no. 442405 (cab only)
- Class 895 future High Speed 2 rolling-stock mockup
- Dovetail Games – Train Sim World
- Thomas the Tank Engine: An Unlikely Fandom Premiere

== Aftermath ==
A total of 800 shunting movements were required within Litchurch Lane to move all the rolling stock into their positions.

A 1959 painting DMU at Derby Carriage and Wagon Works by Terence Cuneo resurfaced during preparation of the site for the Greatest Gathering. The painting shows a British Rail Class 108 on the Litchurch Lane traverser; it was subsequently loaned to Derby Museum of Making for display. During the 2025-event, a en plein air (in open air) painting was created by Tim O'Brien and subsequently unveiled as the official artwork.

In September 2025, the second episode of Michael Portillo's 200 Years of the Railways—partially filmed at The Greatest Gathering in Derby—was broadcast on BBC Two.

In April 2026 the first episode of Francis Bourgeois and Chris Harris' We Saved a Train called "Celebrating 200 Years of Steam and Diesel"—partially filmed at The Greatest Gathering in Derby—was broadcast on Quest and Discovery+ in the United Kingdom.

Over £100,000 was raised and donated for the five nominated charities.
