= 975025 Caroline =

British railway carriage

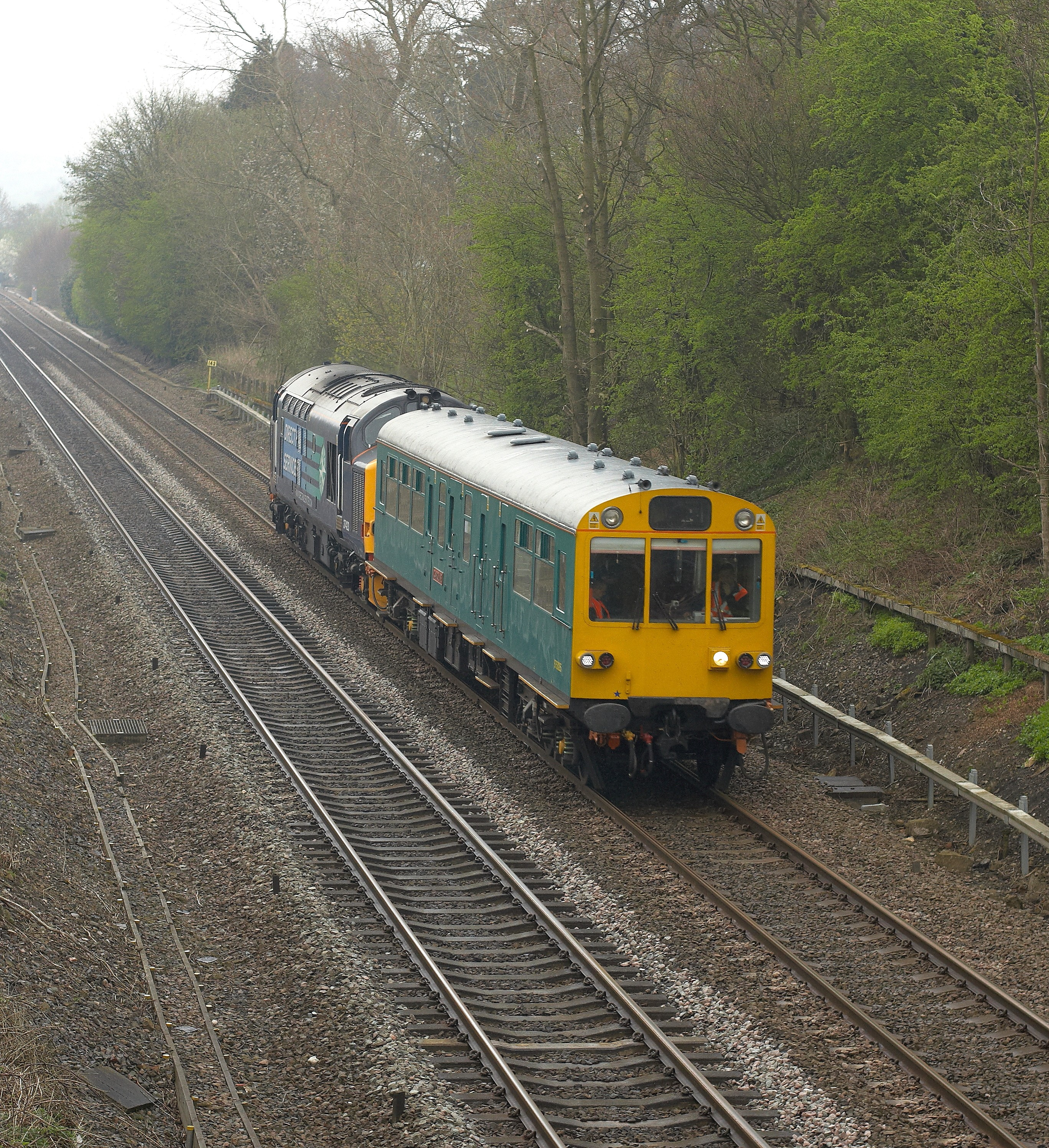
975025 Caroline being propelled by a Direct Rail Services (formerly British Rail) Class 37 locomotive (37423) coupled behind it

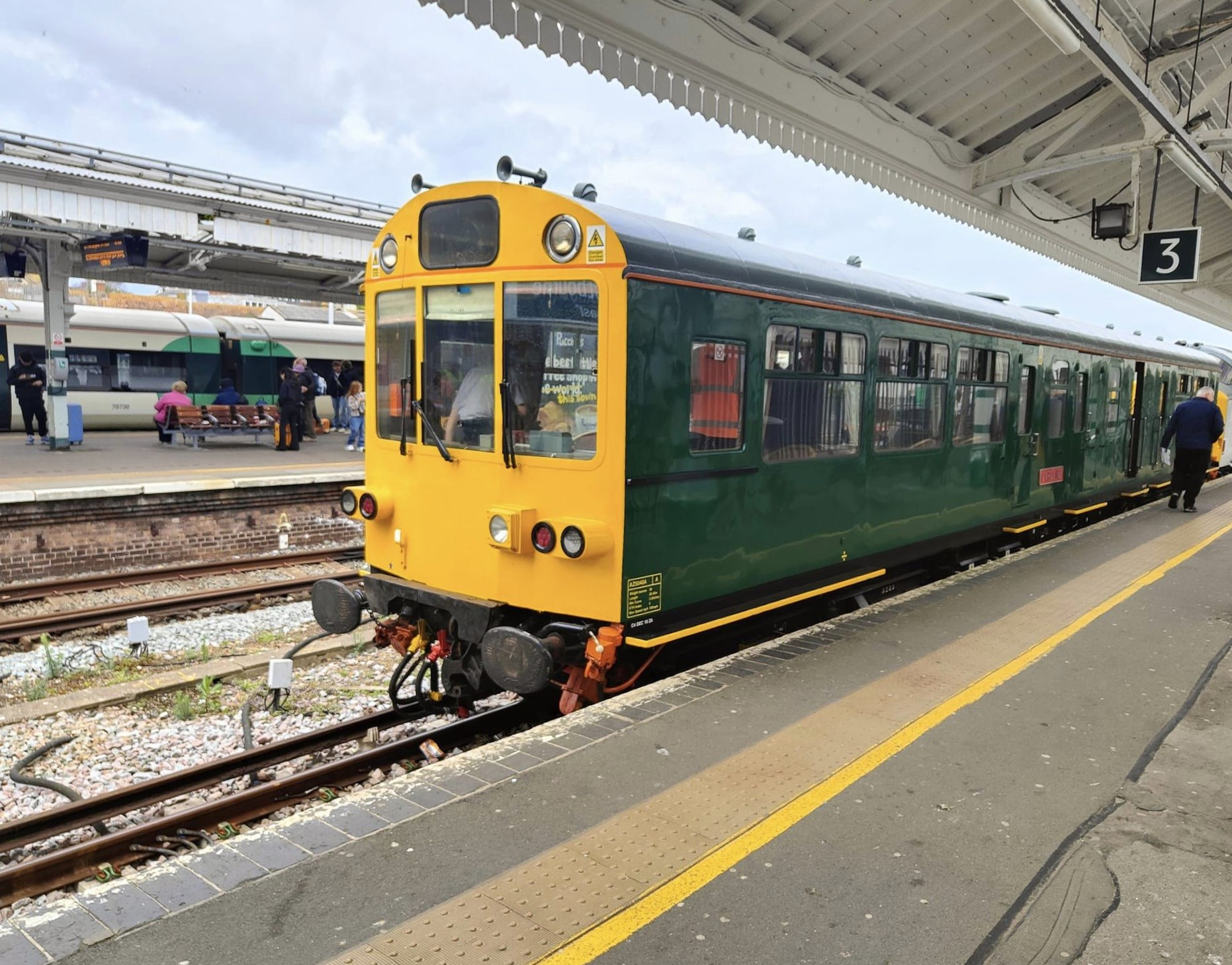
975025 'Caroline' at Eastbourne Station

975025 Caroline, originally the Southern Region General Manager's Saloon, is an inspection saloon used for rail inspection duties on the railway network in Great Britain, and which has historically been used as a VIP excursion train on several occasions. The saloon carriage is notable for being used as the British Royal Train between London Waterloo and Romsey for the first part of the honeymoon trip following the wedding of Prince Charles and Lady Diana Spencer on 29 July 1981. One year later on 28 May 1982, Caroline was the transport for Pope John Paul II's visit to the United Kingdom between Gatwick Airport and London Victoria station.

Additionally, Caroline formed the first standard gauge passenger service into the Channel Tunnel on 22 October 1992, leaving from Waterloo International railway station and propelled by 73112 University of Kent into the tunnel. The passengers on the journey were those from the Parliamentary All-Party Channel Tunnel Group. The train left Waterloo International at 10:10, and ran to Clapham Junction where it reversed and ran to Orpington and on to Ashford International for access to Dollands Moor Freight Yard. The Channel Tunnel was entered at 13:00. On 18 March 1996, Caroline and 33109 travelled to Chesham tube station on the London Underground network as part of suitability investigations for the Crossrail project.

== History ==
The vehicle was originally built in 1958 at Eastleigh Works as type AZA trailer restaurant buffet car (TRB) S60755, for a British Rail Class 203 diesel-electric multiple-unit No. 1036, until withdrawal during 1964. These "Hastings Units" had a narrow body profile for working through tunnels on the Hastings Line, and is the reason for the continued narrow width of Caroline.

== Modern use ==
As of 2012, the saloon has had push–pull train controls similar to a Driving Van Trailer for a period of several decades, to allow it to remotely control an accompanying locomotive. It was previously the Southern Region General Manager's Saloon, having been converted at Stewarts Lane Depot for that purpose in 1969 and re-numbered as 975025 in 1978. For this, Caroline was fitted with Southern Region-style multiple working controls allowing usage with British Rail Class 33 and 73 diesel locomotives, and other Class 400 EMUs. By 1991 it could be seen in Network SouthEast livery.

In 1999, Caroline was overhauled by Fragonset Railways at the Railway Technical Centre in Derby and transferred to Network Rail, subsequently being frequently operated by Victa Westlink Rail and later Loram. Modifications in the late 2000s converted Caroline to require an electric train heating (ETH) supply and use the "blue star" multiple working system. After this conversion it was normally propelled by a Class 37 diesel locomotive.

== Preservation and heritage ==
On 12 December 2008, Caroline was "designated for preservation" following a vote by the Railway Heritage Committee, after earlier consideration by the Artefacts Sub-committee concluded that the case for designation was 'marginal'.

During 1‒3 August 2025 Caroline was on display for the Greatest Gathering at Derby Litchurch Lane Works.
