= Hastings Unit =

The Hastings Units were three classes of diesel-electric multiple unit which were built by BR(S) in the late 1950s, and operated until the mid-1980s.

- British Rail Class 201 (6S)
- British Rail Class 202 (6L)
- British Rail Class 203 (6B)
  - 975025 Caroline ex-6B Buffet car later used as an inspection saloon
