= Metropolitan Railway electric locomotives =

Class of 20 British electric locomotives

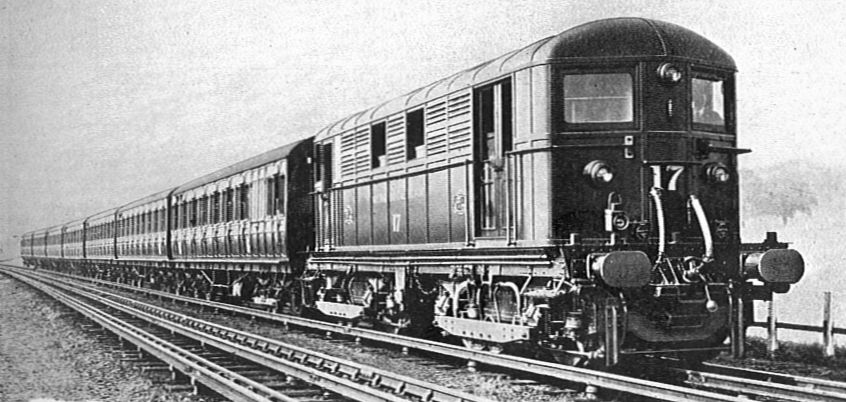
Metropolitan-Vickers electric locomotive and train on the Metropolitan Railway in the 1920s

Metropolitan Railway electric locomotives were used on London's Metropolitan Railway with conventional carriage stock. On the outer suburban routes an electric locomotive was used at the Baker Street end that was exchanged for a steam locomotive en route (latterly at Rickmansworth).

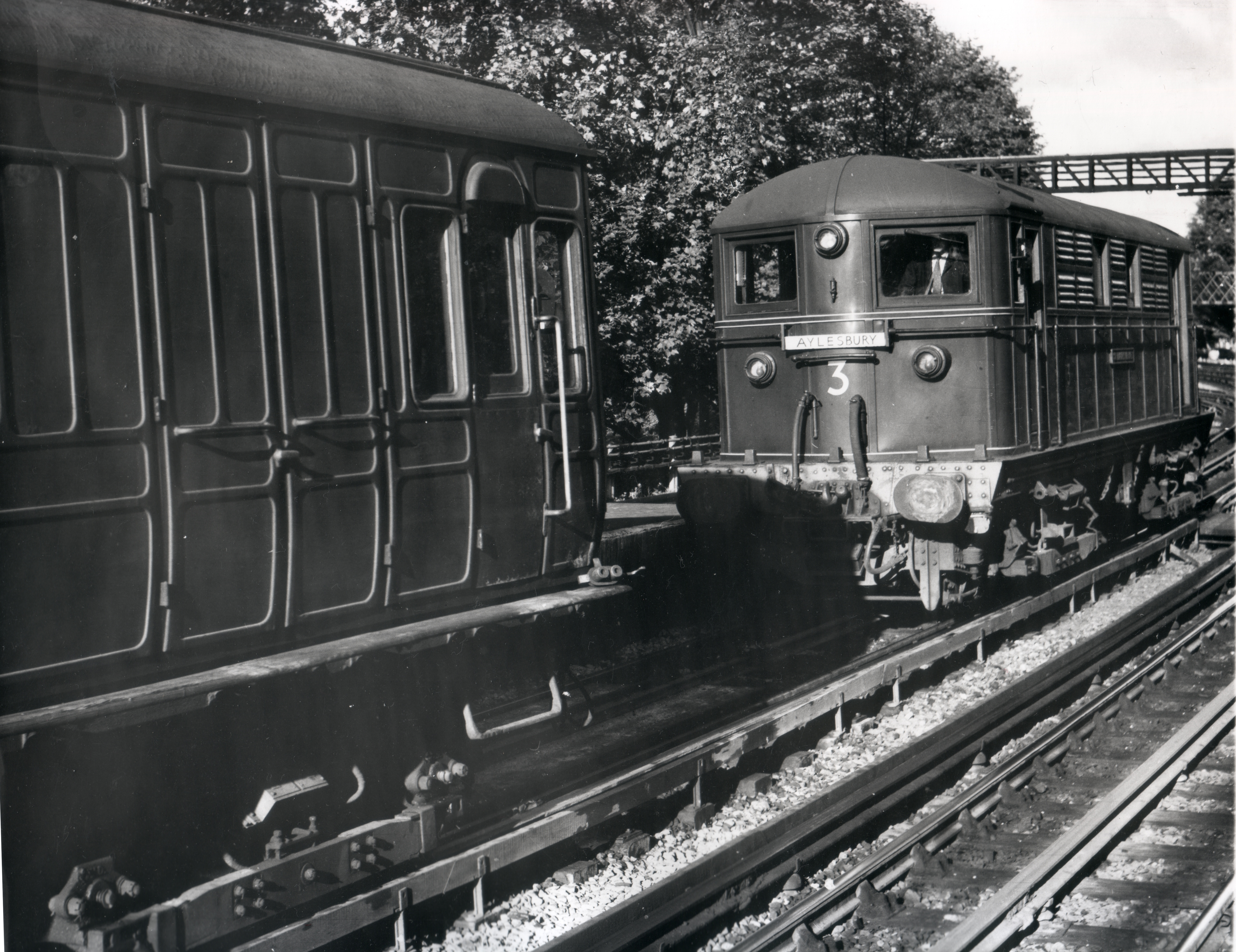
Locomotive change at Rickmansworth, Metropolitan Line, August 1960

The first ten had a central cab and were known as camel-backs, and these entered service in 1906. A year later another ten units with a box design and a driving position at each end arrived. These were replaced by more powerful units in the early 1920s.

The locomotives were withdrawn from passenger service in 1962 after electrification reached Amersham and the A Stock electric multiple units entered service. One locomotive, No. 5 John Hampden, is preserved as a static display at London Transport Museum, and another, No. 12 Sarah Siddons, has been used for heritage events.

== Westinghouse ==
The Metropolitan Railway ordered electric locomotives from British Westinghouse and made by Metropolitan Amalgamated. The first ten were built with Westinghouse electrical control equipment and entered service in 1906. These 'camel-back' bogie locomotives featured a central cab, weighed 50 long tons (51 t), were 35 feet 9 inches (10.90 m) long over the buffers and had four 215 hp (160 kW) traction motors. Initially there was only one position for the driver which proved troublesome, and a second master controller was soon added.

== British Thompson Houston ==
The second ten, also constructed by Metropolitan Amalgamated, were built to a box car design with British Thompson Houston control equipment. These locomotives weighed 47 tons, and were 33 feet 6 inches (10.21 m) long over buffers and entered service in 1907. The control equipment was replaced with the Westinghouse type in 1919.

== Metropolitan-Vickers ==
Metropolitan Railway "Metro-Vick"
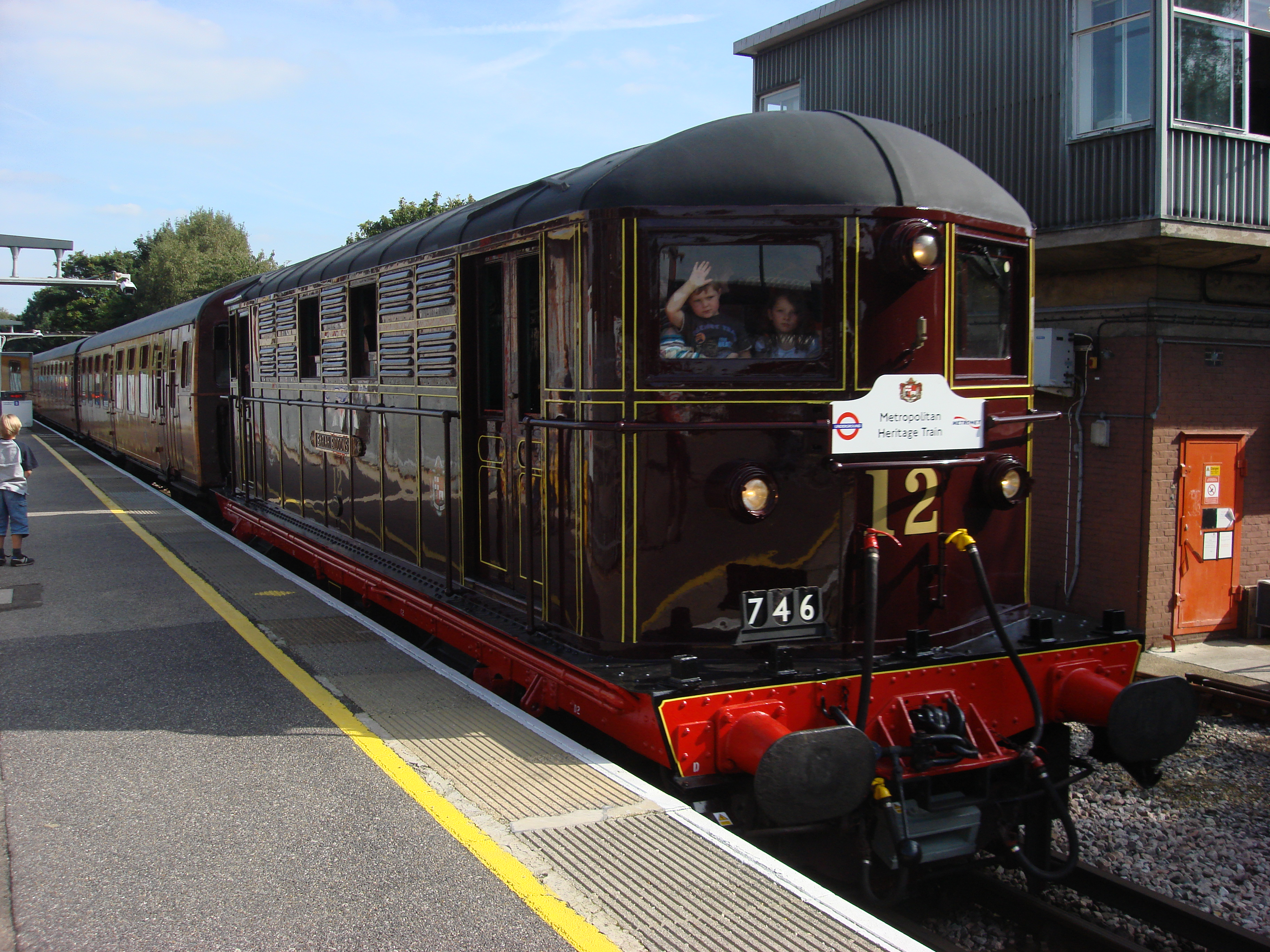
- No. 12 Sarah Siddons at Amersham in 2008
Type and origin
- Power type: Electric
- Builder: Metropolitan-Vickers
- Build date: 1922-23
- Total produced: 20
Specifications
- Configuration
  - Whyte: Bo-Bo
- Gauge: 1,435 mm (4 ft 8 1/2 in) standard gauge
- Loco weight: 62.4 tonnes (61.4 long tons; 68.8 short tons)
- Electric system/s: 600 V DC
- Current pickup: Fourth rail
- Traction motors: 4× 300 hp nose-hung
- MU working: Within class
Performance figures
- Maximum speed: 65 mph (105 km/h)
- Power output: 1,200 hp (890 kW)
Career
- Operators: Metropolitan Railway; London Underground Metropolitan line
- Numbers: 1-20
- Retired: 1943, 1948, 1951, 1962
- Preserved: 2

In the early 1920s, the Metropolitan placed an order with Metropolitan-Vickers of Barrow-in-Furness for rebuilding the twenty electric locomotives. When work started on the first locomotive, it was found to be impractical and uneconomical and the order was changed to building completely new locomotives using some equipment recovered from the originals. The new locomotives were built in 1922-1923 and weighing 61½ tons, they had four 300 hp (220 kW) motors, giving a one-hour rating of 1,200 hp (890 kW) and a top speed of 65 mph (105 km/h).

In 1925, No. 15 was exhibited on the Metropolitan Railway's stand at the British Empire Exhibition; the panelling was removed from one side, so that the equipment inside could be viewed. The locomotives were all named, the first nameplates being fitted on 18 March 1927. Nineteen of the names chosen were of people, real or fictitious, who had a connection with the area served by the Metropolitan; the exception was No. 15, the exhibition locomotive of 1925, which became Wembley 1924. Nameplates were removed during World War II.

In 1953 the fifteen remaining locomotives were overhauled and the traction control equipment replaced by BTH equipment from District line cars. Nameplates were refitted. After electrification to Amersham was completed in 1961 the locomotives were withdrawn from passenger service, although three were kept as shunters.

One locomotive, No. 5 John Hampden, is preserved as a static display at London Transport Museum and another, No. 12 Sarah Siddons, has been used for heritage events, most recently in January 2019 running in conjunction with Metropolitan Railway Locomotive No. 1 on steam excursions to mark the 150th anniversary of the opening of the District Railway.

During 1‒3 August 2025 Sarah Siddons was on display for the Greatest Gathering held at Derby Litchurch Lane Works.

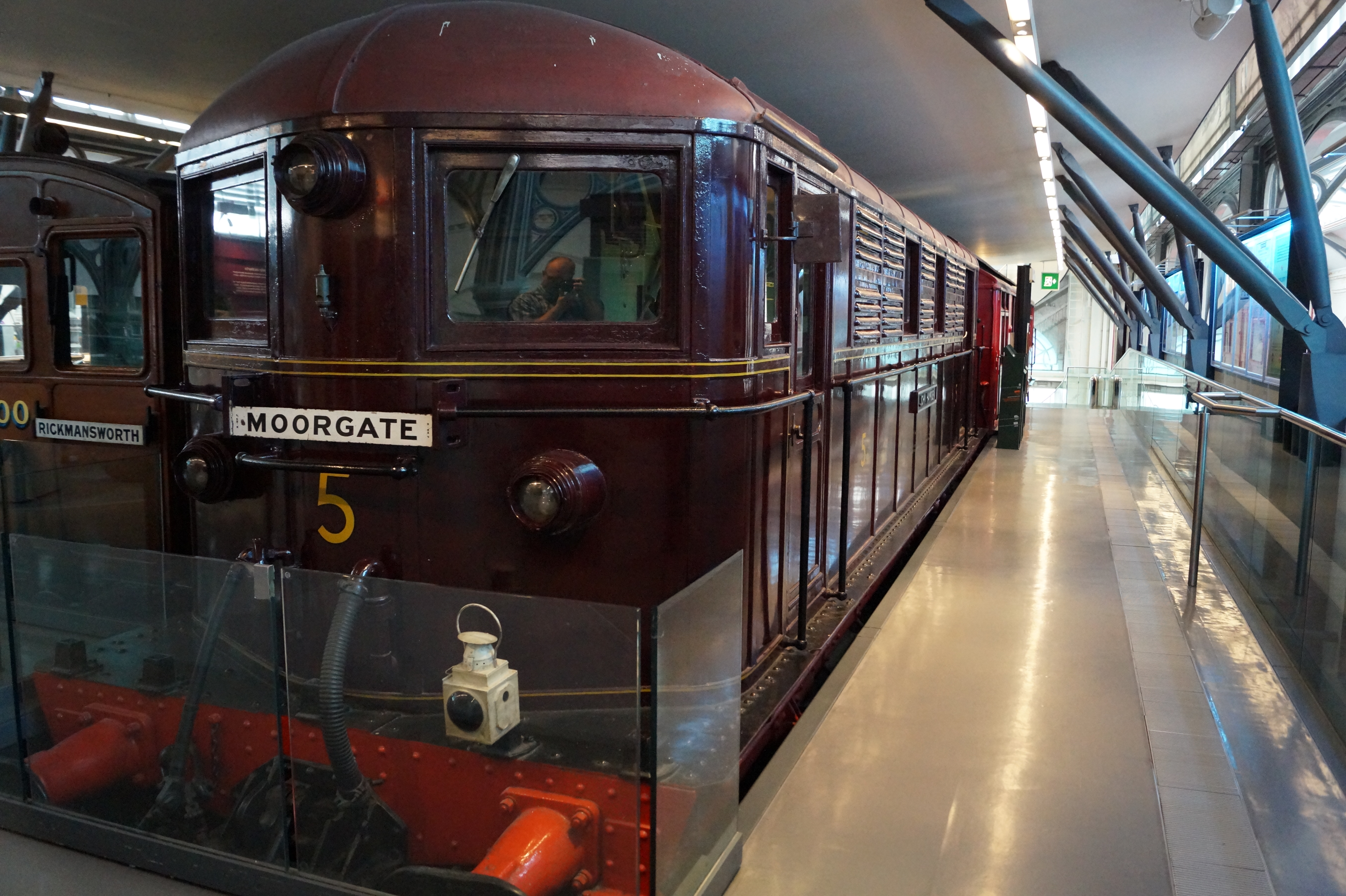
No 5 John Hampden at London Transport Museum, Covent Garden

=== List of Locomotives ===
Key:	Scrapped	Preserved

Number	Name	Withdrawn	Notes
1	John Lyon	1962	Still stored at Neasden Depot in May 1969
2	Oliver Cromwell	1962	Named Thomas Lord in 1953
3	Sir Ralph Verney	1962	
4	Lord Byron	1962	
5	John Hampden	1962	Preserved in the London Transport Museum
6	William Penn	1962	
7	Edmund Burke	1962	
8	Sherlock Holmes	1962	
9	John Milton	1962	
10	William Ewart Gladstone	1962	
11	George Romney	1962	
12	Sarah Siddons	1962	Preserved in working order
13	Dick Whittington	1962	
14	Benjamin Disraeli	1962	
15	Wembley 1924	1951	Scrapped following an accident
16	Oliver Goldsmith	1962	Scrapped in 1966
17	Florence Nightingale	1943	Scrapped following an accident
18	Michael Faraday	1962	Scrapped in 1966
19	John Wycliffe	1948	
20	Sir Christopher Wren	1954	Scrapped following an accident

== Accidents and incidents ==
- On 18 June 1925, locomotive No.4 collided with a passenger train at Baker Street station when a signal was changed from green to red just as the locomotive was passing it. Six people were injured.
