= Train driver =

Operator of a railway train

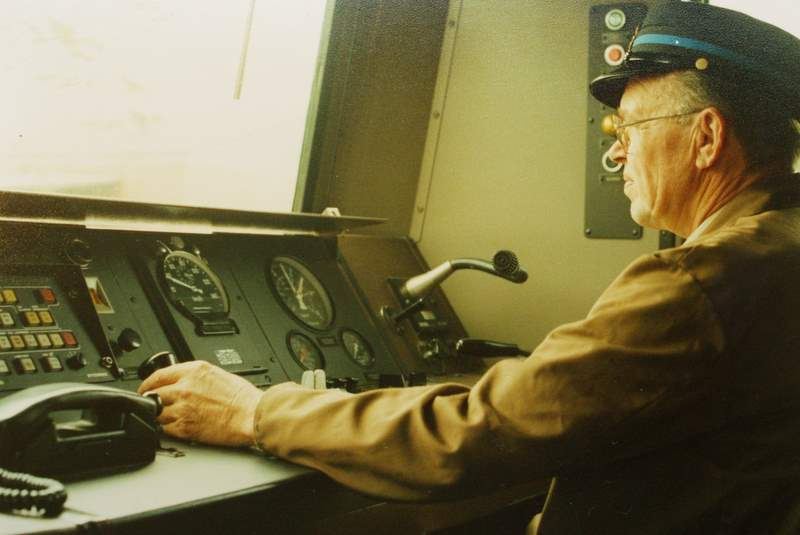
- DSB train driver in 1987

Occupation
- Occupation type: Engine occupation
- Activity sectors: Rail transport

Description
- Competencies: Operating locomotive, multiple unit train, tram, or other rail transport vehicle
- Related jobs: Fireman, secondman

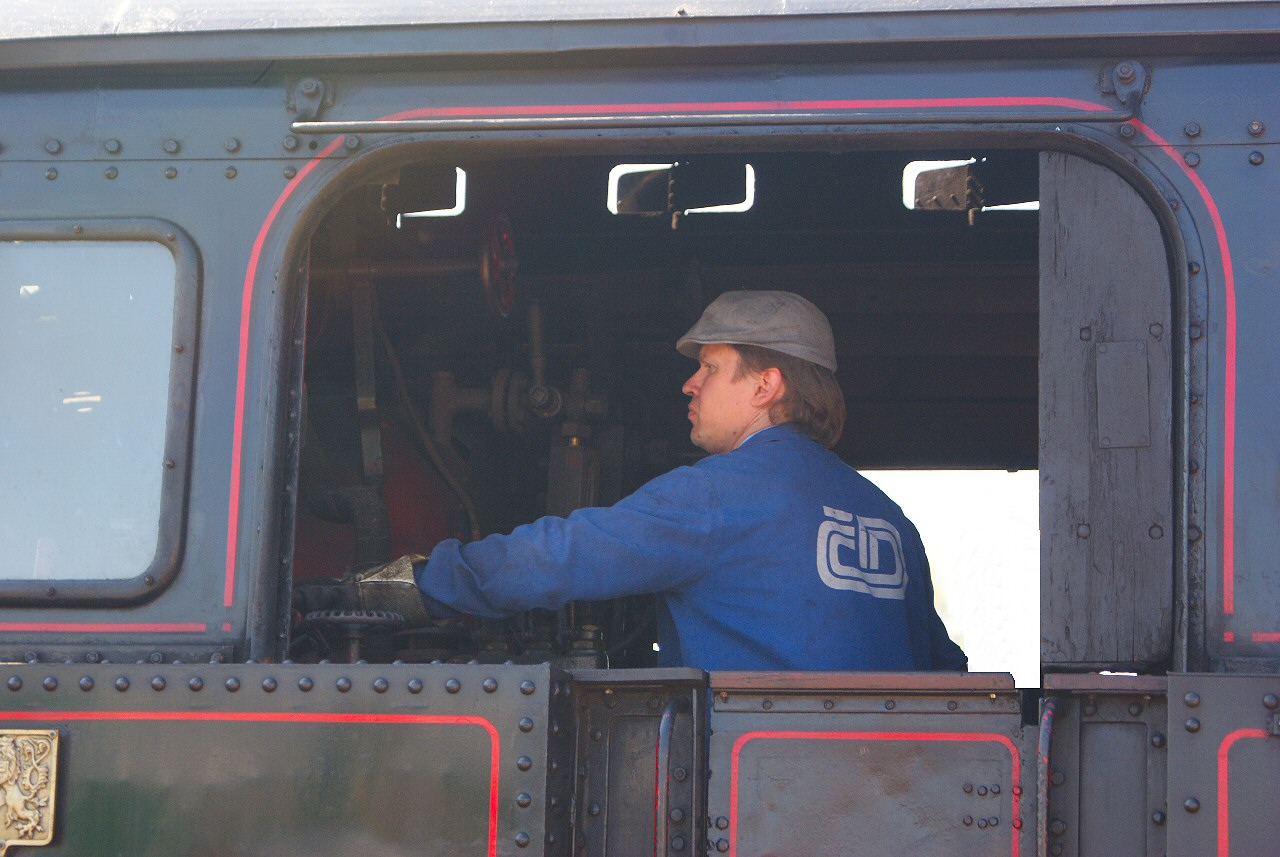
Czech steam locomotive driver

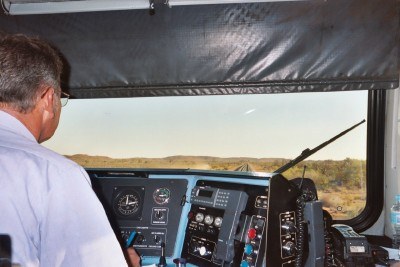
The cab of a New South Wales Xplorer diesel multiple unit

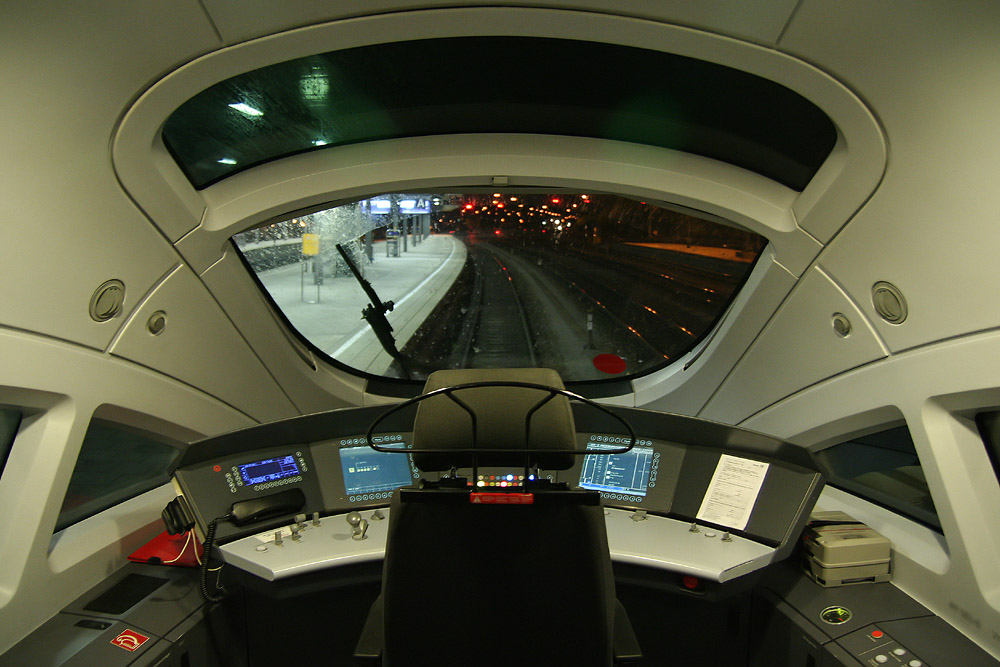
Inside the train driver's cab of a German ICE train

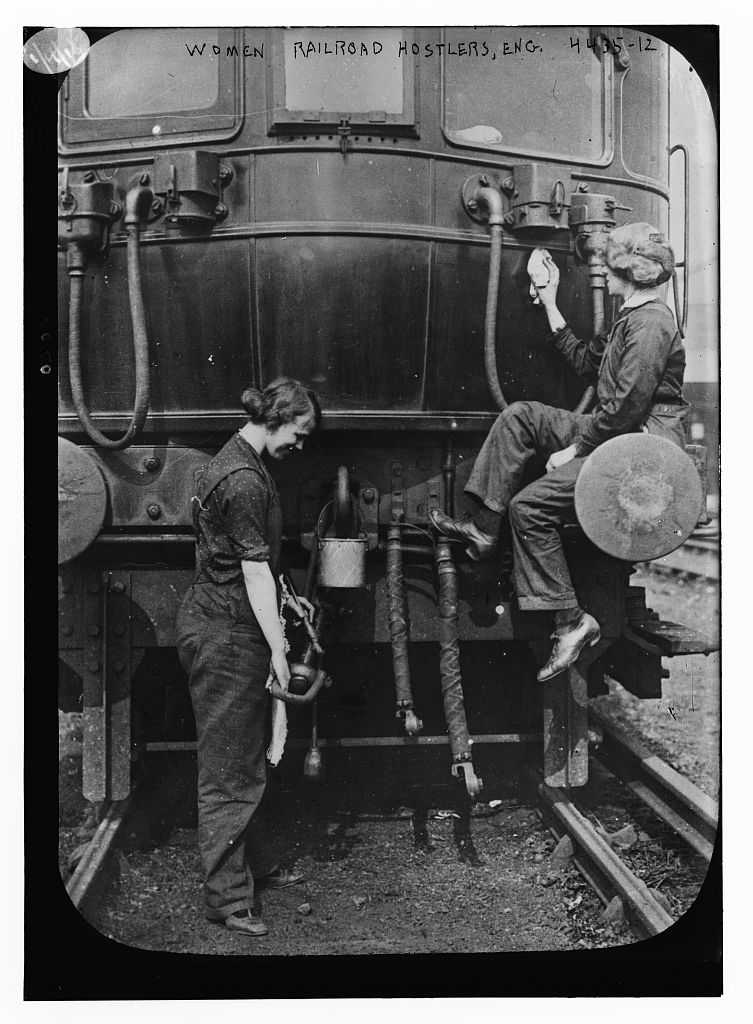
Women railway shunters, England, c. 1915–1920

A train driver is a person who operates a train, railcar, or other rail transport vehicle. The driver is in charge of and responsible for the mechanical operation of the train, train speed, and all train handling (also known as brake handling). Train drivers must follow specific guidelines to drive a train safely.

== Naming ==
British English terms for a train driver include engine driver, engineman, and locomotive driver. The term in North American English is railroad engineer, but the simpler term engineer is more commonly used. Terms for a train driver in other English dialects include locomotive handler, locomotive engineer, locomotive operator, train operator, and motorman. In American English, a hostler (also known as a switcher) moves engines around rail yards, but does not take them out on the main line tracks; the British English equivalent is a shunter.

== Career progression ==
For many American railroads, the following career progression is typical: assistant conductor (brakeman), train conductor, and finally the engineer. For many years, the fireman was next in line to be an engineer, but that classification has been eliminated. In the US, engineers are required to be certified and must then be re-certified every two to three years.

The traditional career progression in the United Kingdom (for steam locomotives) was engine cleaner, passed engine cleaner (i.e., the employee has passed the assessment for fireman), fireman, passed fireman (i.e., passed the assessment for driver), and driver. Michael Reynolds, locomotive inspector of the London, Brighton and South Coast Railway, proposed a system of locomotive driving certificates to stimulate improvements in service and competence. However, no such system was ever universally adopted by the railways of the UK.

In India, a driver starts as a diesel assistant (or electrical assistant for electric locomotives). They then get promoted on a scale: goods, passenger, mail express, and the Rajdhani, Shatabdi, and Duronto express services.

The British transport historian Christian Wolmar wrote in October 2013 that train operators employed by the Rio Tinto Group to transport iron ore across the Australian outback were likely to be the highest-paid members of the occupation in the world at that time.

== Notable train drivers ==
- Ben Chifley, former Prime Minister of Australia
- Christine Gonzalez, first female driver for a Class 1 railroad.
- Karen Harrison, first female train driver in the UK.
- Casey Jones, American engineer whose wreck on the Illinois Central Railroad on April 30, 1900, was immortalized in verse and music.

== See also ==
- Conductor
- Fireman
- Motorman
- Secondman
