= Secondman =

Occupation
- Synonyms: Driver's assistant
- Occupation type: Engine occupation
- Activity sectors: Rail transport

Description
- Competencies: Assisting train driver
- Related jobs: Train driver, fireman

A secondman or driver's assistant is a railway employee who assists the driver of a train.

== Background ==
Historically, due to the pervasive use of steam traction, locomotives were always crewed by at least two people: a driver and a fireman. The driver handled the driving controls, whereas the fireman was responsible for maintaining the fire and water level in the boiler to ensure that the appropriate steam pressure was maintained.

Drivers were only recruited internally from railway staff. A person wishing to become a driver would begin as an engine cleaner, progressing to become a fireman after a period which varied between depots depending on vacancies which were filled on a seniority basis. Progression from Cleaner to Fireman, and Fireman to Driver was on a dead men’s shoes basis. As a fireman, they would begin to learn the duties of the driver, and on passing the relevant tests and examinations become a driver themselves. After a period of time as either a cleaner or fireman, they may become qualified to carry the roles of fireman, or driver, thereafter being known as Passed Cleaner, or Passed Fireman.

== Diesel and electric traction ==
=== Secondmen ===
Diesel and electric traction, which lacked a fire and a boiler requiring constant maintenance, made the job of a fireman obsolete. However, there were still many duties to be performed with diesel and electric traction that the driver could not do by themselves, such as preparation of locomotives, operation of train heating systems, shunting duties, and many others. This role was filled by the secondman. The secondman was also expected to observe signals and keep a good lookout, as an augmentation to the driver's own observation and other systems such as the automatic warning system. In addition, under the instruction of their driver, secondmen would be allowed on occasion to drive the train in order to learn the practical skills necessary to become a driver themselves.

By June 1972 electric multiple unit trains on the line through Eltham station did not carry secondmen, although diesel trains on the same line did.

=== Second drivers on high speed services ===
Even when the role of secondman was being phased out, all trains travelling at speeds of over 100mph were required to have a second, fully-qualified driver in the cab. The purpose of the second driver was to provide a lookout for signals and ensure that the main driver had responded to the signals correctly, in absence of other safety systems such as Automatic Train Protection or Train Protection and Warning System. In 1988 the requirement was relaxed slightly to allow services to operate at speeds of up to 110mph with only one driver.

=== Trainman (Driver) ===
The Traincrew Agreement of 1988 scrapped the concept of a secondman and replaced it with the role of "Trainman (Driver)". The purpose of this specific role was to be present on trains where the presence of a second person in the cab was required but it was not necessary to have two fully qualified drivers. The role of trainman was more versatile than that of secondman, as trainmen could be trained in guarding duties, allowing one person to act as a secondman on one service and a guard on another service, within the same duty.

The Traincrew Agreement also re-structured the railways so that secondmen were not required on the vast majority of trains. Certain trains were still required to have a trainman present in the cab in addition to the driver:

- Light locomotives on journeys exceeding 10 miles in length where said locomotive was not fitted with a driver safety device
- High Speed Train power cars working light engine
- Class 20 locomotives working bonnet first
- Other train movements as determined by a Regional Manning Committee

In September 1996 the requirement for double manning was ended entirely.

== Modern use ==
With increasing automation of rolling stock, many trains today only require the operation of a single driver, and thus this post has started to disappear. However, it remains in many places, especially on heavy freight, express routes and night trains. Trainee drivers (often known as traction trainees) may also act as secondmen in order to learn routes and operating methods.

Certain railway lines in the UK (for example, the East Suffolk Line) are not approved for driver-only operation. Passenger trains will usually have a driver and a guard, but empty stock movements would require a secondperson (usually a second qualified driver) or a guard to accompany the driver.

On heritage railways, where the older types of locomotives are still in use, the position of second man is still an important role filled by volunteers, and usually part of the training to become a driver.
