= 1982 visit by Pope John Paul II to the United Kingdom =

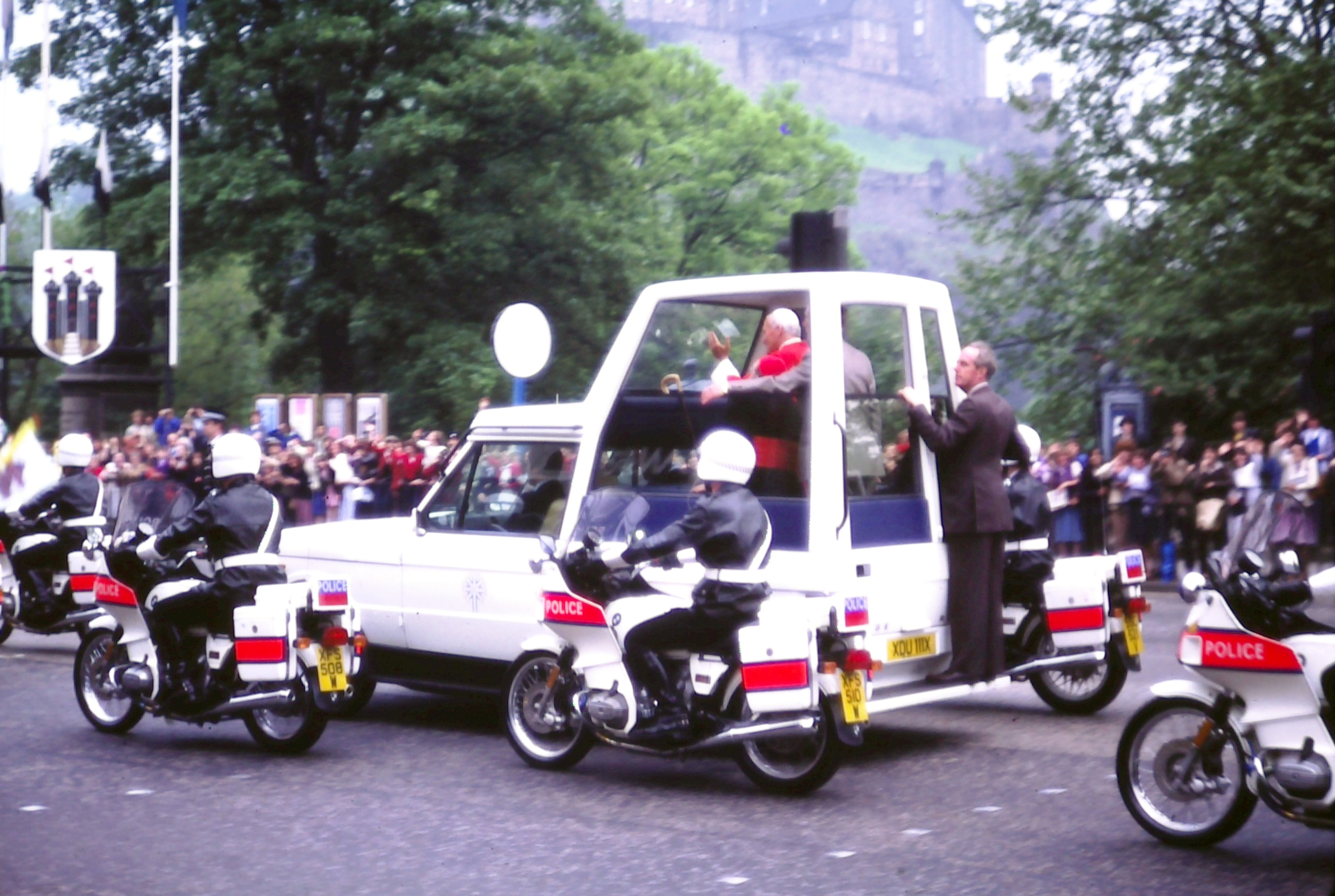
Pope John Paul II arrives in Edinburgh's Princes Street on 31 May 1982.

The visit of Pope John Paul II to the United Kingdom in 1982 was the first visit there by a reigning pope. The Pope arrived in the UK on Friday 28 May, and during his time there visited nine cities, delivering 16 major addresses. Among significant events were a meeting with Queen Elizabeth II, the Supreme Governor of the Church of England; a joint service alongside Robert Runcie, then the Archbishop of Canterbury, at Canterbury Cathedral; meeting with and addressing the General Assembly of the Church of Scotland at The Mound; and five large open air Masses in London, Coventry, Manchester, Glasgow, and Cardiff. Following his six-day visit which took him to locations in England, Scotland and Wales, he returned to the Vatican on 2 June.

Unlike the 2010 papal visit of his successor, Pope Benedict XVI, John Paul II's was a pastoral rather than a state visit, and was consequently funded by the Catholic Church in the UK rather than the Government. The trip was almost cancelled because Britain was then at war with Argentina, which had invaded the British possession of the Falkland Islands. This visit had to be balanced for fairness with an unscheduled trip to Argentina that June. Over 2 million people attended events hosted by the Pope, with the visit said to be the biggest event for British Catholics since their emancipation.

== Background ==
The visit, the first to the United Kingdom made by a reigning pope, was organised, and largely funded, by the Roman Catholic Church at an estimated cost of around £7 million (the equivalent of about £20M in 2010). In contrast to the 2010 visit by Pope Benedict XVI, it was a pastoral rather than a state visit. The Church offered the public free access to all papal events. There were concerns about the Pope's health following an attempt on his life the previous year, and security was of utmost importance during the visit.

The itinerary for the visit was drafted 42 times before the Vatican finally approved it. However, John Paul's trip was nearly cancelled after Argentina's invasion of the Falkland Islands, and the subsequent war between Britain and Argentina, just weeks before it was scheduled to take place. The visit only went ahead after intervention from Archbishop of Glasgow, Thomas Winning and Archbishop of Liverpool, Derek Worlock, and an agreement that the pontiff would not meet Prime Minister Margaret Thatcher.

== The visit ==
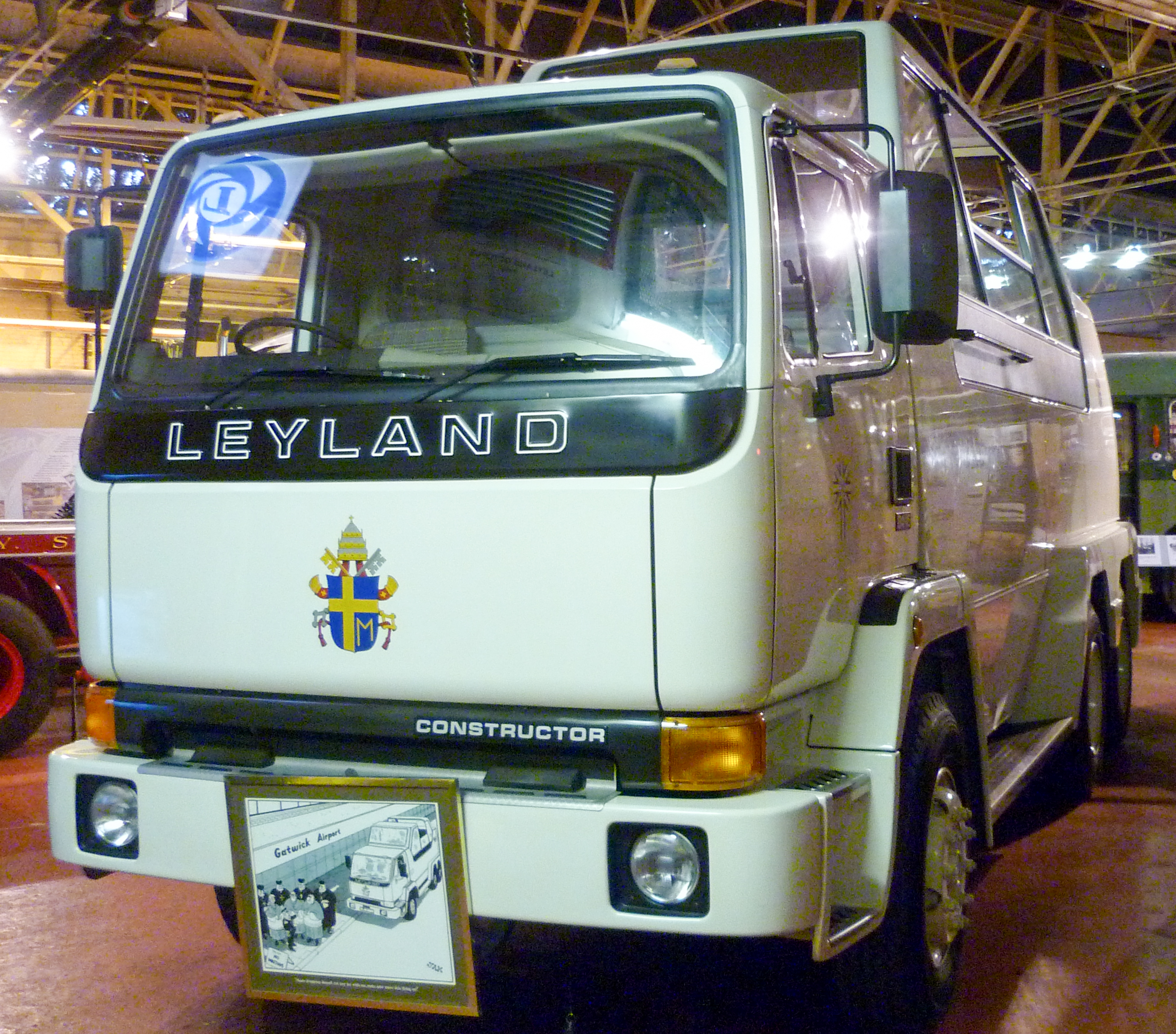
One of the two popemobiles coachbuilt on Leyland Constructor chassis for Pope John Paul II's visit to the United Kingdom in May/June 1982

=== England ===
John Paul II arrived in the United Kingdom on the morning of 28 May 1982, landing at Gatwick Airport. After kissing the runway, he was greeted there by 3,500 singing children, Basil Cardinal Hume, Archbishop of Westminster and Cormac Murphy-O'Connor, Bishop of Arundel and Brighton (the Roman Catholic diocese in which the airport is located). Also present was Anglican Bishop Eric Kemp of Chichester (the Anglican diocese in which the airport is located), already showing the visit's noteworthy reconciliatory character towards the Church of England. The Pope later travelled from Gatwick Airport railway station to London Victoria by special train 975025 Caroline and from there went to Westminster Cathedral, where he celebrated his first Mass of the visit. During his first day in Britain he departed from his prepared text on three occasions, calling for peace in the Falklands and in Northern Ireland. Also on that day he met Queen Elizabeth II, the Supreme Governor of the Church of England.

On 29 May John Paul II visited Canterbury Cathedral, becoming the first pontiff to do so and participating in an historic meeting with the Prince of Wales (now King Charles III), before attending a ceremony with the Archbishop of Canterbury, Robert Runcie. During the service, the two church leaders renewed their baptismal vows together, knelt in silent prayer at the spot where Thomas Becket was murdered in 1170, and issued a common declaration, thanking God for "the progress that has been made in the work of reconciliation" between the Catholic Church and the Church of England. Later that day, he went through Wembley by means of a procession, then celebrated Mass at Wembley Stadium in the presence of 80,000 people. The crowd gave him a standing ovation, and sang "He's Got the Whole World in His Hands".

On 30 May, after a meeting with over 20,000 of his fellow Polish countrymen at the Crystal Palace stadium in London, the Pope travelled by helicopter to Coventry, where he celebrated Mass at the city's Baginton Airport in the presence of some 300,000 people. In his address, he described Coventry as a "city devastated by war but rebuilt in hope". Afterwards, he travelled to Liverpool, where over a million spectators lined the route of his journey from the airport in Speke to the city. He attended services at the city's Metropolitan Cathedral and the Anglican cathedral. Two thousand people attended his Mass at the Metropolitan Cathedral. After Mass, the Pope greeted young people gathered outside the cathedral.

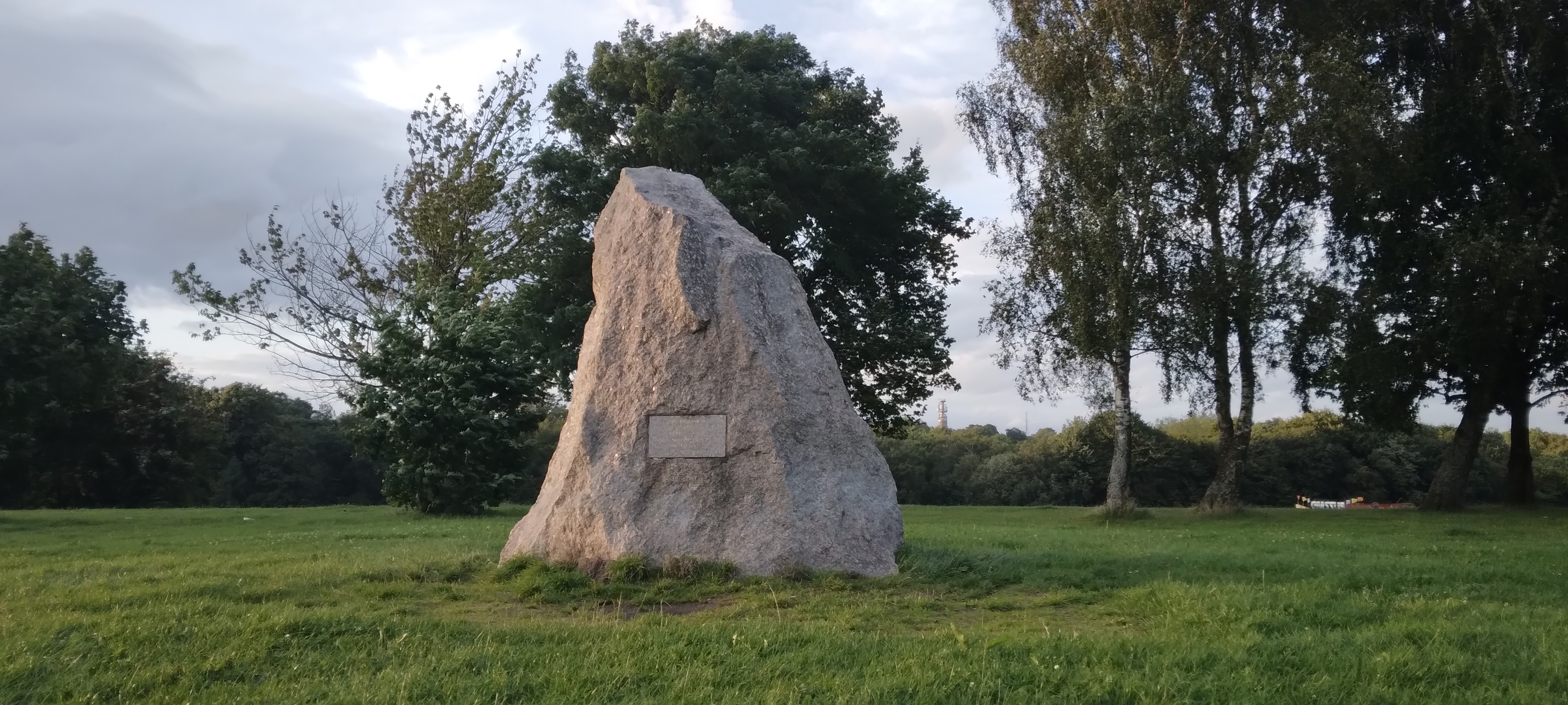
Papal Monument in Heaton Park, Manchester commemorating the visit

On 31 May, the Pope visited Manchester, where he met the Chief Rabbi of the United Kingdom, Sir Immanuel Jakobovits at the Convent of the Poor Sisters of Nazareth. At Heaton Park he celebrated Mass in front of a crowd of more than 200,000 people, during which he ordained twelve men to the priesthood, telling them; "You must be men of God, his close friends. You must develop daily patterns of prayer, and penance must be a regular part of your life." The Pope then travelled by helicopter to Knavesmire Racecourse in York where some 200,000 people gathered for a Liturgy of the Word.

=== Scotland ===
After the York ceremony, the Pope was taken to RAF Leeming from where he flew by jet to Edinburgh in Scotland, landing at RAF Turnhouse, Edinburgh. At Murrayfield Stadium, he met with 45,000 young people and leaders of Protestant churches, before finishing the day with a visit to the city's Catholic cathedral.

On 1 June, John Paul II firstly visited patients at St Joseph's Hospital in Rosewell and addressed educators at St Andrew's College, before celebrating Mass at Bellahouston Park for 300,000 people. The Pope was presented with several symbolic gifts during the service, including a pipe banner with the Pope's coat of arms, a piece of Caithness glass, a firkin of whisky and a Scotland football shirt. He told worshippers "as believers, we are constantly exposed to pressures by modern society which would compel us to conform to the standards of this secular age, substitute new proprieties, restrict our aspirations at risk of compromising our Christian conscience."

=== Wales ===
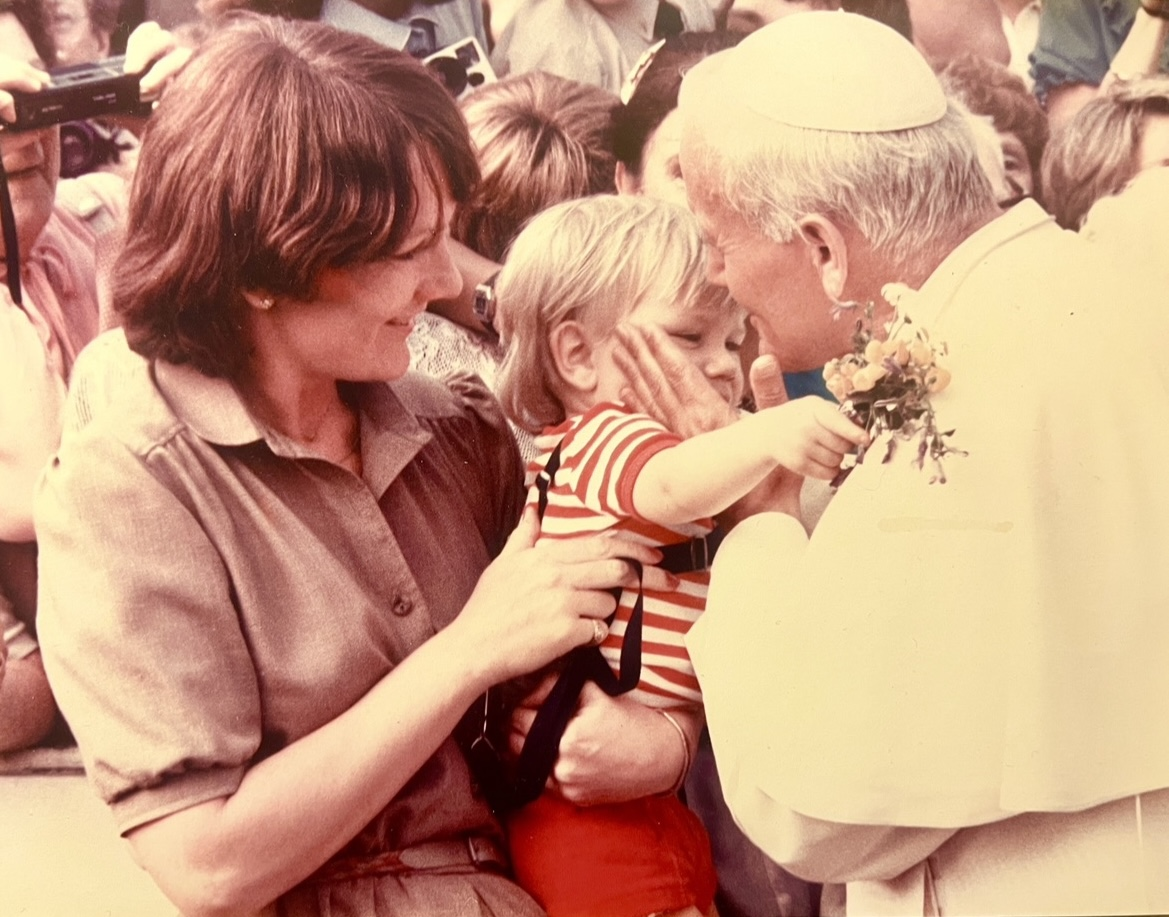
During the visit to Cardiff, the Pope blessed (the now) artist, Dan Llywelyn Hall. In this photo, the artist's mother (Bridget Hall) can be seen presenting Dan.

The Welsh leg of the trip took place on 2 June with the Pope's arrival in Cardiff. After he was awarded the Freedom of Cardiff, a city which received its royal charter from Queen Elizabeth I in 1581, several years after she had been declared deposed by Pope Pius V in his bull Regnans in Excelsis (departing from his decision to avoid political meetings during his visit), John Paul II travelled to Pontcana Fields where he celebrated Mass for over 100,000 people, speaking briefly in Welsh to declare "Bendith Duw arnoch" – "the blessing of God be on you" – which was received with enthusiastic applause. Afterwards, he went on to Ninian Park, home of Cardiff City F.C., where he met with approximately 33,000 young people, again calling for peace in the South Atlantic and then calling on the young people of Britain to launch a crusade of prayer. In a direct reference to King Henry VIII's book Defence of the Seven Sacraments for which he received the title Fidei defensor (Defender of the Faith) from Pope Leo X, one of the Sacraments was highlighted at each papal venue.

=== Public opinion ===
The speeches for John Paul's visit were written following consultation with British clerics, including the future archbishop of Westminster, Vincent Nichols. These were largely well received by the public, with some two million people attending venues to see the Pope and hear him speak. According to the BBC's Michael Hirst, John Paul II's visit to the United Kingdom was the biggest event for British Catholics since their emancipation during the 19th century. In contrast to the generally positive reaction, there were a small number of demonstrations, mostly by supporters of the Northern Ireland Democratic Unionist Party leader, the Rev. Ian Paisley, and other small groups.

== See also ==
- Pastoral trips of Pope John Paul II
- Roman Catholicism in the United Kingdom
- Anglican Schism
