= Loram Maintenance of Way =

American railroad maintenance company

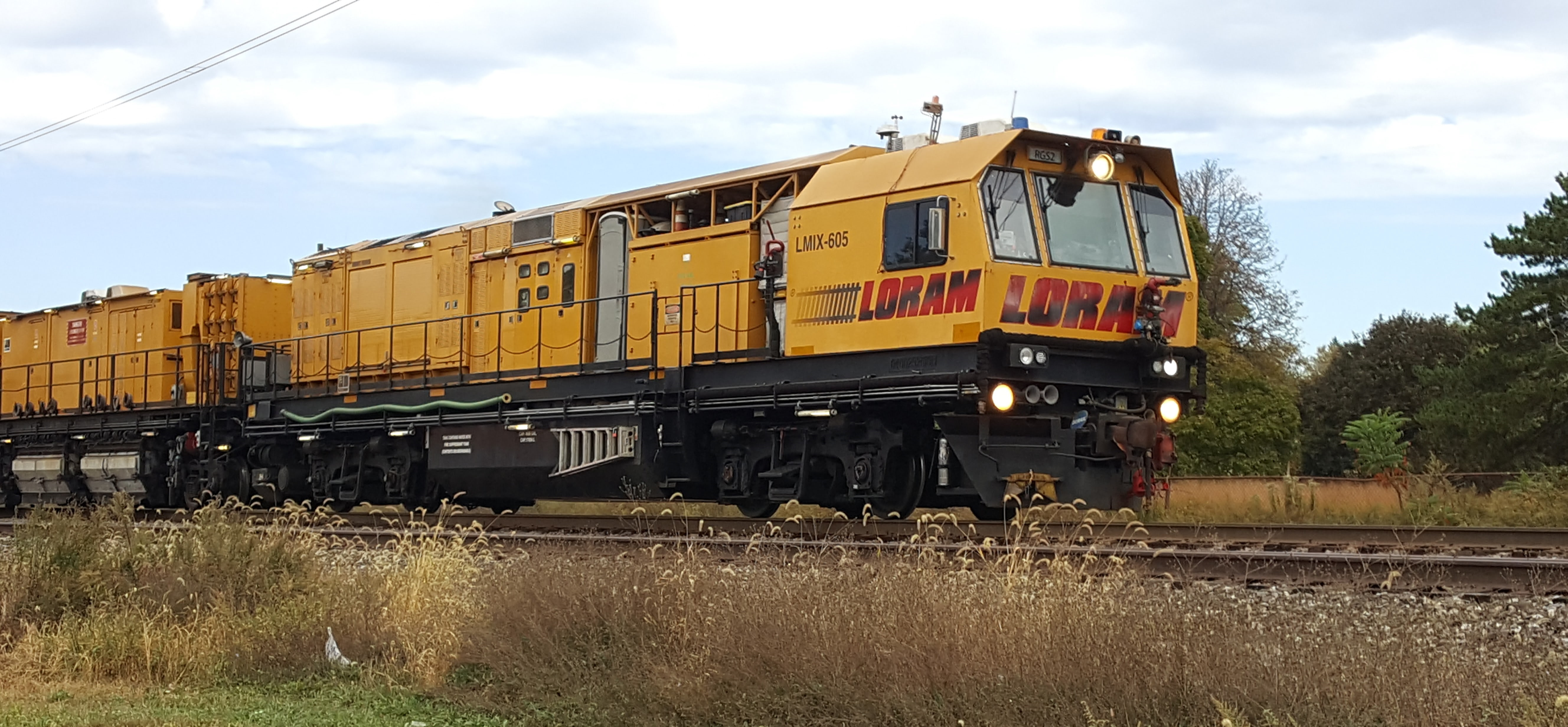
- A Loram RG 400 series grinding track in Cleveland, Ohio
- Type: Private
- Industry: Railroad maintenance equipment and services provider
- Founded: 1954; 72 years ago
- Founder: Fred Mannix
- Headquarters: Hamel, Minnesota, United States
- Area served: Worldwide
- Website: loram.com

Loram Maintenance of Way (reporting mark LMIX) is a railroad maintenance equipment and services provider. Loram provides railway track maintenance services to freight, passenger and transit railroads worldwide, as well as sells and leases equipment which performs these functions.

== History ==
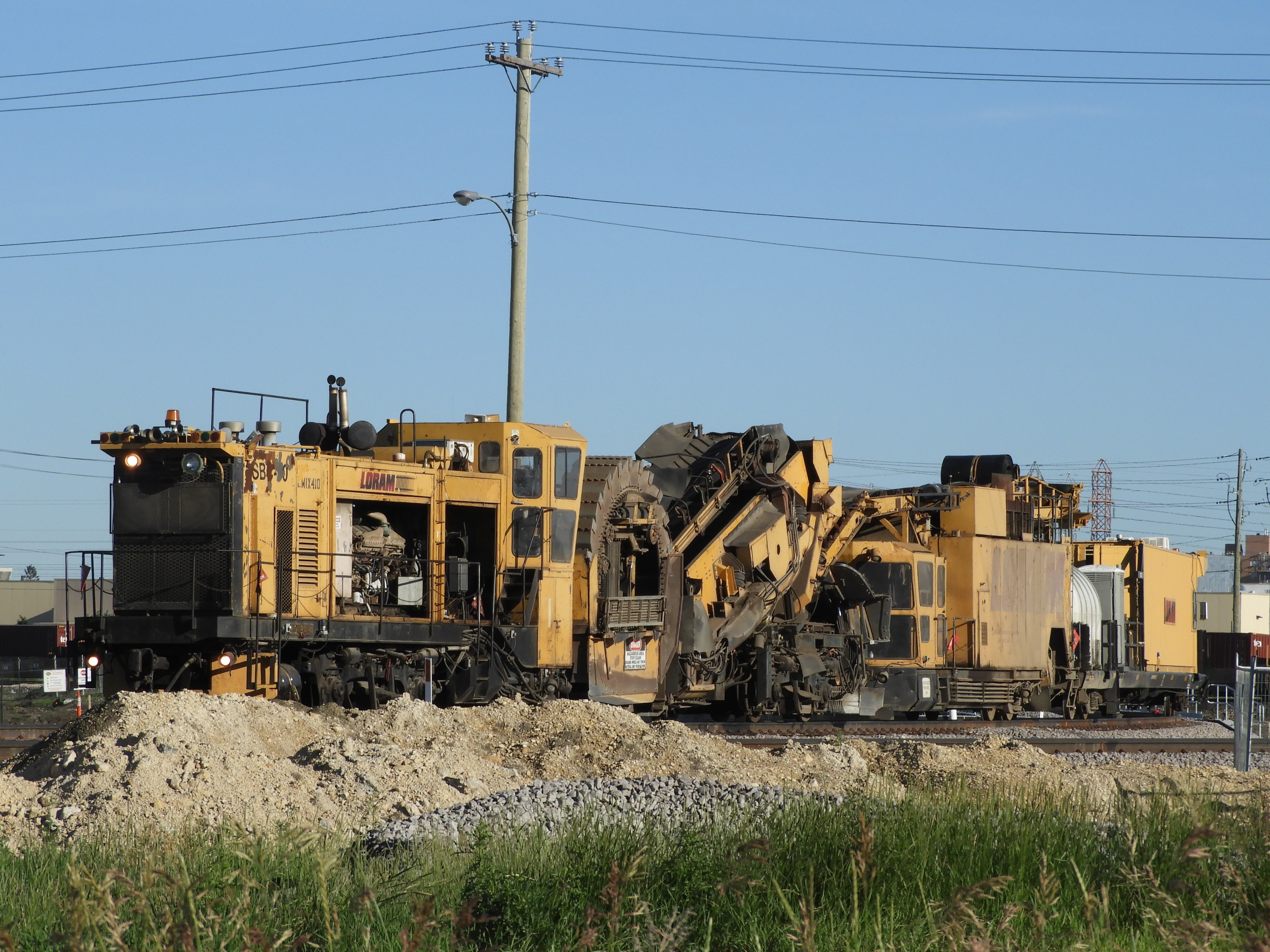
Loram ballast cleaner in Winnipeg Canada in July 2019

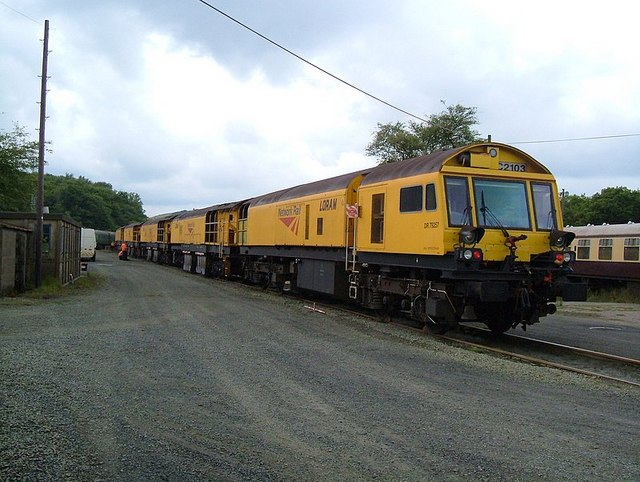
A Loram C2103 railgrinder at work near Okehampton, England

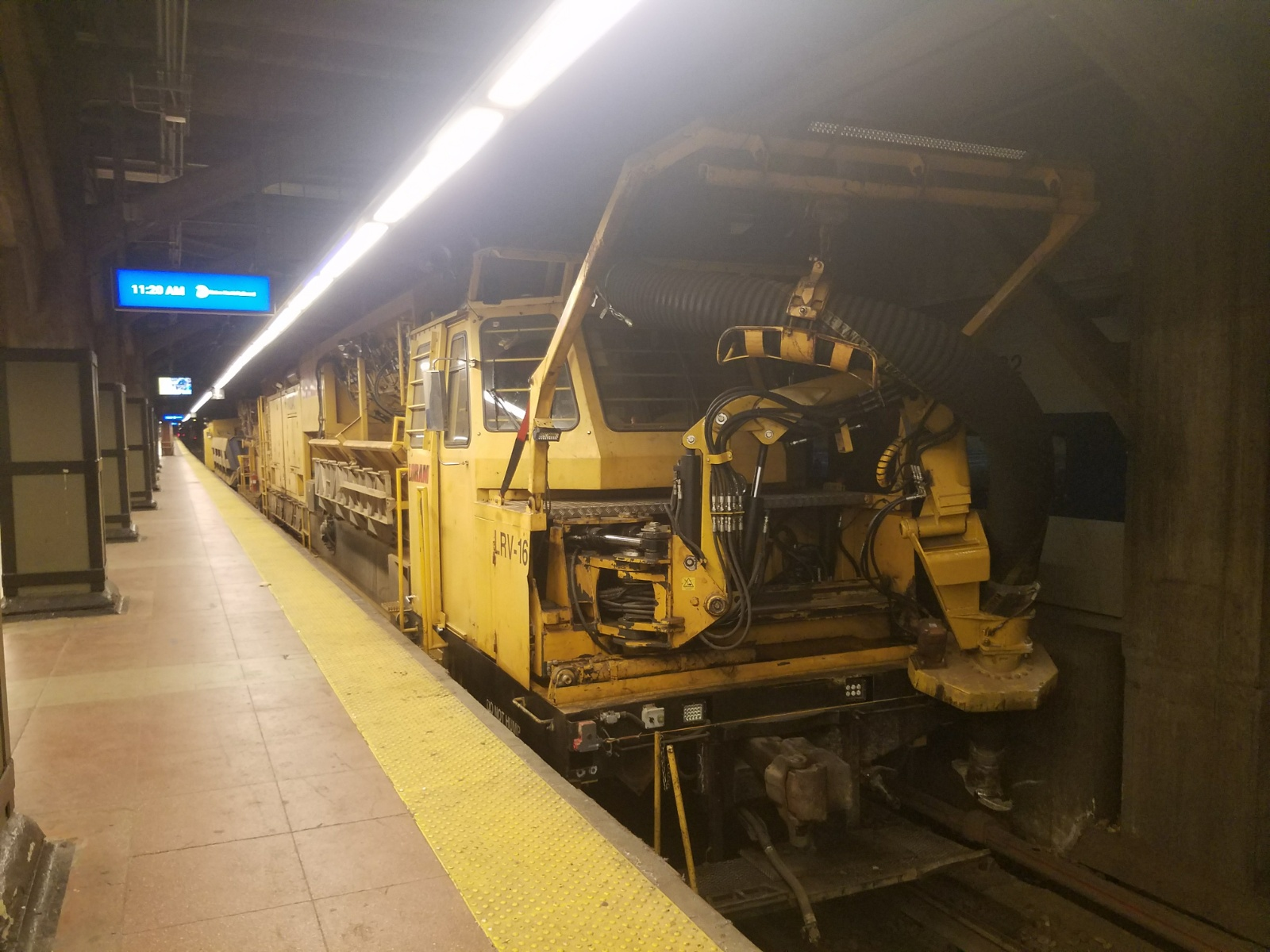
Metro-North/Loram LRV-16 Railvac Roadway Maintenance Machine at Track 25 of Grand Central Terminal, New York

Loram Maintenance of Way was founded in 1954 in Hamel, Minnesota, in the United States by Canadian businessman Fred Mannix. The company name is an abbreviation of the phrase "long-range Mannix".

Loram initially acted as a contractor for railways, cleaning ballast on track beds. The rough edges of ballast rock not only support the ties and hold them in place, but also help water drain away from the track bed. Over time, ballast becomes clogged with earth, weeds, and debris, inhibiting its drainage properties. Its major competitor in this field was Speno Rail Services (later owned by Pandrol-Jackson, and still later by Harsco Technologies). Over time, Loram replaced its large work crews with automated machines which can clean ballast 2 to 2.5 feet (0.61 to 0.76 m) in depth.

The company's first mechanical products were the Mannix Sled and Mannix Plow, both developed in the late 1950s. The Mannix Sled was a device towed behind a locomotive which raised the rails and ties and cleared the ballast between the ties (a process known as "skeletonizing"). The Mannix Sled would be followed by a work crew which manually refilled the empty space with clean ballast. The Mannix Plow was a device which lifted both rails and ties, while three blades passed below them and removed all the ballast. This left the ties and rail lying on bare earth; a large work crew followed, lifting the rails again and replacing the ballast. The concept of lifting the rails and ties was counterintuitive, but it revolutionized railbed rehabilitation. In 1959, Loram introduced the Auto-Track. Designed to work behind either a Mannix Plow or a Mannix Sled, this device was capable to detaching a damaged or broken tie from the rail and ejecting it to one side.

Loram began grinding rails in the 1970s. High rates of speed, traffic, and weight can damage rails. The burrs and cracks created can damage train wheels, slow traffic, and cause rails to degrade faster. Grinding rails in place helps to avoid these problems and lengthen rail life. However, while Speno had its crews living on its grinding trains, Loram did not. Its crews lived off-site while working, which meant Loram grinding vehicles were shorter and less complicated. Grinding carries with it a significant risk of fire, as sparks from the grinding process can ignite nearby vegetation. As such, Loram's first grinders carried a caboose equipped with extensive firefighting equipment, and its crews were trained firefighters. The company later introduced an automatic firefighting system to its grinding vehicles, which eliminated the need for the firefighting caboose. About 1986, Loram introduced the SX-16, which could grind railroad switches (including switch points, frogs, and wing rails) as well as track. By 1992, Loram had more than a dozen grinders in operation in the United States. In the early 1990's the VISTA system was created by Dr. Robert Monson and Darwin Isdahl in collaboration with VSI in Minneapolis (US patent 5,140,776). In the late 1990s, working with KLD Labs, Loram enhanced the VISion Transverse Analyzer (VISTA), a computer guided grinding system. The VISTA system employs lasers to identify the rail profile and any defects. The computer then chooses an optimal solution, and guides the vehicle as it grinds the rail to this profile. The system is captures removed metal and places it into a waste storage compartment rather than leaving it on the track. In the mid 2000s, Loram introduced the RG400 rail grinder, which doubled efficiency to roughly 60 miles (97 km) per day, was lower-emission, and had markedly improved safety features. A variation of this vehicle, the RGI series railgrinder, was developed specifically for the international market and has been sold in Colombia, India, Mexico, and in Scandinavia.

About 1987, Loram introduced the Badger ditch digging vehicle. This machine, which rides on railroad rails, can reach up to 18 feet (5.5 m) to either side and dig a drainage ditch up to 4 feet (1.2 m) deep and 30 to 54 inches (76 to 137 cm) wide.

Since the 1990s, Loram has also been offering rail inspection services. Loram adapts commercial consumer vehicles for use on rails, and has developed a computerized, laser inspection system which compares the rail to a pre-determined profile in order to identify damage. Each rail is identified using its Differential GPS location. The rail inspection can be used to develop a unique railgrinding plan that will adjust grindstone speed, location, and number of passes required to fix the damage and achieve a new optimal rail profile. Loram also analyzes the removed metal to evaluate rail performance and grinding results.

Loram introduced Railvac in 2000. This 90-foot (27 m) car can both clean and excavate cable trenches, pole footings, railroad crossings, and railroad switches.

In 2011, Loram purchased Tranergy Corporation, manufacturer of main line and railyard track friction lubricants and lubricant dispensers and switch lubrication devices.

In 2014 Loram acquired a 51% stake in Rail Vehicle Engineering based in Derby, England, which was founded in 2007 after the collapse of FM Rail. In 2016 Loram took full ownership.

== Operations ==
Loram provides maintenance of way services to Class I and shortline railroads, rapid transit systems, and commuter rail systems worldwide. The Railway Supply Institute said in 2015 that Loram was "one of the leading suppliers of track maintenance machinery and services in North America and the global market". Every Class I railroad in North America uses its equipment, and it is widely acknowledged to be the industry leader in grinding equipment.

Loram both leases and sells its equipment. Its leases with major customers usually last about five years.

Railgrinding remains the company's core. As of 2015, its rail grinding vehicles included the RG 400 Series (for Class I and other railroads with heavy loads and traffic); the RGI Series (an RG 400 Series modified for the international market); the C44 Series (a rail grinder sold in international markets where clearance and axle weight are restricted); the RGS Series (a specialty railgrinder used on railroad crossings and switches); and the L Series (a lightweight railgrinder used for rapid transit and specialty rail, which can be moved by flatbed truck).

=== Australia ===
Mannix Contractors commenced operations in Australia in June 1961. It was renamed Loram Contractors in the 1970s.

The first major project was, in a joint venture with Morrison Knudsen and McDonald Constructions to build the Hamersley & Robe River railway line in the Pilbara that opened in July 1966. The joint venture also built the Mount Newman railway line.

=== United Kingdom ===
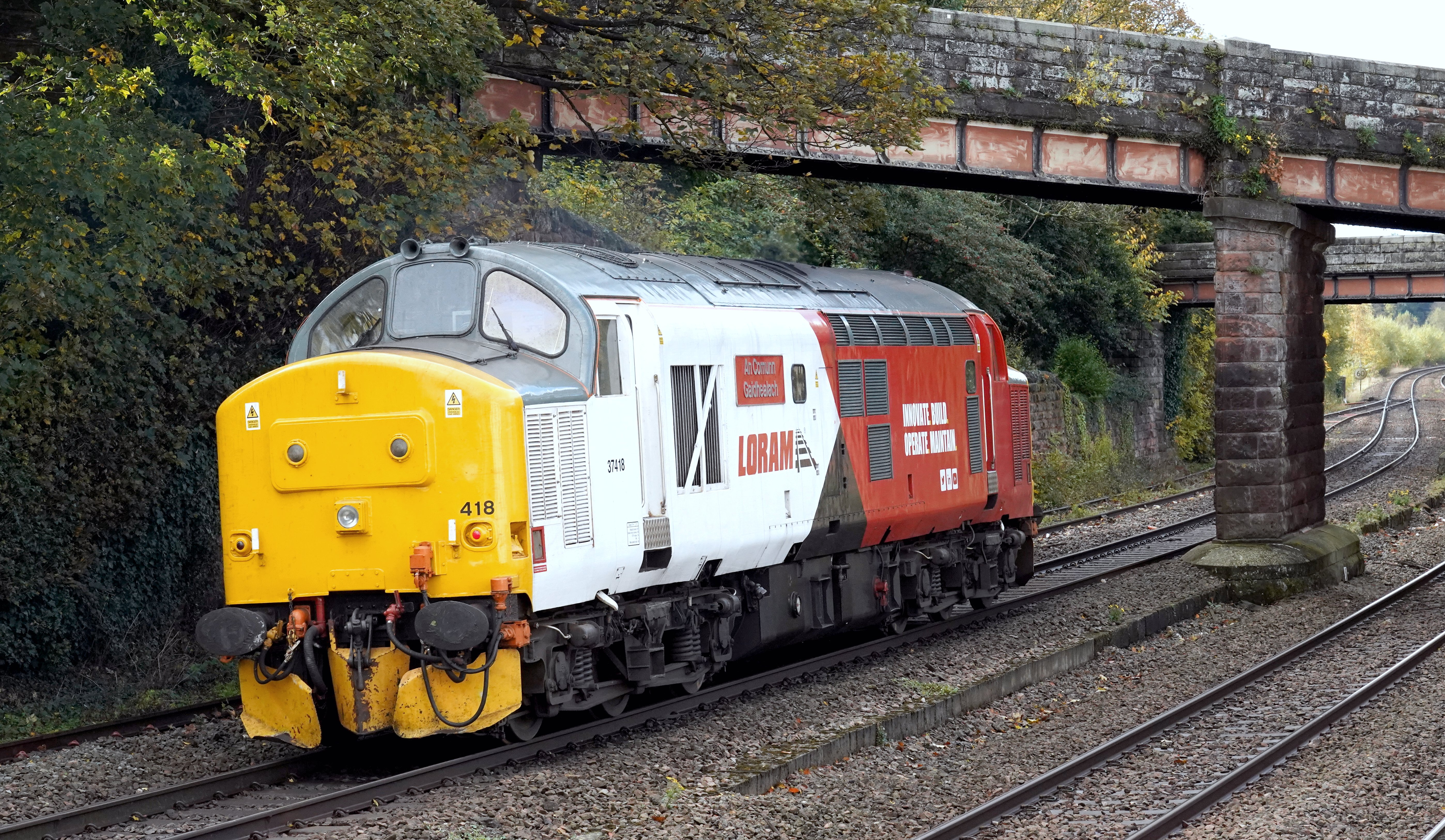
37418 in Loram livery in October 2025

Loram UK occupies part of the former Railway Technical Centre in Derby where it maintains and overhauls traction and rolling stock.

In January 2019, Loram was awarded a contract to maintain Network Rail's New Measurement Train.

In August 2020, Loram was granted an operating licence by the Office of Rail & Road. It hired four Mark 2 carriages from Eastern Rail Services and applied a red, white and black vinyl to promote the company’s range of services.

In 2022, Loram was awarded a contract to maintain Network Rail's 65 infrastructure monitoring vehicles. At the same time, Loram commenced a haulage contract to haul 975025 Caroline with 37418. This will cease in September 2026 when Loram hands its operating licence back to the Office of Rail & Road.

== Bibliography ==
- Allen, G. Freeman (1987). Jane's World Railways 1987-88. New York: Jane's Publishing Company. ISBN 9780710608482.
- The Official Railway Equipment Register. New York: Railway Equipment and Publication Co. 2010.
- Solomon, Brian (2001). Railway Maintenance Equipment: The Men and Machines That Keep the Railroads Running. Osceola, Wisconsin: MBI Publishing. ISBN 9780760309759.
- Solomon, Brian (2007). "Maintenance of Way". In Middleton, William D.; Smerk, George M.; Diehl, Roberta (eds.). Encyclopedia of North American Railroads. Bloomington, Indiana: Indiana University Press. ISBN 9780253349163.
