= List of British Rail Class 43 (HST) power cars =

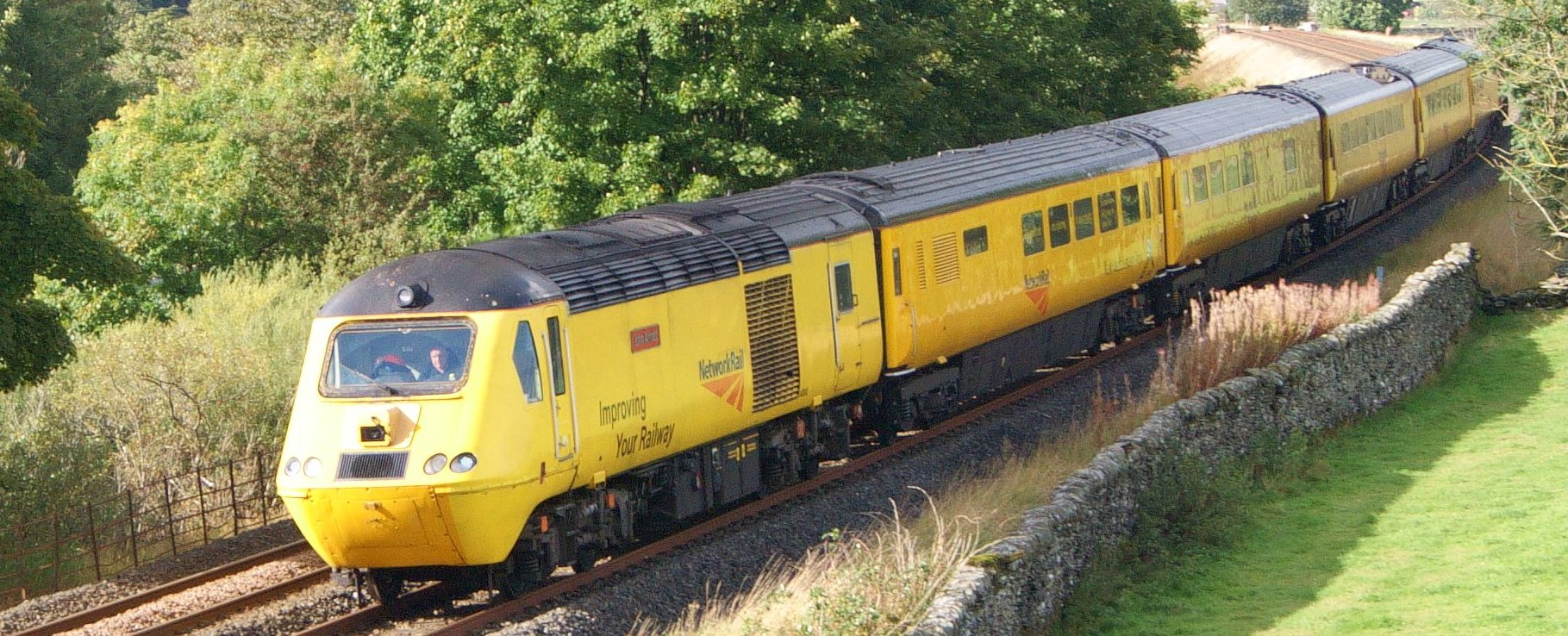

Class 43 (HST) is the TOPS classification used for the power cars of British Rail's InterCity 125 High Speed Train. The power cars were built by British Rail Engineering Limited between 1975 and 1982, and have been in service in the UK since 1976.

== List ==
Key:	In service	Stored	Scrapped	Preserved	Exported

Original Number	New Number	Name	Operator	Previous Operator	Livery	Status	Notes
43002	–	Sir Kenneth Grange	National Railway Museum	Great Western Railway	InterCity Blue & Grey	Preserved	Preserved at the National Railway Museum. Part of the National Collection.
43003	–		ScotRail	Great Western Railway	ScotRail	In service	Formerly Isambard Kingdom Brunel.
43004	–	Caerphilly Castle	Great Western Railway		Great Western Railway	In service	
43005	–	St. Michael's Mount		Great Western Railway	Great Western Railway	Scrapped	Withdrawn 24 February 2023, used as a source of spares at Plymouth Laira depot. Sent for scrap at Sims Metal, Newport on 4 July 2023.
43006	43206			London North Eastern Railway	InterCity Blue & Grey	Stored	Used in LNER HST charity railtour along with 43312. Stored at Ely.
43007	43207		CrossCountry; Midland Mainline	InterCity Blue & Grey	Re-vinyled into British Rail Blue & Grey livery in July 2023.		
43008	43208		London North Eastern Railway CrossCountry	InterCity Swallow	Formerly Lincolnshire Echo. Nameplate sold in 2020. Re-vinyled into InterCity Swallow livery in 2023.		
43009	–	Nunney Castle	Great Western Railway		Great Western Railway	Exported	43010 formerly named TSW Today, denamed January 1993, after TSW stopped broadcasting.
43010	–	Lydford Castle	Great Western Railway		Great Western Railway	Exported	43010 formerly named TSW Today, denamed January 1993, after TSW stopped broadcasting.
43011	–			First Great Western	FGW 'Fag Packet'	Scrapped	Scrapped after the Ladbroke Grove Rail Crash.
43012	–		ScotRail	Great Western Railway	ScotRail	In service	
43013	–	Mark Carne OBE	Network Rail	Virgin CrossCountry	Network Rail Yellow	In service	Used for the New Measurement Train. Buffered.
43014	–	The Railway Observer	Network Rail	Virgin CrossCountry	Network Rail Yellow	In service	Used for the New Measurement Train. Buffered.
43015	–		ScotRail	Great Western Railway	ScotRail	In service	
43016	–	Powderham Castle	Great Western Railway		Great Western Railway	In service	
43017	–			Great Western Railway	First Great Western	Stored	Scrapped
43018	–	The Red Cross	Crewe Heritage Centre	Great Western Railway	Intercity Blue and Grey	Preserved	Preserved at Crewe Heritage Centre.
43019	–			First Great Western	First Great Western	Scrapped	Scrapped after the Ufton Nervet Rail Crash.
43020	–			Great Western Railway	First Great Western	Stored	Scrapped
43021	–		ScotRail	Great Western Railway	ScotRail	In service	
43022	–	Nether Stowey Castle		Great Western Railway	Great Western Railway	Exported	Withdrawn 21 January 2023, stored at Plymouth Laira depot. Exported to Mexico in August 2023 as FIT3008.
43023	–		Colne Valley Railway	Great Western Railway	Intercity Blue and Grey	Preserved	Preserved by 125 Heritage Ltd in March 2023
43024	–			Great Western Railway	First Great Western	Stored	
43025	–	“The Institution of Railway Operators”	125 Group	Great Western Railway	First Great Western	Preserved	Preserved by the 125 Group at Ruddington.
43026	–		ScotRail	Great Western Railway			Formerly City of Westminster and Michael Eavis.
43027	–	Acton Castle	Great Western Railway	Great Western Railway	First Great Western	Stored	Formerly Westminster Abbey and Glorious Devon. Withdrawn December 2023.
43028	–		ScotRail	Great Western Railway	ScotRail	In service	
43029	–	Caldicot Castle	Great Western Railway	Great Western Railway	First Great Western	Stored	Withdrawn December 2023.
43030	–			ScotRail	ScotRail	Scrapped	Scrapped after the Stonehaven derailment
43031	–		ScotRail	Great Western Railway	ScotRail	In service	
43032	–		ScotRail	Great Western Railway	ScotRail	In service	
43033	–		ScotRail	Great Western Railway	ScotRail	In service	Formerly Driver Brian Cooper.
43034	–		ScotRail	Great Western Railway	ScotRail	In service	
43035	–		ScotRail	Great Western Railway	ScotRail	In service	
43036	–		ScotRail	Great Western Railway	ScotRail	In service	
43037	–		ScotRail	Great Western Railway	ScotRail	In service	
43038	43238			East Midlands Railway	LNER all red	Stored	Formerly National Railway Museum 40 Years 1975-2015. Nameplate sold in 2020.
43039	43239			London North Eastern Railway CrossCountry	Crosscountry	In service	
43040	–	Berry Pomeroy Castle	Great Western Railway		Great Western Railway	In service	Vinyled in a Falklands 40 livery in June 2022.
43041	–	St Catherine's Castle		Great Western Railway	Great Western Railway	Scrapped	Withdrawn January 2023, used as a source of spares at Plymouth Laira depot. Sent for scrap at Sims Metal, Newport on 5 July 2023.
43042	–	Tregenna Castle	Great Western Railway		Great Western Railway	In service	
43043	–			East Midlands Railway	East Midlands Trains	Scrapped	Scrapped at Sims Metal, Newport, April 2023.
43044	–	Edward Paxman	125 Group	East Midlands Railway	InterCity Executive	Preserved	Purchased by the 125 Group in 2021. Is expected to have its original Valenta engine restored. Currently stored at the Nottingham Heritage Railway.
43045	–	The Doncaster School AD1450	125 Preservation	Colas Rail	East Midlands Trains	Preserved	Entered preservation at the Long Marston Rail Innovation Centre. Now at Railworld / NVR
43046	–	Geoff Drury 1930-1999; Steam Preservation and Computerised Track Recording Pioneer	Locomotive Services Limited	East Midlands Railway	Blue Pullman	Preserved	Blue Pullman livery.
43047	–		Locomotive Services Limited	East Midlands Railway	Blue Pullman	Preserved	
43048	–		125 Group	East Midlands Railway	East Midlands Trains	Preserved	Preserved at 125 Group. Formerly T.C.B. Miller MBE.
43049	–	Neville Hill	Locomotive Services Limited	East Midlands Railway	InterCity Swallow	Preserved	
43050	–			Colas Rail	East Midlands Trains	Stored	Stored at Long Marston.
43051	43251		Colas Rail	East Midlands Railway	LNER	In service	
43052	–			East Midlands Railway	East Midlands Trains	Scrapped	Awaiting scrapping at Kingsbury, September 2023
43053	–			Great Western Railway	First Great Western	Scrapped	Scrapped at Sims Metal, Newport by March 2023. Formerly University of Worcester.
43054	–			East Midlands Railway	East Midlands Trains	Stored, will most likely be scrapped in future	
43055	–		Locomotive Services Limited	East Midlands Railway	Blue Pullman	Preserved	Blue Pullman livery.
43056	–		Welsh Railways Trust	Great Western Railway	First Great Western	Preserved	Donated to the Welsh Railways Trust in 2021 and based at the Gwili Railway. Formerly Royal British Legion.
43057	43257		Colas Rail	East Midlands Railway	LNER	In service	Formerly Bounds Green. Nameplate sold in 2020.
43058	–		Locomotive Services Limited	East Midlands Railway	Rail Charter Services Green & Silver	Preserved	Painted green with a silver stripe in 2021.
43059	–		Locomotive Services Limited	East Midlands Railway	Rail Charter Services Green & Silver	Preserved	Painted green with a silver stripe in 2021.
43060	43200		125 Group	Colas Rail	Navy Blue 'Railway 200' Livery	Preserved	Preserved at 125 Group. Sports the 'Railway 200' logo to mark 200th anniversary of the modern railway and was presented at the Greatest Gathering.
43061	–			East Midlands Railway	East Midlands Trains	Scrapped	Scrapped at Sims Metal, Newport October 2021.
43062	–	John Armitt	Network Rail	Virgin CrossCountry	Network Rail Yellow	In service	Used for the New Measurement Train.
43063	–		Plym Valley Railway	Great Western Railway	InterCity Swallow	Preserved	Preserved at Plym Valley Railway. Repainted into InterCity Swallow livery.
43064	–			East Midlands Railway	East Midlands Trains	Scrapped	Scrapped at Sims Metal, Newport, April 2023.
43065	43465		RailAdventure	East Midlands Railway	RailAdventure	In service	Buffered.
43066	–			East Midlands Railway	East Midlands Trains	Stored	
43067	43467	Nottinghamshire Fire and Rescue Service; British Transport Police Nottingham	RailAdventure	East Midlands Railway	East Midlands Trains	Stored	Buffered. One name on each side. Named after the crews responding to the Nottingham station fire on 12 January 2018.
43068	43468		RailAdventure	East Midlands Railway	RailAdventure	In service	Buffered.
43069	–			Great Western Railway	First Great Western	Scrapped	Used as a spares donor for Great Western Railway's fleet of ‘Castle’ power cars at Plymouth Laira depot, taken for scrapping at Sims Metal, Newport on 31 May 2022.
43070	–			Great Western Railway	First Great Western	Scrapped	Scrapped at Sims Metal, Newport by March 2023.
43071	–		Colne Valley Railway	Great Western Railway	First Great Western	Preserved	Preserved by 125 Heritage in November 2021. Formerly 'Forward Birmingham' after the Exmouth-based Trent.
43072	43272		Colas Rail	East Midlands Railway	LNER	In service	Based at Derby R.T.C.
43073	–	Neville Hill HST Depot 42 Years	Colne Valley Railway	East Midlands Railway	East Midlands Trains	Preserved	Preserved by 125 Heritage in November 2021.
43074	43274		Colas Rail	East Midlands Railway	EMR Purple	In service	Formerly Spirit of Sunderland, nameplate sold in 2020. Based at Derby R.T.C.
43075	–			East Midlands Railway	East Midlands Trains	Scrapped	Scrapped at Sims Metal, Newport October 2021.
43076	–			East Midlands Railway	East Midlands Trains	Stored	
43077	43277	Safety Task Force	Colas Rail	LNER	Colas/Network Rail	In service	
43078	–			Great Western Railway	First Great Western	Stored	Stored at Laira.
43079	–			Great Western Railway	First Great Western	Scrapped	Scrapped at Sims Metal, Newport by March 2023.
43080	43480	West Hampstead PSB	RailAdventure	East Midlands Railway	RailAdventure	In service	Buffered, exported to Germany September 2021. Returned to Eastleigh in 2022.
43081	–		Crewe Heritage Centre	East Midlands Railway	East Midlands Trains	Preserved	Preserved at Crewe Heritage Centre.
43082	–		Colne Valley Railway	East Midlands Railway	East Midlands Trains	Preserved	The Railway Children Preserved by 125 Heritage Ltd in October 2021.
43083	–		Locomotive Services Limited	East Midlands Railway	East Midlands Trains	Preserved	
43084	43484		RailAdventure	East Midlands Railway	RailAdventure	In service	Buffered, exported to Germany September 2021. Returned to Eastleigh in 2022.
43085	43285		Colas Rail	CrossCountry	Crosscountry	In service	
43086	–			Great Western Railway	First Great Western	Stored	Stored at Laira
43087	–			Great Western Railway	First Great Western	Stored	Stored at Laira
43088	–	Dartmouth Castle		Great Western Railway	Great Western Railway	Stored	Withdrawn 8 May 2023, stored at Plymouth Laira depot.
43089	–		125 Group	East Midlands Railway	East Midlands Trains	Preserved	Previously Hayabusa diesel-battery hybrid testbed. Preserved at 125 Group.
43090	43290		Network Rail	East Midlands Railway	LNER	In service	Formerly MTU Fascination of Power, nameplate sold in 2020.
43091	–			Great Western Railway	First Great Western	Stored	Stored at Laira.
43092	–	Cromwell's Castle	Great Western Railway	Virgin CrossCountry	Great Western Railway	In service	Formerly Institue of Mechanical Engineers 150th Anniversary
43093	–	Berkeley Castle	Great Western Railway	Virgin CrossCountry	Great Western Railway	In service	Formerly Old Oak Common HST Depot 1976-2018
43094		St Mawes Castle	Great Western Railway	Virgin CrossCountry	Great Western Railway	In service	
43095	43295			East Midlands Railway	LNER	Stored	
43096	43296		RailAdventure	East Midlands Railway	East Midlands Trains	Stored	Stored. To be used as a spares donor.
43097	–	Castle Drogo	Great Western Railway	Virgin CrossCountry	Great Western Railway	In service	Formerly Environment Agency.
43098	–	Walton Castle	Great Western Railway	Virgin CrossCountry	Great Western Railway	In service	
43099	43299		Network Rail	East Midlands Railway	LNER	In service	
43100	43300		–	London North Eastern Railway	LNER	Stored	Damaged in a collision with 800109 at Neville Hill on 13 November 2019. Formerly named Craigentinny, nameplate sold in 2020.
43101	43301		Stored	CrossCountry; Virgin CrossCountry	Crosscountry		
43102	43302	The Journey Shrinker; 148.5 MPH The Worlds Fastest Diesel Train	National Railway Museum	East Midlands Railway	InterCity Swallow	Preserved	Along with 43159, 43102 (43302) holds the world record for the fastest diesel locomotive in the world. Repainted into InterCity Swallow livery in February 2021. Donated to the National Railway Museum after withdrawal from service in May 2021 and currently on display at Shildon.
43103	43303		CrossCountry	Virgin CrossCountry	Crosscountry		
43104	43304		CrossCountry	Midland Mainline	Crosscountry		
43105	43305		–	East Midlands Railway	LNER	Stored	
43106	43306		–	East Midlands Railway	LNER	Stored	
43107	43307		–	East Midlands Railway	LNER	Stored	
43108	43308		RailAdventure	East Midlands Railway	LNER	Stored	Stored. To be used as a spares donor. Formerly named BBC Television Railwatch and later named Highland Chieftain, nameplate auctioned in 2020.
43109	43309		–	East Midlands Railway	LNER	Stored	
43110	43310			East Midlands Railway	LNER	Stored	
43111	43311			London North Eastern Railway	LNER	Stored	
43112	43312			London North Eastern Railway	British Rail Blue & Grey	Stored	Used in LNER HST charily railtour along with 43206. Stored at Ely.
43113	43313			London North Eastern Railway	LNER	Scrapped	Damaged in a collision on 31 October 2019. Was previously stored for use as a source of spare parts for CrossCountry. Taken for scrapping at Sims Metal, Newport on 23 February 2022.
43114	43314			East Midlands Railway		Stored	
43115	43315			London North Eastern Railway		Stored	
43116	43316			East Midlands Railway		Stored	
43117	43317			East Midlands Railway		Stored	
43118	43318	Celebrating Forty Years		East Midlands Railway		Stored	
43119	43319			East Midlands Railway		Stored	
43120	43320			East Midlands Railway		Stored	
43121	43321		Colas Rail	CrossCountry	CrossCountry	In service	
43122	–	Dunster Castle	Great Western Railway	Virgin CrossCountry	Great Western Railway	Stored	Withdrawn December 2023.
43123	43423	Valenta 1972-2010	RailAdventure	East Midlands Railway	East Midlands Trains	In service	Buffered.
43124	–		ScotRail	Great Western Railway	ScotRail	In service	
43125	–		ScotRail	Great Western Railway	ScotRail	In service	
43126	–		ScotRail	Great Western Railway	ScotRail	In service	
43127	–		ScotRail	Great Western Railway	ScotRail	In service	
43128	–		ScotRail	Great Western Railway	ScotRail	In service	
43129	–		ScotRail	Great Western Railway	ScotRail	In service	
43130	–		ScotRail	Great Western Railway	ScotRail	In service	
43131	–		ScotRail	Great Western Railway	ScotRail	In service	
43132	–		ScotRail	Great Western Railway	ScotRail	In service	
43133	–		ScotRail	Great Western Railway	ScotRail	In service	
43134	–	Gordon Aikman BEM	ScotRail	Great Western Railway	ScotRail	In service	Named in June 2021.
43135	–		ScotRail	Great Western Railway	ScotRail	In service	
43136	–		ScotRail	Great Western Railway	ScotRail	In service	
43137	–		ScotRail	Great Western Railway	ScotRail	In service	
43138	–		ScotRail	Great Western Railway	ScotRail	In service	
43139	–		ScotRail	Great Western Railway	ScotRail	In service	Formerly Driver Stan Martin.
43140	–		–	ScotRail	Abellio Scotrail	Scrapped	Scrapped after the Stonehaven derailment.
43141	–		ScotRail	Great Western Railway	ScotRail	In service	
43142	–		ScotRail	Great Western Railway	ScotRail	In service	
43143	–		ScotRail	Great Western Railway	ScotRail	In service	
43144	–		ScotRail	Great Western Railway	ScotRail	In service	
43145	–		ScotRail	Great Western Railway	ScotRail	In service	
43146	–		ScotRail	Great Western Railway	ScotRail	In service	
43147	–		ScotRail	Great Western Railway	ScotRail	In service	
43148	–		ScotRail	Great Western Railway	ScotRail	In service	
43149	–		ScotRail	Great Western Railway	ScotRail	In service	
43150	–		ScotRail	Great Western Railway	ScotRail	In service	
43151	–		ScotRail	Great Western Railway	ScotRail	In service	Formerly known as Blue Peter II.
43152	–		ScotRail	Great Western Railway	ScotRail	In service	
43153	–		Great Western Railway	Virgin CrossCountry	Great Western Railway	Stored	Formerly Chûn Castle and The English Riviera. Withdrawn December 2023.
43154	–	Compton Castle	Great Western Railway	Virgin CrossCountry	Great Western Railway	Stored	Withdrawn December 2023.
43155	–	Rougemont Castle	Great Western Railway	Virgin CrossCountry	Great Western Railway	Stored	Formerly The Red Arrows. Withdrawn December 2023.
43156	–	Maen Castle	Great Western Railway	Virgin CrossCountry	Great Western Railway	In service	Formerly Dartington International Summer School
43157	43357		Colas Rail	CrossCountry	CrossCountry	In service	
43158		Kingswear Castle		Great Western Railway	Great Western Railway	Exported	Withdrawn 11 May 2023. Exported to Mexico in August 2023.
43159	–		125 Group	Great Western Railway	InterCity Executive	Preserved	Donated to the 125 Group in 2021, operational as of 2026. Along with 43102 (43302), 43159 holds the world record for the fastest diesel locomotive in the world.
43160	–	Castle-an-Dinas		Great Western Railway	Great Western Railway	Stored	Withdrawn 18 February 2023, stored at Plymouth Laira depot. Formerly named 'Storm Force' after the RNLI club for children.
43161	-			Great Western Railway	First Great Western	Scrapped	Scrapped at Plym Valley Railway. Previously stored at Laira for use as spare donor.
43162	–		Great Western Railway	Virgin CrossCountry	Great Western Railway	Stored	Formerly Caerhays Castle Withdrawn December 2023.
43163	–		ScotRail	Great Western Railway	ScotRail	In Service	Involved in the Southall Rail Crash.
43164	–		ScotRail	Great Western Railway	ScotRail	In Service	
43165	–		Colne Valley Railway	Great Western Railway	First Great Western	Preserved	Preserved at the Colne Valley Railway in Halstead, Essex. Previously stored at Ely Papworth sidings.
43166	43366	HST 40; Celebrating 40 years of High Speed Train services on the CrossCountry Network	Stored	Midland Mainline CrossCountry	CrossCountry	stored	
43167	43367		–	London North Eastern Railway	LNER	Stored	Formerly Deltic 50 1965-2005.
43168	–		ScotRail	Great Western Railway	ScotRail	In service	
43169	–		ScotRail	Great Western Railway	ScotRail	In service	
43170	–	Chepstow Castle		Great Western Railway	Great Western Railway	Stored	Withdrawn 20 May 2023. Stored at Ely. Exported to Mexico in August 2023 as FIT3007.
43171	–	Raglan Castle		Great Western Railway	Great Western Railway	Scrapped	Withdrawn 20 May 2023. Sent for scrap at Sims Metal, Newport on 6 July 2023.
43172	–	Tiverton Castle	Great Western Railway		Great Western Railway	In service	Formerly Harry Patch.
43173	–		–	Great Western Trains	Great Western Trains 'Merlin'	Scrapped	Scrapped after the Southall Rail Crash.
43174	–		–	Great Western Railway	First Great Western	Stored	Scrapped
43175	–		ScotRail	Great Western Railway	ScotRail	In service	
43176	–		ScotRail	Great Western Railway	ScotRail	In service	
43177	–		ScotRail	Great Western Railway	ScotRail	In service	
43178	43378		Stored	Midland Mainline CrossCountry	Crosscountry	In service	
43179	–		ScotRail	Great Western Railway	ScotRail	In service	
43180	–		–	Great Western Railway	First Great Western	Scrapped	Moved to Sims Metal, Newport on 2 February 2023.
43181	–		ScotRail	Great Western Railway	ScotRail	In service	
43182	–		ScotRail	Great Western Railway	ScotRail	In service	
43183	–		ScotRail	Great Western Railway	ScotRail	In service	
43184	43384	Laira Diesel Depot	Stored	Midland Mainline CrossCountry	InterCity Executive	In service	Painted in current livery in 2022. Displays unit number 253051 and original vehicle number 43184.
43185	–		–	Great Western Railway	InterCity Swallow	Stored	Formerly Great Western.
43186	–	Taunton Castle	Great Western Railway		Great Western Railway	In service	
43187	–	Cardiff Castle / Y Cymro The Welshman	Great Western Railway		Great Western Railway	In service	
43188	–	Newport Castle / Y Cymro The Welshman / Geraint Thomas	Great Western Railway		Great Western Railway	In service	
43189	–	Launceston Castle	Great Western Railway		Great Western Railway	In service	
43190	–		–	Great Western Railway	First Great Western	Stored	Intended to become spare parts donor for 125 Group’s HST fleet. Stored at Mid-Norfolk Railway.
43191	–		Great Western Railway		First Great Western	Scrapped	
43192	–	Trematon Castle	Great Western Railway	-	Great Western Railway	In service	
43193	–		–	Great Western Railway	First Great Western	Scrapped	Used as a spares donor for Great Western Railway's fleet of ‘Castle’ power cars at Plymouth Laira depot, taken for scrapping at Sims Metal, Newport on 31 May 2022.
43194	–	Okehampton Castle	Great Western Railway	Virgin CrossCountry	Great Western Railway	Stored	Withdrawn December 2023.
43195	–		–	Great Western Railway	First Great Western	Scrapped	Stored as a source of spare parts at Plymouth Laira after hitting a tree. Moved to Sims Metal, Newport on 1 February 2023.
43196	–		Great Western Railway	Virgin CrossCountry	Great Western Railway	Stored at Laira	
43197	–		–	Great Western Railway	First Great Western	Scrapped	Used as a spares donor for Great Western Railway's fleet of ‘Castle’ power cars at Plymouth Laira depot, taken for scrapping at Sims Metal, Newport on 31 May 2022.
43198	–	Driver Brian Cooper 15 June 1947 - 5 October 1999; Driver Stan Martin 25 June 1950 - 6 November 2004.	Great Western Railway	Virgin CrossCountry	Great Western Railway	In service	One name on each side. Formerly Oxfordshire 2007.
