= British Rail Class 43 (HST) =

British high speed diesel locomotive

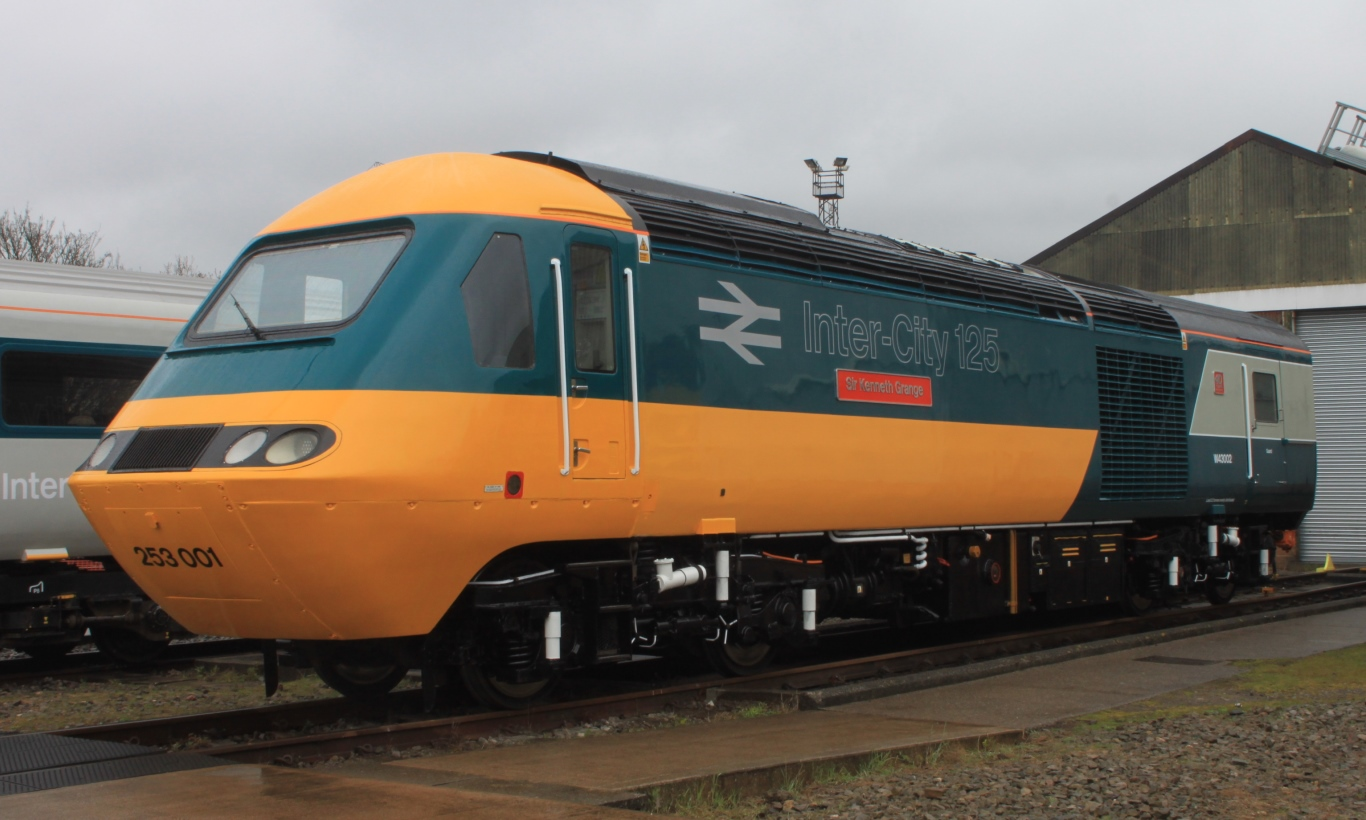
- Power car 43002 Sir Kenneth Grange at St Philip's Marsh depot, Bristol in 2016
Type and origin
- Power type: Diesel-electric
- Builder: British Rail Engineering Limited Crewe Works
- Build date: 1975–1982
- Total produced: 197
Specifications
- Configuration
  - UIC: Bo′Bo′
  - Commonwealth: Bo-Bo
- Gauge: 1,435 mm (4 ft 8 1/2 in) standard gauge
- Bogies: BP10
- Wheel diameter: 3 ft 4 in (1.016 m)
- Length: 17.79 metres (58.4 ft)
- Width: 2.74 metres (9.0 ft)
- Loco weight: 70.25 tonnes (69.14 long tons; 77.44 short tons)
- Fuel capacity: 990 imp gal (4,500 L; 1,190 US gal)
- Prime mover: Paxman VP185; MTU 16V4000 R41R; Paxman Valenta 12RP200L
- Alternator: Valenta, VP185: Brush Traction BA1001B; MTU: Brush Traction BA1001C
- Traction motors: GEC G417AZ (43124-43152); Brush Traction TMH68-46; Both frame mounted, four off.
- Transmission: Engine driven alternator and rectifier supplying DC to traction motors
- MU working: Within class only
- Train heating: Electric Train Heat
- Train brakes: Air
- Safety systems: AWS; TPWS; ETCS (Note: Power cars 43013–43014 and 43062 only, as part of 'first in class' testing for the East Coast Main Line digital signalling programme.)
Performance figures
- Maximum speed: 125 mph (201 km/h)
- Power output: Engine: 2,250 hp (1,678 kW); At rail: 1,770 bhp (1,320 kW)
- Tractive effort: Maximum: 17,980 lbf (80.0 kN); Continuous: 10,340 lbf (46.0 kN)
- Brakeforce: 35 long tons-force (349 kN)
Career
- Operators: Current: ScotRail Trains (since 2022); Tren Interoceánico (since 2023); Network Rail (since 2003); Colas Rail (since 2020); RailAdventure (since 2022); Future: First Metro; Previous: British Rail (1976–1997); Great Western Trains (1996–1998); Virgin Trains West Coast (1997–2004); Virgin CrossCountry (1997–2003, 2005); Midland Mainline (1996–2007); Cotswold Rail (2000–2010); GNER (1996–2007); Great Western Railway (1998-2025); National Express East Coast (2007–2009); East Coast (2009–2015); Virgin Trains East Coast (2015–2018); London North Eastern Railway (2018–2019); Grand Central (2007–2017); East Midlands Trains (2007–2019); Hull Trains (2019); East Midlands Railway (2019–2021); Abellio ScotRail (2018–2022); CrossCountry (2007-2023)
- Numbers: 43002–43198
- Axle load class: Route Availability 5

The British Rail Class 43 (HST) is the TOPS classification used for the InterCity 125 High Speed Train (formerly Classes 253 and 254) diesel-electric power cars, built by British Rail Engineering Limited from 1975 to 1982, and in service in the UK since 1976.

The class is officially the fastest diesel locomotive in the world, with an absolute maximum speed of 148.5 mph (239.0 km/h), and a regular service speed of 125 mph (201 km/h). The record run was led by 43102 (43302) and trailed by 43159.

== History and development ==
=== Background ===
In the early 1970s, the British Railways Board made the decision to replace its main-line express diesel traction. Financial limitations were tight, so mass electrification was not possible. As a result, a new generation of high-speed diesel trains had to be developed.

Experience with the high-speed Class 55 Deltic locomotives had shown that a low axle weight was essential to avoid damage to the track at sustained high speed, with sufficient power-to-weight ratio for a high speed train. Gas turbines had been considered as an alternative powerplant for the type but they were costly, were fuel hungry and also had high maintenance requirements and were thus ruled out in favour of a more conventional pair of diesel engines. To power the HST at up to 125 mph (201 km/h), an arrangement of two medium-power diesel engines was opted for instead. It was not possible to position both engines within a single power car due to the low axle weight required, hence a pair of power cars, each equipped with a single engine, were used instead. The power car had a design weight limitation of 70 tonnes: to fulfil this required the use of lightweight equipment that still satisfied the necessary levels of strength, reliability, and reasonable affordability to accommodate the high planned utilisation rate for these vehicles; the 70-tonne weight of the power car achieved a 17.5-tonne axle loading.

It was designed by the British Railways Board Chief Mechanical & Electrical Engineer's Department at the Railway Technical Centre in Derby in collaboration with British Rail Research Division and various equipment manufacturers. Principal manufacture was performed by British Rail Engineering Limited (BREL); specifically, while the power cars were produced at Crewe Works, the accompanying trailer cars were built at Derby Litchurch Lane Works in Derby.

=== Prototype ===
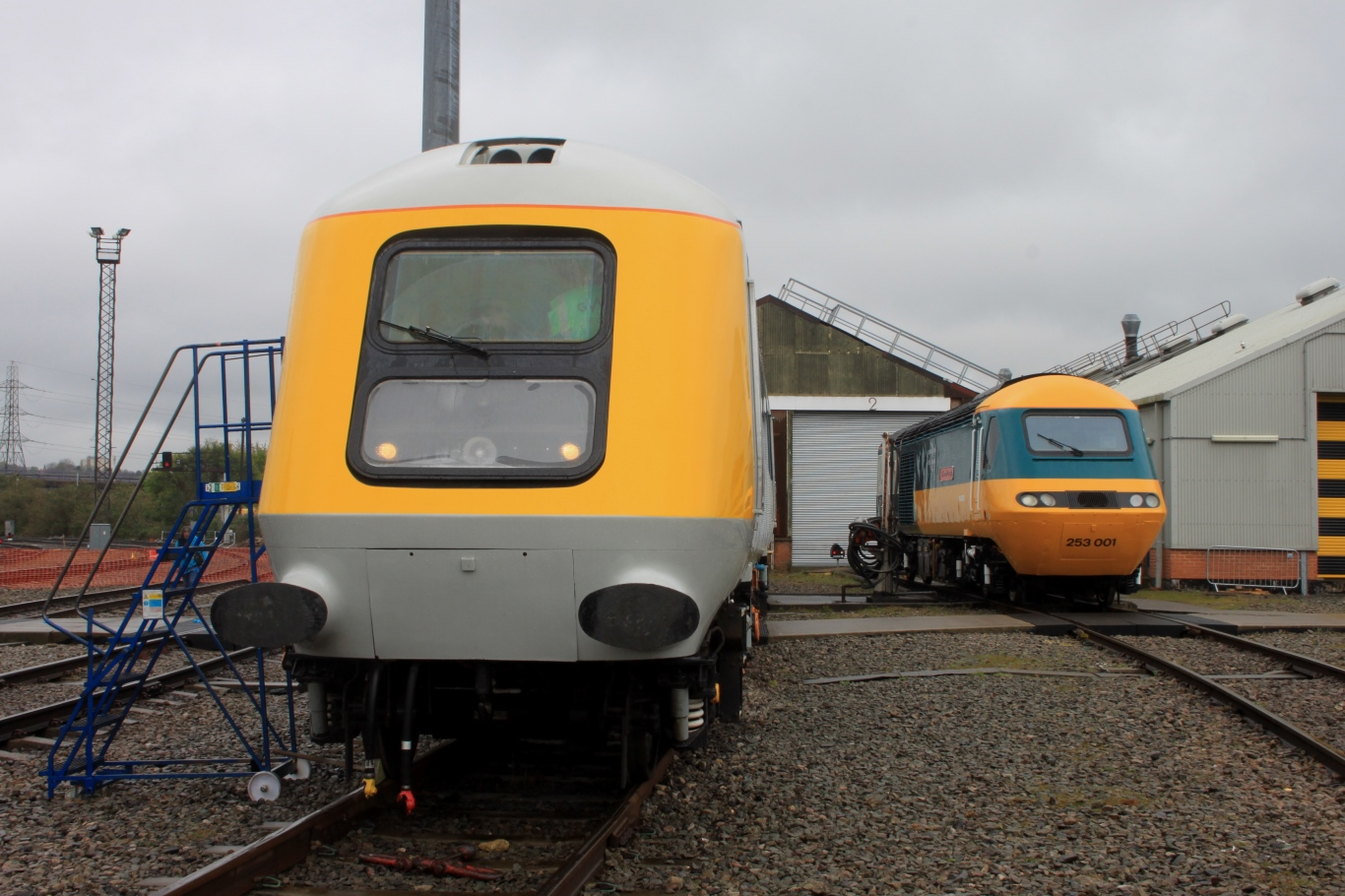
Prototype power car 41001 (left) with first production power car 43002

To validate the design, a prototype set was produced. The engine used in the prototype power cars was the Paxman 'Valenta' 12RP200L, which developed 2,250 horsepower (1,680 kW). Despite being placed at opposing ends of the train, the two power cars were connected to one another via cables that ran the length of the train, permitting the leading cab to exercise effective control of both power cars. Each power car had a main driver's position at one aerodynamically shaped end with the other flat and gangwayed end having only an auxiliary driving position for shunting purposes.

The two prototype power cars emerged from Crewe Works in June and August 1972 and were initially numbered 41001 and 41002, but after a short period the entire set, including the passenger coaches, became reclassified as a diesel-electric multiple unit: British Rail Class 252. The power cars were given the coaching stock numbers 43000 and 43001. After proving trials on the Eastern Region the prototype High Speed Diesel Train (HSDT) was transferred to the Western Region, where it was deployed on Paddington – Bristol – Weston-super-Mare services.

=== Production series ===
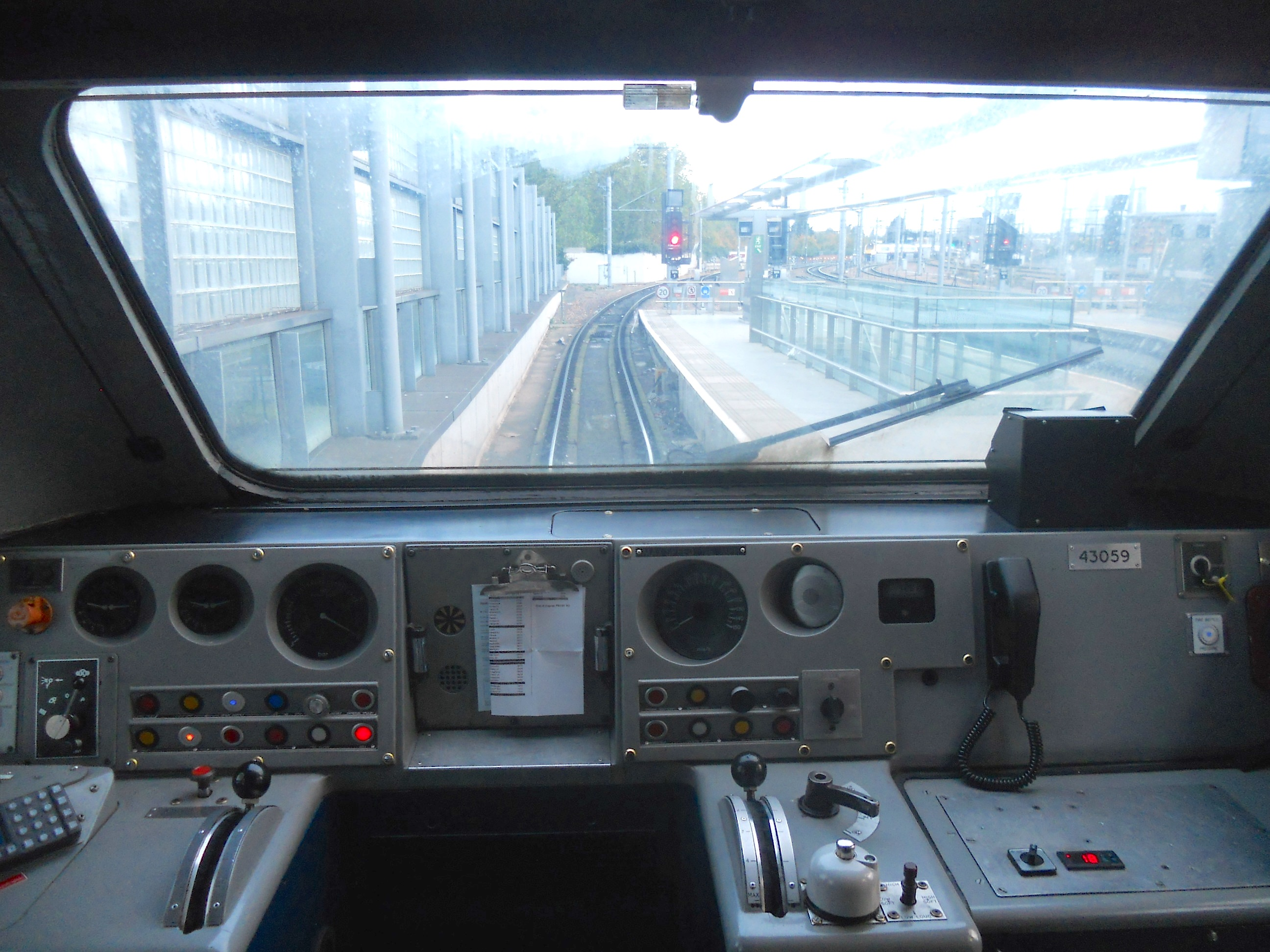
The driver's cab and controls aboard a Class 43 power car

The design was successful and led to production orders being placed for similar trains for the Western, Eastern, Scottish and London Midland regions. The production power cars featured a redesigned front end without conventional buffers, although a rigid drawbar can be used to connect an HST to an ordinary locomotive. Following the introduction of production HST sets, the prototype unit was withdrawn, the power cars passing to the Research Division at Derby. Of the ten prototype coaches, two were adapted for use in the Royal Train, five were modified for use with the production HSTs, and three were transferred to Departmental stock.

The 197 power cars produced are numbered 43002-43198. 43001 was applied to the second of the two prototype power cars, while the first of the pair (now preserved at the NRM; formerly operational on the GCR) became 43000, which is unusual because BR TOPS classification numbered its locomotives from 001 upwards (this was because it was not, at the time, classified as a locomotive).

=== Buffered units ===
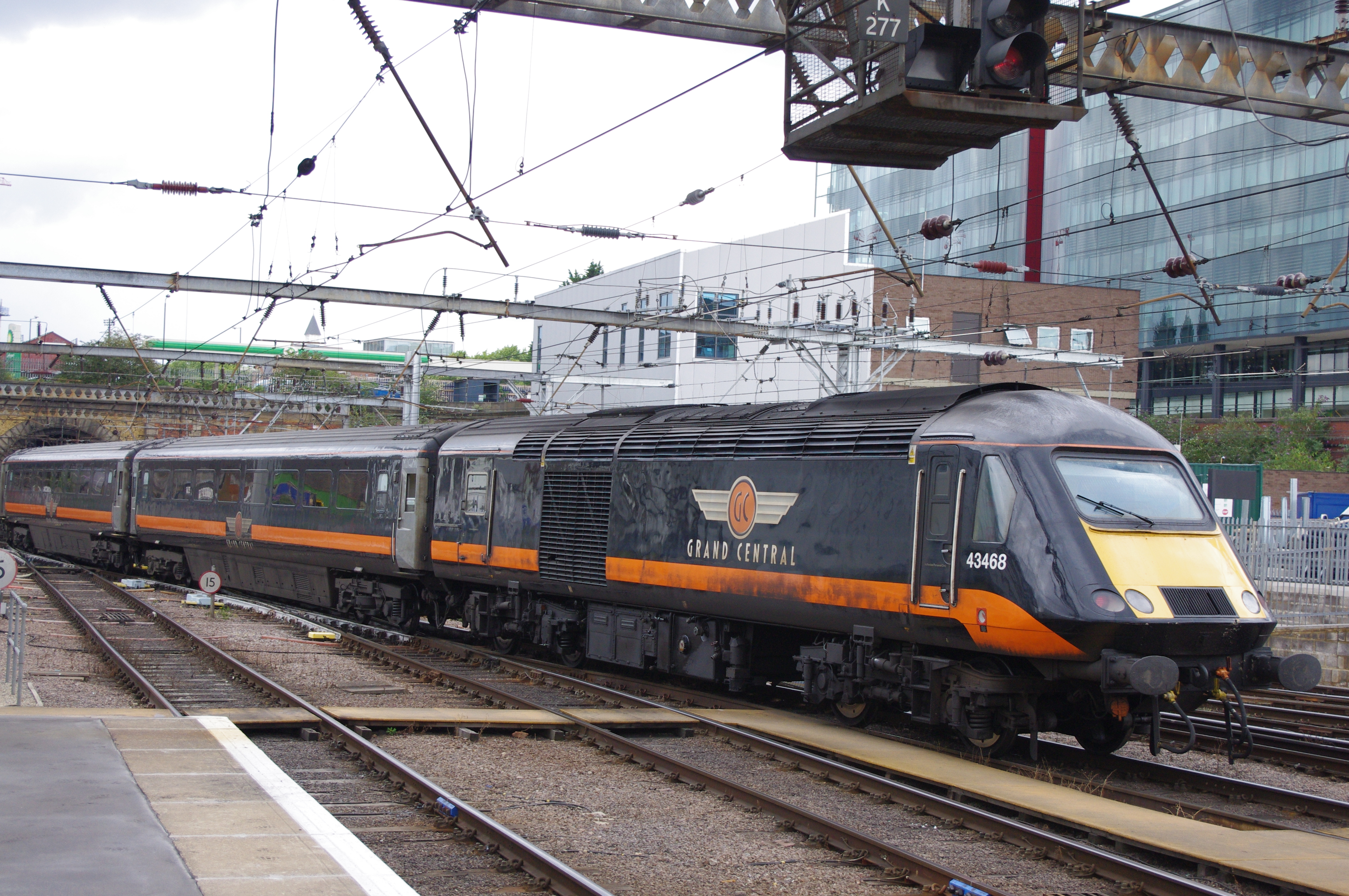
43468 departs London King's Cross in 2011

In 1987, as electrification of the East Coast Main Line was under way, British Rail realised that the new Mark 4 carriages for the Class 89 and Class 91 locomotives were not going to be finished in time for the introduction of electric services on the East Coast Main Line so, in late 1987, a total of eight Eastern Region power car conversions were carried out at the Derby Engineering Development Unit, whilst the other six were converted by the diesel repair shop at Stratford to have the lower valancing removed and buffers fitted.

After being fitted with buffers, these power cars began work as surrogate DVTs to work with the Class 91s and 89. The locomotives, working with conventional Mark 3 stock, worked on the line between 1987 and 1991, when the last Class 91 locomotives entered service. As well as buffers being fitted to these power cars, special remote control equipment was also added to the locomotives so they could be controlled by the locomotive at the front. Once these locomotives left DVT duties, the remote equipment was removed.

After privatisation, these power cars joined the Virgin Trains fleet working both Virgin CrossCountry and Virgin Trains West Coast routes, where they displaced loco-hauled stock. All the units were repainted from their original InterCity colours to the Virgin red livery. Later, Virgin Trains withdrew the HSTs when new Class 220 and 221 units were delivered, and nearly all of these power cars went into storage at Long Marston.

After years of storage, several of the power cars were bought by Midland Mainline to be part of Project Rio, special services running from London St Pancras to Manchester while major engineering works were undertaken on the West Coast Main Line. These units were kept in the de-branded Virgin Trains livery throughout their time with Midland Mainline and put back in storage once Project Rio had finished in 2006.

Two units joined Network Rail's New Measurement Train in 2003 and have continued to work with this service ever since. Both of these units have now had MTU engines fitted.

One unit was leased to GNER as a one-off power car, working as a spare unit that could be easily called for if an HST failed. For most of its time with GNER, it was based at Craigentinny yard in Edinburgh and was painted into GNER colours. This locomotive's lease ended in 2006 and it was returned to storage at Long Marston.

In 2007, Grand Central took an interest in the stored power cars and amalgamated them into its fleet of three HST sets. In total, six were bought by the company and ran high-speed services between Sunderland and London Kings Cross. Two were the final operational Paxman Valenta power cars, being re-engined in 2010 with the MTU treatment. While at the works being re-engined, Grand Central added the orange stripe that appears on its Class 180 units, re-painted the front ends (making them look more like the non-buffered HSTs), and re-numbered the power cars into the four-hundreds. They were withdrawn from Grand Central service in 2017 after more Class 180s were acquired.

=== Engines ===
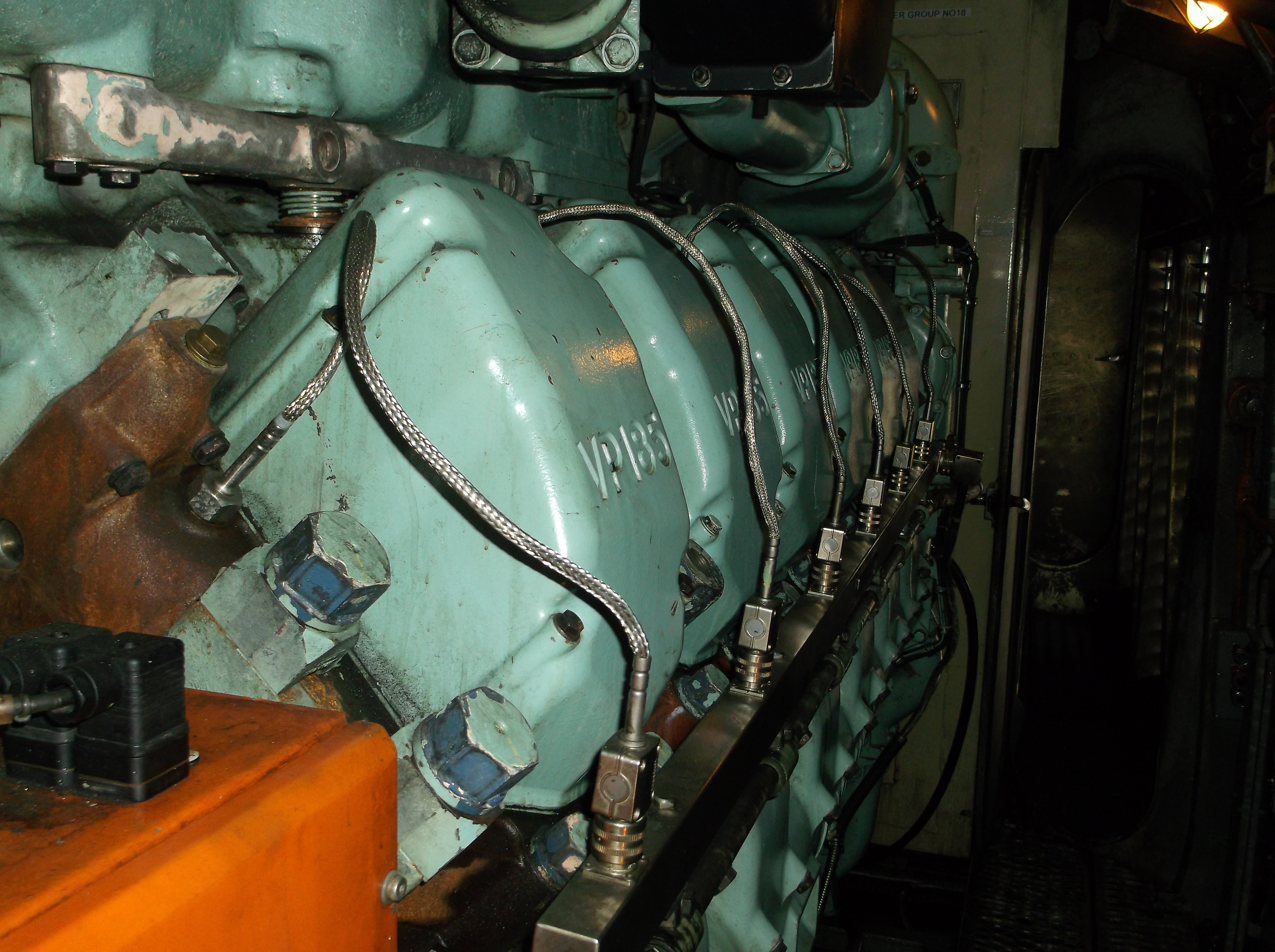
Paxman VP185 engine in a Class 43 of East Midlands Trains

Video of a GWR High Speed Train with MTU engines

British Rail experimented with Mirrlees Blackstone MB190 engines in four Western region examples (43167–43170) between 1987 and 1996, but this experiment was unsuccessful and the standard Paxman Valenta engines re-installed.

Paxman began development of the Valenta's successor, the Paxman VP185, in 1987. The suggestion that British Rail participate in a trial of the new VP185 engine in the IC125 was first mooted in January 1991, and a formal agreement for the trial was signed in May 1993.

A qualifying requirement for the trial was that the engine should undergo a British Rail Type Test which was carried out between December 1993 and February 1994. The test involved completion of 3,000 cycles, each of 10 minutes duration, with four minutes at the maximum power of 2,611 kW (3,501 bhp) and six minutes at idle, simulating the typical 'on-off' nature of IC125 duty. The test was much more severe than operational duty, where the train operates at a maximum of 1,678 kW (2,250 bhp). The successful results of the test cleared the way for installation of a VP185 in Power Car 43170 at Plymouth Laira Depot for in-service trials in the summer of 1994. Power car 43170 entered service on 22 September 1994. 43170 was given the nameplate "Edward Paxman".

During the late 1990s twenty-five HST power cars were re-engined with Paxman VP185 engines in order to improve fuel consumption and reduce emissions.

The last VP185 engine to be manufactured at Paxman's Colchester Works was despatched from the factory on 15 September 2003 as part of a programme to convert 14 Midland Mainline power cars to VP185 engines to supplement the four already converted during 1994/95, and this led to 43043/045/048-050/052/055/060/061/072/073/076/082 joining 43047/059/074/075 with this engine type.

Today there are no production power cars fitted with a Paxman Valenta engine, although the 125 Group have reinstalled a Paxman Valenta in the surviving prototype power car, 41001 (formerly 43000). The 125 Group are also in the process of reinstalling an operational Valenta into 43044, which has been given the nameplate Edward Paxman in commemoration.

=== Diesel-battery hybrid trial ===
In 2007, Brush Traction and Hitachi equipped Paxman Valenta powered 43089 and a semi-permanently coupled Mark 3 coach with a diesel-battery hybrid power system for experimental trials. The power car was named "Hayabusa" (Hayabusa, はやぶさ, Japanese for Peregrine falcon, project name 'V-Train 2'). It returned to normal service with East Midlands Trains.

== Design ==
The body structure of the Class 43 comprises integral all welded, mild steel construction across both the underframe and the stressed skin bodyside. This structure was optimised using computer aided design and finite element analysis. Material thickness varies from 10 mm (0.39 in) across the majority of the underframe to 2.5 mm (0.098 in) on the bodyside frame pressings and 2 mm (0.079 in) for the bodyside skin. The body was internally divided by a pair of transverse bulkheads, one at the rear of the driver's cab and the other at the forward end of the luggage compartment; a self-draining sealing plate floor was installed between these bulkheads that collected any spillage within a tank located beneath the underframe. All of the air intakes are positioned as high as possible and fitted with disposable dry filters where deemed to be necessary. A secondary bulkhead separated the engine from the clear air compartment, in which the electrical apparatus, control and brake equipment were housed.

The cab is a monocoque demountable unit furnished with a streamlined nose that was directly mounted on the underframe. The individual inner and outer skins are composed of glass reinforced polyester that, in combination with a polyurethane foam core, forms a high strength to weight composite structure. In comparison with legacy traction, the crew environment was improved in multiple respects, including a reduction in noise levels and protection from minor impacts even at high speeds. The ergonomics of both the driving position and controls were intentionally designed though anthropometric data that sought to facilitate precise control and minimise driver fatigue. The cab is air conditioned to maintain a temperature between 20 and 22 °C (68 and 72 °F). A door in the cab bulkhead provides access to the electrical compartment, engine room and cooling units, which can be traversed to reach to the luggage compartment and guard's compartment, which is able to be locked to form a security compartment. A through vestibule provides access to the rest of the train. For additional maintenance access, the roof is outfitted with removable sections of aluminium and GRP.

Each powercar was powered by a single Paxman Valenta 12 cylinder 4-stroke diesel engine. It had a maximum continuous rated output of 1,500 rpm and developed up to 2,250 bhp (1,680 kW). The Valenta engine had been developed from the preceding Ventura that had been used to power various forms of rail traction since 1958. The direct-driven alternator set was directly mounted to the engine while the complete power unit was mounted on the underframe. The combustion air was filtered and ducted to the engine's turbocharger. The fuel oil, sufficient to cover a distance of 2,300 km (1,400 mi) was stored within tanks beneath the underframe, was filtered, de-aerated and water-separated. The engine was also fitted with a conventional exhaust pipe and silencer; a roof mounted scavenging fan ventilates the engine room. Electric power was produced by a three-phase alternator set, built by Brush, was rated for an engine output of 1,868 kW (2,505 hp); the primary alternator achieved a rectified output of 1,484 kW (1,990 hp) at 1,500 rpm. An auxiliary alternator, which supplied power to the train, air conditioning, kitchen, and other auxiliary equipment, was also present. Each power car featured four frame-mounted traction motors, each of which had its own 3-point suspension on the bogie frame; this arrangement necessitated a flexible drive between the traction motor and the axle mounted gearbox to accomidate axle movement.

A twin-circuit aluminium alloy cooling unit, designed by Voith and produced by Marston Excelsior, cooled the water of the engine jacket, combustion air and lubricating oil systems. The single fan is driven by a shaft from the engine via a bevel gearbox and thermostatically controlled fluid coupling, both of which are cooled by Marston heat exchangers. Mechanically-driven pumps are used for coolant circulation. Particular attention was dedicated paid to achieving a leak-proof system; this led to the use of flanged hoses and simplified pipe runs where practical to do so while the cooling water contains both anti-freeze and corrosion-inhibiting agents. Each power car was provisioned with a pair of 5.4 kg (12 lb) portable fire extinguishers as well as fixed fire fighting installations that acted to protect key equipment within the car body against fire hazards. Specifically, this installation used a 18.2 kg (40 lb) bottle of bromochlorodifluoromethane (BCF) that was discharged via a distribution pipe network; actuation was achieved via pull handles situated in the driver's cab and on the bodyside. Furthermore, an automatic fire detection and alarm system was present; this consisted of heat detectors, a test button and an alarm bell.

The bogie features a welded mild steel frame and was furnished with monobloc wheels. It was equipped with disc brakes (which comprised cast iron cheek plates) and radius links (to guide the axleboxes). Coil springs were used for the primary suspension while 'flexicoil' springs were used for secondary suspension; hydraulic dampeners controlled both the primary and secondary suspension along with lateral movements and high frequency bogie rotation. Pre-compressed rubber elements and a pivot casting were used to control forces from both traction and braking. The electrically-controlled automatic air brake system, which was distributed across the whole train, conformed to BR's standard 2 pipe arrangement; despite this, it was able to bring the HST to a halt in less distance than contemporary locomotives travelling at only 100 mph (160 km/h). Wheel slide prevention apparatus was also fitted upon all axles while cast iron tread conditioning brakes acted upon each wheel during brake application to maintain rail/wheel adhesion.

== Life extension ==
The HST fleet, having been in operation since the late 1970s, has been largely replaced by the Intercity Express Programme.

- During 2005, two Class 43 power cars (43004 and 43009) operated by First Great Western were fitted with new MTU V16 4000 engines before being tested in passenger operation on the Great Western Line. In December 2005, First announced that all its power cars would receive the MTU engine. The MTU engine offers improvements over the existing Paxman 12RP200 'Valenta' engines, with reduced noise, smoke and exhaust emissions, improved reliability and fuel efficiency.
- National Express East Coast also re-engined its fleet with MTU engines, a process begun under its predecessor GNER. East Coast's fleet of re-engined power cars have been renumbered into the 432xx and 433xx series by adding 200 to the existing power car number.
- East Midlands Trains stated that it would install Paxman VP185 engines in all its power cars before the end of its franchise. It has since completed this operation, though the re-engined power cars retain their original numbers
- Grand Central had fitted its HST fleet with MTU engines. The first pair entered service on 21 September 2010; they have also been repainted with an orange stripe to match Grand Central's Class 180s. 43123 was the final Valenta power car; it now carries a plaque reading "Valenta 1972-2010". The final passenger service of a Valenta-engined power car was on 19 December 2010. On 22 December 2010 the Valenta was used in four farewell tours between York and Sunderland using 43123. All power cars have been re-engined by Brush Traction, Loughborough, and have been renumbered in the 43/4 range.
- CrossCountry's first CrossCountry-liveried HST power car, 43301 (formerly 43101) was released from its overhaul at Brush Traction, Loughborough on 16 July 2008. CrossCountry also renumbered all its HST units by adding 200 to the old number.
- In 2003, Network Rail launched its New Measurement Train, a specially converted InterCity 125 set. Its yellow livery has earned it the nickname "The Flying Banana".

== Operations ==
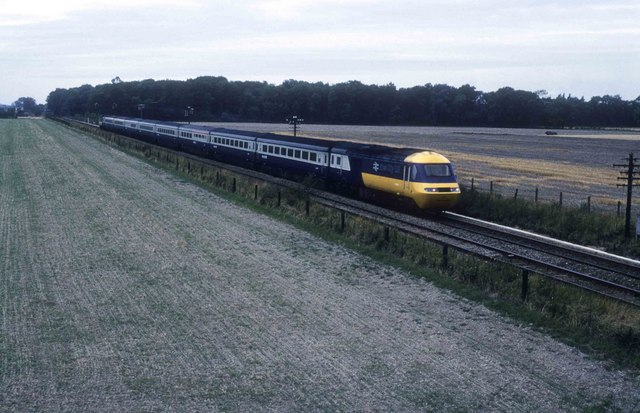
An eight-car East Coast Main Line set in 1979

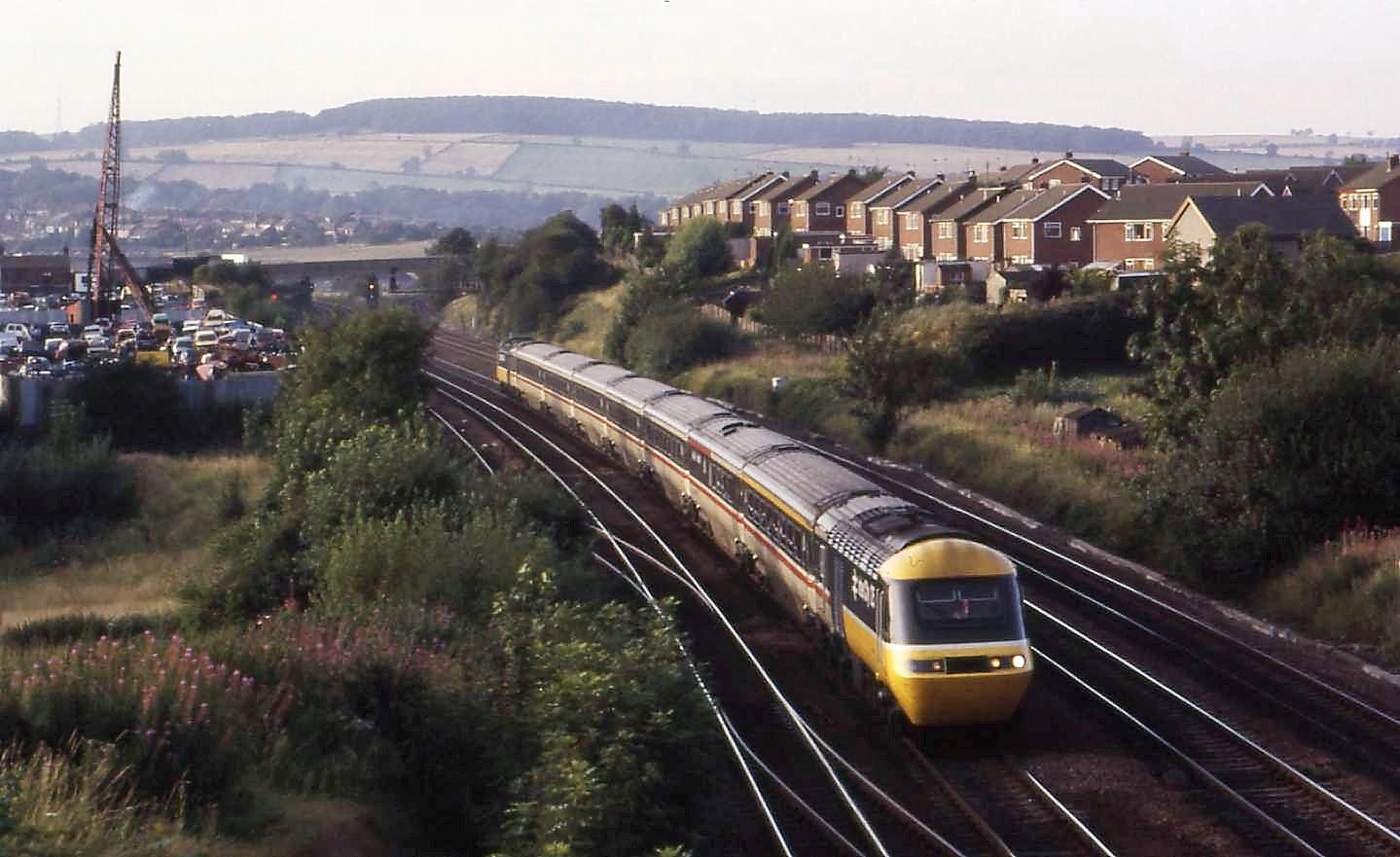
A seven-car Cross Country set in the 1980s

When Crewe Works built them, the InterCity 125 units were considered to be diesel multiple units, and were allocated Classes 253 and 254 for Western and Eastern Region services respectively. The locomotives were introduced in the Midland region later.

Until the HST's introduction, the maximum speed of British trains was limited to 100 mph (160 km/h). The increased speed and rapid acceleration and deceleration of the HST made it ideal for passenger use, and it slashed journey times around the country. The prototype InterCity 125 (power cars 43000 and 43001) set the world record for diesel traction at 143 mph (230 km/h) on 12 June 1973. An HST also holds the world speed record for a diesel train carrying passengers. On 27 September 1985, a special press run for the launch of a new Tees-Tyne Pullman service from Newcastle to London King's Cross, formed of a shortened 2+5 set, briefly touched 144 mph (232 km/h) north of York.

During 1987, eight HST power cars were converted for use as driving van trailers (DVTs) with Class 91 locomotives during trials on the East Coast Main Line. The power cars were fitted with buffers and time-division multiplex equipment that allowed them to directly control a Class 91, and were moved over to the ECML where they were used on workings with Class 89 and then Class 91 locomotives from London to Leeds. After the Mk 4 stock had been delivered, the HST power cars had the TDM equipment removed, and then reverted to their normal duties. The power cars used for this project can be easily identified as they are still fitted with buffers. They were then transferred to Virgin Cross Country, and put in storage when Virgin replaced its HST fleet with Bombardier Voyagers (though Arriva, upon later taking over the franchise, acquired ten power cars, four of which were buffered). Grand Central bought six of these for services from Sunderland to London, the remaining two having been integrated into Network Rail's New Measurement Train.

After the privatisation of British Rail the HST sets continued to be used. 193 of the 197 locomotives built remained in service, five power cars, 43173, 43011, 43019, 43140 and 43030, having been written off by fatal rail accidents in 1997, 1999, 2004 and 2020 respectively.

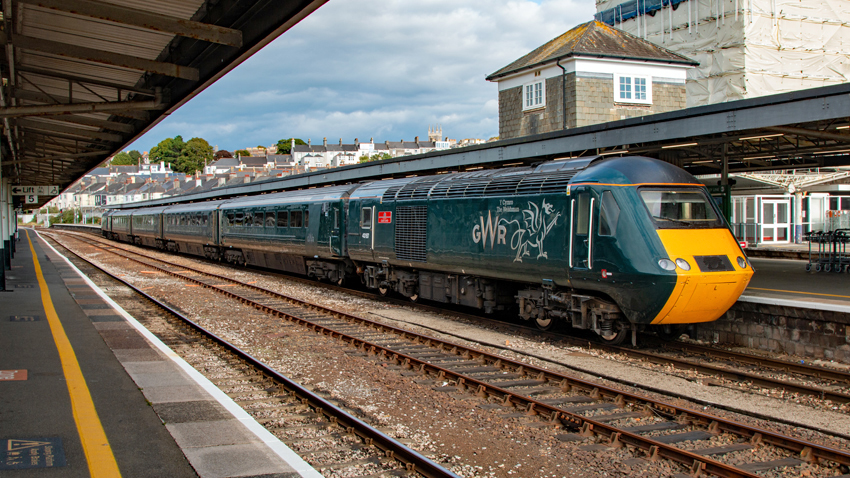
GWR Castle HST set at Plymouth

In 2018-19, Great Western Railway and London North Eastern Railway replaced their HST-worked services with ones operated by Class 800/801/802s. LNER retained none of its HSTs; GWR retained 24 power cars to form 11 four-carriage formations known as "Castle Class" sets for use on local services between Cardiff and Penzance, which had not been worked by HSTs before.

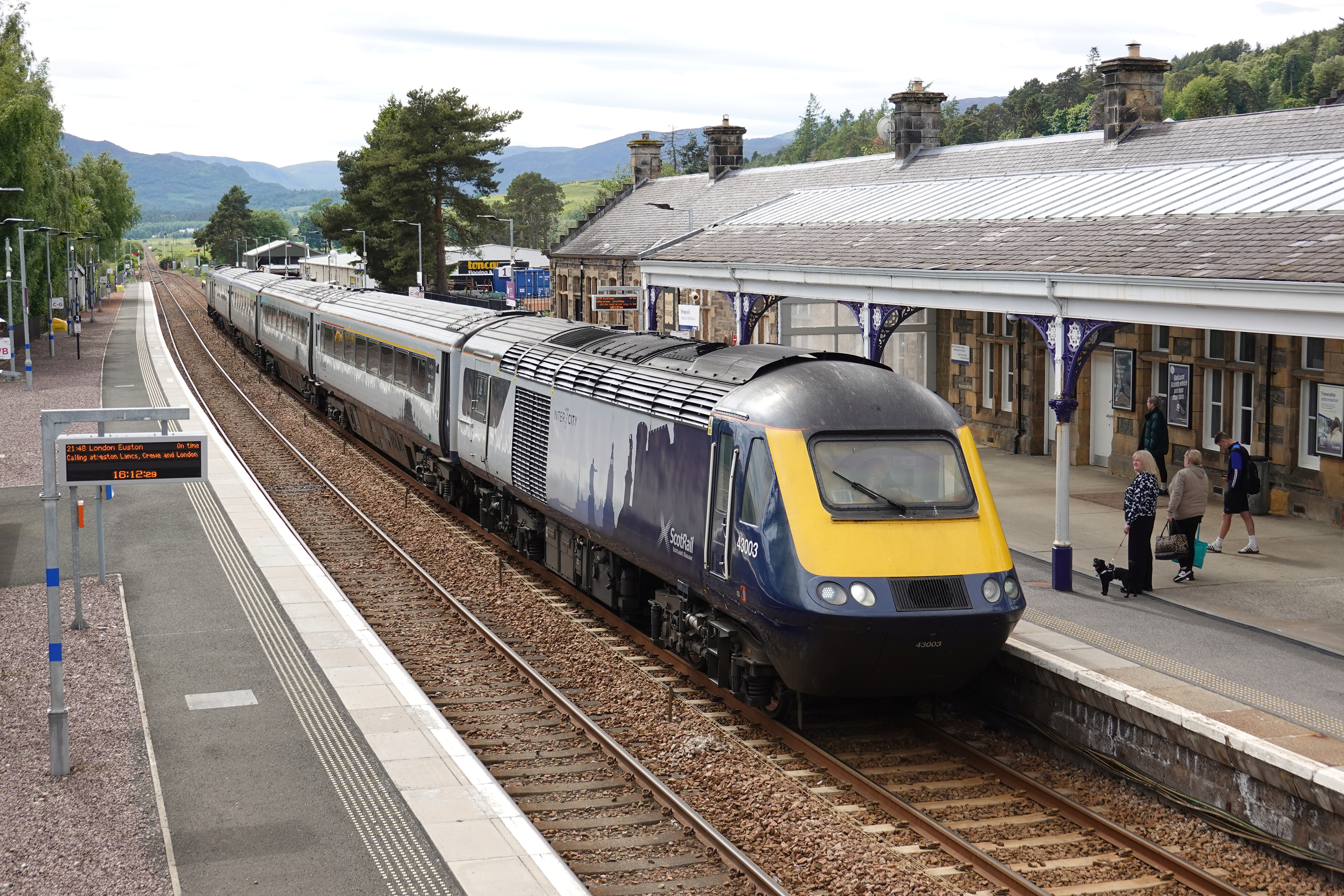
A ScotRail HST set at Kingussie in 2024

Twenty-seven sets each with four or five carriages moved from Great Western Railway to Abellio ScotRail and were refurbished with controlled emission tanks and plug automatic doors. These operate on services linking seven of Scotland's cities - Edinburgh and Glasgow to either Aberdeen or Inverness, with some services calling at Stirling, Perth and Dundee. The first two were delivered to Craigentinny TMD for crew training in September 2017. The first entered service in October 2018. They are scheduled to be replaced by Class 222 units, starting from late 2027.

=== Future ===
In 2018, GB Railfreight expressed interest in the possibility of converting displaced HST sets for use carrying parcels and other mail.

In 2021, RailAdventure acquired the six 43/4 power cars, plus an additional two for spares, for use on stock movements as part of its entrance into the UK market through the acquisition of Hanson and Hall Rail Services. Two were moved to Germany for display at a trade show in September 2021. They returned in November 2021.

On 25 November 2022, GWR announced it would be retiring their 'Castle' fleet. The withdrawals were expected to take place over a two-year period. The type was still in use in 2025 when it was announced that they would be replacing their remaining Class 43s with 26 Class 175 trains formerly operated by TfW. The final workings for the fleet took place on 13 December 2025.

In early August 2023, three power cars and 11 Mark 3 coaches were exported to Mexico for use on the Tren Interoceánico. They arrived in early September 2023.

== Fleet details ==
Summary
Status/Operator	Image	Qty.	Vehicle nos.
Colas Rail		10	43251, 43257, 43272, 43274, 43277, 43285, 43301, 43303, 43321, 43357
Great Western Railway		12	43004, 43042, 43092, 43093, 43097, 43098, 43156, 43186–43189, 43198
Locomotive Services Limited		9	43046, 43047, 43049, 43050, 43054, 43055, 43058, 43059, 43083
Network Rail		5	43013, 43014, 43062, 43290, 43299
RailAdventure		8	43296, 43308, 43423, 43465, 43467, 43468, 43480, 43484
ScotRail		52	43003, 43012, 43015, 43021, 43026, 43028, 43031–43037, 43124–43139, 43141–43152, 43163, 43164, 43168, 43169, 43175–43177, 43179, 43181–43183
Tren Interoceánico		11	43007, 43022, 43158, 43170, 43295, 43306, 43307, 43316, 43320, 43378
First Metro (Nigeria)		10	43008–43010, 43016, 43040, 43172, 43184, 43192, 43239, 43304, 43366
Preserved		18	43002, 43018, 43023, 43025, 43044, 43045, 43048, 43056, 43060, 43063, 43071, 43073, 43081, 43082, 43089, 43159, 43165, 43302
Stored		32	43024, 43027, 43029, 43066, 43076, 43088, 43091, 43094, 43122, 43153–43155 43160, 43162, 43190, 43194, 43206, 43238, 43305, 43309–43312, 43314–43316, 43318-43320, 43367,
Scrapped		33	43005, 43011, 43017, 43019, 43020, 43030, 43041, 43043, 43052, 43053, 43061, 43064, 43069, 43070, 43075, 43078, 43079, 43086, 43087, 43140, 43161, 43170, 43171, 43173, 43174, 43180, 43185, 43191, 43193, 43195–43197, 43300, 43313, 43317

== Fortieth anniversary ==
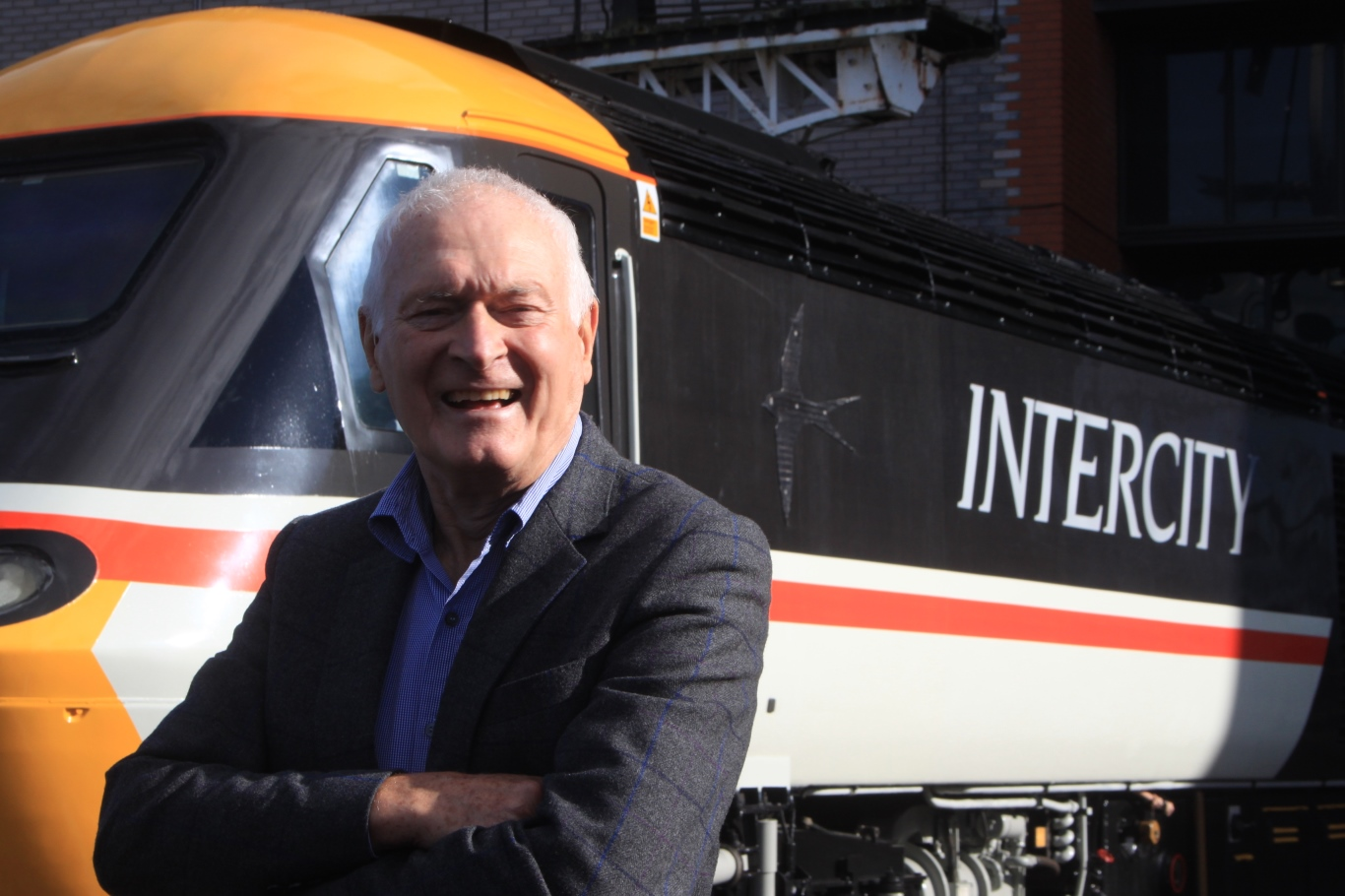
Sir Kenneth Grange on 2 October 2016, with InterCity 125 power car 43185, the bodyshell of which was designed by him in the 1970s, and which had just been repainted in the Intercity Swallow livery carried between 1987–1996

On 2 May 2016, an open day was held at Bristol St Philip's Marsh depot with a line up of Class 43s from each operator (except CrossCountry) to celebrate the HST's fortieth anniversary. Several locomotives and passenger trains also appeared, such as 150 247 and 166 214 both in their new GWR liveries, 158 798 in its Springboard Opportunity Group livery and the prototype Class 41 HST. At the event, power car 43002 (numbered 253 001 as a Diesel Multiple Unit) was unveiled in original Intercity 125 livery, and named Sir Kenneth Grange after the Class 43's bodyshell designer. On 2 October 2016, power car 43185 was unveiled in InterCity Swallow livery. Both were operated by Great Western Railway (First Great Western) and 43002 is now preserved, residing at the National Railway Museum at York.

== Accidents ==
There have also been four serious incidents involving Class 43s; these accidents resulted in five power cars being written off.

- Southall rail crash: on 19 September 1997, 43173 leading a Swansea to London Paddington service which failed to stop at a red signal, which resulted in a high-speed collision with a freight train.
- Ladbroke Grove rail crash: on 5 October 1999, a Class 165 unit 165 115, passed a signal set at danger while leaving London Paddington on a Thames Trains service. This resulted in a serious collision with 43011, forming a London-bound HST service; 31 people were killed, including the drivers of both trains involved.
- Ufton Nervet rail crash: on 6 November 2004, 43019 leading a London to Plymouth service, collided with a car on the Ufton Nervet level crossing. The impact with the car resulted in a serious derailment which killed six people aboard the train, including the driver; the investigation established that the collision was caused by the suicide of the car driver.
- Stonehaven derailment: on 12 August 2020 an Abellio ScotRail service that struck a landslide near Stonehaven on the Dundee-Aberdeen line, derailing the train and killing three. Both powercars, 43140 and 43030, were written off.

There have been minor incidents involving Class 43s, among which have been:

- On 28 August 1979, power car 43110 derailed south of Northallerton. The cause was attributed to low gearbox oil lubricant which caused the pinion to fail and lock the leading wheels on the train in place. With the rear power car pushing the train, this caused the locked wheels to skid, wearing a groove which developed false flanges on their outsides, one of which struck the points south of the station, which buckled the rail.
- On 16 March 1986, power car 43118 received collision damage after running through a buffer stop and derailing, while leaving Neville Hill TMD.
- On 3 April 2016, power car 43160 was involved in what was described as a 'low impact' collision at Plymouth railway station. A local commuter service collided with a Plymouth to London Paddington train at low speed and the power car received damage to its nose and valancing.
- On 20 August 2017, 43188 partly derailed on departure at Paddington while forming the rear power car of the 11:57 Great Western Railway service to Penzance. This was due to a track fault.
- On 31 December 2017, 43195 hit a tree near Hemerdon, Plymouth.
- On 17 April 2018, 43138 suffered damage due to an engine fire whilst at Penzance station.
- On 6 April 2019, 43045 caught fire at Leicester whilst working 14:45 Nottingham-London St Pancras.
- On 13 June 2019, 43054 collided with aggregate that had been washed-out from a cutting slope near Corby, Northamptonshire.
- On 13 November 2019, 43300 collided with an LNER Class 800 Azuma at Neville Hill TMD, Leeds.
- On 10 April 2021, 43012 was derailed near Dalwhinnie. The line between Aviemore and Pitlochry was closed.
- On 27 December 2023, 43129 crashed into a fallen tree near Arbroath station. The front cab was severely damaged.

== Replacement ==
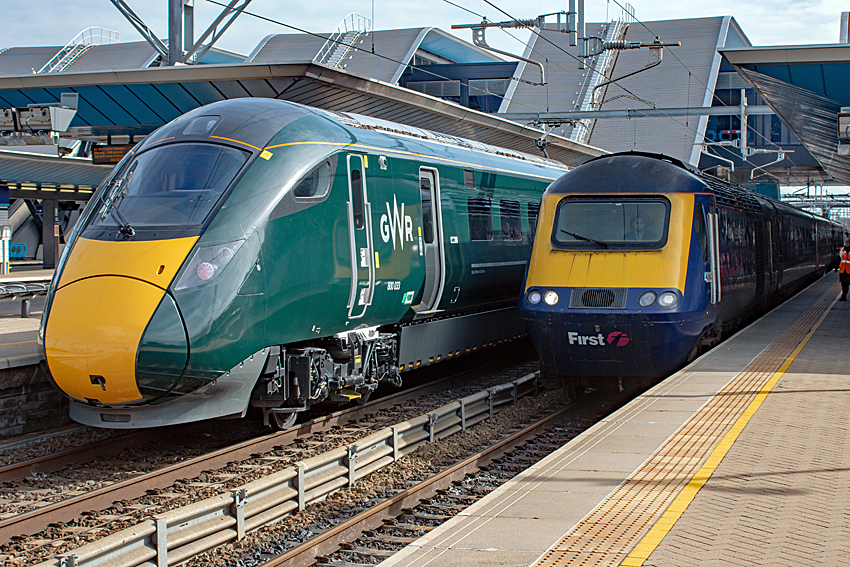
An IET and HST at Reading

The HST fleet is now in its sixth decade, and replacements are underway. This project, the Intercity Express Programme, is being spearheaded by the Department for Transport. A consortium headed by Hitachi has designed and built the new units, initially named "Super Express Train". Various formations are being built; both electric and bi-mode (electro-diesel) versions in five- or nine-coach lengths. The first batches have replaced HSTs on the Great Western Main Line and the East Coast Main Line.

On the Greater Western franchise, the last of the full-length HSTs was withdrawn in June 2019. Between 12 and 20 HST sets were originally to be retained and refurbished to carry on providing services between London, Devon and Cornwall, where no electrification was planned, and where the Class 800's diesel engines would not be capable of negotiating the steep gradients along the South Devon Banks, through to the mid-2020s. A report published in 2011 concluded that the Mark 3 coaches could remain in service as late as 2035, subject to some minor rewiring and enhancements required under disability legislation. However, it was announced in March 2015 that the HST would instead be replaced with the Class 802, a more powerful derivative of the bi-mode Class 800s.

Initially, high-speed Bombardier Voyager and Alstom Class 180 Adelante replaced numerous HST units, but all locomotives and sets were brought back into service as a result of increasing demand. Some Great Western sets were cascaded to Abellio ScotRail to replace the Class 170 units, while others were retained by GWR to operate local services. GWR will retire these units in favour of Class 802s by December 2023.

Grand Central Railway leased five more Class 180 units cascaded from GWR to replace its HST trains and increase its overall fleet size. This in turn allowed the HSTs to be cascaded to East Midlands Trains. The East Midlands Trains sets were passed to the new East Midlands Railway franchise, which announced it would replace them with a combination of Class 180 and Class 222 units, enabled owing to the electrification of the MML as far north as Corby, to be replaced ultimately by Class 810 bi-mode units.

Upon being retired, locomotive 43002 was preserved by the National Railway Museum in York. It was joined by 43102 (43302)

== Preservation ==
Nineteen Class 43 power cars have currently been saved for preservation.

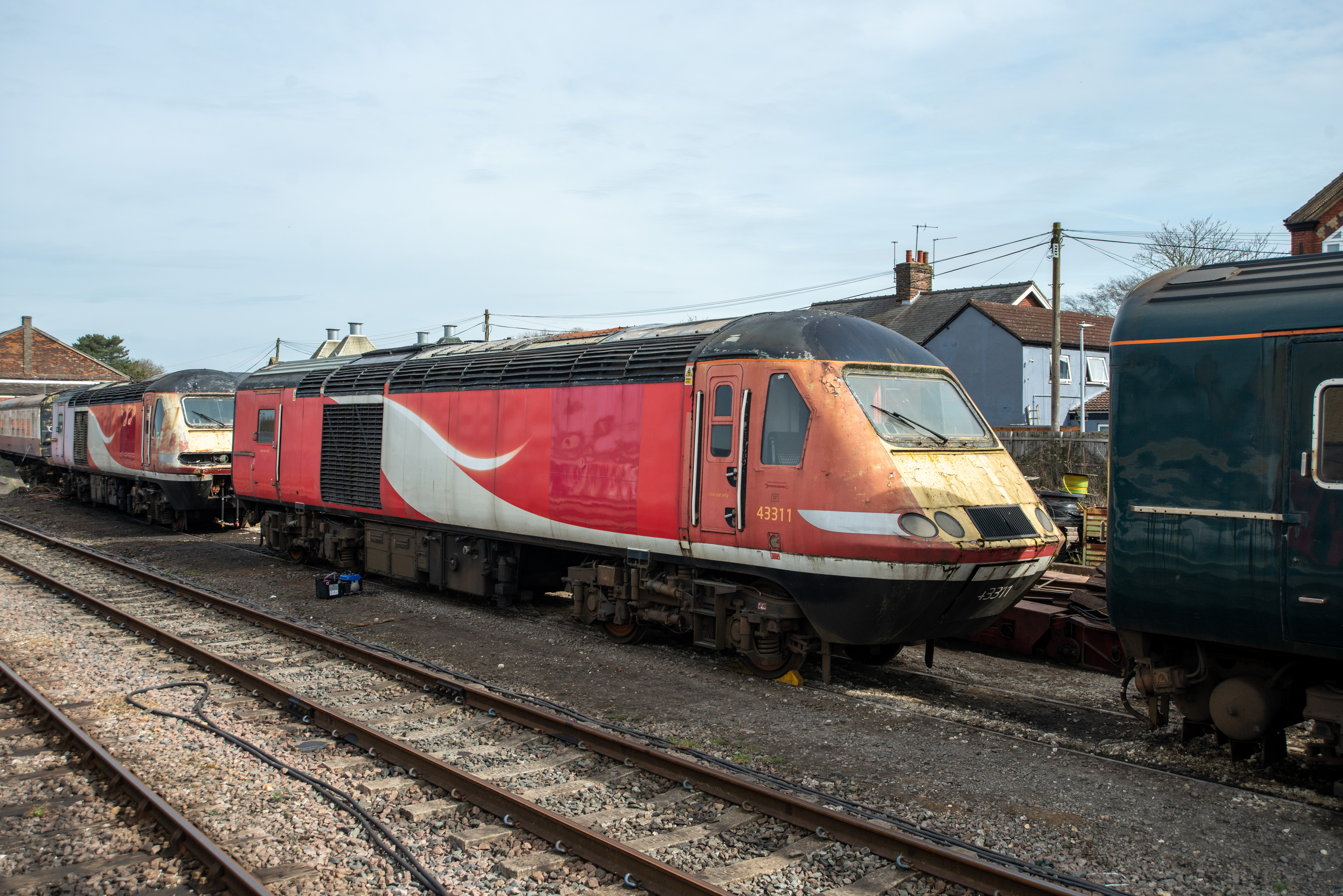
Class 43 43311 at the Mid Norfolk Railway

The National Railway Museum in York has preserved 43002, the first production power car. The Railway Heritage Designation Advisory Board nominated 43102 (43302) for preservation as holder of the record for being the fastest diesel locomotive on the planet. The power car was donated to the NRM upon its withdrawal from service in May 2021, and it is currently located at the NRM's museum at Shildon.

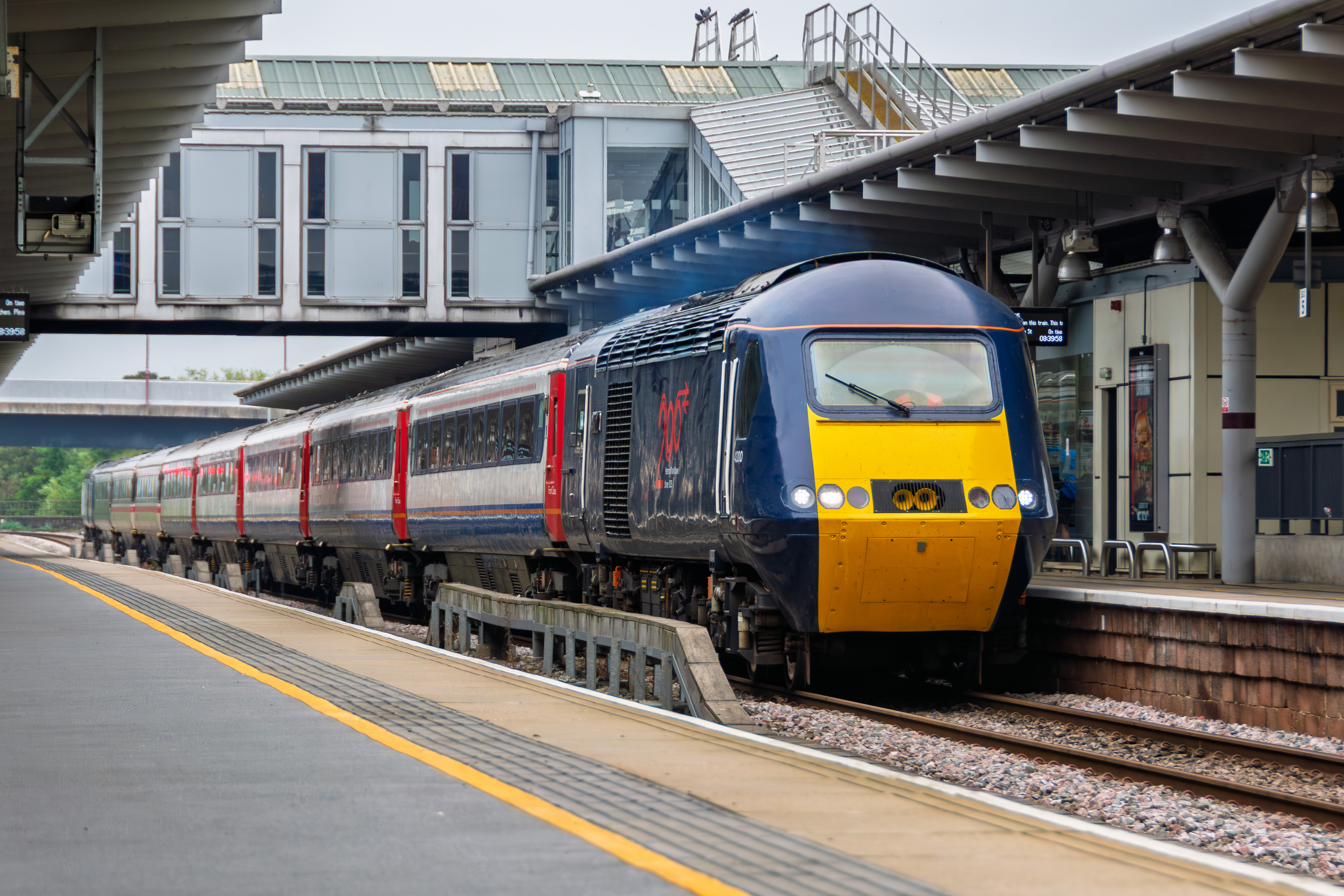
Class 43 43200, owned by the 125 Group, pulling a complete HST set at Derby railway station in 2025

Angel Trains donated 43018 to Crewe Heritage Centre following its use as a spares donor for Abellio ScotRail. Porterbrook also donated 43081, the 8,000th locomotive built at Crewe, to the museum in 2021. Porterbrook donated 43048 and 43089 to the 125 Group. Both moved to the group when their lease ended with East Midlands Railway. The group later purchased 43044 from Porterbrook in 2021, with 43159 being donated in June that year.

43045 has been preserved at the Long Marston Rail Innovation Centre following its period in service with Colas Rail and its time in storage.

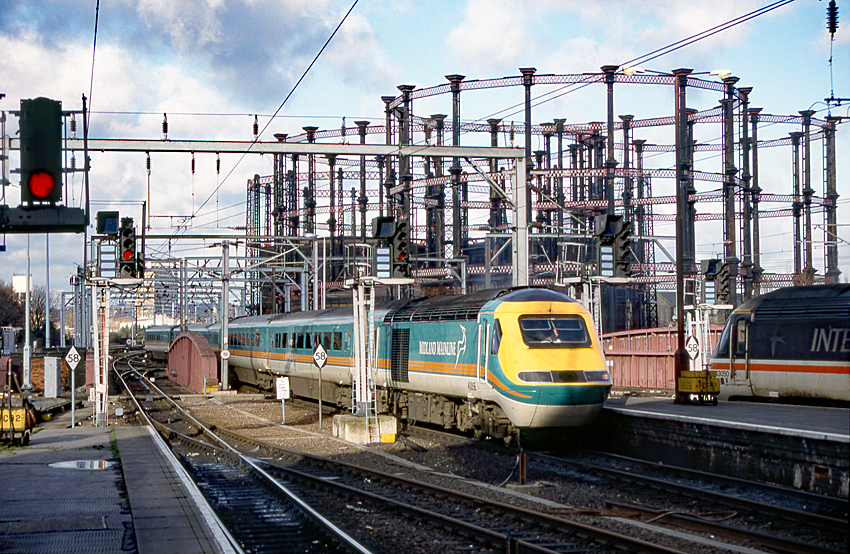
43056 in Midland Mainline livery passing the gasworks, St Pancras, 1998

The University of Birmingham leased 43056 for use as a research & development vehicle. In November 2021, the power car was donated to the Welsh Railways Trust based at the Gwili Railway. 125 Heritage Ltd, based at the Colne Valley Railway, has saved five power cars, 43023, 43071, 43073, 43082 and 43165.

In addition to these twelve, Locomotive Services Limited have saved seven power cars, 43046, 43047, 43049, 43055, 43058, 43059 and 43083 along with three sets of Mark 3 coaches for use on excursion trains. 43046 and 43055 have been refurbished and reliveried, along with a set of coaches, as a recreation of the Midland Pullman train.

== Models ==
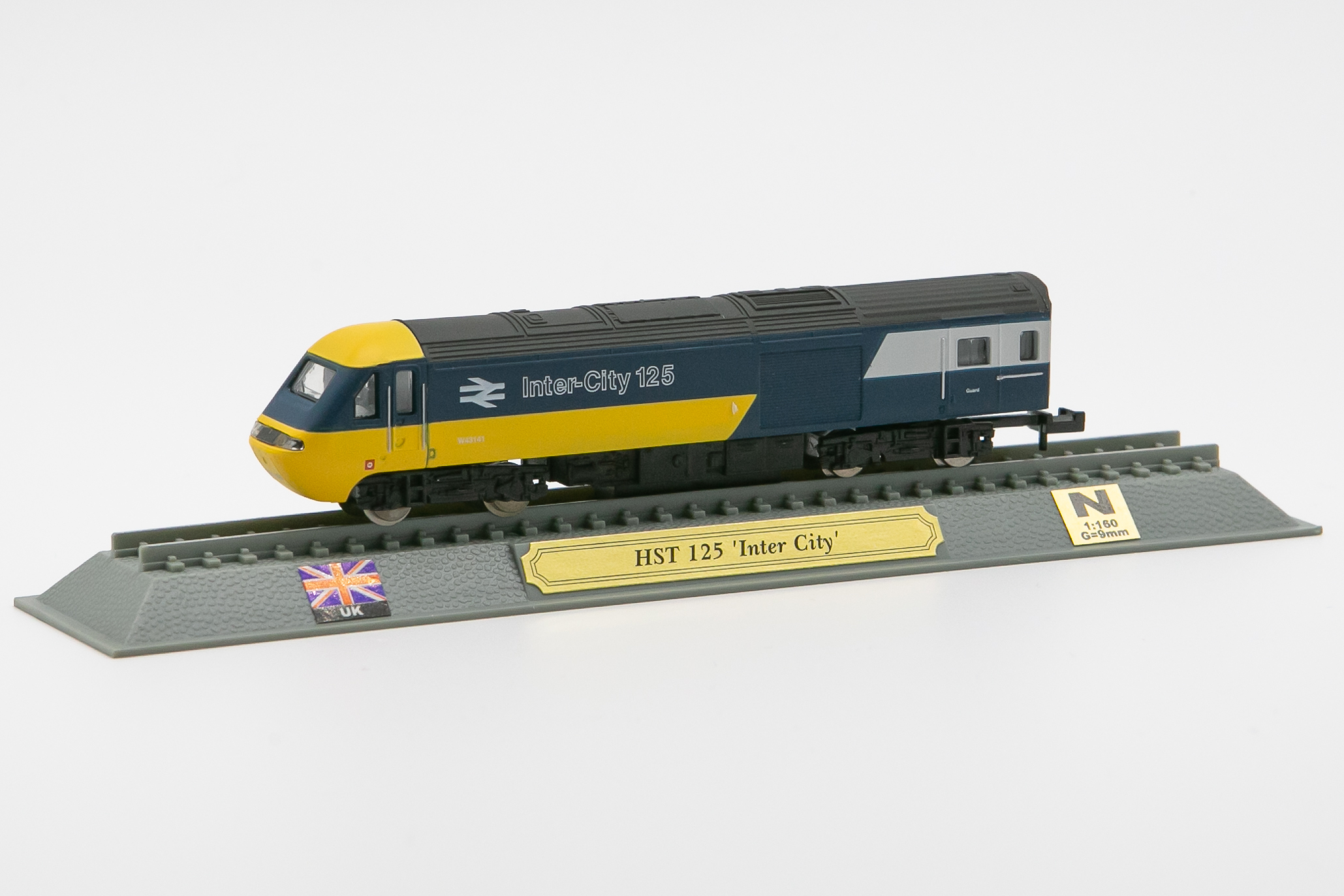
Class 253 Del Prado N Gauge scale BR Class 43 (HST) HST power car model

In 1977 Hornby Railways launched its first version of the BR Class 43 (HST) in OO gauge.

Lima have released an HST model in OO gauge.

Graham Farish and Dapol have both released HST models in British N gauge. Dapol introduced East Midlands Trains and Arriva Cross Country liveries, for the model, in 2012.

== See also ==
- List of British Rail Class 43 (HST) power cars - Names and conditions of all locomotives.
- High-speed rail in the United Kingdom - General history of UK high-speed rail transport.
- XPT (Express Passenger Train) - Australian high-speed train whose design was derived from the HST.
- Passenger locomotives in use in the UK
