= 125 Group =

Railway heritage group

- Formation: 1994
- Purpose: InterCity 125 train preservation
- Headquarters: East Lancashire Railway
- Website: www.125group.org.uk

The 125 Group is a railway heritage group in England dedicated to the preservation of the InterCity 125s.

The 125 Group was founded in 1994 at a time when the InterCity 125 remained in daily use and under no threat of withdrawal. In 2006, it purchased ten Paxman Valenta engines when the majority of the Class 43 powercars were repowered with a view to restoring some to original condition when withdrawn.

In 2011, it reached an agreement with the National Railway Museum to become the custodian of Class 41 prototype powercar 41001 and restore it to operational condition at Neville Hill TMD. This work was completed in 2014, with 41001 based at the Great Central Railway (Nottingham).

The group purchased a number of Mark 3 carriages to operate with it. These were Mark 3B variants that were compatible with 41001's electrical system and had last been operated by Virgin Trains West Coast with Class 87 and Class 90 electric locomotives. In 2020, these were sold and replaced by ex-HST Mark 3s, three from East Midlands Railway and one ex First Great Western.

During 2019, the National Railway Museum terminated the lease of 41001. Upon being withdrawn in 2020, former East Midlands Railway Class 43 powercars 43048 and 43089 were donated by Porterbrook to the 125 Group. In 2021, the group purchased a third powercar, 43044, from Porterbrook. It is planned to replace its Paxman VP185 engine with a Paxman Valenta. In June 2021, Porterbrook donated a fourth powercar, 43159, that was involved in the record-breaking 148 mph (238 km/h) run on the East Coast Main Line in 1987. With this former First Great Western power car having a MTU engine, the group has examples of all three engine types used by the Class 43s.

In 2023 43025 was purchased thanks to a donation from a member of the group. In November 2025 43190 was acquired as a parts source from Romic in exchange for some Mark 3 carriages.
