= John Uff =

Arbitrator, advocate, engineer and academic

John Francis Uff CBE KC (born 30 January 1942) is an international arbitrator, advocate, engineer and academic.

He graduated from King's College London (BSc (Eng); PhD) and was called to the Bar at Gray's Inn in 1970 where he was made a bencher in 1993 and Treasurer in 2011. He was the founding Director of the Centre of Construction Law & Dispute Resolution and Nash Professor of Engineering Law at King's College London from 1991 to 2003. He was Chairman of the Public Inquiry into the Southall rail crash which took place between 1997 and 1999. He retired from the Nash chair at King's College London in 2003 and was made an emeritus Professor there. He was vice-president of the London Court of International Arbitration from 2003 to 2008 and President of the Society of Construction Arbitrators from 2004 to 2007.

He was made a Fellow of King's College London in 1997. He was made a CBE in the 2002 New Year Honours and awarded the Gold Medal of the Institution of Civil Engineers in 2002.
