= RailAdventure =

Train operating company

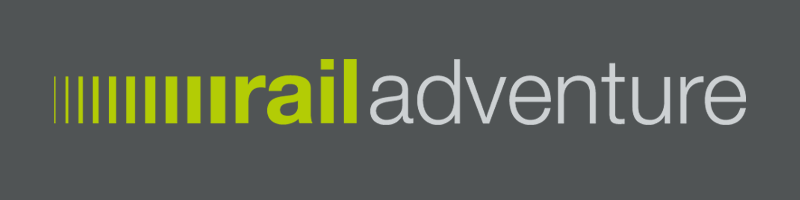
- Industry: Railway
- Founded: 2006
- Headquarters: Pullach, Germany
- Area served: Europe; United Kingdom
- Website: www.railadventure.de

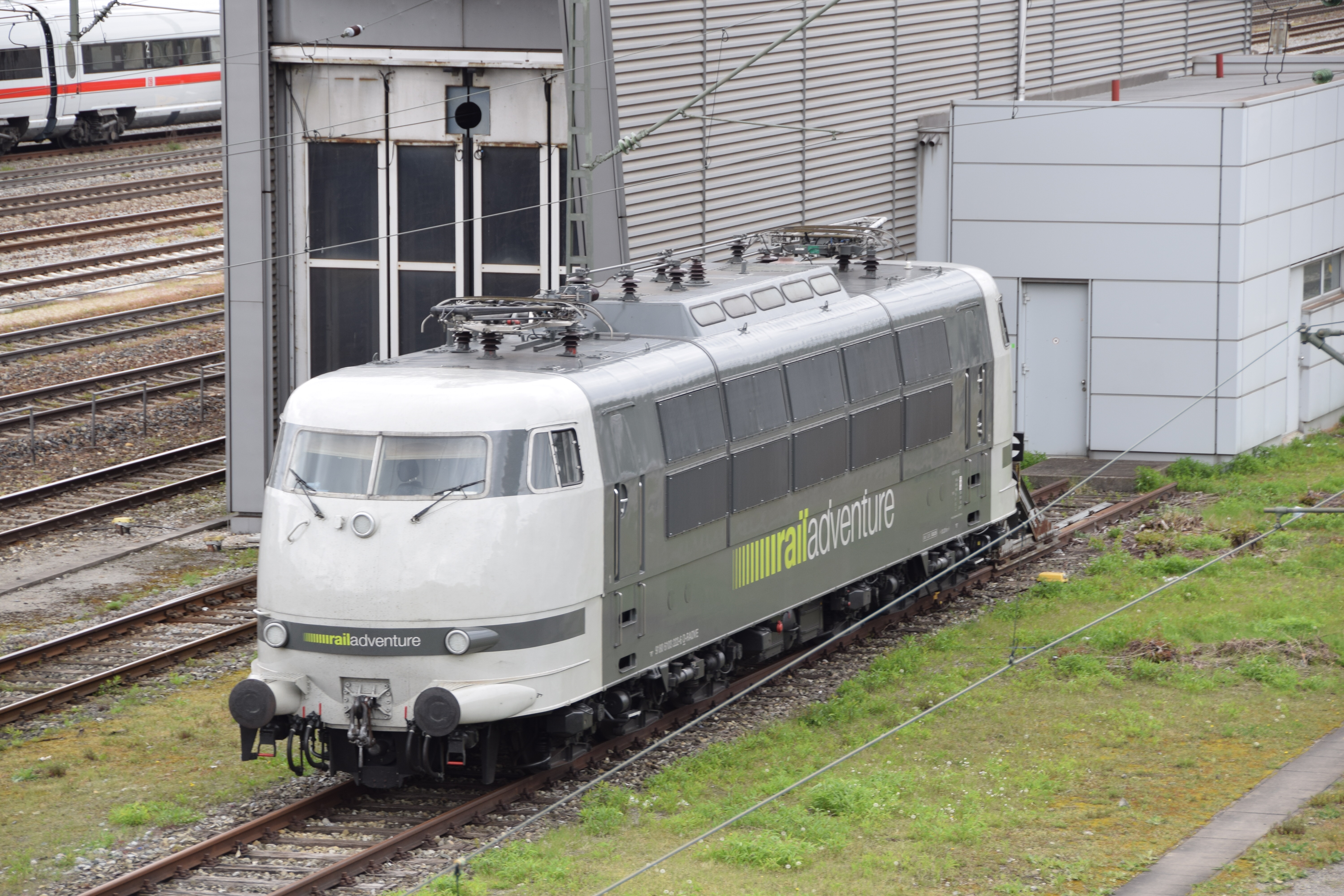
DB Class 103 in Munich in May 2015

RailAdventure is a train operator based in Munich, Germany. Founded in 2006, it operates a fleet of ex-Deutsche Bundesbahn and Swiss Federal Railways locomotives.

== United Kingdom ==
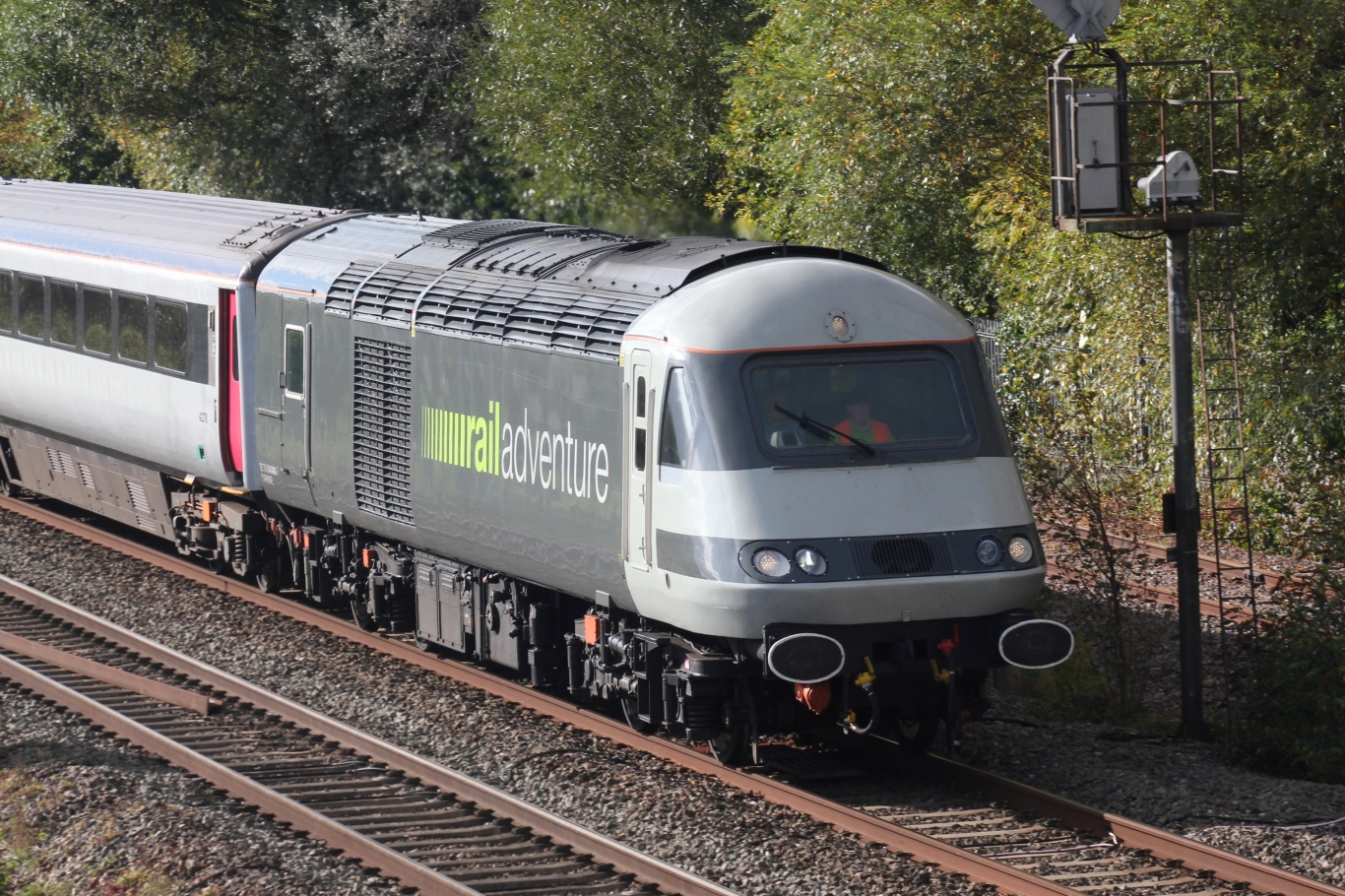
A RailAdventure Class 43 pulling an empty stock train at Norton Fitzwarren

In April 2021 the company bought existing UK train operating company SLC Operations, subsequently renamed RailAdventure UK Ltd. The company purchased eight Class 43 power cars from Angel Trains, six for dual-car operational use, and two for spare parts. It has been involved in hauling the Class 777, Class 555 and Class 802 rolling stock to the Eurotunnel Calais Terminal on their delivery runs.
