= Southall rail crash =

1997 high-speed rail crash near London

- The remains of Coach G of the High Speed Train

Details
- Date: 19 September 1997; 29 years ago 13:20
- Location: Southall
- Country: England
- Line: Great Western Main Line
- Operator: Great Western Trains (InterCity 125), Hanson (freight train)
- Incident type: Collision
- Cause: Signal passed at danger

Statistics
- Trains: 2
- Passengers: 212
- Deaths: 7
- Injured: 139

The Southall rail crash occurred on 19 September 1997, on the Great Western Main Line at Southall, West London. An InterCity 125 high speed passenger train (HST) failed to slow down in response to warning signals and collided with a freight train crossing its path, causing seven deaths and 139 injuries.

A 'major incident' was immediately declared and large-scale criminal investigation commenced. Detective Superintendent Graham Satchwell of the British Transport Police led the investigation. The Home Office Large Major Enquiry System (HOLMES) was quickly deployed at the Police Major Incident Room at St.Pancras.

The passenger train operating company had failed to inform Railtrack and the signaller that the automatic warning system (AWS), which warns drivers of adverse signals, had been turned off in the cab of the HST. As a result, the signaller set a route which would stop the HST and allow the freight train to cross in front of it. If the signaller had known that the AWS in the express was not working, he would have been prevented by the operating rules from setting a conflicting route. The HST driver did not apply the brakes until it was too late because he was packing his bag and did not see the cautionary signals. He was charged with manslaughter by gross negligence, but the charges were later dropped.

Great Western Trains, whose managing director survived the crash in one of the most badly affected carriages, was fined for failure to ensure that the HST had their automatic warning system working during long journeys.

== Accident ==
The collision occurred as the 10:32 Great Western Trains (GWT) InterCity 125 HST returned from Swansea toward London Paddington. The train was formed of Class 43 power car 43173, eight Mark 3 carriages, and power car 43163. The driver at the time of the collision, Larry Harrison, boarded the train at Cardiff.

Earlier that day, the HST's previous driver, James Tunnock, had found a fault with the Automatic Warning System (AWS) that prevented the brakes from releasing. In response, he isolated (disabled) the AWS at 06:00 but did not report the failure to the signaller and to Railtrack as was required to enable extra signalling precautions. A fault with the AWS in the London-end power car had also been reported on the previous day, but testing at the Old Oak Common maintenance depot overnight failed to reveal any fault, and the train was passed for service.

As the HST approached Southall East Junction, the driver failed to heed two warning signals (a double yellow followed by a single yellow) without slowing the train down, and only reacted by applying the emergency brake when the red danger signal came into view. As the tracks on the Up Main Line straightened ahead of the HST, the driver saw the Hanson-operated Class 59 locomotive 59101 Village of Whatley a mile in the distance, moving "at a funny angle," and realised that it was crossing his path. The freight train, which was formed of 20 empty bogie hopper wagons, was coming from London on the Down Relief line toward the north side, and had been signalled to cross the main lines at Southall East Junction on its way into Southall Yard on the south side. The driver of the freight train, Alan Bricker, observed the approaching HST and expected it to stop, but was alarmed by its speed and apparent brake application. He tried to accelerate his train out of its path of the HST, but to no avail. A collision was now inevitable. The HST was travelling at 125 mph (201 km/h) when the driver saw the danger signal, so even though he applied the emergency brake, the collision occurred at more than 80 mph (130 km/h).

The later accident inquiry report found that:

1. At 13:20, the front power car of the HST collided with a 22-tonne (22-ton) hopper car.
2. Two seconds later, coach H collided with a hopper. The HST power car severed the brake pipes of the freight train, causing the stranded rear hopper wagons to stop immediately. A coupling from one of the hoppers was then severed by the derailed and damaged front power car as it passed by, causing debris to land on the track.
3. Four seconds into the accident, with the HST still travelling at 60 mph (97 km/h), coach H collided with the severed coupling from the freight train, and began to topple away from the freight train onto its left side. It slid on its side for a further four seconds. Two people died in this carriage, falling through destroyed windows and then crushed under coach H as it slid over them.
4. Eight seconds into the accident, with both the forward HST power car and coach H clear forward of the scene, coach G—the second coach in the HST formation—hit the now stationary rear of the freight train. The freight wagons were driven back and jackknifed.
5. Both coach G and the struck hopper wagon lifted into the air. The hopper wagon was restrained in its movement, and collided and jammed up against the nearby overhead line stanchions. The front of coach G was flattened as it slid under the hopper.
6. Ten seconds into the accident, the rear of the HST, led by coach F, collided with the now stationary coach G. The energy release of the still moving rear of the HST bent the structure of coach G into a distinct half-curve at its midpoint. Five people died in coach G, which was almost completely destroyed.
7. The rear of the HST, led by coach F, collided with the stationary rear of the freight train. Coach F was left derailed.

Seven passengers died; six at the scene and one in hospital.

The HST driver said he was aware of the isolated AWS but admitted to a lack of focus, referring to putting items in his bag before the incident twice in his tape-recorded conversation with signallers at the nearest trackside telephone:

"I'm okay, yeah, I was just putting me stuff away in the bag the A, the A, the, the AWS has been isolated because some, some brake problem, I believe, so, I had no AWS so, I put me stuff away in the bag and the next thing I knew, I was coming up against red, up, such coming through, through...Through Southall, yeah"... ..."I was just putting me stuff away in the bag, like I would normally do, you see. (signaller: Right.) And all of a sudden I was whizzing through Hayes with a red at Southall (signaller: Right.) I see the slow train crossing over then"

If the AWS or the ATP equipment on the HST had been working, the chance of the accident occurring would have been highly unlikely. Functioning AWS would have given the HST driver an audible warning that he was running towards a signal at danger and needed to start braking. Failure to press the AWS cancelling button to acknowledge the warning would have caused the emergency brake to apply. The train was also fitted with fully operational Automatic Train Protection (ATP) equipment, both at trackside and in the London-end power car, but it was not switched on because neither drivers Harrison nor Tunnock were then qualified to drive with ATP. From 1996, 125 mph (201 km/h) high speed trains were driven by one driver only, following the removal of a requirement for a second driver.

== Aftermath ==
Following this accident and the Ladbroke Grove rail crash, First Great Western (as GWT had become) required all its trains to have ATP switched on. If the equipment is faulty, the train is taken out of service. It emerged after the incident that the reset switch of the warning system had contamination on its electrical contact surfaces which rendered its performance intermittent, hence its disabling at Oxford the day before the crash.

The HST driver and operator were charged with manslaughter, but the charges were later dropped. GWT was fined £1.5 million for not having a system to ensure HSTs were not operated for long journeys with AWS inoperative.

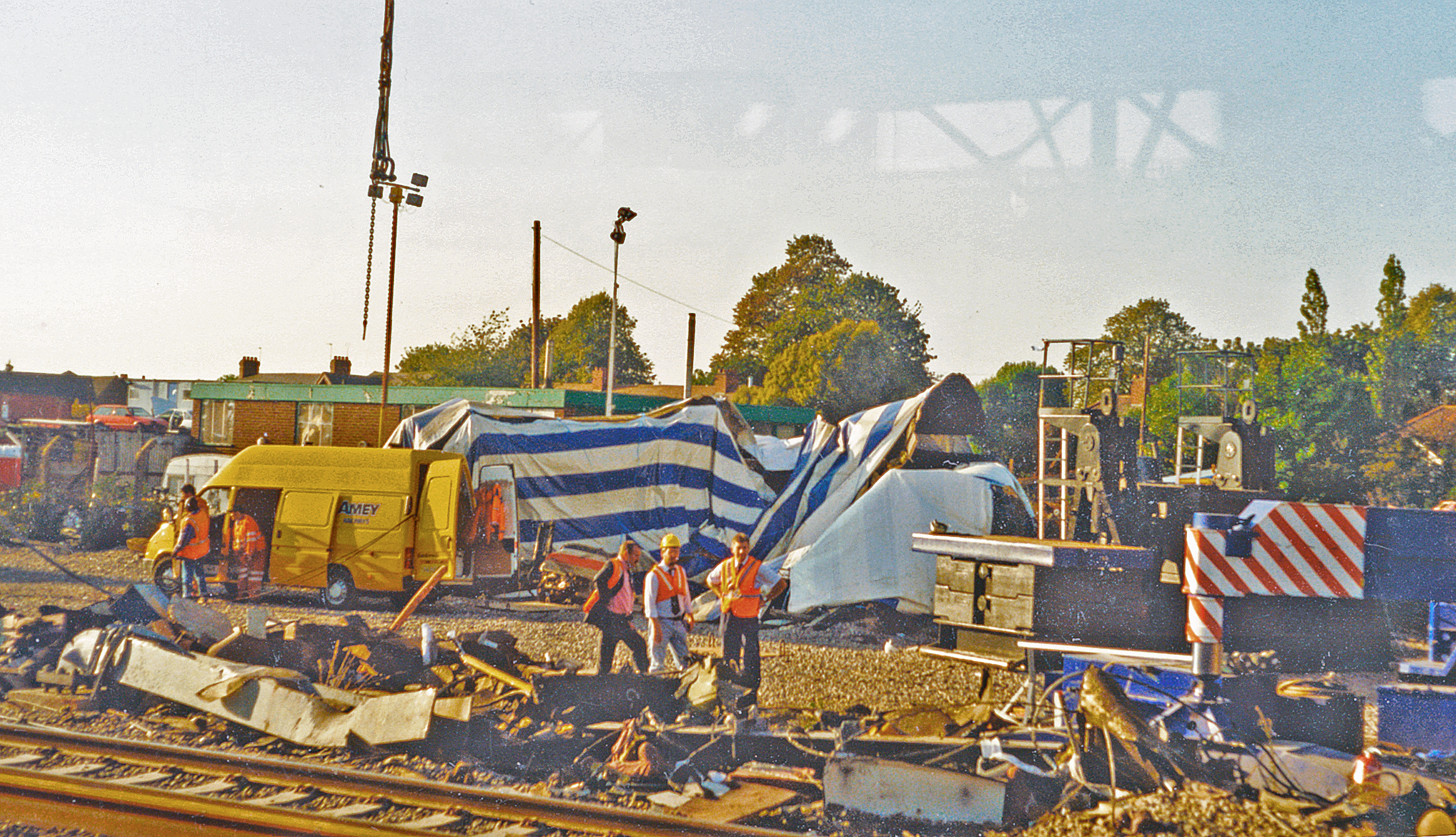
View of the aftermath from a passing train

The action of the signaller in stopping a high-speed passenger train to allow a slow freight train to cross in front of it has been criticised. However, this is standard procedure when regulating trains to minimise overall delay; there was no reason for the signaller to expect that the HST driver would not stop at the red signal protecting the crossover. At the time there was no requirement for the signaller to have been informed that the HST was in service with its AWS isolated. The Rail Safety and Standards Board rulebook was revised to cover this:

"Driver.....if you become aware that the AWS has become defective when it is required to be in operation, you must.....tell the signaller"

A public inquiry into the incident was formally opened on 24 February 1998, with Professor John Uff appointed to chair by the Health and Safety Commission with the consent of the Secretary of State for Environment, Transport and the Regions. The report was published on 24 February 2000 with 93 recommendations to improve rail safety.

The key point identified in the report was that drivers had become increasingly reliant on AWS with single-manning and high speeds, and that it was no longer acceptable to run trains at full speed if the equipment was inoperative. The rulebook was changed, so that if AWS is isolated the train may only run at high speed with a competent person accompanying the driver in the cab. This person must have full knowledge of the route and know how to stop the train:

"If a competent person is provided....proceed at normal permissible speed to the location where the train can be dealt with. During poor visibility, the train speed must not exceed 40 mph (65 km/h)"

or

"If a competent person is not provided...proceed at a speed not exceeding 40 mph (65 km/h), or any lower permissible speed that may apply, to the location where a competent person is available or to the location where the train can be dealt with"

Among survivors in the two most severely stricken coaches in front of the buffet car were Richard George, then managing director of GWT, who played a valuable role in establishing calm, and four injured members of staff in the buffet car, who quickly organised help for passengers.

After the completion of the inquiry, power car 43173, which had sustained heavy damage in the collision, was scrapped at a Serco site in Shoeburyness. In 2021, power car 43163, which sustained minor damage in the accident, was in service with Abellio ScotRail, having been transferred to the fleet in 2018 among other HSTs.

In 2003, a memorial plaque was unveiled at 51.5055°N 0.3782°W.
