= Paxman VP185 =

Railway and maritime transport engine

Overview
- Manufacturer: Paxman

Layout
- Configuration: V12 & V18
- Cylinder bore: 185 millimetres (7.283 in)
- Piston stroke: 196 millimetres (7.717 in)
- Cylinder block material: cast iron

Combustion
- Operating principle: four-stroke diesel, turbo-charged & intercooled
- Fuel system: Direct injection, unit injectors
- Fuel type: Diesel

Chronology
- Predecessor: Paxman Valenta

The Paxman VP185 is an internal combustion engine formerly manufactured by Paxman in Colchester, England. It is used in marine and railway applications, and was available as both a V12 and V18 configuration.

== History ==
The VP185 was launched in May 1993 as a successor to the Paxman Valenta. It differed from the Valenta with a 90-degree cylinder bank angle, rather than a 60-degree vee to reduce its height, unit pump injectors eliminating two camshafts, side by side connecting rods to reduce manufacturing costs, higher firing pressures; increased power output, improved fuel consumption and emissions performance.

Beginning in 1994, a small number of British Rail Class 43 (HST) power cars were fitted with Paxman VP185 engines, however the majority retained Valentas into the 21st century. With the Class 43s in need of new engines in the mid-2000s, most operators opted for the MTU engines. East Midlands Trains, who already was the largest operator with 14, opted to standardise on VP185s, ultimately having 26 examples. The last was withdrawn from regular service by East Midlands Railway in December 2020, however several have gone for further service with Colas Rail and Locomotive Services Limited.

The engine was also fitted to CountryLink's 19 XPT power cars in Australia, which were based on the HST power car design, in the early 2000s when it opted to replace its Valentas.

In 2014, Paxman's successor, MAN Diesel & Turbo UK, sold the first of 60 VP185 diesel engines to the Ching Fu Shipbuilding Company for use in 28 fast patrol vessels for the Taiwanese coastguard service; the remainder were to be supplied over a six-year period.

Production of the VP185 ceased in 2020, coinciding with the closure of MAN Diesel & Turbo UK's factory at Colchester.
