= Paxman Valenta =

Railway and maritime transport diesel engine

- Paxman Valenta V12 power unit with turbocharger and Brush Traction alternator fitted

Overview
- Manufacturer: Paxman
- Designer: Roy Dingle, Morriss Clover, Arthur Hammond, Ray Roxby
- Also called: Y3J and RP200
- Production: 1972–around 2000

Layout
- Configuration: I6, 60° V8, 60° V12, 60° V16, 60° V18
- Displacement: I6: 39.48 litres (2,410 cu in); V8: 52.64 litres (3,210 cu in); V12: 78.96 litres (4,820 cu in); V16: 105.28 litres (6,420 cu in); V18: 118.44 litres (7,230 cu in)
- Cylinder bore: 197 millimetres (7.756 in)
- Piston stroke: 216 millimetres (8.504 in)
- Cylinder block material: Cast iron
- Cylinder head material: Cast iron
- Valvetrain: OHV, 4 per cylinder
- Valvetrain drive system: Gear-driven
- Compression ratio: 13:1

RPM range
- Idle speed: 600 rpm
- Max. engine speed: 1,640 rpm

Combustion
- Operating principle: four-stroke diesel, turbo-charged & intercooled
- Turbocharger: Water-cooled turbocharger, two on lower-power engines
- Fuel system: Lucas Bryce unit injector direct injection per cylinder
- Management: Regulateurs Europa 1100 series centrifugal governor, remotely operable
- Fuel type: diesel, 45 cetane
- Oil system: wet sump, SAE30 or 40
- Cooling system: Water-cooled

Output
- Power output: I6: 1,007 kW (1,350 bhp; 1,369 PS) at 1,600 rpm V8: 1,492 kW (2,001 bhp; 2,029 PS) at 1,600 rpm V12: 1,680–2,440 kW; 2,280–3,320 PS (2,250–3,270 bhp) at 1,500-1,640 rpm V16: 3,250 kW (4,360 bhp; 4,420 PS) at 1,640 rpm V18: 3,655 kW (4,901 bhp; 4,969 PS) at 1,640 rpm

Dimensions
- Dry weight: V12: 8.12 tonnes (7.99 long tons; 8.95 short tons); V18: 11.15 tonnes (10.97 long tons; 12.29 short tons)

Chronology
- Predecessor: Paxman Ventura
- Successor: Paxman VP185

The Paxman Valenta, also known as Y3J and RP200, is a diesel fuelled internal combustion engine formerly made by Paxman in Colchester, England. It was originally developed for, and previously used in the British Rail (BR) Class 43 diesel-electric locomotives, a pair of which powered the InterCity 125 High Speed Train (HST) in a push-pull train set configuration. The Valenta has also been used for electricity generation in diesel generators on offshore oil rig platforms in British waters.

It is still in use in various marine applications today, such as the Upholder / Victoria class submarines, and additionally to provide the electrical power to propel and operate the Royal Navy's Type 23 frigates. The Valenta marine range was available brake powers ranging from 695 to 3,655 kilowatts (940 to 4,970 metric horsepower; 930 to 4,900 brake horsepower) rated to ISO 3046.

== History ==
=== Locomotive use ===
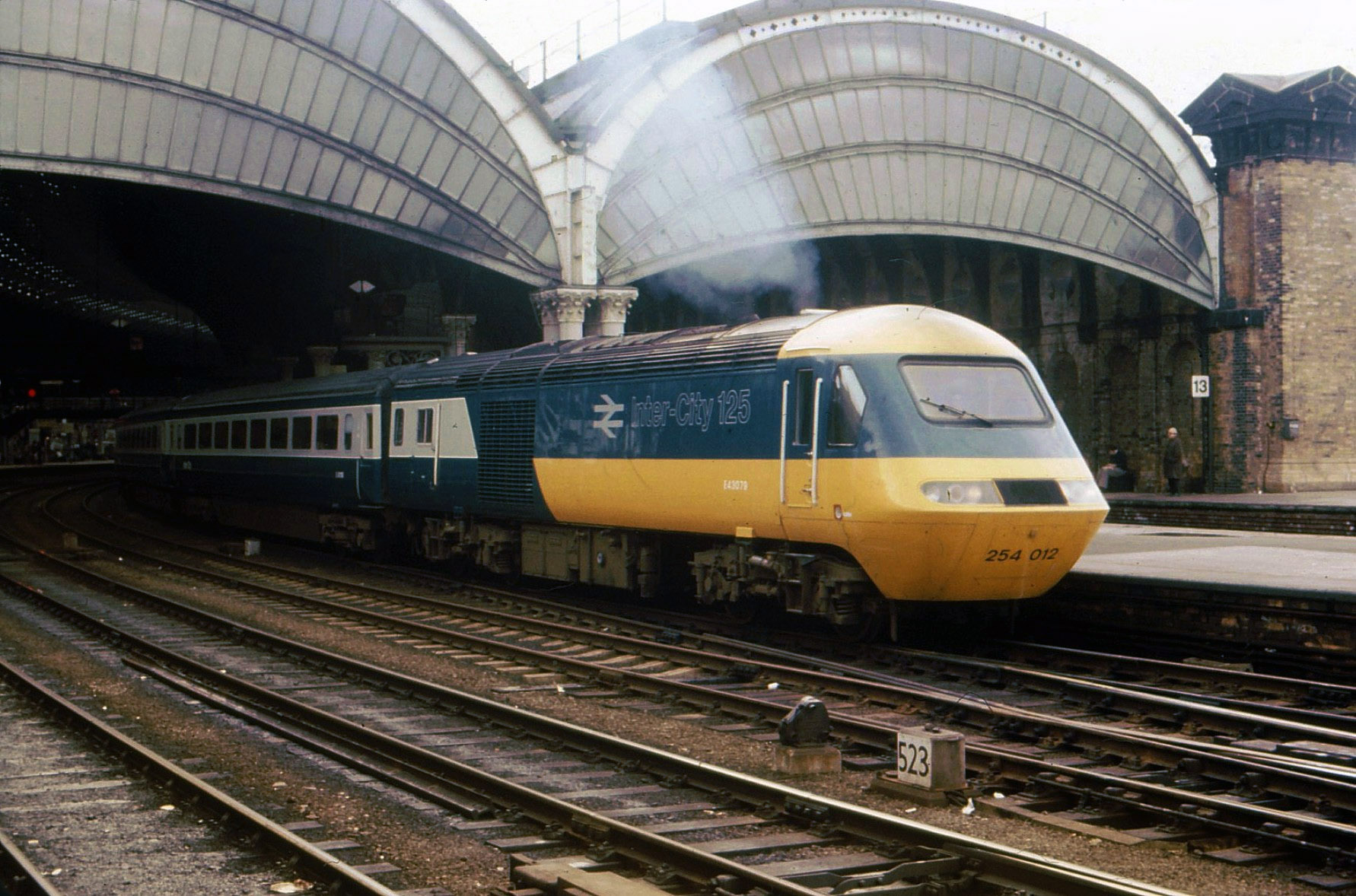
Class 43 with Paxman Valenta engine at York.

The Paxman Valenta was developed in the early 1970s for British Rail (BR) with the aim of using in both freight and passenger locomotives. The engine was used in 1972 in the two pre-production Class 41, and 197 production Class 43 power-cars that were delivered to power HSTs between 1975 and 1982. In June 1973, the Valenta powered HST prototypes achieved a world speed record for diesel traction engines, reaching 143.2 miles per hour (230.5 kilometres per hour). This world speed record was beaten in 1987 by a Valenta powered production HST, this time reaching 148 miles per hour (238 kilometres per hour).

The engine as originally fitted to the HSTs was designated 12RP200L, and was a V12 four-stroke diesel engine with direct injection unit injectors, turbocharger and air-cooled intercooler. It had a displacement of 78.96 litres (4,820 cubic inches), which developed 2,250 brake horsepower (1,680 kilowatts; 2,280 metric horsepower) at 1,500 revolutions per minute. The design of the Valenta was based on the Ventura which was fitted to the Class 29 diesel locomotives, amongst others. The engine is famous for the 'Valenta Scream' on starting from rest, a distinctive high-pitched whine caused by the engine's turbocharger. In 1977, the Valenta received the Queen's Awards for Enterprise.

In 1985, four power-cars (43167-43170) were fitted with Mirrlees MB190 engines. Beginning in 1995, a small number were fitted with Paxman VP185 engines, however the majority retained Valentas.

In May 2005, First Great Western had Brush Traction fit two with MTU 16V4000 R41 engines, these V16 units which use common rail fuel injection are ultimately capable of developing 2,720 kilowatts (3,700 metric horsepower; 3,650 brake horsepower), though they are de-rated in the Class 43 HSTs to match the performance of the original Paxman engine. Judged a success, no doubt due to improved fuel economy, as part of a project to extend the lives of the HSTs, First Great Western decided to re-power its entire fleet. Great North Eastern Railway (GNER), CrossCountry, Network Rail, and Grand Central also decided to re-power their fleets with MTUs. The only operator not to was East Midlands Trains, which opted to replace its Valentas with Paxman VP185s.

Grand Central's 43084 and 43123 were the last two Valenta-engined power-cars in service. They were taken out of traffic on 22 December 2010 for re-powering with the latter named Valenta 1972-2010.

=== Restoration ===
In May 2011, it was announced that the 125 Group would return prototype HST powercar 41001 to service. The power-car was at that time on static display at the National Railway Museum (NRM) in York, England. It received a full overhaul, and was fitted with a reconditioned Paxman Valenta RP200L engine, number S508 installed new into Virgin CrossCountry's 43153 in 2001, before re-installation into First Great Western's 43143 after a spell in storage. It was one of about 10 engines that the 125 Group obtained.

On 15 November 2014, 41001 hauled its first passenger train in preservation.

=== Australian XPT ===
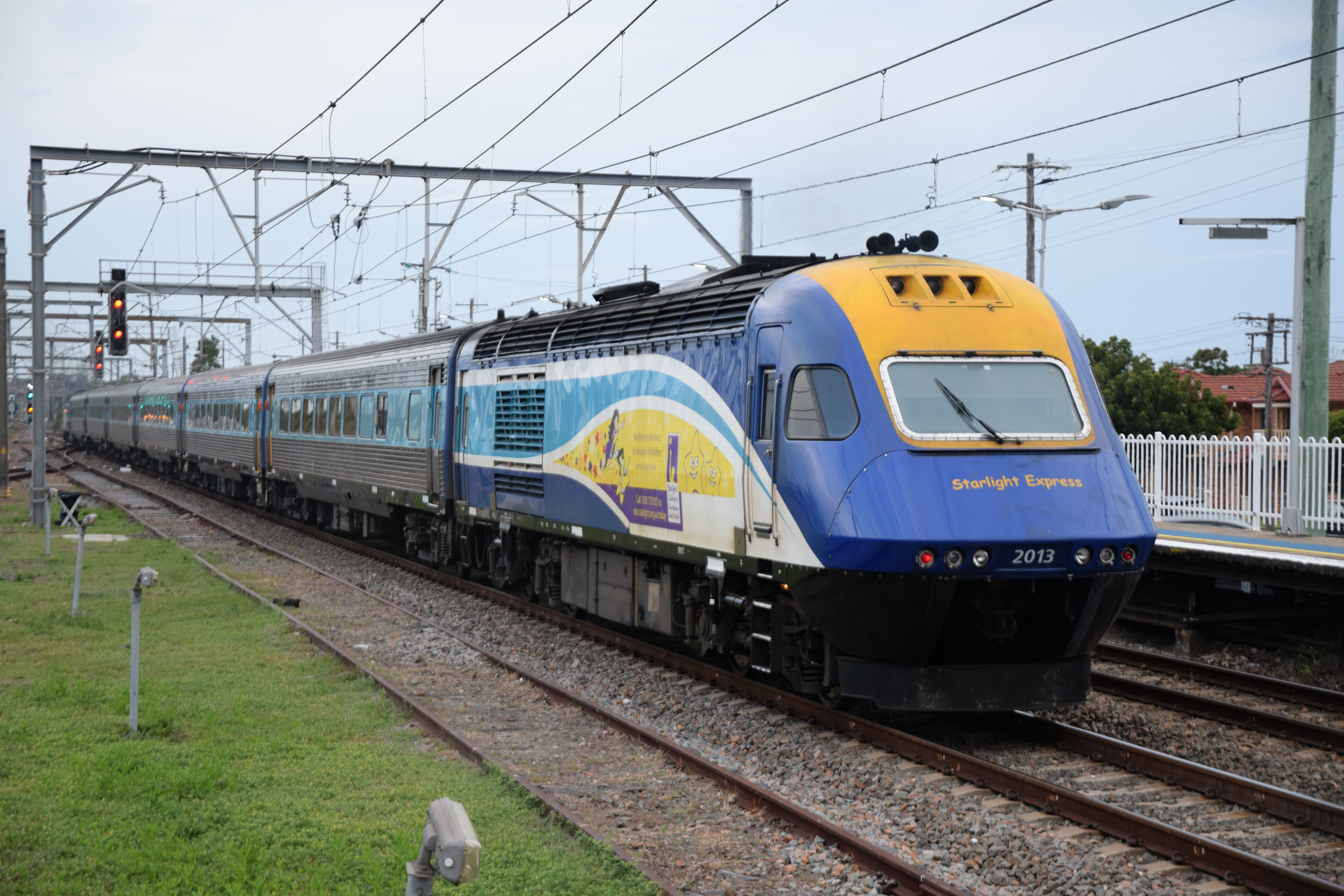
New South Wales XPT, originally powered by Paxman Valenta engines.

The engine was also fitted to the State Rail Authority's New South Wales XPT, or Express Passenger Train, which was based on the HST power car design. Fifteen power car units were built in the 1980s by Commonwealth Engineering, Sydney, supplied with twenty Paxman Valenta engines rated at 2,000 brake horsepower (1,491 kilowatts; 2,028 metric horsepower). This was followed by four additional power cars (using four Paxman supplied Valenta engines) by ABB Transportation, Melbourne in 1994. All were re-powered with VP185s in the early 2000s.

== Usage ==
Inline 6 – 6RP200

- Royal Navy, Sandown Class MCMVs (mine countermeasures vessels), 6RP200E producing 1,523 shaft horsepower (1.136 megawatts). Twelve ships were completed, the first HMS Sandown (M101) was commissioned into service in 1989, and the twelfth, HMS Shoreham (M112) was taken into service in November 2001 and commissioned in summer 2002.
- Royal Saudi Navy, similar minehunter ships were powered by the inline-six cylinder Valenta engine.

V8 – 8RP200

- BP, a diesel generator gen-set used for primary electricity generation was built by Paxman in 1983, using a V8 Valenta engine. They were used on platforms (gas rigs) in their Morecambe Bay gas production platform off coast of Blackpool in the north-west of England. Following the subsequent commissioning of a gas turbine powered gen-set for primary electricity generation, the Valenta engined gen-set remains for emergency stand-by electricity generation.

V12 – 12RP200

- British Rail (BR), Class 43 for the InterCity 125 aka High Speed Train (HST), more than 230 Valenta 12RP200L engines supplied, producing 2,250 brake horsepower (1,680 kilowatts; 2,280 metric horsepower) at 1,500 rpm.
- Australian State Rail Authority, twenty-four Valenta engines rated at 2,000 brake horsepower (1,491 kilowatts; 2,028 metric horsepower) were supplied for nineteen power cars for the New South Wales XPT (Express Passenger Train).
- Royal Navy, Type 23 frigate, Duke class ASW (anti-submarine warfare), four per boat, used for the power module, each produces 1.3 megawatts (1,700 horsepower), 60 Hz at 1,200 rpm; sixteen Duke class ships were constructed, the first was completed Spring 1986.
- HM Customs & Excise, two V12 Valentas, brake power rated at 1,900 kilowatts (2,600 metric horsepower; 2,500 brake horsepower) at 1,500 rpm were supplied by Paxman for HMCC Sentinel, a Vosper Thornycroft built 34 metres (112 feet) customs cutter.
- BP, a diesel generator gen-set used for primary electricity generation was built by Paxman in 1983, using a V12 Valenta engine. They were used on platforms (gas rigs) in their Morecambe Bay gas production platform off coast of Blackpool in the north-west of England. Following the subsequent commissioning of a gas turbine powered gen-set for primary electricity generation, the Valenta engined gen-set remains for emergency stand-by electricity generation.

V16 – 16RP200

- Royal Navy, Upholder Class submarines, two 16RPA200SZ engines per boat, each producing 2,035 shaft horsepower (1.517 megawatts). Four boats built, the last built, HMS Unicorn (S43), was commissioned in 1993. All have now been withdrawn from Royal Navy service, and were sold to Canada, now operated by the Royal Canadian Navy.
- United States Coastguard, Island class patrol boats, two engines each; Paxman supplied an initial order forty-eight V16 Valenta engines in 1984-1985, with a continuous rating of 2,880 brake horsepower (2.15 megawatts) at 1,500 rpm and a sprint rating of 3,100 brake horsepower (2.3 megawatts). A total of 37 Island class boats were constructed, each with two engines installed.
- United States Navy, Cyclone Class Patrol Boat coastal craft, four 16RP200-1-CM engines per boat, each rated at 3,350 brake horsepower (2.50 megawatts) at 1,500 rpm (continuous), with a sprint rating of 3,600 brake horsepower (2.7 megawatts) at 1,540 rpm; thirty-two Valenta engines were supplied by Paxman, the first four 'boat set' delivered from Colchester in March 1991, to be installed in USS Cyclone. At least 60 Paxman Valenta engines have been supplied for fourteen Cyclone class boats.
- Hong Kong, two fast ferries, Cheung Kong and Ju Kong were each fitted with four V16 Valenta engines, rated at 3,000 brake horsepower (2.2 megawatts).
- BP, two diesel generator gen-sets used for stand-by electricity generation were built by Paxman in 1981, each using a V16 Valenta engine. They were used on platforms (oil rigs) in their Magnus oilfield in the North Sea.
- BP, a diesel generator gen-set used for primary electricity generation was built by Paxman in 1983, using a V16 Valenta engine. They were used on platforms (gas rigs) in their Morecambe Bay gas production platform off coast of Blackpool in the north-west of England. Following the subsequent commissioning of a gas turbine powered gen-set for primary electricity generation, the Valenta engined gen-set remains for emergency stand-by electricity generation.

V18 – 18RP200

- South Korea, two V18 Valenta engines were supplied for Han Ma Eum Ho launched in 1992, a high speed catamaran built by Hyundai Heavy Industries. Each engine is rated at 4,050 brake horsepower (3.02 megawatts), and is used to power the ship's water jet propulsion system.
