= Terry Miller (engineer) =

English railway engineer (1911–1989)

- Born: 21 August 1911; Barnet, Middlesex, England
- Died: 1989 (aged 77–78); Hertfordshire, England
- Engineering career
- Discipline: Locomotive engineer
- Employer(s): London & North Eastern Railway, British Rail
- Projects: InterCity 125

Terence Charles Barry Miller, MBE (21 August 1911 – 1989) was an English railway engineer who rose to become Chief Engineer (Traction & Rolling Stock) for British Rail.

== Career ==
Miller began his career with the London & North Eastern Railway (LNER) as an apprentice, working under Sir Nigel Gresley. He rose up the ranks of LNER and continued his career under British Rail (BR) after nationalisation. In the 1956 New Year Honours list, he was awarded the MBE. At that time the Assistant Motive Power Superintendent of the Eastern Region of British Railways. By the 1960s, when BR was withdrawing steam locomotives and dismantling facilities for them, Miller was one of several people who provided support to Alan Pegler in his attempts to run the preserved Flying Scotsman.

He was appointed Chief Engineer (Traction & Rolling Stock) in 1968. It was in this position that Miller was credited with instigating the development of the InterCity 125, known as the High Speed Train (HST). At the time, BR was focused on developing an electric Advanced Passenger Train (APT), but by 1969 the APT project was significantly behind schedule. As a stop-gap measure, engineers devised plans for a 125-mile-per-hour (200 km/h) "High Speed Diesel Train", which Miller submitted to the British Railways Board (BRB) at the beginning of 1969; the submission won the endorsement of Henry Johnson, chairman of BRB. The HSDT eventually became the InterCity 125, introduced into service from 1975. Although the HST was intended to fill in for the APT, the APT project was eventually abandoned and the HST remained in service for over 40 years; a pahsed withdrawal began in 2017.

Miller retired in 1973, three years before the HST entered service. He died in 1989.

== Legacy ==
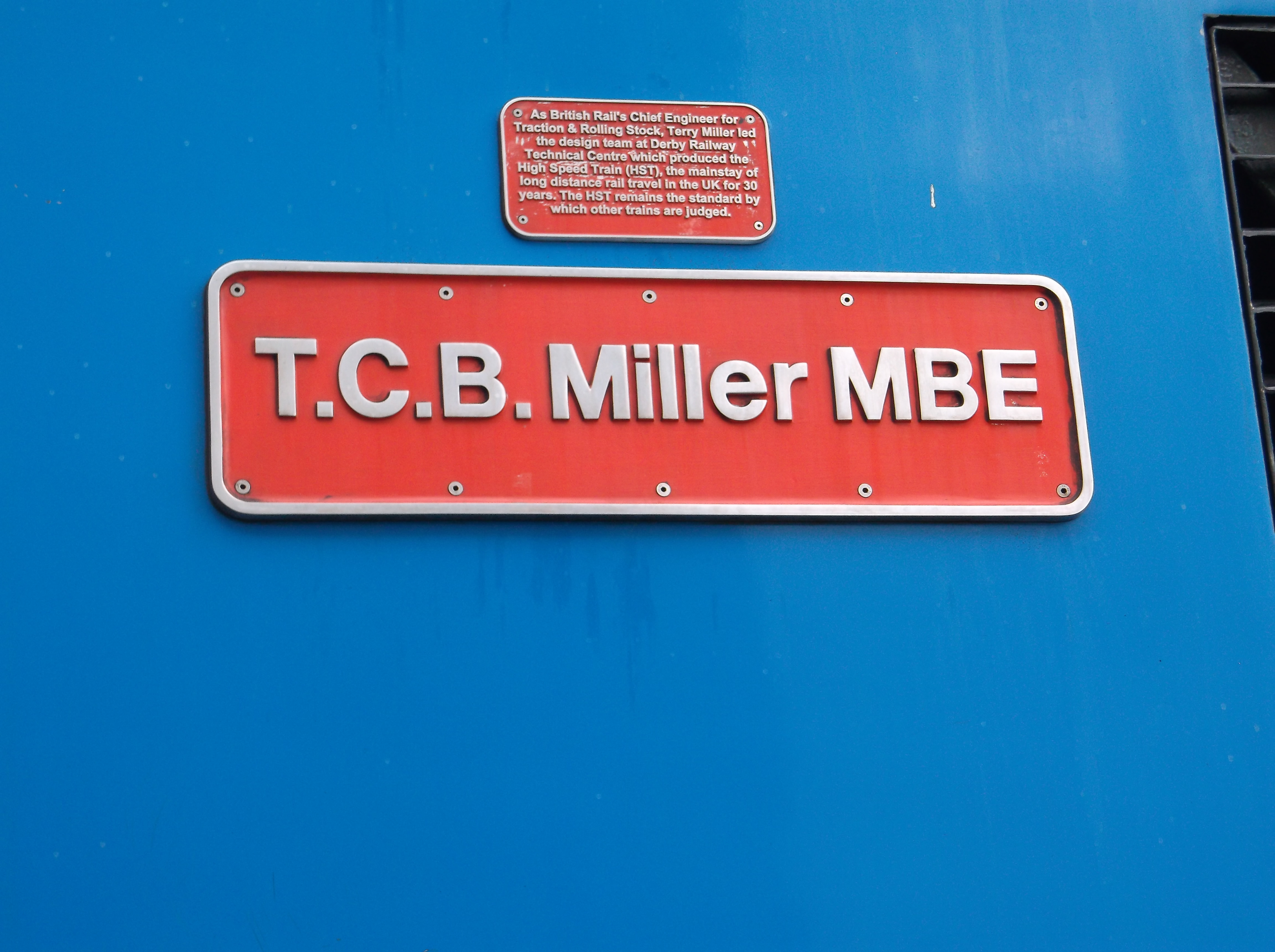
Nameplate on HST power car no. 43048

In 2008, East Midlands Trains named HST power car 43048 T.C.B. Miller MBE in his honour.

In 2011, preservation group 125 Group launched "Project Miller", named in Miller's honour. The project returned the remaining prototype HST power car, number 41001, back to working order at Neville Hill TMD in 2014 after years of static display in the National Railway Museum in York.
