= British Rail Class 252 =

Experimental British high speed train

British Rail Class 252 Prototype HST
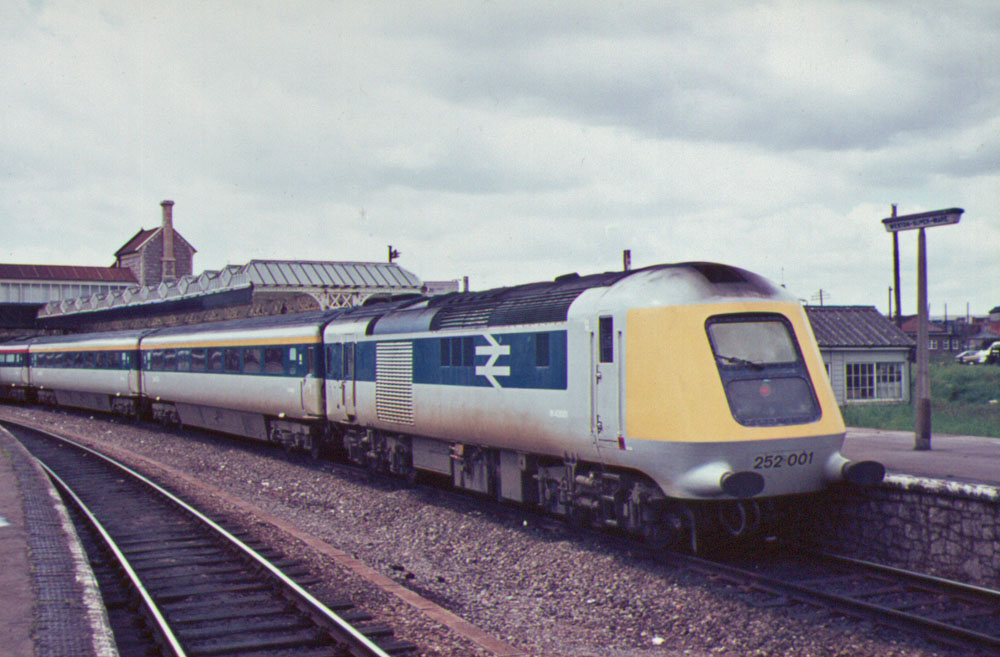
- Class 252 at Weston-super-Mare in 1975
- In service: 1972–1982
- Manufacturer: British Rail Engineering Limited
- Built at: Crewe Works
- Family name: High Speed Train
- Constructed: 1972
- Scrapped: 1990–93 (partly)
- Number built: 1 set
- Number in service: 9 carriages
- Number preserved: 1 power car
- Number scrapped: 1 power car, 1 carriage
- Formation: Two power cars flanking Mark 3 carriages
- Fleet numbers: 252001
- Operator: British Rail
- Line served: Western Region

Specifications
- Car body construction: Steel fully integral, monocoque
- Car length: 56 ft 4 in (17.17 m)
- Width: 8 ft 11 in (2.72 m)
- Height: 12 ft 10 in (3.91 m)
- Doors: Hinged slam, centrally locked/automatic plug doors, centrally locked
- Maximum speed: 143.2 mph (230.5 km/h)
- Weight: 68.5 tonnes (67.4 long tons; 75.5 short tons)
- Prime movers: Paxman Valenta 12RP200L, 2 off
- Power supply: 3-phase 415/240 V (Mark 3); 1,000 V DC (Mark 3A/B)
- Bogies: BREL BT10
- Braking systems: Disc, air operated
- Track gauge: 1,435 mm (4 ft 8 1/2 in) standard gauge

Class 252 was the classification allocated to the prototype High Speed Train (HST) unit, numbered 252001.

== History ==
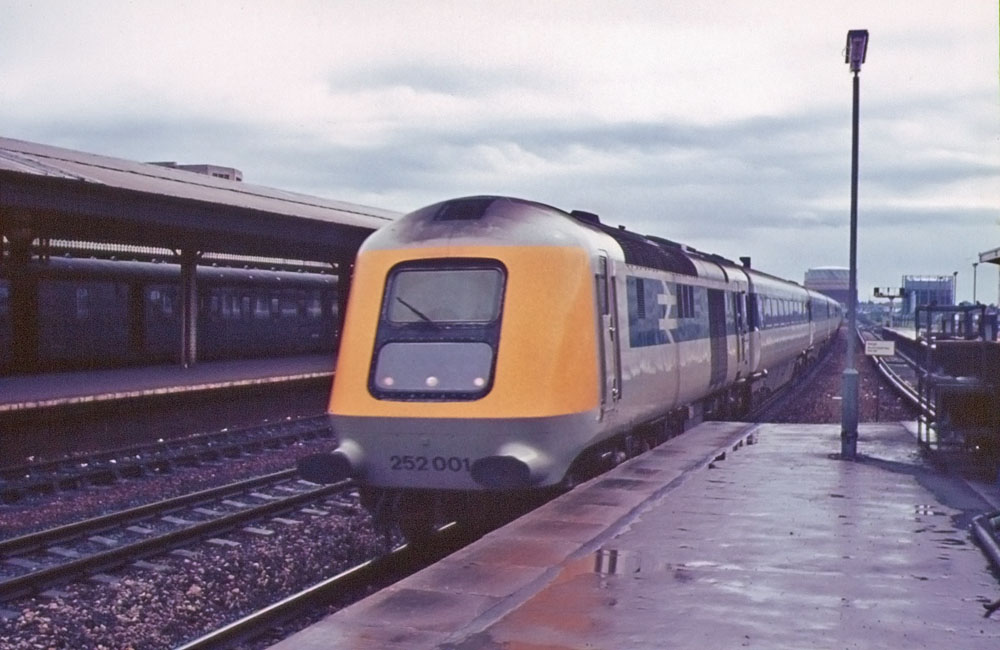
Class 252 at Reading in 1975

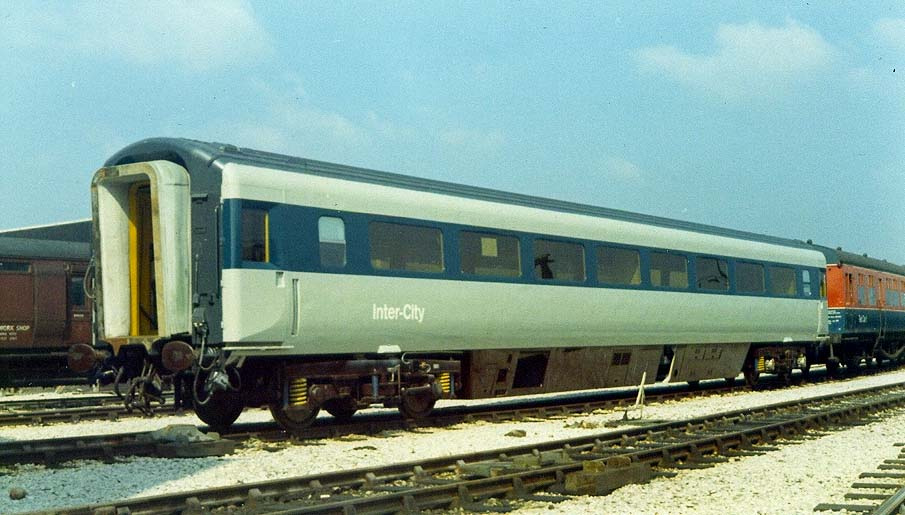
One of the first Mark 3 carriages No:E12000 to be delivered to the Railway Technical Centre, Derby in 1972

When originally built, in 1972, the prototype High Speed Train (HST) units were considered to be formed of two locomotives at either end of a rake of carriages. As a result, the power cars were designated Class 41 and numbered 41001/41002, while the carriages were given numbers in the new Mark 3 carriage number series.

The 125 Group restored prototype powercar 41001 back to operational condition in 2013. This entailed a complete restoration of the vehicle and a fitment of a Paxman Valenta engine at Neville Hill TMD. The engine was successfully started in July 2013, and on 31 May 2014 the loco moved under its own power for the first time in over 30 years.
