= InterCity 125 =

British high-speed diesel passenger train

InterCity 125 or High Speed Train (HST)
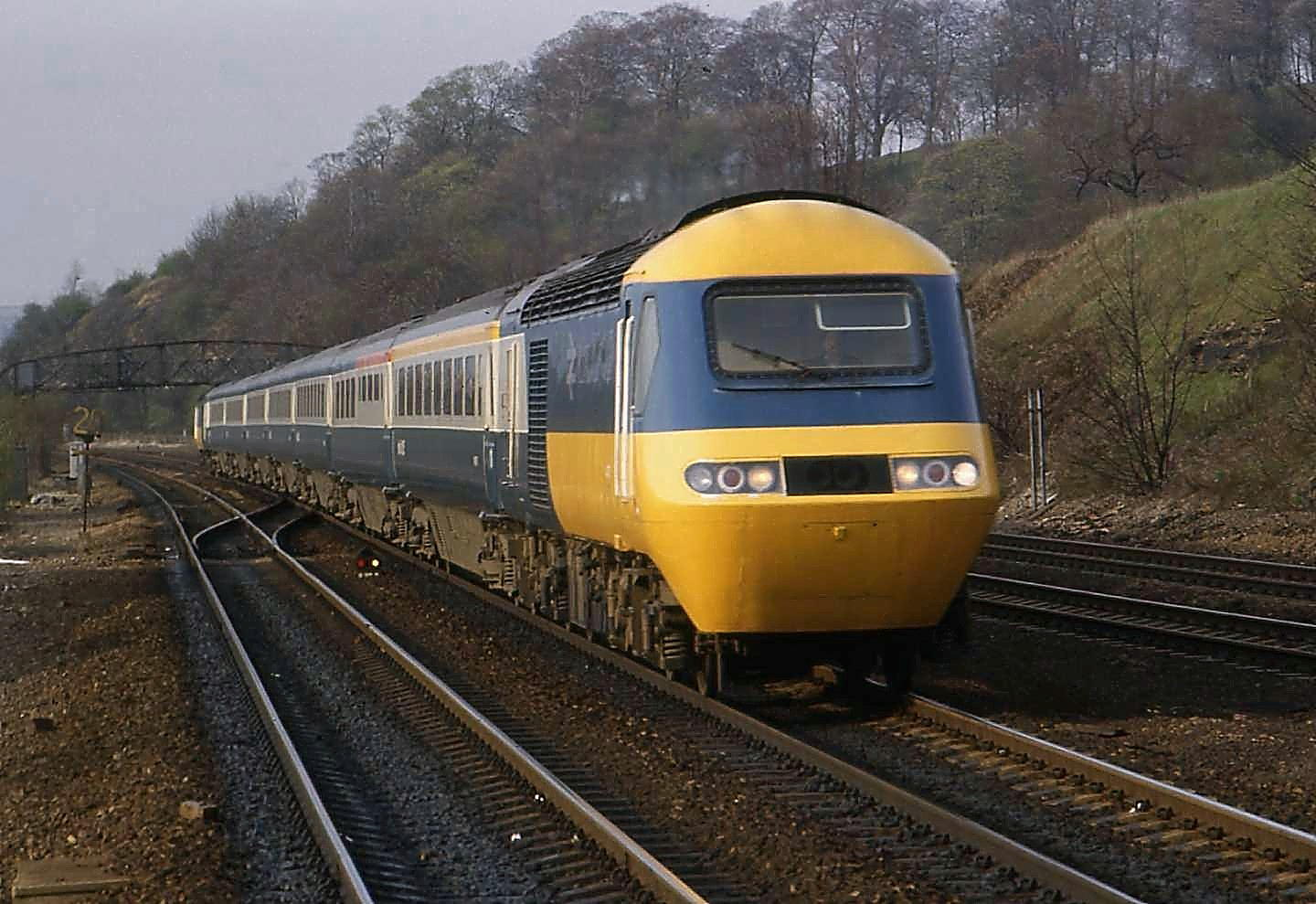
- An InterCity 125 in original British Rail livery
Type and origin
- Power type: Diesel-electric
- Build date: 1975–1982
Specifications
- Configuration
  - UIC: Bo'Bo' + 2'2' + ... + 2'2' + Bo'Bo'
Performance figures
- Maximum speed: 125 mph (200 km/h)
- Power output: Engine: 2x 2,250 bhp (1,678 kW)
- Tractive effort: Maximum: 2x 17,980 lbf (80.0 kN); Continuous: 2x 10,340 lbf (46.0 kN) @64.5 mph (104 km/h)
Career
- Operators: Current: ScotRail (since 2018); Interoceanic Corridor of the Isthmus of Tehuantepec (since 2023); Network Rail (since 2003); Colas Rail (since 2007); Data Acquisition & Testing Services (DATS); Romic Group (Since 2025); Former: British Rail (1976–1997); Great Western Trains (1996–1998); Virgin Trains West Coast (1997–2004); Virgin CrossCountry (1997–2003, 2005); CrossCountry (2007-2023); Midland Mainline (1996–2007); Cotswold Rail (2000–2010); GNER (1996–2007); National Express East Coast (2007–2009); East Coast (2009–2015); Virgin Trains East Coast (2015–2018); London North Eastern Railway (2018–2019); Grand Central (2007–2017); East Midlands Trains (2007–2019); Hull Trains (2019); East Midlands Railway (2019–2021); Abellio ScotRail (2018–2022); Great Western Railway (1998–2025)
- Disposition: in service

The InterCity 125 (originally Inter-City 125) or High Speed Train (HST) is a diesel-powered high-speed passenger train built by British Rail Engineering Limited between 1975 and 1982. A total of 95 sets were produced, each comprising two Class 43 power cars, one at each end, and a rake of seven or eight Mark 3 coaches. The name is derived from its top operational speed of 125 mph (201 km/h). At times, the sets have been classified as British Rail Classes 253, 254 and 255.

British Rail (BR) initially developed the HST as an interim measure in the early 1970s, as delays and cost concerns began to threaten their primary high-speed train project, the Advanced Passenger Train (APT). The HSTs are now widely considered to be among the most successful trains to have operated on the British railway network, both in terms of their initial impact and their longevity: their introduction into service between 1976 and 1982 resulted in significantly reduced journey times, and large increases in patronage on the routes on which they were operated. The trains proved to be very reliable workhorses, remaining in front-line service for decades. The first withdrawals began in 2017, 41 years after they were introduced. As of December 2025, InterCity 125s remain in service with ScotRail, with one used as an engineering train with Network Rail.

The HST design became the basis for an Australian variant, the Express Passenger Train (XPT), which entered service in New South Wales in 1982.

== Background ==
In the late 1950s and early 1960s, the British Transport Commission (BTC) was modernising its rail network. It wanted to increase intercity speeds so that railways could compete more effectively with motorways. The governments of the time were unwilling to fund dedicated high speed rail infrastructure, as happened in other countries, and so the BTC instead focused on developing new trains which could operate at higher speed using existing infrastructure. A team of engineers was assembled at the Railway Technical Centre in Derby in the early 1960s, to design and develop an Advanced Passenger Train (APT) capable of at least 125 miles per hour (201 km/h) incorporating many features not previously seen on British railways—such as tilting to allow higher speeds on curves.

The APT project suffered repeated delays and in 1970, the British Railways Board (BRB) decided it would not be sufficiently developed to enter public service until well into the next decade, so a stopgap solution would be needed to reduce journey times in order to compete effectively with other modes of transport. At the instigation of Terry Miller, Chief Engineer (Traction & Rolling Stock), the BRB authorised the development of a high-speed diesel train using tried and tested conventional technology for short-term use, until the APT was able to take over. An operational prototype was to be built by 1972.

== Development ==
=== Concept and design ===
The high-speed diesel train, which became the HST or InterCity 125, was formed of a rake of Mark 3 passenger coaches between two streamlined power cars, one at each end. Each power car was fitted with a Paxman Valenta diesel engine which could produce 2,250 horsepower (1,680 kW). This engine was chosen due to its light weight, and consequent high power-to-weight ratio. The decision to use two power cars was taken early in the project as design engineers calculated that the train would need 4,500 horsepower (3,400 kW) to sustain 125 mph on the routes for which it was designed (the Great Western Main Line, East Coast Main Line, Midland Main Line, and the Cross Country Route), and it was established that no "off-the-shelf" diesel engine was capable of producing such power.

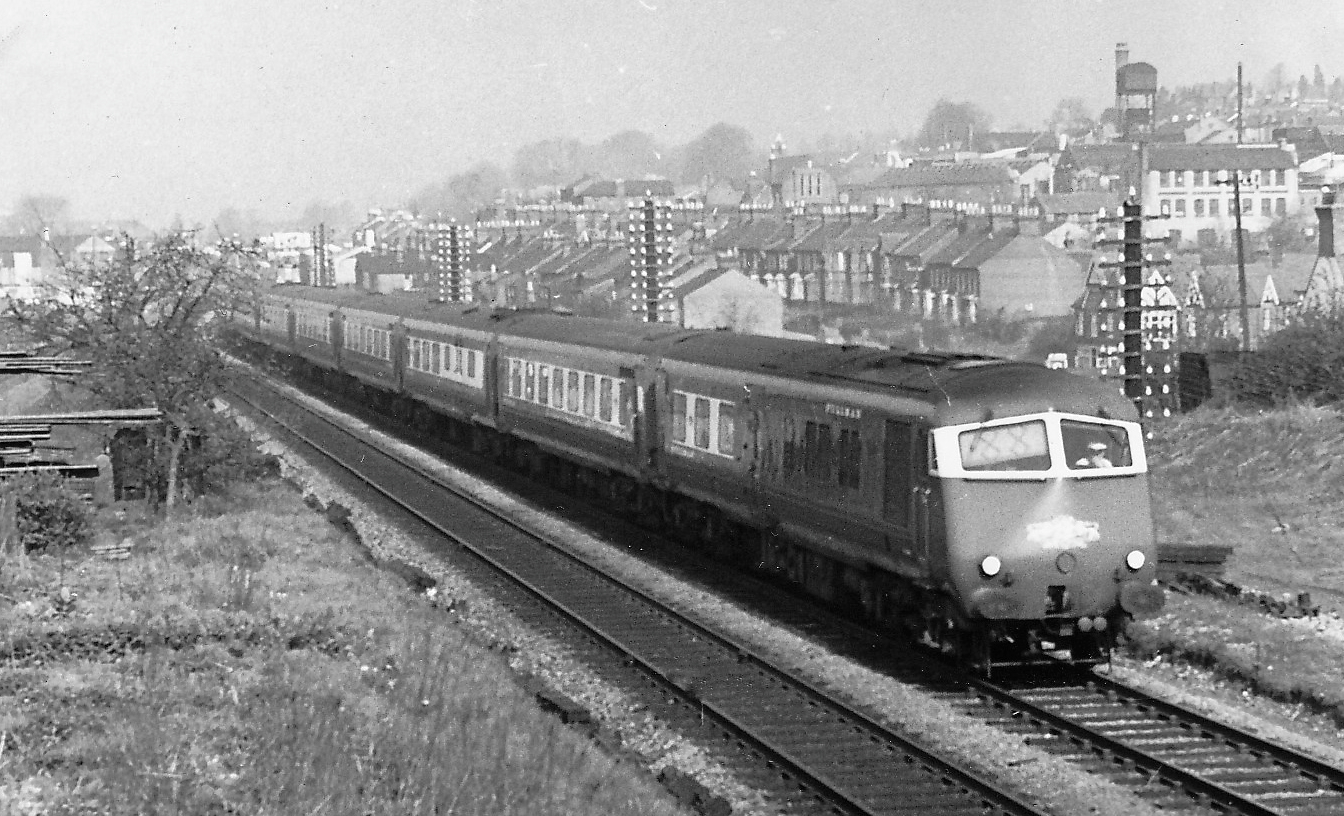
The Blue Pullmans, which were in service between 1960 and 1973, are often seen as forerunners of the HSTs.

British Rail had used a similar idea of a train with integral power cars at each end a decade earlier, with their Blue Pullman sets; although these trains were not ultimately commercially successful, they established the validity of the idea, and are often seen as forerunners of the HSTs. The concept had several advantages; firstly, a power car at each end allowed the train to be driven from either end in push–pull formation with the power cars linked by electronic control systems, and therefore reverse direction without the need for a locomotive to be run around at terminus stations, secondly, the train could run with only one power car operational, though at reduced speed, therefore allowing a journey to continue in the event of a breakdown, and thirdly, it avoided the underfloor diesel engines found in diesel multiple units, therefore avoiding noise and vibration for passengers. Another factor was that two locomotives operating in push–pull formation, would cause less wear on the rails than a single locomotive. One of the design requirements for the HST was that it should exert no more force on the track at 125 mph, than a Class 55 'Deltic' locomotive at 100 mph, and each power car of the HST weighed a modest 70 tons which allowed it to meet this requirement.

One of the key design requirements for the HSTs was that they should be able to run at 125 mph on existing infrastructure. In order to achieve this, they had to be able to come to a stop from 125 mph within existing signal spacings, which required a high performance braking system to be developed. This was achieved by a high performance disc brake system, in place of the clasp brakes used on traditional stock.

=== Prototype ===
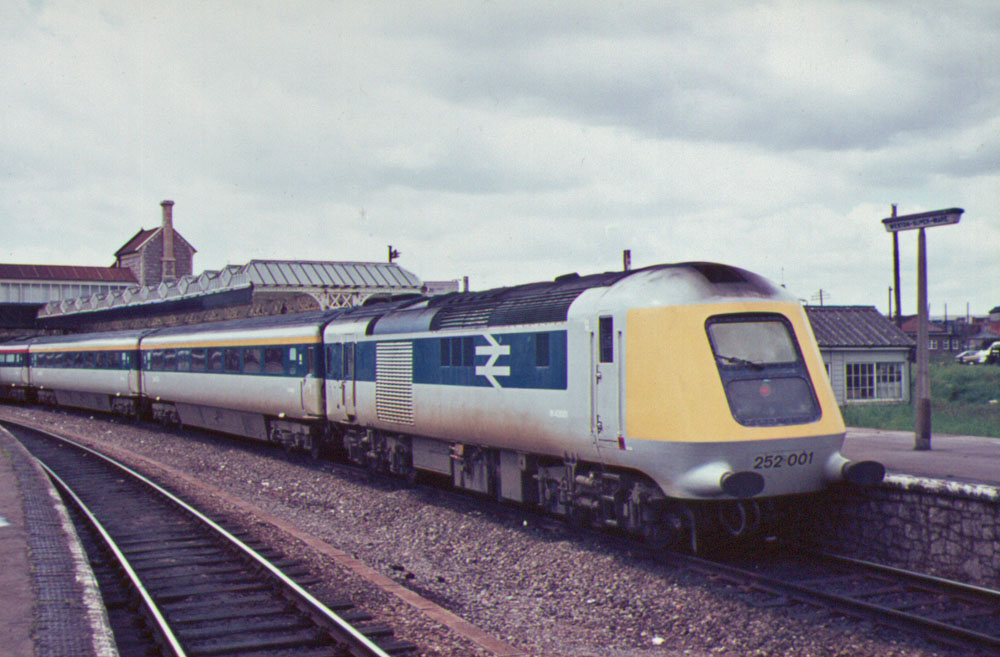
Class 252 prototype HST at Weston-super-Mare in 1975

To prove the concept, British Rail produced a prototype. The framework of the new locomotive, classified British Rail Class 41, was built at Crewe Works and transferred to Derby Litchurch Lane Works for completion. The design incorporated a driving desk around the centrally seated driver, a sound-proofed door between the cab and the engine room, and, unusually, no side windows. The prototype was the first diesel locomotive in British railway history to use AC alternators in place of a DC generator, with the output converted to DC when used for traction.

The prototype train of seven coaches and two locomotives was completed in August 1972 and in the autumn was running trials on the main line. The following year, high-speed testing was undertaken on the "racing stretch" of the East Coast Main Line between York and Darlington. The set was reduced to two power cars and five trailers, and there was a concerted attempt to see how fast the train would go. On 6 June 1973, 131 mph (211 km/h) was reached, which was bettered as the days passed. On 12 June, a world diesel speed record of 143.2 mph (230.5 km/h) was achieved, and the drivers believed that 150 mph was possible, but the BRB issued instructions for the high speed tests to cease. It was believed at the time that this was because the BRB wanted to promote the APT as the future of high speed rail travel in the UK.

The fixed-formation concept was proven in trial running between 1973 and 1976, and British Rail went on to build 95 sets of production HSTs to transform InterCity services.

=== Production versions ===
Manufacturing of the production power car sets began in 1974 at the Crewe Works, with the Mark 3 coaches being manufactured at the Derby Litchurch Lane Works. The first production power car, numbered 43002, was delivered in late 1975. The production versions were mechanically very similar to the prototype, but differed considerably in appearance: the streamlined wedge-shaped front end lacked conventional buffers, and the drawgear was hidden under a cowling. The single cab front window was much wider than the prototype's, and side windows were included. Unlike the prototype, no driving position was included at the inner end, as the power cars were originally intended to operate in fixed formation.

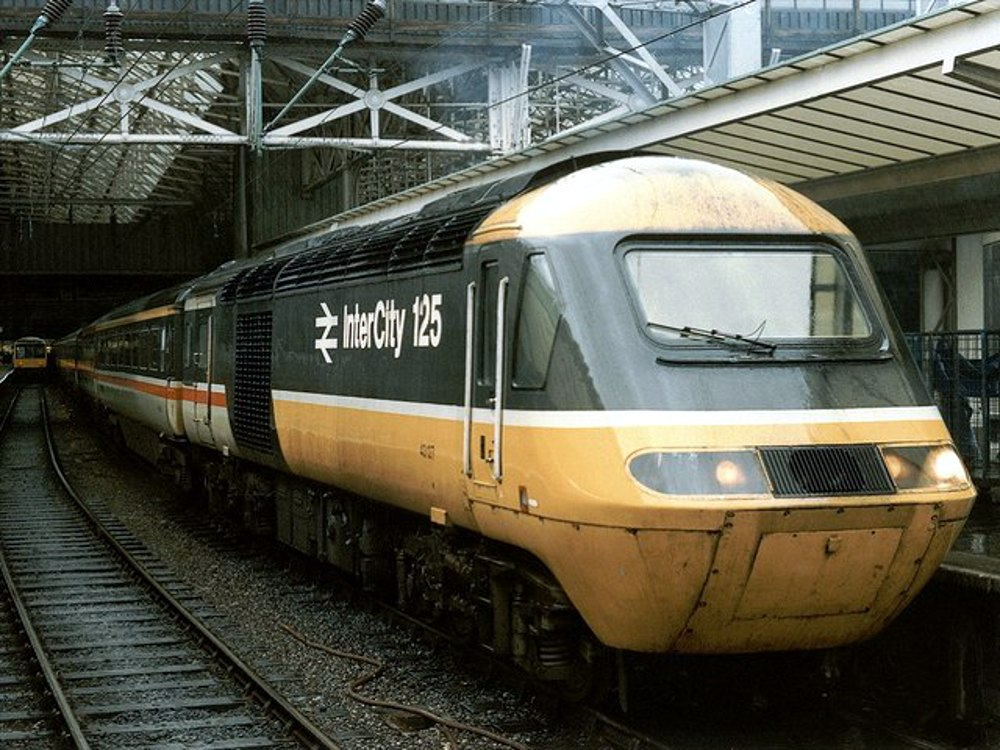
An InterCity 125 about to depart Manchester Piccadilly in 1986

The train's appearance is the work of British industrial designer Kenneth Grange who was approached by British Rail to design the livery, but under his own impetus, and without telling anyone, decided to redesign the body. He worked with an aerodynamic engineer, and they built and tested a model in a wind tunnel. "It really was rather quite brutal, rather clumsy. I thought, 'Oh I'd like to get my hands on that', although the brief was nothing to do with the shape, absolutely not at all." He presented the new design to British Rail and persuaded them to adopt it. In 2016 GWR renamed 43002 "Sir Kenneth Grange" in his honour, at the same time returning it to its original blue and yellow paint scheme. After being withdrawn from GWR service, 43002 was acquired by the National Collection in November 2019 and was displayed at the National Railway Museum in York.

43002 Sir Kenneth Grange at York National Railway Museum

The redesigned front end also had the advantage of easing union acceptance of the train: the railway union ASLEF had objected to the prototype's lack of space for a secondman to sit alongside the driver, and had refused to operate the prototype in public service. The cab on the production version was wide enough to accommodate two people, and so was able to overcome these objections.

An InterCity 125 consists of two Class 43 diesel-electric power cars, each powered originally by 2,250 bhp (1,678 kW) Paxman Valenta engines (they have since been fitted with different engines), and a set of six to nine Mark 3 coaches.

Key features of the design are the high power-to-weight ratio of the locomotives (1678 kW per ~70-tonne loco), which were built for high-speed passenger travel, improved crashworthiness over previous models, and bi-directional running avoiding the need for the locomotive to run around at terminating stations. Until the HST's introduction, the speed of British diesel-powered trains was limited to 100 mph (161 km/h). The HST allowed a 25% increase in service speeds along many of the lines on which they operated.

Lighter axle loading allowed the trains to travel faster than conventional services along lines not suited to full-speed running, such as Edinburgh to Aberdeen. Coupled with superior acceleration over older locomotives, this allowed substantial cuts in journey times. The increased speed and rapid acceleration and deceleration of the HST made it ideal for passenger use.

== British Rail service ==
=== Introduction into service ===
Deliveries continued in 1976, and on 4 October a partial service of HSTs running at 125 mph (201 km/h) began on the Western Region, from London Paddington, on the Great Western and South Wales Main Lines. The radical update of the standard BR livery on the power cars was complemented by the 'Inter-City 125' branding, which also appeared on timetables and promotional literature. By the start of the summer timetable in May 1977, the full complement of 27 Class 253 sets (253001–253027) was in service on the Western Region, replacing locomotive-hauled trains on the Bristol and South Wales routes. Passenger numbers rapidly increased due to the speed and frequency of the services. The displacement by HSTs of Class 50 locomotives to slower services effectively finished off the last Class 52 diesel-hydraulics by early 1977.

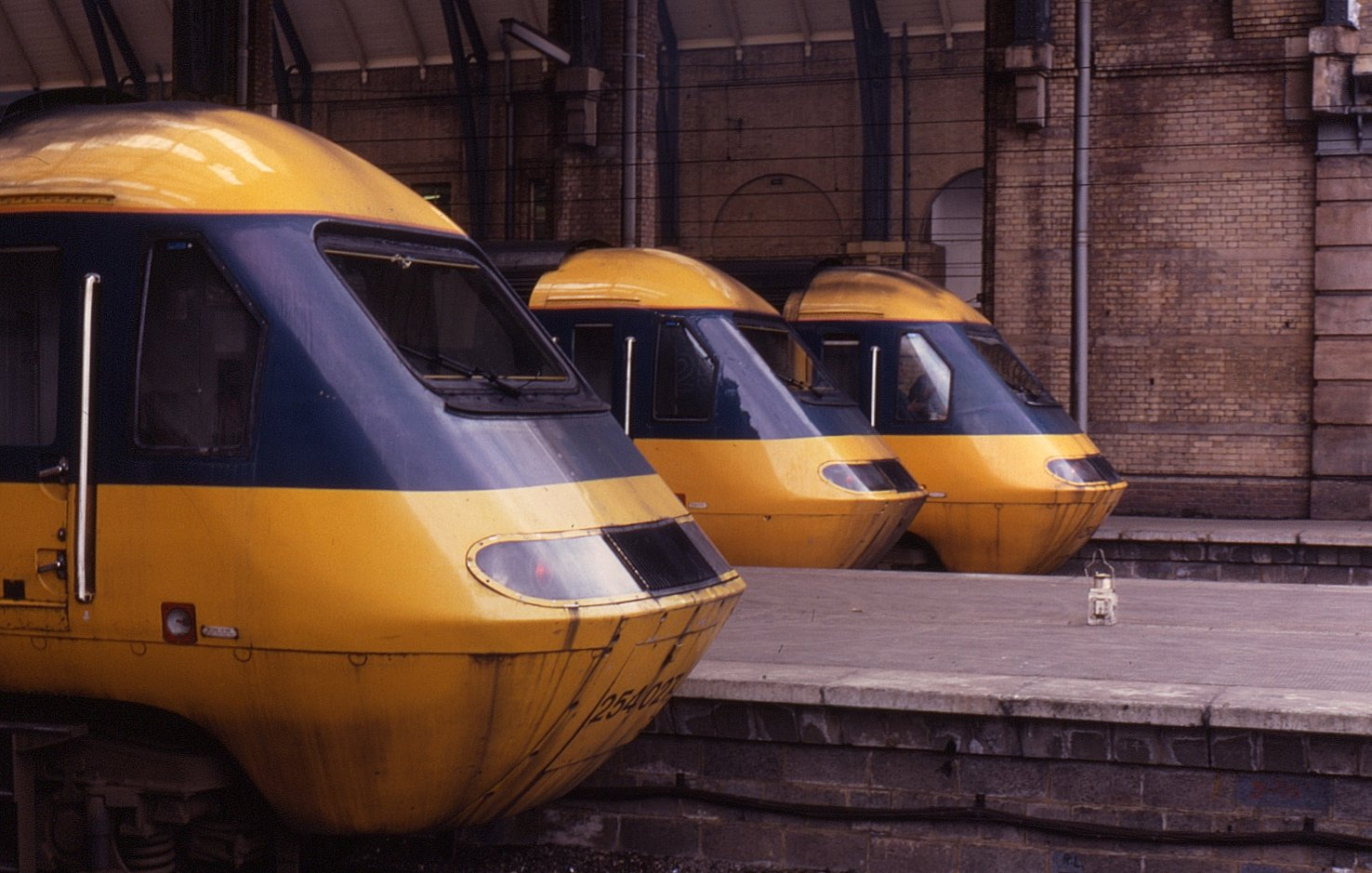
The cab fronts of three HSTs at London King's Cross in 1981

The production of Class 254 continued through 1977 for East Coast Main Line (ECML) services. The HSTs allocated to the ECML had eight coaches instead of seven on the Western Region, and British Rail had originally planned to fit uprated 2,500 bhp (1,900 kW) Valenta engines to the longer HSTs, but this was not carried out, as it was found that the engine's coolant system would struggle to deal with the extra heat produced by a higher powered engine. The first 125 mph East Coast HST services were introduced for the summer timetable in May 1978, with HSTs taking over Flying Scotsman and other services. The previous generation of Class 55 'Deltic' locomotives were relegated to secondary duties, before being withdrawn entirely in late 1981. A full HST timetable for the ECML was due to be introduced in May 1979, but was delayed until late August due to the Penmanshiel Tunnel collapse. The HSTs reduced the London-Edinburgh journey time by up to an hour.

In 1979, HST services began in South West England, to destinations such as Exeter, Plymouth and Penzance, and in 1981 they were introduced to the Cross Country Route via Birmingham New Street. In 1982 HSTs were introduced to Midland Main Line services from London St Pancras: Although the HSTs were mostly limited to a top speed of 100 miles per hour (160 km/h) on those routes, their increased acceleration still reduced journey times.

Ninety-five HST sets, including 197 Class 43 powercars, were built between 1976 and 1982. More Mark 3 trailer cars were built in the 1980s for the Western Region Class 253s, making them eight-car rakes in common with East Coast and Midland Main Line services. During the 1990s only the Cross-Country sets remained as seven-car rakes, with just one first-class coach.

One of the main selling points of the new HST services were the increase in speed and comfort without any increase in fares. The HST brought considerable improvements in service, and British Rail began active marketing to support the train's introduction. The InterCity service was a great success for British Rail.

==== Journey time reductions ====
One of the main selling points of the HSTs were the reductions they could achieve in journey times, with the trains being marketed in publicity material as 'The Journey Shrinker'. In 1973 British Rail produced a promotional booklet entitled Speed for the Seventies in which they laid out the expected journey times to be achieved with HSTs compared to the then extant timings.

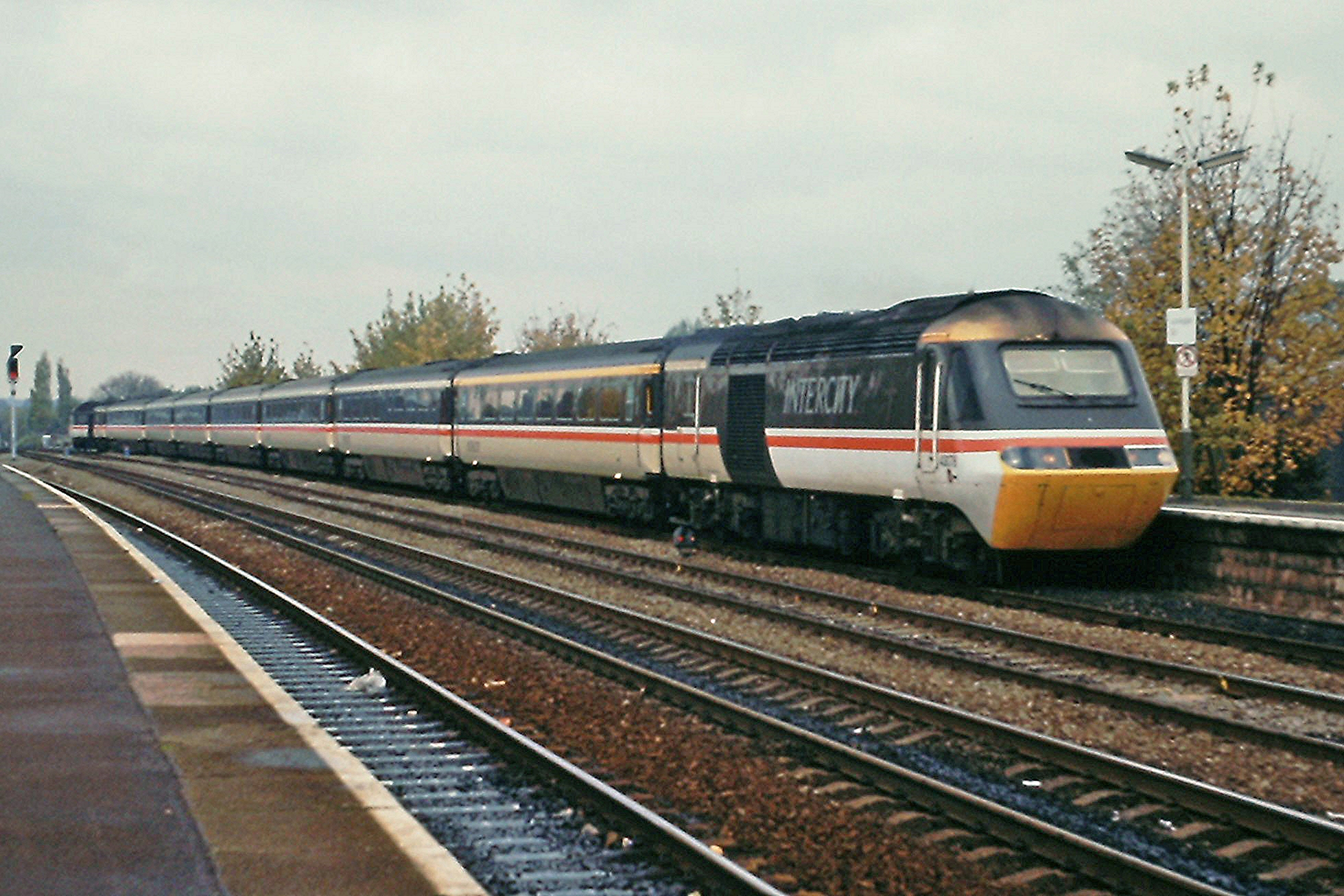
An HST set in the later InterCity livery at Leamington Spa in 1992

Journey times from London 1973				Proposed HST times		
Place	Distance (miles & km)	Time h.m	Average Speed	Time h.m	Average Speed	Time savings
Bath	107 mi (172 km)	1.38	66 mph (106 km/h)	1.11	90 mph (140 km/h)	27m
Bristol	118 mi (190 km)	1.50	65 mph (105 km/h)	1.22	87 mph (140 km/h)	28m
Cardiff	145 mi (233 km)	2.11	67 mph (108 km/h)	1.46	82 mph (132 km/h)	25m
Doncaster	156 mi (251 km)	2.04	75 mph (121 km/h)	1.39	95 mph (153 km/h)	25m
York	188 mi (303 km)	2.22	79 mph (127 km/h)	2.00	94 mph (151 km/h)	22m
Leeds	186 mi (299 km)	2.28	75 mph (121 km/h)	2.14	83 mph (134 km/h)	14m
Darlington	232 mi (373 km)	2.52	81 mph (130 km/h)	2.31	92 mph (148 km/h)	21m
Newcastle	268 mi (431 km)	3.38	74 mph (119 km/h)	2.57	91 mph (146 km/h)	41m
Edinburgh	393 mi (632 km)	5.30	71 mph (114 km/h)	4.30	87 mph (140 km/h)	60m

Most of these predictions of the journey times achievable by HSTs proved to be quite accurate, and in some cases they were underestimates. For example, the best timing achieved for London to Bath was 62 minutes, and 115 minutes was achieved for London to York.

=== Proposed electric version ===
In the early 1980s, when electrification of the East Coast Main Line was in its early planning stages, serious consideration was given to producing an electric version of the HST, which would have been known as the HST-E. This would have kept the bodyshell and most of the mechanical components of the diesel version, but the power cars would have been electric locomotives fitted with pantographs. The thinking was, that as the diesel version had been proven, it would be a straightforward way to produce a 125mph trainset. The HST-E was proposed in response to the failure of the Advanced Passenger Train (APT) project. This proposal did not proceed, and BR instead developed a new electric trainset which would become the 140 mph (230 km/h) capable InterCity 225 to work the electrified services on the ECML, which came into service in the late-1980s.

=== World records ===
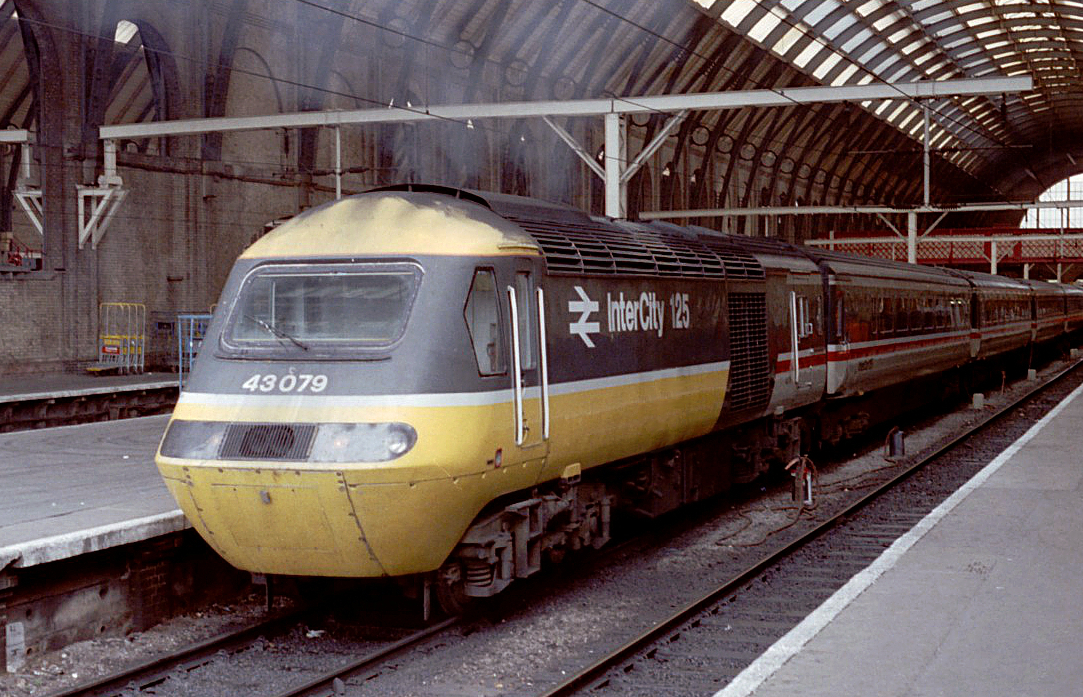
InterCity 125 at King's Cross in 1988

The prototype InterCity 125 (power cars 43000 and 43001) set the world speed record for diesel traction at 143.2 mph (230.5 km/h) on 12 June 1973.

A second world record for the fastest diesel-powered train, a speed of 148 mph (238 km/h), was set by an HST on 1 November 1987, between Darlington and York with a test run for a new type of bogie for use on Mark 4 coaches on the same route. The record run was powered by 43102 (at the front) and 43159 (at the rear).

An HST also holds the world speed record for a diesel train carrying passengers. On 27 September 1985, a special press run for the launch of a new Tees-Tyne Pullman service from Newcastle to London King's Cross, formed of a shortened 2+5 set, briefly touched 144 mph (232 km/h) north of York.

== Regions and operators ==
=== South West England and South Wales ===
On the Western Region, InterCity 125 trains (designated class 253) were introduced on services from London to Bristol and South Wales, and extended to most daytime services from London to Devon and Cornwall. Some South Wales services were extended to Milford Haven, Fishguard and Pembroke in West Wales. Maintenance was provided at Old Oak Common and St Philip's Marsh, and Laira also carried out maintenance after services to Devon and Cornwall were introduced in 1979.

British Rail Class 47 locomotives still operated cross-country services from Cornwall and South Wales to the North-East via the Cross Country Route, and London to the Midlands/Welsh Marches. Class 43s replaced them when the third batch of power cars was delivered in 2+7 formation with two first class coaches, a buffet car, and four second class coaches between two power cars. They were later expanded to a 2+8 formation, with an extra second class coach.

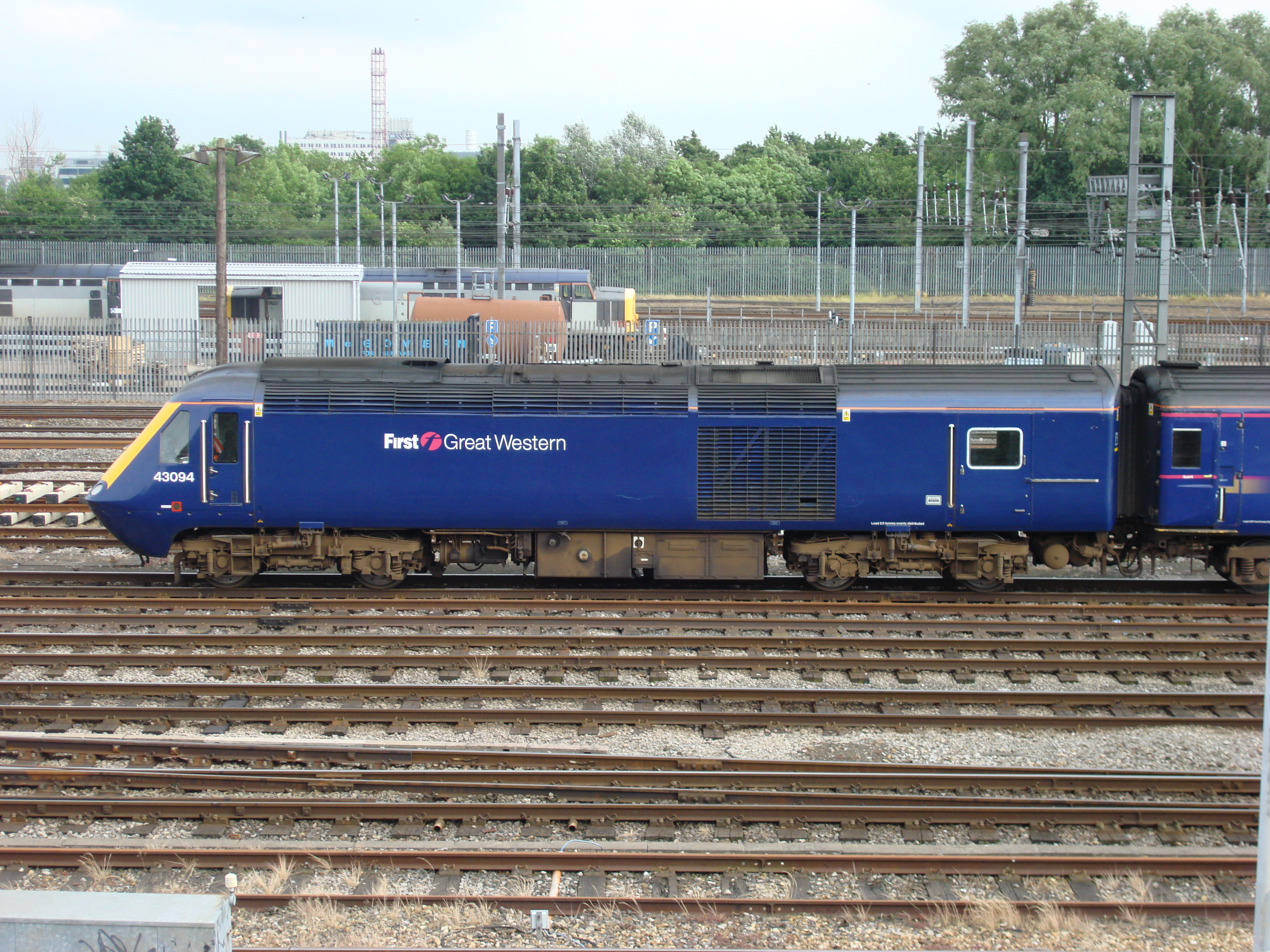
First Great Western HST passing Old Oak Common Train Maintenance Depot in 2007

Great Western Trains was formed out of the privatisation of British Rail and operated the InterCity routes from London Paddington to the west of England. In 1998 FirstGroup acquired Great Western Trains and rebranded it First Great Western. InterCity 125s continued to work the same diagrams they had under British Rail, albeit in a different livery.

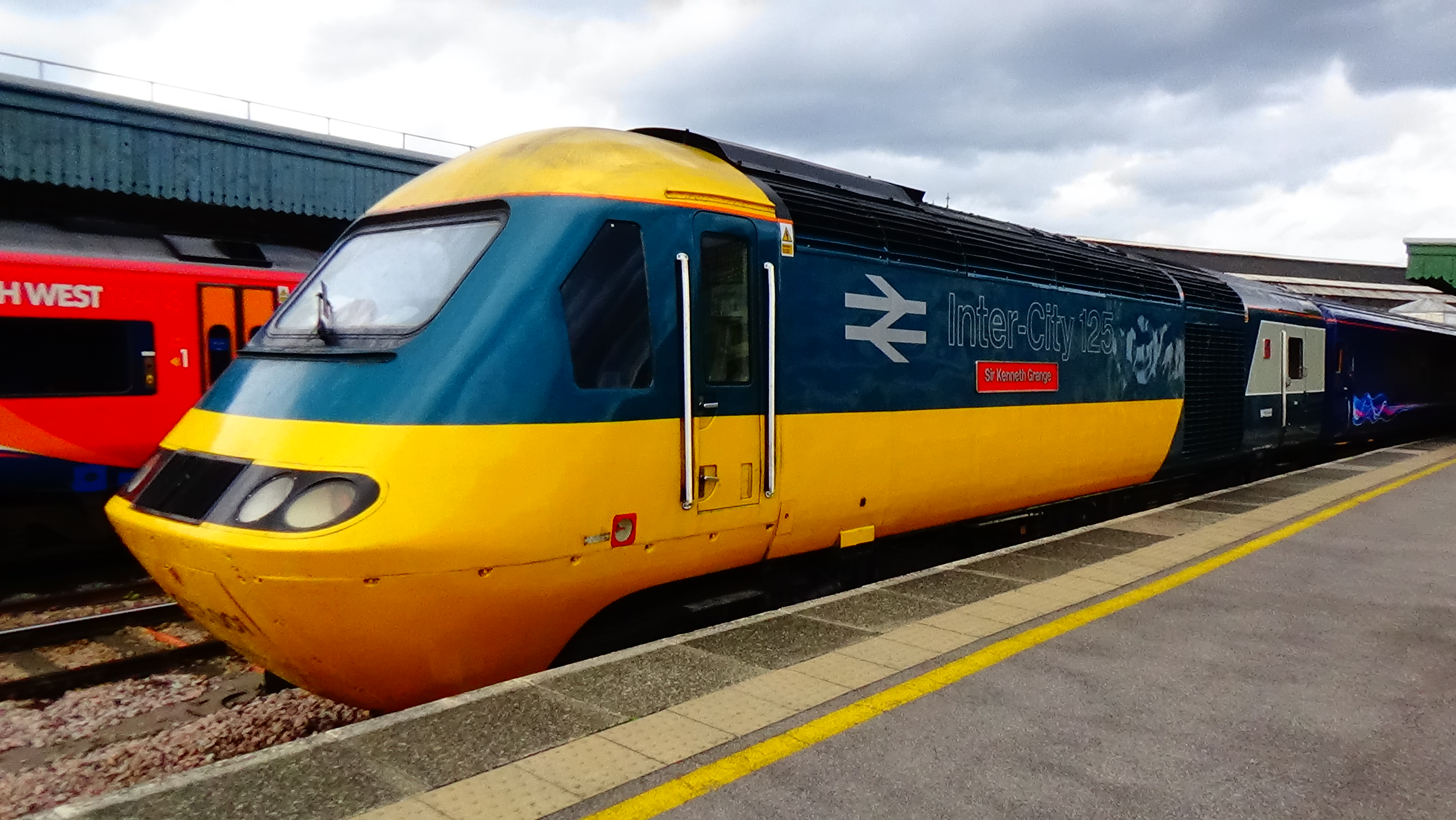
43002 received vinyls of its original livery to celebrate the 40th anniversary of the IC125, and was named after the class's designer, Sir Kenneth Grange

Great Western Railway used 43 HST sets to operate most intercity services from Paddington to Bristol, Bath Spa, Chippenham, Swindon, Cardiff, Swansea, Carmarthen, Cheltenham Spa, Oxford, Worcester, Hereford, Paignton, Plymouth and Penzance, and some commuter services to Westbury, Taunton and Exeter St Davids. In 2012 all First Great Western's intercity services were worked by InterCity 125 sets with the exception of sleeper services and some Cotswold Line services.

From 2005 the First Great Western HSTs were re-engined with MTU power units and the coaches were refurbished. Units for services in the M4 corridor/Thames Valley to Bristol, Hereford, Oxford, Exeter and Cardiff were converted to a high-density layout of mostly airline-style seats in standard class (only two tables per coach) to provide more seats for commuters. The remainder, for routes to Swansea and the West Country, included four tables per standard class coach.

The refurbished coaches had new seating (leather in first class), at-seat power points and a redesigned buffet bar. From 2010, one standard class coach in each set had a Volo TV system, but this was removed in 2014.

Another change was made in 2014, when some first class coaches were converted to standard class or composite (half standard and half first class), leaving 1 1/2 first class coaches per set. The first class coaches were refurbished in a more luxurious style, and many tables with one seat each side in first class were replaced by individual airline-style seats.

By mid-2019, Great Western Railway no longer had any HSTs operating service to or from Paddington, having replaced all of them with Class 800 and Class 802.

Great Western Railway retained 24 powercars and 48 coaches to form 11 four-coach sets for use on local services between Cardiff and Penzance, replacing the British Rail Class 158. However, by the end of 2022 these sets were proving expensive to operate and increasingly difficult to maintain due to their age. With spare Class 802 sets post-Covid being able to fill in on the route, in December 2022 GWR announced plans to withdraw all of the HST Castle sets from use by December 2023. Whilst leased vehicles were returned to Angel Trains, four directly owned 2+4 Castle sets have been retained by GWR, with plans to retain them until at least December 2024. GWR officially retired its final Castle Class locomotive on 14 December 2025, with a round trip between Plymouth and Penzance.

=== Eastern England and Scotland ===
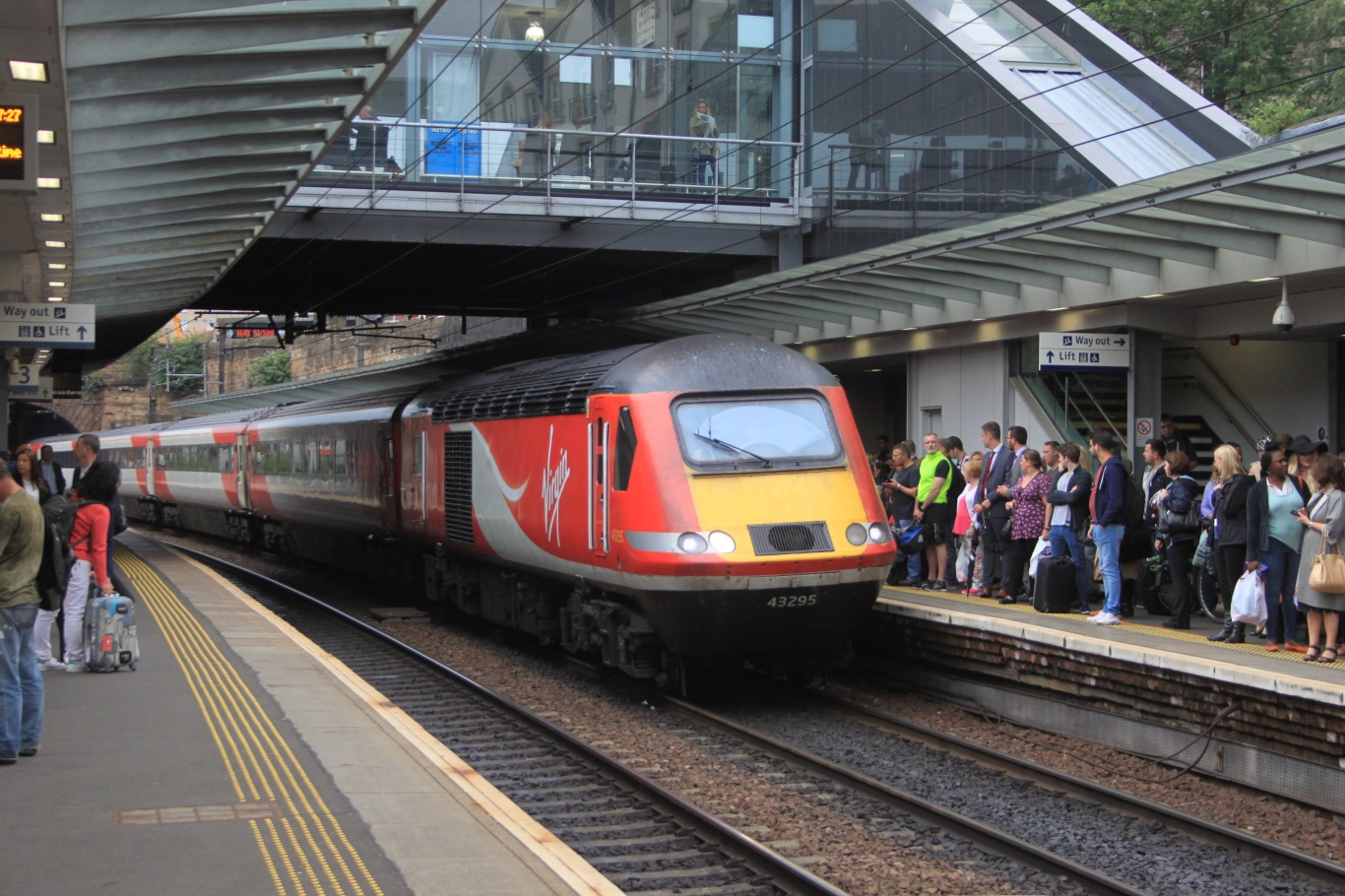
Highland Chieftain InterCity 125 arriving at Haymarket in 2016

On the East Coast Main Line, the InterCity 125 designated Class 254 was the staple stock after the retirement of the Class 55 Deltic locomotives in 1980–1982, until the introduction of InterCity 225 following electrification in 1990. They were concentrated on services from London King's Cross to Newcastle and Edinburgh Waverley, and to Glasgow Queen Street, Inverness and Aberdeen. In the months following the Penmanshiel Tunnel collapse in 1979, London to Scotland services ran via the Tyne Valley line from Newcastle to Carlisle then to Scotland via the West Coast Main Line. HSTs were also used on some services from London to Leeds, Bradford Forster Square, Cleethorpes, Hull and Scarborough.

The East Coast (ECML) formation was originally 2 + 8, increased to 2 + 9 in 2002 when extra stock became available. The ECML formation was two first-class coaches, one buffet (with 1st Class seating) and five (later six) standard-class coaches between the buffet and power cars. For a few years, formations included a TRUK (trailer restaurant kitchen) and buffet car, a TS (trailer second class) and TF (trailer first class) coaches, many formations were 4 × TS, TRUK, Buffet, 2 × TF. Nine trailer car units followed this formation, with the addition of a TS. 'Pullman' services replace a TS with an additional first-class coach.

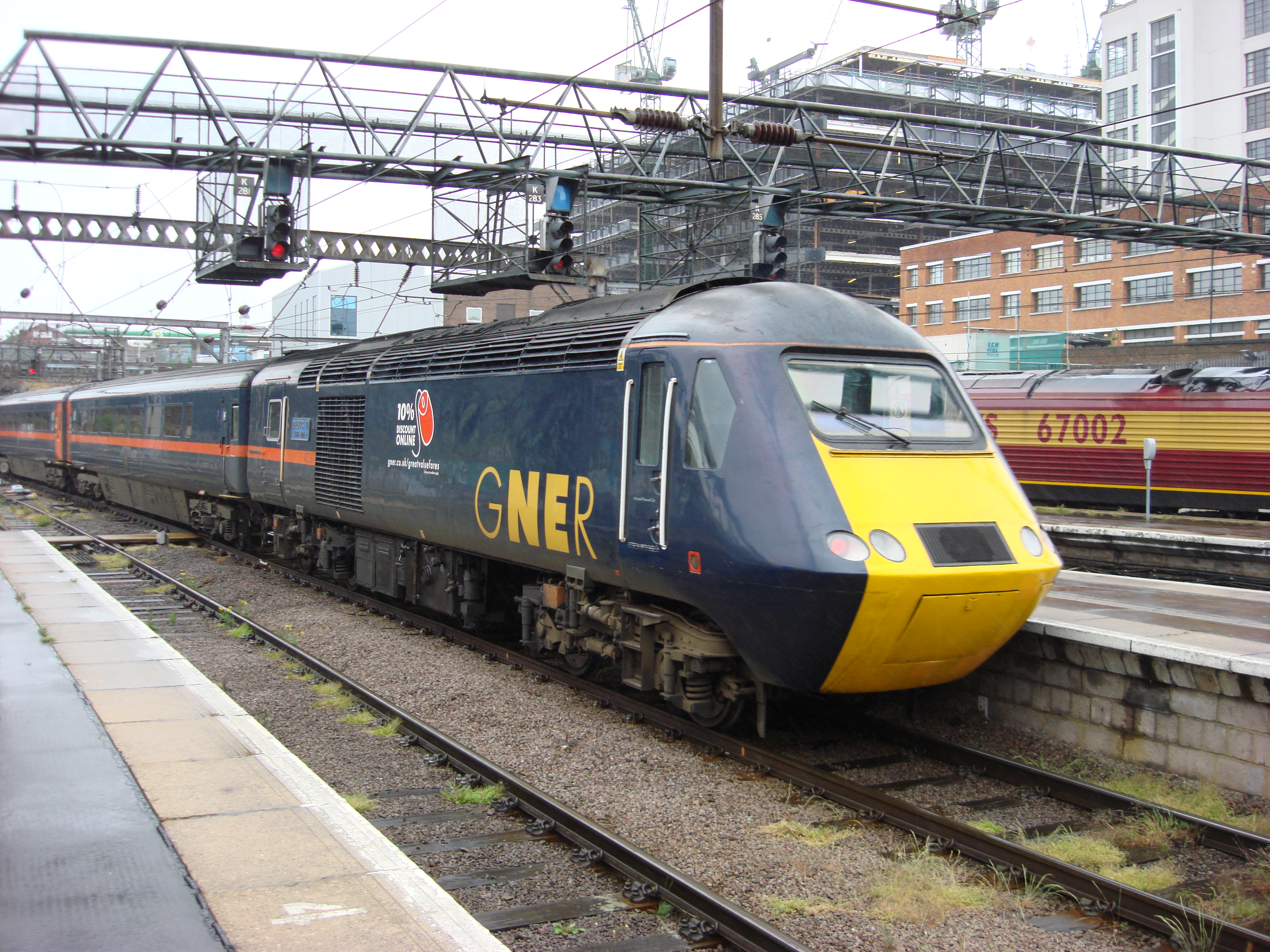
GNER liveried InterCity 125 departing King's Cross in 2007

After privatisation, InterCity 125s were operated by Great North Eastern Railway (GNER), alongside electric InterCity 225 units from London to Newcastle and Edinburgh, and beyond the electrified sections (or where British Rail Class 91s cannot operate due to route availability restrictions) to Hull, Skipton, Harrogate, Inverness and Aberdeen.

In January 2007 the first of GNER's 13 refurbished HSTs was unveiled with coaches rebuilt to the same 'Mallard' standard as its InterCity 225 electric sets with similar seating, lighting, carpets and buffet cars. The power cars were upgraded with MTU engines. The first of the HST Mallards was in service by spring 2007.

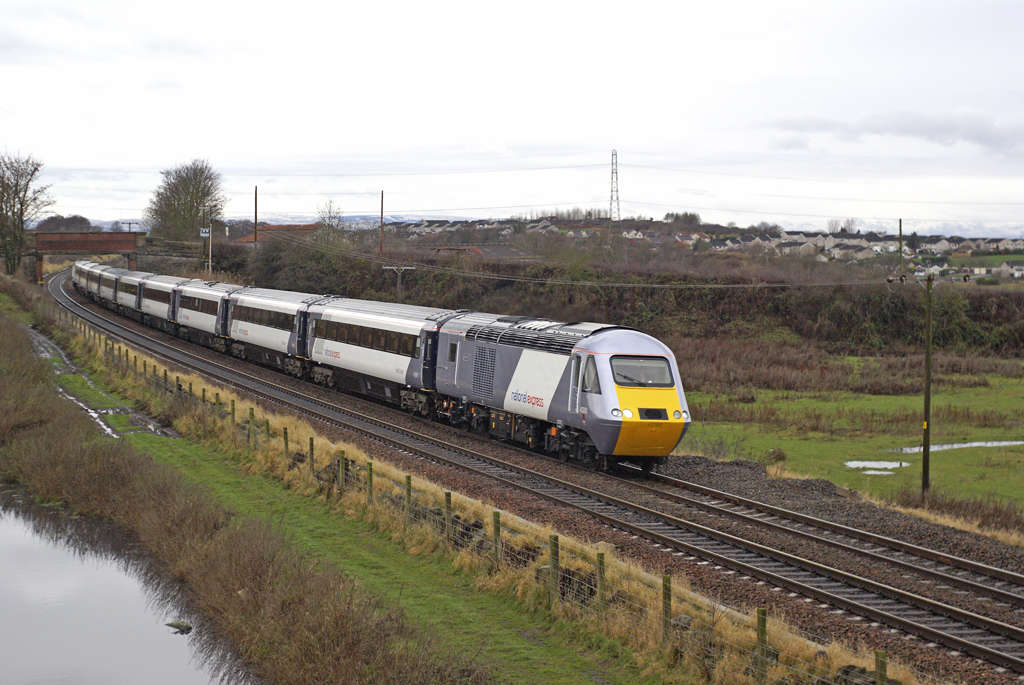
National Express East Coast liveried InterCity 125 in 2007

In 2007 the franchise was taken over by National Express East Coast (NXEC), which continued the re-engining programme begun by GNER, and completed the refurbishment of the fleet in March 2009. Two power cars were transferred to First Great Western early in 2009. The final Mallard-upgraded Mark 3 coaches entered service with NXEC in October 2009.

Following an announcement by National Express that it would not provide further financial support to NXEC, the franchise ceased on 13 November 2009, and the operation of the route returned to public ownership. As a result, the 13 sets were operated by East Coast from late 2009. East Coast introduced an InterCity 125 service to Lincoln in 2011. The InterCity 125 was replaced by the electric InterCity 225 on the line to Skipton when the electrical infrastructure was upgraded. Eight East Coast services per day in each direction used the InterCity 125. In 2012, 43072 (now 43272), 43074 (now 43274) were transferred from East Midlands Trains and received MTU engines. In April 2015, Virgin Trains East Coast took over operation of the InterCity East Coast franchise. All trains passed with the InterCity East Coast franchise to London North Eastern Railway in June 2018.

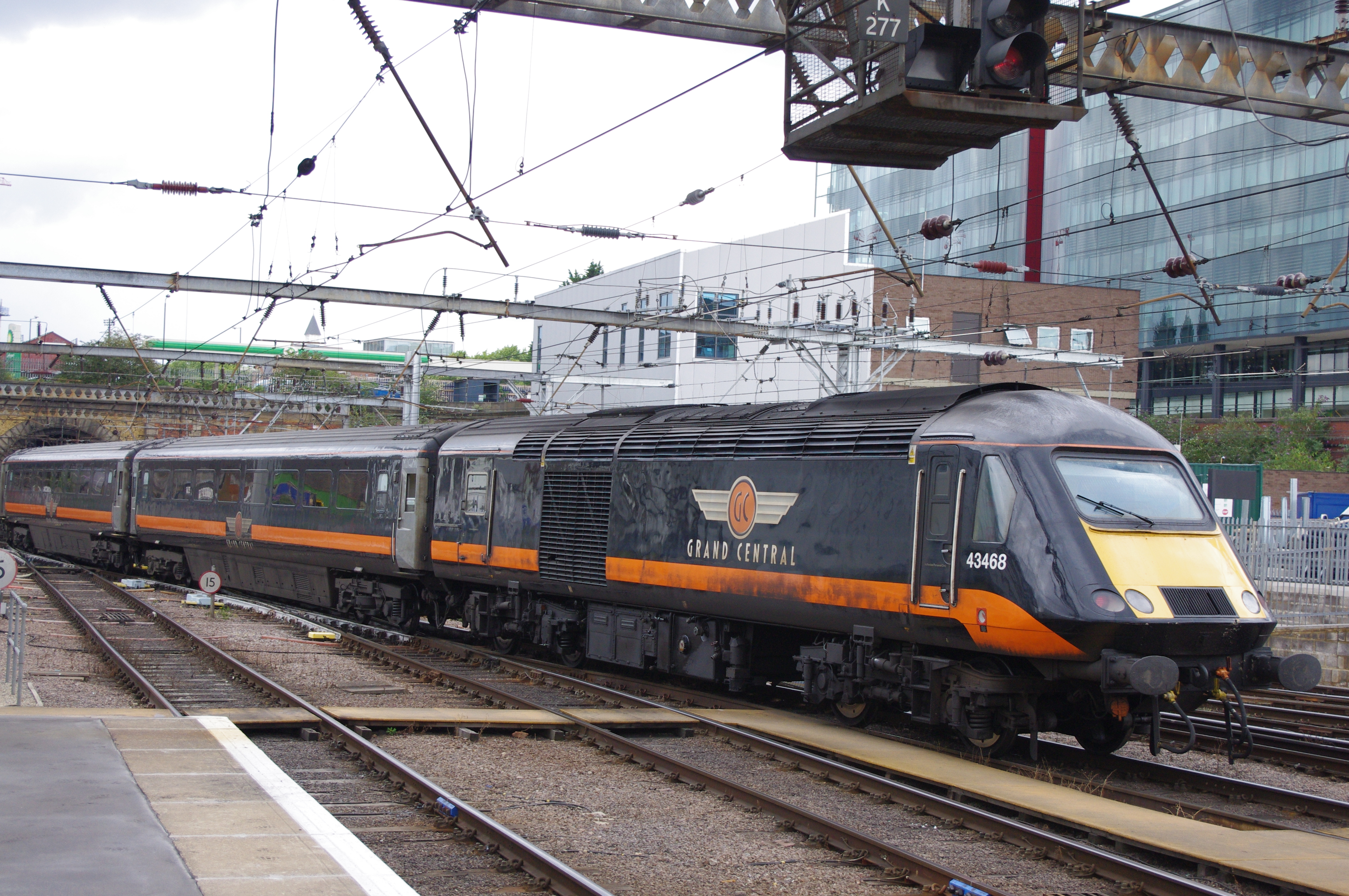
Grand Central InterCity 125 departing London King's Cross in 2011. All Grand Central Class 43 power cars had exposed front buffers due to previous use as surrogate Driving Van Trailers (DVTs).

In 2006, Grand Central obtained six Class 43 power cars to operate its London-Sunderland passenger service via the East Coast Main Line. The service was due to begin in December 2006 although upgrade work to enable the coaching stock (which was formerly used for locomotive-hauled services and had a different electric heating/power supply system) to operate with Class 43 power cars was heavily delayed and therefore pushed the starting date back to 18 December 2007. HSTs 43084 and 43123 were the final operational Paxman Valenta power cars, being re-engined in 2010 with the same MTU engines as other units. While at the works being re-engined, Grand Central added the orange stripe that appears on their Class 180 units, re-painted the front ends (this making them look more like the non-buffered HSTs), and re-numbered the power cars into the four-hundreds. Grand Central's HSTs were cascaded to East Midlands Trains at the end of 2017.

In February 2019 Hull Trains commenced using a First Great Western set between London King's Cross and Hull due to ongoing reliability issues with its Class 180s. A month later they introduced an additional set following further reliability issues. LNER withdrew its last InterCity 125s in December 2019.

=== Midland Region ===
On the London Midland Region, InterCity 125 trains were introduced later than on the other regions. They initially appeared on the former Midland Railway route from London St Pancras to Sheffield and Nottingham. Although they were initially not permitted to exceed 100 mph (161 km/h) on any part of the route, they still delivered time savings compared with the loco-hauled trains they replaced.

The Midland Main Line received a series of speed improvements over the next two decades, until it became possible for HSTs to run at up to 110 mph (177 km/h) on some sections. An upgrade to the full 125 mph (201 km/h) was proposed by British Rail in the early 1990s, but because of privatisation this did not happen. However line improvements were completed in time for the spring 2014 timetable change, which has permitted 125 mph running on some sections of the line and higher top speeds on others.

Most long-distance services on this route have been transferred to new Class 222 Meridian diesel-electric multiple units, although many London services from Nottingham still used the InterCity 125, as did all services from London St Pancras to Leeds. Midland Mainline inherited HSTs from BR after privatisation and operated them on its primary services at up to 110 mph.

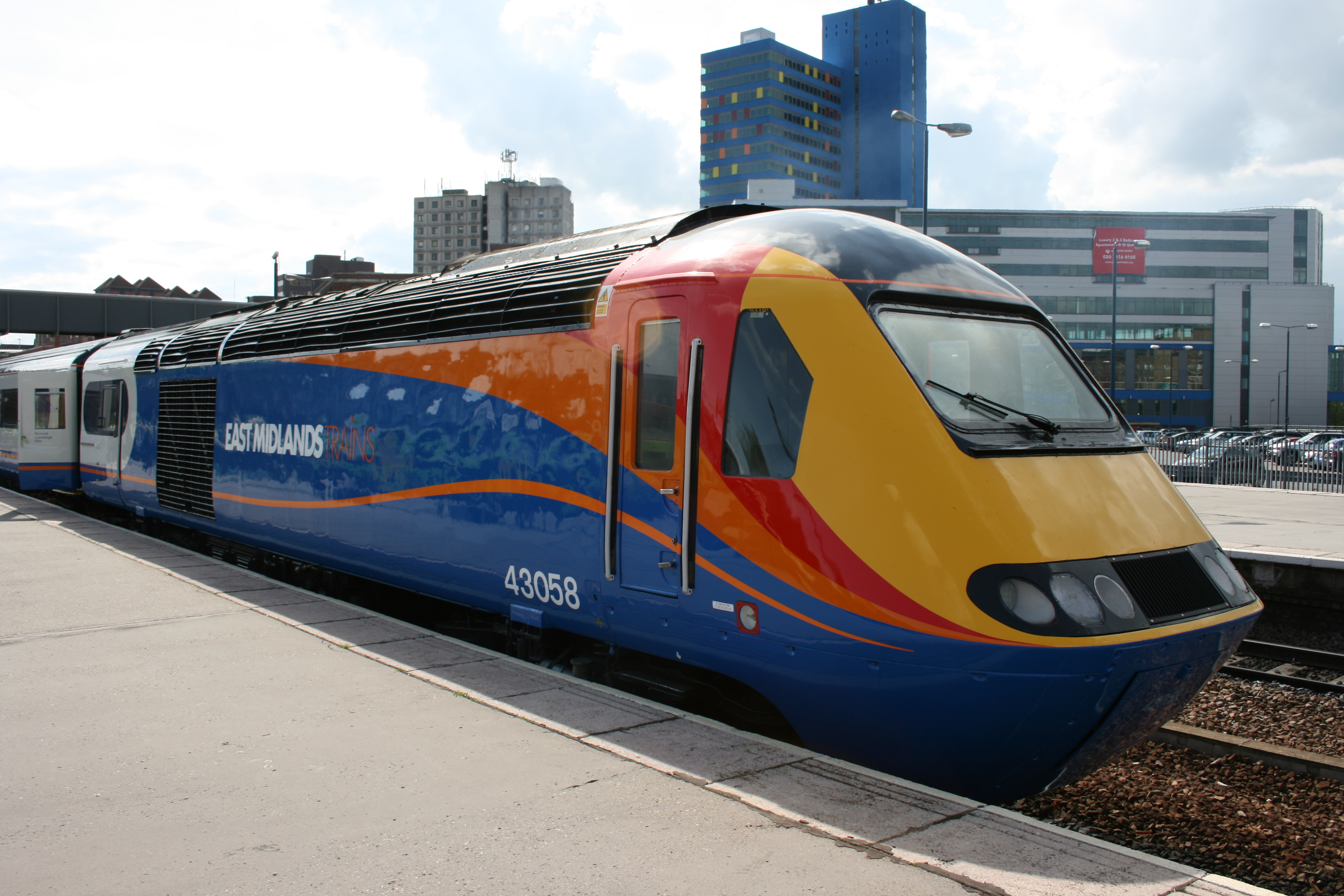
East Midlands Trains liveried HST at Leicester in 2008

43089 also was returned to work on the mainline after being used in an experimental programme conducted by Network Rail and Hitachi. 43072, 43074 was transferred to East Coast in 2012. Since December 2013, InterCity 125 sets have been permitted to operate at speeds of up to 125 mph on certain parts of the routes from London St Pancras to Leeds and Nottingham.

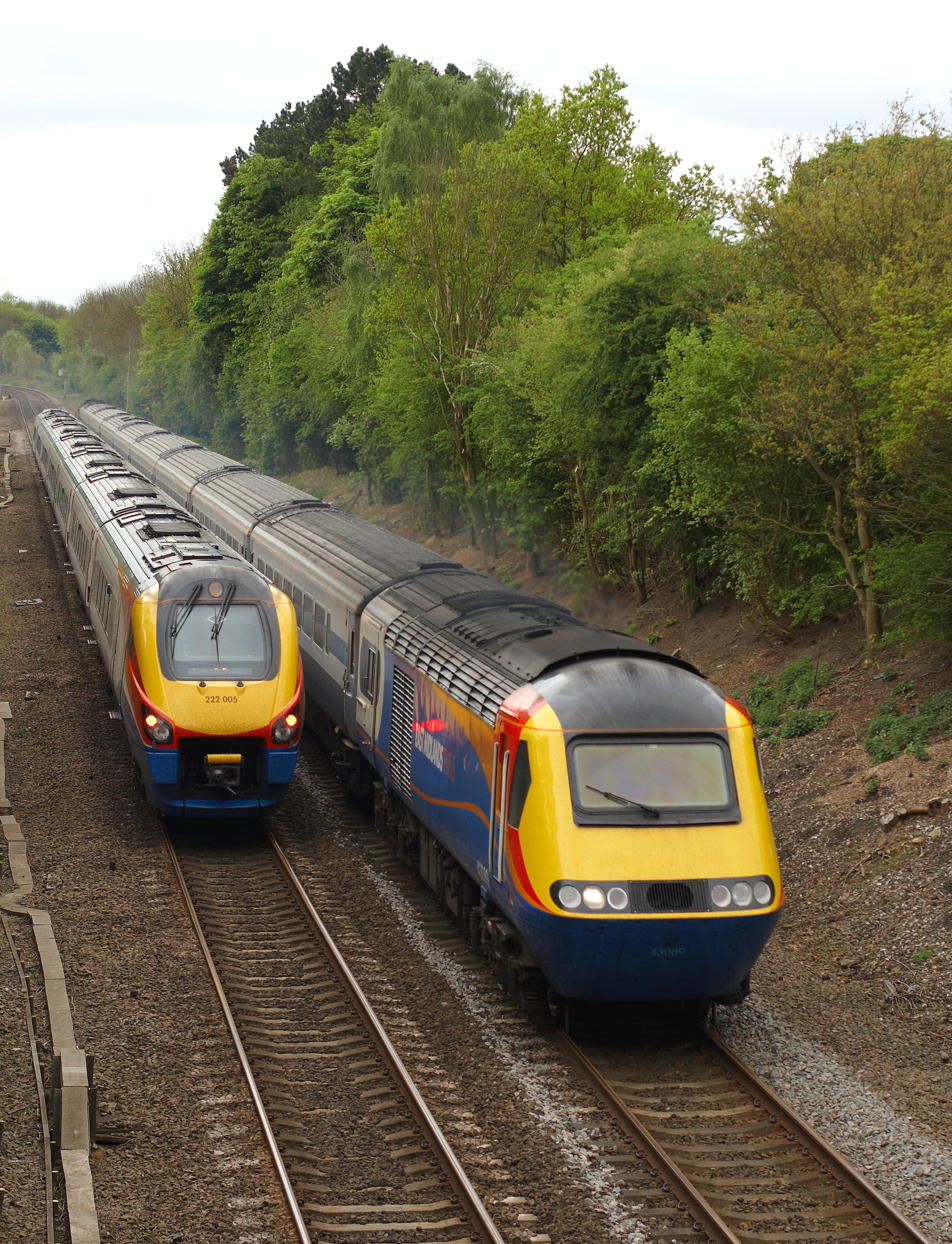
East Midlands Trains InterCity 125 passing a Class 222 in 2009

On 15 May 2021, EMR retired their final two InterCity 125 trains, which were replaced by East Midlands Railway with Class 222, and had been displaced thanks to the introduction of Class 180 and Class 360 from Hull Trains and Greater Anglia. This made them the last HST operator to run InterCity 125 services to the capital.

=== Cross-Country Route ===
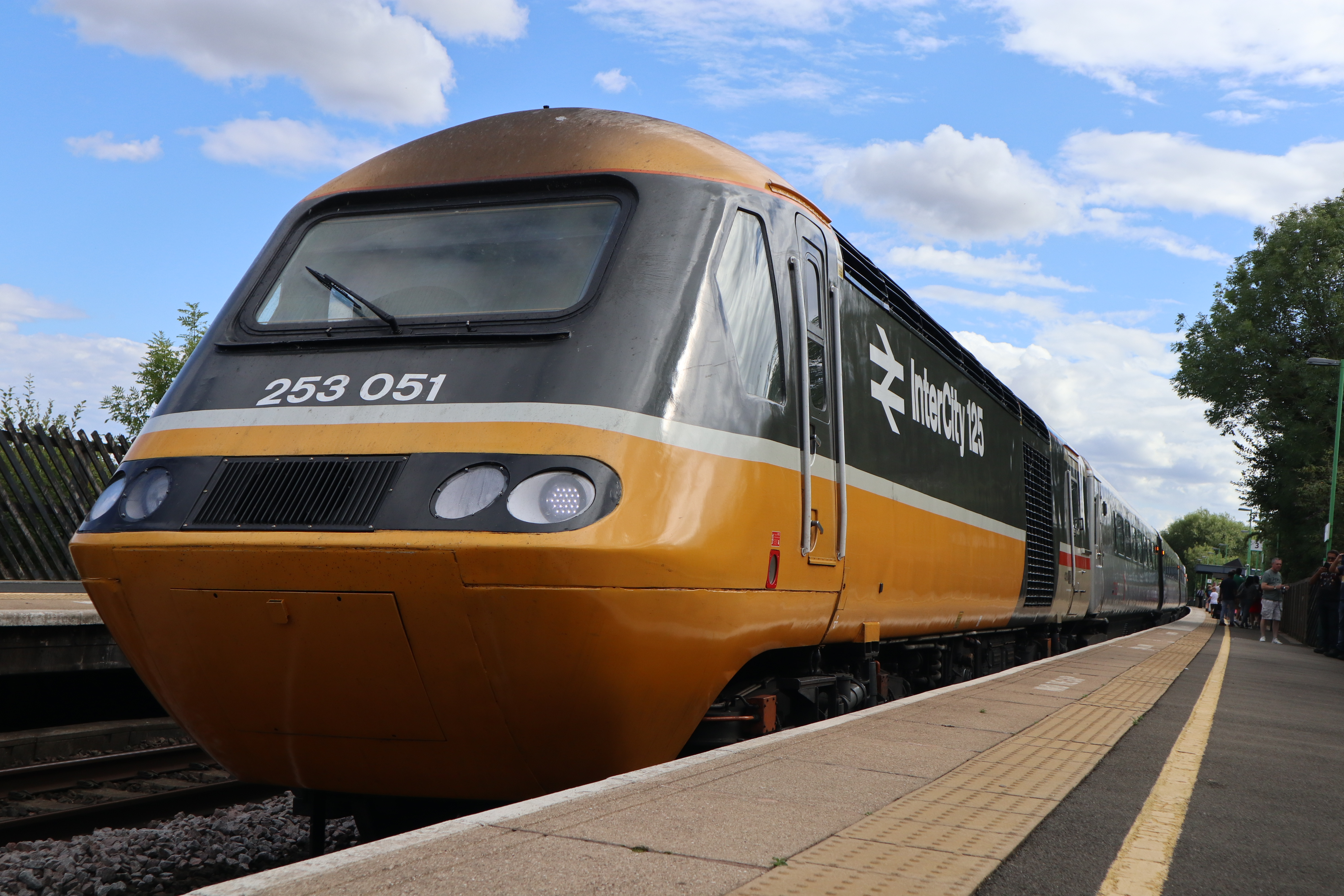
CrossCountry (Inter City 125 branded) service departing Tamworth in 2022

After privatisation, the Cross Country Route was operated by Virgin CrossCountry, who replaced their InterCity 125 trains in the period 2002–2004 with Bombardier Voyager high-speed DMUs. Most of the former Virgin CrossCountry fleet were stored for several years but a few ran on the Midland Main Line for the train company Midland Mainline.

In 2007, the franchise passed to Arriva CrossCountry. In response to overcrowding, the company reintroduced five HST sets to supplement its Voyagers.

In September 2008, CrossCountry refurbished its first HST set – the coaches were refurbished to a similar "Mallard" standard as GNER trains, though their interior is in burgundy and there are fewer tables. They also differ from the East Coast sets in having electronic seat reservations, and the buffet car has been removed, with all catering provided at-seat from a catering base in coach B. Most of the coaches are rebuilt from loco-hauled Mark 3 stock. The refurbishment was carried out by Wabtec, Doncaster Works. Each set has had a TS removed, making them two power cars + seven coaches. All coaches retained were fitted with automatic doors, toilets with controlled emission tanks and other accessibility modifications at Doncaster Works.

CrossCountry operated its last InterCity 125 service in September 2023.

=== West Coast and North Wales ===
Virgin Trains West Coast HSTs regularly worked out of London Euston and Birmingham International to Holyhead and Blackpool North. They also worked some Euston to Manchester Piccadilly services. Virgin's HSTs were re-deployed in May 2004. Due to there being numerous curves on the West Coast Main Line, the trains were not permitted to exceed 110 mph on any part of the route.

When the West Coast Main Line was upgraded by Network Rail in the 2000s, it became necessary to operate diversionary routes whilst work was going on. As a result, Midland Mainline was asked by the then Strategic Rail Authority (SRA) to operate services from Manchester via the Hope Valley Line and Midland Main Line into St Pancras while West Coast Main Line works took place. In a temporary operation dubbed Project Rio, a large percentage of the stored Virgin CrossCountry power cars were overhauled and returned to service in an enlarged Midland Mainline fleet. Ending on 10 September 2004, the Project Rio fleet was gradually disbanded, with power cars moving to First Great Western and GNER.

=== ScotRail Inter7City ===
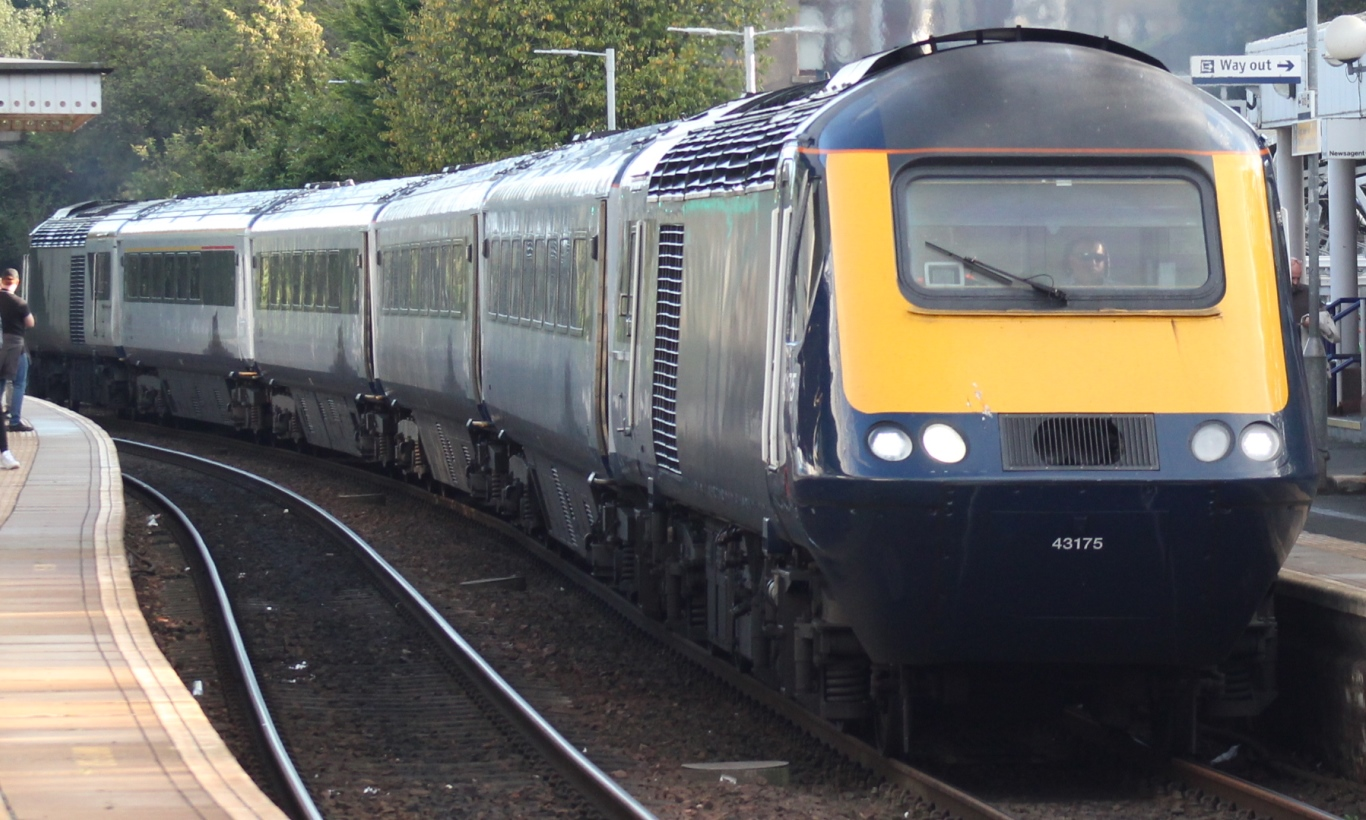
ScotRail HST Inter7city set in 2019

Twenty-six HST sets, nine with four coaches and 17 with five coaches, moved from Great Western Railway to Abellio ScotRail after being refurbished by Wabtec at Doncaster Works with new interiors, controlled emission tanks and automatic sliding doors. They operate on services from Edinburgh and Glasgow to Aberdeen and Inverness, as well as between Aberdeen and Inverness. The first set entered service in October 2018. ScotRail's HST fleet operates under the brand name Inter7City.

In September 2024, the Scottish Government announced their intention to replace ScotRail's HST fleet. In March 2026, it was announced that the HSTs would be replaced with refurbished Class 222 Meridian units, with these units being expected to be introduced between 2027 and 2028.

=== Network Rail ===
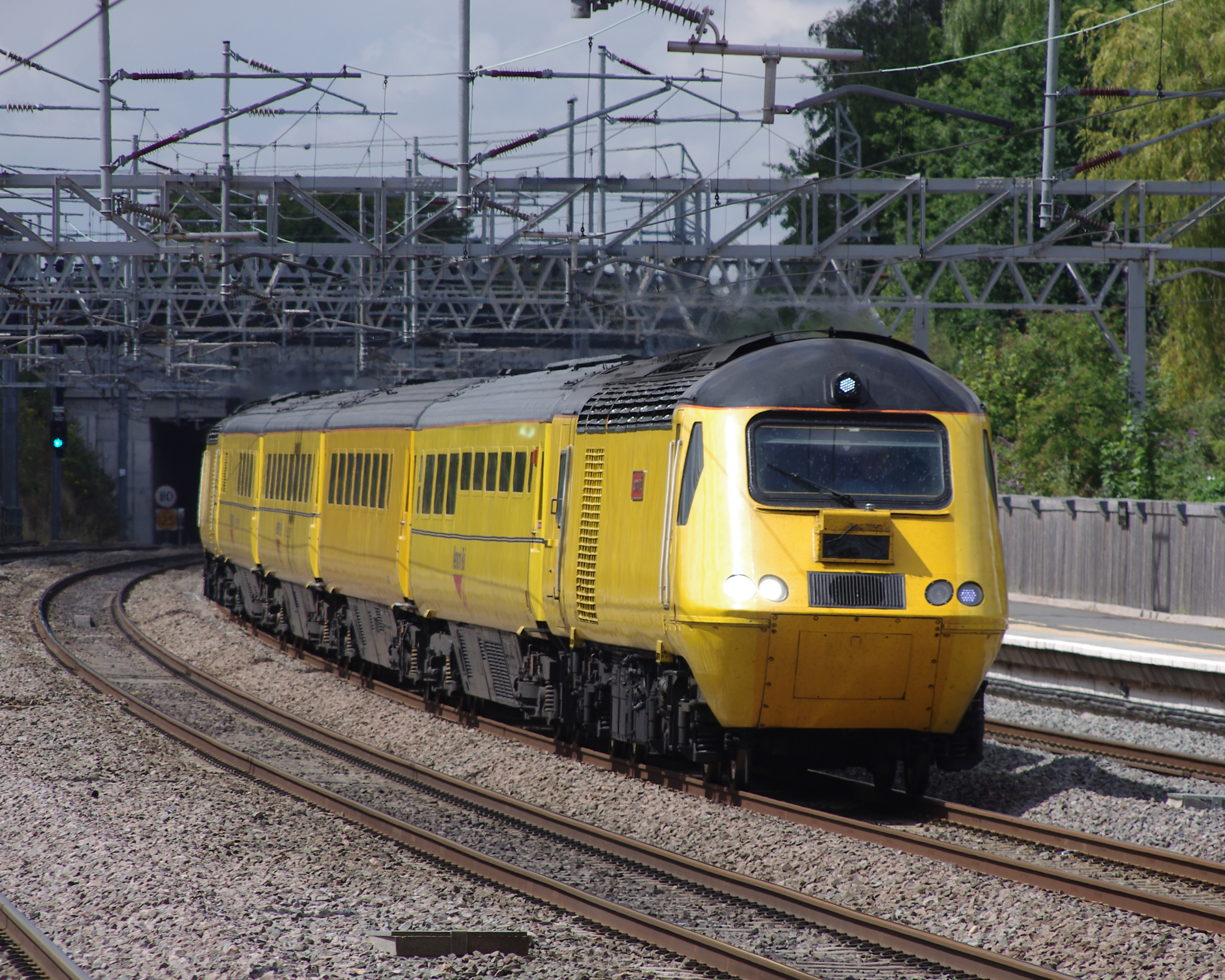
The New Measurement Train on the West Coast Main Line in 2011

One specially converted HST set is in service with Network Rail, assessing the condition of track so that engineers can determine where to work. The train is painted in the yellow livery used for maintenance vehicles, and often referred to as the "flying banana" (a nickname that was originally applied to the whole class because when first introduced by BR they wore a predominantly yellow livery). The set is the New Measurement Train.

Another single engine, 43089, was used in tests on hybrid battery powered vehicles in collaboration with Hitachi.

== Numbering and formation ==
British Rail considered the InterCity 125 sets to be diesel multiple units because they were fixed formation trains. They were allocated British Rail Class 253 (2+7 sets allocated to Western Region depots for use on Western Region and Cross-Country services) and Class 254 (2+8 sets allocated to the Eastern and Scottish Regions for use on the East Coast Main Line), the prototype train having been Class 252. Therefore, each set was allocated a set number (253 xxx or 254 xxx), which was carried on the front of the power cars. Individual vehicles were numbered in the 4xxxx series (see table below) and, because they were regarded as multiple unit vehicles, also had regional prefixes according to their allocated depot (E for Eastern Region, SC for Scottish and W for Western); this included the power cars as well as the trailers.

With power cars often requiring maintenance more frequently than the trailer cars, power car swaps soon began to take place; there were a few spare power cars to allow for this. This often resulted in different set numbers being displayed at each end of the same train. As a result, during the early 1980s the power cars began to be regarded as "loose", and the use of set numbers for the whole train was abandoned. The trailer cars remained in fixed formations, however, and still allocated a set number of sorts, although that was not displayed anywhere.

As sectorisation began to take hold during the mid-1980s, the use of regional prefixes on coaches and multiple unit vehicles was discontinued. At about the same time it was decided to reclassify the InterCity 125 trains (the hyphen having been dropped by the new InterCity sector) as locos and coaches. To avoid renumbering the power cars, they became British Rail Class 43 diesel locos, although a space was never inserted between the second and third digits (as was common practice on other locos at the time, e.g. 47 401).

The vehicle types used to form High Speed Trains are listed below:

Class	Image	Type	Top speed		Number	Built	Notes
Class	Image	Type	mph	km/h	Number	Built	Notes
Class 43		Diesel locomotive	125	201	197	1975–1982	2 InterCity 125 power cars, operated in Top and Tail formation.
Mark 3 Coach		Passenger coaching stock	125	201	848	1975–1988	British Rail's third fundamental design of passenger coach, developed primarily for the InterCity 125.

Coach number
Number Range	Type	Notes
400xx	Trailer Buffet (TRSB)	Renumbered 404xx in 1983; some converted to 402xx series
403xx	Trailer Buffet (TRUB)	All converted to 407xx series (first class)
405xx	Trailer Kitchen (TRUK)	All withdrawn and converted for other uses
41xxx	Trailer First (TF)	Majority in service, some converted or scrapped
42xxx	Trailer Second (TS)	Majority in service, some converted or scrapped
43002-43198	Driving Motor (Brake) (DM or DMB)	Majority in service, three scrapped after accidents These are now classified as British Rail Class 43
44000-44101	Trailer Guard Second (TGS)	Majority in service, some converted

The 197 production series power cars were numbered 43002–43198. 43001 was applied to the second of the two prototype power cars, while the first of the pair (now preserved as part of the National Collection) became 43000 – unusual because BR TOPS classification numbered its locomotives from 001 upwards (this was because it was not, at the time, classified as a locomotive). Subsequently, on fitting of new engines, power cars operated by the InterCity East Coast and Cross Country franchisees have been renumbered in the 432xx or 433xx series (by adding 200 to their serial numbers), while Grand Central also changed the third digit of its power cars to 4 (by adding 300 or 400).

The renumbering of the 400xx series catering vehicles in 1983 was to avoid their numbers clashing with the Class 40 diesel loco fleet (numbered 40 001 to 40 199) when BR's loco (TOPS) and coaching stock number series were merged.

In 2002, Class 255 was allocated for the reformation of some HST power cars and trailers into semi-fixed formation trains, to be known as Virgin Challenger units, for use by Virgin CrossCountry. These formations would have had power cars sandwiching one Trailer First, a Trailer Buffet, two Trailer Seconds and a Trailer Guard Second. These plans came to naught as the Strategic Rail Authority planned to transfer most of the stock to Midland Mainline for its 'Rio' services between London and Manchester.

=== Livery ===
InterCity logo 1978–1985

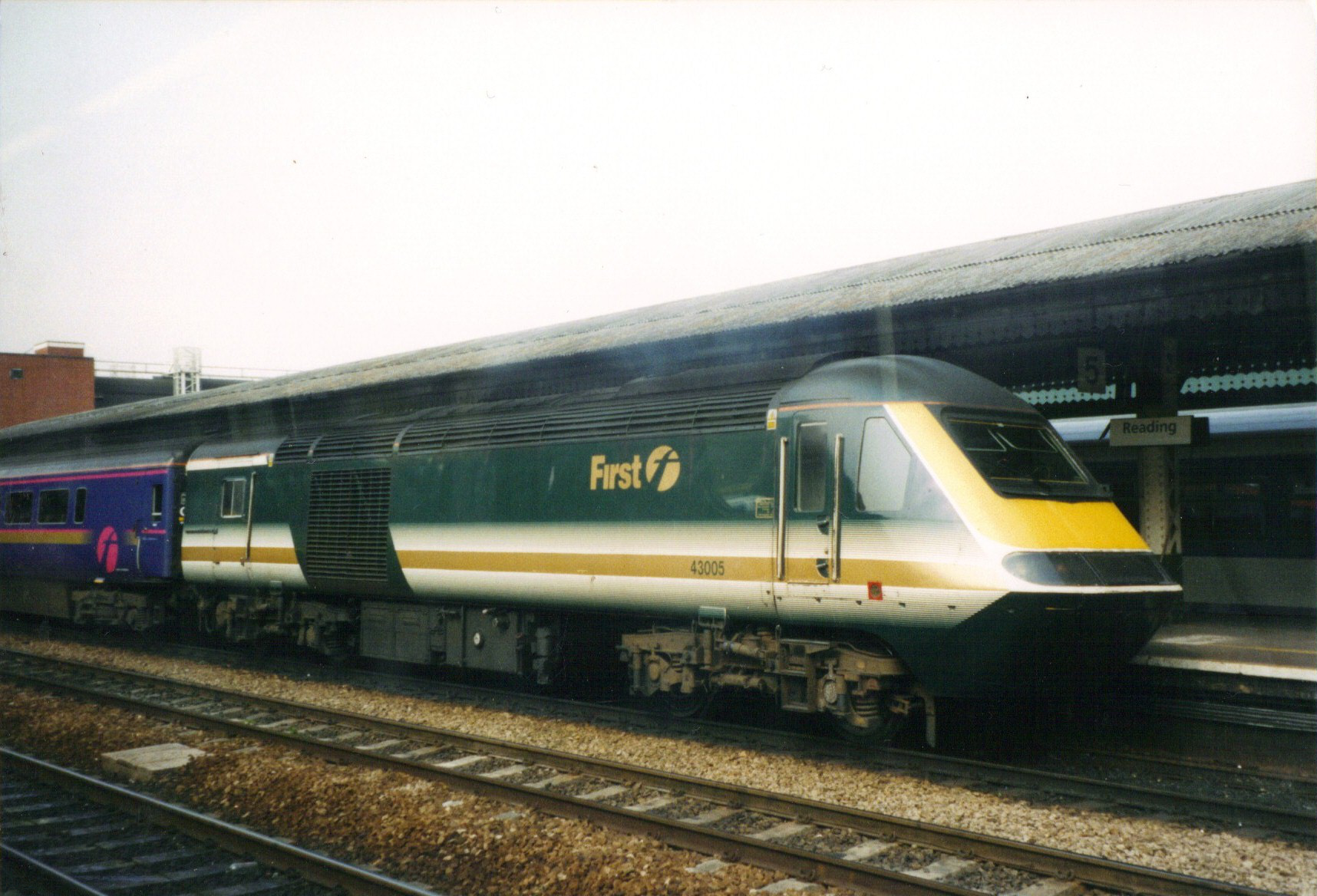
First Great Western HST at Reading railway station in 2004, wearing two liveries: "Fag Packet" on the power car and "Barbie" on the coaches

The original "Inter-City 125" livery was blue and grey, with a yellow front to improve visibility which continued down the side of the power cars.

The second livery had mostly grey power-cars with a white band along the middle, yellow underneath the white band, with the InterCity colours (cream, red, white, brown) for the parcel compartment of the power cars and the coaches.

There was brownish-grey, dark grey (almost black) around the windows with a red and white stripe below the windows, and retaining the yellow bands on the power cars. The final variant of this livery saw the yellow side-bands replaced with white and did not feature the British Rail name or logo: it carried the new sector branding Intercity logo in serif type and an image of a flying swallow. This is commonly referred to as "InterCity Swallow" livery, and was applied to other locomotives in the sector.

After the privatisation of British Rail, train operating companies painted the HSTs in their own colour schemes, with some lasting longer than others.

Two of Great Western Railway's powercars have been repainted into heritage liveries; 43002 has repainted into original InterCity 125 Blue & Yellow livery whereas 43185 has been repainted into InterCity Swallow livery.

Two powercars [43046 and 43055] owned by Locomotive Services Limited have been repainted into Blue Pullman colours. The units will be used for railtour services operated by LSL beginning on 14 November 2020.

== Cultural impact ==
=== Public reaction ===
The Intercity service proved an instant hit with the British public. By the early 1980s the HST had caught the travelling public's imagination, thanks in part to a television advertising campaign fronted by entertainment personality Jimmy Savile, together with the advertising strap-line "This is the age of the train". British Rail enjoyed a boom in patronage on the routes operated by the HSTs and InterCity's revenues increased, although the total was not enough to remove the need for subsidies to British Rail.

=== International interest ===
The success of the HST had significant international impact. Foreign press for decades observed and praised the speed and quality of the service.

The InterCity 125 was used as a case study for evaluating the potential for a high-speed rail system in California. In Australia, it was used as the base for developing the XPT, in cooperation with British Rail.

=== Models ===
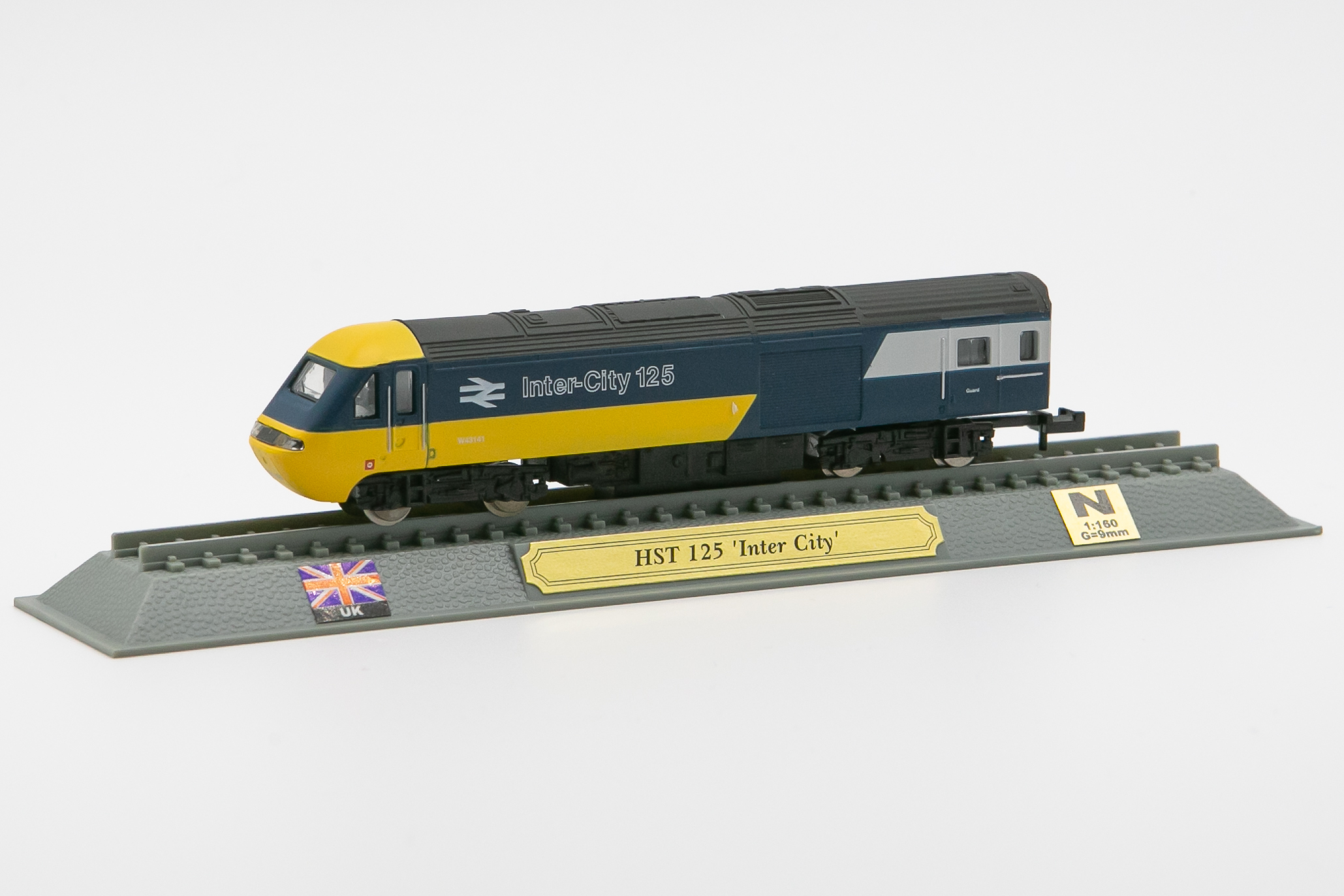
Class 253 Del Prado N Gauge scale BR Class 43 (HST) HST power car model

There have been many model and toy guises of the IC125. One of the first in the UK was by Hornby Railways, which launched its first model version as a train set in 1977. This model was supplied with an incorrect length BR Mk3 Open 2nd coach which was shortened to allow the model to reliably negotiate the smallest radius curves. This was done by removing one of the 8 side windows rather than scaling the whole length. In 2025, as part of the Railway 200 celebrations, Hornby reproduced a retro replica of their first ever Hornby Railways, B.R Inter-City 125 High Speed Train set from 1977. In 1978 Hornby Railways issued an additional BR Mk 3 Open 2nd coach, followed by their first model of a BR Mk 3 Open 1st Coach in 1979 and a BR Mk 3 Restaurant Buffet Car (TRUB) in 1980. The incorrect seven side windows was corrected to eight windows in 1985 when Hornby made modifications to the tooling for the BR Mk 3 (TS) and (TF) coaches. It was later released in InterCity 'Swallow' livery, Great Western green-and-white, Midland Mainline and Virgin Trains. Lima released its version of the IC125 in 1982, of which the Mark 3 coaches were correct to the lengths of the real-life coaches and included the guard's coach. Hornby eventually followed suit in the late-1990s, when its short Mark 3 coaches were replaced by correct scale length ones but omitted the guard's coach. In 2006 Hornby released for the first time a modified tooling BR Mk 3 (TGS) Coach. In 2008 after acquiring tooling from ex-Lima rolling stock which then became the Hornby RailRoad range. Hornby released in a variety of different liveries both BR and post-privatisation a newly tooled super-detailed Class 43 powers car, alongside the more basic Class 43 HST power cars of the Railroad Range. In 2009 Hornby released newly tooled BR Mk 3 coaches. Graham Farish were the first to produce an HST in N gauge; more recently Dapol have produced another N gauge model of the train. Railway Shop (Hong Kong) produces a T gauge model (1:450 scale).

== Developments and changes ==
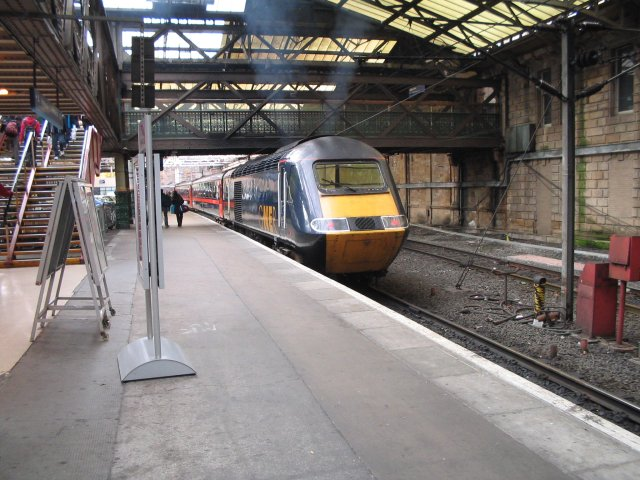
An InterCity 125 with a Paxman Valenta engine, which produced a lot more noise and exhaust gases than its replacements

=== Damaged vehicles and accidents ===
Five Class 43 locomotives have been written off in railway accidents, three of which occurred on the Great Western Main Line. 43011 was written off in the 1999 Ladbroke Grove rail crash, 43019 was written off after colliding with a car at Ufton Nervet in 2004 and 43173 was scrapped after heavy damage in the Southall rail crash of 1997. In each of these cases, the damage was to the leading power car; the trailing power cars suffered limited or no damage and were returned to service. At Ladbroke Grove and Ufton Nervet, the accidents were ultimately caused by factors not involving the HST sets or their drivers, although the set involved in the Ladbroke Grove crash had a faulty AWS system; however, the Southall accident was due to the HST colliding with a goods train which was entering Southall Goods Yard, crossing the main lines. The immediate cause of the crash was the result of the driver of the HST passing a red signal without stopping. In addition, the leading power car of the set had a faulty Automatic Warning System which if operational would have alerted the driver to his error and possibly prevented the accident. Following investigation, this system has since been required to be kept operational and switched on for all use of the InterCity 125 fleet.

An InterCity HST, comprising four coaches between Class 43 power cars 43030 and 43140, was involved in the Stonehaven derailment on 12 August 2020, in which three people died. Both power cars were scrapped following the subsequent investigation.

=== Re-engining and refurbishment ===
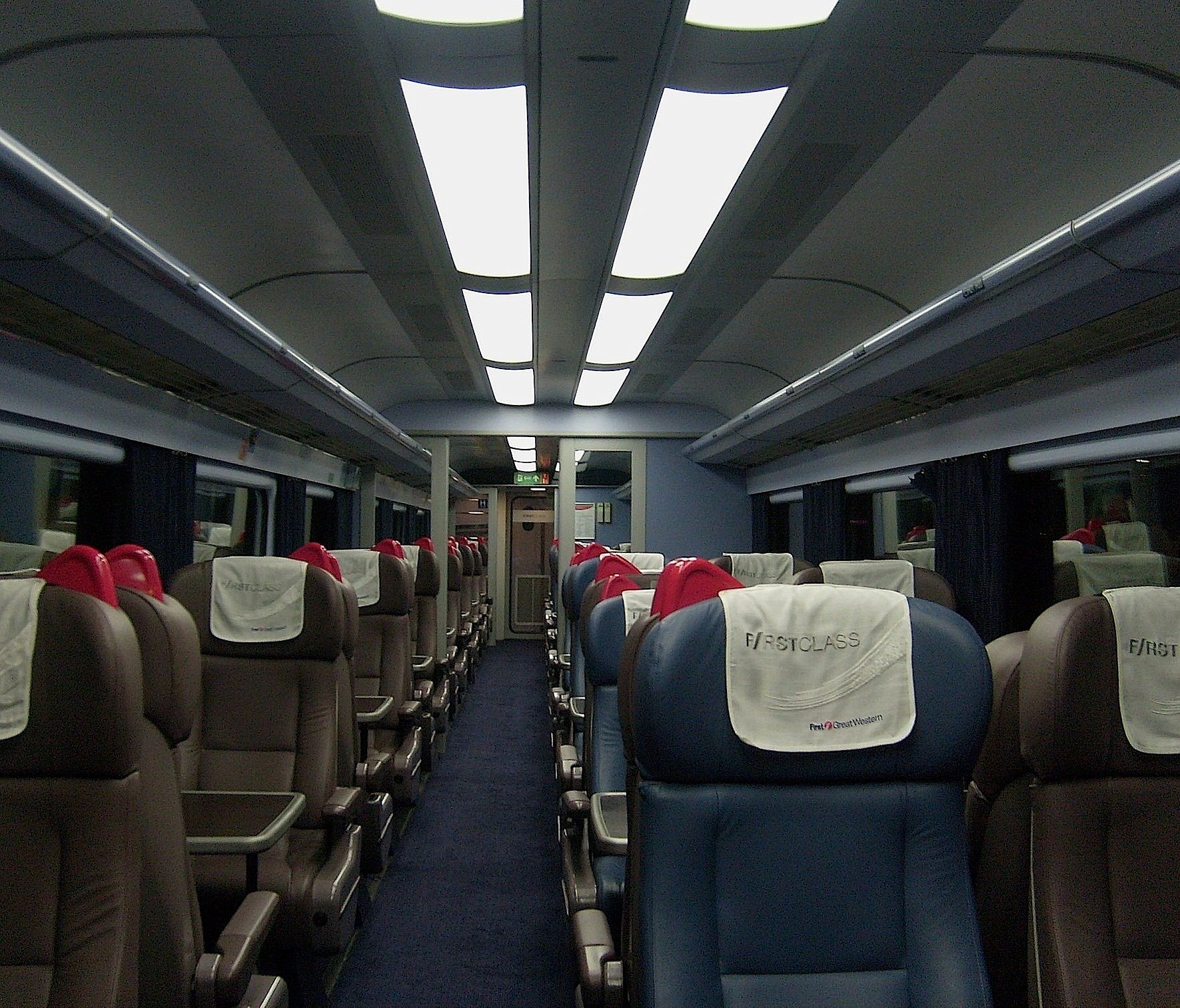
Refurbished Mark 3 coach First Class interior (First Great Western)

In 2005, the train leasing company Angel Trains initiated and led an industry-wide programme to replace the 30-year-old Paxman Valenta engines in the HST power cars with new MTU 16V 4000 engines. The upgrade, which was part of a £110 million total investment made by Angel Trains on its fleet of High Speed Trains, included the re-powering and refurbishment of 54 HST power cars; this included those then on lease to GNER (23), First Great Western (26) and CrossCountry (5). Virgin CrossCountry planned a similar project in the early 2000s but, with the collapse of the programme, the upgraded trainsets were sold along with their unmodified stablemates.

Additionally, many operators undertook some refurbishment of the Mark 3 coaches in the early 2000s. In view of the delay and change of direction of the HST2 programme, operators began to refurbish their HST fleets in 2006; both by remotoring with the more modern MTU4000 diesel engine, and by refurbishing the coach interiors. It was anticipated that these overhauls would give the HST at least another 10 years in front-line service.

=== Replacements ===
The first partial replacement of HSTs occurred from 1988 on the East Coast Main Line, with the introduction of the InterCity 225 when the line to Edinburgh was electrified. Some were retained for services to Aberdeen, Inverness, Skipton, Bradford and Hull.

As the InterCity 125 fleet aged, it became increasingly recognised that the train was nearing the end of its service life. More recently, HSTs have been replaced (or augmented) by high-speed Diesel multiple units (DMUs), such as the Bombardier Voyagers and the UK express version of the Alstom Coradia. These DMUs have better acceleration than the HST, due to a higher power/weight ratio, with greater efficiency and braking performance.

In 2005, the initial concept of HST2 was rejected by the government and the rail industry as a like-for-like replacement for the HST fleet. In the light of this rejection, in 2006, existing operators turned to refurbishments of the InterCity 125 trains. Nevertheless, the HST2 concept was expanded and replaced by the InterCity Express Programme, with proposals for a joint replacement of both HST and InterCity 225 trains. The eventual successor to the two InterCity fleets is the Hitachi Super Express, comprising three classified types of fixed-rake formations: two electro-diesel types, the Class 800 sets and the Class 802 sets, and the electric multiple unit Class 801 sets.

On the Greater Western franchise, the first HST was returned to its leasing company in September 2017; by June 2019, all sets on inter-city routes were withdrawn in favour of the Class 800 and the Class 802 sets.

=== Sewage discharge ===
In the UK, train operators are allowed legally to discharge up to 25 L (5.5 imp gal; 6.6 US gal) of untreated waste at a time on to the track. Most Mk3 coaches have no toilet tanks, discharging directly onto the track. In the 2000s, both the RMT trade union and politicians were concerned at the environmental impact of this legacy issue. The problem was first raised in 2003, after Railtrack staff at Nottingham abandoned local clean-up and then track maintenance procedures due to an excessive buildup of sewage waste in the area. In 2006 the RMT agreed waste-tank and clean-out developments at Northern Rail's Heaton depot in 2006 with GNER, plus new clean-out procedures at all other depots, to solve an ongoing dispute over the previous 18 months.

By 2011, the European Union had started a formal investigation to see whether trains composed of such coaches were breaking EU environmental and health laws, although the Environment Agency confirmed that train companies claimed special exemptions to dump waste along the tracks. In 2013, transport minister Susan Kramer branded the practice "utterly disgusting" and called on the industry to take action. ATOC responded by stating that, as all new vehicles had to be fitted with compliant toilet tanks, with withdrawal of the HSTs by the end of 2017 the problem would be solved. HSTs remained in operation after 2017, but sliding-door conversions of CrossCountry's fleet and the shortened sets for GWR and ScotRail have all included the fitting of controlled emission toilets.

=== Obsolescence factors ===
In 2019, HSTs were not permitted to operate passenger services on the National Rail network in their original form because various deficiencies made them non-compliant with accessibility regulations – in particular, the need to open doors manually. However, to avoid rolling stock shortages, some operators were granted temporary permission to operate them, namely ScotRail, whose sets were planned to be modified, and East Midlands Trains, who have since withdrawn their sets in favour of Class 222 Meridians.

== Australian variant ==
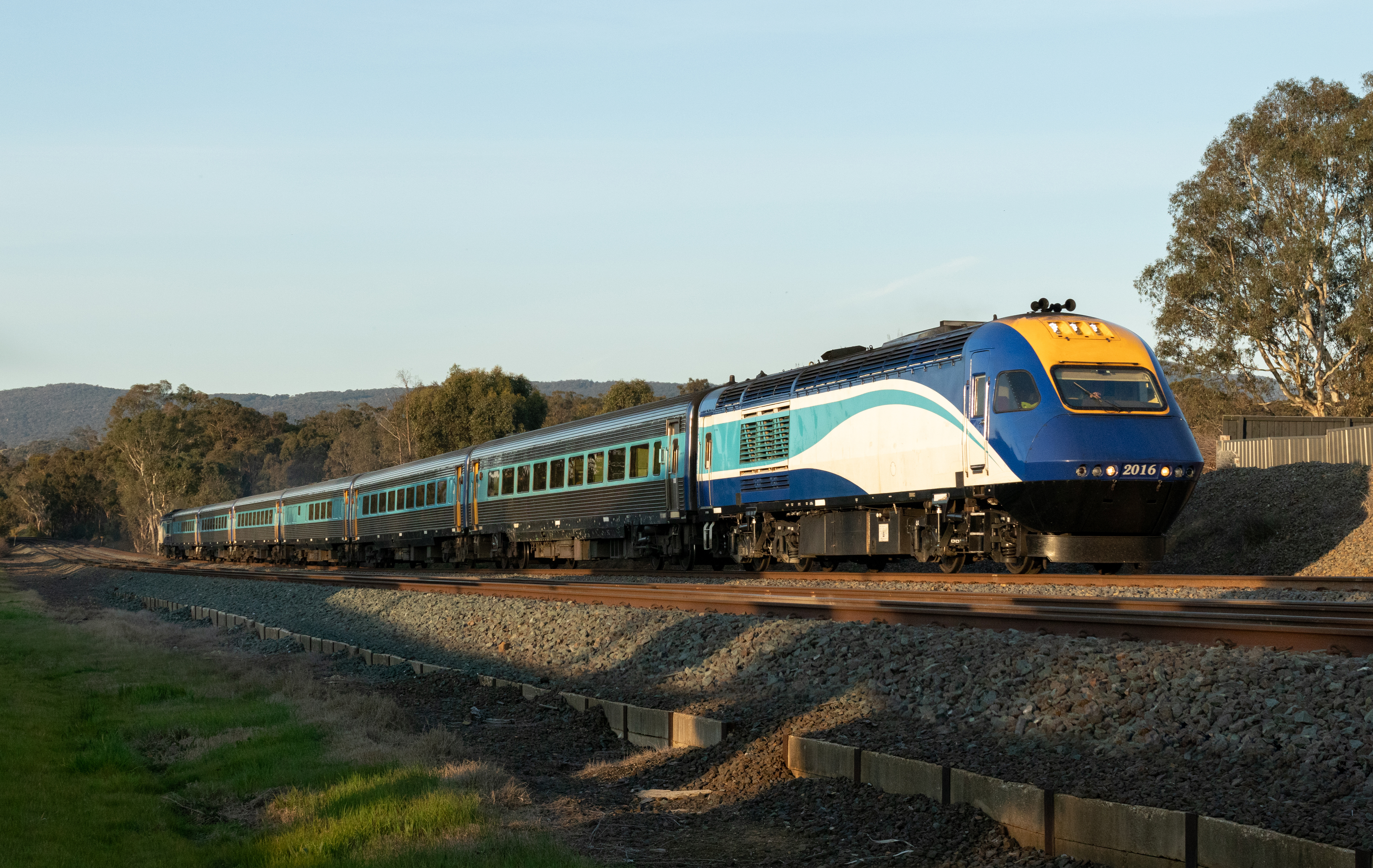
XPT in debranded CountryLink livery in 2023

The InterCity 125 was the design basis for the XPT fleet, developed under licence by Commonwealth Engineering for the State Rail Authority. A fleet of 15 power cars and 47 carriages were built by Commonwealth Engineering at its Granville factory between 1981 and 1984. A further four power cars and 13 carriages were built for successor CountryLink by ABB at its Dandenong factory in 1992/93 including eight sleepers.

The power cars were shorter, higher, wider and 2.5 tonnes lighter than those of the HST. The Paxman Valenta engine was derated to 2,000 bhp (1,491 kW) and the gear ratios changed for a normal top speed of 160 km/h (100 mph), although one did set an Australian speed record of 193 km/h (120 mph) in testing. A larger cooling group and secondary air filters were fitted to cope with higher temperatures. Sealed beam headlights were fitted above the cab. All were repowered with Paxman VP185 engines in 1999/2000.

The carriages bear little resemblance to the British Rail Mark 3s, being based on a Budd design. Only a modified version of the BT10 bogie was carried over from the Mark 3 design.

Apart from two carriages scrapped after the Wallan derailment, all remain in service as at 2026 on services from Sydney to Grafton, Casino, Brisbane, Dubbo and Melbourne. They are scheduled to be replaced in 2028.

== See also ==
- Blue Pullmans
- Train categories in Europe
- List of high-speed trains
- Inter-city rail in the United Kingdom
- High-speed rail in the United Kingdom

== Sources ==
- Marsden, Colin (2001). HST: Silver Jubilee. Ian Allan Publishing. ISBN 0-7110-2847-8.
