= British Rail Class 41 (HST) =

Diesel-electric powercars (1972–1982)

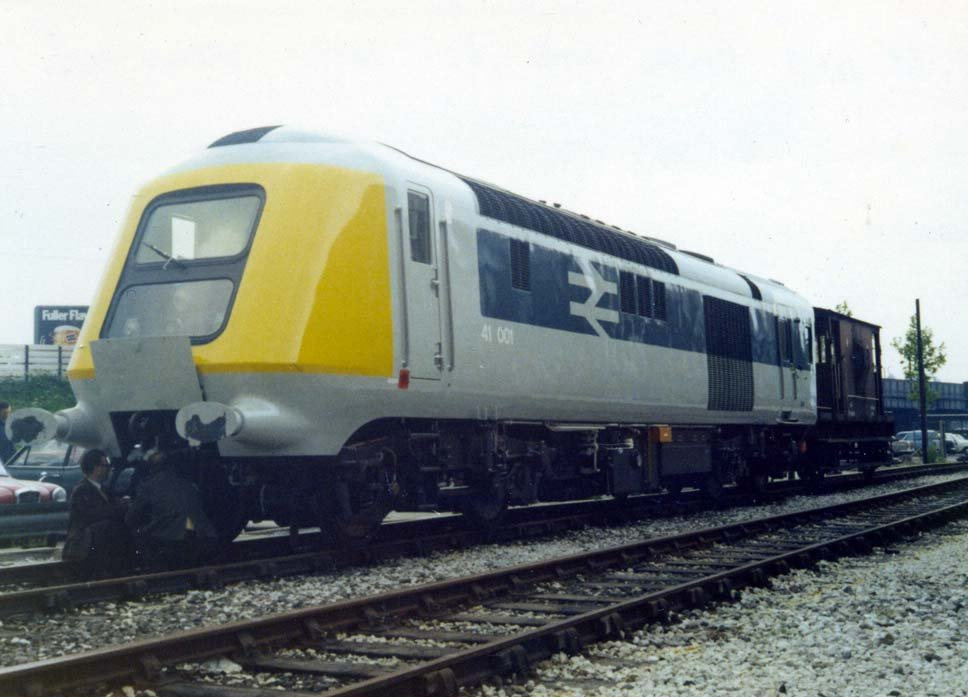
- 41001 at the Railway Technical Centre in 1972
Type and origin
- Power type: Diesel-electric
- Builder: BREL Crewe Works
- Build date: 1972
- Total produced: 2
Specifications
- Configuration
  - UIC: Bo′Bo′
  - Commonwealth: Bo-Bo
- Gauge: 4 ft 8 1/2 in (1,435 mm) standard gauge
- Wheel diameter: 3 ft 4 in (1.016 m)
- Wheelbase: 42 ft 4 in (12.90 m)
- Length: 56 ft 4 in (17.17 m)
- Width: 8 ft 11 in (2.72 m)
- Height: 12 ft 10 in (3.91 m)
- Loco weight: 68.5 tonnes (67.4 long tons; 75.5 short tons)
- Fuel type: Diesel
- Prime mover: Paxman Valenta 12RP200L
- Traction motors: Brush TMH68-46, frame mounted
- MU working: Within class only
- Train heating: 415 V AC 3-phase (prototype); 1000 V DC Electric Train Heat (preservation)
- Train brakes: Air
Performance figures
- Maximum speed: 125 mph (201 km/h)
- Power output: Engine: 2,250 bhp (1,678 kW)
- Tractive effort: 17,980 lbf (80.0 kN)
Career
- Operators: British Rail
- Numbers: 41001–41002; 43000-43001 (While 252001); later ADB975812–813
- Axle load class: Route availability 5
- Withdrawn: January 1982
- Disposition: 1 preserved, 1 scrapped

The British Rail Class 41 were two power cars built in 1972 by British Rail Engineering Limited's Crewe Works to operate with the prototype High Speed Train (HST) with Mark 3 carriages.

== History ==
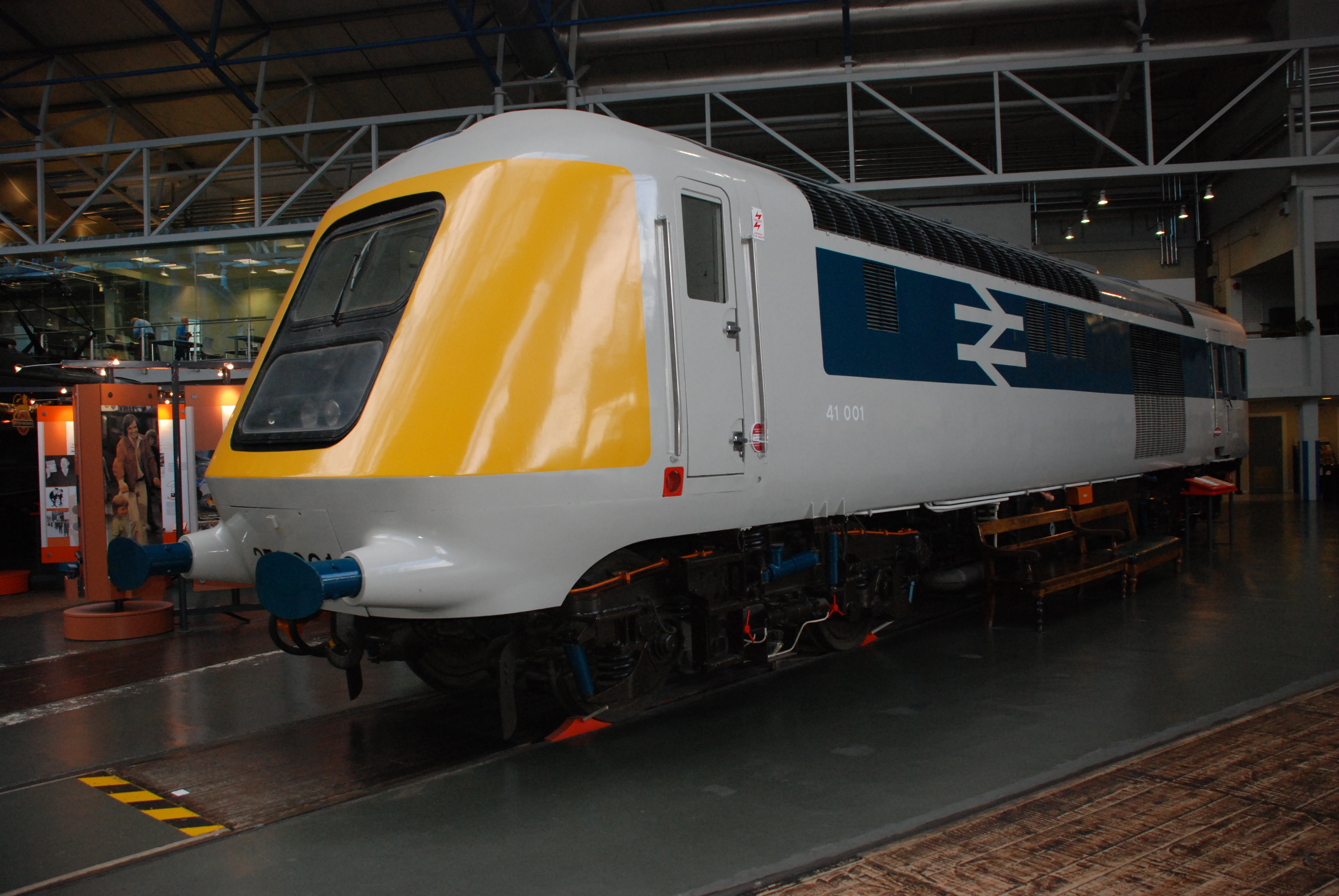
41001 front view

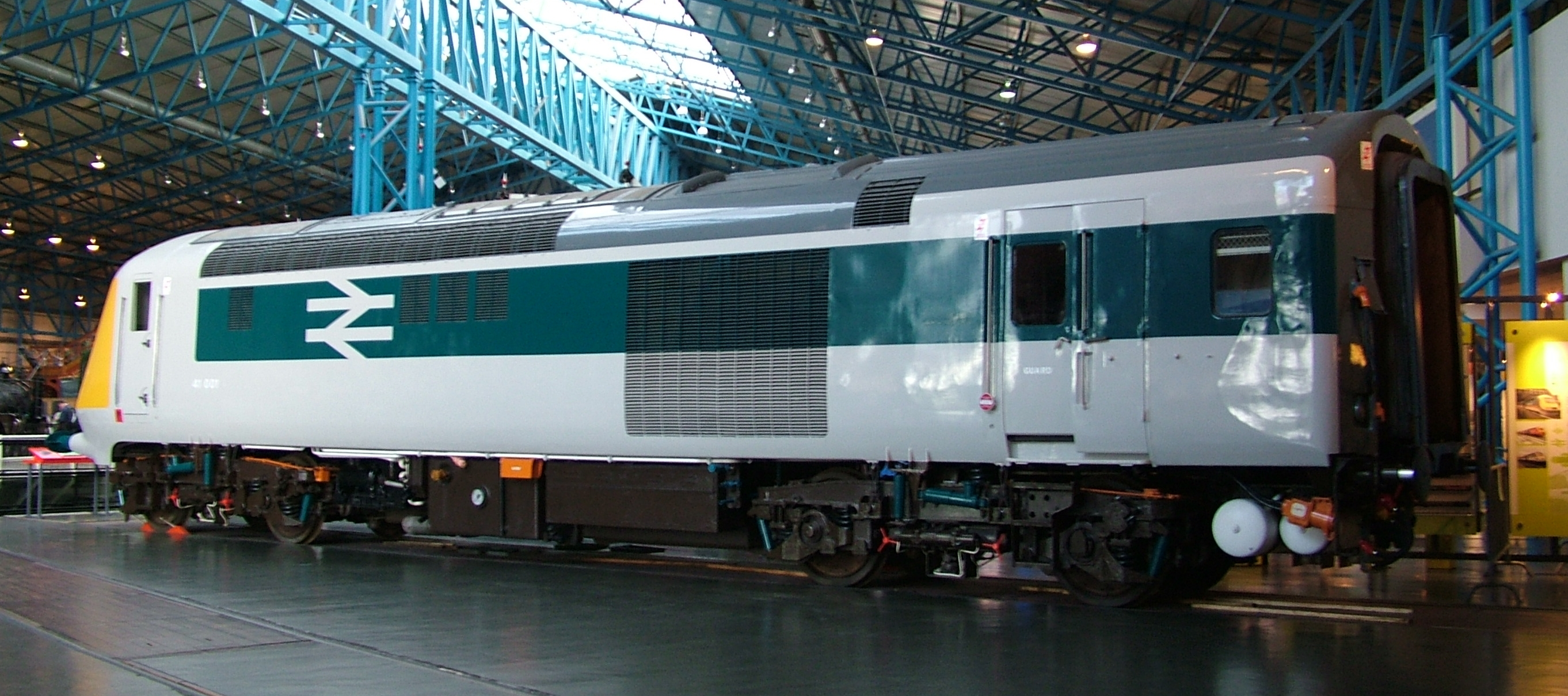
41001 rear/side view

Two power cars were built in 1972 by British Rail Engineering Limited's Crewe Works, numbered 41001 and 41002. They initially conducted tests on the East Coast Main Line with the set based at Neville Hill TMD.

Having accumulated more than 100,000 miles (160,000 km), including setting a diesel train speed record of 143 mph (230 km/h) between Northallerton and Thirsk in June 1973, they moved to the Great Western Main Line in 1974. On 5 May 1975, both entered revenue service on Great Western services between London Paddington and Bristol Temple Meads / Weston-super-Mare.

After the Class 252 re-classification they were renumbered into the carriage numbering range as 43000 and 43001.

After being replaced by production Class 43 HST powercars in the early 1980s, both were allocated to the Railway Technical Centre and used in various high speed trials associated with the Advanced Passenger Train and InterCity 225 projects. In December 1990, 41002 was scrapped by CF Booth in Rotherham, while 41001 was restored cosmetically and donated to the National Railway Museum.

In 2011, the National Railway Museum agreed a lease with the 125 Group that resulted in 41001 moving from York to Neville Hill TMD in March 2012 to be restored to operational condition. As part of this move, it was re-registered on TOPS as Class 43/9 locomotive 43000.

Upon completion it was based at the Great Central Railway (Nottingham). In November 2014, 41001 hauled its first passenger train since 1976, a special named the Screaming Valenta, using a short-formed East Midlands Trains HST set with a Class 43 on the other end.

After suffering engine problems at the Keighley & Worth Valley Railway in May 2019, it was moved to Neville Hill TMD for repairs.

In October 2019, the National Railway Museum announced it had terminated the loan agreement, citing serious contract breaches. Although that was disputed by the 125 Group, 41001 was returned to the museum in November 2019.

== Models ==
Examples of the prototype have been produced in both OO and N gauge by Bachmann and Dapol respectively.
