= GC =

GC may stand for:

== People, jobs, characters ==
- The GC, the alter ego of English media personality and businesswoman Gemma Collins (born 1981)
- Genetic counselor, health professionals who primarily counsel individuals on risks related to various hereditary diseases
- GC (video game character), Blaster Learning System character

== Computing ==
- Graphics card, a common component in computers
- Garbage collection (computer science), a form of automatic memory management
- GenerativeComponents, computer-aided design software
- Global Catalog, a global listing of all objects in an Active Directory forest
- General Category of a Unicode symbol, see Unicode character property#General Category
- gc, the Go compiler

== Entertainment ==
- The GC, a New Zealand television series
- GameCube, a home video game console
- Games Convention, an annual video games event held in Leipzig, Germany
- Good Charlotte, American rock band

== Organizations ==
- General Catalyst, an American investment company
- Grasshopper Club Zürich, a Swiss sports club
- Green Council, an environmental organization based in Hong Kong
- Gurkha Contingent of the Singapore Police Force
- Guardia Civil (Civil Guard (Spain)), the civil guard or gendarmerie in Spain
- Government of Canada (.gc.ca)
- Groupe Consultatif Actuariel Européen, Actuarial Association of Europe, established in 1978
- Grinnell College, a private liberal arts college in Grinnell, Iowa
- Goshen College, a private liberal arts college in Goshen, Indiana

== Science ==
- GC (gene), encodes the vitamin D-binding protein also known as gc-globulin
- g_{c}, a unit conversion factor used in engineering
- GC-content, a sequence composition of DNA molecules in genetics
- Galactic Center, the core region of the Milky Way galaxy
- Gallocatechol, a plant polyphenol molecule
- Gas chromatography, in analytical chemistry
- Germinal center, an area in a lymph node
- Gigacoulomb, an SI symbol for electric charge equal to 10^{9} coulomb
- Gigacycles per second (Gc), an older term for gigahertz
- Globular Cluster, a type of star cluster
- Granular component, a component of the nucleolus
- Glass carbomer, a type of dental composite filling
- Glucocorticoids, a class of steroid hormones
- Guanylate cyclase, an enzyme catalysing the synthesis of cyclic-GMP from GTP
- Neisseria gonorrhoeae or gonococcus, the causative agent of gonorrhea
- Clayey gravel, in the Unified Soil Classification System
- Crystallized intelligence (abbreviated Gc), a part of fluid and crystallized intelligence
- GC, star designation from the Boss General Catalogue

== Transportation ==
- Gambia International Airlines (IATA code GC), the national airline of the Gambia
- Georgia Central Railway, a class III railroad in Georgia, United States
- Grand Central, a railway operator in England
- Gibraltar to Casablanca convoy (convoy code GC) in World War II
- GC, Mazda's first front-wheel drive midsize car platform
- GC, ID code for the first generation Subaru Impreza sedan
- GC-, the prefix for highways on Gran Canaria, Canary Islands, Spain

== Other ==
- gc (digraph), in some languages
- George Cross, the highest civil decoration of the United Kingdom
- Glivenko–Cantelli theorem, in probability
- GC, the DIN code for pigment-coated, virgin mechanical pulp paperboard
- General classification, the overall standing on time in multi-stage bicycle races
- geocaching, a technology-based outdoor activity
- golden cross of moving average crossover
- Google Classroom
- Greenland Cup, association football tournament
- Group chat, a term used to describe any form of synchronous conferencing

== See also ==
- GCS (disambiguation)
- CG (disambiguation)
