= Rail transport in Great Britain =

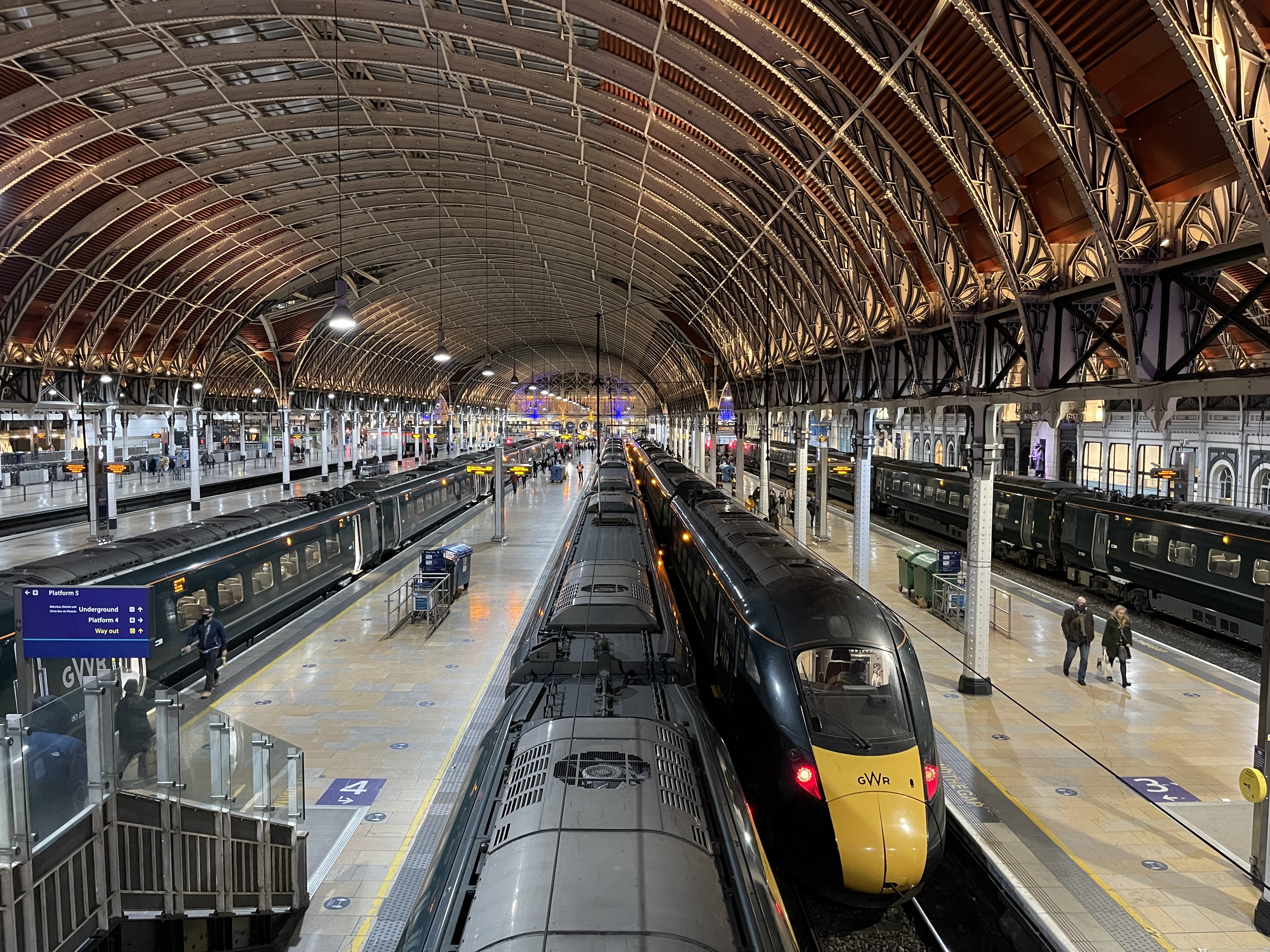
- Trains at London Paddington in 2021, one of Great Britain's busiest stations

Operation
- National railway: Great British Railways (planned from 2026)
- Infrastructure company: Network Rail
- Major operators: National Rail franchisees; Open-access operators; State-owned operators

Statistics
- Ridership: 1.829 billion (2025/26)
- Passenger-distance: 42.1 mi (67.7 km) billion (2025/26)
- Freight: 15.76 billion net tkm (2023/24)

System length
- Total: 9,797 mi (15,766 km)
- Electrified: 3,862 mi (6,216 km)

Features
- Longest tunnel: Channel Tunnel 31.35 mi (50.46 km) (partwise in France)
- Longest bridge: London Bridge – Greenwich Railway Viaduct 3.45 mi (5.55 km)
- No. of stations: 2,595
- Max elevation: Pass of Drumochter (Highland Main Line) 1,484 ft (452 m) at 56.85456°N 4.24858°W
Map
- Map of Great Britain's rail transport infrastructure, showing number of tracks, electrification and maximum speed

The railway system in Great Britain is the oldest railway system in the world. The first locomotive-hauled public railway opened in 1825, which was followed by an era of rapid expansion. Most of the track is managed by Network Rail, which in 2024 had a network of 9,797 miles (15,766 km) of standard-gauge lines, of which 3,862 miles (6,216 km) were electrified. In addition, some cities have separate metro, light rail and tram systems, among them the historic London Underground and the Glasgow Subway. There are also many private railways, some of them narrow-gauge, which are primarily short lines for tourists. The main rail network is connected with that of continental Europe by the Channel Tunnel and High Speed 1, opened in 1994 and 2007 respectively.

In 2026, there were 1.829 billion journeys on the National Rail network, making the British network the fifth most used in the world (Great Britain ranks 23rd in world population). Unlike a number of other countries, rail travel in the United Kingdom has enjoyed a renaissance in recent years, with passenger numbers approaching their highest ever level (see usage figures below). This has coincided with the privatisation of British Rail, but the cause of this increase is unclear. The growth is partly attributed to a shift away from private motoring due to growing road congestion and increasing petrol prices, but also to the overall increase in travel due to affluence. Passenger journeys in Britain grew by 88% over the period 1997–98 to 2014 as compared to 62% in Germany, 41% in France and 16% in Spain.

The United Kingdom is a member of the International Union of Railways (UIC). The UIC country code for United Kingdom is 70. The UK has the 17th largest railway network in the world; despite many lines having closed in the 20th century, due to the Beeching cuts, it remains one of the densest networks. It is one of the busiest railways in Europe, with 20% more train services than France, 60% more than Italy, and more than Spain, Switzerland, the Netherlands, Portugal and Norway combined, as well as representing more than 20% of all passenger journeys in Europe. The rail industry employs 115,000 people and supports another 250,000 through its supply chain.

After the initial period of rapid expansion following the first public railways in the early 19th century, from about 1900 onwards the network suffered from gradual attrition, and more severe rationalisation in the 1950s and 1960s. However, the network has again been growing since the 1980s. The UK was ranked eighth among national European rail systems in the 2017 European Railway Performance Index for intensity of use, quality of service and safety performance. To cope with increasing passenger numbers, there is a large programme of upgrades to the network, including Thameslink, Crossrail, electrification of lines, in-cab signalling, new inter-city trains and new high-speed lines.

== Historical overview ==
Current railway lines in Ireland, the United Kingdom and the Isle of Man are shown in black, metro lines in red, and former routes in green.

Rail passengers in Great Britain (millions) from 1829 to 2025, showing the early era of small railway companies, the amalgamation into the "Big Four", nationalisation and finally the current era of privatisation

According to historians David Brandon and Alan Brooke, the railways brought into being our modern world:

They stimulated demand for building materials, coal, iron and, later, steel. Excelling in the bulk movement of coal, they provided the fuel for the furnaces of industry and for domestic fireplaces. Millions of people were able to travel who had scarcely ever travelled before. Railways enabled mail, newspapers, periodicals and cheap literature to be distributed easily, quickly and cheaply allowing a much wider and faster dissemination of ideas and information. They had a significant impact on improving diet....[and enabled] a proportionately smaller agricultural industry was able to feed a much larger urban population....They employed huge quantities of labour both directly and indirectly. They helped Britain to become the 'Workshop of the World' by reducing transport costs not only of raw materials but of finished goods, large amounts of which were exported....[T]oday's global corporations originated with the great limited liability railway companies....By the third quarter of the nineteenth century, there was scarcely any person living in Britain whose life had not been altered in some way by the coming of the railways. Railways contributed to the transformation of Britain from a rural to a predominantly urban society.

The railways started with the local isolated wooden wagonways in 1560s using horses. These wagonways then spread, particularly in mining areas. The system was later built as a patchwork of local lines operated by small private railway companies. Over the course of the 19th and early 20th centuries, these amalgamated or were bought by competitors until only a handful of larger companies remained (see Railway Mania). The entire network was brought under state control during the First World War and a number of advantages of amalgamation and planning were revealed. However, the government resisted calls for the nationalisation of the network (first proposed by 19th century Prime Minister William Gladstone as early as the 1830s). Instead, from 1 January 1923, almost all the remaining companies were grouped into the "big four": the Great Western Railway, the London and North Eastern Railway, the London Midland and Scottish Railway and the Southern Railway companies (there were also a number of other joint railways such as the Midland and Great Northern Joint Railway and the Cheshire Lines Committee as well as special joint railways such as the Forth Bridge Railway, Ryde Pier Railway and at one time the East London Railway). The "Big Four" were joint-stock public companies and they continued to run the railway system until 31 December 1947.

The growth in road transport during the 1920s and 1930s greatly reduced revenue for the rail companies. Rail companies accused the government of favouring road haulage through the subsidised construction of roads. The railways entered a slow decline owing to a lack of investment and changes in transport policy and lifestyles. During World War II, the companies' managements joined, effectively forming one company. A maintenance backlog developed during the war and the private sector only had two years to deal with this after the war ended. After 1945, for both practical and ideological reasons, the government decided to bring the rail service into the public sector.

=== Nationalisation ===
From the start of 1948, the "big four" were nationalised to form British Railways (latterly British Rail) under the control of the British Transport Commission. Although BR was a single entity, it was divided into six (later five) regional authorities in accordance with the existing areas of operation. Though there were few initial changes to the service, usage increased and the network became profitable. Regeneration of track and railway stations was completed by 1954. In the same year, changes to the British Transport Commission, including the privatisation of road haulage, ended the coordination of transport in Great Britain. Rail revenue fell and in 1955 the network again ceased to be profitable. The mid-1950s saw the rapid introduction of diesel and electric rolling stock, but the expected transfer back from road to rail did not occur and losses began to mount.

The desire for profitability led to a major reduction in the network during the mid-1960s, with ICI manager Dr. Richard Beeching commissioned by the government under Ernest Marples with reorganising the railways. Many branch lines (and a number of main lines) were closed because they were deemed uneconomic ("the Beeching Axe" of 1963), removing much feeder traffic from main line passenger services. In the second Beeching report of 1965, only the "major trunk routes" were selected for large-scale investment, leading many to speculate the rest of the network would eventually be closed. This was never implemented by BR.

Passenger services experienced a renaissance with the introduction of the InterCity 125 trains in the 1970s. Passenger levels fluctuated since then, increasing during periods of economic growth and falling during recessions. The 1980s saw severe cuts in government funding and above-inflation increases in fares, In the early 1990s, the five geographical Regions were replaced by a Sectored organisation, in which passenger services were organised into InterCity, Network SouthEast and Regional Railways sectors.

=== Reorganisation and privatisation ===
The Railways Act 1993 divided the railways up, with Railtrack taking ownership of British Rail's property portfolio, tracks, signals, bridges and tunnels, Rolling Stock Operating Companies, and train operating companies.

Passenger transport services were bundled together into franchises to facilitate cross-subsidy within franchises, with many regulations on ticket prices and types, regulated fare increases and "Parliamentary service" obligations. Companies submitted bids to the franchising authority – often the Secretary of State for Transport, Passenger Transport Authority, or devolved government – competing for the lowest subsidy requirement and to invest in the railway over the lifespan of the franchise. There was also provision for subsidy between franchises, with profitable franchises demanding payments made to the government to cover a share of the losses from others. Examples of franchises included ScotRail, Great Western, and Southern Trains.

Open Access Operators are free to devise their own services and set fares unaffected by government regulations. Examples of such operators are Lumo and Grand Central, Hull Trains and Heathrow Express. In the case of the InterCity West Coast and InterCity East Coast franchises, applicants submitted bids to return the most money to the government from operating the service. This led to franchisees collapsing when passenger growth targets are not met, as promised payments to the government cannot be paid and the franchise is exited early.

In 2023, Network Rail held over £59.1 billion in debt, and made £1.176 billion of interest payments. Many of these debts were incurred by Railtrack and transferred to Network Rail when it collapsed.

British Rail operations were privatised during 1994–1997. Ownership of the track and infrastructure passed to Railtrack, whilst passenger operations were franchised to individual private sector operators (originally there were 25 franchises) and the goods services sold outright (six companies were set up, but five of these were sold to the same buyer). The government said privatisation would see an improvement in passenger services, and satisfaction (according to the National Rail Passenger survey) increased from 76% in 1999 (when the survey started) to 83% in 2013, and the number of passengers not satisfied with their journey had dropped from 10% to 6%. Since privatisation, passenger levels more than doubled, and surpassed their level in the late 1940s. Train fares cost 2.7% more than under British Rail in real terms on average. However, while the price of anytime and off-peak tickets increased, the price of Advance tickets dramatically decreased in real terms: the average Advance ticket in 1995 cost £9.14 (in 2014 prices) compared to £5.17 in 2014.

Rail fatalities per billion passenger-km in European countries during 2013

Rail subsidies increased from £3.3bn in 1992–93 to £4.4bn in 2015–16 (in current prices), although subsidy per journey fell from £4.39 per journey to £2.57 per journey. However, this masked great regional variation, as in 2014–15 funding varied from "£1.41 per passenger journey in England to £6.51 per journey in Scotland and £8.34 per journey in Wales."

The public image of rail travel was severely damaged by a series of significant accidents after privatisation. These included the Hatfield accident, caused by a rail fragmenting due to the development of microscopic cracks. Following this, the rail infrastructure company Railtrack imposed over 1,200 emergency speed restrictions across its network and instigated a costly nationwide track replacement programme. The consequent severe operational disruption to the national network and the company's spiralling costs set in motion a series of events which resulted in the collapse of the company and its replacement with Network Rail, a state-owned "not-for-profit" company, with risks underwritten by the taxpayer. According to the European Railway Agency, in 2013 Britain had the safest railways in Europe based on the number of train safety incidents.

In 2003 the first part of High Speed 1, a high-speed link to the Channel Tunnel and onward to France and Belgium, was completed, significantly adding to the rail infrastructure of the country. The rest of the link, from north Kent to London St Pancras, opened in 2007. A major programme of remedial work on the West Coast Main Line started in 1997 and finished in 2008.

Since the 2010s, several upgrades have been undertaken, such as Thameslink, Crossrail, the Northern Hub and electrification of the Great Western Main Line. Electrification plans for the Midland Main Line and the Transpennine line between Manchester and Leeds were scaled back. Construction of High Speed 2 between London and Birmingham began in 2020, and as of 2025 completion is expected sometime beyond 2033. Plans to extend the high-speed network to Manchester and Leeds were abandoned on cost grounds between 2021 and 2023.

A poll of 1,500 adults in Britain in June 2018 showed that 64% supported renationalising Britain's railways.

=== Renationalisation ===
Currently, six franchises are under public ownership, and thus effectively nationalised. Four, LNER, Northern Trains, Southeastern and TransPennine Express, are operators of last resort owned by the Department for Transport. Transport for Wales Rail is owned by Transport for Wales, a Welsh Government owned company, with no current plans to re-privatise the latter. On 1 April 2022, ScotRail was put under public ownership by the Scottish Government, under Transport Scotland as ScotRail operating on the same day.

The COVID-19 pandemic caused a huge fall in the number of passengers using the railways, with journeys in 2020 being about 22% of the previous year, before rising again as travel restrictions eased. During 2020, all train operating companies entered into emergency measures agreements with the UK and Scottish governments. Normal franchise mechanisms were amended, transferring almost all revenue and cost risk to the government, effectively 'renationalising' the network temporarily.

In September 2020, the UK Government permanently got rid of the rail franchising system. On 20 May 2021, the Government announced a white paper that would transform the operation of the railways. The rail network will be partly renationalised, with infrastructure and operations brought together under the state-owned public body Great British Railways. Operations will be managed on a concessions model. According to the BBC, this represents the largest shake-up in the UK's railways since privatisation. On 18 November 2021, the government announced the biggest ever public investment in Britain's rail network costing £96 billion and promising quicker and more frequent rail connections in the North and Midlands: the Integrated Rail Plan includes substantially improved connections north–south as well as east–west and includes three new high speed lines.

In July 2024, the new Labour government confirmed that passenger services would be brought back into public ownership upon the expiry of their contracts as part of the wider renationalisation of the rail network.

== Passenger services ==
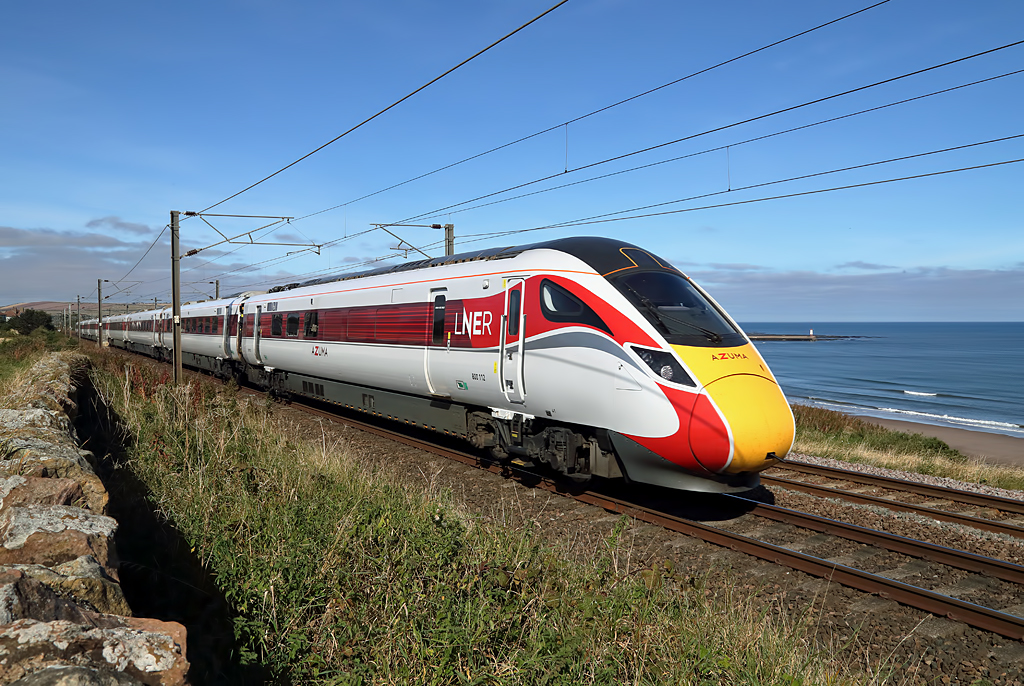
An LNER Class 800 Azuma train on the East Coast Main Line in Northumberland

Passenger services in Great Britain were divided into regional franchises and run by mostly private (that is, non-state owned) train operating companies from 1995 to 2020. These companies bid for seven- to eight-year contracts to run individual franchises. Most contracts in England were awarded by the Department for Transport (DfT), with the exception of Merseyrail, where the franchise is awarded by the Merseyside Passenger Transport Executive. In Scotland, contracts for ScotRail are awarded by Transport Scotland, and in Wales, contracts for Transport for Wales Rail are awarded by Transport for Wales, although the latter is currently state-owned with no plans for franchising in the near future and ScotRail was brought into public ownership in 2022. Initially there were 25 franchises, but some franchises were later combined and others nationalised. There are also a number of local or specialised rail services operated on an open access basis outside the franchise arrangements; examples include Heathrow Express and Hull Trains.

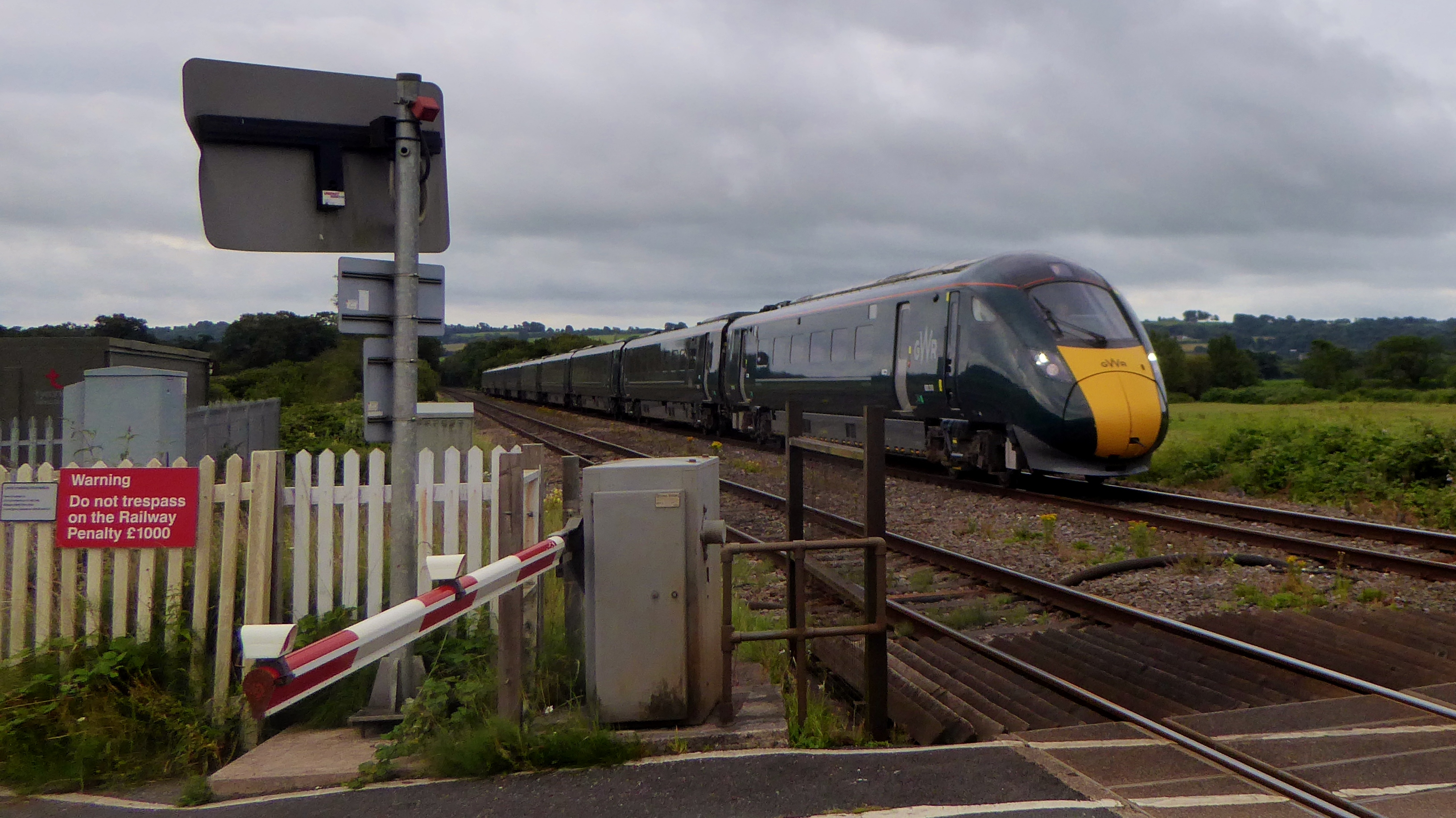
A GWR Class 800 Intercity Express Train on a service from London Paddington to Swansea

Many franchises were effectively abolished due to the financial effects of the COVID-19 pandemic.

The UK government proposed a new state-owned public body, Great British Railways, which would operate a concession contract system on the network from 2023. In November 2025, the DfT introduced the Railways Bill to establish Great British Railways which is set to be fully operational by late 2026. The bill is part of a broader strategy to create a more unified and straightforward rail system by putting infrastructure management and passenger services into public ownership.

In the 2015–16 operating year, franchised services provided 1,718 million journeys totalling (64.7 billion billion passenger km) of travel, an increase over 1994–5 of 117% in journeys (from 761 million) and just over doubling the passenger miles. The passenger-miles figure, after being flat from 1965 to 1995, surpassed the 1947 figure for the first time in 1998 and continued to rise steeply.

The key index used to assess passenger train performance is the Public Performance Measure, which combines figures for punctuality and reliability. From a base of 90% of trains arriving on time in 1998, the measure dipped to 75% in mid-2001 due to stringent safety restrictions put in place after the Hatfield crash in October 2000. However, in June 2015 the PPM stood at 91.2% after a period of steady increases in the annual moving average since 2003 until around 2012 when the improvements levelled off.

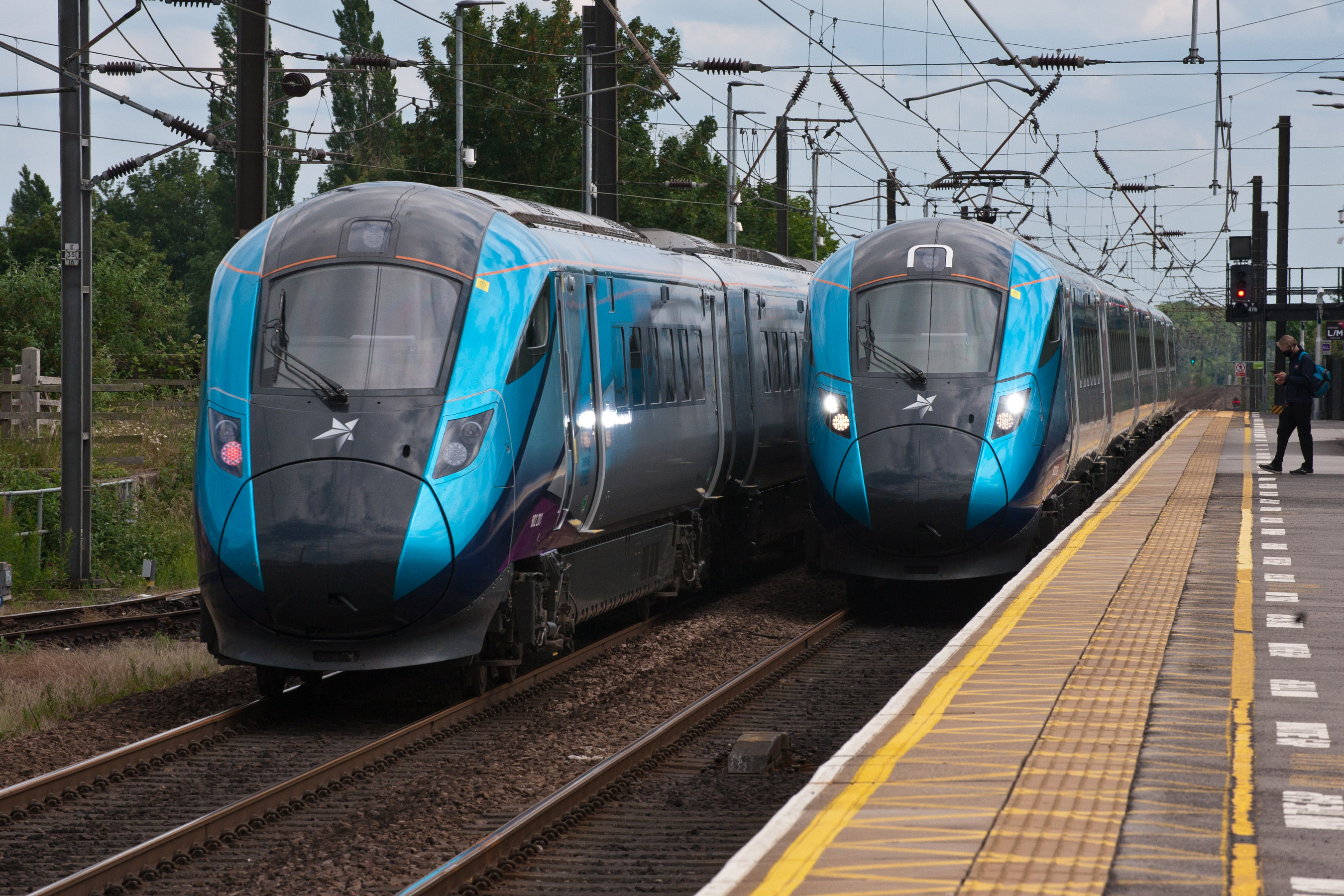
Two TransPennine Express Class 802 Nova 1 units passing through North Yorkshire

Train fares cost 2.7% more than under British Rail in real terms on average. For some years, Britain has been said to have the highest rail fares in Europe, with peak-time and season tickets considerably higher than other countries, partly because rail subsidies in Europe are higher. However, passengers are also able to obtain some of the cheapest fares in Europe if they book in advance for travel at off-peak times or purchase 'day-return' tickets which cost little more than a single ticket.

UK rail operators point out rail fare increases have been at a substantially lower rate than petrol prices for private motoring. The difference in price has also been blamed on the fact Britain has the most restrictive loading gauge (maximum width and height of trains that can fit through tunnels, bridges etc.) in the world which means the trains must be significantly narrower and less tall than those used elsewhere. This means trains cannot be bought "off-the-shelf" and must be specially built to fit British standards.

Average rolling-stock age fell slightly from the third quarter of 2001–02 to 2017–18, from 20.7 years old to 19.6 years old, and large orders from Bombardier and its acquirer Alstom, as well as CAF, Hitachi and Stadler, brought down the average age to around 15 years by March 2021.

Although passengers rarely have cause to refer to either document, all travel is subject to the National Rail Conditions of Travel and all tickets are valid subject to the rules set out in a number of so-called technical manuals, which are centrally produced for the network.

=== Annual journey numbers ===
Below are the estimated total number of journeys using heavy rail transport in Britain for each financial year. (This table does not include Eurostar, Underground or light rail services)

Annual journey numbers
Year	Numbers (Note: Passenger numbers plus interchanges)	% change
2004–2005	1,044,566,371	
2005–2006	1,081,747,031	▲3.59
2006–2007	1,150,271,272	▲6.77
2007–2008	1,223,235,485	▲6.36
2008–2009	1,271,934,558	▲3.10
2009–2010	1,264,168,068	▼7.62
2010–2011	1,350,664,449	▲6.84
2011–2012	1,456,276,046	▲7.82
2012–2013	1,497,670,627	▲2.84
2013–2014	1,583,380,750	▲5.72
2014–2015	1,650,407,344	▲4.23
2015–2016	1,713,518,682	▲3.82
2016–2017	1,727,475,717	▲0.81
2017–2018	1,703,998,197	▼1.36
2018–2019	1,752,982,619	▲2.87
2019–2020	1,738,739,779	▼0.81
2020–2021	387,885,468	▼77.69
2021–2022	990,050,962	▲155.24
2022–2023	1,384,786,829	▲39.87
2023–2024	1,611,953,591	▲16.40
2024–2025	1,728,704,107	▲7.24
2025–2026	1,829,468,292	▲5.83

The following table is according to the Office of Rail and Road and includes open access operators such as Grand Central and Hull Trains.

Annual passenger numbers (millions)
Year	Long distance	London and South East	Regional	Non-franchised operators	Total	Total % change
2002–2003	77.2	679.1	219.2	0	975.5	
2003–2004	81.5	690.0	240.2	0	1,011.7	▲3.71
2004–2005	83.7	704.5	251.3	0	1,039.5	▲2.75
2005–2006	89.5	719.7	267.3	0	1,076.5	▲3.56
2006–2007	99.0	769.5	276.5	0	1,145.0	▲6.36
2007–2008	103.9	828.4	285.8	0	1,218.1	▲6.38
2008–2009	109.4	854.3	302.8	0	1,266.5	▲3.97
2009–2010	111.6	842.2	304.0	1.4	1,259.3	▼0.68
2010–2011	117.9	917.6	318.2	1.8	1,355.6	▲7.65
2011–2012	125.3	993.8	340.9	1.5	1,461.5	▲7.82
2012–2013	127.7	1,032.4	340.9	1.7	1,502.6	▲2.81
2013–2014	129.0	1,106.9	350.5	1.9	1,588.3	▲5.70
2014–2015	134.2	1,154.9	364.7	2.1	1,655.8	▲4.25
2015–2016	138.3	1,202.8	374.2	2.3	1,717.6	▲3.72
2016–2017	143.5	1,196.8	388.7	2.4	1,731.5	▲0.80
2017–2018	144.8	1,171.2	389.6	2.4	1,707.9	▼1.40
2018–2019	146.7	1,216.9	392.8	2.5	1,759.9	▲3.0

=== Stations ===
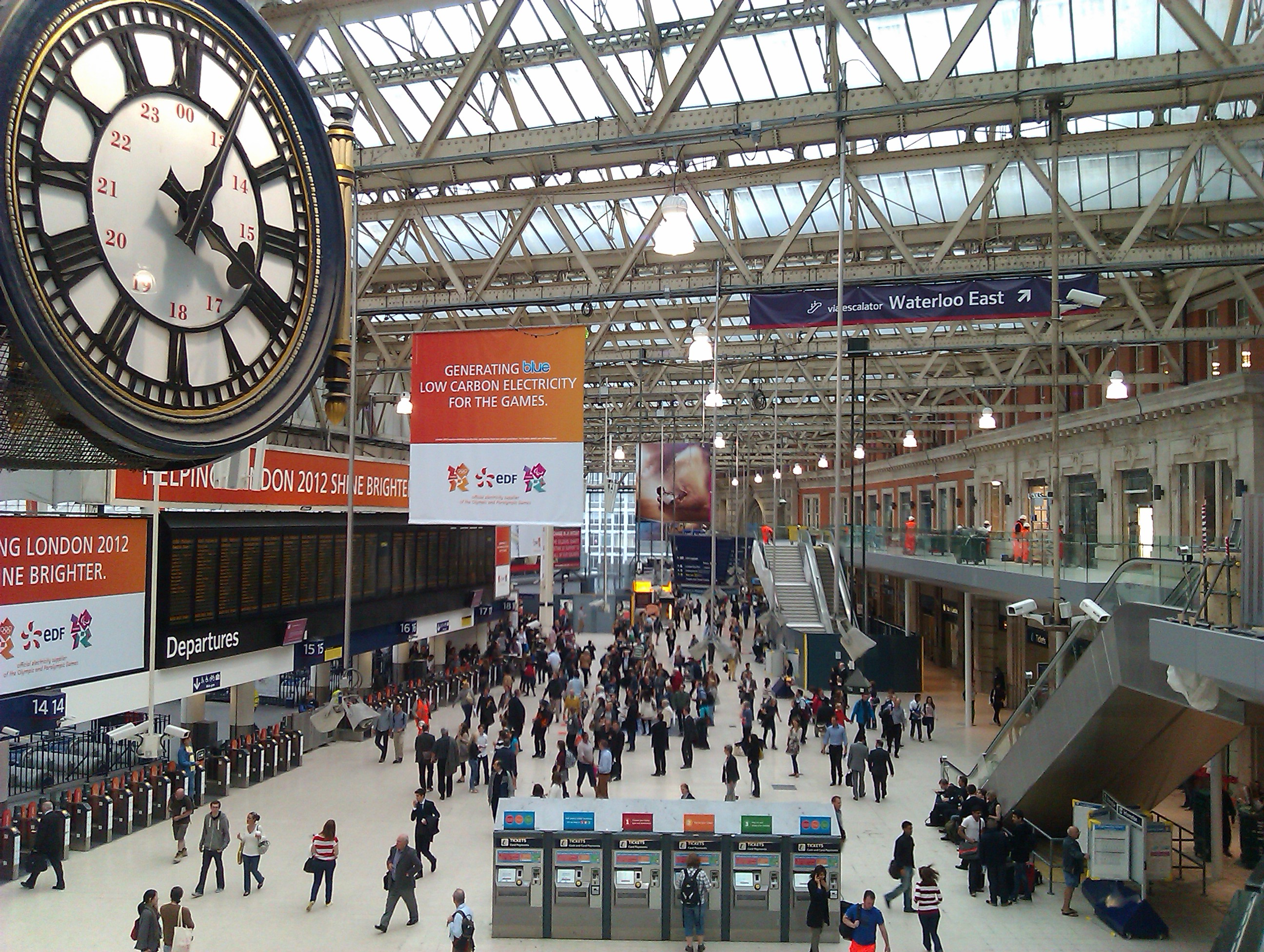
London Waterloo station is the busiest railway station in the UK. It is also the country's largest station in terms of floor space and has the greatest number of platforms.

There are 2,597 passenger railway stations on the Network Rail network. This does not include the London Underground, nor other systems which are not part of the national network, such as heritage railways. Most date from the Victorian era and a number are in or on the edge of town and city centres. Major stations lie for the most part in large cities, with the largest conurbations (e.g. Birmingham, Bristol, Cardiff, Edinburgh, Glasgow, Liverpool, and Manchester) typically having more than one main station. London is a major hub of the network, with 12 main-line termini forming a "ring" around central London. Birmingham, Leeds, Manchester, Glasgow, Bristol and Reading are major interchanges for many cross-country journeys that do not involve London. However, some important railway junction stations lie in smaller cities and towns, for example York, Crewe and Ely. Some other places expanded into towns and cities because of the railway network. Swindon, for example, was little more than a village before the Great Western Railway chose to site its locomotive works there. In many instances geography, politics or military considerations originally caused stations to be sited further from the towns they served until, with time, these issues could be overcome (for example, Portsmouth had its original station at Gosport).

=== Inter-city ===
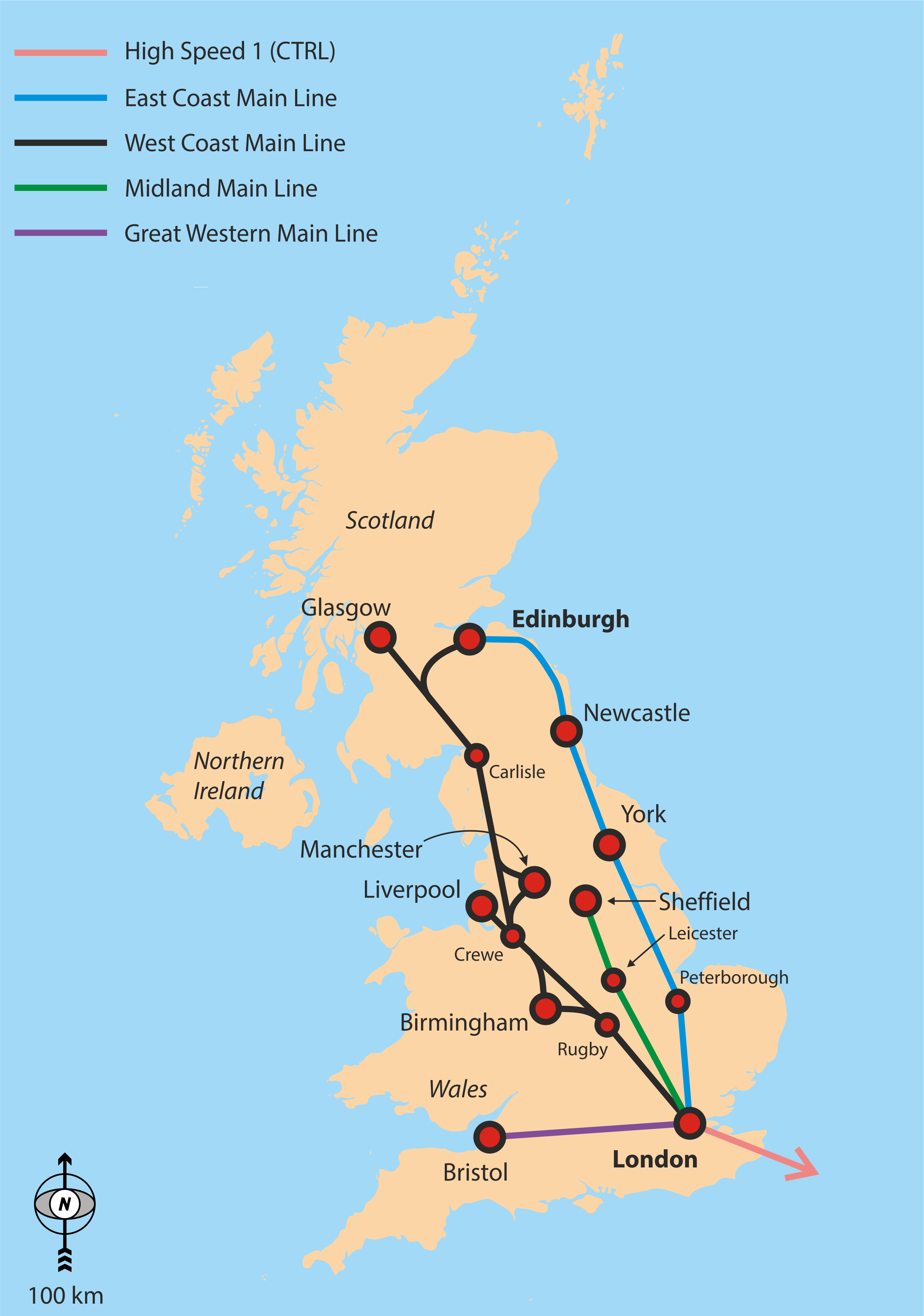
Overview map of the primary main lines in Great Britain

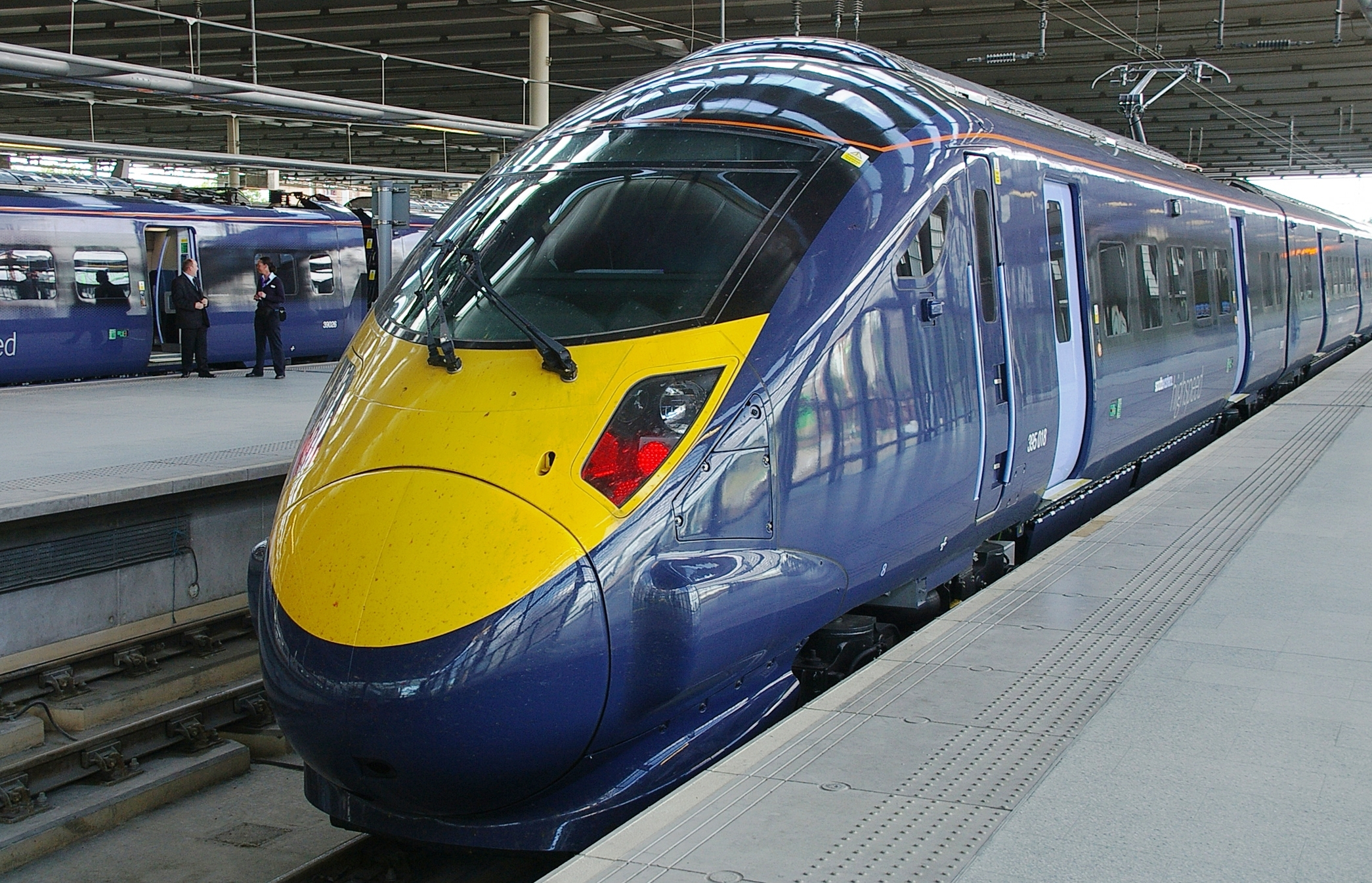
A Southeastern Class 395 Javelin at St Pancras railway station

High-speed inter-city rail (above 124 mph or 200 km/h) was first introduced in Great Britain in the 1970s by British Rail. BR had pursued two development projects in parallel, the development of a tilting train technology, the Advanced Passenger Train (APT), and development of a conventional high-speed diesel train, the High Speed Train (HST). The APT project was abandoned, but the HST design entered service as the British Rail Classes 253, 254 and 255 trains. The prototype HST, the Class 252, reached a world speed record for diesel trains of 143.2 mph (230.5 km/h), while the main fleet entered service limited to a service speed of 125 mph, and were introduced progressively on main lines across the country, with a rebranding of their services as the InterCity 125.

With electrification of the East Coast Main Line, high-speed rail in Great Britain was augmented with the introduction of the Class 91, intended for passenger service at up to 140 mph (230 km/h), and thus branded as the InterCity 225. The Class 91 units were designed for a maximum service speed of 140 mph, and running at this speed was trialled with a 'flashing green' signal aspect under the British signalling system. The trains were eventually limited to the same speed as the HST, to 125 mph, with higher speeds deemed to require cab signalling, which as of 2010 was not in place on the normal British railway network (but was used on the Channel Tunnel Rail Link). A final attempt by the nationalised British Rail at High Speed Rail was the cancelled InterCity 250 project in the 1990s for the West Coast Main Line.

Post privatisation, a plan to upgrade the West Coast Main Line to speeds of up to 140 mph with infrastructure improvements were finally abandoned, although the tilting train Class 390 Pendolino fleet designed for this maximum speed of service were still built and entered service in 2002, and operates limited to 125 mph. Other routes in the UK were upgraded with trains capable of top speeds of up to 125 mph running with the introduction between 2000 and 2005 of Class 180 Adelante DMUs and the Bombardier Voyager DEMUs (Classes 220, 221 and 222).

==== High Speed 1 ====
The first implementation of high-speed rail up to 186 mph in regular passenger service in Great Britain was the Channel Tunnel Rail Link (now known as High Speed 1), when its first phase opened in 2003 linking the British end of the Channel Tunnel at Folkestone with Fawkham Junction in Kent. This is used by international only passenger trains for the Eurostar service, using Class 373 and Class 374 trains. The line was later extended all the way into London St Pancras in 2007.

After the building of the first of a new Class 395 train fleet for use partly on High Speed 1 and parts of the rest of the UK rail network, the first domestic high-speed running over 125 mph (to about 140 mph) began in December 2009, including a special Olympic Javelin shuttle for the 2012 Summer Olympics. These services are operated by the South Eastern franchise.

==== Intercity Express Programme ====
The Intercity Express Programme for replacement of the domestic fleet of InterCity 125 and 225 trains on the existing national network was announced. In 2009 it was announced that the preferred rolling stock option for this project was the Hitachi Super Express family of multiple units, and they entered service in 2017 on the Great Western Main Line and in 2019 on the East Coast Main Line. The trains will be capable of a maximum speed of 140 mph with "minor modifications", with the necessary signalling modifications required of the Network Rail infrastructure in Britain likely to come from the phased rollout of the Europe-wide European Rail Traffic Management System (ERTMS).

==== Proposed and partly under construction ====
===== High Speed 2 =====
Following several studies and consultations on high-speed rail, in 2009 the UK Government formally announced the High Speed 2 project, establishing a company to produce a feasibility study to examine route options and financing for a new high-speed railway in the UK. This study began on the assumption the route would be a new purpose-built high-speed line connected to High-Speed 1 to the Channel tunnel and from London to the West Midlands, via Heathrow Airport, relieving traffic on the West Coast Main Line (WCML). Conventional high-speed rail technology would be used as opposed to Maglev. The rolling stock would be capable of travelling on the existing Network Rail infrastructure if required, with the route intersecting with the existing WCML and the East Coast Main Line (ECML). A cancelled second phase of the project was planned to reach further north to Manchester, Sheffield and Leeds, as well as linking into the Midland Main Line.

===== Northern Powerhouse Rail =====
In June 2014, the chancellor of the Exchequer, George Osborne, proposed a high-speed rail link Northern Powerhouse Rail (also known as High Speed 3 or High Speed North) between Liverpool and Newcastle/Sheffield/Hull. The line would use the existing route between Liverpool and Newcastle/Hull and a new route from to Sheffield will follow the same route to Manchester Victoria and then a new line from Victoria to Sheffield, with additional tunnels and other infrastructure.

==== High-speed rolling stock ====
As of August 2023, the following rolling stock on the British network is capable of 125 mph (200 km/h) or more:

Maximum speeds in mph (km/h)
Family	TOPS classification	Operator and name	Type	Recorded speed	Design speed	Speed in service
Siemens Velaro	374	Eurostar e320	EMU	219 (352)	200 (320)	186 (300)
TGV TMST	373	Eurostar e300	EMU	209 (334.7)	186 (300)	186 (300)
Hitachi A-train AT300	395	Southeastern Javelin	EMU	157 (252)	140 (225)	140 (225)
Hitachi A-train AT300	800	GWR IET; LNER Azuma	BMU	Not known	140 (225)	125 (200)
Hitachi A-train AT300	801	LNER Azuma	EMU		140 (225)	125 (200)
Hitachi A-train AT300	802	GWR IET; TransPennine Express Nova 1 Hull Trains Paragon	BMU		140 (225)	125 (200)
Hitachi A-train AT300	803	Lumo (unnamed)	EMU		140 (225)	125 (200)
Hitachi A-train AT300	805	Avanti West Coast Evero	BMU		140 (225)	125 (200)
Hitachi A-train AT300	807	Avanti West Coast Evero	EMU		140 (225)	125 (200)
Hitachi A-train AT300	810	EMR InterCity Aurora	BMU		140 (225)	125 (200)
InterCity 225	91 + Mark 4 coaches	LNER InterCity 225	Electric Loco	162 (261)	140 (225)	125 (200)
Alstom Pendolino	390	Avanti West Coast Pendolino	EMU	162 (261)	140 (225)	125 (200)
CAF Civity	397	TransPennine Express Nova 2	EMU		125 (200)	125 (200)
InterCity 125	43 (HST) + Mark 3 coaches	ScotRail Inter7City	Diesel Loco	148 (~240)	125 (200)	125 (200)
Class 67	67		Diesel Loco	143 (230)	125 (200)	125 (200)
Alstom Coradia	180	Grand Central Adelante	DHMU	125 (200)	125 (200)	125 (200)
Bombardier Voyager	220	CrossCountry Voyager	DEMU	125 (200)	125 (200)	125 (200)
Bombardier Voyager	221	Grand Central Super Voyager; CrossCountry Voyager	DEMU	125 (200)	125 (200)	125 (200)
Bombardier Voyager	222	EMR InterCity Meridian; Lumo	DEMU	125 (200)	125 (200)	125 (200)

In 2011, the fastest timetabled start-to-stop run by a UK domestic train service was the Hull Trains 07.30 King's Cross to Hull, which covered the 125.4 km (77.9 miles) from Stevenage to Grantham in 42 minutes at an average speed of 179.1 km/h (111.3 mph). This was operated by a Class 180 diesel unit running "under the wires" at the time, and is now operated by Class 802 Paragon bi-mode units, operating on electric power on this section. This was matched by several Leeds to London Class 91-operated East Coast trains if their two-minute recovery allowance for this section is excluded from the public timetable.

=== Local metro and other rail systems ===
Map of local urban rail networks

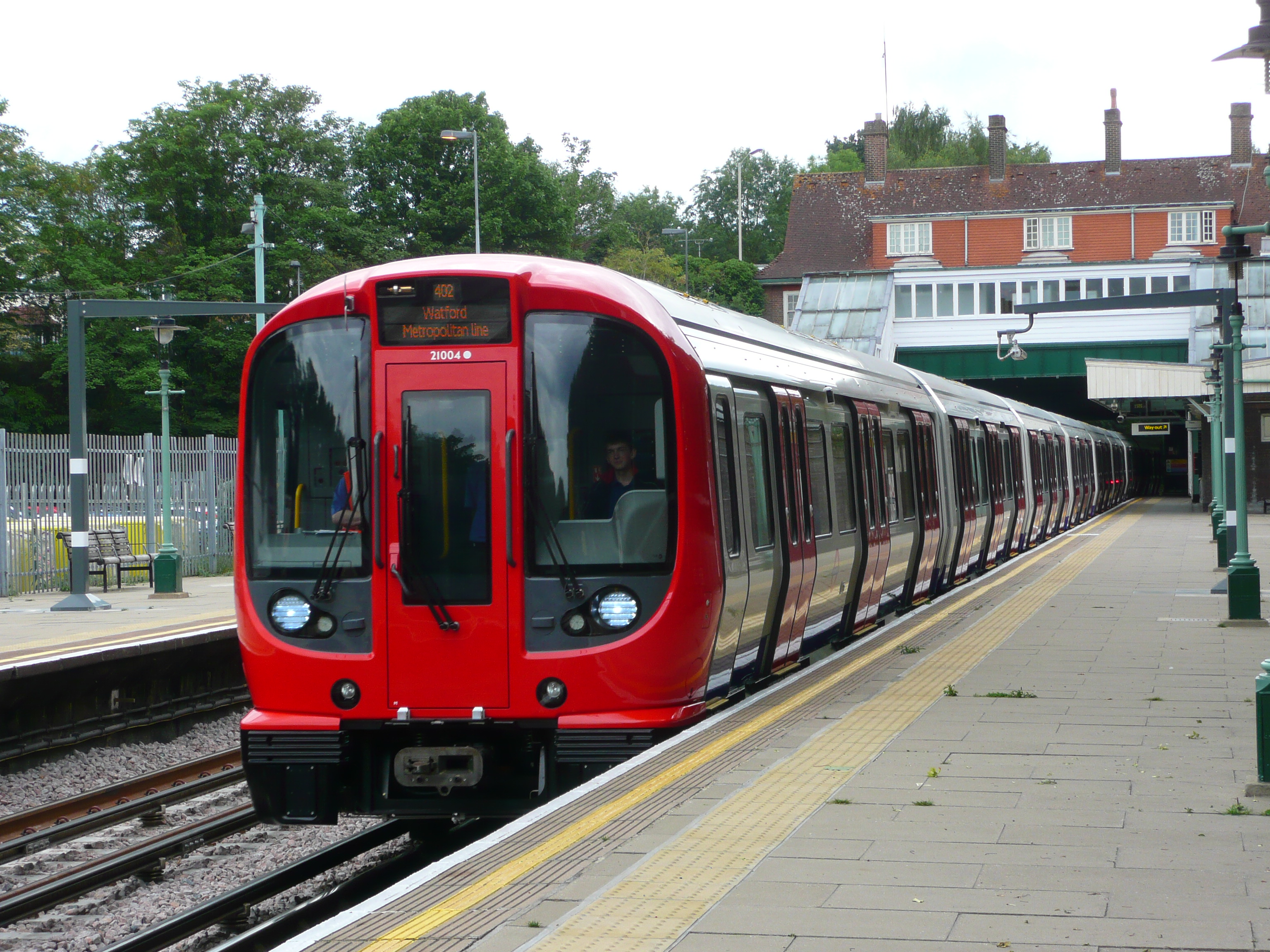
A London Underground S-stock train

A number of towns and cities have rapid transit networks. Underground technology is used in the Glasgow subway, Merseyrail centred on Liverpool, London Underground centred on London, London Overground and the London Docklands Light Railway centred on London, and the Tyne and Wear Metro centred on Newcastle upon Tyne.

Light rail systems in the form of trams are in Birmingham, Croydon, Manchester, Nottingham, Sheffield and Edinburgh. These systems use a combination of street running tramways and, where available, reserved right of way or former conventional rail lines in some suburbs. Blackpool has the one remaining traditional tram system. Monorails, heritage tramways, miniature railways and funiculars also exist in several places. In addition, there are a number of heritage (mainly steam) standard and narrow gauge railways, and a few industrial railways and tramways. Some lines which appear to be heritage operations sometimes claim to be part of the public transport network; the Romney, Hythe and Dymchurch Railway in Kent regularly transports schoolchildren.

Most major cities have some form of commuter rail network. These include Belfast, Birmingham, Bristol, Cardiff, Edinburgh, Exeter, Glasgow, Leeds, Liverpool, London and Manchester.

== Goods services ==
Million tonnes of rail freight moved in the UK from 1983 to 2021 (annual rolling average). There was a large decrease in coal carried in 1984–5 due to the miners' strike.

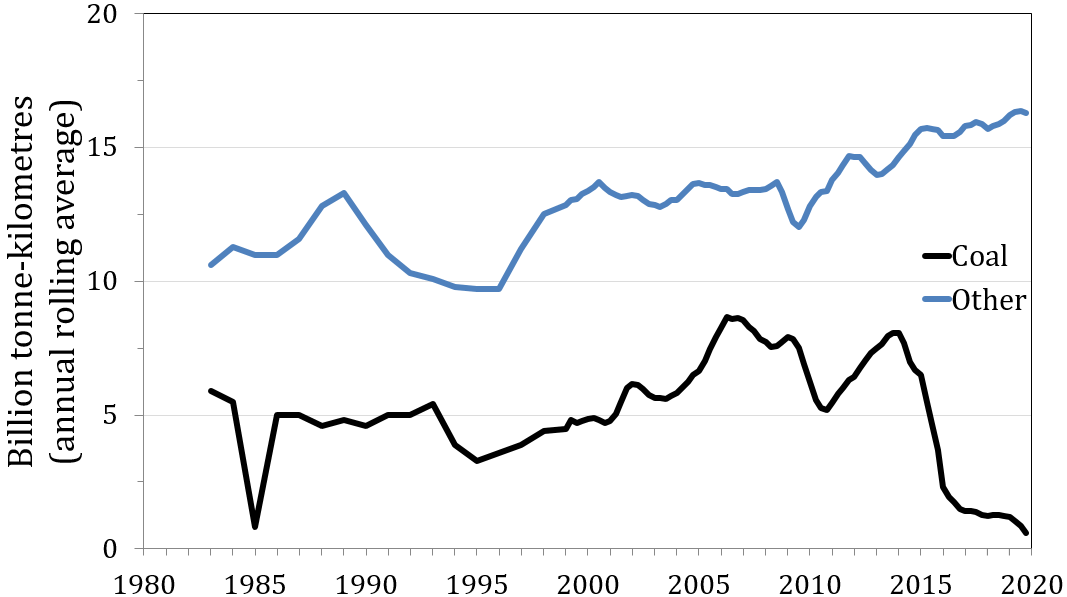
Billion tonne-kilometres of rail freight moved in the UK from 1983 to 2019

There are four main goods operating companies in the UK, the largest of which is DB Cargo UK (formerly DB Schenker, formerly English Welsh & Scottish (EWS)). There are also several smaller independent operators including Mendip Rail. Types of freight carried include intermodal – in essence containerised freight – and coal, metals, oil, and construction materials. The Beeching Cuts, in contrast to passenger services, greatly modernised the goods sector, replacing inefficient wagons with containerised regional hubs. Freight services had been in steady decline since the 1930s, initially because of the reduction in manufacturing and then road haulage's cost advantage in combination with higher wages. Since 1995, however, the amount of freight carried on the railways has increased sharply due to increased reliability and competition, as well as international services. In 2000, the Department for Transport's Transport Ten Year Plan called for an 80% increase in rail freight.

Statistics on freight are specified in terms of the weight of freight lifted, and the net tonne kilometre, being freight weight multiplied by distance carried. 116.6 million tonnes of freight was lifted in the 2013–4 period, against 138 million tonnes in 1986–7, a decrease of 16%. However, a record 22.7 billion net tonne kilometres (14 billion net ton miles) of freight movement were recorded in 2013–4, against 16.6 billion (10.1 billion) in 1986–7, an increase of 38%. Coal made up 36% of the total net tonne kilometre, though its share was declining. Rail freight had increased its market share since privatisation (by net tonne kilometres) from 7.4% in 1998 to 11.1% in 2013. Growth was partly due to more international services including the Channel Tunnel and Port of Felixstowe, which is containerised. Nevertheless, as of 2008, network bottlenecks and insufficient investment in catering for 9' 6" high shipping containers restricted growth.

A symbolic loss to the rail freight industry in Great Britain was the custom of the Royal Mail, which from 2004 discontinued use of its 49-train fleet, and switched to road haulage after a near 170-year-preference for trains. Mail trains had long been part of the tradition of the railways in Great Britain, famously celebrated in the film Night Mail, for which W. H. Auden wrote the poem of the same name. Although Royal Mail suspended mail trains in January 2004, this decision was reversed in December of the same year, and Class 325s are now used on some routes including between London, Warrington and Scotland.

== Train leasing services ==
At the time of privatisation, the rolling stock of British Rail was sold to the new operators, as in the case of the freight companies, or to the three ROSCOs (rolling stock companies) which lease or hire stock to passenger and freight train operators. Leasing is relatively commonplace in transport since it enables operating companies to avoid the complication associated with raising sufficient capital to purchase assets; instead, assets are leased and paid for from ongoing revenue. Since 1994 there has been a growth in smaller spot-hire companies that provide rolling stock on short-term contracts. Many of these have grown thanks to the selling-off of locomotives by the large freight operators, especially EWS.

Unlike other major players in the privatised railway system of Great Britain, the ROSCOs are not subject to close regulation by the economic regulatory authority. They were expected to compete with one another, and they do, although not in all respects.

=== Competition codes of practice ===
Since privatisation in 1995, the ROSCOs have faced criticism from several quarters – including passenger train operating companies such as GNER, Arriva and FirstGroup – on the basis they are acting as an oligopoly to keep lease prices higher than they would be in a competitive market. In 1998, Deputy Prime Minister John Prescott asked rail regulator John Swift to investigate the market's operation and make recommendations. Many believed Prescott favoured much closer regulation of the ROSCOs, perhaps bringing them into the net of contract-specific regulation, i.e., requiring every rolling stock lease to be approved by the Rail Regulator before it could be valid. Swift's report did not find major problems with the operation of what was then an infant market, and instead recommended the ROSCOs sign up to voluntary, non-binding codes of practice in relation to their future behaviour. Prescott did not like this, but he did not have the legislative time allocation to do much about it. Swift's successor as Rail Regulator, Tom Winsor, agreed with Swift and the ROSCOs were happy to go along with codes of practice, coupled with the Rail Regulator's new powers to deal with abuse of dominance and anti-competitive behaviour under the Competition Act 1998. In establishing these codes, the Rail Regulator made it clear he expected the ROSCOs to adhere to their letter and spirit. The codes of practice were duly put in place and for the next five years the Rail Regulator received no complaints about ROSCO behaviour.

=== White paper 2004 ===
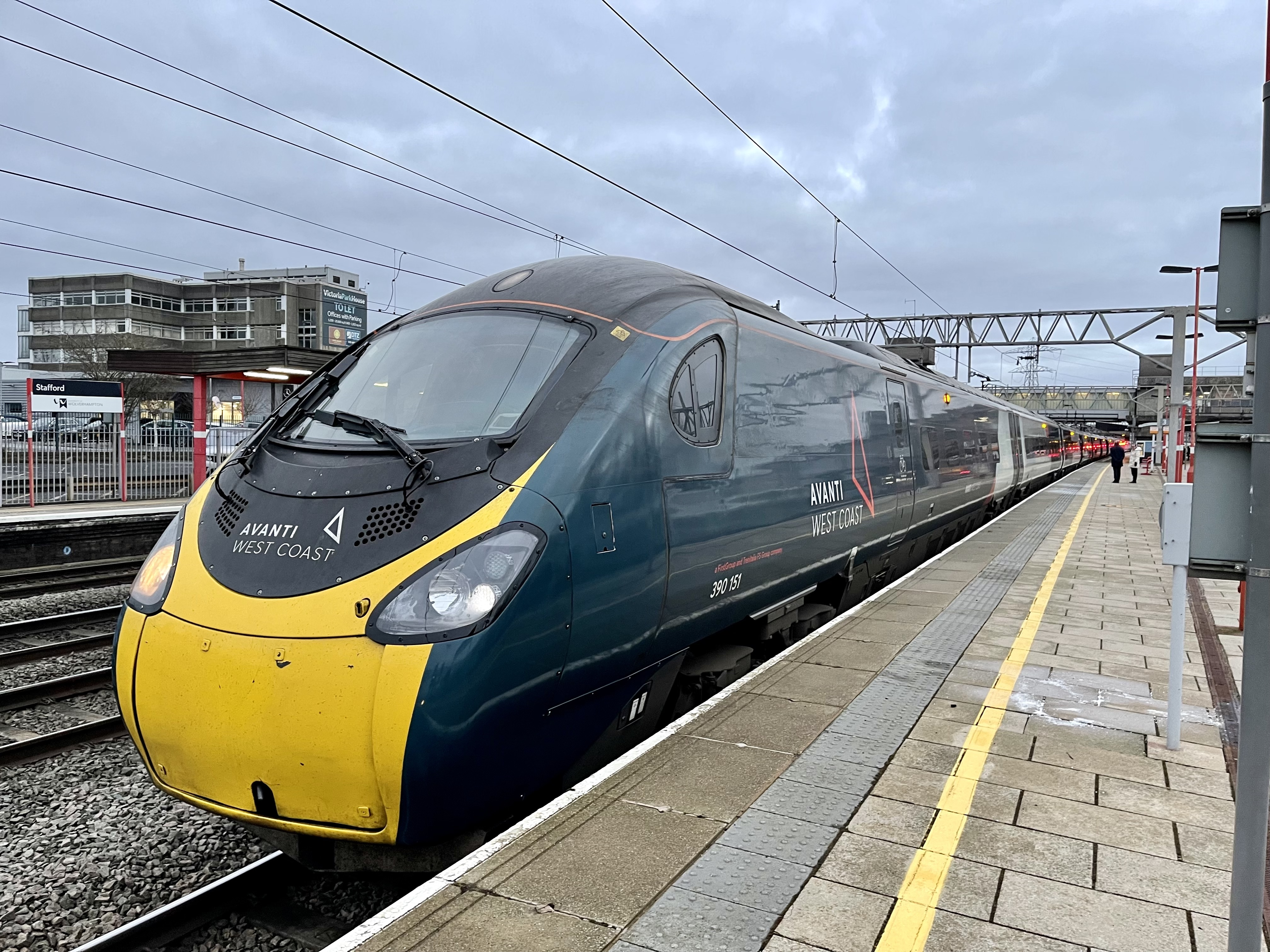
An Avanti West Coast Class 390 Pendolino train at Stafford station

In July 2004, the DFT's White Paper on the future of the railways expressed dissatisfaction with the operation of the rolling stock leasing market, and the belief there may have been excessive pricing on the part of the ROSCOs.

In June 2006, Gwyneth Dunwoody, chair of the Transport Select Committee of the House of Commons, called for an investigation into the companies. Transport commentator Christian Wolmar has asserted the high cost of leasing is due to the way the franchises are distributed to the train operating companies. While the TOCs are negotiating for a franchise they have some freedom to propose different rolling stock options. It is only once they have won the franchise, however, they start negotiating with the ROSCOs. The ROSCO will know the TOC's requirements and also knows the TOC has to obtain a fixed mix of rolling stock which puts the train operating company at a disadvantage in its negotiations with the ROSCO.

=== Competition Commission ===
On 29 November 2006, following a June 2006 complaint by the DfT alleging excessive pricing by the ROSCOs, the Office of Rail Regulation (as it was then called) announced it was minded to refer the operation of the market for passenger rolling stock to the Competition Commission, citing, amongst other factors, problems in the DfT's own franchising policy as responsible for what may be regarded as a dysfunctional market. ORR said it will consult the industry and the public on what to do, and will publish its decision in April 2007. If the ORR does refer the market to the Competition Commission, there may well be a hiatus in investment in new rolling stock whilst the ROSCOs and their parent companies wait to hear what return they will be allowed to make on their train fleets. This could have the unintended consequence of intensifying the problem of overcrowding on some routes because TOCs will be unable to lengthen their trains or acquire new ones if they need the ROSCOs to co-operate in their acquisition or financing. Some commentators have suggested that such an outcome would be detrimental to the public interest. This is especially striking since the National Audit Office, in its November 2006 report on the renewal and upgrade of the West Coast Main Line, said that the capacity of the trains and the network will be full in the next few years and advocated train lengthening as an important measure to cope with sharply higher passenger numbers.

The Competition Commission conducted an investigation and published provisional findings on 7 August 2008. The report was published on 7 April 2009. A press release summarised the recommendations as follows:

- introduce longer franchise terms (in the region of 12 to 15 years or longer), which would allow TOCs to realise the benefits and recover the costs of switching to alternative new or used rolling stock over a longer period, which should increase the incentives and ability for TOCs to exercise choice
- assess the benefits of alternative new or used rolling stock proposals beyond the franchise term and across other franchises when evaluating franchise bids. This will encourage a wider choice of rolling stock to be considered in franchise proposals, irrespective of franchise length
- ensure franchise invitations to tender (ITTs) are specified in such a way franchise bidders are allowed a choice of rolling stock
- requiring the ROSCOs to remove non-discrimination requirements from the Codes of Practice, which would provide greater incentives for the TOCs to seek improved terms from the ROSCOs
- requiring rolling stock lessors to provide TOCs with a set list of information when making a lease rental offer for used rolling stock, which would give TOCs the ability to negotiate more effectively

=== Leasing companies (ROSCOs) ===
Three companies took over British Rail's rolling stock on privatisation:

- Angel Trains – has 4,400 vehicles in the UK owned by AMP Capital Investors, PSP Investments and International Public Partnerships.
- Eversholt Rail Group – owns a fleet of over 4,000 vehicles and is owned by CK Hutchison Holdings and Cheung Kong Infrastructure Holdings.
- Porterbrook – leases some 3,500 locomotives, trains and freight wagons; owned by a consortium including Alberta Investment Management Corporation, Allianz, Électricité de France and Vantage Infrastructure.

A number of other companies have since entered the leasing market. These include:

- Sovereign Trains – part of the same group as the open-access operator Grand Central. Sovereign Trains owned the rolling stock operated by Grand Central. Dissolved after the stock was sold to Angel Trains.
- QW Rail Leasing – a joint venture between the National Australia Bank and SMBC Leasing & Finance to provide the EMU rolling stock to London Overground.
- Macquarie European Rail – in April 2009, Lloyds TSB entered the rolling stock market by funding the purchase of 30 new Class 379s for National Express East Anglia. In November 2012, Lloyds sold the company to Macquarie Group.
- Beacon Rail owns Class 68 and Class 88 locomotives, as well as Class 220, Class 313 and Class 221 DMUs.
- UK Rail Leasing owns some Class 56 locomotives.
- Rock Rail owns Class 717 Siemens Desiro EMUs in service on Govia Thameslink Railway's Great Northern routes, Stadler Flirt Class 745 EMUs and Class 755 BMUs on Abellio's Greater Anglia franchise, Bombardier Aventra Class 701 EMUs on FirstGroup and MTR's South Western franchise, Hitachi Intercity BMUs for service on Abellio's East Midlands franchise and Hitachi Intercity EMUs and BMUs for service on First Group and Trenitalia's Avanti West Coast franchise.

=== Spot-hire companies ===
Spot-hire companies provide short-term leasing of rolling stock.

- MiddlePeak Railways, a locomotive hire & lease company with a stock of locomotives similar to Class 08 & NS 0-6-0 600 Class shunting locomotives, other locomotives, rolling stock & parts.
- GL Railease, owned by GATX Capital and Lombard, a subsidiary of the Royal Bank of Scotland.
- Harry Needle Railroad Company, an industrial and main line locomotive hire and overhaul company. Operates Class 08 shunting locomotives, and Class 20 locomotives.
- Riviera Trains, a spot-hire company with a fleet of Class 47 locomotives. This company works closely with DB Cargo UK.
- West Coast Railways, a spot-hire and railtour operator with a stock of Class 37 and Class 47 locomotives, as well as the rebuilt Class 57 locomotive.
- Eastern Rail Services, a rolling stock spot-hire company, providing leasing and hire, acquisition, parts supply and overhaul and technical advice.

== Statutory framework ==
Railways in Great Britain are in the private sector, but they are subject to control by central government, and to economic and safety regulation by arms of government. The British Transport Police are the special police force responsible for policing the railways in England, Wales and Scotland.

In 2006, using powers in the Railways Act 2005, the DfT took over most of the functions of the now wound up Strategic Rail Authority. The DfT now itself runs competitions for the award of passenger rail franchises, and, once awarded, monitors and enforces the contracts with the private sector franchisees. Franchises specify the passenger rail services which are to be run and the quality and other conditions (for example, the cleanliness of trains, station facilities and opening hours, the punctuality and reliability of trains) which the operators have to meet. Some franchises receive a subsidy from the DfT for doing so, and some are cash-positive, which means the franchisee pays the DfT for the contract. Some franchises start life as subsidised and, over their life, move to being cash-positive.

The other regulatory authority for the privatised railway is the Office of Rail and Road (previously the Office of Rail Regulation), which, following the Railways Act 2005, is the combined economic and safety regulator. It replaced the Rail Regulator on 5 July 2004. The Rail Safety and Standards Board still exists, however; established in 2003 on the recommendations of a public inquiry, it leads the industry's progress in health and safety matters.

The principal modern railway statutes are:

- Railways Act 1993
- Competition Act 1998 (insofar as it confers competition powers on the Office of Rail and Road)
- Transport Act 2000
- Railways and Transport Safety Act 2003
- Railways Act 2005

== Industry bodies ==
=== Statutory authorities ===
- Office of Rail and Road
- Department for Transport
- UK Notified Bodies
- British Transport Police

==== Devolved authorities ====
- Transport Scotland
- Transport for Wales

=== Network and signalling operations ===
- Railtrack (1996–2002)
- Network Rail (2002–) – (A "not for dividend" company limited by guarantee)

=== Other national entities ===
- Institution of Railway Operators
- Rail Delivery Group
- Rail Freight Group
- Rail Passengers Council and Committees
- Rail Safety and Standards Board
- Rail Forum Midlands
- Railway Industry Association
- Railway Mission
- Railway Study Association

==== Trade unions ====
The railways are one of the most heavily unionised industrial sectors in the UK.

- Associated Society of Locomotive Engineers and Firemen (ASLEF)
- National Union of Rail, Maritime and Transport Workers (RMT)
- Transport Salaried Staffs' Association (TSSA)

=== Regional entities ===
See Passenger transport executive

- Transport for West Midlands
- TfGM (Transport for Greater Manchester)
- Merseytravel
- Metro (West Yorkshire Metro)
- Nexus (Tyne and Wear Passenger Transport Executive)
- Travel South Yorkshire (South Yorkshire Passenger Transport Executive)
- SPT (Strathclyde Partnership for Transport)
- TfL (Transport for London)

See List of companies operating trains in the United Kingdom.

=== Freight companies ===
- GB Railfreight
- DB Cargo UK
- Freightliner
- Direct Rail Services
- Colas Rail
- Devon and Cornwall Railways
- Mendip Rail

=== Open access and other non-franchised passenger operators ===
- Eurostar
- Grand Central
- Heathrow Express
- Hull Trains
- Venice-Simplon Orient Express (VSOE)
- Lumo (train operating company)

== 1820s–1840s: Early companies ==
This is only the earliest of the main line openings: for a more comprehensive list of the hundreds of early railways see List of early British railway companies

- Stockton and Darlington Railway (1825) – First steam-hauled passenger railway in the world.
- Canterbury and Whitstable Railway (1830) – First steam-hauled passenger railway to issue season tickets.
- Liverpool and Manchester Railway (1830) – First InterCity passenger railway.
- Grand Junction Railway (1833) – The line built by the company was the first trunk railway to be completed in England, and arguably the world's first long-distance railway with steam traction.
- London and Greenwich Railway (1836) – First steam railway in the capital, the first to be built specifically for passengers, and the first elevated railway.
- London and Birmingham Railway (1837) – First Intercity line to be built into London.
- Midland Counties Railway (1839)
- Birmingham and Derby Junction Railway (BDJR) (1839)
- North Midland Railway (1840)
- Taff Vale Railway (1840)

== Heritage and private ==
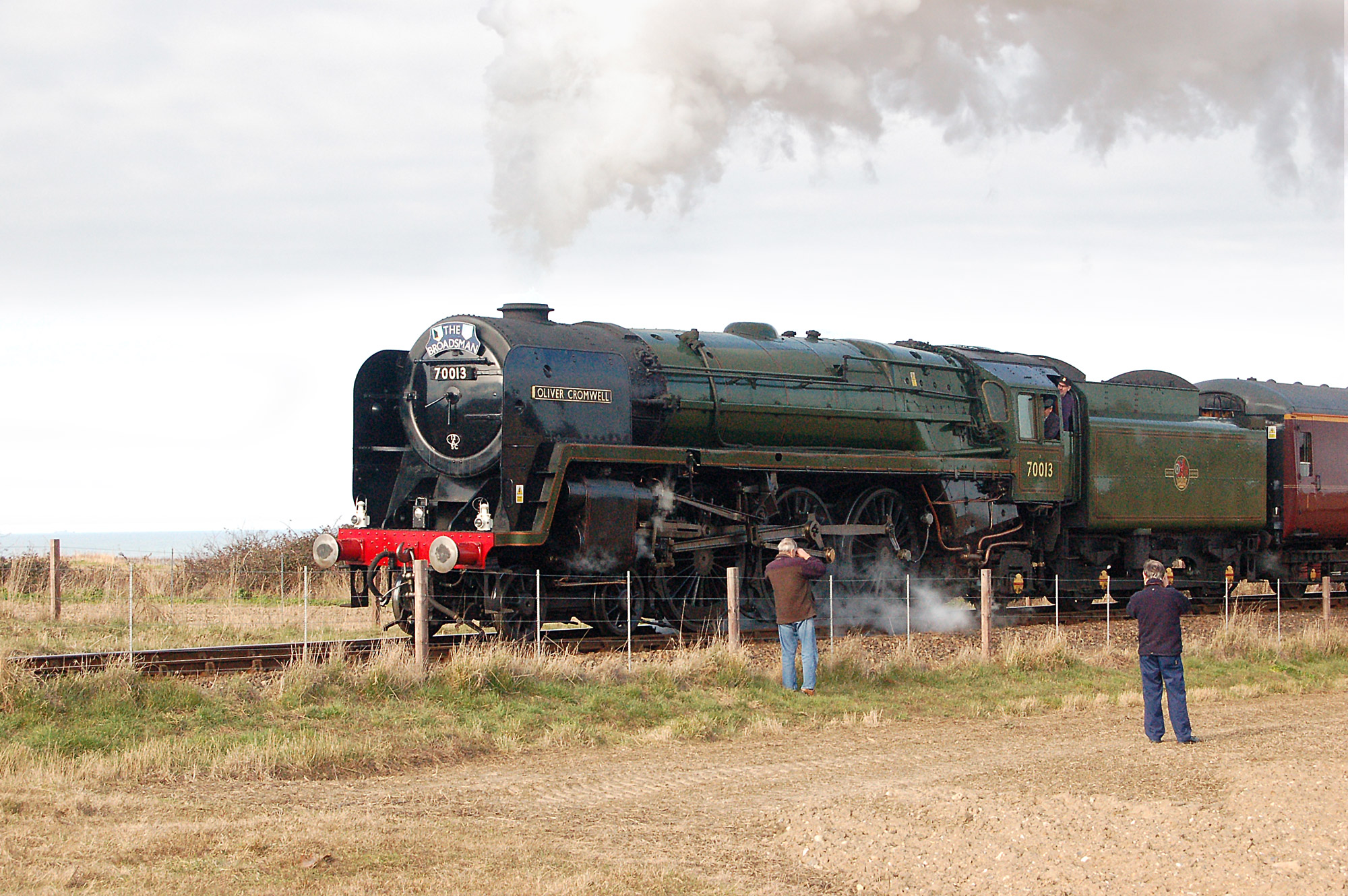
Heritage railways are popular tourist attractions. The photo shows a preserved locomotive (BR Standard 7MT 70013 Oliver Cromwell) on the North Norfolk Railway on 11 March 2010.

Many lines closed by British Railways, including many closed during the Beeching cuts, have been restored and reopened as heritage railways. A few have been relaid as narrow-gauge but the majority are standard-gauge. Most use both steam and diesel locomotives for haulage. Most heritage railways are operated as tourist attractions and do not provide regular year-round train services.

== Proposed line re-openings ==
Several pressure groups are campaigning for the re-opening of closed railway lines in Great Britain. These include:

- Marlow Branch (Bourne End–High Wycombe)
- Cambridge–Oxford, East West Rail This project was approved by the Government in November 2011.
- Carmarthen-Aberystwyth line
- Colne–Skipton, Skipton-East Lancashire Rail Action Partnership
- Great Central Railway Notts–Leicester
- Lynn and Hunstanton Railway
- Peak Rail: (Matlock–Bakewell). Under-funded line
- Portishead Railway from Portishead to Bristol Temple Meads
- South Staffordshire Line (Stourbridge–Walsall-Lichfield)
- St Andrews Rail Link (Leuchars–St Andrews)
- Wealden Line (Uckfield–Lewes)
- Woodhead Line (Hadfield–Penistone)
- York to Beverley Line (York–Beverley)

From 1995 until 2009, 27 new lines (totalling 199 track miles) and 68 stations were opened, with 65 further new station sites identified by Network Rail or government for possible construction. On 15 June 2009 the Association of Train Operating Companies (ATOC) published the report Connecting Communities: Expanding Access to the Rail Network, detailing schemes around England where it believed there was a commercial business case for passenger network expansion. The published proposals involved the re-opening or new construction of 40 stations, serving communities with populations of over 15,000, including 14 schemes involving the re-opening or reconstruction of rail lines for passenger services. These would be short-lead-time local projects, to be completed in timescales ranging from 2 years 9 months to 6 years, once approved by local and regional governments, Network Rail and the Department for Transport, complementing existing long-term national projects.

=== Most populous towns without rail services ===
This is a list of towns in England that do not have any sort of rail service. Services taken into account include National Rail, tram and metro services such as the Manchester Metrolink or the Tyne and Wear Metro. The first list is of separate towns. The second is of towns that form part of larger conurbations.

==== Built-up areas ====
Town	Population (2019 estimate)	Railway station closed	Notes
Rushden	41,387	1969	Proposals have been put forward for Rushden Parkway railway station on the Midland Main Line, to the west of the town.
Coalville	41,223	1964	Proposed for reopening on the Leicester–Burton upon Trent line.
Abingdon-on-Thames	40,074	1963	Radley railway station lies less than a mile outside the town's boundaries.
Canvey	38,849	N/A	Benfleet is sited nearby on the mainland.
Wisbech	35,681	1968	A 2009 report stated that it was feasible to reopen the Bramley Line to March railway station for £12 million, as the line was extant but unused. Since then, little had been done and the cost had risen to an estimated £70 million by 2019.
Bideford	30,783	1965	
Witney	30,518	1962	
Norton Radstock	30,319	1966	
Consett	30,023	1967	
Clay Cross/North Wingfield	29,975	1967	
Burntwood	29,525	1965	The town is served by the Chasewater Railway which is a heritage railway.
Haverhill	27,481	1967	
Portishead	26,535	1964	Portishead station expected to reopen in 2027 as the terminus of the reinstated Portishead Railway.
Daventry	25,781	1958	The nearest station at present is Long Buckby on the Northampton Loop. Proposals have been made to reopen Weedon railway station as a new Daventry Parkway station. Both stations are about the same distance (about 4.5 mi (7.2 km)) from central Daventry.
Stubbington	25,239	N/A	Lies within the Borough of Fareham and is 2 miles from Fareham railway station.
Stanley, County Durham	22,553	1955	The previous station was West Stanley railway station.
Maldon	22,032	1964	
Clevedon	21,138	1966	
Bordon	20,789	1957	
Dereham	21,362	1969	The town is served by a station on the Mid-Norfolk Railway, which is a heritage railway.
Stourport-on-Severn	21,096	1970	
Dinnington	20,443	1929	Previous station was Dinnington and Laughton railway station which is on a line still used for freight.
Hythe	20,402	1966	The previous station was on a line in use until 2016.

==== Built-up area subdivisions ====
Town	Population (2011 census)	Railway station closed	Urban area	Notes
Dudley	79,379	1964	West Midlands Conurbation	The town is served by Dudley Port station, just over a mile from the town centre but outside the borough boundary. Work began in January 2020 on a £449 million 6.8-mile (10.9 km) extension of the West Midlands Metro tram system from Wednesbury to Dudley, on the formation of the old South Staffordshire line.
Gosport	81,529	1953	South Hampshire	While Gosport does not have a railway station, Portsmouth Harbour station is a short pedestrian ferry ride away.
Newcastle-under-Lyme	75,082	1964	Stoke-on-Trent Built-up Area	Newcastle-under-Lyme lies 45 minutes on foot from Stoke-on-Trent railway station.
Washington	67,085	1964	Wearside	The town previously had a station on what is now the mothballed Leamside line. It has been the subject of many reopening proposals, including a potential extension of the Tyne and Wear Metro system.
Waterlooville	64,350	N/A	South Hampshire	Lies within the Borough of Havant which has four stations.
Halesowen	58,135	1958	West Midlands conurbation	A 40-minute walk from Old Hill railway station.
Leigh	52,855	1969	Greater Manchester Built-up Area	Lies on the Leigh-Salford-Manchester Bus Rapid Transit guided busway that links Leigh, Salford and Manchester City centre.
Swadlincote	45,000	1947	Burton upon Trent Built-up area	A reopening of the Leicester–Burton upon Trent line would see a station at Gresley, south of the town.
Kingswood	40,734	N/A	Bristol Built-up Area	
Skelmersdale	38,813	1963	Wigan Urban Area	Skelmersdale was designated as a 'new town' in 1961, with a focus on people owning cars. However, a proposal was considered by the Lancashire County Council. The Department for Transport announced in July 2022 that it was rejecting the Strategic Outline Business Case, throwing the scheme into doubt.
Dunstable	30,184	1965	Luton/Dunstable Urban Area	Lies on a guided busway that links to the town to stations in Luton.
Aldridge	26,988	1965	West Midlands Conurbation	The station at Aldridge has been proposed for reopening by 2040. It is on a freight/diversionary line between Walsall and Water Orton railway stations.
Ferndown	26,559	1974	South East Dorset Conurbation	The previous nearest station was West Moors. Ferndown is located approximately 7 miles from Bournemouth station and has a half-hourly bus service connecting the town with the station.
Woodley	25,932	N/A	Reading/Wokingham Urban Area	Earley station is on the southern boundary of the parish, but separated from Woodley by the A3290 dual carriageway. Woodley is within the Borough of Wokingham, which has six stations including the aforementioned Earley.
Rawtenstall, Lancashire	23,128	1972	Accrington/Rossendale Built-up area	The town has a station on the East Lancashire Railway served by a heritage railway.

== Links with adjacent countries ==
Comparison of British track gauges

- Great Britain (1,435 mm (4 ft 8 1/2 in) in standard gauge)
  - France (Eurostar) via the Channel Tunnel
    formerly by Train ferries.
  - Belgium (Eurostar) via France using the Channel Tunnel.
  - Netherlands (Eurostar) via France and Belgium using the Channel Tunnel.

=== Rail-ferry-rail services ===
There are no train ferries in operation, but some rail services are integrated with ferries:

- Netherlands – Dutchflyer rail/sea/rail service
- Ireland – SailRail service via Holyhead, Cairnryan or Fishguard

== See also ==
- Campaign to Bring Back British Rail
- Campaign to Electrify Britain's Railways
- Concessionary fares on the British railway network
- Financing of the rail industry in Great Britain
- Irish Sea tunnel
- List of funicular railways
- London Post Office Railway
- Mainline steam trains in Great Britain
- National Railway Museum
- Rail transport by country
- Royal Train
- Train categories in Europe
- Transport in the United Kingdom
- UK Ultraspeed
