= GCS =

GCS may refer to:

== Cartography ==
- Galactic coordinate system
- Geographic coordinate system

== Computing ==
- Game creation system
- Gauss Centre for Supercomputing, in Germany
- Google Cloud Storage
- Group communication system
- Group Control System, an IBM VM Operating system component

== Education ==
- Gadsden County School District, in Florida, United States
- Gallantry Cross, Silver, an honour of the Republic of Venda
- German Church School, in Addis Ababa, Ethiopia
- Glenelg Country School, in Ellicott City, Maryland, United States
- Gorey Community School, in County Wexford, Ireland
- Government College of Science, Lahore, Pakistan
- Grace Christian School (Florida), in Valrico, Florida, United States
- Grace Church School, in New York City
- Granville County Schools, in North Carolina, United States
- Greenfield Community School, in Dubai
- Greenville Christian School, in Mississippi, United States
- Greenwood College School, in Toronto, Ontario, Canada
- Guildford County School, in England

== Medicine ==
- Gamma-glutamylcysteine synthetase
- Gender confirming surgery
- Glasgow Coma Scale
- Glucocorticosteroids
- Glycine cleavage system

== Other uses ==
- General Campaign Star (Canada), a Canadian Forces medal
- Grand Central Station, in New York City
- Satellite ground control station
- UAV ground control station
- Global Civic Sharing, a South Korean charity
- Global Combat Ship, of the Royal Navy
- Gold Coast Suns, an Australian Football League team
- Green Cove Springs, Florida

== See also ==
- GC (disambiguation)
