= Alliance Rail Holdings =

Railway operating company in the United Kingdom

- Formation: 2009
- Dissolved: 14 February 2023
- Headquarters: York
- Acting Managing Director: Richard McClean
- Parent organization: Arriva UK Trains
- Staff: 5

Alliance Rail Holdings was a railway company developing plans to operate passenger trains in the United Kingdom through its subsidiaries Great North Western Railway Company Limited (GNWR) and Grand Southern Railway (GSR). Despite various proposals, the company did not run any passenger services.

Alliance had undertaken detailed timetabling and economic work to support its applications to the Office of Rail & Road (ORR). Alliance was headed by Richard McClean who is also managing director of Grand Central. A new development team was announced on 12 August 2010. The venture was wholly owned by Arriva. On 23 February 2023, the company was legally dissolved.

== Approved proposals ==
=== Great North Western Railway ===
Great North Western Railway (GNWR) was planned to become an open-access train operating company. GNWR was granted permission by the Office of Rail & Road to operate up to five return services per day between London Euston and Blackpool North, via the West Coast Main Line, to commence in September 2019. However, in June 2019, it was revealed the services would be operated by sister company Grand Central from spring 2020 instead of September 2019.

In 2010, GNWR lodged an application to operate services from London Euston to Bradford Interchange, Whitehaven, Windermere, Southport and Morecambe. However, these were rejected in 2011 by the ORR. An amended application was lodged in 2011.

In June 2014, GNWR successfully concluded negotiations with Network Rail for access paths from London Euston to Blackpool, Huddersfield and Leeds from 2017 using Pendolino trains. However, in January 2015 and despite Network Rail support, the ORR refused these proposed GNWR services citing capacity issues and failing the not primarily abstractive test, meaning most of its revenue would be at the expense of existing users rather than new custom. In 2010, it was proposed that services be operated by dual-mode (diesel + electric) Polaris trains, capable of 140 mph (230 km/h). Sixteen trainsets were expected to be ordered, with a capacity of up to 350 passengers each. However, the Polaris deal was not finalised and Alliance indicated that it was investigating purchasing Pendolinos from Alstom.

In August 2015, the ORR announced Alliance Rail's amended application to operate six trains per day from London Euston to Blackpool calling at Milton Keynes, Nuneaton, Tamworth, Lichfield Trent Valley, Crewe, Preston, Kirkham & Wesham and Poulton-le-Fylde had been successful. A 10-year access agreement was awarded with operations to commence in May 2018. These services were to have been operated by fellow Arriva subsidiary Grand Central. The application proposed using 125 mph tilting Class 390 Pendolinos, however with Alliance unable to negotiate a derogation to operate the rolling stock, the access rights lapsed in June 2017.

Alliance applied for altered paths with InterCity 225 sets to commence operating from September 2019. As these are not able to tilt, their speed would be restricted to 110 mph. Due to the lower speed, the revised service would only call at Milton Keynes, Nuneaton, Preston, Kirkham & Wesham and Poulton-le-Fylde.

In June 2018, the Office of Rail and Road approved the new application for a 7-year track access application for 5 direct services from Blackpool North to London Euston, calling at Poulton-le-Fylde, Kirkham and Wesham, Preston, Nuneaton and Milton Keynes Central from September 2019. An option for a 6th service in the future was available.

Until cancelled amid the COVID-19 pandemic, Grand Central (rather than Great North Western Railway) planned to operate five daily return services between London Euston and Blackpool North via the West Coast Main Line, calling at Milton Keynes Central, Nuneaton, Preston, Kirkham and Wesham and Poulton-le-Fylde.

== Rejected proposals ==
=== Grand Southern Railway ===
In November 2016, Alliance began consultation on a proposed London Waterloo to Southampton service. It was proposed to operate seven off-peak services per day from December 2017, calling at Wimbledon, Hook, Basingstoke, Winchester, Eastleigh and Southampton Airport Parkway, with two peak services proposed from December 2018. It was set to use Class 442 trains. Network Rail had identified available paths for Grand Southern to use. In March 2017, the Office of Rail and Road (ORR) told Grand Southern to delay the application until the outcome of the South Western franchise was known. In March 2018, the ORR released an update confirming a delay to the application. The application was eventually rejected in August 2018.

The reason for the rejection was that the Class 442s were no longer available. The proposal also generated only between £0.17 and £0.22 of new revenue for each pound abstracted from the incumbent operators, and the ORR requires it to be over £0.30, so it failed the "not primarily abstractive" test.

=== Great North Eastern Railway ===
Great North Eastern Railway

GNER, resurrecting the name of the defunct Sea Containers subsidiary lodged an application to operate from London King's Cross to Cleethorpes, Bradford Forster Square, Ilkley and Edinburgh from 2018. These were rejected in May 2016.

It also proposed in 2009 to operate services from London King's Cross to Scarborough via the Yorkshire Coast Line, Skegness, Sheffield via Grantham, Grimsby and Middlesbrough, but these were rejected in 2010 by the ORR. It was also proposed in December 2013 that services would run services between Kings Cross and Skipton, but these were withdrawn in 2014 by the ORR.
