= CG =

CG, Cg or cg may refer to:

== Arts and entertainment ==
- Chaotic Good, an alignment in the role-playing game Dungeons & Dragons
- Classical guitar, a type of guitar

== Businesses and organizations ==
=== Businesses ===
- Central of Georgia Railway, between Macon and Savannah, Georgia in the US
- Chappe et Gessalin, a French automobile maker
- Chaudhary Group, a multinational company based in Nepal
- Cigna, formed in Hartford in 1865 as the Connecticut General Life Insurance Company
- Colorado General Hospital, now known as University of Colorado Hospital
- PNG Air, an airline from Papua New Guinea (IATA code CG)
- The Carlyle Group, a private equity firm (stock symbol CG)

=== Military units ===
- Ceremonial Guard, an ad hoc military unit in the Canadian Forces
- Coast guard, a national organization responsible for various services at sea
- US Navy hull designation for guided-missile cruisers

=== Political parties ===
- Galician Coalition, a Galician political party with a Galician nationalist and centrist ideology
- Galician Convergence, a Galician political party with a moderate nationalist ideology, which describes itself as centrist, socially progressive and economically liberal

=== Other organizations ===
- Common Ground (NYC), a non-profit that builds and runs supportive housing in New York City and elsewhere
- Community Games, an Irish voluntary organisation for young people to experience sporting and cultural activities
- City Games of China, former name for the China National Youth Games

== Mathematics, science, and technology ==
=== Mathematics and computing ===
- Cg (programming language), developed by NVIDIA
- Categorial grammar, a term used for a family of formalisms in natural language syntax
- Character generator, a device or software that produces static or animated text (such as crawls and rolls) for keying into a video stream for broadcast television
- Computational geometry, the study of algorithms to solve problems stated in terms of geometry
- Computer graphics, graphics created using computers and, more generally, the representation and manipulation of image data by a computer with help from specialized software and hardware
  - Computer-generated imagery, application of computer graphics to create or contribute to images in art
- Conceptual graph, a formalism for knowledge representation
- Conjugate gradient method, an algorithm for the numerical solution of particular systems of linear equations
- Constraint Grammar, a methodological paradigm for natural language processing
- Coherency Granule, usually the size of a CPU cache line
- Clock gating, a way to lower clock tree power in an integrated circuit

=== Other uses in science and technology ===
- Centigram (cg), a unit of mass in the SI system
- Center of gravity, a point in a body that may be used to simplify description of gravitational interactions
- Cloud-to-ground lightning, a type of lightning
- Carbon group, also called group 14
- Chorionic gonadotropin, a hormone produced by the placenta during pregnancy
- A US Navy hull classification symbol: Guided-missile cruiser (CG)
- Phosgene (military designation CG), a chemical weapon used during World War I

== Places ==
- Chhattisgarh, a state of India
- Crna Gora, the native name of Montenegro
- Democratic Republic of the Congo (FIPS Pub 10-4 and obsolete NATO digram)
- Republic of the Congo (ISO country code), a state in Central Africa
  - .cg, the Internet country code top-level domain (ccTLD) for the Republic of the Congo
- Cypress Gardens, an American theme park near Winter Haven, Florida, that operated from 1936 to 2009

== Ranks and titles ==
- Certified Genealogist, licensed by the Board for Certification of Genealogists
- Commandant-General, a rank in several counties and is generally equivalent to that of Commandant
- Commanding General, a commanding officer in the military that holds a general officer rank

== Other uses ==
- Complete game, in baseball, the act of a pitcher pitching an entire game without the benefit of a relief pitcher
- Corporate Governance, a system of law and approaches by which corporations are directed and controlled
- Changi Airport MRT Line, a part of East West MRT Line in Singapore
- Caribbean guilder, a currency that has Cg as its symbol
