= Fraser Eagle =

British bus operating company

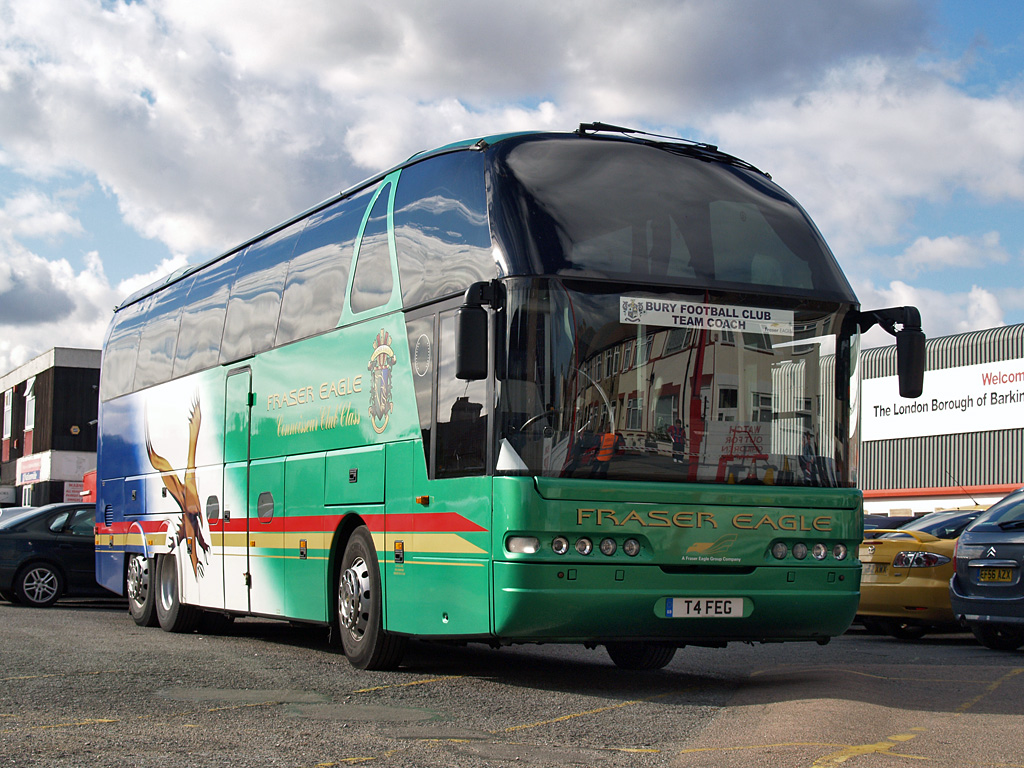
- Neoplan in October 2008
- Founded: 1919
- Ceased operation: 2009
- Headquarters: Padiham
- Service type: Coach charter operator
- Chief executive: Kevin Dean
- Website: www.frasereagle.com (Archived)

Fraser Eagle was a group of companies in the United Kingdom specialising in passenger transport, travel and logistics. Services included pre-planned and emergency coach and taxi services nationwide, corporate travel, event transport, incident management transport and destination management services. These services were provided mainly to the corporate sector.

It provided coach tours and independent travel agency services to the consumer sector. The company was placed in administration in March 2009.

== History ==
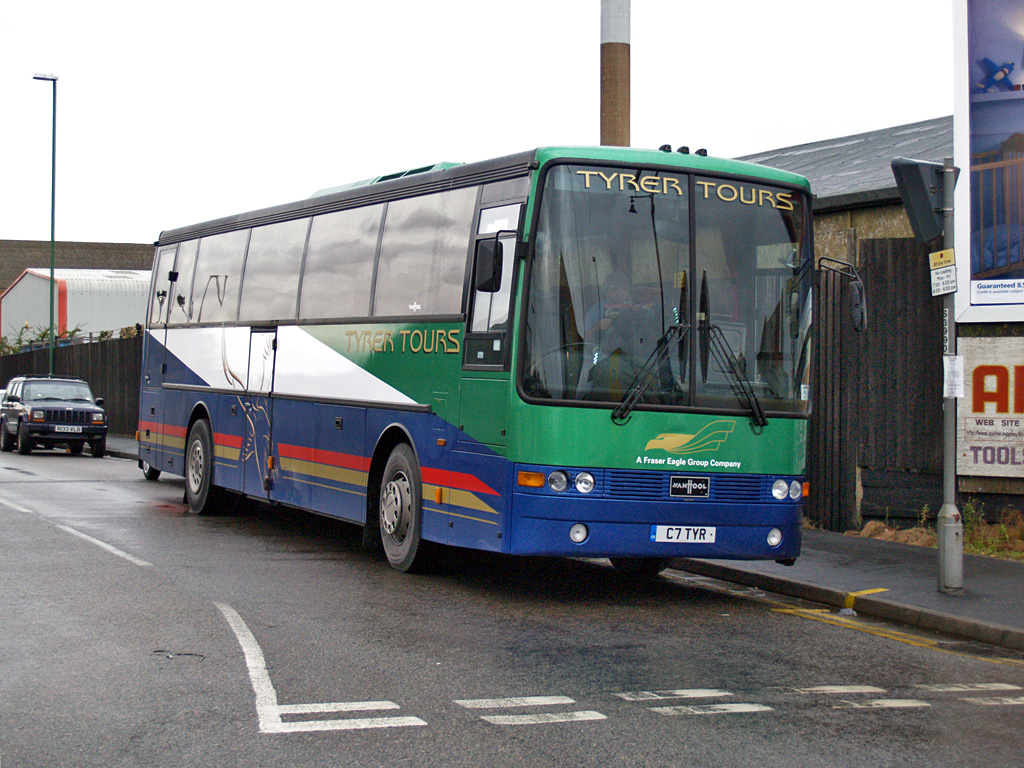
Van Hool bodied DAF in November 2008

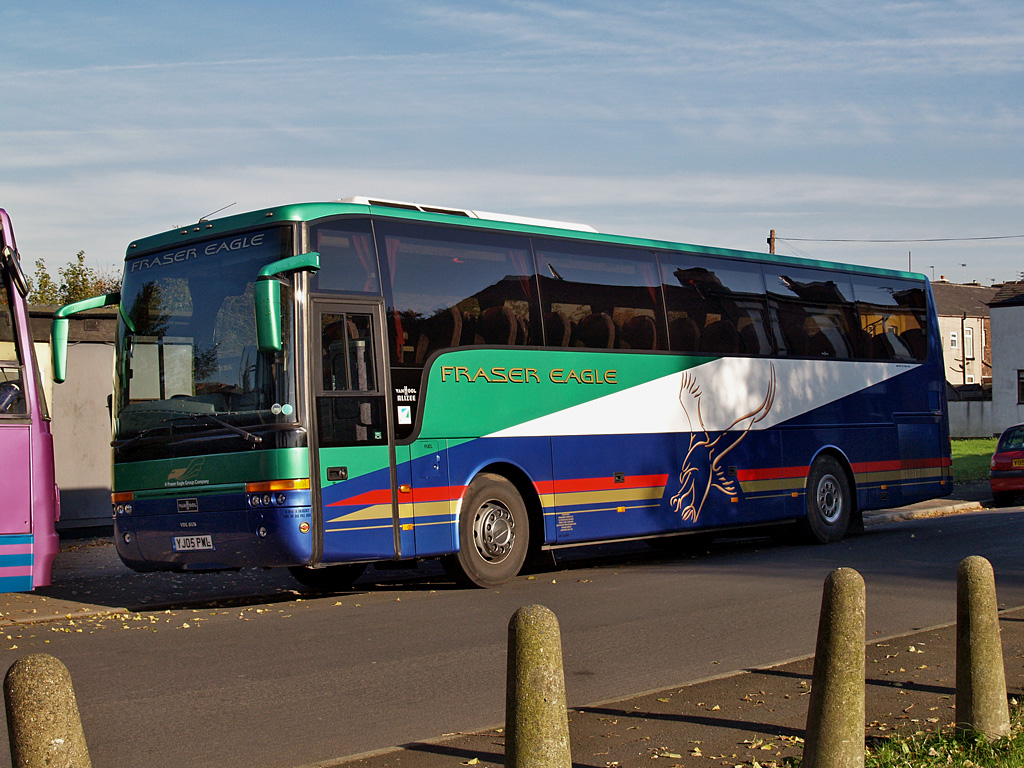
Van Hool bodied VDL SB4000 in November 2006

The company started out as an Accrington based coach company in 1919, transporting holidaymakers to the coastal resorts in England and Scotland. The company was formed by Harold Williams and Ward Knowles, and they later expanded to include tours and excursions across Europe.

The company expanded rapidly in the 1990s, when it began providing coaches to the rail industry when train services were disrupted, quickly becoming the United Kingdom's leading provider of rail replacement services, a business which exploded in the wake of the disruption following the Hatfield rail crash, and the long running modernisation of the West Coast Main Line.

It also managed, planned, and provided replacement coaches in non emergency situations (railway engineering works etc.), acting as a transport broker with a database of 5,000 coach and taxi suppliers nationwide. Among others, Fraser Eagle provided replacement transport for Virgin Trains West Coast, winning a £12m three-year contract to provide Virgin with around 100,000 taxis a year.

Concern had been expressed from both suppliers and clients about the future commercial viability of Fraser Eagle, particularly in February 2009 when it announced 50 of their 170 staff were being laid off, the closure of Fraser Eagle Cars division and that they would be ending their sponsorship of Accrington Stanley earlier than contracted.

Although claiming this was a result of the financial downturn and increased competition, it seems apparent the story runs deeper with allegations of insolvent trading for several months and many of Fraser Eagle's regular suppliers refusing to take any work on until arrears had been settled, some of which date back to Summer 2008.

These concerns were realised when the company filed for administration on 10 March 2009.

== Grand Central ==
In 2004, Fraser Eagle purchased a 79% shareholding in Grand Central. This was sold in March 2007 to two former managers of Prism Rail, backed by a private equity group.

== Other businesses ==
The group also managed Fraser Eagle Worldchoice Travel Agent, and Fraser Eagle Cars. They were based in Padiham, Lancashire, employing 180 full-time staff. They also had offices in Malta. Fraser Eagle Cars was established in December 2006.
