= Green Council =

Hong Kong environmental organization

Green Council 環保促進會
- Formation: Hong Kong (2000)
- Type: Non-governmental organization
- Location: Rm 703, New World Tower 1, 18 Queen's Road Central, Hong Kong
- Chairperson: [Mr. Conrad CHENG Chi-him]
- Website: www.greencouncil.org

The Green Council (GC) is a Hong Kong non-profit, non-partisan, tax-exempt charitable (Ref. No.: 91/6063) environmental stewardship organisation and certification body (Reg. No.: HKCAS-027) of Hong Kong established in 2000. A group of individuals from different sectors of industry and academics shared the vision to help build Hong Kong into a world-class green city for the future. They formed the Green Council with the aim of encouraging the industrial and commercial sectors to include environmental protection in their management and production processes.

== History ==
The Green Council, a non-profit environmental protection organisation, was founded in 2000. Volunteers in the fields of academia, commerce, and industry largely were the association's creators. It was established to push for the adoption of environmental considerations in companies' operations and manufacturing. It created the Hong Kong Green Label Scheme in (HKGLS) in 2000 to certify products as being environmentally friendly. The organisation established the Hong Kong Green Awards (Chinese: 香港綠色企業大獎) in 2010 to recognise companies that had exemplary environmental practices. The organisation hosted environmental education and advocacy events such as the Green Carnival (Chinese: 環保嘉年華), the Creative Model Design Tournament (Chinese: 環保創意模型設計比賽), the International Coastal Cleanup Campaign (Chinese: 國際海岸清潔運動), Hong Kong Green Day (Chinese: 香港綠色日), and Green Run (Chinese: 著綠狂奔).

== Green Label Scheme ==
The Hong Kong Green Label Scheme (HKGLS) is an independent and voluntary scheme for the certification of environmentally preferable products launched in 2000 by the Green Council. The scheme sets environmental Product Criteria and awards its "Green Label" to products that are qualified regarding their environment attributes and/or performance, and the aim is to encourage manufacturers to supply products with good environmental performance and provide a convenient means for consumers to recognise products that are more environmentally responsible, thus promoting a more sustainable pattern of consumption.
