= Gc (engineering) =

Unit conversion factor in physics

In engineering and physics, g_{c} is a unit conversion factor used to convert mass to force or vice versa. It is defined as

$$g_\text{c} = \frac{ma}{F}$$

In unit systems where force is a derived unit, like in SI units, g_{c} is equal to 1. In unit systems where force is a primary unit, like in imperial and US customary measurement systems, g_{c} may or may not equal 1 depending on the units used, and value other than 1 may be required to obtain correct results. For example, in the kinetic energy (KE) formula, if g_{c} = 1 is used, then KE is expressed in foot-poundals; but if g_{c} = 32.174 is used, then KE is expressed in foot-pounds.

== Motivations ==
According to Newton's second law, the force F is proportional to the product of mass m and acceleration a:

$$F \propto ma$$

or

$$F = K ma$$

If F = 1 lbf, m = 1 lb, and a = 32.174 ft/s^{2}, then

$$1~\text{lbf} = K \cdot 1~\text{lb} \cdot 32.174~\frac{\text{ft}}{\text{s}^2}$$

Leading to

$$K = \frac{1~\text{lbf}}{1~\text{lb} \cdot 32.174~\frac{\text{ft}}{\text{s}^2}} = 0.03108~\frac{\text{lbf} \cdot \text{s}^2}{\text{lb} \cdot \text{ft}}$$

g_{c} is defined as the reciprocal of the constant K

$$g_\text{c} = \frac{1}{K} = 32.174~\frac{\text{lb} \cdot\text{ft}}{\text{lbf} \cdot \text{s}^2}$$

or equivalently, as

$$g_\text{c} = \frac{ma}{F}$$

== Specific systems of units ==
International System	English System 1	English System 2
g_{c} = 1 (kg·m)/(N·s^{2})	g_{c} = 32.174 (lb·ft)/(lbf·s^{2})	g_{c} = 1 (slug·ft)/(lbf·s^{2})
