= Global Civic Sharing =

Global Civic Sharing (GCS) is a non-profit organization providing development aid to needy communities in different countries. It was established in 1998 and based in South Korea.

It works in Vietnam, East Timor, Mongolia, Rwanda, Ethiopia, Myanmar, Kenya and declares its objectives to carry out development assistance projects, support civil society empowerment, provide emergency relief assistance and support the victims of natural disasters and conflicts, implement public relations and education programs, promote participation of young Koreans in voluntary activities, implement researches and campaigns for policy-making, encourage participation in the global exchange movement.

The Organization set up a Viet-Korea Cooperation Centre in Hà Tây Province of Vietnam and annually spend about 103,000 USD in that country. It also funds Model Livestock Farming Community Building Project in Mongolia and so on.
