= Sovereign Trains =

Sovereign Trains was a rolling stock company (ROSCO) formed in England in 2007, as part of the same group as Grand Central. The company was formed to fund the purchase of rolling stock for Grand Central for its operations between London King's Cross and Sunderland, which Grand Central leased from Sovereign. This amounted to six Class 43 power cars and 24 Mark 3 coaches to form three complete trains. However, in 2007, Sovereign entered into a partnership with Chinese manufacturer CSR Ziyang to market their new range of trains in Europe, with Grand Central committing to operate the Polaris DEMU, should its track-access agreement be extended.

In 2010, Sovereign Trains sold its three HST sets to Angel Trains, which then leased the sets back to Grand Central.
