= German Church School =

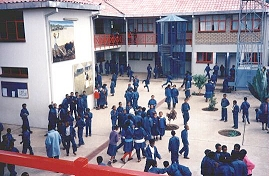
Schoolyard of the German Church School, Addis Ababa

The German Church School (GCS) is a social project of the Protestant German Speaking Congregation in the Ethiopian capital of Addis Ababa. Their origins go back to the year 1966.

The school is the first, and up to now only, integrative educational program in Ethiopia, in which blind and seeing children are taught jointly.

A few relief organizations support the project. In the main the school is carried financially through the Protestant German Speaking Congregation in Ethiopia and private donors in Europe and the United States.

The instruction at the school is reserved exclusively for Ethiopian children of the poorest families from that the slum areas in the vicinity of the Church grounds. The staff of the school are completely Ethiopian men and women.

In the year 2004, the school was visited by the German federal chancellor Gerhard Schröder and Eva Köhler, the wife of the former German president Horst Köhler, who praised the German Church School and the decades of work of the Protestant German Speaking Congregation in Ethiopia, which has membership in the Protestant Church in Germany (EKD).

The financing of the work of the school is covered through personal sponsorships (donations for support of specific children) and private fosterships (donations for specific projects) as well as various undesignated donations and subsidies from relief organizations.
