= Grand Central (train operating company) =

Open-access train operating company in the United Kingdom

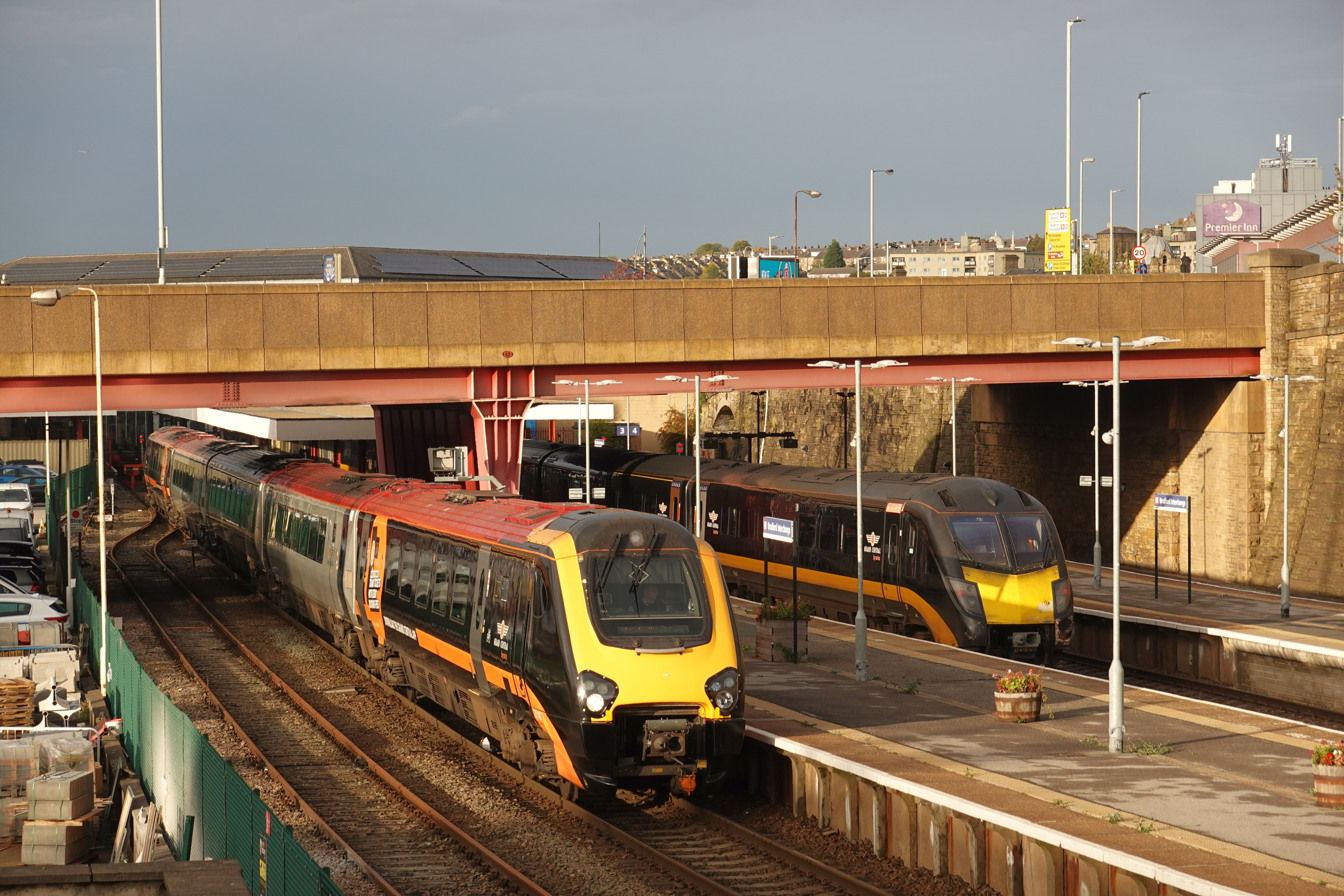
- Class 180 Adelante and Class 221 Super Voyager at Bradford Interchange

Overview
- Franchises: Open-access operator; Not subject to franchising; 18 December 2007 – 2038
- Main regions: Greater London; Yorkshire & the Humber; North East England
- Fleet: Class 180 Adelante; Class 221 Super Voyager
- Stations called at: 15
- Stations operated: 0
- Parent company: Arriva UK Trains
- Reporting mark: GC

Other
- Website: www.grandcentralrail.com
Route map

Grand Central is a British open-access operator in the United Kingdom. A subsidiary of Arriva UK Trains, it has operated passenger rail services since December 2007.

The company was founded in April 2000 as Grand Central Railway Company. Following multiple applications for track access rights, it launched its operations on the East Coast Main Line between Sunderland and London King's Cross in December 2007. Services between Bradford Interchange and London King's Cross commenced in May 2010. In November 2011, Grand Central was acquired by Arriva UK Trains.

Grand Central has also put forward various proposals for operating additional services in the future. One such service, from London Euston to Blackpool North via the West Coast Main Line, was scheduled to begin in 2021, but the initiative was cancelled as a result of the COVID-19 pandemic.

== History ==
The origins of Grand Central can be traced back to the privatisation of British Rail during the mid-1990s. Several bids were submitted under the Grand Central name by Ian Yeowart and a consortium of ex-British Rail managers to operate Midland Mainline and Regional Railways North East franchises. However, none of the bids it made resulted in a franchise being awarded. In light of this, during March 1998, the company was formally dissolved.

In April 2000, a new company, 'Grand Central Railway Company', was founded to pursue open-access opportunities. One year later, it was publicly proposing to obtain second hand Intercity 125 sets with which to run its own services.

During June 2003, Grand Central applied to the Office of the Rail Regulator (ORR) to operate a two-hourly open-access service from Newcastle to Bolton via the Caldervale Line and Manchester Victoria using InterCity 125 trains from Virgin CrossCountry. In June 2004, this track-access application was rejected.

While establishing its operations, Grand Central reached out to the coach operator Fraser Eagle Group for assistance; during March 2006, Fraser Eagle opted to acquire a 79% shareholding in the venture. In response to the acquisition, Great North Eastern Railway (GNER) threatened to sever business ties with Fraser Eagle Group, with which it had active contracts to provide rail replacement buses.

In February 2005, Grand Central applied to the ORR to operate four daily services from Sunderland to London King's Cross and four daily services from Bradford Interchange to London King's Cross using Class 67 locomotives hauling five Mark 3 carriages and a Driving Van Trailer. In March 2006, the ORR granted Grand Central access rights for three daily Sunderland to London King's Cross services. After unsuccessfully attempting to have the process reversed at an ORR hearing, the franchised operator GNER sought a judicial review of the decision to grant Grand Central access rights, but this was rejected by the High Court in July 2006.

During March 2007, it was announced that Fraser Eagle had sold its 79% shareholding in Grand Central for £10 million to a pair of former managers of Prism Rail, who were backed by a private equity group.

Operations were originally due to start in May 2007, however, delays in the procurement and refurbishment of rolling stock were reportedly encountered.

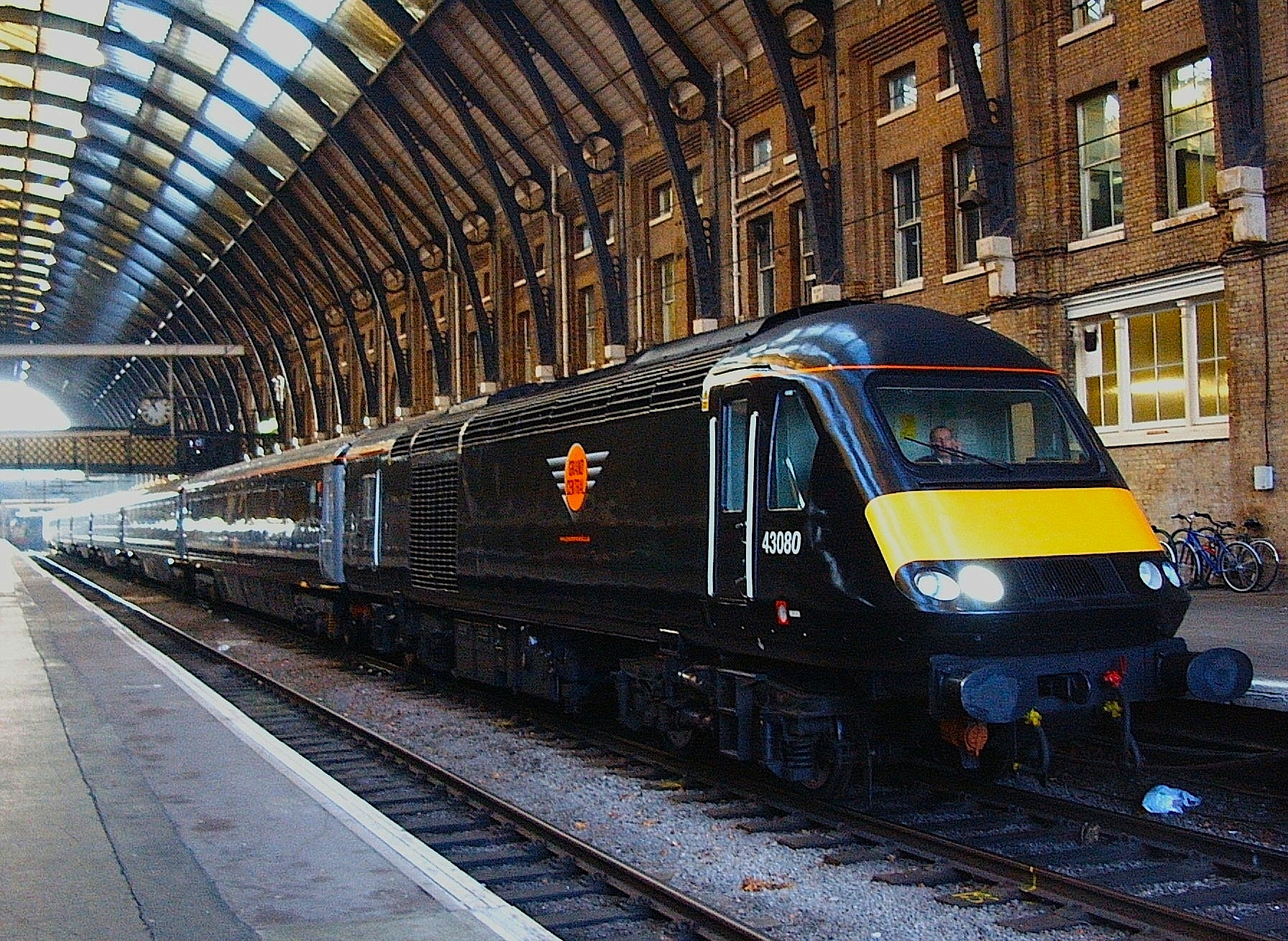
Class 43 HST at London King's Cross on 18 December 2007, the first day of Grand Central services

On 18 December 2007, operations commenced between Sunderland and London King's Cross. While awaiting delivery of all of the rolling stock, Grand Central initially operated only one Sunderland – King's Cross and one York – King's Cross service in each direction. During March 2008, the full timetable was introduced. Mechanical problems with the InterCity 125 fleet led to services being regularly cancelled, as well as a reduced service being operated between May and July 2008.

During March 2008, Grand Central applied to the ORR to operate three daily services from Bradford Interchange to London King's Cross. In January 2009, it was granted access rights for three daily Bradford Interchange to King's Cross services until December 2014 and a fourth Sunderland to London King's Cross service until May 2012. During August 2009, the fourth daily Sunderland–London service started.

In February 2010, the ORR announced that all access rights had been extended until December 2016.

On 23 May 2010, Grand Central services between Bradford Interchange and King's Cross began. It had been hoped that the service would start in December 2009, but difficulties in securing rolling stock caused delay.

In November 2011, Grand Central was bought out by Arriva UK Trains for an undisclosed amount. At the time of the takeover, Grand Central had 123 employees, a turnover of £18.9 million and debts of £44 million.

Since December 2011, Bradford services have made an additional stop at Mirfield. During December 2012, a fifth service was operated on the Sunderland to London route; however, on account of pathing difficulties, it initially started at Hartlepool. In December 2013, a fourth daily Bradford to London King's Cross service began.

In August 2014, Grand Central was granted an extension of its operating rights until December 2026.

A further extension of Grand Central's operating rights was granted by the ORR in March 2025, allowing for the continuation of their existing services until December 2038. In response to the certainty of their future as an operator, the company placed an order for nine Hitachi-built Class 820s to replace the ageing Class 180 fleet with the further option to order two more units should their proposed London to Cleethorpes service be approved alongside the planned additional services of two London-to-Bradford return journeys and an extra morning service from York to London.

=== COVID-19 pandemic ===
From 3 April 2020, Grand Central temporarily suspended all services due to the COVID-19 pandemic. A spokesperson for the company said "Grand Central has decided to suspend services and hibernate the company to protect their financial viability during this time of reduced passenger numbers." As Grand Central is not a franchised train operating company (TOC), it is not subject to the same government financial package as other franchised services. The company resumed operations on 26 July 2020, initially operating a limited service of five return journeys per day, to increase over subsequent months.

Following the second lockdown announced by the UK government, Grand Central announced on 3 November 2020 that it would once again suspend all services from 6 November. After the second lockdown ended, Grand Central resumed service on 3 December 2020 with a limited timetable and a reservation-only policy on all its services. After the third lockdown's announcement, Grand Central announced on 6 January 2021 that it would once again be suspending all services from 9 January to 1 March 2021.

== Routes and services ==
=== Current services ===
Grand Central connects Yorkshire and the North East to London with two routes.

Six daily services on the North East to London route operate between Sunderland and London King's Cross calling at Seaham, Hartlepool, Eaglescliffe, Northallerton, Thirsk and York. One train per day calls at Peterborough in both directions. Four trains per day call at Seaham in each direction. On Sundays, five trains operate in both directions. This route is known as the North Eastern service. Grand Central has in the past given names to two trains on this route. Contrary to tradition in British named train services, these were individual one-way trips rather than pairs. In the 2008 timetable, the name The Zephyr was given to the early morning (06:41) departure from Sunderland, while the evening (16:50) train from London was called The 21st Century Limited. As of the 2012 timetable, these names are no longer used by the company.

Four daily services which run on the Yorkshire to London route operate between Bradford Interchange and London King's Cross calling at Low Moor, Halifax, Brighouse, Mirfield, Wakefield Kirkgate, and Doncaster. Some services also call at Pontefract Monkhill and/or Peterborough. This is known as the West Riding (or West Yorkshire) service.

| Service | Route | tpd | Calling at |
|---|---|---|---|
| North Eastern | London King's Cross to Sunderland | 6 | Peterborough, York, Thirsk, Northallerton, Eaglescliffe, Hartlepool, Seaham; Five trains per day on Sundays.; Peterborough is served by one train in each direction, Monday to Saturday only.; Seaham is served by four trains in each direction. |
| West Riding | London King's Cross to Bradford Interchange | 4 | Peterborough, Doncaster, Pontefract Monkhill, Wakefield Kirkgate, Mirfield, Brighouse, Halifax, Low Moor; Low Moor, Halifax, Brighouse are served by three trains southbound and four trains northbound on Sundays.; Pontefract Monkhill is served by three trains southbound and two trains northbound on weekdays, four trains southbound and one train northbound on Saturdays, and no trains in either direction on Sundays.; Peterborough is served by one train in each direction, Monday to Saturday only. |

=== Proposed services ===
Grand Central has a number of open application for new services.

==== London King's Cross to Cleethorpes ====
In December 2017, Grand Central announced plans to bid for a service from London King's Cross to Cleethorpes in early 2018 for a date in 2020. It would involve the existing Bradford Interchange service extended to ten coaches from London to Doncaster then dividing with five coaches going to Cleethorpes via Scunthorpe, Barnetby, Habrough and Grimsby. The other five coaches would be the existing service to Bradford Interchange. This proposal would require permission for a split of trains as it has not been used on the East Coast Main Line before. In February 2018, Grand Central announced plans for an additional call at Crowle. The company planned to operate four trains per day from 2020. However, in July 2018, the Office of Rail and Road announced new access charges which would affect the business case for the new service, leading to Grand Central announcing that it would delay bidding until 2019.

==== Additional Bradford and Sunderland services ====
In March 2018, Grand Central announced that it had applied for six services from London to Sunderland, up from five now, and six services from London to Bradford Interchange, up from four now, which would use Adelante trains.

==== York to London King's Cross ====
In May 2018, Grand Central announced plans to add an additional evening service before 22:00 between York and London. This service would be ten carriages long.

==== Wakefield Kirkgate to London King's Cross ====
Grand Central applied for an additional early morning service and an evening service from London to Wakefield; it was rejected because it did not meet the economic criteria. However, in May 2018, Grand Central reapplied for the service. This would see one train per day in each direction between London King's Cross and Wakefield.

==== Newcastle to Brighton ====
Grand Central applied in April 2025 for a direct service between Newcastle and Brighton calling at Durham, Darlington, Northallerton, York, Doncaster, Sheffield, Derby, Burton-on-Trent, Birmingham New Street, Warwick Parkway, Banbury, Oxford, Reading, Wokingham, Guildford, Redhill, Gatwick Airport, and Haywards Heath.

==== Manchester Piccadilly to London St Pancras ====
Grand Central applied in June 2026 for a direct service between up to five daily services between Manchester Piccadilly and London St Pancras calling at Stockport, Macclesfield, Congleton, Stoke-on-Trent, Uttoxeter, Derby, Loughborough, Leicester, Wellingborough and Luton Airport Parkway.

The proposal responds to a number of gaps and issues in the current railway offering. GC said its proposed offer "addresses a clear gap in the network" by linking the North West and East Midlands. It also argues that serving Uttoxeter would enable direct rail access to the UK’s largest theme park, Alton Towers, from London and Manchester, and has the resort’s backing.

GC also argues that its application "seeks to make pragmatic use" of off-peak Midland Main Line (MML) capacity, a route it said is "materially less constrained".

The proposed service could start in May 2029.

=== Formerly proposed services ===
Grand Central also previously expressed interest in operating services between York and Chester, between Bradford and London, between Lincoln and London, and between Blackpool and London.

==== York to Chester ====
During February 2005, Grand Central lodged an application with the Office of Rail Regulation to operate a three times a day York to Chester via the Caldervale Line service with Class 158 units. This service would have called at Leeds, Wakefield Kirkgate, Brighouse, Rochdale, Manchester Victoria and Warrington Bank Quay.

==== Bradford Interchange to London Euston ====
In September 2006, Grand Central announced a proposal to run services from Bradford Interchange via Huddersfield and the West Coast Main Line to London Euston. This service would have called at Halifax, Brighouse, Huddersfield, Stalybridge, Guide Bridge, Stockport, Crewe, Lichfield Trent Valley, Tamworth and Nuneaton. The proposal was dropped due to Virgin Trains' Moderation of Competition protection preventing any other operators from operating on the West Coast Main Line.

==== Lincoln to London King's Cross ====
In June 2010, following East Coast deciding not to proceed with plans for a proposed two hourly service between Lincoln and London King's Cross, Grand Central expressed an interest in running services, but was rejected. This service would have called at Newark North Gate and Grantham.

==== Blackpool North to London Euston ====
In November 2010, Grand Central applied to the ORR to operate a new service running four times a day in each direction between Blackpool North and London Euston via the West Coast Main Line, calling at Poulton-le-Fylde, Kirkham & Wesham, Preston, Hartford, Tamworth and Nuneaton. Grand Central sought to run these services from May 2012, using Class 67 locomotives hauling nine Mark 3 carriages and a Driving Van Trailer running at up to 110 mph (177 km/h), until such time as the Blackpool North - Preston line was electrified. In March 2011, the Office of Rail Regulation rejected the application on the basis the service would be primarily abstractive, meaning it would generate most of its revenue by drawing custom away from existing operators rather than bringing new custom to the rail network.

Sister company Great North Western Railway originally re-applied for paths with former London North Eastern Railway InterCity 225 sets to begin a service between Blackpool North and London Euston from September 2019. As these are not able to tilt, their speed is restricted to 110 mph (180 km/h).

In June 2018, the ORR approved the new application for a seven-year track-access agreement for five direct services from Blackpool North to London Euston, calling at Poulton-le-Fylde, Kirkham and Wesham, Preston, Nuneaton and Milton Keynes Central from September 2019. An option for a sixth service in the future was available. The new service would have used the Mark 4 coaches as planned, but with Class 90 rather than Class 91 locomotives.

In June 2019, the proposed services were transferred from GNWR owner Alliance Rail Holdings to Grand Central. The services were due to begin in spring 2020, but were postponed until spring 2021 due to the COVID-19 pandemic. However, in September 2020, Grand Central announced that it had decided not to proceed with the introduction of the service following a collapse in projected patronage.

== Rolling stock ==
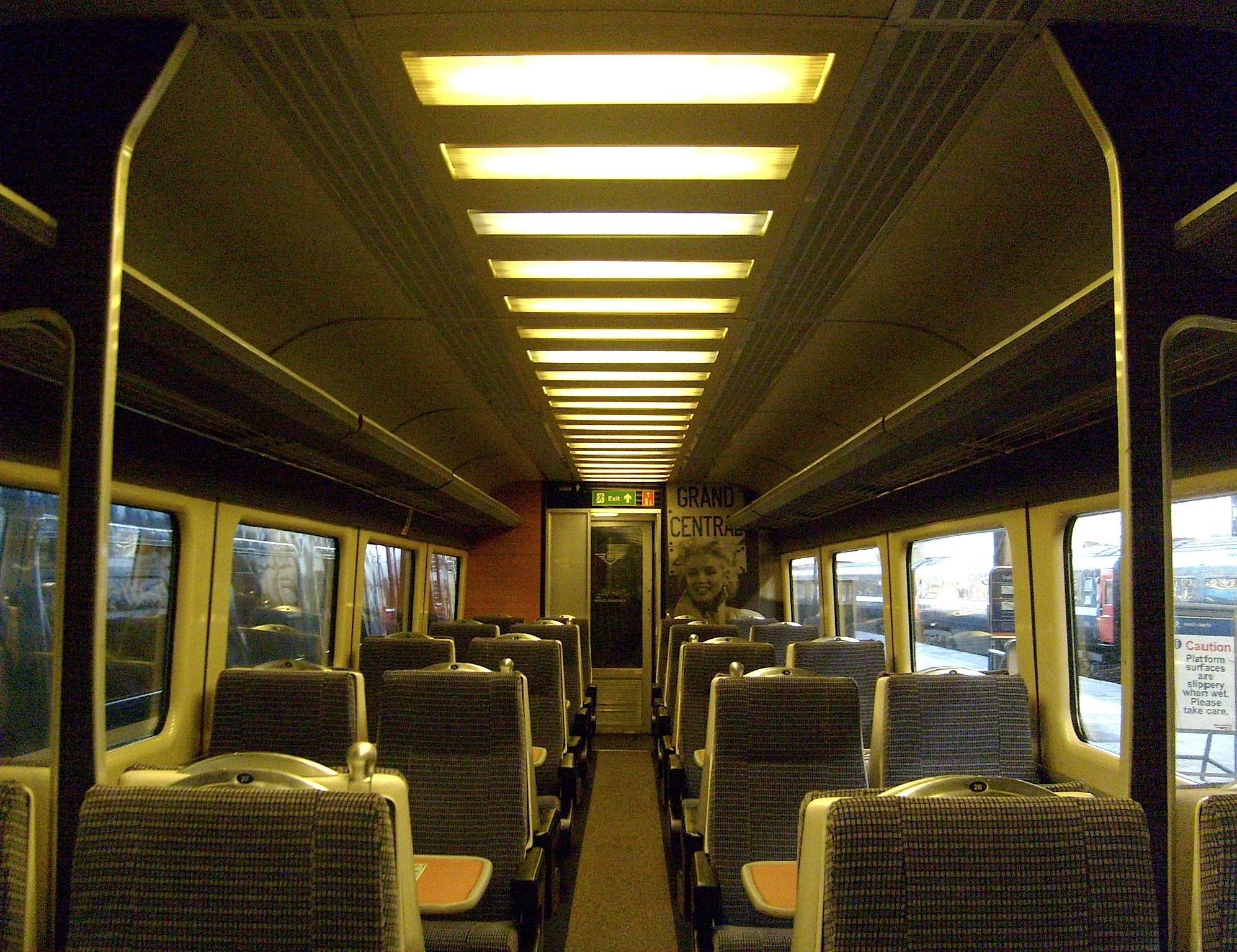
Mark 3 standard class interior

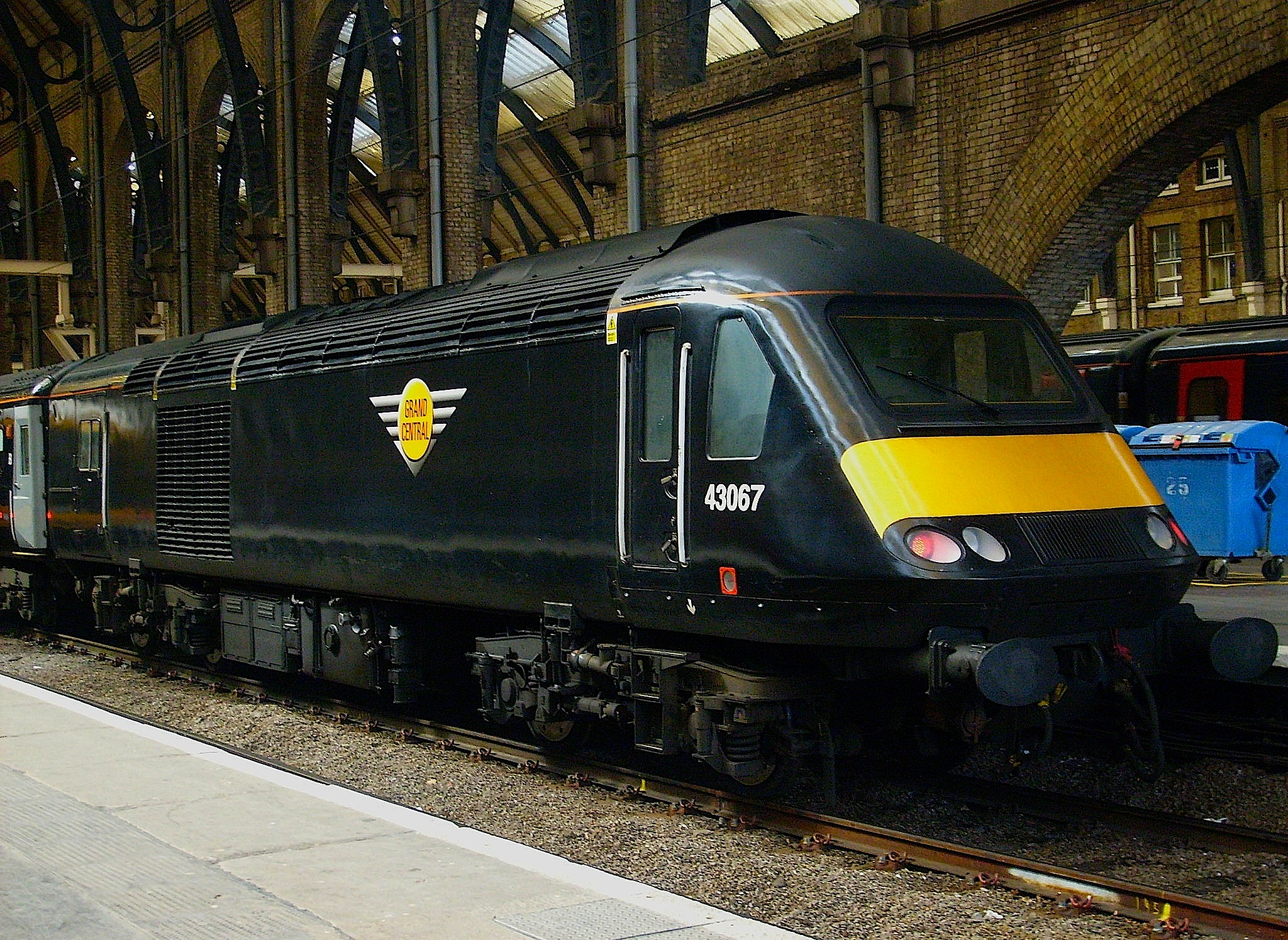
Class 43 HST at King's Cross in the original livery in 2009

Grand Central's application to the ORR in February 2005 had proposed using Class 67 locomotives hauling five Mark 3 carriages and a Driving Van Trailer. As the paths were only granted on the basis of 125 mph stock being used, other stock had to be sourced. It was then proposed to use a fleet of Bombardier Transportation five-carriage Class 222 units, similar to those already in use with Midland Mainline and Hull Trains. Difficulty in securing these led to Grand Central deciding to use High Speed Trains.

In October 2006, sister company Sovereign Trains purchased six Class 43 power cars and 18 Mark 3 carriages from Porterbrook. The Class 43s, that all had buffers fitted when they were modified in the late 1980s for use with Class 91 locomotives during the electrification of the East Coast Main Line, were sent for overhaul at Devonport Management Limited, Plymouth. The Mark 3s were overhauled at Marcroft Engineering, Stoke-on-Trent. Eighteen of the Mark 3 coaches were former Virgin Trains West Coast loco-hauled carriages that required rewiring in order to work with the power cars due to different electrical requirements.

Due to delays encountered during the overhauls, Grand Central investigated leasing spare InterCity 125 sets from Midland Mainline. However, nothing came of this and it was not until December 2007 that enough stock had been delivered for operations to commence. The full fleet was in service by March 2008.

Problems encountered with the rolling stock, including all six of the power cars being out of traffic at the same time, saw Grand Central hire Class 67 locomotives from the freight haulage company English Welsh & Scottish (EWS), Class 47 locomotives from Riviera Trains, and Class 57 locomotives from Virgin Trains to haul Riviera Trains' Mark 2 carriages on shuttles from Sunderland to York in summer 2008 as well as InterCity power cars from Midland Mainline.

In March 2010, the InterCity 125s were sold to Angel Trains which funded an overhaul including re-powering the Class 43 at Brush Traction with MTU 16V4000R41 engines.

To operate the fourth Sunderland service, a pair of Class 180 Adelante units were leased from Angel Trains in 2009, followed by another three to operate the Bradford services in 2010. Before entering service, 180112 was named James Herriot in July 2009. The remaining two units, 180105 and 180114, entered service later in 2009. Grand Central secured two further Class 180s, 180101 and 180107, bringing the total number to five. The Class 180 fleet operate both Sunderland and Bradford services, with the InterCity 125 trains usually only operating services to Sunderland, although they have operated to Bradford on occasions.

Grand Central withdrew its HST fleet at the end of 2017, with a transfer to East Midlands Trains for the three six-car sets. The company received five additional Class 180 Adelante sets from Great Western Railway (GWR), made available due to the rollout of the Intercity Express Programme.

Initially, Grand Central adopted an all black livery with doors painted gold (first class) and silver (standard class). When the Class 180 was introduced, an orange band was introduced.

In June 2023 it was announced that Grand Central would be leasing two Class 221 units (numbers 221142 and 221143) for use on services between London King's Cross and Bradford.

=== Current fleet ===
| Family | Class | Image | Type | Top speed | | Number | Carriages | Routes operated | Built |
| Family | Class | Image | Type | mph | km/h | Number | Carriages | Routes operated | Built |
|---|---|---|---|---|---|---|---|---|---|
| Alstom Coradia 1000 | 180 Adelante | | DMU | 125 | 200 | 10 | 5 | London King's Cross – Sunderland / Bradford Interchange | 2000–2001 |
| Bombardier Voyager | 221 Super Voyager | | DEMU | 125 | 200 | 2 | 5 | London King's Cross - Bradford Interchange | 2001–2002 |

=== Future fleet ===
In April 2025, Grand Central announced that it had ordered nine 5-car trains from Hitachi Rail. These trains would be able to run on overhead lines, battery or diesel and were to be introduced in 2028. They will entirely replace the Class 180s and Class 221s in the Grand Central fleet and increase the numbers of seats by 20%.

| Family | Class | Type | Top speed | | Number | Carriages | Seats | Expected delivery |
| Family | Class | Type | mph | km/h | Number | Carriages | Seats | Expected delivery |
|---|---|---|---|---|---|---|---|---|
| Hitachi AT300 | 820 | Tri-mode | TBA | TBA | 9 | 5 | TBA | 2028 |

=== Past fleet ===
| Class | Image | Type | Top speed | | Number | Carriages | Routes operated | Built | Withdrawn |
| Class | Image | Type | mph | km/h | Number | Carriages | Routes operated | Built | Withdrawn |
|---|---|---|---|---|---|---|---|---|---|
InterCity 125 trains (HSTs)
| 43 | | Diesel locomotive | 125 | 201 | 6 | 6 | London King's Cross – Sunderland | 1976-82 | 2017 |
| Mark 3 | | Passenger carriage | 125 | 201 | 18 | 6 | London King's Cross – Sunderland | 1976-82 | 2017 |

=== Cancelled fleet ===
Grand Central were to procure sets for services between Blackpool North and London Euston, made up of six Mark 4 coaches hauled by a Class 90 locomotive, and tailed by a driving van trailer, however these were returned off-lease due to the cancellation of the route. The rolling stock had already been overhauled and training runs had commenced before the service was cancelled in September 2020.

| Class | Image | Type | Top speed | | Number | Carriages |
| Class | Image | Type | mph | km/h | Number | Carriages |
|---|---|---|---|---|---|---|
| 90 | | Electric locomotive | 110 | 177 | 5 | 2 + 6 |
| Mark 4 | | Passenger carriage | 140 | 225 | 30 | 2 + 6 |
| Driving Van Trailer | | Driving Van Trailer | 140 | 225 | 5 | 2 + 6 |

== Depots ==
Grand Central's fleet is maintained at Tyne Yard and Crofton depots. Between the 2011 Arriva takeover and the fleet's retirement in 2017, heavy maintenance on the InterCity 125 was performed at Arriva TrainCare, Crewe.

== See also ==
- Grand Central, Birmingham
