= Tom Winsor =

British civil servant (born 1957)

Sir Thomas Winsor

2nd Rail Regulator
- In office 5 July 1999 – 4 July 2004
- Appointed by: John Prescott
- Prime Minister: Tony Blair
- Succeeded by: Post abolished
- Preceded by: John Swift QC; Chris Bolt (interim)

Her Majesty's Chief Inspector of Constabulary
- In office 1 October 2012 – 1 April 2022
- Appointed by: Theresa May
- Prime Minister: David Cameron
- Preceded by: Sir Denis O'Connor
- Succeeded by: Andy Cooke

Her Majesty's Chief Inspector of Fire and Rescue Services
- In office 17 July 2017 – 1 April 2022
- Appointed by: Amber Rudd
- Prime Minister: Theresa May
- Preceded by: Post established
- Succeeded by: Andy Cooke

Personal details
- Born: 7 December 1957 (age 68) Broughty Ferry, Dundee, Scotland, United Kingdom
- Education: University of Edinburgh, University of Dundee

Sir Thomas Philip Winsor (born 7 December 1957) is a British arbitrator and mediator, lawyer, consultant and economic regulatory professional.

Between 1 October 2012 and 31 March 2022, he served as Her Majesty's Chief Inspector of Constabulary.

Between 5 July 1999 and 4 July 2004, he served as the Rail Regulator and International Rail Regulator for Great Britain. He oversaw the collapse of Railtrack, the infrastructure manager for the British rail network and the creation and refinancing of the successor network infrastructure manager, Network Rail.

Born in Broughty Ferry, Dundee, Winsor practised law in various capacities from 1979 to 1999 and between 2004 and 2012. He maintains his licence to practise law.

In October 2010, UK Home Secretary Theresa May MP appointed him to carry out a controversial, wide-ranging review of the remuneration and conditions of service of police officers and staff in England and Wales, the first for over 30 years. Following the final publication of the review in March 2012, the Home Secretary nominated him to serve as Her Majesty's Chief Inspector of Constabulary in June 2012, the first to be appointed from outside the police service. Following confirmation hearings, he began his role in October 2012. He left office on 31 March 2022, on the expiry of his last term of office.

In July 2017, he was additionally appointed as the first Her Majesty's Chief Inspector of Fire & Rescue Services, overseeing an expanded Her Majesty's Inspectorate of Constabulary and Fire & Rescue Services. His policing and fire appointments ran together, and expired on the same day.

From 4 April 2022, he established himself as an arbitrator and mediator, both domestic (UK) and international. He is a member of the London-based Chartered Institute of Arbitrators.

In the 2015 New Year Honours list, it was announced Winsor was to be knighted; he received his knighthood from Queen Elizabeth II on 19 March 2015, at Buckingham Palace.

== Early life ==
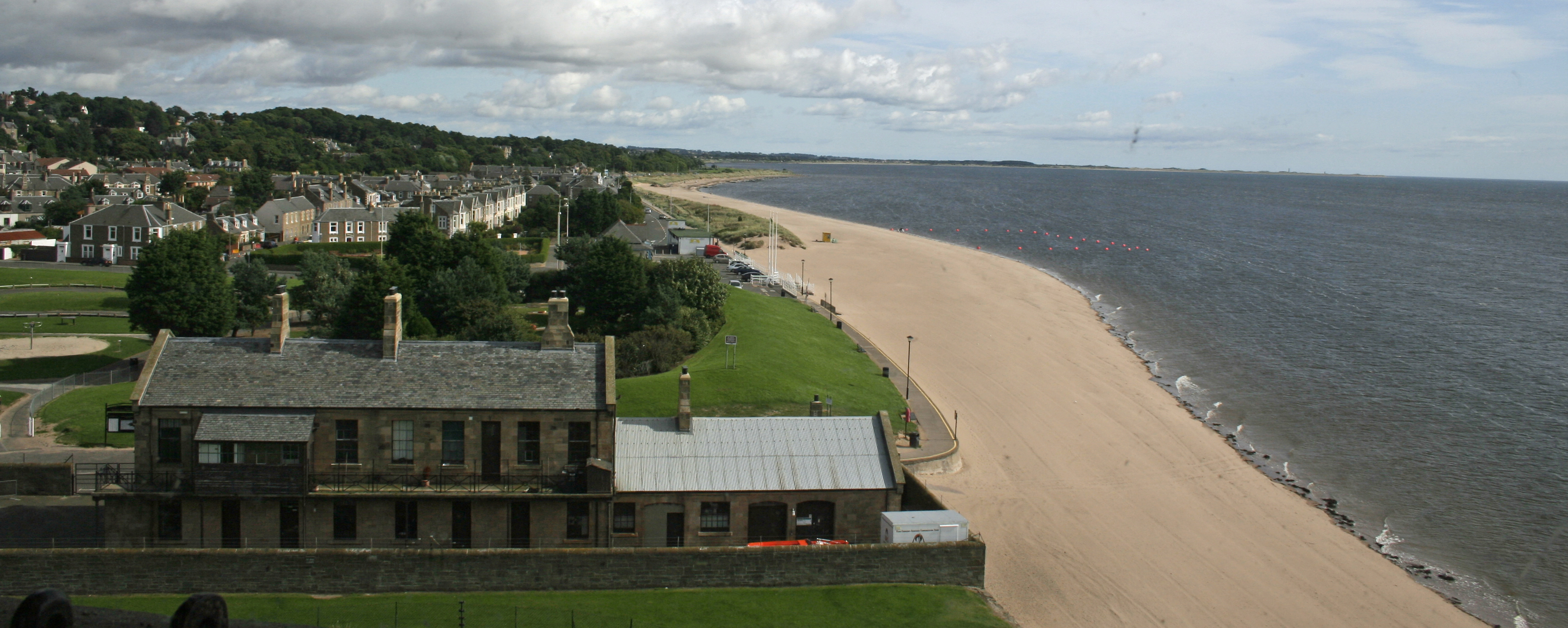
Broughty Ferry in Dundee, where Winsor grew up

Winsor was born on 7 December 1957 in Broughty Ferry, Dundee to Thomas V M Winsor and Phyllis Bonsor. He was educated at Grove Academy state comprehensive school in Broughty Ferry. In 1976, he went to the University of Edinburgh to study law. After graduation in 1979, he served his two-year Scots legal apprenticeship with Dundee law firm Thorntons & Dickies. He practised for a year after that doing mainly litigation in Dundee Sheriff Court. In 1982 he enrolled as a postgraduate student at the Centre for Petroleum and Mineral Law Studies of the University of Dundee under Professor T C Daintith. He received a Diploma in Petroleum Law in 1983. He became a Writer to the Signet (WS) in 1984.

The leading Edinburgh law firm Dundas & Wilson employed him as a solicitor from 1983 until 1984. He then moved to London and joined City law firm Norton Rose, specialising in energy law and project finance. In 1991 he left Norton Rose to become a partner in City law firm Denton Hall. He worked on the design and implementation of the regulatory regime for the privatisation of the electricity industry in Northern Ireland.

After the flotation of Northern Ireland Electricity on the London stock exchange in 1993, Winsor was seconded to the Government Legal Service. He served as chief legal adviser and general counsel to the first Rail Regulator, John Swift QC. The Rail Regulator was the statutory officer established by the Railways Act 1993 for the economic regulation of the British railway industry, which was about to be privatised. Winsor's secondment lasted two years and he returned to Denton Hall in August 1995.

== Rail Regulator 1999–2004 ==
=== Appointment ===
In July 1999, John Prescott MP, Secretary of State for the Environment, Transport and the Regions and Deputy Prime Minister, appointed Winsor as Chris Bolt's successor as Rail Regulator and International Rail Regulator.

On his appointment after the British general election in 1997, Prescott had declared he was going to take a far tougher line with the privatised railway industry. Prescott had been fiercely opposed to the privatisation in 1996 and was one of the 'old Labour' stalwarts who wanted to renationalise the industry outright. Despite having said in opposition that its policy was a 'publicly owned, publicly accountable railway', New Labour would not promise renationalisation, even if it could have afforded it. In its manifesto for the 1997 election, it had committed itself to a policy of increased accountability of the privatised companies to the public interest through tougher and more effective regulation.

This was seen as an imaginative policy. If it was properly implemented, it could achieve virtually all the government's objectives for a better performing, more efficient railway without the expense or controversy of renationalising the assets. At the Labour Party conference in September 1998, Prescott declared that he was going to carry out a 'spring clean of the regulators'. Many commentators realised this meant the appointment of a tougher, more interventionist replacement for Swift.

=== New regulatory approach ===
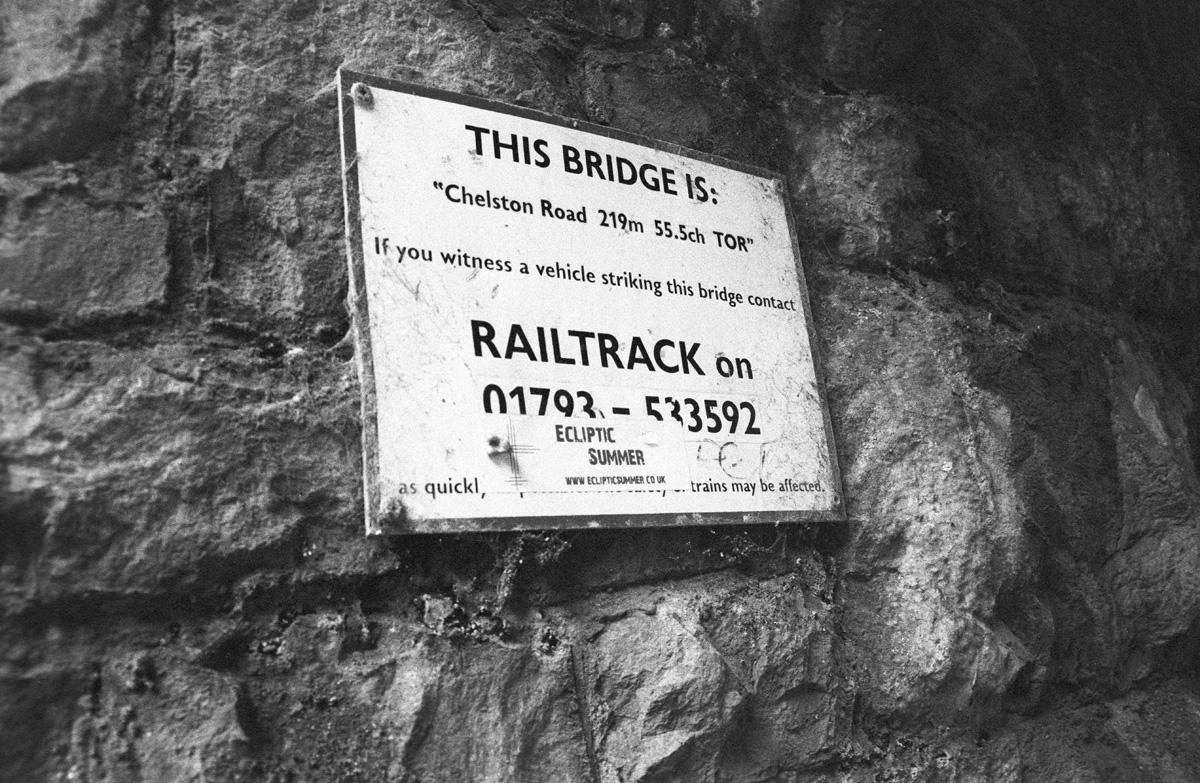
Photograph of a Railtrack sign on a bridge

Winsor's five-year term as Rail Regulator began on 5 July 1999. He immediately announced a new regulatory agenda, one which contemplated holding the privatised railway companies much more closely to account. It also involved radical changes to the regulatory and contractual matrix for the privatised industry. It replaced enforcement regulation with incentives, and changed the financial, contractual and licensing environment in which the industry operated.

Winsor's ability to pursue his new regulatory agenda was significantly hampered by problems with Railtrack coming to a head very shortly after he took office. One of Winsor's principal motivations in applying for the post of Rail Regulator had been his frustration with — some critics elevated it to a visceral hatred of — Railtrack's incompetence and how it impeded so much progress in the privatised railway. He was also reported as being increasingly exasperated with the failure of his predecessor to hold Railtrack properly to account, and to use the powers of the office to apply pressure on the company and to reform—increase—the powers of the Rail Regulator to make regulatory and contractual accountabilities more effective.

Winsor was severely critical of what he found when he took over the office of the Rail Regulator. He described it as a dysfunctional organisation, which was inward-looking and barely able to do the job it had been given by Parliament. He said changing this quickly was all the more important because the ability of the train operators—Railtrack's direct customers—to apply pressure and secure fair terms and reasonable performance from the infrastructure operator was weak. This was because their contracts were weak, with a poor specification of what they got for their money and uncertain and ineffective remedies when things went wrong.

His reform agenda had three major planks:

1. changing the financial framework in which the infrastructure manager operated through the periodic review of its revenue requirements, changing the structure of access charges so as to introduce a higher degree of incentives; this led to his deciding (in October 2000) to increase Railtrack's income from £10 billion to £15 billion for the five-year control period 2001–2006.
2. reforming Railtrack's network licence—its principal instrument of accountability to the public interest—by the introduction of nine new conditions covering matters such as its disposal of land, dealings with dependent users, the establishment of a reliable, comprehensive register of the capacity, condition and capability of its assets, its means of accounting and its stewardship of its assets (including the setting up of a system of regulatory reporters to assess the company's progress and competences in areas of network operation specified by the regulator).
3. completely rewriting the contracts at the track-train interface, replacing a contractual structure which set the infrastructure manager against its customers with a true, co-operative joint venture of mutual interest, recognising the intensity of the interdependence of the two parties; this was achieved by the establishment of a new model track access contract and major reforms to the industry-wide network code.

The reform to the financial structure was announced on 23 October 2000, only a few days after the Hatfield rail crash. The aftermath of Hatfield—what it revealed about the state of Railtrack's asset knowledge—led to the carrying out of a further financial review in 2002–2003. The conclusions were announced on 12 December 2003 and gave Network Rail (Railtrack's successor) an additional £7.4 billion.

=== Problems with Railtrack ===
Winsor's focus was on Railtrack, which he regarded as performing most unsatisfactorily. He criticised it for 'policies of neglect of its assets and hostility to its customers'. In his first month in office he took enforcement action against it in relation to its performance. He threatened a maximum financial penalty of £42 million if it failed to improve its performance towards passenger train operators by 12.7% in the operating year 1999–2000. The penalty would be £4 million for each percentage point it missed. Railtrack eventually missed this target by 2.7% and was fined £7.9 million in December 2001. Railtrack criticised the penalty as 'the largest fine in corporate history' which it was not. But it did represent a significant hardening of regulatory approach to the one which the company had enjoyed under the previous regulator.

Winsor's relationship with Railtrack was stormy. He saw it as his duty to hold the company more closely and vigorously to account. He criticised its many failures, including its poor knowledge of the condition, capacity and capability of its assets, rising numbers of broken rails and deteriorating track quality measures, its bad relationship with its train operator customers, its performance shortcomings, poor contracting and procurement strategies and the soaring costs of its projects (especially the renewal and upgrade of the West Coast main line). Instead of getting involved in eye-catching new projects such as taking over the London Underground and High Speed 1, Winsor believed Railtrack should concentrate on the core job of operating, maintaining and renewing the national network.

Gerald Corbett, Railtrack's chief executive, led the management team which resisted this new regulatory pressure. On 3 April 2000, under the headline 'Railtrack Declares War on Regulator', The Guardian newspaper reported that 'Railtrack is adopting a "culture of defiance" against the rail regulator.' Winsor was reported as describing this stance as an 'attitude which beggars belief'. However, the relationship between the two men was courteous and professional, even though Winsor was a severe critic of the philosophy and approach underlying Corbett's leadership of Railtrack.

=== Hatfield and its aftermath ===
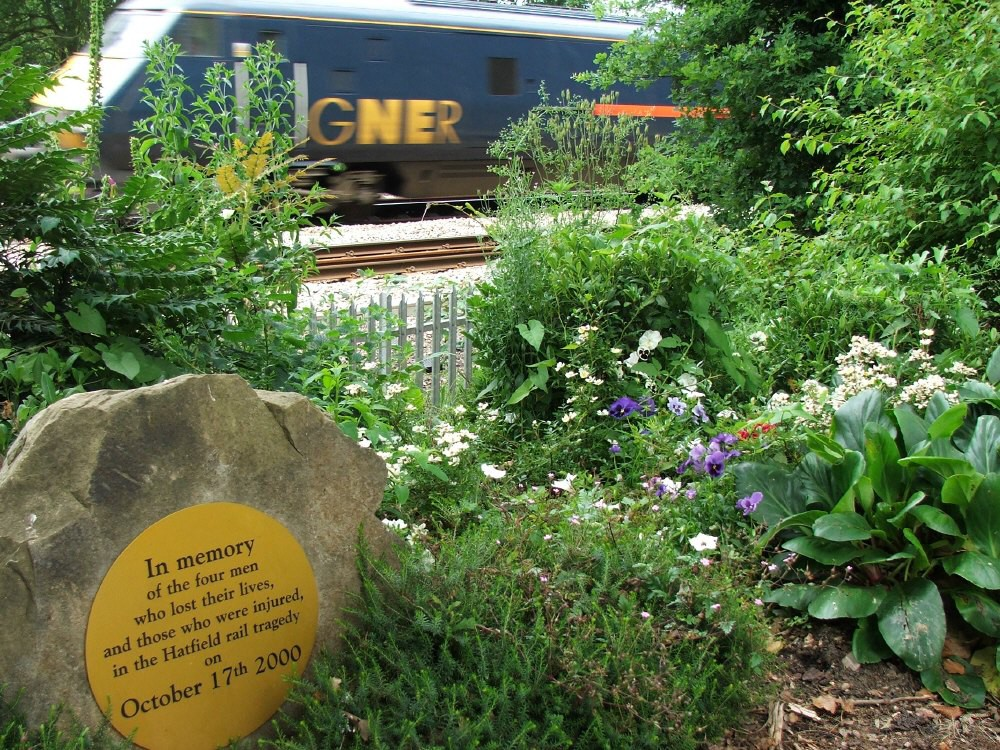
An InterCity 225 passing a memorial garden for the crash victims

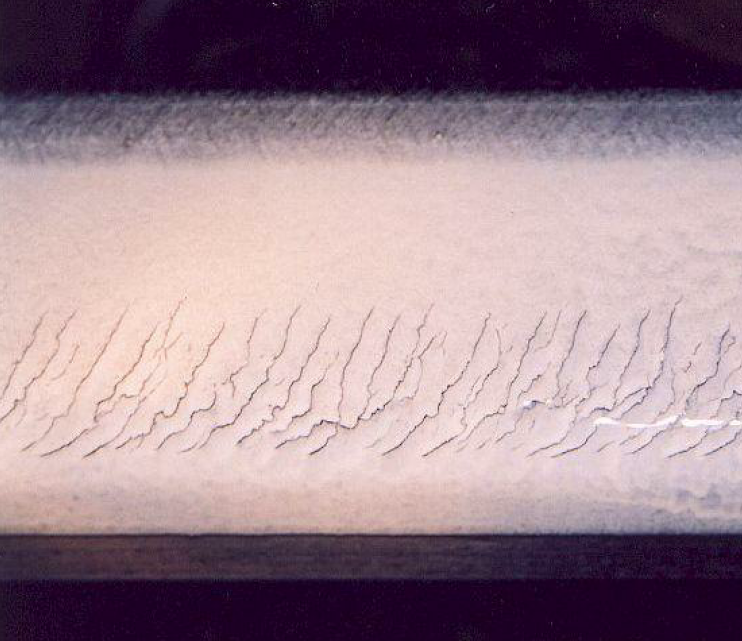
Well-defined gauge corner cracking from high-speed passenger train operation

Further enforcement action came in 2000 over Railtrack's inadequate work on the renewal and upgrade of the West Coast main line. But the watershed for the company— and the British railway industry—was on 17 October 2000 when a broken rail caused a high-speed train, travelling at 115 mph (185 km/h), to derail at Hatfield, north of London, killing four passengers and injuring over 70 more. Corbett immediately offered his resignation, but the company's senior management tried to rally support for him amongst senior figures in the railway industry to persuade him not to go. Prescott and Winsor withheld their support, although they did not do it publicly. Corbett's resignation was not accepted by Railtrack's board, but a month later when he offered his resignation a second time, it went through. Steve Marshall, the company's finance director, succeeded Corbett.

Because Railtrack's asset knowledge was so poor, it did not know with sufficient certainty where else on its network the type of metal fatigue—called gauge corner cracking or rolling contact fatigue—could cause another accident. It imposed over 1200 emergency speed restrictions across the network, causing the effective disintegration of the integrity of the operational network for months. Winsor took further enforcement action against Railtrack, first to compel the production of a coherent recovery plan—something the company had failed to do for six weeks after the crash—and then to ensure the plan was carried out. Normal network operation was substantially achieved in May 2001.

=== New financial settlement for Railtrack ===
On 23 October 2000, Winsor announced a new regulatory financial settlement of £14.8 billion for Railtrack for the five years 2001-2006 This represented a 50% increase over the settlement for the previous regulatory control period, 1995–2001. This was the culmination of a regulatory review of the company's asset maintenance and management plans, and the demands which passenger and freight train operators were likely to make of the network in the future. Railtrack's poor asset knowledge hampered the work. The fact that the company's information—and that of the Office of the Rail Regulator in the past—was so unsatisfactory frustrated Winsor.

Railtrack had the right to appeal Winsor's decision on its financial settlement to the UK Competition Commission. It decided not to do so, principally because on 15 January 2001 Winsor made a public announcement committing to carry out an interim regulatory review of the company's financial position, with the potential—near certainty— it would lead to a substantial increase in Railtrack's allowed revenues, to finance the substantially increased work programme which the Hatfield crash showed was necessary.

To alleviate the immediate financial pressures of the huge cost increases of the rerailing programme after Hatfield, Railtrack agreed with the government an acceleration of part of Winsor's financial settlement on 1 April 2001. This brought revenues forward into 2001 which were not due to be paid to the company until 2006. Winsor endorsed the acceleration. To achieve favourable accounting treatment for the revenues, the government agreed that its franchising arm, the Strategic Rail Authority, would set up a 50:50 joint venture company, known as Renewco. The accelerated revenues would be made available to Railtrack via that vehicle. The agreement was that Renewco would be set up by 30 June 2001; if not, Railtrack would have the right to apply to Winsor for an interim regulatory review.

=== New chairman – secret negotiations with government ===
In June 2001, Railtrack appointed a new chairman, John Robinson. It then embarked upon secret negotiations with the government for a generous financial bail-out, deliberately concealed from Winsor, who could and would have thwarted what was being proposed. The Railtrack negotiating strategy involved the government agreeing to cost-plus financing of the company for several years, and a four-year suspension of the economic regulatory regime. Many commentators have subsequently remarked that Railtrack was naive to think the government would ever agree to such a thing, but Railtrack apparently thought so. During this time, Renewco was not set up, and Railtrack (and the Strategic Rail Authority, which was also in the dark about the negotiations) pressed the government to do so.

The government did not regard Railtrack's bailout proposals as their only option. They prepared for an alternative in secret, the insolvency of Railtrack. As a result, the company would be put into railway administration, a special kind of corporate status which ensured continuity of network operations, despite the financial condition of the operator.

=== Threat to independent regulation ===
On 5 October 2001, Transport Secretary Stephen Byers called Winsor to a meeting to explain the government regarded Railtrack as insolvent. Byers advised him a petition for railway administration in respect of Railtrack would be made to the High Court in London on 7 October 2001. Winsor expressed surprise that the company was on the precipice of insolvency, having just had a 50% increase in its allowed revenues in his October 2000 regulatory review. Moreover, the company had not said anything about its precarious position to him though he had the power to advance potentially billions of pounds in additional revenues to it. Winsor asked Byers whether the chairman of Railtrack knew all this. Byers replied that Robinson would be informed at a meeting immediately after Winsor's interview with the Secretary of State. Winsor told Byers he expected Railtrack to apply to him immediately for the promised interim review after hearing this news. Byers replied that any such step would lead the government to introduce emergency legislation into Parliament. This would take the rail regulator under direct political control, to stop the review taking place. Winsor told Byers of the very severe adverse consequences such a step would involve, but Byers was unmoved.

The next day, Saturday 6 October 2001, the board of Railtrack met to discuss what the government intended to do. In the early evening, they called Winsor and asked whether he would be prepared to carry out an interim review. Despite the threatened legislation to stop him, Winsor replied that he would help. Although he explained to Railtrack that he could not complete an interim review over a single weekend, he said he would be prepared to make a public statement that he had started the process. He suggested to Railtrack that if they were to show that to the administration judge the next day, the administration order would probably not be made. But Railtrack rejected Winsor's willingness to intervene, and the company went into unopposed administration on Sunday 7 October 2001.

=== Adverse City and industry reaction ===
Immediately after Railtrack went into administration (the same day the US and UK began the war in Afghanistan) there followed a period of very considerable public and City criticism of what the government had done. There were allegations of renationalisation by the back door, and great turbulence in investor confidence, as Winsor had warned. The government strongly asserted it had been justified in reacting as it had to a 'failed privatisation' and a railway in crisis. It said firmly there would be no compensation for investors. Railtrack shareholders immediately made plans to sue the government for what they saw as the unlawful confiscation of their property. Winsor maintained media silence on the affair for a month, until 7 November 2001 when he gave oral evidence to the House of Commons Transport Select Committee. In that evidence, he explained what had happened, and the threatened legislation to extinguish independent economic regulation of the railway industry. That evidence led to Stephen Byers being called to account for his actions in Parliament, since on 5 November 2001 he had denied to Parliament making any threats to Winsor. As a result of the controversy, Winsor was put under increasing political pressure. The prime minister's official spokesman refused to tell journalists whether the prime minister still had confidence in the rail regulator.

As he later explained, Winsor refused to resign since he had done nothing wrong. In the face of industry and financial markets' pressure, the government withdrew their threatened legislation and instead announced the regulatory regime for the railways would be reviewed. The independence and jurisdiction of the rail regulator were unaltered during the remainder of Winsor's five-year term. Later after his term ended on 15 July 2004, the government announced a legislative intention to reduce the power of the rail regulator. It intended to advance additional money to Railtrack's successor, Network Rail, at future regulatory reviews.

The controversy of Railtrack's administration continued. Byers' political problems intensified with other problems, including difficulties associated with the actions of his special adviser Jo Moore. She had remarked to a colleague at the Department for Transport Local Government and the Regions that 11 September 2001 may be a good day to bury bad news. The controversial and mishandled departure of his press spokesman Martin Sixsmith was also a problem. Byers was subjected to relentless media and political attacks, and on 28 May 2002 he resigned. He never regained Ministerial office.

Byers' replacement as Secretary of State for Transport was Alistair Darling MP. It fell to Darling to get Railtrack out of administration. The process was taking far longer than had first been supposed by Byers or senior civil servants at the Department for Transport.

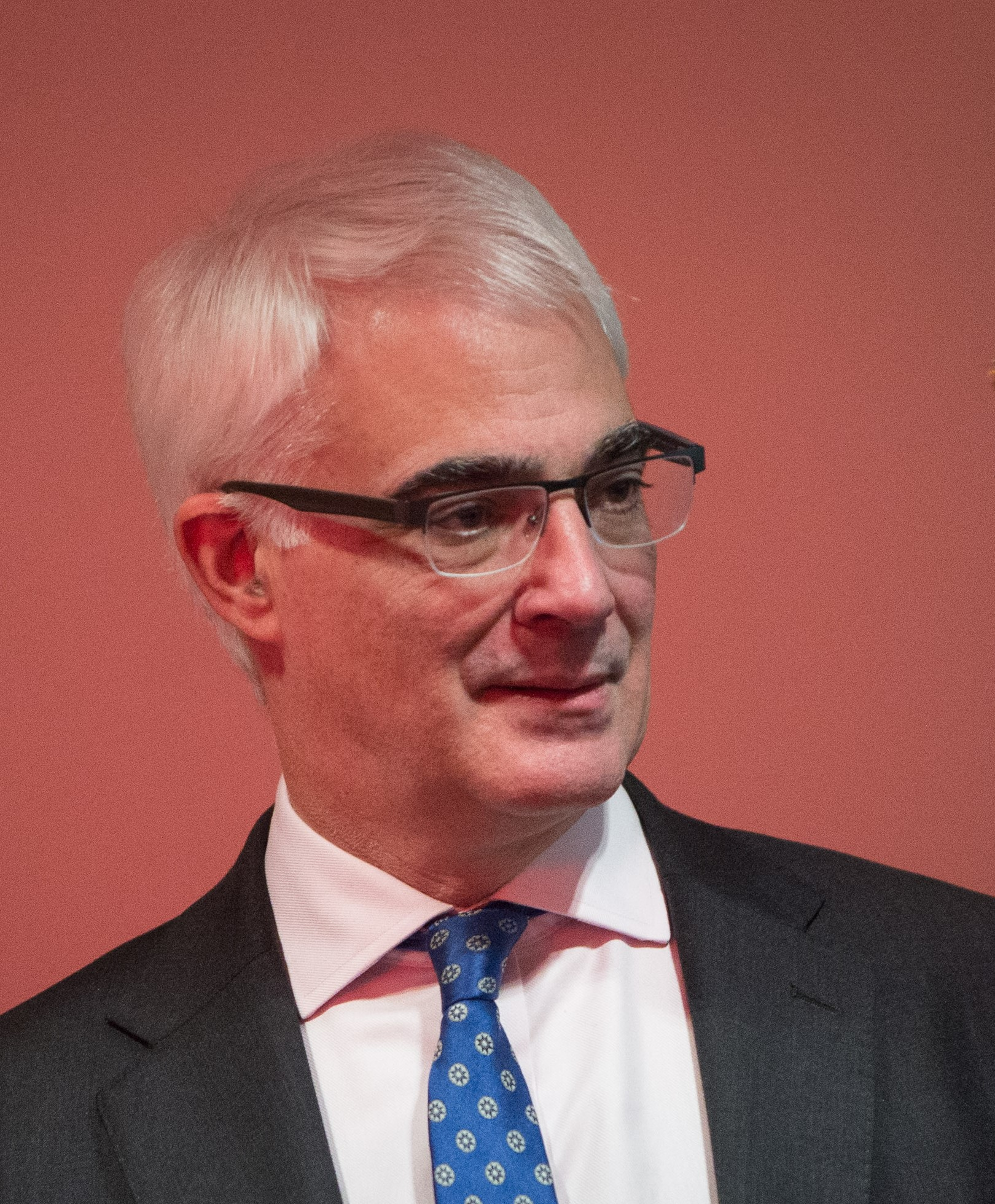
Alistair Darling, who replaced Stephen Byers as transport secretary.

=== Railtrack – how to end the administration ===
The government realised ending Railtrack's administration required the High Court to be satisfied the company was solvent. Darling needed Winsor to announce his willingness to carry out an interim review of the company's financial position, with the probability he would allocate substantially greater sums to the company for the operation, maintenance and renewal of the network. To enable Winsor to make that decision, Darling knew he needed to make a formal statement to Parliament to the effect that the government had reviewed the economic regulatory regime for the railways and was satisfied with it, and in particular that its independence was an essential cornerstone of the regime and of continuing private investor confidence in the railways. Darling made that statement on 12 June 2002, and Winsor announced his intention to carry out the interim review on 22 September 2002.

As a result, on 2 October 2002 the government was able to tell the High Court Railtrack was not insolvent. The regulatory review had been promised and could lead to substantially more money for the company. That explanation satisfied the High Court and it discharged the railway administration order on 2 October 2002. Railtrack was immediately acquired by Network Rail and renamed Network Rail Infrastructure Limited on 3 February 2003.

=== £22.2 billion settlement ===
Winsor's interim regulatory review lasted until 12 December 2003. He then announced an additional £7.4 billion in funding, taking Network Rail's income for the five years 2004–2009 to £22.2 billion.

Winsor was severely criticised by some politicians—notably the House of Commons Transport Select Committee under the chairmanship of the MP Gwyneth Dunwoody—for his power to increase public spending on the railways by such a large amount without Treasury approval. Winsor's reply was that was his statutory remit, and he would not be deterred by irrelevant political considerations in carrying it out.

=== End of term ===
On 5 July 2004, the government brought the Railways and Transport Safety Act 2003 into force. It abolished the statutory position of Rail Regulator and replaced the single-person regulator model with a nine-member corporate board called the Office of Rail Regulation. This change was made in line with the Labour government's policy of establishing regulatory boards to take the place of single regulators. Railways were the last but one of the principal economic regulators to be reformed in this way (the last being the regulatory authority for the water industry). Winsor later remarked he was glad that for five years he had been able to do the work of nine people. In January 2007, the ORR board was enlarged to 11 members.

== White & Case ==
Between July 2004 and September 2012, he was a partner in the London office of White & Case, the international law firm headquartered in New York. In that time, his practice began predominantly in UK rail matters. It soon expanded to cover transport and infrastructure matters in the Far East, the Middle East, Europe and Africa. His advice was often sought on matters of the design and reform of economic regulatory systems, as well as major infrastructure projects. He resigned as a partner of White & Case on 30 September 2012, in order to take up appointment as HM Chief Inspector of Constabulary the following day.

== Review of police officers' and staff pay and conditions ==
On 1 October 2010, the UK Home Secretary, Theresa May MP, announced that Winsor was to carry out a review of police pay and working conditions. The purpose stated was to improve service for the public and maximise value for money. The review was given the job of making recommendations about the pay and conditions of the 43 established police forces in England and Wales. The last major review into the pay and condition of police officers was written by Lord Edmund-Davies in 1978. There had been a high-profile review by Sir Patrick Sheehy rejected in 1993. Former West Midlands Chief Constable Sir Edward Crew and Professor Richard Disney of the University of Nottingham supported Winsor in carrying out the review with professional advice. The review was required to report to the Home Secretary in two parts: the first on short-term improvements to the police service in March 2011, and the second on matters of longer-term reform in March 2012.

The Home Office announcement of the review stated its three main objectives:

- use remuneration and conditions of service to maximise officer and staff deployment to front-line roles where their powers and skills are required;
- provide remuneration and conditions of service that are fair to and reasonable for both the taxpayer and police officers and staff; and
- enable modern management practices in line with practices elsewhere in the public sector and the wider economy.

=== Part 1 ===
The Home Office published the first part report 8 March 2011. Broadly, it recommended savings of £1.1 billion from the police pay bill over three years September 2011 – September 2014. £485 million would go to the taxpayer and £625 million would be redirected to 'front-line policing'. The report suggested the pay budget be redistributed in such a way that some police officers would receive pay cuts whilst other officers would benefit. Front-line policing was defined as the officers doing the hardest and most dangerous duties and those who have and use the highest professional skills, in areas like firearms, investigation (detectives), neighbourhood policing and public order.

The Home Secretary referred the Part 1 proposals to the statutory Police Negotiating Board (PNB) for formal consideration. The PNB failed to agree on the proposals and referred them to the Police Arbitration Tribunal (PAT), which reported on 8 January 2012. The PAT supported ten of the eighteen Part 1 recommendations, and deferred consideration on others pending the appearance of the Final Report (also known as Part 2 or Winsor 2). On 30 January 2012, the Home Secretary announced she would accept the PAT outcome on Part 1.

=== Part 2 ===
The Part 2 report, the Final Report of the review, was published on 15 March 2012. It contains recommendations of a much longer-term nature, including linking pay to performance rather than time-service, payment for the acquisition and use of accredited professional policing skills, the creation of a power akin to a right of police forces to make police officers redundant even if they have not yet attained full pensionable service and higher educational qualifications be required of recruits. It also recommends fast-track promotion to inspector rank for the most promising internal and external candidates, direct entry at superintendent rank for individuals of exceptional achievement in other sectors, and compulsory fitness tests for all officers. It proposes a more rigorous regime applying to officers on restricted duties (i.e. those who are unable to fulfill all the requirements of a police officer), a new retirement age of 60 for police officers, and the replacement of the PNB and the PAT with a pay review body for police officers and the settlement of chief officers' pay by the Senior Salaries Review Body.

On 27 March 2012, the Home Secretary made a statement to Parliament saying would direct the PNB and the Police Advisory Board for England and Wales to consider as a matter of urgency the Part 2 proposals on pay, promotion and other matters within their remits. In relation to direct entry at higher ranks, she said: 'I do not believe it is in the best interests of the service to restrict its ability to appoint officers to senior positions to a limited number of individuals. While police leaders have undoubted strengths, I want to ensure that the police service is able to draw upon the best pool of talent available. The Government believe that the review's recommendations on entry could support this and I will therefore consult partners on them.' The PNB and the PAB duly considered the Part 2 recommendations. The most controversial of them were referred to the Police Arbitration Tribunal, which reported its determination on 20 December 2013. The PAT rejected the proposal on compulsory severance for police officers with fewer than 30 years' service. On 14 February 2014 the Home Secretary announced she would accept the PAT decision and therefore would not proceed with it 'at this time', leaving open the possibility that it will be needed and should be introduced in the future.

Winsor's proposals for the abolition of the Police Negotiating Board and the Police Arbitration Tribunal were accepted. They were legislated for in the Anti-social Behaviour, Police and Crime Act 2014.

=== Reaction ===
Reaction to Part 1 of the report was mixed. The Association of Chief Police Officers welcomed the Part 1 report and said it hoped it would lay lasting foundations for the police service. The Police Federation said it would oppose the proposals as an unprecedented attack on police pay and conditions. Media reaction to the review was similarly mixed. It focused on comments from Police Federation of England and Wales on a number of process errors in the report. It also drew special attention to the claim that a very high proportion of officers were obese.

The Police Federation reacted adversely to the Part 2 report. It told the Home Secretary that its contents had placed its members in a state of 'utter dismay, consternation and disillusion'. It said that 'what Winsor is suggesting goes far beyond reform and threatens to undermine the very foundations of British policing and the public we serve'. It asked the Home Secretary to 'reject Winsor Part 2 outright'. On 10 May 2012 in London, it held a march to mark its opposition to the proposals. 32,000 officers attended and marched past the Home Office and the Houses of Parliament. The Federation also announced that it would be seeking 'full industrial rights' for police officers including the right to strike over pay and conditions.

The Association of Chief Police Officers was more positive in its reaction to the Part 2 report, although it acknowledged it would take time to absorb its 780 pages. It said it understood radical changes were required to absorb budget cuts and agreed with the move away from length of tenure as the sole criterion for increased pay. However, the 'core ethos of service and self-sacrifice' must not be put in danger.

== HM Chief Inspector of Constabulary ==
On 7 June 2012, the Home Office announced that the Home Secretary, Theresa May, MP, had selected Winsor as her preferred candidate to replace Sir Denis O'Connor as HM Chief Inspector of Constabulary for England and Wales. On 26 June 2012, Winsor appeared before the Home Affairs Select Committee of the House of Commons for a pre-appointment hearing. The Committee supported his appointment, and he was recommended formally to the Prime Minister and the Queen for appointment as HM Chief Inspector. Royal approval was given on 3 July 2012. The Police Federation criticised his election as he was the first Chief Inspector of Constabulary to be appointed from outside the police service. A protest march took place through London involving 30,000 police officers. As of 2015, Winsor was paid a salary of between £195,000 and £199,999 by the department, making him one of the 328 most highly paid people in the British public sector at that time.

On 19 December 2013, the Home Office announced its intention to increase HMIC's annual budget by £9.4 million to enable the Inspectorate to carry out annual, in-depth force inspections on core policing matters in every one of the 43 Home Office police forces in England and Wales, in addition to HMIC's programme of thematic inspections (28 such inspections are being carried out in the current inspection year). The design of the new inspection programme is being carried out in close consultation and co-operation with the police service, and will lead to an interim all-force assessment in November 2014, with the first full all-force inspection assessment in November 2015.

In March 2014, he published his first annual assessment of the efficiency and effectiveness of the police service in England and Wales. This fulfilled a new statutory requirement under the Police Reform and Social Responsibility Act 2011, an amendment to the Police Act 1996.

In the 2015 New Year honours list, it was announced Winsor was to be knighted. The Queen conferred his knighthood at Buckingham Palace on 19 March 2015.

Publishing his annual State of Policing report in April 2017, Winsor warned that the inadequacy in mental health care provision, partially due to the lack of available healthcare beds, was causing a drain on police resources. The police had to handle 240,000 mental health cases. This was criticised by the mental health charity Mind, which emphasised the importance of people with such issues getting the right support.

It was announced his role would be expanded to oversee fire and rescue services in the United Kingdom. HMIC would become 'the single inspectorate' for fire and policing, taking over the role of Her Majesty's Fire Service Inspectorate. The move was well-received within industry groups, with the National Fire Chiefs Council welcoming the increased accountability and transparency the move would bring. A recommendation was made to the Queen to appoint Winsor as the first Her Majesty's Chief Inspector of Fire & Rescue Services. His expanded role began on 17 July 2017.

In November 2017, allegations were leaked that the police found porn on First Secretary of State Damien Green's computer during a raid in November 2008. Winsor condemned the leak, which had been from retired police officers, saying they had an 'enduring' duty of confidentiality, even after they left the force. On 20 December 2017, Green was removed from his position after it was found he had lied to colleagues over the matter.

In April 2022, immediately after the end of Winsor's term in office as HM Chief Inspector of Constabulary, Home Secretary Priti Patel appointed Winsor to a non-statutory public office with the remit to investigate the circumstances in which the Mayor of London secured the resignation of Metropolitan Police Commissioner Cressida Dick. Winsor was also charged with making recommendations on how the regime of dual accountability of the Commissioner may be reformed, recognising that in London alone the chief officer of police has a relationship with both the Home Secretary and the Mayor of London. Winsor's report was submitted to the Home Secretary on 24 August 2022; it was published by the Home Office on 2 September 2022.

== Controversy ==
=== Railtrack ===
Winsor was a witness in the legal action, heard in the High Court in London in June and July 2005. 49,500 Railtrack private shareholders of Railtrack brought the action against the Secretary of State for Transport for misfeasance in public office. Not all aspects of the administration of Railtrack were aired in that case. In the House of Commons on 24 October 2005, further criticism was levelled at the government concerning the circumstances in which Railtrack went into administration. Shadow transport secretary Alan Duncan and Kenneth Clarke QC MP, made those criticisms. Transport Secretary Alistair Darling and Stephen Byers defended them.

In 2006 two of Winsor's policies established whilst he was Rail Regulator were challenged in the High Court in London. The issues were the structure of network access charges (October 2000), and the conditions on which new passenger train operators, without franchise contracts with the British government (called open access operators), are permitted to compete with companies which do (May 2004). The case was a judicial review brought by Great North Eastern Railway Company Ltd against the Office of Rail Regulation. Two open access operators were joined in the case as interested third parties. One of which, Grand Central Railway Company Ltd, was represented by Winsor. Winsor, therefore, both represented his client and gave evidence in the case as a witness. The defence of the case was successful.

=== Uniform ===
In 2013, Winsor was criticised for attending the National Police Memorial Day Service in a uniform similarly styled to that of a standard police uniform, as he has never served in the police force himself. Numerous online petitions started asking for him to be reprimanded. Winsor said he had worn the uniform as a mark of respect. Winsor answered the criticism by explaining that the uniform he wore was not a police officer's uniform, and was in fact the uniform of the chief inspector of constabulary. He told the Home Affairs Select Committee that far from wearing a uniform to which he was not entitled, he wore the uniform to which only he (as holder of that office at the time) was entitled.

=== Comments on communities 'born under other skies' ===
In 2014, Winsor claimed that there were certain communities 'born under other skies' which 'preferred to police themselves'. He argued that such areas were not 'no go zones' as such for police, but that in the absence of any contact between the persons who lived in such communities and British police, they simply 'won't know what's going on'. The comments were publicly criticised by the Home Affairs Select Committee chairman Keith Vaz.

=== Comments on officers' stress ===
In 2017, Winsor was asked in a live interview on Sky News why he thought there was a lack of police constables willing to move into the role of detective constable or to remain in that role. He replied: 'Detective work is much more stressful in many respects than being a response officer or a neighbourhood policing officer. If you are on response, if you're dealing with 999 calls, then in the main at the end of your shift you take nothing home. Detectives do take the problems home, they take the problems of the investigation and of course the risks that they carry if they make a mistake and they miss something. That's something they take home too.'

This sparked outrage from the policing community as well as from the public when officers began sharing on Twitter some of the things they have had to deal with whilst at work and the effect it had on them, using the hashtag #ITookHome. Many examples were of officers dealing with corpses, watching people die, or seeing the after effects of sexual or domestic abuse on both adults and children. In response to the outcry, Winsor quickly apologised, saying his comments were "plainly wrong".
