= Gerald Corbett =

British businessman (born 1951)

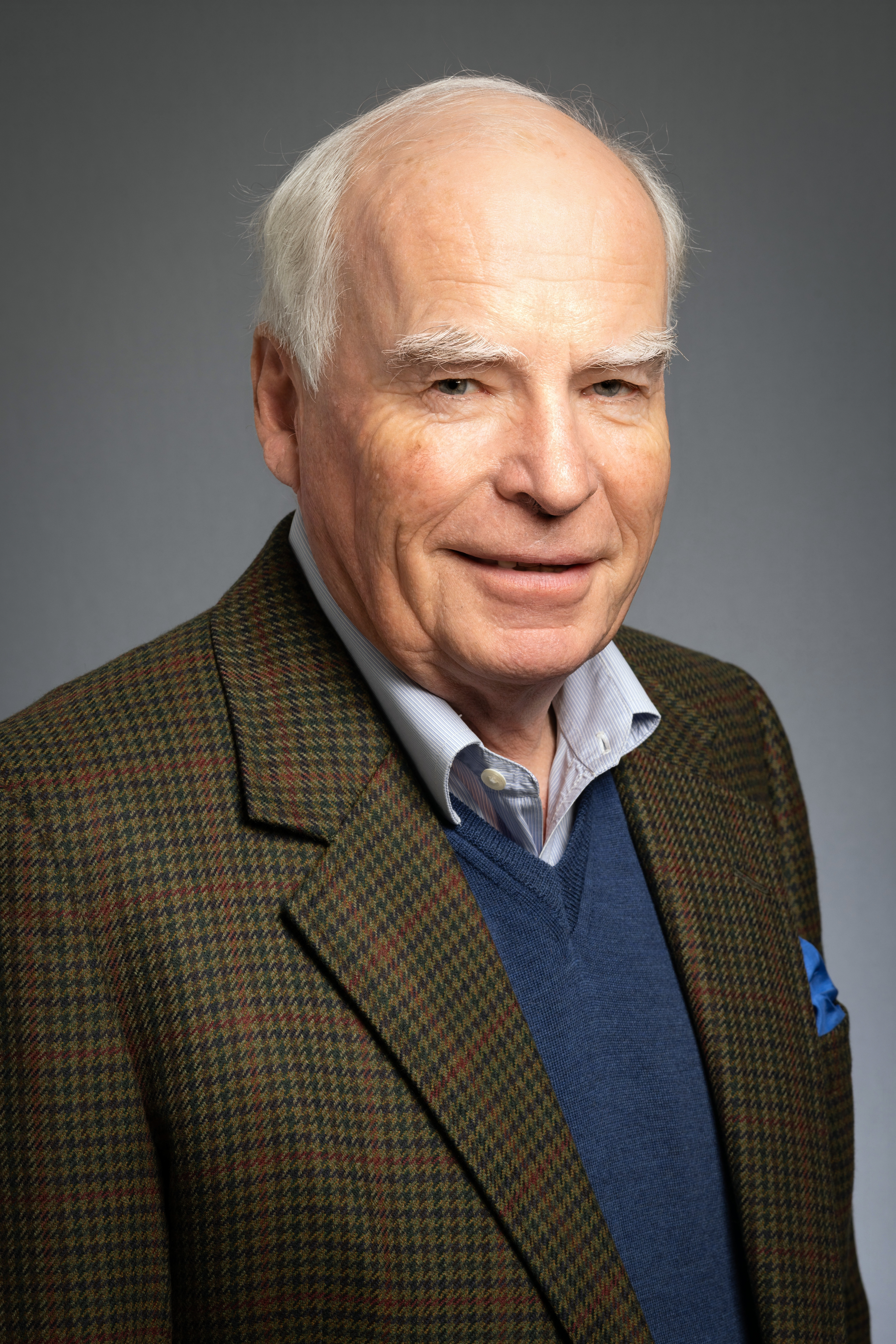
- Gerald Corbett
- Born: 7 September 1951 (age 74)
- Education: Tonbridge School; Pembroke College, Cambridge,

Gerald Michael Nolan Corbett (born 7 September 1951) is a retired businessman who was the chairman of the Marylebone Cricket Club (MCC) between 2015-2021. Over his career he has been a director of thirteen public companies, seven of which he has chaired. He was chairman of Segro plc, the FTSE 100 international industrial property logistics group between 2016-22. He chaired Britvic plc for 12 years until September 2017. As chairman he led the flotation of Britvic in 2005. He was chairman of Betfair between 2012 and 2016 when Betfair merged with Paddy Power to create Paddy Power Betfair.

He had an executive career which covered many years as a finance director (he was one of the longest serving members of the 100 Group of FTSE Finance Directors) prior to his spell as chief executive of Railtrack, part of the Conservative Government's railway privatisation.

== Early career ==
Corbett attended Tonbridge School, before studying history at Pembroke College, Cambridge, where he was a foundation scholar. After this, he attended London and Harvard business schools before joining Boston Consulting Group, which advises on corporate strategy, in the mid-70s. In 1982, he joined electrical retailer Dixons, where he became group Financial Controller and Corporate Finance Director.

He left after five years to be Group Finance Director at international building materials firm Redland. In 1993, he became Group Finance Director of Grand Metropolitan, the food and drink giant.

When "Grand Met" merged with Guinness to form Diageo, in summer 1997 he left and was appointed Chief Executive of Railtrack, which he left in November 2000.

== Railtrack ==
In September 1997, three weeks after his appointment, a First Great Western express train from Swansea collided with a freight train at Southall, West London, killing seven passengers. Twenty-seven months later, in October 1999, another Intercity train collided with a commuter train near Paddington, killing 31 people. It was Britain's worst rail disaster in a decade.

Railtrack came under intense scrutiny from the regulator, Tom Winsor, who claimed Railtrack was pursuing a deliberate "culture of defiance" due to disagreements over failed punctuality improvement targets. Corbett, as chief executive of Railtrack, had a year before the crash stated that Paddington was the "best protected" station in the UK; prompting Lord Cullen - head of the public enquiry into the crash - to comment that Corbett's statement was "not only ill-considered, but ... demonstrated either a degree of complacency on the part of senior management or a desire to encourage undeserved confidence in what Railtrack had actually achieved".

A year after the Paddington crash, in October 2000, a train from London to Leeds derailed at Hatfield, resulting in four deaths. Corbett offered his resignation, which was initially rejected by the Railtrack board. Later on the same day, on the BBC news, Corbett identified the Railways problem as its fragmentation. The railway had been "ripped apart by privatisation". He urged the Government and regulators to "think the unthinkable". He left Railtrack with a compensation package estimated to be worth £1.3m in total (of which around £900,000 was his accrued pension benefit).

Corbett faced charges under the health and safety at work act over the Hatfield rail disaster but, in 2004, a high court judge dismissed them because of lack of evidence.

Corbett was personified on the London stage in David Hare's The Permanent Way and in the television film Derailed. These dramatisations showed the private tension beneath the public face and noted that Corbett had his own share of personal tragedy.

== After Railtrack ==
In March 2001, he was back at the helm of Woolworths, appointed to oversee the demerger of Woolworths Group from Kingfisher. Once the demerger was completed in August 2001, he remained on the board as chairman until 2007 when he resigned after a profits warning. The following year, Woolworths collapsed into administration.

In October 2003, he was appointed non-executive chairman of Health Club Holdings, the Holmes Place fitness clubs business, which he stepped down from the end of 2005 following his appointment as chairman of soft drinks company Britvic, to oversee its flotation in December 2005 on the London Stock Exchange.

He has also been a non-executive director of Burmah-Castrol plc and the MEPC property group.

Between 2004 and 2010, he was a non-executive director of Greencore Group plc, the Irish food company headquartered in Dublin. He was Chairman of the Governors of Abbot's Hill School between 1997 and 2002 and has been a governor of Luton University. In 2010 he served as High Sheriff of Hertfordshire

In July 2005, he was appointed as Chairman of SSL International, the company that manufactures and sells internationally Durex contraceptives and Scholl footwear and foot-care products. In the five years 2005–2010, SSL's profits trebled as the business expanded into new countries. In 2010 he negotiated the sale of SSL to Reckitt Benckiser for £2.5 billion, a gain of 400% on the share price 5 years previously.

He was chairman of Moneysupermarket.com plc between 2007 when he led the floatation until April 2014. He chaired Towry, the wealth advisory business between 2012 and 2014 and was a non-executive director of Numis plc, the stockbroking and investment banking business based in the city from 2008. He was chairman of Numis from 2014 to 2017.

He was chairman of the Hertfordshire Community Foundation and was a trustee between 2010-19. He was chairman of the St Albans Cathedral Music Trust 2010-16. He chaired the St Albans Cathedral Appeal "Alban Britains Saint First" which funded the new Welcome Centre. He was High Sheriff of Hertfordshire for 2010/11 and served on the Council of the Shrieval Association between 2008 and 2012.

He took over as Chairman of the Marylebone Cricket Club in September 2015. On the 26 September 2017 the club voted 90.5 per cent in favour of a new masterplan to develop the Lord's, their cricket ground. During his chairmanship the Warner, the Compton and the Edrich stands were rebuilt.

He became a Deputy Lieutenant of Hertfordshire in 2015.
