= John Swift (barrister) =

British barrister

John Swift KC is an English barrister and a leading authority on competition law. Born on 11 July 1940, he was called to the English bar in 1965 and took silk (became a Queen's Counsel) in 1981. He became a Bencher of the Inner Temple in 1992.

== Rail regulation ==
From 1 December 1993 until 30 November 1998, Swift was Rail Regulator and International Rail Regulator, having been appointed to those posts by Conservative politician and Secretary of State for Transport John MacGregor.

In that time, the structure of the British railway industry was radically altered in preparation for privatisation, using powers under the Railways Act 1993. The industry was privatised in the period 1995–1997.

The most controversial part of the privatisation was the June 1996 flotation on the London stock exchange of Railtrack, the owner and operator of the national railway infrastructure network. Railtrack was severely criticised for its poor stewardship of the national railway network, and some observers also criticised Swift for what some saw as an excessively light touch in regulating a company which was malfunctioning in many ways. A year after the Hatfield rail crash on 17 October 2000, caused by a broken rail, Railtrack collapsed in highly controversial circumstances which led, eventually, to the resignation as Transport Secretary of Stephen Byers, Prescott's successor.

Swift's role and behaviour were critical to the successful privatisation of Railtrack and the rest of the industry. If he had been hostile to the process, it would not have been completed.

Upon the change of British government on 2 May 1997, Swift's chances of being reappointed as Rail Regulator diminished, and when Deputy Prime Minister John Prescott MP announced at the September 1998 Labour Party conference that he intended to carry out a 'spring clean of the regulators', Swift knew his days were numbered. He was succeeded as Rail Regulator by Chris Bolt (December 1998 – July 1999) and then by Tom Winsor (July 1999 – July 2004).

Swift received no national honour or recognition for his public service as Rail Regulator, a slight which some observers deprecated as unnecessary and inappropriate, given his long and distinguished service to competition law and industry reorganisation and privatisation.

== Return to the English bar ==
Swift returned to private practice at the Bar, and became head of Monckton Chambers, a leading set of competition law chambers, until July 2001. He was in full-time practice as a member of Monckton Chambers from 1967 to 1992 and from January 1999 until July 2013.

In 2009, Swift became a panel member of the Co-operation and Competition Panel established by the Department of Health to administer the principles and rules for co-operation and competition for NHS funded services.

In April 2014, Ofgem announced Swift's appointment as the chairman of its new Enforcement Decision Panel. In its press release at the time, Ofgem said: "The Enforcement Decision Panel will bring a wealth of experience to the table and help Ofgem as we continue in our role to protect current and future consumers". In the same month, Monitor, the health service regulator, following the dissolution of the Co-operation and Competition Panel, of which Swift had been a member since 2009, continued his appointment in a new role as an expert adviser of the Board of Monitor and to its Co-operation and Competition Executive.
