= Railtrack =

British railway infrastructure owner and manager (1994–2002)

- Type: Public
- Industry: Rail transport
- Predecessor: British Rail
- Founded: 1 April 1994
- Defunct: 18 October 2002
- Fate: Renationalised
- Successor: Network Rail
- Headquarters: London, England
- Key people: John Robinson (Chairman); Gerald Corbett (CEO)

Railtrack was a group of companies that owned the track, signalling, tunnels, bridges, level crossings and most stations of the railway network in Great Britain from 1994 until 2002. It was created as part of the privatisation of British Rail, listed on the London Stock Exchange, and was a constituent of the FTSE 100 Index. In 2002, after experiencing major financial difficulty, most of Railtrack's operations were transferred to the non-departmental public body Network Rail. The remainder of Railtrack was renamed RT Group plc and eventually dissolved on 22 June 2010.

== History ==
=== Background and founding ===
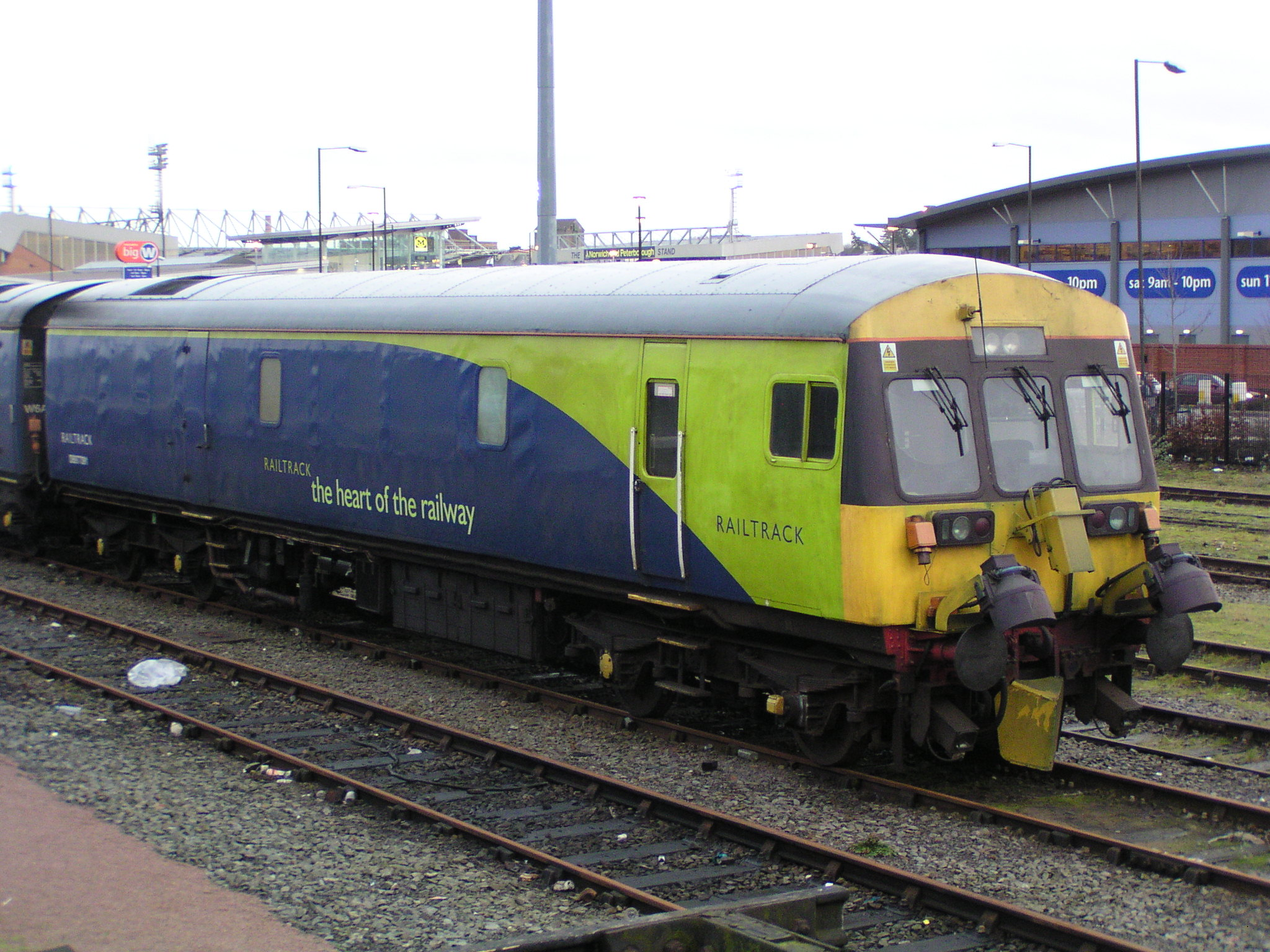
Railtrack permanent way maintenance train

During the early 1990s, the Conservative Party decided to pursue the privatisation of Britain's nationalised railway operator British Rail. A white paper released in July 1992 had called for a publicly owned company to be primarily responsible for the railway infrastructure, including the tracks, signalling, and stations, while train operations would be franchised out to various private companies. However, Robert Horton, who would become the first chairman of Railtrack and thus play a leading role through the early years of the organisation's existence, lobbied for the infrastructure-holding company to be privatised as well in order to maximise financial gains; this position was also supported by several figures within the Conservative government, such as the Chancellor of the Exchequer Kenneth Clarke and the Secretary of State for Transport Brian Mawhinney.

On 1 April 1994, in accordance with recently passed legislation, the newly established Railtrack took control of Britain's railway infrastructure from British Rail. Its primary revenue sources were the track access charges levied on train operators and the lease of stations and depots. Furthermore, the company routinely received funding from the British government; the resulting money was largely spent on the railway network in accordance with plans laid out by the rail regulator. Between its creation and late 1998, the company reportedly had a relatively calm relationship with its first economic regulator, John Swift QC, who exercised a strategy of encouraging Railtrack to make its own commitments towards improvement. According to the railway historian Christian Wolmar, the regulator had intentionally acted weak as to avoid complicating the creation and privatisation of Railtrack.

In January 1996, the British government confirmed its plans to privatise Railtrack for £2 billion with a total asset value of £4 billion. During May 1996, the company was floated on the London Stock Exchange, albeit at a lower than planned price, allegedly in response to a threatened intervention by the Labour Party. This action effectively privatised Railtrack, although the company remained closely intertwined with the British government from an operational standpoint.

Railtrack's initial operations were disrupted by an industrial dispute that largely ran between June and September 1994; at one point, the company's management proposed dismissing all of its signallers, comprising roughly 4,600 staff. Railtrack's first chief executive, John Edmonds, pursued a strategy of disposing of engineers and outsourcing their work wherever possible with the goal of reducing costs. Within its first few years of operation, Railtrack appeared to perform well financially, annual profits were recorded while its share value quadrupled within a relatively short timeframe. Furthermore, during the mid-to-late 1990s, several high-profile investment projects in cooperation with train operators and other partners were announced by the company. However, as early as 1997, Railtrack was being criticised for paying little attention to infrastructure investment.

=== Issues and controversies ===
The Southall rail crash in 1997 and the Ladbroke Grove rail crash in 1999 called into question the negative consequences that the fragmentation of the railway network had introduced to both safety and maintenance procedures. Railtrack was severely criticised for both its performance in improving Britain's railway infrastructure and for its safety record. It was observed in Lord Cullen's inquiry into the Ladbroke Grove accident that trains would have been prevented from passing any signal at red had an automatic train protection (ATP) system had been fitted and operational; however, ATP's national adoption, a recommendation made after the Clapham Junction rail crash in 1988, had been abandoned as the cost was considered to be excessive for the increase in safety.

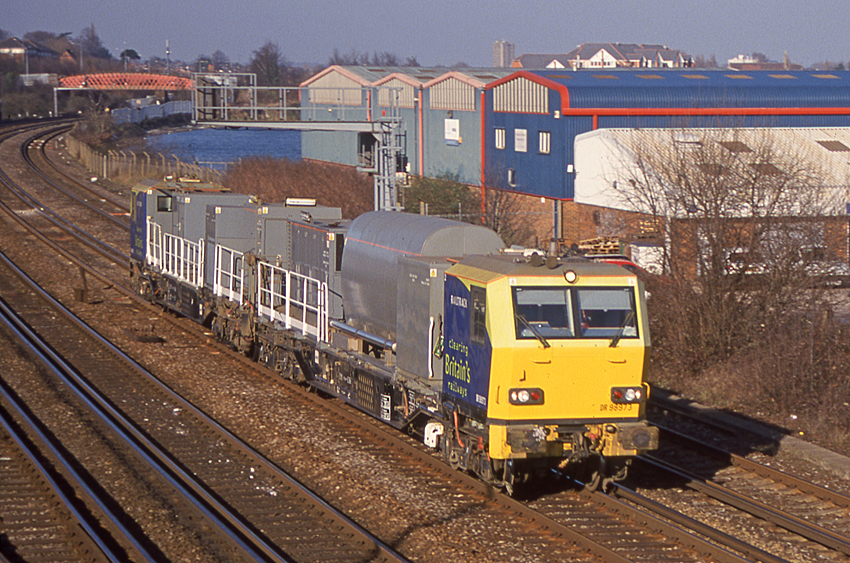
Railtrack rail cleaning train at Northam

One particular area of criticism was that the regulator was not tough enough on Railtrack and, as a result, the company had been able to abuse its monopoly position. In particular, Railtrack's customers, the passenger and freight train operators, were allegedly desperate for regulatory action to compel the company to improve its stewardship of the network and its performance. During 1993, Swift had been appointed rail regulator by the then Conservative transport secretary John MacGregor MP. When the Labour government took over after the general election in May 1997, the new transport secretary (and deputy prime minister) John Prescott took a much harder line. When Swift's five-year term of office expired on 30 November 1998, he was not reappointed.

After an interim period, during which Chris Bolt, Swift's chief economic adviser and effective deputy, filled the regulator's position, in July 1999 a new rail regulator began a five-year term, starting a much tougher regulatory era. Tom Winsor, the new rail regulator, had been Swift's general counsel (1993–95), and adopted a more interventionist and aggressive regulatory approach. The relationship between the two parties was reportedly stormy at times; in April 2000, it was reported in The Guardian that "Railtrack is adopting a deliberate 'culture of defiance' against the rail regulator". Gerald Corbett, Railtrack's chief executive at the time, and Winsor did not share the same vision for the network. Railtrack resisted regulatory action to improve its performance, and as the regulator probed ever more deeply, serious shortcomings in the company's stewardship of the network were revealed. Winsor informed Railtrack that if it did not improve passenger train performance by 12.7 per cent by March 2000, the company would have to pay fines out of its profits.

On 17 October 2000, the Hatfield rail crash occurred; this would prove to be the defining moment in Railtrack's subsequent collapse. The cause of the fatal accident was quickly determined to be an infrastructure-related failure, and thus within Railtrack's remit. In Hatfield's aftermath, major repairs were undertaken across the whole British rail network which were estimated to have cost in the order of £580 million. Railtrack had no idea how many potential Hatfields were waiting to happen, nor did they have any way of assessing the consequence of the speed restrictions they were ordering, largely because the majority of the engineering skill of British Rail had been sold off into separate maintenance and renewal companies. These restrictions brought the railway network to an almost total standstill and drew significant public ire. According to Wolmar, the Railtrack board had panicked in the wake of Hatfield.

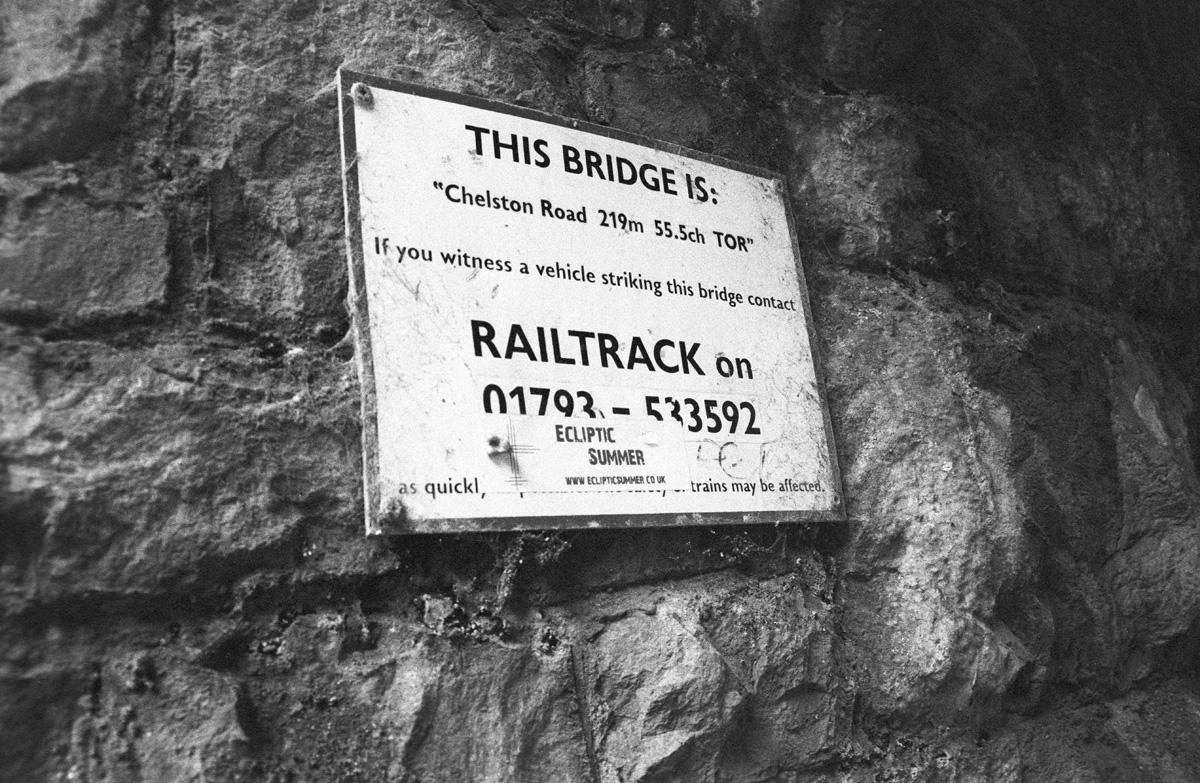
A sign identifying a bridge maintained by Railtrack

Around this time, regulatory and customer pressure on Railtrack audibly increased while the company's share price fell sharply as it became apparent that there were serious shortcomings in the company's ability to tackle and solve fundamental problems with its core activities. During February 1999, a significant fall in Railtrack's share price occurred in response to the company's launch of a bond issue intended to finance the West Coast Main Line modernisation and Thameslink Programmes. The modernisation of the West Coast Main Line had suffered from spiralling costs, rising from an estimated £2 billion to roughly £10 billion. The modernisation programme had failures that were technical as well as managerial, such as the moving block signalling apparatus being immature for such a busy mixed-traffic mainline. In 2000, reports emerged that Railtrack might not be able to go through with its planned commitment to purchase section 2 of High Speed 1, resulting in disruption and uncertainty for that programme as well.

In February 2001, Steve Marshall, the company's chairman, stated that Railtrack could have a net debt of approximately £8 billion by 2003. During May 2001, Railtrack announced that, despite making a pre-tax profits before exceptional expenses of £199m, the £733m of costs and compensation paid out over the Hatfield crash plunged Railtrack from profit to a loss of £534m. This loss compelled the organisation to approach the government for funding, which it controversially used to pay a £137m dividend to its shareholders in May 2001. Months later, Railtrack sought another bailout from the government.

=== Administration ===
On 7 October 2001, Railtrack plc was placed into railway administration under the Railways Act 1993, following an application to the High Court by the then Transport Secretary, Stephen Byers. This was effectively a form of bankruptcy protection that allowed the railway network to continue operating despite the financial problems of the operator. The parent company, Railtrack Group plc, was not put into administration and continued operating its other subsidiaries, which included property and telecommunications interests. If this action had not been taken, rail services throughout Britain might have entirely stopped for a time.

For most of the year in administration, the government's position had been that the new company would have to live within the existing regulatory settlement (£14.8 billion for the five years 2001–2006). However, it soon became obvious that that was impossible, and that the aftermath of the Hatfield crash had revealed that the network required significantly more money for its operation, maintenance and renewal. It was reported on 23 November 2001, that a further £3.5 billion might be needed to keep the national railway network running, a sum disputed by Ernst & Young, the administrators. During February 2002, the European Commission approved the provision of state aid to the ailing Railtrack in order to maintain operations.

To get Railtrack out of administration, the government had to go back to the High Court and present evidence that the company was no longer insolvent. The principal reason given by the government to the court for this assertion was the decision of the rail regulator – announced on 22 September 2002 – to carry out an interim review of the company's finances, with the potential to advance significant additional sums to the company. The High Court accepted that the company was not therefore insolvent, and the railway administration order was discharged on 2 October 2002.

=== Transfer of assets to Network Rail ===
Network Rail was formed with the principal purpose of acquiring and owning Railtrack plc. Originally the Government allowed private companies to bid for Railtrack plc. However, with limited availability of financial data on Railtrack, the political implications of owning the company and the very obvious preference of the government that the national railway network should go to Network Rail, no bidders apart from Network Rail were forthcoming, and Network Rail bought Railtrack plc on 3 October 2002. Railtrack plc was subsequently renamed to Network Rail Infrastructure Limited.

Network Rail's acquisition of Railtrack plc was welcomed at the time by groups that represented British train passengers. The attitude of Railtrack's customers – the passenger- and freight-train operators – was much more cautious, especially as they were wary of a corporate structure under which shareholders' equity was not at risk if the company's new management mis-managed its affairs.

=== Liquidation ===
On 18 October 2002, Railtrack's parent company, Railtrack Group, was placed into members' voluntary liquidation as RT Group. The Railtrack business (and its £7 billion debt) had been sold to Network Rail for £500 million, and the various diversified businesses it had created to seek to protect itself from the loss-making business of running a railway were disposed of to various buyers. £370 million held by Railtrack Group was frozen at the time the company went into administration and was earmarked to pay Railtrack shareholders an estimated 70p a share in compensation. The Group's interest in the partially built High Speed 1 line was also sold for £295m. During December 2002, Railtrack Group was delisted from the London Stock Exchange; that same month, the company announced an agreement to sell its remaining property interests, RT Group Developments, to the property developer Hammerson in exchange for £63 million.

== Compensation ==
=== Litigation ===
In late 2001, Railtrack shareholders formed two groups to press for increased compensation. A lawyer speaking for one of those groups remarked on GMTV that his strategy was to sue the government for incorrect and misleading information given at the time Railtrack was created, when John Major was Conservative Prime Minister. An increased offer of up to 262p per share was enough to convince the larger shareholder group, the Railtrack Action Group, to abandon legal action. The chairman, Usman Mahmud, believed that legal action would not be successful without the support of management and major shareholders.

The legality of the decision to put Railtrack into railway administration was challenged by the smaller Railtrack Private Shareholders Action Group. Their action against the government alleged that the Secretary of State for Transport at the time – Stephen Byers MP – had, by deciding to cut off funding for Railtrack and asking the High Court to put the company into railway administration, committed the common law tort of misfeasance in public office. It is believed that there was £532 million available to Railtrack comprising £370 million in the bank, along with £162 million of an existing Department of Transport loan facility still available to be drawn down, but Stephen Byers MP cancelled this facility, causing shareholders to believe that he had broken the loan agreement.

This was the largest class action ever conducted in the English courts – there were 49,500 claimants, all small shareholders in Railtrack. Keith Rowley, QC, the barrister for the shareholders, alleged Byers had "devised a scheme by which he intended to injure the shareholders of Railtrack Group by impairing the value of their interests in that company without paying compensation and without the approval of Parliament".

The case was heard in the High Court in London in July 2005; some embarrassment was caused to Byers when he admitted that an answer he had given to a House of Commons Select Committee was inaccurate, but on 14 October 2005 the judge found that there was no evidence that Byers had committed the tort of misfeasance in public office. The private shareholders decided not to appeal against the judgment because there were no legal grounds for doing so. For many of them – who had contributed around £50 each, on average, to the fighting fund to bring the action – the case had served its purpose.

The circumstances in which Railtrack had been put into administration were highly controversial, with allegations in Parliament on 24 October 2005 that the company had not been insolvent at the time (7 October 2001) and therefore that the administration order had been wrongly obtained. This was because of the jurisdiction of the independent rail regulator – at the time Tom Winsor – to provide additional money to maintain the company's financial position. Sir Alan Duncan MP, then the shadow transport secretary, said in Parliament that this aspect of the affair – which was not dealt with in the shareholders' case in the High Court – was "perhaps the most shameful scar on the Government's honesty" and "an absolute scandal".

Byers apologised in the House of Commons on 17 October 2005 for having given a "factually inaccurate" reply to the Select Committee but said that he had not intended to mislead them. This personal statement to Parliament was not accepted by the MP who had asked the original question, and the matter was remitted to the House of Commons Standards and Privileges Committee for investigation. As a result of that committee's report, Mr Byers made another statement of apology to Parliament.

=== Payments to shareholders ===
RT Group plc (in voluntary liquidation) made a number of payments to shareholders during the winding up of the company's affairs before finally being dissolved on 22 June 2010.

December 2003	200p
August 2004	43p
December 2004	9p
December 2005	8.5p
March 2010	2.071865p

== Management ==
Robert Horton was the first chairman of Railtrack; he resigned from this role in early 1999 amid reports of disagreements between Horton and the company's then-chief executive Gerald Corbett. Steve Marshall became the company's next chairman; following the company's entering into receivership, he announced his own resignation in October 2001 and actually stood down in March 2002. That same month, Geoffrey Howe was appointed chairman of Railtrack Group (the part of the business not in administration) and quickly pursued a strategy of seeking compensation from the British government.

Railtrack's first Chief Executive, John Edmonds, was a keen proponent of outsourcing the company's engineering activities and driving down costs. During late 1997, Gerald Corbett succeeded Edmonds as chief executive. During his tenure, numerous accidents occurred; Corbett issued multiple apologies and issued recommendations for reforms of the rail industry. In November 2000, Corbett submitted his resignation, having been publicly called on to do so by multiple politicians and public figures. Corbett was Railtrack's chief executive as it went into receivership.

== See also ==
- History of rail transport in Great Britain 1995 to date
- Impact of the privatisation of British Rail
- Tom Winsor § Rail Regulator 1999–2004
