= White etching cracks =

Deformation mechanism in steel

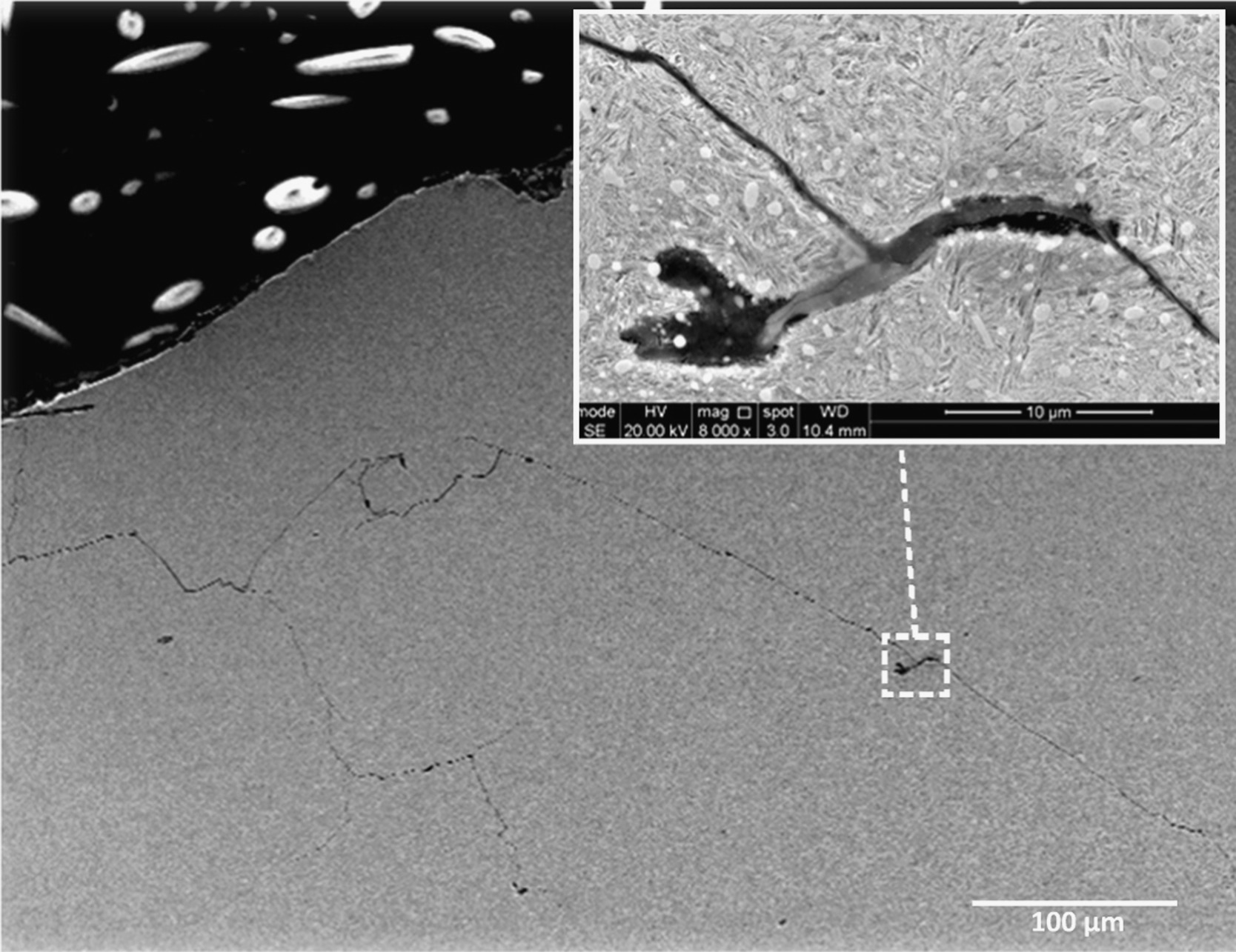
WEC initiation at MnS inclusions in steel

White etching cracks (WEC), or white structure flaking or brittle flaking, is a type of rolling contact fatigue (RCF) damage that can occur in bearing steels under certain conditions, such as hydrogen embrittlement, high stress, inadequate lubrication, and high temperature. WEC is characterised by the presence of white areas of microstructural alteration in the material, which can lead to the formation of small cracks that can grow and propagate over time, eventually leading to premature failure of the bearing. WEC has been observed in a variety of applications, including wind turbine gearboxes, automotive engines, and other heavy machinery. The exact mechanism of WEC formation is still a subject of research, but it is believed to be related to a combination of microstructural changes, such as phase transformations and grain boundary degradation, and cyclic loading.

== Cause ==
White etching cracks (WECs), first reported in 1996, are cracks that can form in the microstructure of bearing steel, leading to the development of a network of branched white cracks. They are usually observed in bearings that have failed due to rolling contact fatigue or accelerated rolling contact fatigue. These cracks can significantly shorten the reliability and operating life of bearings, both in the wind power industry and in several industrial applications.

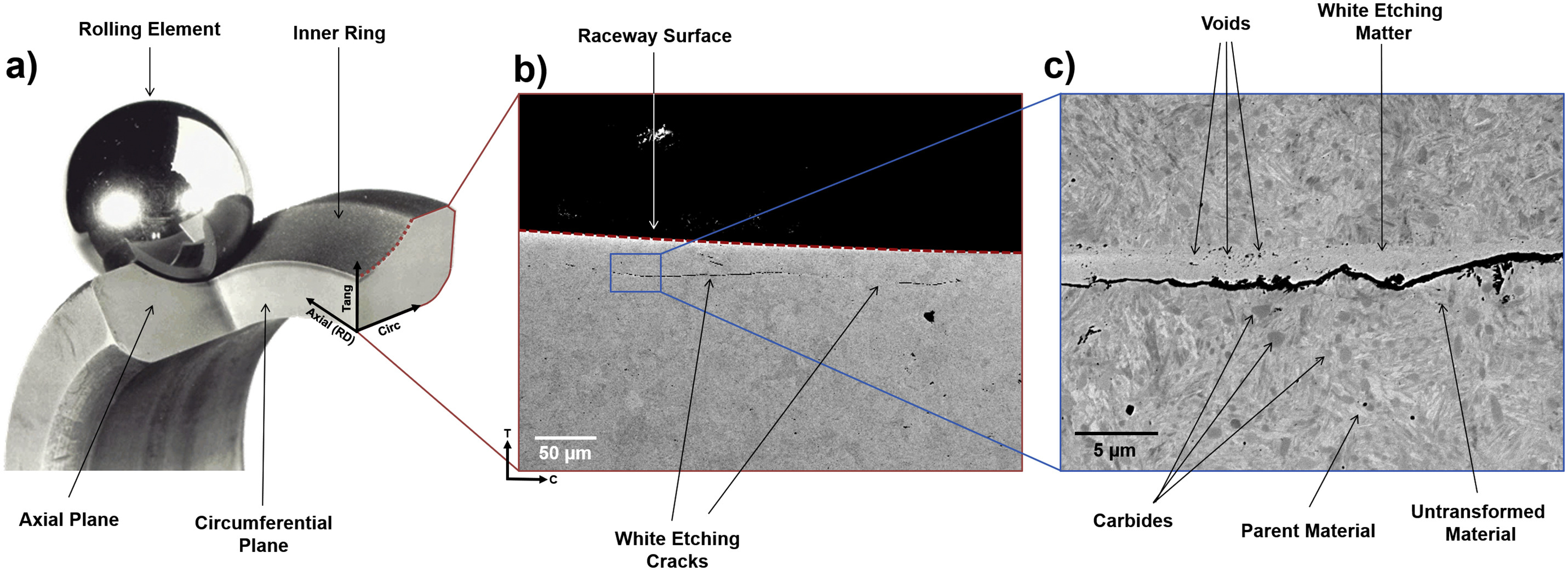
On overview of bearing components, the location, and appearance of a white etching crack (WEC): a) Schematic representation of a standard deep groove ball bearing; b) A low-magnification image using secondary electrons (SE) showcasing a WEC located beneath the surface in a bearing inner ring; c) A higher-magnification image using backscattered electrons (BSE) of the area emphasized in b), displaying the characteristic appearance of a WEC.

The exact cause of WECs and their significance in rolling bearing failures have been the subject of much research and discussion. Ultimately, the formation of WECs appears to be influenced by a complex interplay between material, mechanical, and chemical factors, including hydrogen embrittlement, high stresses from sliding contact, inclusions, electrical currents, and temperature. They all also have all been identified as potential drivers of WECs.

=== Hydrogen embrittlement ===
One of the most commonly quoted potential causes of WECs is hydrogen embrittlement caused by an unstable equilibrium between material, mechanical, and chemical aspects, which occurs when hydrogen atoms diffuse into the bearing steel, causing micro-cracks to form. Hydrogen can come from a variety of sources, including the hydrocarbon lubricant or water contamination, and it is often used in laboratory tests to reproduce WECs. Mechanisms behind the generation of hydrogen from lubricants was attributed to three primary factors contributing: decomposition of lubricants through catalytic reactions with a fresh metal surface, breakage of molecular chains within the lubricant due to shear on the sliding surface, and thermal decomposition of lubricants caused by heat generation during sliding. Hydrogen generation is influenced by lubricity, wear width, and the catalytic reaction of a fresh metal surface.

=== Stress localisation ===
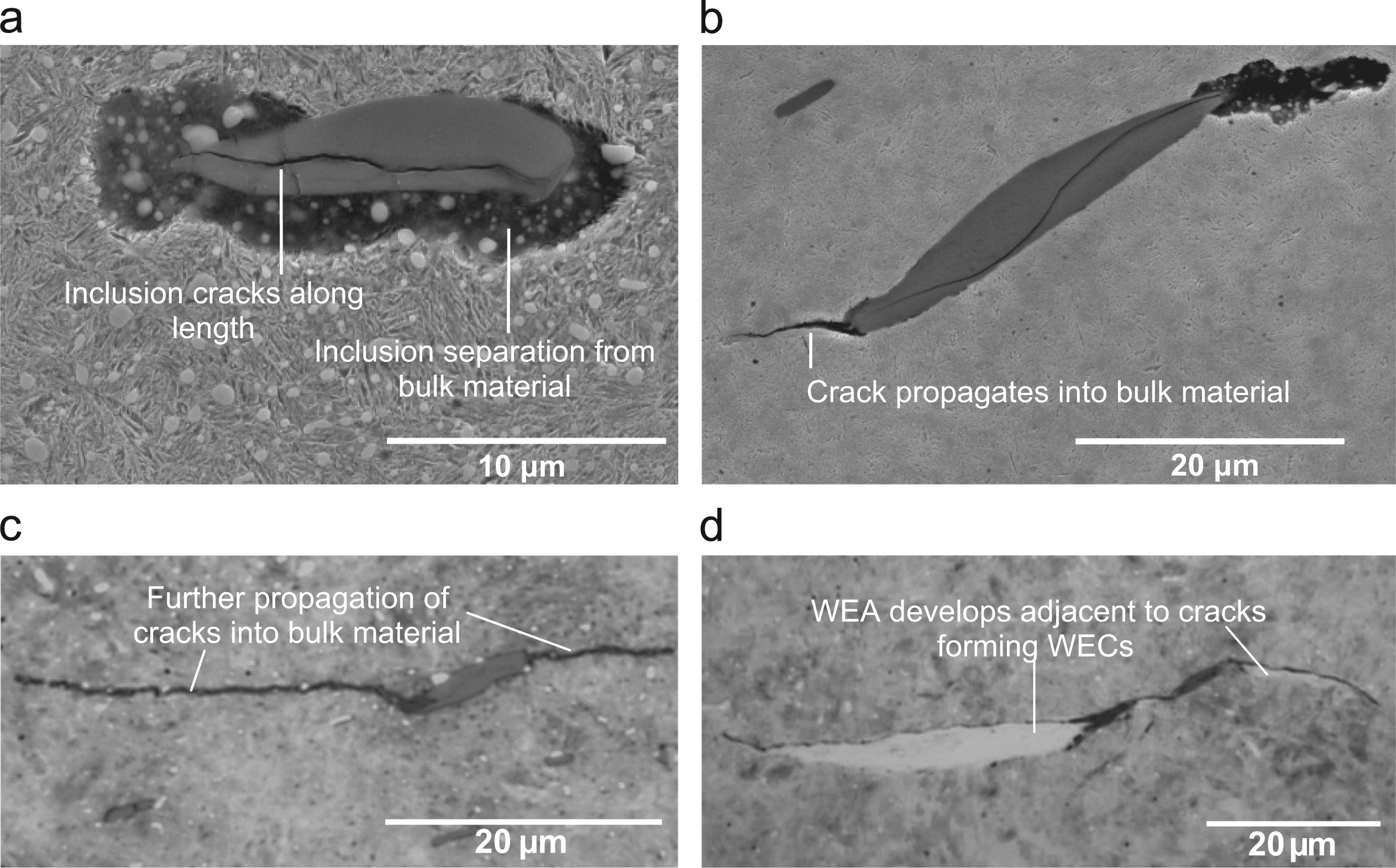
WEC initiation at MnS inclusions.

Stresses higher than anticipated can also accelerate rolling contact fatigue, which is a known precursor to WECs. WECs commence at subsurface during the initial phases of their formation, particularly at non-metallic inclusions. As the sliding contact period extended, these cracks extended from the subsurface region to the contact surface, ultimately leading to flaking. Furthermore, there was an observable rise in the extent of microstructural modifications near the cracks, suggesting that the presence of the crack is a precursor to these alterations.

The direction of sliding on the bearing surface played a significant role in WEC formation. When the traction force opposed the direction of over-rolling (referred to as negative sliding), it consistently led to the development of WECs. Conversely, when the traction force aligned with the over-rolling direction (positive sliding), WECs did not manifest. The magnitude of sliding exerted a dominant influence on WEC formation. Tests conducted at a sliding-to-rolling ratio (SRR) of -30% consistently resulted in the generation of WECs, while no WECs were observed in tests at -5% SRR. Furthermore, the number of WECs appeared to correlate with variations in contact severity, including changes in surface roughness, rolling speed, and lubricant temperature.

=== Electrical current ===
One of the primary causes of WECs is the passage of electrical current through the bearings. Both Alternating Current (AC) and Direct Current (DC) can lead to the formation of WECs, albeit through slightly different mechanisms. In general, hydrogen generation from lubricants can be accelerated by electric current, potentially accelerating WEC formation. Under certain conditions, when the current densities are low (less than 1 mA/mm2), electrical discharges can significantly shorten the lifespan of bearings by causing WECs. These WECs can develop in under 50 hours due to electrical discharges. Electrostatic sensors prove to be useful in detecting these critical discharges early on, which are associated with failures induced by WECs. The analysis revealed that different reaction layers form in the examined areas, depending on the electrical polarity.

In the case of AC, the rapid change in polarity involves the creation of a plasma channel through the lubricant film in the bearing, leading to a momentary, intense discharge of energy. The localised heating and rapid cooling associated with these discharges can cause changes in the microstructure of the steel, leading to the formation of WEAs and WECs.

On the other hand, DC can cause a steady flow of electrons through the bearing. This can lead to the electrochemical dissolution of the metal, a process known as fretting corrosion. The constant flow of current can also cause local heating, leading to thermal gradients within the bearing material. These gradients can cause stresses that lead to the formation of WECs.

== Microstructure ==
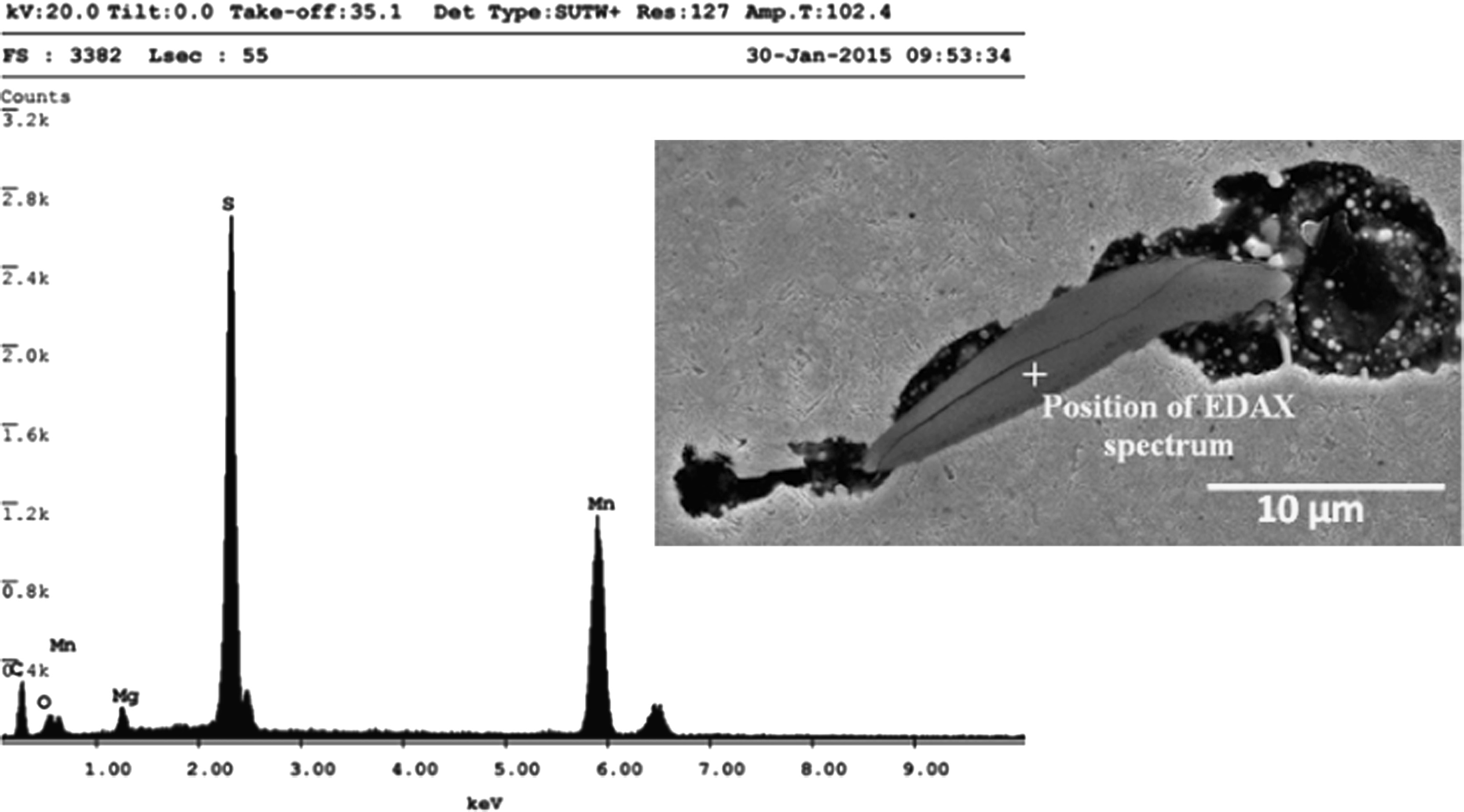
EDAX spectrum showing the chemical composition of MnS inclusion.

WECs are sub-surface white cracks networks within local microstructural changes that are characterised by a changed microstructure known as white etching area (WEA). The term "white etching" refers to the white appearance of the altered microstructure of a polished and etched steel sample in the affected areas. The WEA is formed by amorphisation (phase transformation) of the martensitic microstructure due to friction at the crack faces during over-rolling, and these areas appear white under an optical microscope due to their low-etching response to the etchant. The microstructure of WECs consists of ultra-fine, nano-crystalline, carbide-free ferrite, or ferrite with a very fine distribution of carbide particles that exhibits a high degree of crystallographic misorientation.

WEC propagation is mostly transgranular and does not follow a certain cleavage plane.

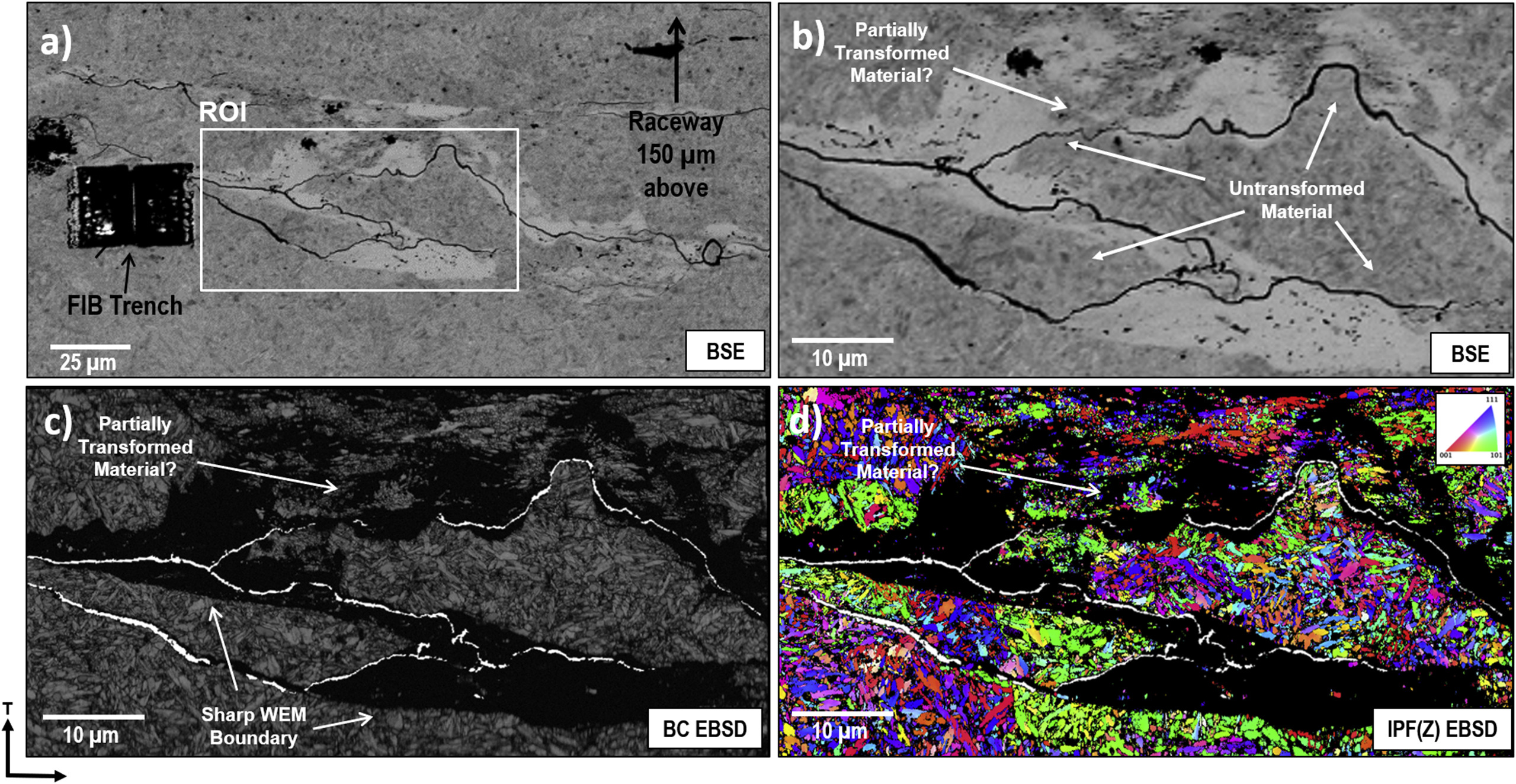
Electron microscopy analysis of an axial cross-section (rolling direction in/out of the page) approximately 200 μm below the raceway surface: a) BSE image of the WEC selected for further investigation with EBSD. b) Higher magnification BSE image of the ROI with the WEM and untransformed material highlighted; c) BC EBSD map of the ROI. d) IPF Z orientation map of the ROI. The crack, which, like the WEM, is also a non-indexing feature, was segmented from the BSE images and overlaid in white.

Researchers observed three distinct types of microstructural alterations near the generated cracks: uniform white etching areas (WEAs), thin elongated regions of dark etching areas (DEA), and mixed regions comprising both light and dark etching areas with some misshaped carbides. During repeated stress cycles, the position of the crack constantly shifts, leaving behind an area of intense plastic deformation composed of ferritic, martensite, austenite (due to austenitization) and carbides. nano-grains, i.e., WEAs. The microscopic displacement of the crack plane in a single stress cycle accumulates to form micron-sized WEAs during repeated stress cycles. After the initial development of a fatigue crack around inclusions, the faces of the crack rub against each other during cycles of compressive stress. This results in the creation of WEAs through localised intense plastic deformation. It also causes partial bonding of the opposing crack faces and material transfer between them. Consequently, the WEC reopens at a slightly different location compared to its previous position during the release of stress.

Furthermore, it has been acknowledged that WEA is one of the phases that arise from different processes and is generally observed as a result of a phase transformation in rolling contact fatigue. WEA is harder than the matrix and . Additionally, WECs are caused by stresses higher than anticipated and occur due to bearing rolling contact fatigue as well as accelerated rolling contact fatigue.

WECs in bearings are accompanied with a white etching matter (WEM). WEM forms asymmetrically along WECs. There is no significant microstructural differences between the untransformed material adjacent to cracking and the parent material although WEM exhibits variable carbon content and increased hardness compared to the parent material. A study in 2019 suggests that WEM may initiate ahead of the crack, challenging the conventional crack-rubbing mechanism.

== Testing for WEC ==
Triple disc rolling contact fatigue (RCF) Rig is a specialised testing apparatus used in the field of tribology and materials science to evaluate the fatigue resistance and durability of materials subjected to rolling contact. This rig is designed for simulating the conditions encountered in various mechanical systems, such as rolling bearings, gears, and other components exposed to repeated rolling and sliding motions. The rig typically consists of three discs or rollers arranged in a specific configuration. These discs can represent the interacting components of interest, such as a rolling bearing. The rig also allows precise control over the loading conditions, including the magnitude of the load, contact pressure, and contact geometry.

PCS Instruments Micro-pitting Rig (MPR) is a specialised testing instrument used in the field of tribology and mechanical engineering to study micro-pitting, a type of surface damage that occurs in lubricated rolling and sliding contact systems. The MPR is designed to simulate real-world operating conditions by subjecting test specimens, often gears or rolling bearings, to controlled rolling and sliding contact under lubricated conditions.

== Impact ==
Offshore wind turbines are subject to challenging environmental conditions, including corrosive saltwater, high wind forces, and potential electrical currents. These conditions can contribute to bearing failures and impact the reliability and maintenance of wind turbines. Several factors that can lead to bearing failures, such as corrosion, fatigue, wear, improper lubrication, high electric currents, and the need for improved materials and designs to ensure the longevity and performance of bearings in offshore wind turbines. WECs negatively affects the reliability of bearings, not only in the wind industry but also in various other industrial applications such as electric motors, paper machines, industrial gearboxes, pumps, ship propulsion systems, and the automotive sector. 60% of wind turbines failures are linked to WEC.

In October 2018, a workshop on WECs was organised in Düsseldorf by a junior research group funded by the German Federal Ministry of Education and Research (BMBF). Representatives from academia and industry gathered to discuss the mechanisms behind WEC formation in wind turbines, focusing on the fundamental material processes causing this phenomenon.
