= Steven Marshall (businessman) =

British business executive

Steven Marshall (11 February 1957 – 28 September 2017) was a British business executive. He studied accountancy and worked in finance at several companies before taking a leading role at Thorn plc in the 1990s. Marshall was finance director of Railtrack and then chief executive from November 2000 (in the aftermath of the Hatfield rail crash) until the company was forced into administration in October 2001. He was later chairman of Balfour Beatty and Wincanton plc.
