= Ronnie Flanagan =

Chief Constable of Northern Ireland, later a Chief Inspector of Constabulary

Sir Ronnie Flanagan GBE QPM

HM Chief Inspector of Constabulary
- In office 2005–2008

HM Inspector of Constabulary
- In office 2002–2005

Chief Constable of the Police Service of Northern Ireland
- In office 2001–2002

Chief Constable of the Royal Ulster Constabulary
- In office 1996–2001

Personal details
- Born: Ronald Flanagan; 25 March 1949 (age 77) Belfast, Northern Ireland

Sir Ronald Flanagan (born 25 March 1949) is a retired senior Northern Irish police officer. He was the Home Office Chief Inspector of Constabulary for the United Kingdom excluding Scotland. Flanagan was previously the Chief Constable of the Police Service of Northern Ireland (PSNI) since its creation in 2001 to 2002, and had been Chief Constable of its predecessor, the Royal Ulster Constabulary (RUC) until 2001.

== Career ==
Born in Belfast, Flanagan joined the Royal Ulster Constabulary (RUC) in 1970 while studying physics at The Queen's University of Belfast. He served his first three years in the Queen Street Barracks before achieving the rank of sergeant and transferring to the Castlereagh station. He was promoted to Inspector in 1976. In 1982, he became a Detective Inspector in the Special Branch and was promoted the following year to Chief Inspector.

In 1990, he took on the role of Chief Superintendent and transferred to the Police Staff College in Bramshill where he was the First Director of the Intermediate Command Course, progressing to the Senior Command Course.

In 1992, he returned to duty with the RUC as Assistant Chief Constable of Operations, later taking on the responsibilities of Operational Commander for Belfast. He was appointed as head of Special Branch in 1994 and was promoted to Acting Deputy Chief Constable the year after. He became the Deputy Chief Constable proper in 1996, and when Chief Constable Hugh Annesley retired later that year, Flanagan succeeded him. When the PSNI was established in 2001, he served as Chief Constable until his retirement the following year. He was replaced by Hugh Orde.

Since then, he has served in Her Majesty's Inspectorate of Constabulary and was appointed as HM Chief Inspector of Constabulary in 2005. He was tasked to review the police arrangements in Iraq in December 2005 as part of the British involvement there. Following his retirement in December 2008, Denis O'Connor succeeded him as Her Majesty's Acting Chief Inspector of Constabulary.

After leaving British policing, Flanagan took up the post of strategic adviser to the Abu Dhabi Police Force, a post he held for almost two years until he succeeded Lord Condon as chairman of the International Cricket Council's Anti-Corruption & Security Unit (ACSU).

=== 2007 Police Ombudsman Report ===
On 22 January 2007, a report by the Police Ombudsman for Northern Ireland, Nuala O'Loan, made findings of collusion between members of the proscribed paramilitary organisation, the Ulster Volunteer Force, and officers under the command of Flanagan. The reports were acknowledged by the then Chief Constable, Sir Hugh Orde, who apologised for the wrongdoing of his officers, and by the then British Secretary of State for Northern Ireland, Peter Hain.

“While I appreciate that it cannot redress some of the tragic consequences visited upon the families of those touched by the incidents investigated in this report, I offer a whole-hearted apology for anything done or left undone." – Hugh Orde

Flanagan denied any wrongdoing or acting with any knowledge of the events in question. He agreed that these events had taken place. In the aftermath of the ombudsman's report, Irish nationalist politicians said he should be forced to resign from his job as Chief Inspector of Constabulary.

The Police Ombudsman had criticised Flanagan's role in the RUC inquiry into the Omagh Bombing of 1998, in a report published in 2001, to which his response was that he would "publicly commit suicide" if he believed her report was correct, though he later apologised for the form of words he used.

=== Appearance before the Chilcot Inquiry ===
In July 2010, Flanagan appeared before the Iraq Inquiry into the UK's role in the Iraq War. In 2005, he had conducted a review into the UK's contribution to policing reform in Iraq. As he gave evidence, Flanagan had to apologise for the number of acronyms in his report on Iraq, which was presented to the government in January 2006:

"In my view, and I would like to almost apologise for the number of acronyms in this report – but it wasn't written with a view to being read publicly. It was written for the people who invented the acronyms..."

== Honours ==

Ribbon	Description	Notes
	Order of the British Empire (GBE)	Knight Grand Cross, 2002; Officer, 1996; Civil Division
	Knight Bachelor	1999
	Queen's Police Medal (QPM)	
	Queen Elizabeth II Golden Jubilee Medal	2002; UK version
	Police Long Service and Good Conduct Medal	
	Royal Ulster Constabulary Service Medal	

Police appointments
Preceded by Hugh Annesley	Chief Constable of the Royal Ulster Constabulary; 1996–2001	Succeeded by Last incumbent
Preceded by First incumbent	Chief Constable of the Police Service of Northern Ireland; 2001–2002	Succeeded by Colin Cramphorn (acting)
Preceded by	Her Majesty's Inspector of Constabulary for London and the East Region; 2002–2005	Succeeded by Denis O'Connor
Preceded by Keith Povey	HM Chief Inspector of Constabulary for England, Wales and Northern Ireland; 2005–2008	Succeeded by Denis O'Connor (acting)
