= Denis O'Connor (police officer) =

British police officer (born 1949)

Sir Denis O'Connor CBE QPM
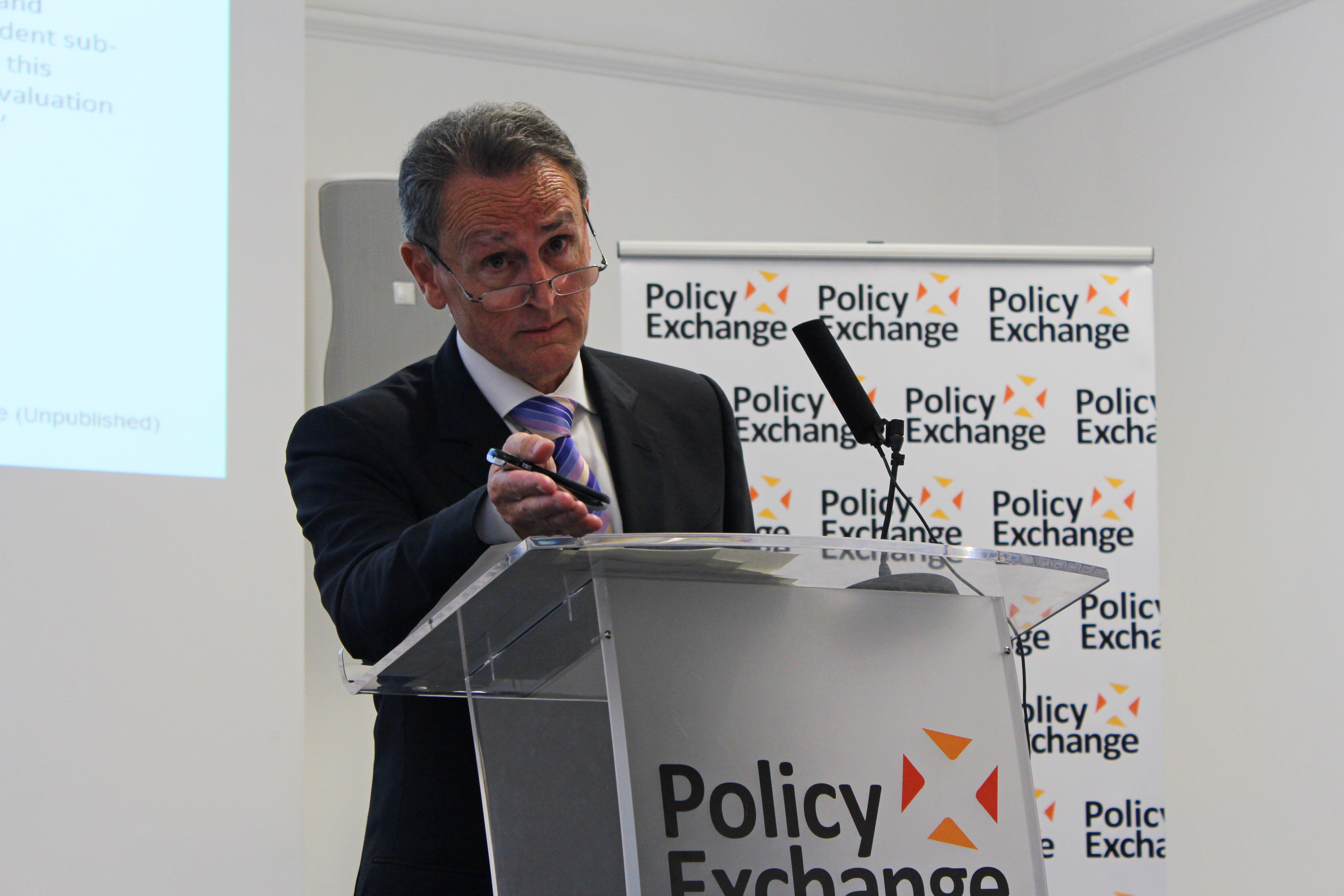
- Sir Denis O'Connor in 2012

Chief Inspector of Constabulary
- In office 11 May 2009 – 31 July 2012
- Preceded by: Sir Ronnie Flanagan
- Succeeded by: Tom Winsor

Personal details
- Born: 21 May 1949 (age 76)
- Profession: Police officer

Sir Denis Francis O'Connor CBE QPM (born 21 May 1949) is the former Chief Inspector of Constabulary. He was appointed on 11 May 2009 and retired on 31 July 2012.

== Career ==
Born in Drogheda, Ireland, O'Connor's police career began in 1968 as a constable with the Metropolitan Police. He left in 1970 to attend the University of Southampton, but rejoined the police as a graduate entrant in 1974. In 1985 he was appointed as a superintendent in Surrey Police and returned in 1988 as a chief superintendent to the Metropolitan Police Service. He rose to the rank of commander in the MPS. In 1991, he was appointed as an assistant chief constable with Surrey Police before transferring to Kent Police where he was appointed as deputy chief constable between 1993 and 1997. In 1997, he became a Metropolitan Police Assistant Commissioner and from 2000 until 2004 was appointed chief constable of Surrey Police.

From 2004, he was one of Her Majesty's Inspectors of Constabulary, and became Acting Chief Inspector on 1 December 2008. On 28 March 2012 the Home Secretary announced Sir Denis would retire on 31 July after more than three years in the role.

O'Connor is trustee of the Surrey Care Trust in Woking Surrey, which provides education, training, skills and volunteering opportunities to those who need motivation or a second chance in life. The charity also runs a fund to help those facing hardship throughout Surrey.

== Reports ==
- Adapting to Protest published 7 July 2009. This report concerned the policing of the 2009 G20 London summit protests.
- Stop the Rot, published 24 September 2010, that examined the effects of anti-social behaviour and the withdrawal of police street patrols. According to the Stop the Rot report, it confirmed the widely held belief by UK people, that the police had largely retreated from policing anti-social behaviour on the streets, by grading calls and not replying to incidents deemed to be below a specific grade of offence. The results was a rapid increase of yobbish behaviour in the last decade.

== Awards ==
He was awarded the Queen's Police Medal in 1996. He was appointed a Commander of the Order of the British Empire in 2002, and was knighted in the 2010 Birthday Honours.

Ribbon	Description	Notes
	Knight Bachelor (Kt)	2010
	Order of the British Empire (CBE)	2002; Commander; Civil Division
	Queen's Police Medal (QPM)	1996
	Queen Elizabeth II Golden Jubilee Medal	2002; UK Version of this Medal
	Queen Elizabeth II Diamond Jubilee Medal	2012; UK Version of this Medal
	Police Long Service and Good Conduct Medal	

Police appointments
Preceded by Sir Ronnie Flanagan	HM Chief Inspector of Constabulary for England, Wales and Northern Ireland; 2008–2012	Succeeded by Tom Winsor
