= Rail Regulator =

1993–2004 agency in the United Kingdom

Office of the Rail Regulator
Agency overview
- Formed: 1 December 1993; 32 years ago
- Dissolved: 4 July 2004; 22 years ago
- Superseding agency: Office of Rail Regulation
- Type: Non-ministerial government department
- Jurisdiction: United Kingdom
- Agency executive: Rail Regulator
- Key document: Railways Act 1993

The Rail Regulator was a statutory office holder, created with effect from 1 December 1993 by section 1 of the Railways Act 1993, for the independent economic regulation of the British railway industry. The Rail Regulator was in charge of an executive agency called the Office of the Rail Regulator.

The office was abolished from 4 July 2004, using powers under the Railways and Transport Safety Act 2003, when (in line with constitutional changes made to other economic regulatory authorities) the single-person regulator model was replaced by a nine-member corporate board called the Office of Rail Regulation.

Under the Railways Act 2005, the Office of Rail Regulation was later given safety jurisdiction in addition to economic regulatory functions.

== Regulators ==
The first Rail Regulator was John Swift QC, who held office from 1 December 1993 until 30 November 1998. Appointed by the Conservative Secretary of State for Transport, John MacGregor MP, Swift had little hope of being reappointed for a second five-year term by the new Labour party Secretary of State for the Environment, Transport and the Regions and Deputy Prime Minister John Prescott MP. Prescott had announced at the Labour Party conference in September 1998 that he intended to have a "spring clean of the regulators".

Because Nolan rules on the making of public appointments take months, Prescott appointed Chris Bolt, Swift's chief economic adviser, as regulator on an interim basis from 1 December 1998 on a seven-month contract, to allow him to go through the process for a full-term appointment.

Prescott's choice for regulator was Tom Winsor, a lawyer and partner in a leading City of London law firm who had shown his impatience with the poor performance of Railtrack, the owner and operator of the national railway infrastructure. Winsor held office from 5 July 1999 until 4 July 2004, during some turbulent years in British railway history. In the 2015 New Year Honours List, Winsor was knighted; the citation included the following passage: "As Rail Regulator from 1999 to 2004, he substantially reformed the [railway] industry leading to major improvements in railway performance, network integrity, industry development and passenger satisfaction".

== Jurisdiction ==
The Rail Regulator was a powerful player in the privatised British railway industry. His jurisdiction was wide in the opinion of politicians, including the first three Labour Secretaries of State for Transport—John Prescott MP, Stephen Byers MP and Alistair Darling MP—and the chairman of the House of Commons Select Committee on Transport Gwyneth Dunwoody MP.

That jurisdiction comprised:

- power to determine the financial framework of the railway industry, setting price controls for access to the national network of railway facilities (principally track and stations), through the power to determine the efficiency and activity levels necessary for the competent operation, maintenance, renewal and enhancement of the railway system
- determining the fair and efficient allocation of capacity of railway facilities, including ordering compulsory third party access, and setting standard terms for access contracts
- issue, modification, compliance monitoring and enforcement of operating licences for railway assets
- development of industry-wide codes (particularly the network code) dealing with timetable development, changes to rolling stock and the network itself, the handling of operational disruption, transfer of access rights, local accountability, information provision and environmental protection
- acting as competition authority for the railways under the Competition Act 1998
- acting as appellate body for certain regulatory and legal disputes, including in certain cases of the establishment, amendment and abolition of safety standards.

== Independence ==
Although appointed by a government minister, the Rail Regulator was independent of government. This was because, to encourage and maintain private investment in the railway industry, it was essential that decisions by the regulator were taken on objective economic criteria, free of undue political influence or considerations.

The independence of the Rail Regulator was established by virtue of:

- the absence of any ability of the Secretary of State for Transport to give him directions or orders as to what he should or should not do
- the absence of any right of appeal to the Secretary of State for Transport in relation to the actions of the Rail Regulator
- the absence of the right of the Secretary of State for Transport to remove the Rail Regulator from office, except on grounds of incapacity or misbehaviour (the same grounds as apply to judges of the High Court).

In October 2001, the independence of the Rail Regulator was threatened when the Secretary of State for Transport—Stephen Byers—took steps which led to the placing of Railtrack into railway administration. Although successfully resisted, on 15 July 2004 the government announced a legislative intention to restrict the jurisdiction of the Office of Rail Regulation. The Railways Act 2005 was passed in April of the following year.

During the final Parliamentary stages of the passage of the Railways Act 2005, the Government sustained a defeat in the House of Lords over an amendment which would have protected passenger and train operators against a diminution of infrastructure quality or performance, or being held rigidly to their contracts for the provision of railway services which assumed no such diminution, if the Secretary of State for Transport restricted funds available to Network Rail. However, the amendment was reversed the same day in the House of Commons with a much weaker provision substituted for it. The House of Lords did not insist on their original amendment, and the legislation was passed without the protections which the train operators wanted. Critics regarded this as an unjustified interference in an inter-dependent contractual matrix, contrary to the legitimate expectations of private investors in the railway.

== International Rail Regulator ==
International Rail Regulator was a statutory post in the United Kingdom created by the Railways Regulations 1998, concerned with access to the British track and signalling network by international railway traffic.

The post – previously held by each of the holders of the statutory position of Rail Regulator – was abolished in 2005 and the functions and duties of the International Rail Regulator were assumed by the Office of Rail Regulation. In the period between the abolition of the Rail Regulator in 2004 and the abolition of the International Rail Regulator in 2005, the office of International Rail Regulator was held by the Chair of the Office of Rail Regulation.
