= Great North Eastern Railway Ltd v Office of Rail Regulation =

United Kingdom enterprise law

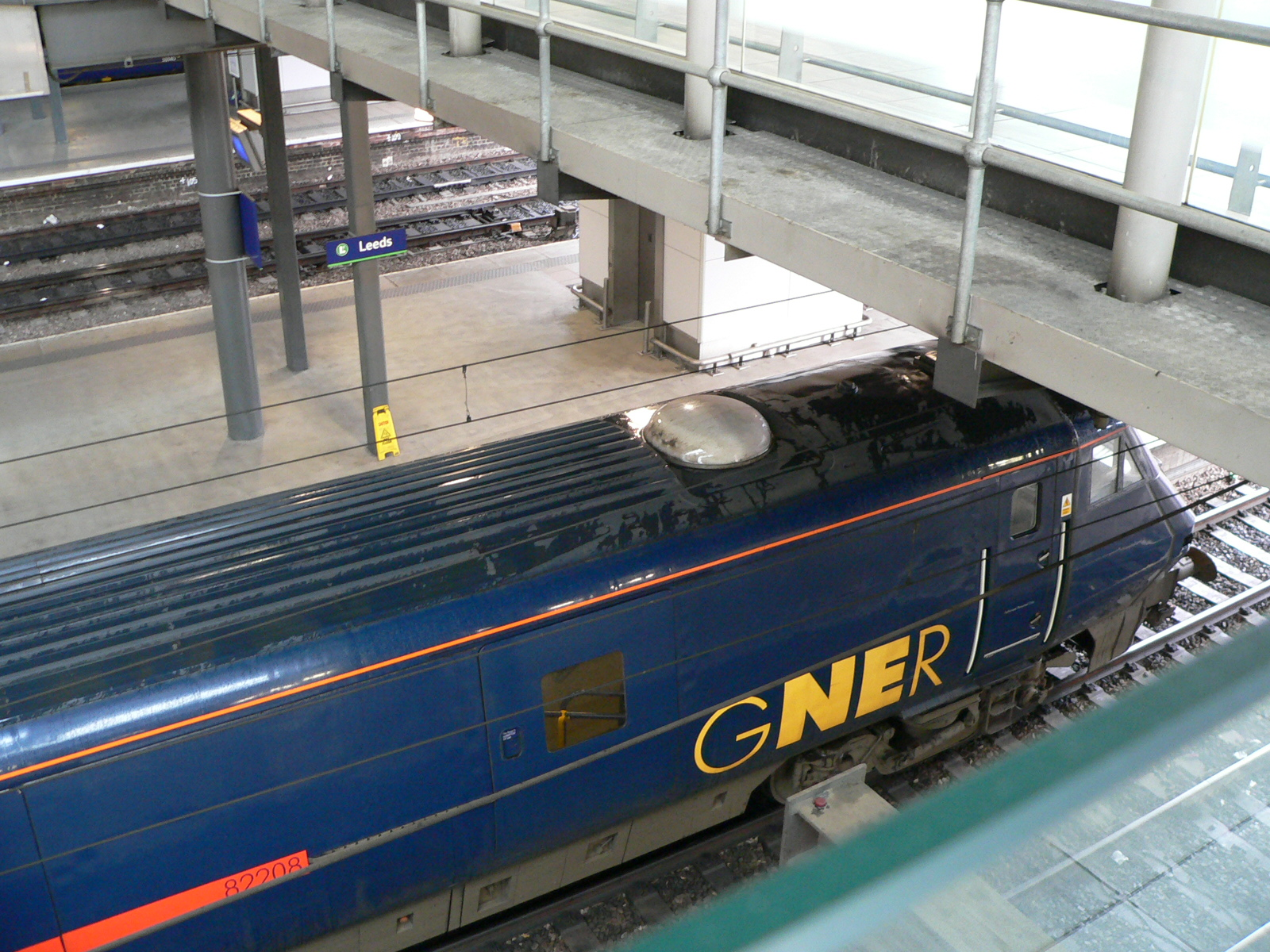
- Court: High Court of Justice
- Citation: [2006] EWHC 1942 (Admin)

Keywords
- Rail

Great North Eastern Railway Ltd v Office of Rail Regulation [2006] EWHC 1942 (Admin) is a UK enterprise law case, concerning railways in the UK.

== Facts ==
Great North Eastern Railway (GNER) claimed that the Office of Rail Regulation breached the Railways Infrastructure (Access and Management) Regulations 2005 Sch 3 para 1(1)(b) and the Railway Directive 2001/14 art 87(1) by giving it different charges on the East Coast Main Line. GNER was required to pay a fixed track charge £60.5m, which was 60% of its overall total track charges for 2005/06. Other companies with newer contracts, (First Hull Trains and Grand Central) were given a charge varying with network usage. GNER argued that they were equivalent parties, so that differences amounted to unlawful discrimination under Sch 3, para 1(1)(b), not enough to cover avoidable costs under para 1(4), and unlawful state aid.

== Judgment ==
Sullivan J held that Office of Rail Regulation’s (ORR) approach was lawful, and it had a wide discretion to manage the network in the interests of passengers and make track access agreement. Operators should be able to pay costs and encouraged to use rail infrastructure. GNER was not providing comparable services. GNER could either enter the downstream rail passenger market by tendering a competitive bid, or by seeking open access. All routes were open without discrimination, so no distortion of competition could be inferred: HJ Banks & Co Ltd v Coal Authority (2001) C-390/98. Both parties had made it plain that a fixed charge would not have been viable. Further, the court should be very slow to intervene given the ORR’s expertise in the technical field of costing. There was no breach of the Directive article 87(1). Even if this was wrong, there would be no reason to quash the decision as GNER delayed making an application to court, and there was no real unfairness.

== See also ==
- United Kingdom enterprise law
