= Towry =

Towry may refer to the following people:

- Charles Towry-Law, 3rd Baron Ellenborough (1820–1890), British member of the House of Lords
- Charles Towry-Law, 4th Baron Ellenborough (1856–1902), British member of the House of Lords, son of the 4th Baron
- George Henry Towry (1767–1809), Royal Navy officer
- Lanre Towry-Coker (born 1944), Nigerian architect, politician and socialite
- Mike Towry, American co-founder of San Diego Comic-Con
