= Chris Bolt =

British economist and civil servant

Christopher Wesley Bolt CB (born 1953) is a British economist and civil servant who was the non-executive chairman of the Office of Rail Regulation, the national economic and safety regulatory authority for Britain's railways.

== Background ==
Christopher Bolt born 1953 in Plymouth, Devon. He attended Plymouth College and Gonville and Caius College at the University of Cambridge, where he graduated with a First Class Honours in Economics in 1975. He then obtained an MSc from University College London.

He entered the Civil Service in 1975, where he worked in various economic roles, including at the Finance Ministry, Department for Transport, and Department for the Environment. Following water privatisation in 1989, he became the Head of Economic Regulation at the newly-formed Office of Water Services (Ofwat).

== Railways ==
In 1994, Bolt moved to the Office of the Rail Regulator to take up appointment as Chief Economist. Deputy Prime Minister John Prescott MP decided not to reappoint John Swift QC as Rail Regulator in 1998, so Bolt was given a seven-month contract as Rail Regulator. Prescott appointed Tom Winsor permanently to the role from 5 July 1999.

In July 1999, Bolt left the Office of the Rail Regulator and joined Transco plc, the company which owns and operates the majority of Great Britain's gas transportation system, as regulation and corporate affairs director. He was appointed to a new role of group director, regulation and public policy in Transco's parent company, Lattice Group plc, in November 2001. He left Lattice in October 2002 on completion of its merger with National Grid Group plc.

From 5 July 2004, Bolt became chairman of the Office of Rail Regulation, until succeeded by Anna Walker in July 2009.

== London Underground arbiter ==
In December 2002, Bolt was appointed Arbiter for the public-private partnership for the London Underground.

The role of PPP Arbiter was established by the Greater London Authority Act 1999 (GLA Act). The Secretary of State for Transport appointed Chris Bolt as the first PPP Arbiter for a four-year term from 31 December 2002, the date of commencement of the Tube Lines contract. This term was extended on 18 May 2006 for a further four years to December 2010.

Bolt was appointed Companion of the Order of the Bath (CB) in the 2010 New Year Honours.

== Other roles ==
Bolt was appointed chairman of the Guernsey Competition and Regulation Authority in 2020.
