= Hatfield rail crash =

2000 rail accident in Hertfordshire, England

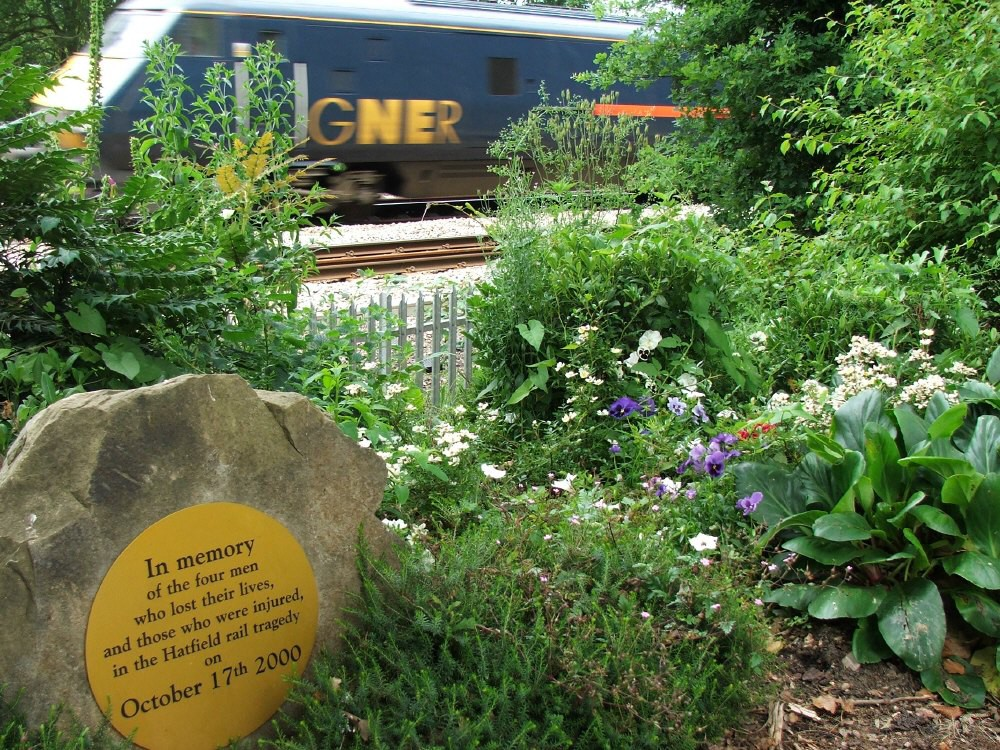
- An InterCity 225 passing a memorial garden for the crash victims

Details
- Date: 12:23, 17 October 2000
- Location: Hatfield, Hertfordshire
- Coordinates: 51°45′14″N 0°13′18″W
- Country: England
- Line: East Coast Main Line
- Operator: Great North Eastern Railway
- Cause: Broken rail

Statistics
- Trains: 1
- Passengers: 170
- Deaths: 4
- Injured: Over 70 (Note: The ORR Final Report in 2006 states "over 70" injured; news reports vary, mentioning figures up to "102 injured".)

The Hatfield rail crash was a railway accident on 17 October 2000, at Hatfield, Hertfordshire, England. It was caused by a rolling contact fatigue-induced derailment, killing four people and injuring more than 70.

The accident exposed major stewardship shortcomings of the privatised national railway infrastructure company Railtrack. Reports found there was a lack of communication and some staff were not aware of maintenance procedures. Railtrack subsequently went into administration and was replaced by Network Rail in 2002. The aftermath of the accident saw widespread speed limit reductions throughout the rail network and a tightening of health and safety procedures, the repercussions of which were still felt years later. In 2005, both Railtrack and the contractor Balfour Beatty were found guilty of breaching health and safety laws.

== Accident ==
A Great North Eastern Railway (GNER) InterCity 225 train bound for Leeds had left London King's Cross at 12:10, and was travelling along the East Coast Main Line at approximately 115 mph (185 km/h) when it derailed south of Hatfield station at 12:23. The train was in the control of an experienced driver trainer accompanied by a trainee driver. It had been agreed at Kings Cross that the trainee would drive the 12:10 service to Leeds. The primary cause of the accident was later determined to be the left-hand rail fracturing as the train passed over it.

The train travelled a further 1,000 yards (910 m) after derailment. The leading locomotive and the first two coaches remained upright and on the rails. All of the following coaches and the trailing Driving Van Trailer (DVT) were derailed, and the train set separated into three sections. The restaurant coach, the eighth vehicle in the set, overturned onto its side and struck an overhead line gantry after derailing, resulting in severe damage to the vehicle. The whole incident occurred in 17 seconds.

Four passengers died in the accident and a further 33 were initially reported as injured, three seriously. The number of injured was later revised to over 70. Those who died were all in the restaurant coach:

- Robert James Alcorn, 37, of Auckland, New Zealand
- Steve Arthur, 46, from Pease Pottage, West Sussex
- Leslie Gray, 43, of Tuxford, Nottinghamshire
- Peter Monkhouse, 50, of Headingley, Leeds

Two of those seriously injured were GNER staff working in the restaurant coach at the time of the accident. Emmerdale actress Anna Brecon was travelling on the train, and suffered minor cuts and bruises. Another passenger was the television reporter Justin Rowlatt, who said he "watched the carriages skid and whip around on the gravel besides the track".

Crash investigators found the British Rail-designed Mark 4 coaches had good structural integrity and, aside from the restaurant coach, remained intact after the accident. Coincidentally, the locomotive in the crash was also involved in the Selby rail crash (where the leading DVT hit a road vehicle on the track) four months later.

== Cause ==
A preliminary investigation found a rail had fragmented as trains passed and that the likely cause was "rolling contact fatigue" (defined as multiple surface-breaking cracks). Such cracks are caused by high loads where the wheels contact the rail. Repeated high loading causes fatigue cracks to grow. When they reach a critical size, the rail fails. Portions of the failed track at Hatfield were reassembled and numerous fatigue cracks were identified. They contributed to the spalling of the running surface to around five millimetres (0.2 in) deep and 100 millimetres (3.9 in) long.

The problem was known about before the accident; a letter from the infrastructure company Railtrack in December 1999 warned that the existing Railtrack Line Specification was insufficient to guard against this type of fatigue. Replacement rails were made available but never delivered to the correct location for installation.

Since privatisation, Railtrack had divested the engineering knowledge of British Rail to contractors. While it had comprehensive maintenance procedures that might have prevented the accident if followed appropriately, later investigation showed there were serious deficiencies in the experience and working knowledge of staff. In a subsequent interview, the Zone Quality Standards Manager said, "I do not have knowledge of railway engineering nor railway safety", which was completely contrary to the written requirements for the role. In May 1999, the Head of Track had said that insufficiently-skilled work was causing more rails to break. Railtrack did not know how many other cases of rail fatigue around the network could lead to a similar accident. It consequently imposed over 1,800 emergency speed restrictions and instigated a costly nationwide track replacement programme. The company was subject to "enforcement" by the Rail Regulator, Tom Winsor.

== Aftermath ==
In 2004, Steve Arthur's widow was awarded £1 million damages in the High Court. The families of the other three fatal casualties received damages out of court. A memorial service was held for the victims on the tenth anniversary of the crash in 2010 at St Etheldreda's Church, Hatfield. A second service was held near the crash site afterwards. Both were conducted by the Rector of Hatfield, who had attended to casualties and the bereaved in the immediate aftermath of the accident in 2000.

The speed restrictions and track replacement works caused significant disruption on a majority of the national network for more than a year. The disruption and Railtrack's spiralling costs eventually caused the company to enter administration at the insistence of Transport Secretary Stephen Byers, and its replacement in 2002 by the not-for-dividend company Network Rail under Byers's successor Alistair Darling.

Train operating companies were adversely affected by the disruption, losing an estimated 19% of revenue in the year following the crash. Freight operator EWS was cancelling up to 400 trains per week as a result, whilst estimates put Freightliner's resultant losses at £1 million per month. The cost to the entire UK economy of the disruption was estimated at £6 million per day.

The Institute of Rail Welding (IoRW) was set up in 2002 by The Welding Institute (TWI) and Network Rail as a consequence of the recommendations in the investigation report. It provides a focus for individuals and organisations involved in rail welding and facilitates the adoption of best practice.

The aftermath of the crash had long-reaching repercussions in the rail industry. In 2015, at the fifteenth anniversary of the accident, the Rail, Maritime and Transport union (RMT) said a new system for handling maintenance introduced by Network Rail was confusing, and there was the potential for a similar accident. The union's general secretary said that Network Rail needed to act on its concerns, otherwise there would be industrial action.

The Class 91 powering the train involved in the Hatfield rail crash was involved in the Selby rail crash four months later, sustaining minor damage. It was repaired again following the accident, and remained in service for a further 20 years, finally being scrapped at Sims Metals Scrapyard in Nottingham in 2021. As a result of its involvement in both accidents, it had gained the unofficial nickname 'Lucky'.

== Court case ==
In 2003, five managers and two companies – Network Rail (as successors of Railtrack) and the division of Balfour Beatty that maintained the track – were charged with manslaughter and breach of health and safety charges in connection with the accident. The managers, Anthony Walker (Balfour Beatty's rail maintenance director), Nicholas Jeffries (its civil engineer), Railtrack's Alistair Cook and Sean Fugill (asset managers for the London North-East zone), and track engineer Keith Lee, all denied the charges. The corporate manslaughter charges against Railtrack/Network Rail and some of its executives were dropped in September 2004, but the other charges stood.

The trial began in January 2005; the judge, Mr Justice Mackay, warned that it could go on for a year. On 14 July, the judge instructed the jury to acquit all defendants on charges of manslaughter. A few days later, Balfour Beatty changed its plea to guilty on the health and safety charges, and on 6 September, Network Rail was found guilty of breaching health and safety law. Network Rail were fined £3.5 million while Balfour Beatty were fined £10 million. All of the manslaughter charges against the executives were dismissed by the judge.

== See also ==
- Ladbroke Grove rail crash, an earlier accident that also led to reforms in British railway management and safety
- List of rail accidents in the United Kingdom
