= Rolling contact fatigue =

Deformation mechanism

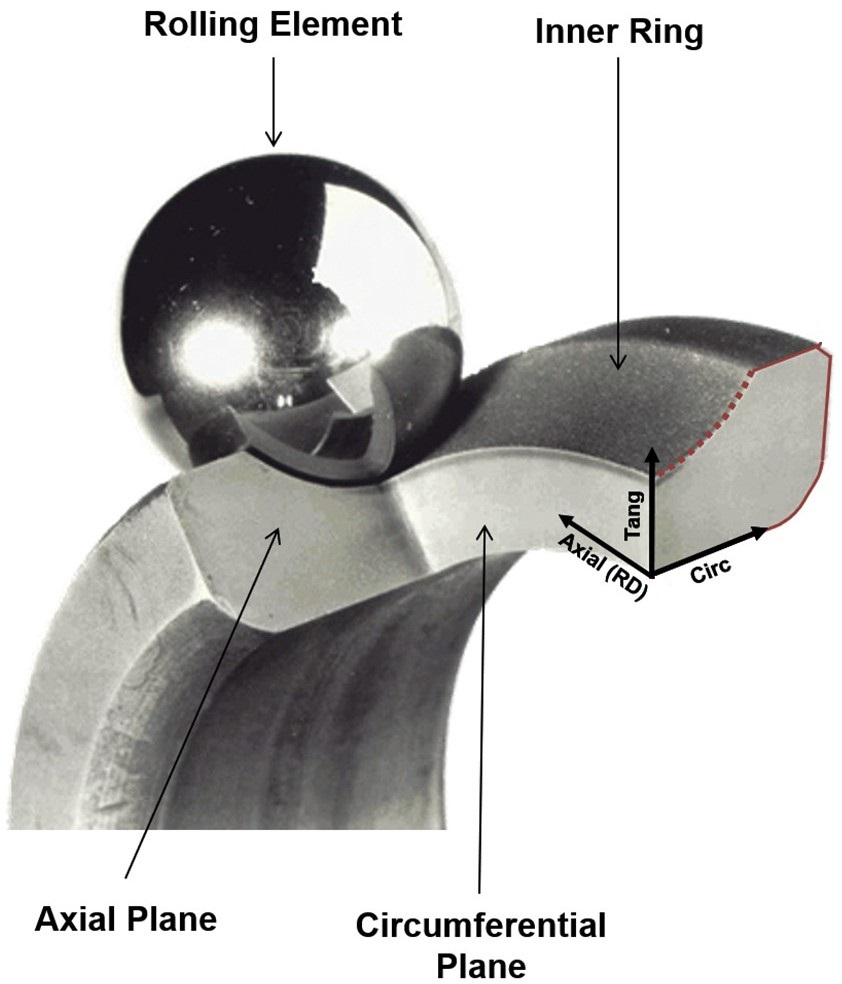
Overview of bearing components, including bearing element and inner ring

Rolling contact fatigue (RCF) is a phenomenon that occurs in mechanical components relating to rolling/sliding contact, such as railways, gears, and bearings. It is the result of the process of fatigue due to rolling/sliding contact. The RCF process begins with cyclic loading of the material, which results in fatigue damage that can be observed in crack-like flaws, like white etching cracks. These flaws can grow into larger cracks under further loading, potentially leading to fractures.

In railways, for example, when the train wheel rolls on the rail, creating a small contact patch that leads to very high contact pressure between the rail and wheel. Over time, the repeated passing of wheels with high contact pressures can cause the formation of crack-like flaws that becomes small cracks. These cracks can grow and sometimes join, leading to either surface spalling or rail break, which can cause serious accidents, including derailments.

RCF is a major concern for railways worldwide and can take various forms depending on the location of the crack and its appearance. It is also a significant cause of failure in components subjected to rolling or rolling/sliding contacts, such as rolling-contact bearings, gears, and cam/tappet arrangements. The alternating stress field in RCF can lead to material removal, varying from micro- and macro-pitting in conventional bearing steels to delamination in hybrid ceramics and overlay coatings.

== Basics ==
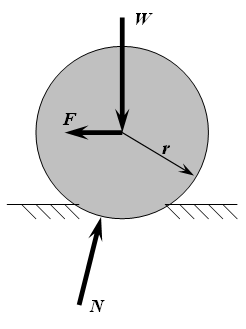
Rolling friction

In the case of bodies capable of rolling, there is a particular type of friction, in which the sliding phenomenon, typical of dynamic friction, does not occur, but there is also a force that opposes the motion, which also excludes the case of static friction. This type of friction is called rolling friction. Now we want to observe in detail what happens to a wheel that rolls on a horizontal plane. Initially the wheel is immobile and the forces acting on it are the weight force $m \vec g$ and the normal force $\vec N$ given by the response to the weight of the floor.

At this point the wheel is set in motion, causing a displacement at the point of application of the normal force which is now applied in front of the center of the wheel, at a distance $b$, which is equal to the value of the rolling friction coefficient. The opposition to the motion is caused by the separation of the normal force and the weight force at the exact moment in which the rolling starts, so the value of the torque given by the rolling friction force is
$${\vec M_\text{rf}} = \vec b \times m \vec g$$
What happens in detail at the microscopic level between the wheel and the supporting surface is described in Figure, where it is possible to observe what is the behavior of the reaction forces of the deformed plane acting on an immobile wheel.

Rolling the wheel continuously causes imperceptible deformations of the plane and, once passed to a subsequent point, the plane returns to its initial state. In the compression phase the plane opposes the motion of the wheel, while in the decompression phase it provides a positive contribution to the motion.

The force of rolling friction depends, therefore, on the small deformations suffered by the supporting surface and by the wheel itself, and can be expressed as $\vert\vec F_ {r}\vert = b \vert\vec N\vert$, where it is possible to express $b$ in relation to the sliding friction coefficient $\mu$ as $b = \tfrac{\mu v}{r}$, with $r$ being the wheel radius.

== Testing ==
Testing for RCF involves several methods, each designed to simulate the conditions that cause RCF in a controlled environment. Here are some of the methods used:

- Twin-Disc Stands: This method uses two discs to simulate the wear that occurs for rails and wheels.
- Scaled RCF Tests: These tests use two discs of different diameters.
- Three-Ball-on-Rod Tester: This is an economical RCF proof of concept test. It is performed to evaluate the influence of heat treatment, material, lubricant, and coatings on fatigue life.
- Lundberg-Palmgren Theory and ISO 281 Based Method: This method evaluates RCF reliability considering the contact load, the geometric parameters of contact pairs, the oscillation amplitude, the RCF reliability, and the material properties.

Triple disc rolling contact fatigue (RCF) Rig is a specialised testing apparatus used in the field of tribology and materials science to evaluate the fatigue resistance and durability of materials subjected to rolling contact. This rig is designed for simulating the conditions encountered in various mechanical systems, such as rolling bearings, gears, and other components exposed to repeated rolling and sliding motions. The rig typically consists of three discs or rollers arranged in a specific configuration. These discs can represent the interacting components of interest, such as a rolling bearing. The rig also allows precise control over the loading conditions, including the magnitude of the load, contact pressure, and contact geometry.

PCS Instruments Micro-pitting Rig (MPR) is a specialised testing instrument used in the field of tribology and mechanical engineering to study micro-pitting, a type of surface damage that occurs in lubricated rolling and sliding contact systems. The MPR is designed to simulate real-world operating conditions by subjecting test specimens, often gears or rolling bearings, to controlled rolling and sliding contact under lubricated conditions.

== See also ==
- Contact mechanics – Study of the deformation of solids that touch each other
- Derailment – Form of train incident
- Fretting – Wear or damage on loaded surfaces
- Frictional contact mechanics – Study of the deformation of bodies in the presence of frictional effects
- Friction – Force resisting sliding motion
- Wear – Damaging, gradual removal or deformation of material at solid surfaces
- Rolling-element bearing – Load-carrying bearing using rolling elements and rings
- Tribology – Science of rubbing surfaces
- Rolling (metalworking) – Metal forming process
- Surface roughness – Measure of surface finish or texture
- Lists of rail accidents
