= Expenditure and Food Survey =

The Expenditure and Food Survey (EFS) is a statistical survey conducted by the Office for National Statistics (ONS) and the Department for Environment, Food and Rural Affairs (DEFRA), which collects data on private household expenditure and food consumption in Great Britain. The EFS is now known as the Living Costs and Food Survey.

== History ==
From 1957 until 2001, two separate surveys were conducted each year: the Family Expenditure Survey (FES) and the National Food Survey (NFS). These were later combined into the Expenditure and Food Survey (EFS), fully replacing the previous surveys. The survey is conducted by the ONS, with DEFRA sponsoring the food data component.

The survey design is based on the original FES, with notable changes, including the introduction of the European Standard Classification of Individual Consumption by Purpose (COICOP). Another change involved adopting new processing software, SPSS, which has impacted the structure of the datasets.

In 2006, the EFS transitioned from a financial year system to a calendar year system. As of January 2008, the EFS became known as the Living Costs and Food (LCF) module of the Integrated Household Survey (IHS).

In 2008, the Expenditure and Food Survey (EFS) was integrated into the Integrated Household Survey (IHS) and renamed the Living Costs and Food Survey. The EFS was created by combining the Family Expenditure Survey (FES) and the National Food Survey (NFS) in 2001.

In the fiscal year ending in March 2023, the response rate for LCF in the UK was 22%, a decrease of 5% from the previous year. This decline was attributed to the COVID-19 pandemic and the shift to telephone interviews. The ONS is taking steps to improve data quality, including increasing the number of interviewers and planning to integrate electronic data sources by 2025.

== Methodology and Scope ==
The survey consists of a comprehensive household questionnaire, an individual questionnaire for each adult over 16 years of age, a personal expenditure diary kept by each individual over two weeks, and a simplified diary kept by children aged seven to 15.

== Survey Results ==
The data collected in the EFS serves multiple purposes, but it is primarily used for the Retail Prices Index, National Accounts estimates of household expenditure, analysis of the effects of taxes and benefits, and tracking trends in nutrition.

== Data Access ==
Data from the Living Costs and Food Survey (2008 to present), as well as from the Expenditure and Food Survey (2001 to 2007), is available for research and teaching use from the UK Data Service website.
