= History of rail transport in Great Britain 1995 to date =

History of British rail transport since 1995

Rail passengers in Great Britain from 1829 to 2026

The period from 1995 covers the history of rail transport in Great Britain following the privatisation of British Rail. During this period, passenger volumes have grown rapidly, safety has improved, and subsidies per journey have fallen, although there is debate as to whether this is due to privatisation or to better government regulation. During this period, High Speed 1, the West Coast Main Line upgrade and Crossrail were completed and more construction projects are currently under way. The period also saw the demise of privately owned Railtrack and its replacement with government-owned Network Rail.

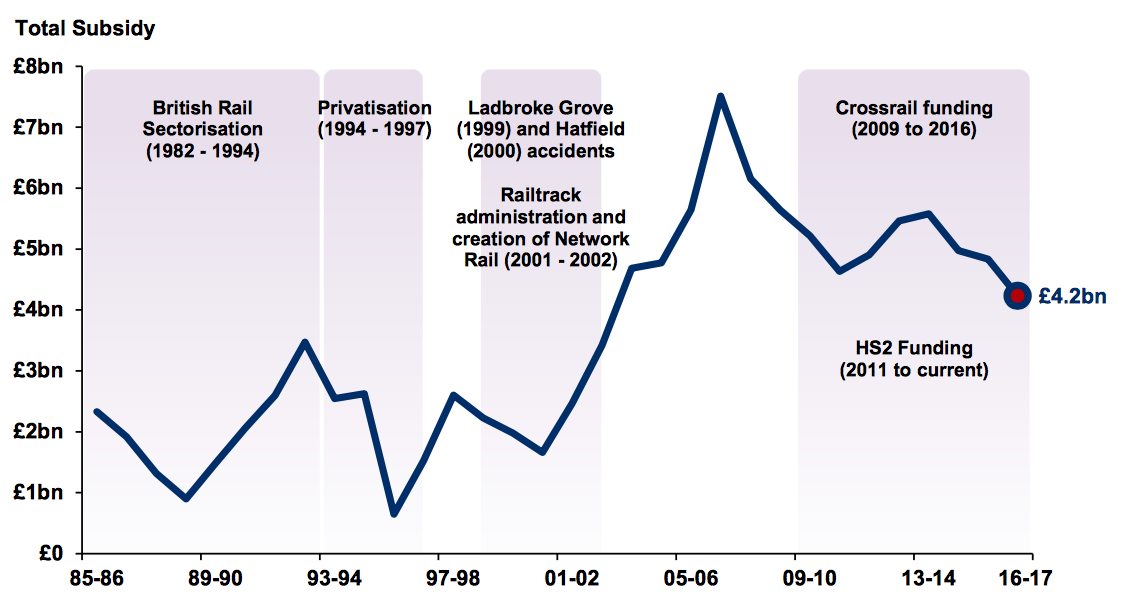
Rail subsidies from 1985/86 to 2016/17, including funding for Crossrail and HS2

Overall rail subsidies have risen, as shown in the graph, although spend per journey has decreased. Rail subsidies have increased from £3.3 billion in 1992–93 to £4.4 billion in 2015–16 (in current prices), but subsidy per journey has fallen from £4.39 to £2.57. However, this masks great regional variation: for instance, in 2014–15 funding varied from "£1.41 per passenger journey in England to £6.51 per journey in Scotland and £8.34 per journey in Wales."

Due to the increase in passenger numbers and the prospect of high speed rail both within Great Britain and connecting to Europe, this period has been called the start of a new Golden Age of rail travel. Rapidly increasing passenger numbers have meant many trains (as many as 1 in 6 in some places) are crowded at peak times. Peak-time fares have increased by over 200% (since privatisation) to deter people from travelling at these times, whereas the price of advance tickets has halved in the same period. The COVID-19 pandemic caused a large drop in passenger numbers.

== Government policy ==
=== Changes under the Labour government (1997–2010) ===
Rail share of passenger transport (1952–2023)

The Labour government (elected in 1997 after the majority of the privatisation process had been completed) did not completely reverse the railway privatisation of the previous administration. Initially it left the new structure largely in place, and its main innovation in the early years was the creation of the Strategic Rail Authority, at first in shadow form until the Transport Act 2000 received royal assent, as well as the appointment of Tom Winsor as Rail Regulator, who took a much harder line with the rail industry, and Railtrack in particular.

In the wake of the Hatfield rail crash in 2000, Railtrack entered into financial meltdown and the industry was in deep crisis. Labour refused to continue to bail out Railtrack and the company was put into Railway Administration in 2001 before a new company, Network Rail, emerged to replace it in 2002. Since September 2014, Network Rail has been classified as a "government body".

The Strategic Rail Authority lasted five years. Following the passing of the Railways Act 2005, its business was wound up and its functions transferred to the Department for Transport Rail Group and the Office of Rail Regulation. Further changes followed, which saw the government take back a greater degree of control.

Another important development occurred in the aftermath of the Potters Bar accident in May 2002 when a commuter train derailed (coincidentally on the same stretch of the East Coast Main Line as Hatfield) due to poorly maintained points. This resulted in Network Rail taking all track maintenance back in-house, and the industry went on to achieve the longest period in modern times without a fatal accident due to industry error. This came to an end in February 2007 when a Virgin Trains West Coast Class 390 Pendolino derailed near Grayrigg in Cumbria, killing one person. The cause of the accident was identical to that in Potters Bar nearly five years earlier, again calling into question Network Rail's maintenance procedures.

In 2006, the government launched the Access for All programme to improve accessibility at railway stations in Great Britain. The £390 million main programme (extended in 2014 with a further £163 million) delivered accessibility projects at more than 150 stations.

In 2007, the government's preferred option was to use diesel trains running on biodiesel, its White Paper Delivering a Sustainable Railway, ruling out large-scale railway electrification in Great Britain for the following five years.

Following Gordon Brown's appointment as prime minister in 2007, Andrew Adonis was appointed Transport Secretary. He immediately began work on plans for a new high-speed route between London and Birmingham (later known as High Speed 2), which would augment the West Coast Main Line. Adonis also announced plans to electrify the Great Western Main Line from London as far as Swansea, as well as infill electrification schemes in the North West of England to remove diesel traction from certain key routes. Late in 2009, the InterCity East Coast franchise collapsed for the second time in three years when incumbent operator National Express East Coast proved unable to meet its financial obligations. Adonis transferred the franchise to the state-owned Directly Operated Railways to operate the route under its East Coast subsidiary.

In February 2009, the Department for Transport set up a company called Diesel Trains Ltd with the intention of funding and managing the procurement of up to 200 diesel multiple unit vehicles as part of the government's planned purchase of as many as 1300 new rail vehicles. It was incorporated following the announcement of the first 200 vehicles in late 2008 as part of the Pre-Budget Report. The speed of this announcement (the final contract to be signed in April 2009) led the government to take the lead in financing the procurement, through a public company. However, the DfT stated that it did not intend to serve in the long-term as a lessor of rolling stock. As a consequence, the DfT planned to sell Diesel Trains Ltd once the procurement process was completed, either as a whole, or by selling its assets and contracts.

Diesel Trains Ltd was to have responsibility for the purchase and distribution of 202 DMU vehicles to three TOCs – First Great Western, First TransPennine Express and Northern Rail. The order itself was to encompass a total of 61 trains, with 19 four-car and 42 three-car. Following the announcement in August 2009 that the Great Western Main Line was to be electrified, the order for 202 DMUs was cancelled. After lying dormant for three years, Diesel Trains Ltd was dissolved in July 2012.

=== Changes under the Coalition government (2010–2015) ===
After the 2010 General Election, the new Conservative-led coalition continued Labour's rail policies largely unaltered after a pause to review the finances. There was continuing support for the High Speed 2 scheme and further developing plans for the route, although the scheme's benefits and costs were debated. Whilst initially showing scepticism towards the electrification schemes of the Great Western route, they later gave the project its backing and work began formally in 2012.

In July 2012, the government published a £9.4 billion High Level Output Specification for the 2014–2019 period, which included £4.2 billion of new schemes. This included the Electric Spine project to electrify the railway between Southampton in the south and Nuneaton and Sheffield in the north, electrification of the Midland Main Line from Bedford to Sheffield, Cardiff–Swansea and Valley Lines electrification, and the Western Rail Approach to Heathrow. The Electric Spine, Midland Main Line electrification and Cardiff–Swansea electrification were later scrapped in July 2017. Following the COVID-19 pandemic, the Western Rail Approach to Heathrow was shelved in January 2021.

In 2012, the franchising system again came under criticism after FirstGroup was awarded the InterCity West Coast franchise. Incumbent Virgin Rail Group initiated a judicial review against the decision, citing the fact that First's bid was more ambitious than the one which had scuttled National Express East Coast less than three years earlier. Before the review took place, newly installed Transport Secretary Patrick McLoughlin scrapped the entire bidding process for the franchise and granted Virgin an extension to its contract when "severe technical flaws" were discovered in the original bidding competition.

=== The Conservative government (2015–2024) ===
The government moved towards allowing more competition on the intercity network through open access operators. In 2015 it approved a service run by Alliance Rail Holdings to operate between London Euston and Blackpool, and in 2016 it allowed FirstGroup to run open access services on the East Coast Main Line from October 2021 under the operating name Lumo.

==== Fare increases ====
The government pledged in August 2015 to keep regulated rail fare increases at Retail Prices Index (RPI) inflation for the remainder of the 2015 Parliament. In addition, debate continued over the financing of various rail schemes driven primarily by the huge cost and time overrun on the GWML route modernisation and electrification scheme. In connection with this, and to coincide with the Chancellor's Autumn statement in November 2015, the Bowe and Hendy reports were produced.

==== 2016–2019 rail strikes ====
From April 2016, the British railway network was severely disrupted on many occasions by wide-reaching rail strikes, affecting rail franchises across the country. The industrial action began on Southern services as a dispute over the planned introduction of driver-only operation, and expanded to cover many different issues affecting the rail industry.

==== Cost of living crisis and the 2022–2024 rail strikes ====
Due to the cost-of-living crisis, RMT union members at Network Rail and 13 train operating companies voted in favour of strike action on 24 May 2022. It was the first national strike at Network Rail since 1994. On 11 July 2022, ASLEF union members at eight train operating companies and TSSA members at Southeastern also voted in favour of strike action. RMT members voted to accept a pay deal with Network Rail in March 2023 and the industrial action in Scotland and Wales ended in May 2023, while the RMT dispute with the Rail Delivery Group is ongoing as of September 2023.

As a response to the cost-of-living crisis, the government approved a 5.9% rise in rail fares from 5 March 2023, which was 6.4 percentage points below the RPI inflation rate in July 2022 which is normally used to calculate fare increases.

In July 2023, the government announced plans to close the majority of ticket offices. The plan was abandoned in October 2023.

==== Infrastructure projects ====
In March 2016, the National Infrastructure Commission said that Crossrail 2 should be taken forward "as a priority" and recommended that a bill should pass through Parliament by 2019 and the line should be open by 2033. Crossrail 2 is a north–south railway through London, similar to the east–west railway Crossrail which is currently under construction.

In July 2017, Chris Grayling, the secretary of state for transport announced a number of electrification schemes were to be suspended indefinitely citing the disruptive nature of electrification works and the availability of bi-mode technology. The schemes included aspects of the GWML including Cardiff to Swansea, the Midland Main Line from Kettering to Sheffield via Derby and Nottingham and Oxenholme to Windermere in the Lake District.

In February 2018, the five-year plan was published by Network Rail with significant investment though much of this was for renewals and smaller projects rather than major projects. In March 2019 the Railway Industry Association published a paper entitled Electrification Cost Challenge.

In July 2019, the Urban Transport Group released a report that showed regional rail travel had experienced a 29% growth in the ten years to 2017/18.

On 24 July 2019, Grant Shapps was appointed Secretary of State for Transport under the new Prime Minister Boris Johnson.

The Transport Select Committee have met on a number of occasions since early 2020 and considered the "Trains Fit for the Future" ongoing enquiry which was started under the previous session under Lilian Greenwood's chairship. The report, published in March 2021, recommended a rolling programme of electrification and for the DfT to quickly publish a list of “no regret” electrification schemes. It was stated that Network Rail had already supplied a list to the DfT.

The TDNS (Traction Decarbonisation Network Strategy) Interim Business case was published in September 2020. The main theme was electrification of 13,000 single track kilometres (8,100 miles) of UK railways.

In September 2020, the government abolished the rail franchising system. On 20 May 2021, the government announced and published a white paper that detailed how it would transform the operation of the railways. The rail network will be partly renationalised, with infrastructure and operations brought together under a new company Great British Railways. Operations will be managed on a concessions model. According to the BBC, this represents the largest shake-up in the UK's railways since privatisation.

On 18 November 2021, the Integrated Rail Plan (IRP) was published. This affected parts of the HS2 programme including curtailing much of the eastern leg but did include full Midland Main Line electrification and upgrades. Also included was a commitment to the Transpennine north railway upgrade to include full electrification.

On the back of the IRP, the Union Connectivity Review was also published in November 2021. The Union Connectivity Review was announced on 30 June 2020 by the Prime Minister Boris Johnson. It was stated that Sir Peter Hendy would chair the review. The terms of reference were published 3 October 2020. An interim report was published March 2021.

The final report was published on 25 November 2021. In December 2021 The Telegraph newspaper reported in an apparent leak, that the treasury had decided not to provide funds for further electrification and thus help to decarbonise the railways.

The official announcement and confirmation that the Midland Main Line between Kettering and Market Harborough was being electrified and spades would be in the ground starting 24 December 2021 was made on 21 December 2021.

==== COVID-19 pandemic effect on railways in Great Britain ====
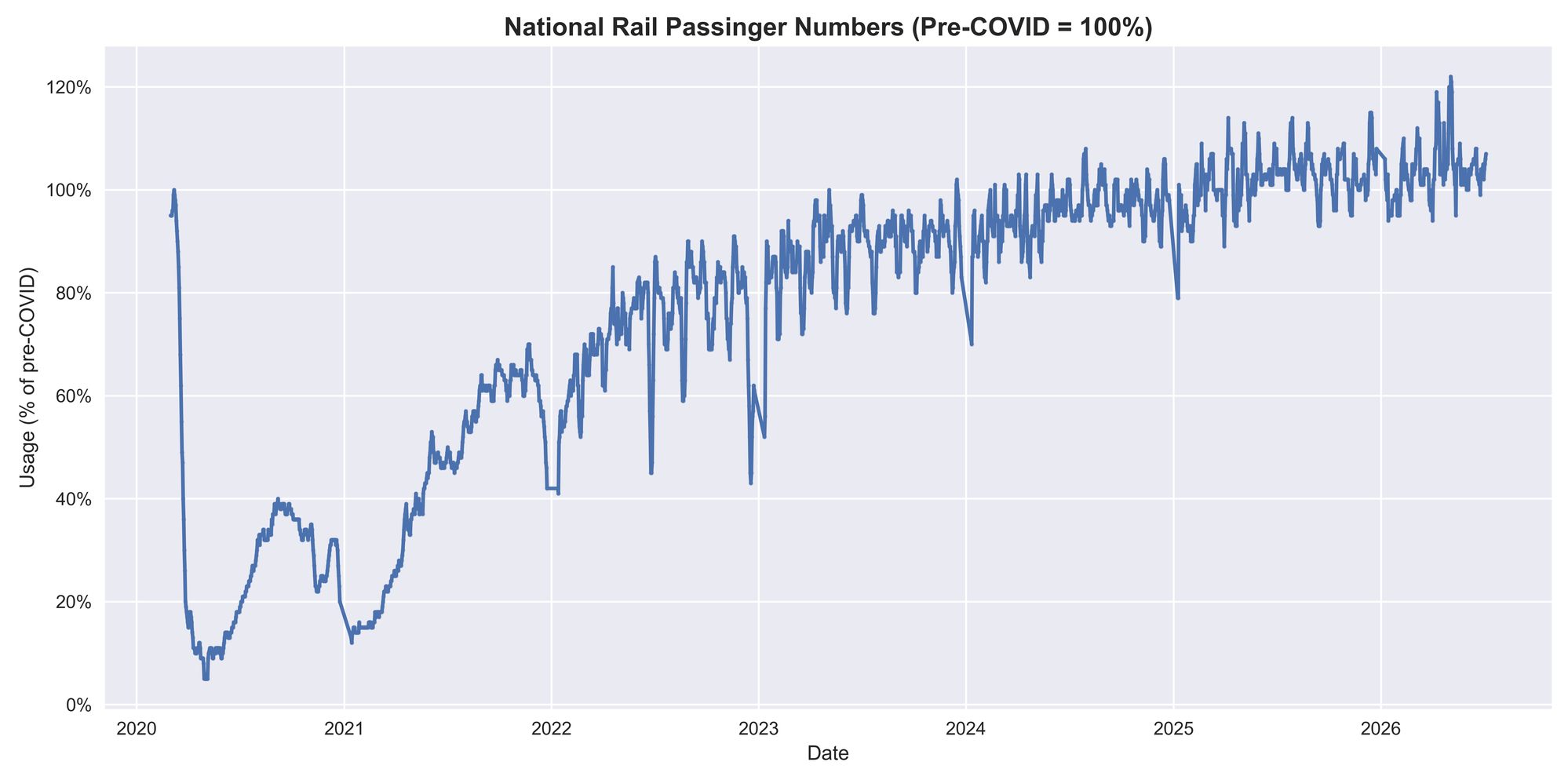
Recovery of National Rail usage post COVID-19 pandemic. Pre-pandemic usage is normalised to 100%. Data series begins in March 2020 and carries into July 2026

The COVID-19 pandemic in the United Kingdom occurred in this period and caused a catastrophic fall off in the number of passengers using the rail network although freight held up reasonably well. While passenger numbers had recovered to over 80% of their pre-Covid levels by July-September 2022, how this will affect the long-term health of the rail industry remains to be seen. Despite the pandemic the Traction Decarbonisation Strategy Interim Business case was published in July 2020. In addition, Network Rail also published its Environmental sustainability strategy.

In direct response to falling passenger numbers and revenues, the Wales & Borders operator Transport for Wales Rail was put into public ownership by the Welsh Government on 7 February 2021.

=== The Labour government (2024–present) ===
On 25 May 2025, Labour's renationalisation of the UK's railways began as the train operator South Western Railway was taken into public ownership. Passenger train operators continue to be renationalised, with services to be managed at some future time by Great British Railways. The process is expected to be complete in October 2027.

== Infrastructure projects ==
=== Completed projects ===
The British railway system continues to be developed. Contemporary projects include:

- The West Coast Main Line upgrade (West Coast Main Line route modernisation) was a long-term project covering a series of technical aspects. Improvements included the four-tracking (from three) of the Trent Valley (a bypass of the West Midlands), redesigning the layout of several junction/stations e.g. Rugby and other associated work to increase line speed. This culminated in tilting trains at 125 mph being extended to Glasgow in 2005. The cost overruns of the programme are infamous – attributed to the wide scope of the programme (the promise to Virgin to build a 140 mph railway which would require moving block signalling) and poor project management by the defunct Railtrack.

==== England ====
- High Speed 1, a project to construct a 67-mile (108 km) high-speed rail line from London to the British end of the Channel Tunnel, and involving a great deal of complex civil engineering including a 1,404-yard (1,284 m) bridge over the River Medway, a 2-mile (3.2 km) tunnel under the Thames near Dartford, a 2-mile tunnel through the North Downs, 12-mile (19 km) twin tunnels running into central London, a major new railway station extension to London St Pancras, and a complex redesign and rebuild of the King's Cross St Pancras tube station. The southern phase 1 of the project opened in September 2003, and northern phase 2 opened in November 2007.
- The Thameslink Programme started in 2009 and was completed in September 2020. The project includes the lengthening of platforms, station remodelling, new railway infrastructure (e.g. viaducts) and new rolling stock, which has allowed Govia Thameslink Railway to expand their Thameslink services to more destinations on the north and south.
- Crossrail was a railway construction project in London and its environs. Its aim is to provide a high-frequency hybrid commuter rail/rapid transit passenger service that links parts of Berkshire and Buckinghamshire, via central London, to Essex and South East London. Work began in 2009 on the central section of the line—a new tunnel through central London—and connections to the Great Western Main Line and Great Eastern Main Line that would become part of Crossrail. The central section from Paddington to Abbey Wood opened as the Elizabeth line on 24 May 2022. The introduction of the full peak timetable with 24 trains per hour and direct services between Heathrow Airport and Essex on 21 May 2023 marked the practical completion of the project.
- The Northern Hub was a rail project across Northern England aimed at stimulating economic growth by increasing train services, reducing journey times and electrifying lines between the major cities and towns in the north. The project was announced as the Manchester Hub, entailing a series of upgrades to increase capacity and cut journey times between cities in Northern England by resolving rail bottlenecks around Manchester city centre. Manchester Piccadilly was planned to have two new through platforms constructed to increase the frequency of trains from 10 per hour to 14, but the plan was withdrawn in 2023. Manchester Victoria station was modernised (including electrification, a new Metrolink station and a new roof) to become the east–west rail interchange in northern England. Services from Liverpool to Leeds and beyond will be diverted from the Cheshire Lines route via Warrington Central and Manchester Piccadilly to the electrified line via Newton-le-Willows and Manchester Victoria. Trains from the north east to Manchester Airport now use a new section of railway, the £85 million Ordsall Chord, between Manchester Victoria and Manchester Oxford Road to access Manchester Piccadilly and continue to the airport without the need to reverse at Piccadilly and without conflicting movements at the station throat. The chord opened on 10 December 2017.
- The electrification of both the Liverpool to Manchester northern route and the Liverpool–Wigan line were completed in 2015 and electric Class 319 trains (on the Liverpool to Manchester Airport service) and Class 350s (on the Manchester Airport to Scotland services) have replaced diesel units. The Preston–Blackpool North line and the Manchester–Preston line have been electrified with electric Class 319 trains entering service on 20 May 2018 and 11 February 2019 respectively.
- Electrification of the Cross-City Line to Bromsgrove has been completed, which allowed electric trains to run from summer 2018.
- The Northumberland Line, a project to reintroduce passenger services to the previously freight-only line between Newcastle and Ashington was completed in March 2026. Originally built by the Blyth and Tyne Railway, passenger services on the line were withdrawn as part of the Beeching cuts. The project involved track replacement, signalling upgrades, closure of level crossings and the construction of six new stations. Following the granting of a Transport and Works Act Order, main works began in early 2022. The first trains ran between Newcastle and Ashington in December 2024 but did not call at Blyth Bebside, Bedlington or Northumberland Park as these stations opened between 2025 and Early 2026.

==== Scotland ====
- The Stirling-Alloa-Kincardine railway, a 13-mile (21 km) extension to the network, to the north of the Firth of Forth in Scotland. A Bill for the railway was passed by the Scottish Parliament and received Royal Assent in August 2004. Work commenced in September 2005, with services running by early 2008. The line re-establishes a railway decommissioned in 1983; the new line provided passenger connections to Glasgow, and freight links between the site of Kincardine power station, now used as a loading point for coal from open-cast sites, to avoid heavy traffic through Kincardine, and Longannet power station, and the coal terminals at Hunterston Deep Water Port. Longannet power station closed in 2016. The passenger part of the scheme, from Stirling to Alloa was in any case secure, and the Scottish Parliament appear to be in favour of passenger services being extended to Rosyth. This could possibly result in passenger stations serving the communities of Clackmannan, Kincardine, and Culross or Valleyfield, and through trains once more from Stirling to Dunfermline.
- A short extension of the Glasgow-Hamilton-Motherwell, which once again links Larkhall to the railway network after 40 years. Larkhall has for some time been the largest town in Scotland without a railway station. The new £35 million line follows an existing formation, and services to Larkhall railway station resumed on 12 December 2005. The new section of route is electrified and is served with trains from Dalmuir, via Glasgow Central Low Level, with connections from other northern suburbs of Glasgow such as Milngavie.
- The Airdrie–Bathgate rail link was a project to upgrade the railway between Airdrie and Bathgate. The route, originally part of the Bathgate and Coatbridge Railway, was completely closed in 1982 and reopened as a single track railway in 1986. The project included double tracking, electrification, new stations at Blackridge and Armadale, and the relocation of Drumgelloch and Bathgate station. Passenger services on the upgraded line began on 12 December 2010, but the opening of three new stations was delayed to March 2011 due to severe weather. The project cost £300 million.
- The Glasgow Airport Rail Link was given the go-ahead by the Scottish Parliament in December 2006 but the project was scrapped by the new SNP minority government in September 2009. A new 1.5-mile (2.4 km) spur was to be built onto the existing Inverclyde route. An element of the project that did go ahead was upgrading the Glasgow Central – Paisley line to triple track to increase capacity on the Ayrshire and Inverclyde routes. This work was completed in 2012.
- A 35-mile (56 km) section of the Waverley Route from Edinburgh to Tweedbank in the Scottish Borders has been rebuilt after approval by the Scottish Parliament, which reopened on 6 September 2015. This project, also known as the Borders Railway, restored rail services to communities which have lacked access to the National Rail network since the Beeching cuts.
- The Edinburgh to Glasgow Improvement Programme (EGIP) was an initiative started by the Scottish Government to increase capacity on the main railway line between Edinburgh and Glasgow via Falkirk. As part of the programme, the new Edinburgh Gateway station opened on 9 December 2016. Electric services on the line began on 10 December 2017. The opening of the redeveloped Glasgow Queen Street station on 4 October 2021 marked the completion of the programme. The final cost was estimated to be £870 million.
- The rolling programme of electrification in Scotland saw lines from Edinburgh and Glasgow electrified to Stirling, Dunblane and Alloa.
- The £160 million Edinburgh to Glasgow Central line via Shotts electrification was completed on time and on budget.

==== Wales ====
- The Welsh Assembly Government re-opened 18 miles (29 km) of Vale of Glamorgan Line between Barry and Bridgend in June 2005.
- The 18-mile (29 km) Ebbw Valley Railway between Ebbw Vale Parkway and Cardiff Central was reopened to passenger services on 6 February 2008. An extension of the line to Ebbw Vale Town opened on 11 June 2015.

=== Current developments ===
==== England ====
- High Speed 2 (HS2) is a high-speed railway under construction which will initially link the cities of London and Birmingham, followed by further extension to North West England and East Midlands. Construction of the first phase of HS2 began on 3 September 2020 with a planned opening date of between 2029 and 2033, while Phase 2a is expected to open between 2030 and 2034 and the western leg of Phase 2b between 2035 and 2041. Phase 1 of HS2 was planned to run between London Euston and the new Birmingham Curzon Street station, but due to delays at Euston, services will initially terminate at Old Oak Common. Phase 2a will run from Birmingham to Crewe, while Phase 2b will have two branches: a western leg from Crewe to Manchester Piccadilly, and an eastern leg from Birmingham Interchange to the proposed East Midlands Parkway station, the original plan serving Leeds via East Midlands Hub and Meadowhall Interchange having been scrapped by the Integrated Rail Plan. Phase 2a from Lichfield to Crewe received Royal Assent on 11 February 2021.
- On the Great Western Main Line, Network Rail plans to spend £5 billion on modernising the GWML and its South Wales branch plus other associated lines like the North Cotswolds which was completed in 2011. The modernisation plans were announced at separate times but their development time-scales overlap each other to represent a comprehensive modernisation plan for the Great Western and its associated lines in the 2010s. The modernisation includes electrification, resignalling, new rolling stock and station upgrades. According to Network Rail, the modernisation started in June 2010 and was projected to end in 2017. On 8 November 2016 the government announced that several elements of the Great Western Main Line electrification programme would be indefinitely deferred due to cost overruns and delays. Subsequently, in July 2017, Cardiff–Swansea electrification was cancelled. Electric services began running between London and Cardiff on 5 January 2020.
- The Transpennine Route Upgrade is a long-term upgrade project on the railway between Manchester and York via Leeds, which includes the Huddersfield line and part of the Cross Country Route. The upgrade includes line speed increases, electrification and station remodelling (including the relocation of Morley station). As of July 2022, the whole upgrade was projected to be completed by 2041.
- The Midland Main Line upgrade is an upgrade project on the Midland Main Line which includes electrification, line speed increases, station remodelling and power supply upgrades. As a result of the upgrade, East Midlands Railway started running electric services from Corby to St Pancras on 17 May 2021. Work on electrifying the line between Kettering and Market Harborough started on 24 December 2021. Subsequently, the next phase of electrifying the section between Market Harborough and Wigston began on 3 November 2022.
- East West Rail is a project to re-establish a railway line connecting Oxford and Cambridge via Bicester, Bletchley and Bedford, largely following the route of the former Varsity Line which was closed in 1968. The westernmost part of the project coincided with Phase 2 of the Evergreen 3 project and saw the Oxford–Bicester line upgraded to double track and 100 mph (160 km/h) running. Chiltern Railways introduced a new Oxford–Marylebone service on 12 December 2016. The construction of the new Winslow station began in late 2021.
- The £145 million Hope Valley Line upgrade involves reinstating the second line and platform at Dore and Totley station, a new passing loop between Bamford and Hathersage to allow passenger trains to overtake slower freight trains and platform extensions to accommodate six-car trains. The construction of the second platform at Dore & Totley began on 15 July 2023. As of January 2023, the project was expected to be completed in spring 2024.
- The railway between Bolton and Wigan, which was first built as part of the Liverpool and Bury Railway, has been electrified. The £78 million electrification project was approved by the government on 1 September 2021. As part of the project, the platforms at Hindley, Westhoughton and Ince will be extended. The completion date will be 2025.

==== Scotland ====
- Scotland has committed to a rolling programme of electrification to decarbonise the network by 2045 but with an even more aggressive target for decarbonisation of the passenger network by 2035. The first announced project is the electrification of the route to Barrhead and East Kilbride. As well as electrification, double tracking from Busby to East Kilbride is planned as well as lengthening platforms at existing stations. Part of the project scope includes relocating Hairmyres station and a complete rebuild of East Kilbride station.
- Scotland has also published a plan and split it into components identified as: in delivery, in development or under active consideration. As of 2021 projects in delivery include improvements to Aberdeen Station and other renewals in the Carstairs area and also Motherwell. The electrification to East Kilbride is also included in this category. In 2021 projects considered in development are mainly those that support the decarbonisation agenda. New electrification will require new 25kV Grid Feeders and upgrading existing ones to handle the increased electrical load. Partial electrification of the Borders Railway are included here along with Barrhead and Haymarket to Dalmeny and Leven. Projects classed as under active consideration again are almost exclusively those supporting the decarbonisation agenda and include most if not all future phases of decarbonisation plan. All of Scotland's seven cities are included and thus include improvements and electrification the routes out of Aberdeen including to the Central Belt and Inverness. The Highland Main Line from Perth to Inverness is also included in the plan. This obviously requires continuation of the previous scheme from Stirling to Dunblane and Alloa. So Dunblane to Hilton junction and Perth along with all the other necessary infrastructure improvements such as route clearance are part of the infrastructure upgrade plan. The Fife Circle line and extensions to Longannet and Dundee and Perth are all part of this. Electrification in Ayrshire and south west of Glasgow are under active consideration too.
- The Levenmouth rail link was opened to passenger service on 2 June 2024 following a £116 million project to reopen the 8 kilometres (5 mi) of railway line in Fife connecting Leven with Thornton Junction. The project required reinstating 19km of double track, constructing two new stations (Leven and Cameron Bridge) and electrification. Following project approval by Transport Scotland, construction started on 4 March 2022. The construction of Cameron Bridge station began on 24 January 2023, while that of Leven station began on 1 March 2023. The stations were opened ceremonially on 29 May 2024 by John Swinney, the First Minister of Scotland, and the route entered service on 2 June 2024, served by a half-hourly ScotRail service to Edinburgh via Dunfermline or Kirkcaldy (alternating).

==== Wales ====
- The Welsh Assembly Government proposes to extend the Ebbw Valley line between Ebbw Vale and Cardiff into Newport in the future. The Assembly Government is also looking into opening the Hirwaun to Aberdare route in the Cynon Valley. In addition to further progress on the South Wales Metro, and North Wales Metro.
- The South Wales Metro is a project to improve services on the Valleys & Cardiff Local Routes. It involves electrification, double tracking, new Class 398, 756 and 231 rolling stock, new stations such as Crwys Road and a new depot and signalling centre at Taffs Well. The project aims to enable four trains per hour to run on each line. The first Class 398s arrived at the Taffs Well depot in March 2023.

=== Timeline of improvements ===
==== 2010 ====
- May: As part of the Paisley Corridor Improvements project, the new platforms 12 and 13 at Glasgow Central opened.

==== 2011 ====
- March: ETCS Level 2 entered into service on the entire Cambrian Line.
- July: The £10 million structural upgrade of Arnside Viaduct was completed, increasing the speed of the Furness line through the viaduct from 30 mph (48 km/h) to 60 mph (97 km/h).
- August: The Cotswold Line was redoubled between Ascott-under-Wychwood and east of Charlbury and between Moreton-in-Marsh and Evesham. In addition, the disused second platforms at Charlbury, Ascott-under-Wychwood and Honeybourne were brought back into use and digital signalling was introduced.
- December: First Capital Connect began running 12-car Class 377/2 units on the Thameslink route.
- December: The disused platforms 3 and 4 at Bushey station were brought back into use as part of the December 2011 timetable change.
- December: The £16.7 million platforms 7 and 8 at Cambridge station opened, enabling 12-car Class 379s to run between Cambridge and Liverpool Street.
- December: As part of the Thameslink Programme, the new West Hampstead Thameslink station building on Iverson Road opened and platforms at the station were lengthened to accommodate 12-car trains.

==== 2012 ====
The new western concourse of King's Cross station

- March: The new western concourse of King's Cross station designed by John McAslan opened, providing more space for passengers departing the station and better integration with Thameslink and the Underground.
- April: The £2.1 million reconstructed Cosford station opened.
- May: After a £8 million upgrade, Loughborough station reopened with platforms 1 and 2 extended to accommodate 10-car trains, a new footbridge and lifts.
- May: Fishguard and Goodwick station reopened after being closed to passengers in 1964.
- May: As part of the Thameslink Programme, two new bay platforms opened at Blackfriars station.
- August: The £8 million new Gourock station building opened.
- November: After a £20 million upgrade, Stalybridge station reopened with two new platforms, a redesigned track layout and new signalling.
- November: As part of the Felixstowe to Nuneaton railway upgrade, the £28 million Nuneaton North Chord opened, enabling freight trains on the Birmingham–Peterborough line to cross the WCML on a bridge and then join the WCML down slow line.
- December: The £4 million passing loop at Beccles was opened and the second platform at the station was brought back to use, enabling an hourly service on the East Suffolk line.
- December: The £12 million electrification of the Paisley Canal line was completed.
- December: Finsbury Park had platforms 3 and 5 extended to accommodate 12-car trains.
- December: The new East Grinstead station building opened and platforms at the station were extended to accommodate 12-car trains.

==== 2013 ====
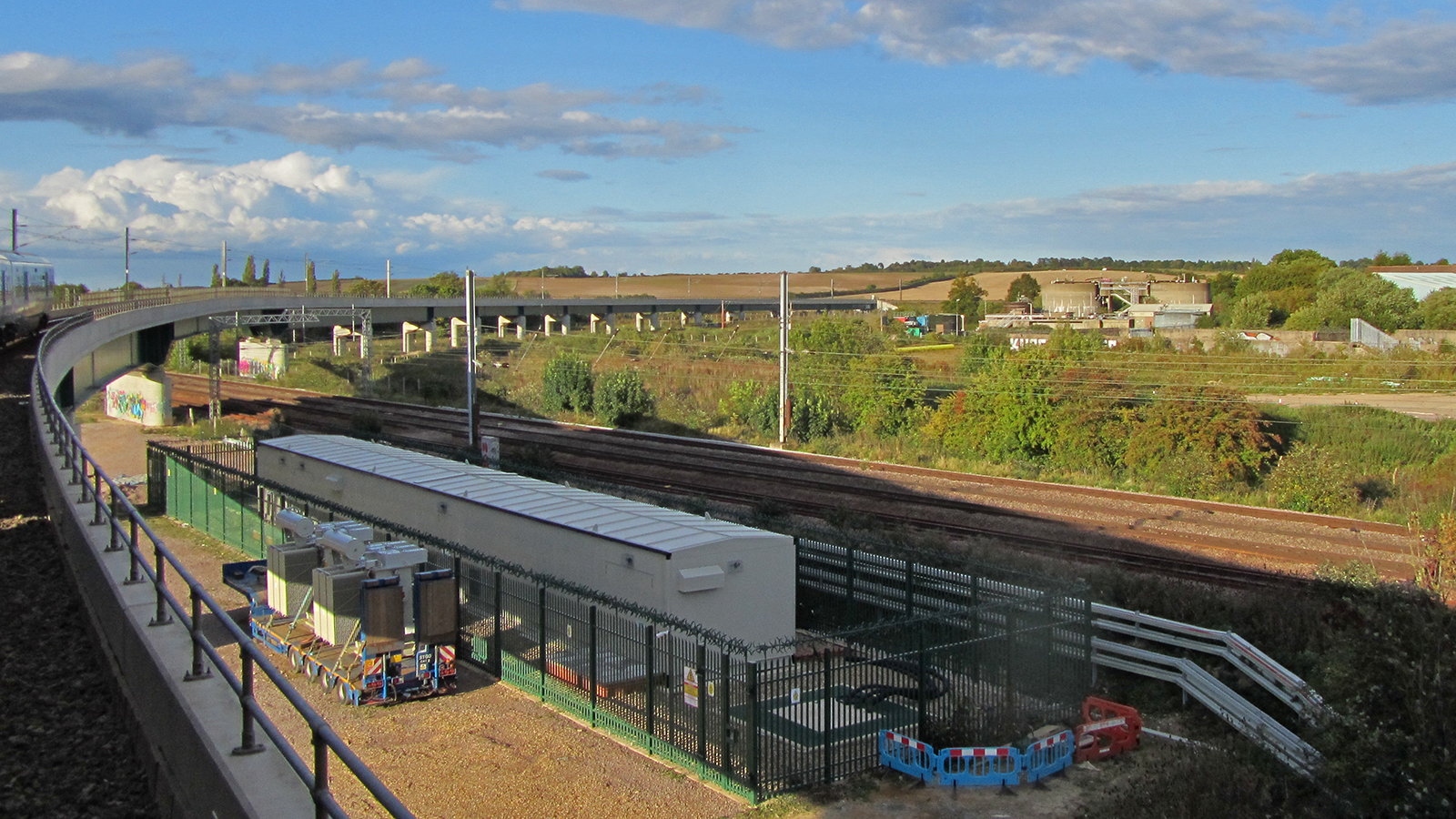
The Hitchin Flyover seen from a train using it

- April: Network Rail completed a £48 million project to replace the Loughor Viaduct and redouble the West Wales line through Gowerton.
- May: The £11 million new Dalmarnock station building opened.
- June: The £47 million Hitchin Flyover opened to passenger services, removing the need for trains from King's Cross switching to the Cambridge line to cross three lines of the ECML and thus reducing delays and creating capacity for more services.
- August: The new Dartford station building opened.
- October: The £6 million new Wokingham station building opened with a new footbridge and lifts.
- October: Following a £12 million upgrade, Salford Crescent had platforms extended to accommodate six-car trains, a new street-level ticket office and a lift to make the station fully accessible.
- December: The Liverpool to Manchester northern route was electrified between Newton-le-Willows and Castlefield junction outside Manchester Piccadilly, allowing First TransPennine Express to run electric services between Manchester Airport and Glasgow Central/Edinburgh Waverley using Class 350 EMUs.
- December: The £5.2 million Energlyn & Churchill Park railway station on the Rhymney line was opened by the Welsh Government Transport Minister Edwina Hart.
- December: As part of the Edinburgh to Glasgow Improvement Programme, the £25 million new main building and concourse of Haymarket station opened, providing step-free access via a new footbridge and direct access to the tram station.
- December: The £8 million new Wakefield Westgate station building opened to passengers.
- December: After a three-day closure over Christmas, Peterborough station reopened with longer platforms, a new platform on the west of the station and a new signalling system.

==== 2014 ====
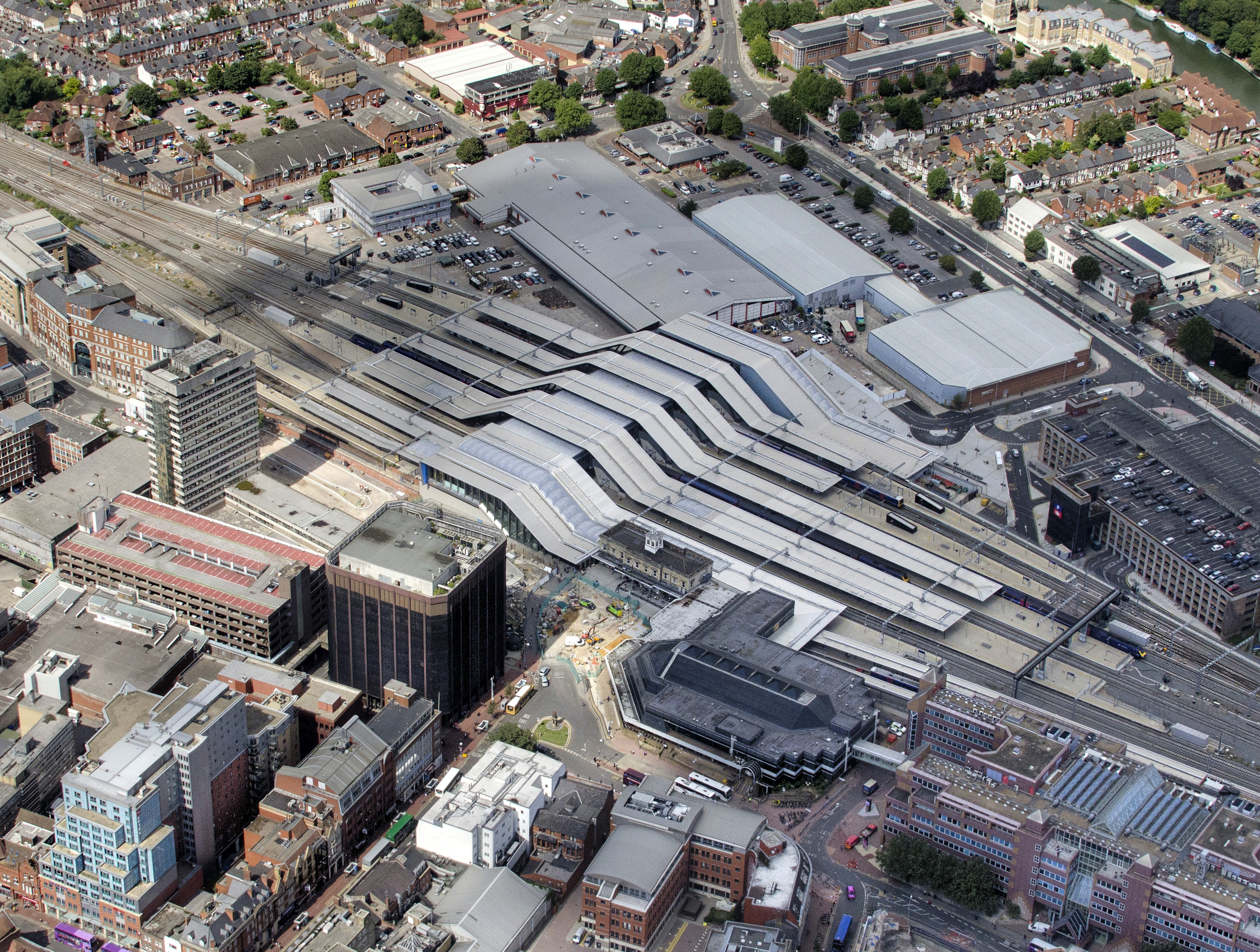
An aerial view of the redeveloped Reading station

- January: After a £19 million upgrade over the Christmas period, Gravesend station reopened with existing platforms lengthened to accommodate 12-car trains and a new third platform.
- February: As part of a £53 million redevelopment programme, the new platform 7 at Gatwick Airport was opened by Minister of State for Transport Baroness Kramer.
- March: The Great Northern and Great Eastern Joint Railway capacity upgrade, which included line speed increases, modernisation of level crossings, W12 gauge clearance and resignalling, was completed.
- March: As part of the Felixstowe to Nuneaton railway upgrade, the new £59 million Ipswich Chord connecting the East Suffolk line with the Great Eastern Main Line opened, removing the need for freight trains to reverse at Ipswich.
- April: As part of the £250 million Stafford Area Improvements Programme, the speed of the WCML slow line between Crewe and Stafford was increased from 75 miles per hour (121 km/h) to 100 miles per hour (160 km/h).
- June: The £45 million Doncaster North Chord opened to freight trains on the South Humberside Main Line, allowing them to cross the East Coast Main Line on a new bridge.
- July: The redeveloped Reading station opened with five additional platforms.
- August: Network Rail completed the redoubling of the Golden Valley line from Swindon to Kemble.
- September: The £20 million replacement bridge for Pont Briwet opened to Cambrian Coast Line services, allowing the line speed to be raised from 30 km/h (19 mph) to 65 km/h (40 mph).
- November: An £8 million strengthening and restoration programme of Hawarden Bridge was completed, removing all the operational restrictions that had been in place.
- November: The redeveloped Nottingham station was officially opened with an extra platform, line speed increases, resignalling, and a new fully accessible southern concourse.
- December: The second platform at Alvechurch opened, increasing the frequency of the Redditch branch of the Cross-City Line from two to three trains per hour.

==== 2015 ====
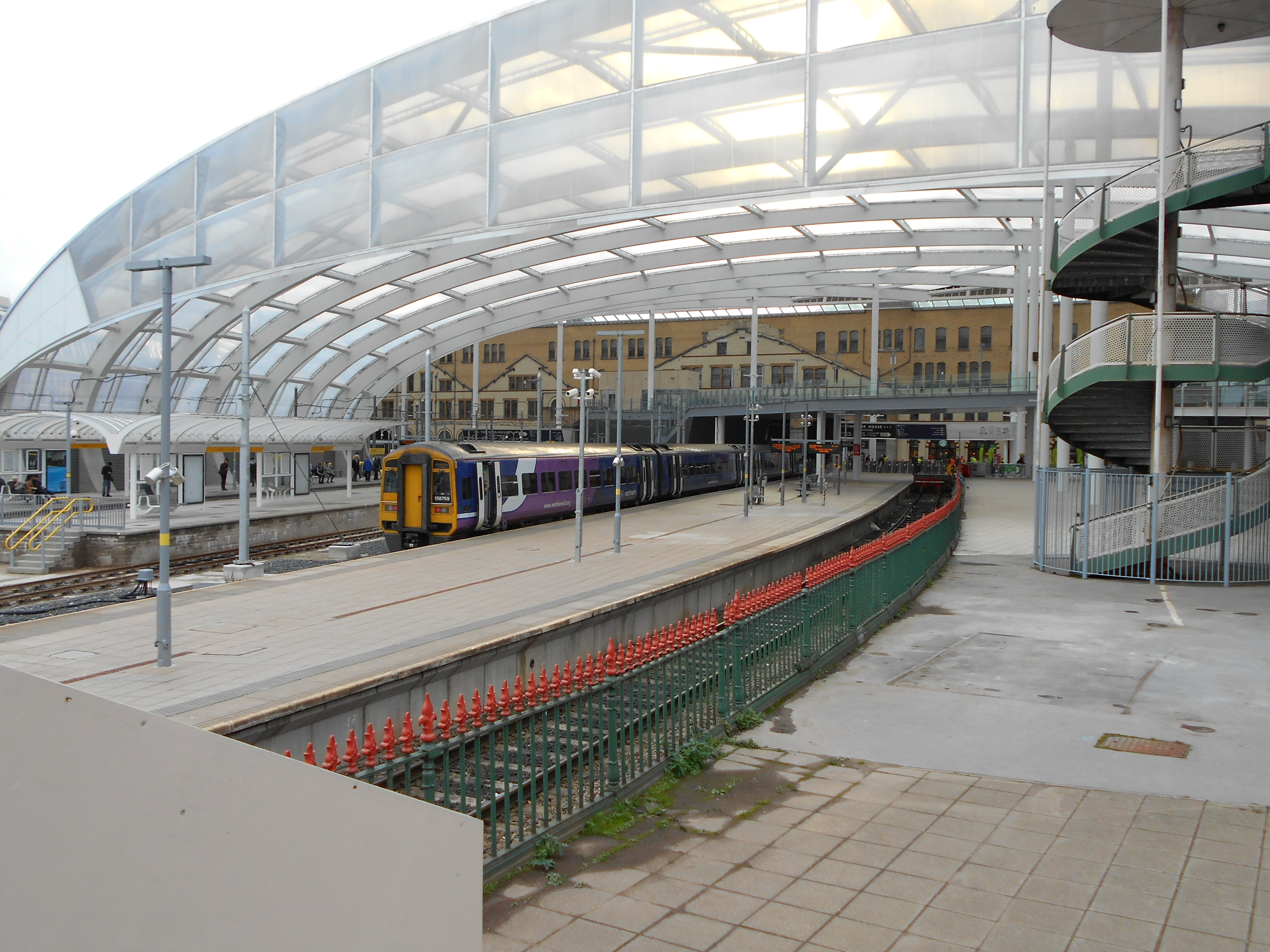
Manchester Victoria station with the new roof

- May: The Todmorden Curve reopened, allowing direct trains to operate between Manchester and east Lancashire. The Curve had been closed in 1965 with the tracks lifted in 1972.
- September: The £350 million Borders Railway opened, restoring rail services to the Scottish Borders which had been the largest area of the UK without a rail link since the Beeching cuts.
- October: As part of the Northern Hub project, Manchester Victoria station reopened after a £44 million upgrade which included a new ETFE roof, electrification and a new Metrolink station with four platforms and three tracks.
- December: Apperley Bridge station reopened, after being closed in 1965. It is the first of two stations between Leeds and Shipley in West Yorkshire to be reopened.
- December: The £26 million new Rochester station opened, replacing the original 1892 station. The new station is closer to the town centre and has longer platforms that can accommodate 12-car trains.

==== 2016 ====
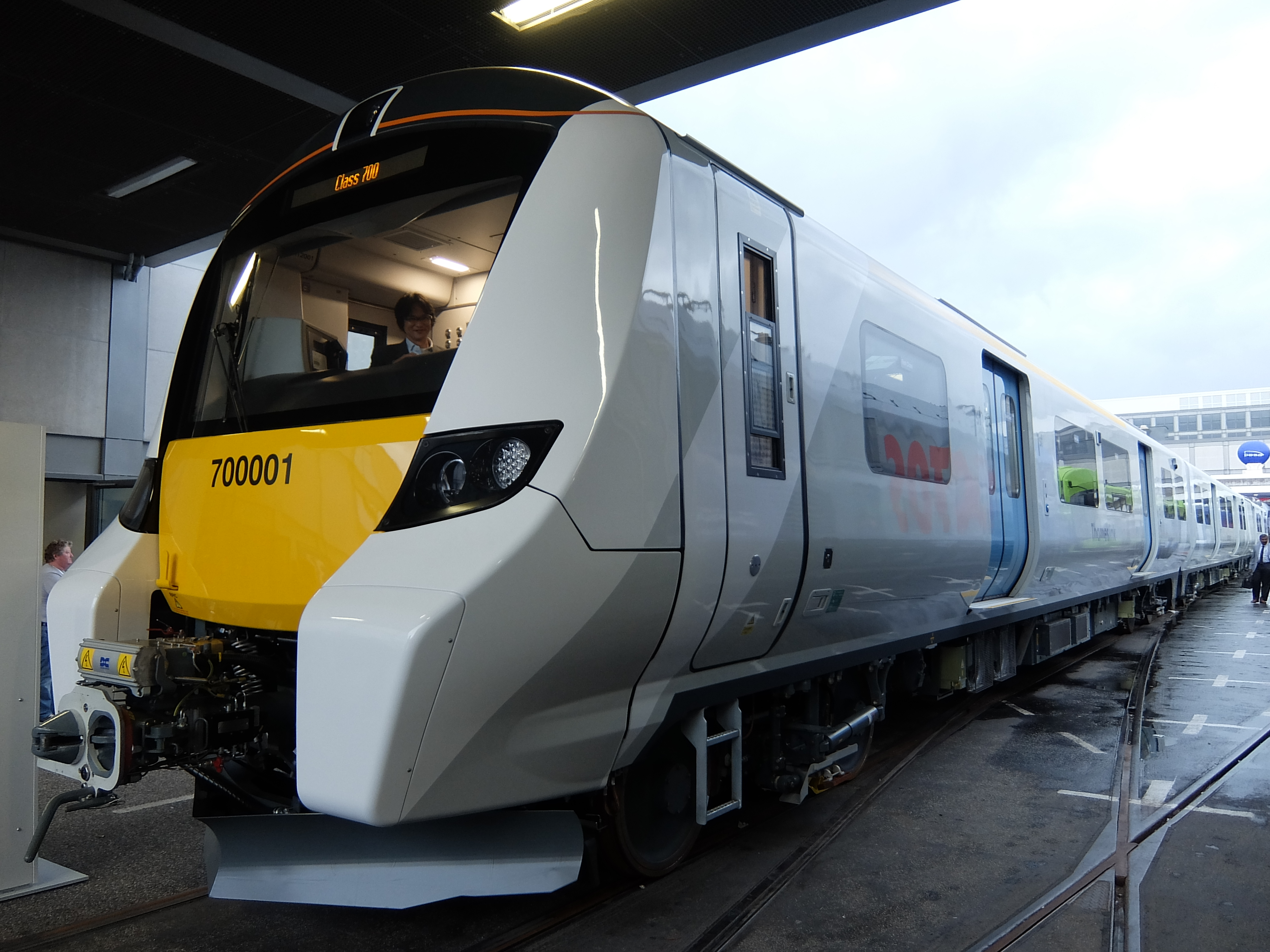
Class 700 Desiro City

- January: As part of the Thameslink Programme, the Borough Market Viaduct opened to passenger services.
- February: The first of 27 Class 387/2 Electrostar units were introduced on the Gatwick Express route between London Victoria and Gatwick Airport, replacing the Class 442s.
- March: The Norton Bridge flyover on the West Coast Main Line was brought into use.
- June: The first of 115 Class 700 Desiro City units entered service on Thameslink.
- June: Kirkstall Forge station opened.
- July: The new Bromsgrove station opened.
- December: The westernmost segment of the western section of East West Rail opened, extending the line from Oxford Parkway to Oxford, and thus establishing a new Oxford-Marylebone service via Bicester Village.

==== 2017 ====
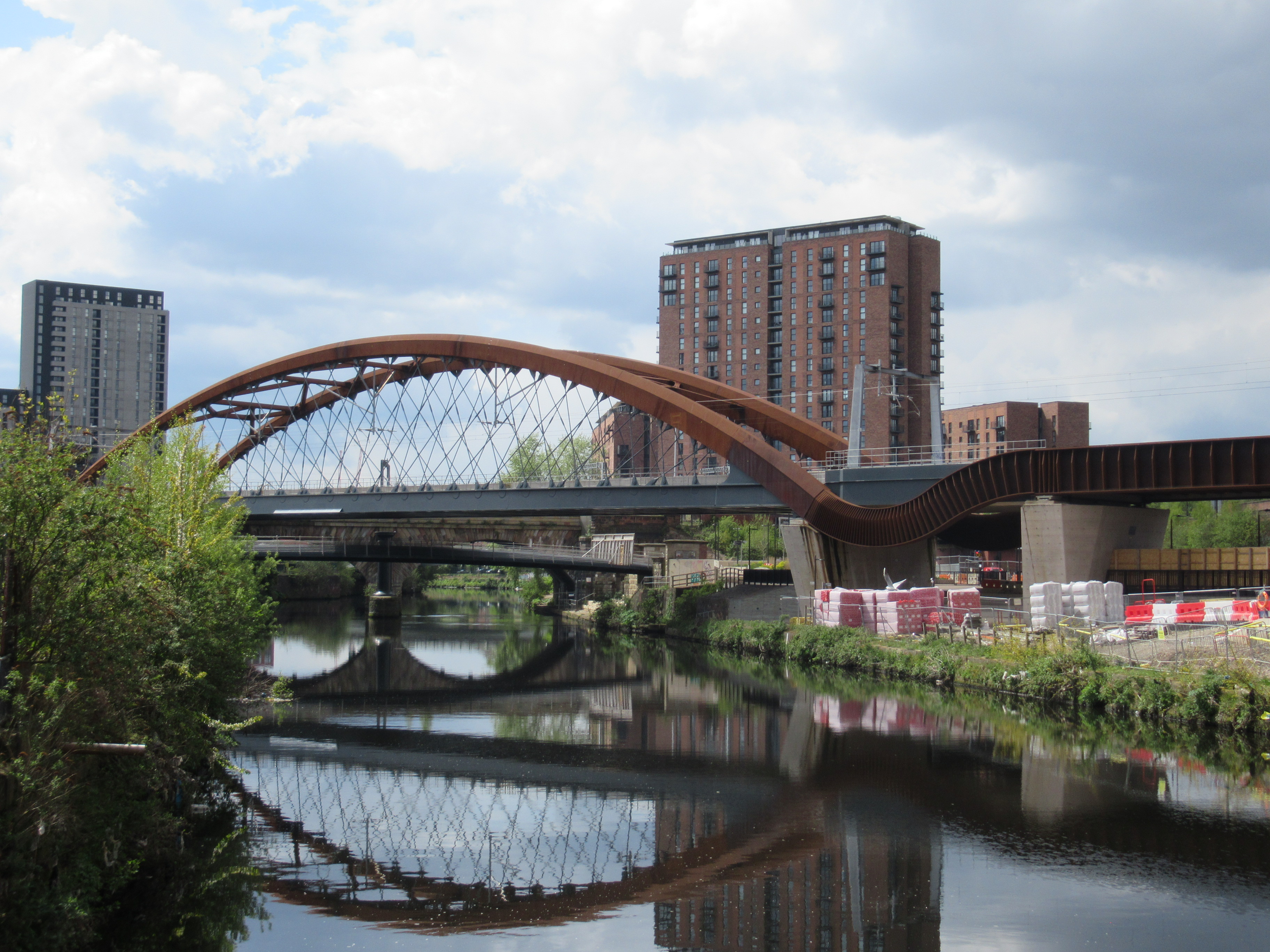
The completed Ordsall Chord

- April: Ilkeston station in Derbyshire, served by trains between Nottingham and Leeds, opened and Low Moor station on the Caldervale line between Bradford and Halifax reopened after being closed in 1965.
- April: Redoubling of track from Rossett to Chester on the Shrewsbury to Chester Line was completed.
- May: Cambridge North station opened.
- May: Electric 387 trains started running between London Paddington and Maidenhead following completion of electrification work.
- June: The first of 66 Class 345 Aventra units entered service on Crossrail. These replaced the 44 TfL Rail Class 315 units that previously operated this service.
- July: A series of upgrades totalling £12 million at Putney was completed, providing longer platforms that can accommodate 10-car trains, step-free access and a new ticket hall.
- August: The first of 30 Class 707 Desiro City units entered service with South West Trains.
- October: The first Class 800 Intercity Express trains were introduced on the Great Western Main Line.
- December: The Ordsall Chord opened to passenger traffic.
- December: As part of the Edinburgh to Glasgow Improvement Programme, the first electric trains ran from Edinburgh to Glasgow via Falkirk High.

==== 2018 ====
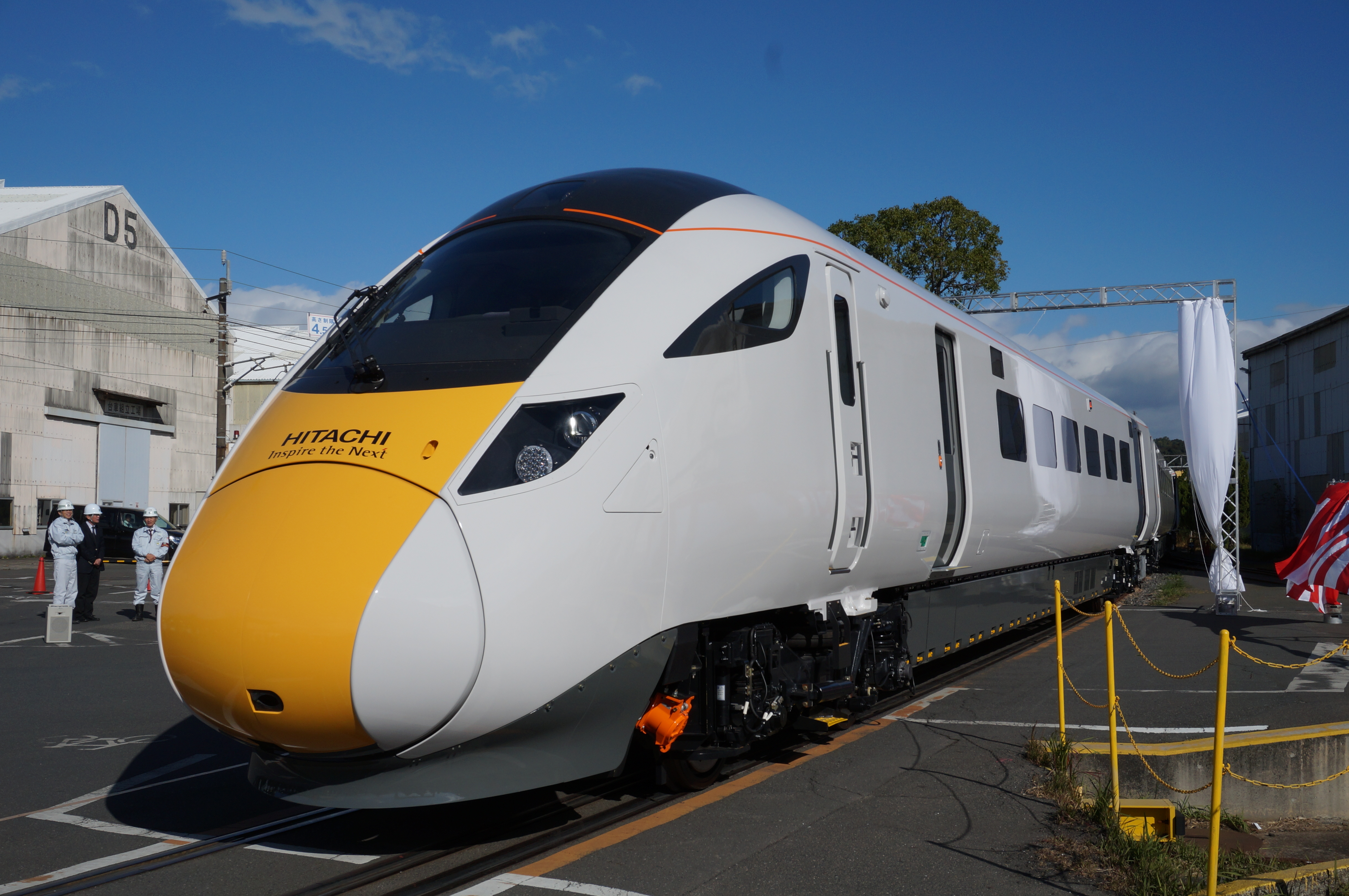
Class 800 Super Express

- January: The line from Preston to Blackpool South including Kirkham and Wesham reopened on time with completely new signaling.
- January: As part of the Thameslink Programme, the redeveloped London Bridge station fully opened, increasing its passenger capacity to 96 million people a year.
- January: Electric trains started running between Paddington and Didcot Parkway following completion of electrification work on this section of the Great Western Main Line.
- January: The first passenger train ran on the completed Bermondsey dive-under.
- March: As part of the Thameslink Programme, automatic train operation entered service on the core Thameslink route between St Pancras and Blackfriars, allowing 20 trains per hour in this section.
- April: Kenilworth station opened on the line between Leamington Spa and Coventry.
- May: The first electric trains ran between Preston and Blackpool North.
- May: Services between Paddington and Heathrow Terminal 4 as well as Heathrow Central and Heathrow Terminal 4 transferred from Heathrow Express to Crossrail.
- May: Resignalling on the Halton Curve that allows trains to travel in both directions (previously trains could only travel on the line in a northbound direction) from Chester to Liverpool Lime Street (via Runcorn) was completed, allowing trains to run from May 2019.
- May: Electrification of the Cross-City Line to Bromsgrove was completed, allowing electric trains to run in July 2018.
- June: Maghull North station opened on Merseyrail's Northern line.
- July: Class 385 electric trains started running on the Edinburgh to Glasgow route.
- August: Class 802 trains entered service with Great Western Railway on certain GWR routes, mainly from London Paddington via Newbury/Exeter St. David's to Plymouth/Penzance.
- August: Mark 5A coaches hauled by Class 68 locomotives began testing on the mainline prior to their introduction with TransPennine Express.
- September: Great Northern started introducing Class 717 trains on services to and from Moorgate.
- December: Electric trains started running on the Stirling-Dunblane-Alloa line.
- December: Four-tracking of the Great Western Main Line at Filton Bank between Dr Days Junction and Filton Abbey Wood was completed.
- December: Platforms 20–22 at Waterloo station, formerly part of Waterloo International, were reopened for South Western Railway services.
- December: Manchester to Preston electrification was completed and Virgin Pendolino test trains ran.

==== 2019 ====
- April: Electrification of the Shotts Line between Edinburgh and Glasgow was completed, allowing electric trains to run from May.
- April: Vivarail Class 230 units started operating on the Marston Vale line for West Midlands Railway.
- April: Mark 5 coaches entered service on the Caledonian Sleeper.
- May: Electric trains started running on the Chase Line to Walsall.
- May: Class 710 Aventra units entered service for London Overground on the Lea Valley Lines, Gospel Oak to Barking Line, Watford DC Line and the Romford to Upminster Line.
- May: The first Class 800 Super Express trains were introduced on the East Coast Main Line.
- June: Refurbished Class 442 units entered service with South Western Railway on London Waterloo to Portsmouth/Southampton services.
- July: The first Class 195 Civity and Class 331 Civity units started running services on Arriva Rail North's network.
- July: Greater Anglia started their complete fleet replacement by introducing their first Class 755 units.
- September: Class 801 units made their debut for London North Eastern Railway on London to Leeds services.
- November: The first of twelve five-car Class 397 Civity trains entered service for TransPennine Express.
- December: Services between Paddington and Reading transferred from Great Western Railway to Crossrail.
- December: Robroyston and Warrington West stations open with the December timetable change.
- December: All of the Pacer (Class 142, Class 143 and Class 144) units were to be withdrawn from service by the end of December 2019 unless they receive modifications to comply with the Disability Discrimination Act of 2005. However, it has been confirmed that some will remain in service past the December 2019 deadline.
- December: The Thameslink Programme is scheduled for completion, allowing for 24 trains per hour between Blackfriars and St Pancras.

==== 2020 ====
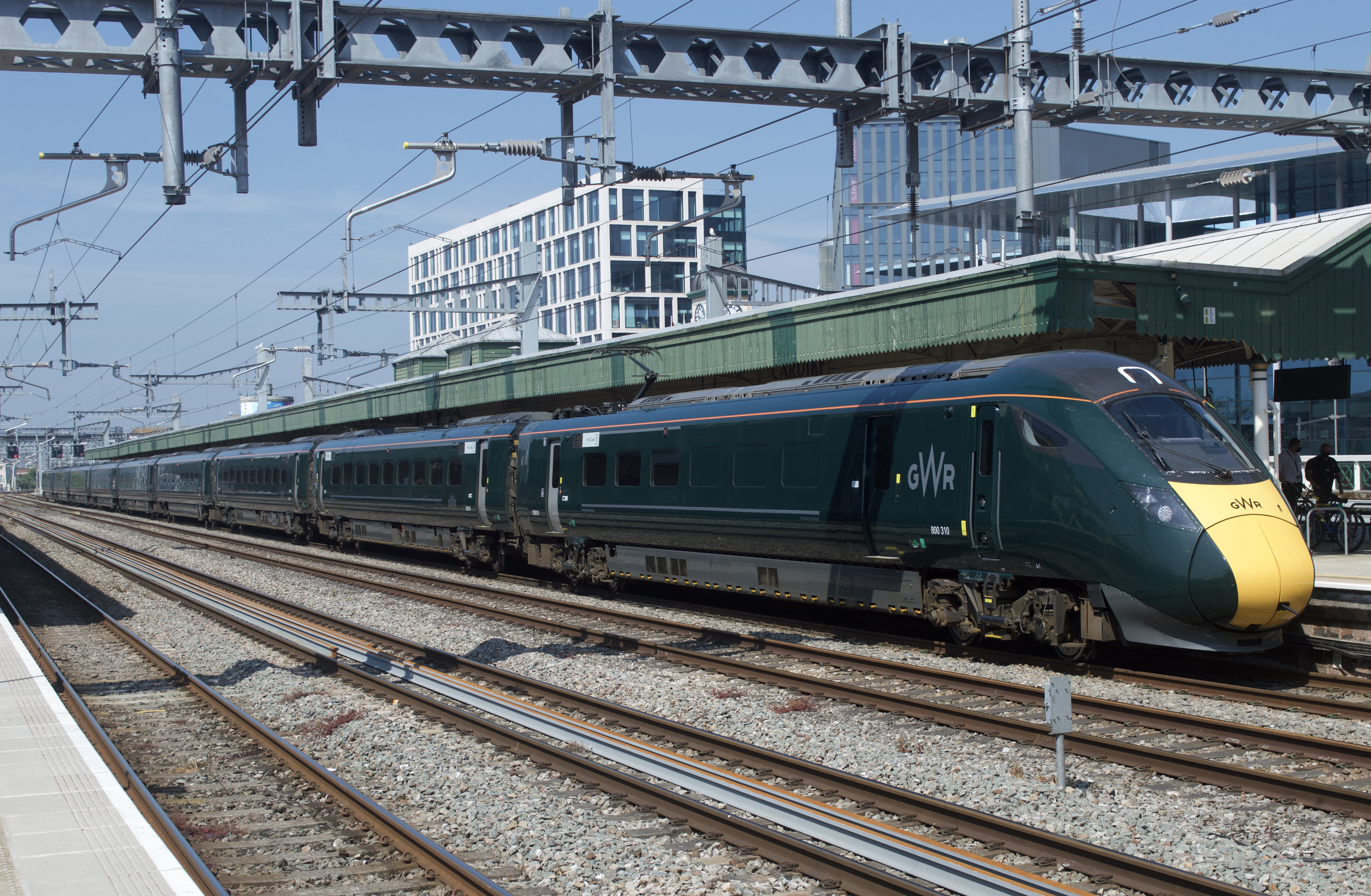
Class 800 at Cardiff Central after electrification of the South Wales Main Line

- January: The first Class 745 trains began operating for Greater Anglia.
- January: The first electric trains ran on the Great Western Main Line to Cardiff.
- February: Worcestershire Parkway railway station opened.
- November: Greater Anglia introduced the Class 720 into service.
- December: Heathrow Express introduced a new fleet of a dozen refurbished Class 387s.

==== 2021 ====
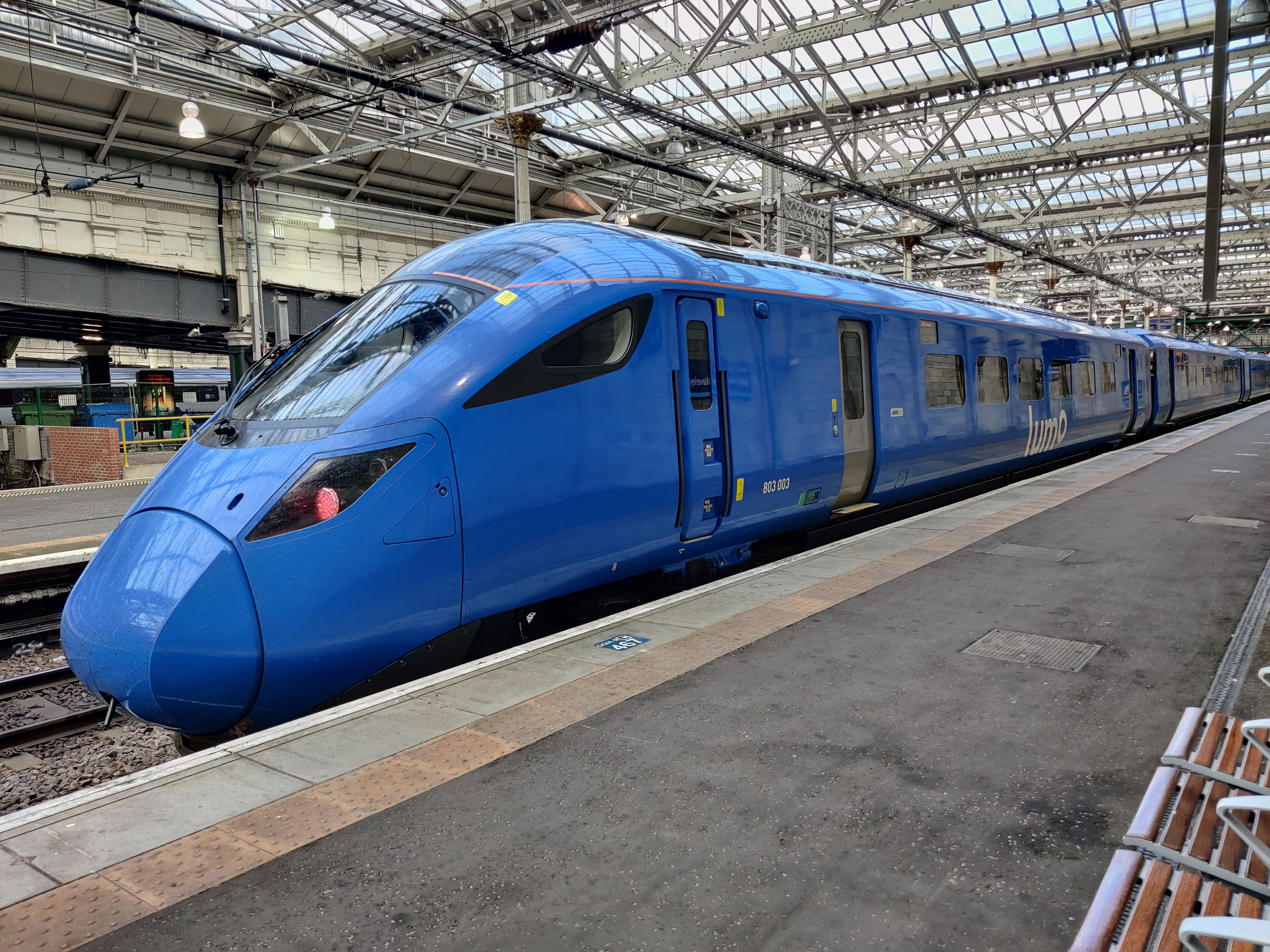
Class 803 operated by Lumo at Edinburgh Waverley

- January: Electrification of the Midland Main Line to Corby is completed.
- April: As part of the East Coast Upgrade, the disused eastern Gasworks Tunnel reopened to traffic.
- May: Class 769 bi-mode units converted from electric Class 319 trains were introduced into service with Northern.
- May: The final Pacer unit (a Class 143) ran its final service for Transport for Wales.
- October: Open access operator Lumo started running services on the ECML.
- November: As part of the Restoring Your Railway programme, the £40.5 million Dartmoor line reopened to regular passenger services.
- December: Kettering to Market Harborough electrification officially announced and starts.
- December: Work starts on Bolton (Lostock) to Wigan upgrade and electrification.
- December: Soham railway station reopened.

==== 2022 ====
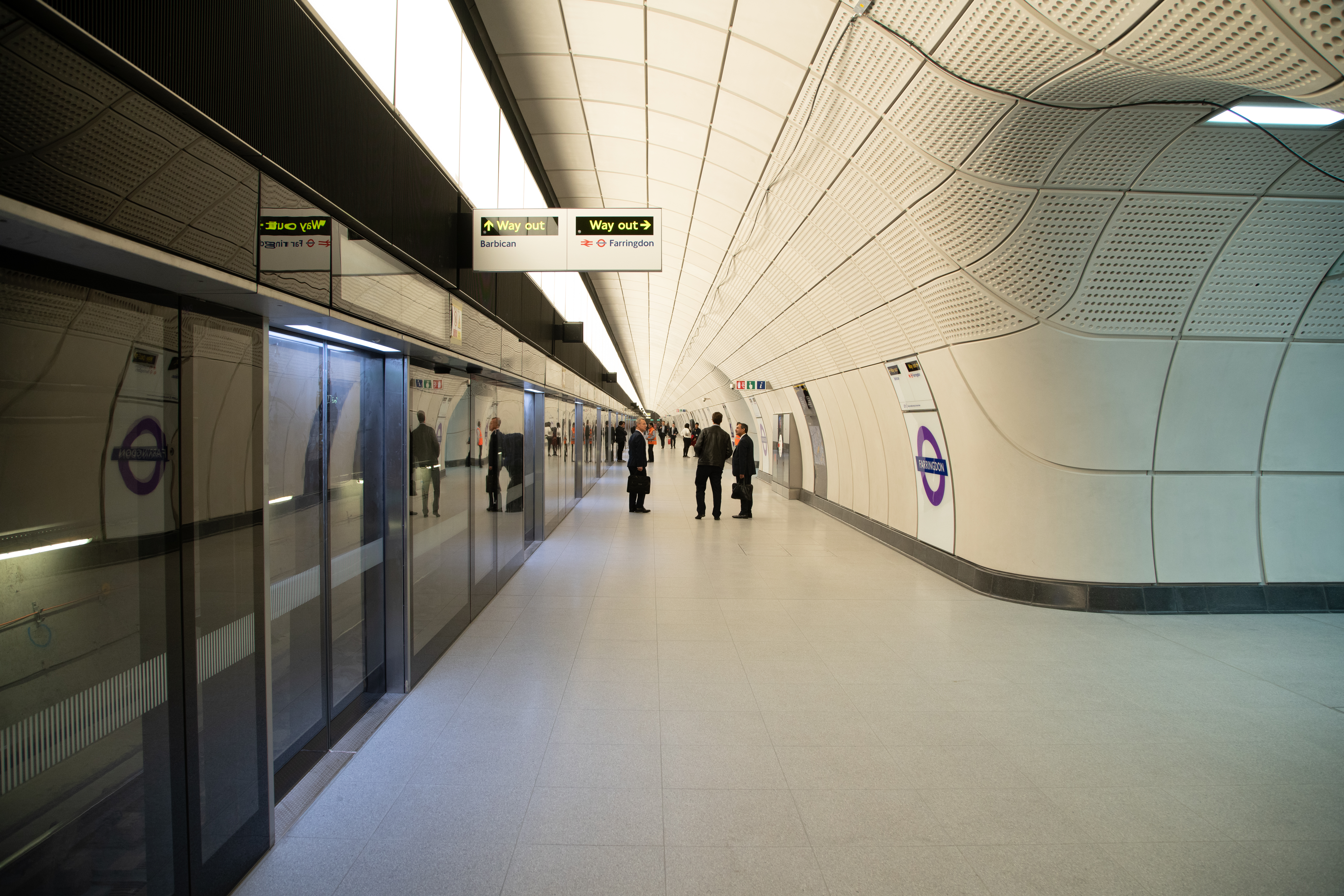
Crossrail platform at Farringdon

- May: The central section of Crossrail (Paddington to Abbey Wood), now called the Elizabeth line, was opened by Elizabeth II.
- July: Barking Riverside station opened on the Gospel Oak to Barking line.
- October: West Midlands Trains started introducing their new fleet of Class 196 trains.
- November: CAF Class 197 Civity DMUs began entering service with Transport for Wales Rail.

==== 2023 ====
- January: Class 231 FLIRT trains began operating with Transport for Wales Rail.
- January: Merseyrail started introducing the first of 52 new four-car Class 777 trains to replace their three-car Class 507 and Class 508 trains.
- February: Inverness Airport railway station opens.
- May: Reading Green Park opens.
- July: Marsh Barton railway station opens.
- July: Thanet Parkway railway station opens.
- August: Great Western Railway began operating trains from Portway Park and Ride railway station.
- September: c2c started introducing their new fleet of six 10-car Bombardier Class 720 trains.
- November: West Midlands Trains introduced the first Class 730 trains
- December: Brent Cross West station opened on the Thameslink route in North London.

==== 2024 ====
- January: South Western Railway began introducing their new Class 701 trains.
- June: Class 805 trains began operating with Avanti West Coast
- June: The first train controlled using ETCS signalling ran on the East Coast Main Line.
- October: New governments first budget confirms support for the TransPennine Upgrade project.
- November: Class 756 FLIRT trains began operating with Transport for Wales Rail
- November: Avanti West Coast began introducing their new fleet of Class 807 units.
- December: Passenger services were re-introduced on the Northumberland Line after 60 years of freight-only use.

==== 2025 ====
- July: Bolton (Lostock) to Wigan electrification was completed, although originally scheduled for 2024.
- December: Class 810 units came into service for East Midlands Railway.
- December: Electrification to East Kilbride was completed

==== 2026 ====
- March: New stations opened at Willenhall and Darlaston
- April: New stations opened at Kings Heath, Pineapple Road and Moseley Village, all in Birmingham.
- June: Stadler Class 398 Citylink tram-trains began operating with Transport for Wales Rail.
- June: Cambridge South station opened.
- August: Okehampton Interchange opened.
- September: The first passenger trains ran between Welwyn and Hitchin on the East Coast Main Line using ETCS operation, meaning no lineside signals are needed.. Balgary station opened.

=== Future improvements ===
==== 2026 ====
- December: Services are due to start running on the western section of the East West Rail from Oxford to Bletchley. These were originally planned to start by the end of 2025, but due to a dispute over driver-only operation, this was delayed to December 2026.

==== 2027 ====
- LNER plan to introduce their new Class 897 trains on the East Coast Main Line.

==== 2028 ====
- Grand Central will start operating their new tri-mode Class 820 units.

==== 2029 ====
- Partial electrification will be finished on the Borders Railway, enabling battery-electric trains to run from 2031.

==== 2030 ====
- Trains will start running between Oxford and Bedford as part of East West Rail.
- Northern Trains will start introducing a fleet of 450 new trains.

==== 2032 ====
- The last section of the Transpennine Route Upgrade will complete, allowing electric trains to run.

==== Uncertain ====
- HS2, originally planned to open in 2033, has been delayed to an uncertain date.

== See also ==
- Campaign to Bring Back British Rail
- Campaign to Electrify Britain's Railway
- Financing of the rail industry in Great Britain
- History of rail transport in Great Britain
- History of rail transport in Great Britain 1948–1994
- Northern Powerhouse Rail
- Transport for the North
- UK Ultraspeed
- West Coast Main Line route modernisation
