= Average weekly earnings =

Labour-market measure

In the United Kingdom and in Australia, the Average Weekly Earnings (AWE) is the lead indicator of short-term changes in earnings. In the UK, it replaced the Average Earnings Index (AEI) as the lead measure of short-term earnings growth in January 2010.

In Australia, the average weekly earnings is calculated and published twice-yearly by the Australian Bureau of Statistics. It looks at weekly earnings across states and territories; industries; and public and private sectors. The ABS Average Weekly Earnings survey is designed to measure the level of average earnings in Australia at a point in time. Movements in average weekly earnings can be affected by changes in both the level of earnings per employee and in the composition of the labour force. Factors which can contribute to compositional change include variations in the proportion of full-time, part-time, casual and junior employees; variations in the occupational distribution within and across industries; and variations in the distribution of employment between industries.

== See also ==
- Consumer price index
- Retail Price Index
