= IHS =

IHS may refer to:

== Religious ==
- Christogram IHS or ΙΗΣ, a monogram symbolizing Jesus Christ
- In hoc signo, used by Roman emperor Constantine the Great

== Organizations ==
- Indian Health Service, an operating division of the US Department of Health and Human Services
- Dictaphone company division for healthcare dictating applications
- IHS Markit, a data publishing company (originally Information Handling Services) that originated in 1959, and has since merged with Markit

=== Institutes ===
- Institute for Housing and Urban Development Studies, an international institute
- Institute for Humane Studies, a US educational organization
- Institute for Humanist Studies, a think tank based in Washington, DC

=== Societies ===
- Indiana Historical Society, a historical society in the US
- International Headache Society, organisation for professionals helping people affected by headache
- International Horn Society, organization dedicated to horn-players
- Ipswich Historical Society, in Ipswich, Massachusetts, US

=== Schools ===
- Independence High School (Arizona), US
- Independence High School (San Jose, California)
- Irondequoit High School, Irondequoit, New York, US
- Irvine High School, Irvine, California, US
- Issaquah High School, Issaquah, Washington, US
- The Indian High School, Dubai, United Arab Emirates
- Interlake High School, Bellevue, Washington, US
- Ithaca High School, Ithaca, New York, US

== Technology ==
- Intensity, hue, saturation, in the HSL color space
- IBM HTTP Server, a web server
- Integrated Heat Spreader, a heat spreader that serves as an interface between a chip and a heat sink

== Other uses ==
- Integrated Household Survey, a survey comprising multiple surveys in the United Kingdom
- Interstate Highway System, a road network in the United States
- Ironclads: High Seas, a naval simulator computer game
