= Diesel train =

A diesel train may refer to:

- Diesel locomotive
- Diesel multiple unit

== See also ==
- Diesel Trains Ltd, a British company set up by the Department of Transportation in 2009
