= RPIX =

Measure of inflation

RPIX is a measure of inflation in the United Kingdom, equivalent to the all items Retail Price Index (RPI) excluding mortgage interest payments.

== History ==
It was the UK's target rate of inflation from October 1992 to December 2003. From June 1997, the Bank of England was given the task of setting interest rates to meet an inflation target of 2.5 per cent on the RPIX measure.

Mortgage interest payments were excluded from the inflation target because otherwise the Bank's behaviour would be distorted. Any rate rise from the Bank, aimed at bringing inflation lower, would have the side effect of raising interest payments on variable-rate mortgages, causing higher inflation on any broad measure such as RPI. Targeting RPI would thus create a vicious circle of higher rates, something avoided by using RPIX as the target.

In December 2003 the Bank's target measure was changed to the Consumer Price Index, or CPI, and the target was set at 2 per cent.

== Publication ==
The RPIX continues to be published each month by the Office for National Statistics (ONS).

== See also ==
- Consumer price index, which provides an international overview
