= Average earnings index =

British labour-market measure

In the United Kingdom, the average earnings index (AEI) was an indicator of inflationary pressures emanating from the labour market.

The AEI was replaced by the average weekly earnings (AWE) as the lead measure of short-term earnings growth in January 2010.

== See also ==
- Consumer price index
- Retail price index
