= Pollyanna Creep =

Pollyanna Creep is a term that originated in 2004 with John Williams, a California-based economic analyst and statistician. It describes the way the U.S. government has modified the way important economic measures are calculated with the purpose of giving a more optimistic impression of economic development. This is a clear reference, in a sarcastic way, to Pollyanna's proverbial optimism. Williams and other economic analysts, such as Kevin P. Phillips, argue that such manipulations distort the perception of electors and economic factors and have ill effects on political and investment decisions.

== United Kingdom ==
Concern about the manipulation of statistics also exists in the United Kingdom. For example, inflation in the price of certain essentials (such as food and fuel) is far higher than that of the published consumer price index. The more reasonable answer to this seeming conundrum is that food and fuel make up a relatively small proportion of overall average household expenditure (about 10% for food consumed at home, 5% for home fuel, 5% for car fuel). This is because although these make up a larger proportion of expenditure in a typical week, inflation consumption weights account for all expenditure, even those large items purchased only infrequently (e.g. motor vehicles, furniture, electronics, clothes, etc.) but that when purchased are very large commitments. Prices of these goods have risen much less quickly or have, in some cases, fallen.
