= Consumer price index in the United Kingdom =

Official measure of inflation in the UK

UK annual rate of RPI, CPI, and CPIH RPI CPI CPIH (CPI+OOH)

The consumer price index in the United Kingdom is a family of official price indices produced by the Office for National Statistics (ONS) that measure changes over time in the prices of goods and services purchased by households. The main indices are the Consumer Prices Index (CPI), the Consumer Prices Index including owner occupiers' housing costs (CPIH) and the Retail Prices Index (RPI). CPI and CPIH are constructed from a representative "basket" of around 700 goods and services with about 180,000 price quotations collected each month from shops and online outlets across the United Kingdom.

Since March 2017, CPIH has been the ONS's lead measure of UK consumer price inflation, because it extends CPI by including owner occupiers' housing costs and Council Tax. CPI continues to be produced to international standards and is used for the government's inflation target, which is set at 2% a year on CPI. If inflation moves more than one percentage point away from the target, the governor of the Bank of England is required to write an open letter to the Chancellor of the Exchequer explaining the reasons and the Monetary Policy Committee's response.

The traditional measure of inflation in the United Kingdom was the RPI, which provides official estimates of consumer price inflation from 1947 onwards, and continues to be used in some long-term contracts, including index-linked government bonds and certain pension and rail fare uprating formulas. However, the statistics authorities and the ONS have concluded that RPI has significant methodological weaknesses, including an upward bias partly related to the formula used to combine individual price quotes, and it lost its status as a National Statistic in 2013. RPI is now treated as a legacy index and the UK Statistics Authority and ONS strongly discourage its use when CPIH or CPI is available.

Debate over the choice of index has had implications for monetary policy, public finances and private contracts. A 2019 report by the House of Lords Economic Affairs Committee criticised the continued widespread use of RPI, highlighted the scope for "index shopping", when different indices are used for government receipts and payments, and recommended that the government and statistical authorities move towards a single general measure of inflation for official use.

== History ==
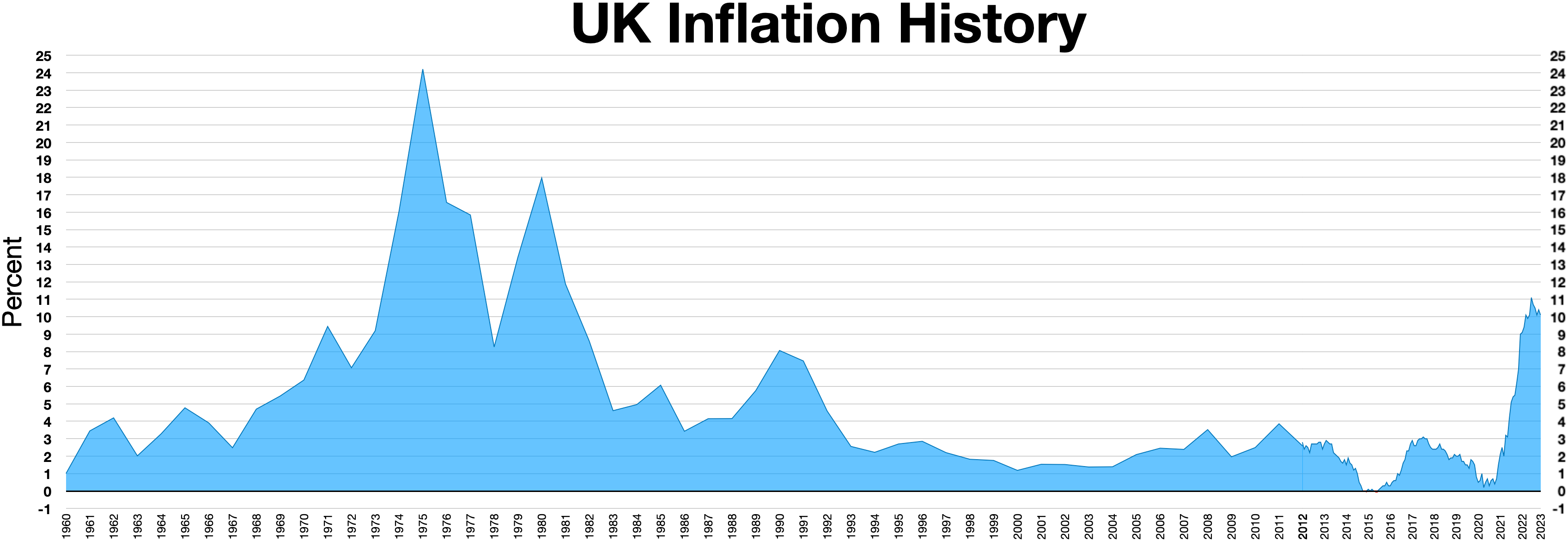
UK inflation history

Modern UK consumer price statistics are rooted in the Retail Prices Index (RPI). The RPI was developed from an index designed as a compensation measure to protect workers from price increases associated with the First World War. It provides published estimates of inflation from 1947 onwards, and the first official release of consumer price inflation based on the index was produced in January 1956.

Inflation rose sharply in the 1970s, with the annual rate of increase in the RPI peaking at about 24% in 1975. High and volatile inflation contributed to the 1976 sterling crisis, and to the wider economic and industrial unrest that led to in the Winter of Discontent.

From the 1970s onwards a range of derivatives of the RPI were introduced to capture different concepts of inflation. These included measures that excluded mortgage interest payments or indirect taxes, such as RPIX (RPI excluding mortgage interest payments), which were intended to provide a better measure of underlying inflation pressures than headline RPI.

=== RPIX ===
An explicit inflation target was first announced in October 1992 by Chancellor of the Exchequer Norman Lamont, following the United Kingdom’s departure from the European Exchange Rate Mechanism. The target was expressed as a range for annual inflation in RPIX of 1% to 4%, with the intention that inflation should be kept in the lower half of that range over the life of the Parliament. In June 1995 this was replaced by a point target of 2.5% for RPIX inflation.

In May 1997 the incoming Labour government gave the Bank of England operational independence and established the Monetary Policy Committee (MPC). The MPC was made responsible for setting interest rates in order to meet the government’s 2.5% RPIX inflation target, while the Chancellor continued to define the target itself.

=== Introduction of CPI ===
As part of a wider move to harmonise measures of consumer price inflation across the European Union, the UK introduced the Harmonised Index of Consumer Prices (HICP) in the mid-1990s. The index was first published in 1997. In December 2003 the National Statistician decided that the UK version of the HICP would be renamed the Consumer Prices Index (CPI) in National Statistics publications.

At the Pre-Budget Report in December 2003, the Chancellor of the Exchequer announced that the inflation target for monetary policy would switch from 2.5% annual inflation in RPIX to 2% annual inflation in CPI, with effect from 2004. Since then, the Monetary Policy Committee has set interest rates with the aim of keeping CPI inflation at 2% in the medium term, and must explain deviations of more than one percentage point from the target in an open letter to the Chancellor of the Exchequer.

=== CPIH ===
In March 2013 the Office for National Statistics introduced the Consumer Prices Index including owner occupiers’ housing costs (CPIH), constructed on the same basis as CPI, but including a measure of owner occupiers’ housing costs and Council Tax. CPIH was initially designated a National Statistic, but this status was suspended in 2014 because of concerns about the methods and processing of the private rents data used to estimate owner occupiers’ housing costs.

Following methodological improvements and a reassessment by the UK Statistics Authority, the National Statistics status of CPIH was reinstated on 31 July 2017. On 21 March 2017, the ONS had already restructured its consumer price inflation publications so that CPIH became its lead measure of UK consumer price inflation, while CPI continued to be used for the government’s inflation target and for international comparisons. In parallel, the publication of RPI-related statistics was scaled back and the RPI was explicitly treated as a legacy index that should not be used for new purposes, reflecting official concerns about its methodology and upward bias.

== Implementation ==
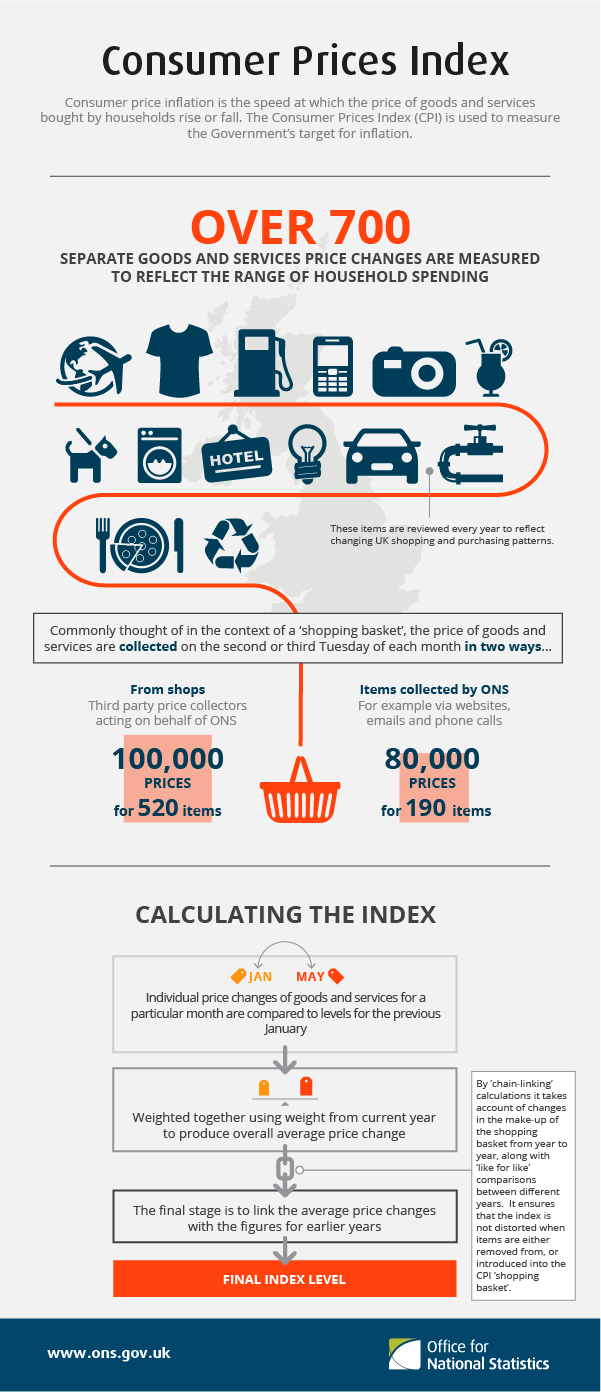
Shortened version of the ONS infographic

The CPI measures the average price increase, expressed as a percentage, for a basket of 700 goods and services. Around the middle of each month it collects information on prices of these commodities from 120,000 different retailing outlets.

Unlike the RPI, the CPI takes the geometric mean of prices to aggregate items at the lowest levels, instead of the arithmetic mean. This means that the CPI will generally be lower than the RPI. The rationale is that this accounts for the fact that consumers will buy less of something if its price goes up, and more if its price goes down. It also ensures that if prices go up and then revert to the previous level, the CPI also reverts to its previous level (which is not the case with the calculation method used for the RPI). The Government Actuary's Department estimates this difference in averaging method accounts for about 0.9% of the average 1.15% annual difference between CPI and RPI.

The change in the CPI over the 12 months to August 2008 was 4.7%, while the corresponding figure for RPIX (which excludes mortgage interest) was 5.2% and that for RPI (which includes mortgage interest) was 4.8%. The CPI, the RPIX, and the RPI are published monthly by the Office for National Statistics (ONS). A history of CPI and RPIX going back to 1989 can be found at the ONS website.

== Role in government policy ==
UK consumer price indices play a central role in economic policy and in the indexation of public and private payments. Since 2004 the government’s formal inflation target has been defined in terms of the 12-month rate of change in CPI, set at 2% a year. The Monetary Policy Committee of the Bank of England sets Bank rate with the aim of meeting this target in the medium term and must write an open letter to the Chancellor of the Exchequer if inflation deviates by more than one percentage point from the target.

Beyond monetary policy, CPI and CPIH are used widely across the public sector for indexation of tax and benefit parameters, public service charges and other payments. Examples include uprating of certain social security benefits and tax credits, some tax thresholds and elements of public sector pay and pensions. The choice of index affects the public finances because CPI and CPIH have generally risen more slowly than RPI over long periods.

RPI, although no longer a National Statistic and officially treated as a legacy measure, continues to be used in a number of important contracts and formulae. These include most outstanding index-linked gilts, many defined benefit occupational pension schemes and some regulated prices, such as certain rail fares. Because RPI inflation has typically been higher than CPI or CPIH inflation, this has implications for the distribution of costs and benefits between the government, investors and households.

The coexistence of several indices and the continued use of RPI despite its recognised shortcomings have been criticised in Parliament and by some commentators. A 2019 report by the House of Lords Economic Affairs Committee argued that the use of different indices for government receipts and payments created opportunities for “index shopping” and recommended that the government move towards a single, coherent measure of consumer price inflation for most official purposes. In 2020 the government and UK Statistics Authority confirmed that, subject to the outcome of a consultation, the methods and data sources of CPIH would be brought into RPI from 2030, while the index would continue to be published under its existing name, reflecting its extensive use in long-term contracts.

== Public perception and culture ==
The idea of a “shopping basket” of goods and services has become one of the most visible aspects of UK inflation statistics. Each year the Office for National Statistics publishes changes to the basket used for CPIH, CPI and RPI to keep it representative of consumer spending patterns, and these updates are widely reported as illustrations of how everyday habits and technologies are changing.

Individual changes to the basket sometimes attract media attention as symbols of wider social trends. For example, in March 2009 rosé wine and takeaway chicken were added to the inflation basket, while volume bottled cider and boxes of wine were removed, a shift reported as reflecting changing tastes in food and drink.

== See also ==
- Pollyanna Creep
- 1976 sterling crisis
- 2021–present United Kingdom cost of living crisis
- Gilt-edged securities
