= Living Costs and Food Survey =

UK household expenditure survey

The Living Costs and Food Survey (LCF) is a survey carried out in the United Kingdom by the Office for National Statistics (ONS). It is carried out on a calendar year basis and collects information on expenditure of goods and services for private households. The survey is primarily designed to collect expenditure information, however it also gathers information about the income of household members.

The results of the survey are multi purpose, however it is primarily used to provide information for the Retail Prices Index and the National Accounts estimates of household expenditure, as well as analysis of the effect of taxes and benefits.

The Living Costs and Food Survey also collects specialist food data, which is used and sponsored by the Department for Environment, Food and Rural Affairs (DEFRA). While the ONS Social Surveys Division report the income and expenditure data, the DEFRA publish the detailed food and nutritional data.

== History ==
In 2008 The Expenditure and Food Survey (EFS) became a module of the Integrated Household Survey (IHS) and was renamed as the Living Costs and Food Survey (LCF). The EFS was the result of the amalgamation of the Family Expenditure Survey (FES) and the National Food Survey (NFS) in 2001.

== Methodology ==
The LCF is a continuous survey, with interviews being spread evenly over the year to ensure that seasonal effects are covered.

The LCF has a sample size of approximately 6,000 responding households per year. The households are visited by an interviewer, and information is collected about income and regular expenditure, such as household bills and mortgage payments. Retrospective information on certain large, infrequent expenditures such as those on vehicles is also collected. Answers for children aged 15 years and younger are given by proxy by another household member.

Every individual aged 16 and over in the household visited is also asked to keep a diary that records daily expenditure for two weeks. The diary is where the specialist food data used by the DEFRA is collected. Since 1998–99 the results have also included information from simplified diaries kept by children aged between 7 and 15.

== Survey results and data ==
ONS produce an annual 'Family Spending' publication, which gives a broad overview of the results of the survey. It also provides detailed information about some aspects of expenditure.

The Family Spending 2009 Edition, released in November 2010, found that the average household spend fell from £471 per week in 2008 to £455 in 2009. This was the first fall in average household spend since 2001-02, when the current system of measuring was introduced to allow better international comparisons.

Anonymised microdata from the Living Costs and Food Survey (LCF), the Expenditure and Food Survey (EFS) and the Family Expenditure Survey (FES) are available from the Economic and Social Data Service (ESDS), a service of the UK Data Archive. Details on how to access these datasets can be found at the UK Data Archive.
