= Arnside Viaduct =

Railway bridge in Cumbria, England

Coordinates: 54.2054°N 2.8390°W

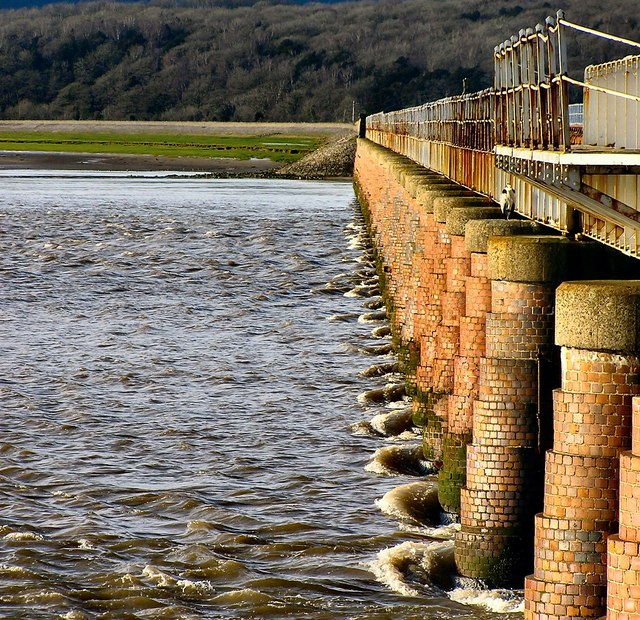
Arnside Viaduct in 2007

Arnside Viaduct is a viaduct carrying the Lancaster to Barrow railway line over the River Kent. Construction started in 1856, finished in 1857 and expanded to a two-track railway in 1863. It received a major upgrade and repair in the 21st century. It is approximately 505 meters long, with a total of 51 piers. It is situated where the River Kent disgorges into Morecambe Bay. It is located in the county of Cumbria but very close to the county of Lancashire border. It is cited as a major tourist attraction. As it goes over the River Kent, it is sometimes referred to as the Kent Viaduct. It is notable in that it was the first viaduct in the world to use water jetting to dig the piles in construction. It was substantially rebuilt and strengthened in 1915 to allow wartime supplies to and from Barrow.

== 21st-century reconstruction and repair ==
Because of its age and its being in an estuary that is also subject to bore tides, the viaduct deteriorated over time, and so speed limits were imposed on trains. Although the bore is smaller than the River Severn, there is considerable turbulence at the viaduct. This combination of factors meant a major repair was due, but this could not be done without a total blockade and closure. The viaduct also has further restrictions in that it is in an area of Special Scientific Interest and also a National Park. The Arnside and Silverdale location is an Area of Outstanding Natural Beauty. A 16-week line closure was thus planned for 2011. As part of the upgrade and repair, jointed rails were replaced by continuously welded rail reducing the noise and enabling quieter journeys. The journey times were also reduced. The closure was 16 weeks duration.

Money was later made available to allow construction of a walking and cycling path across the viaduct.

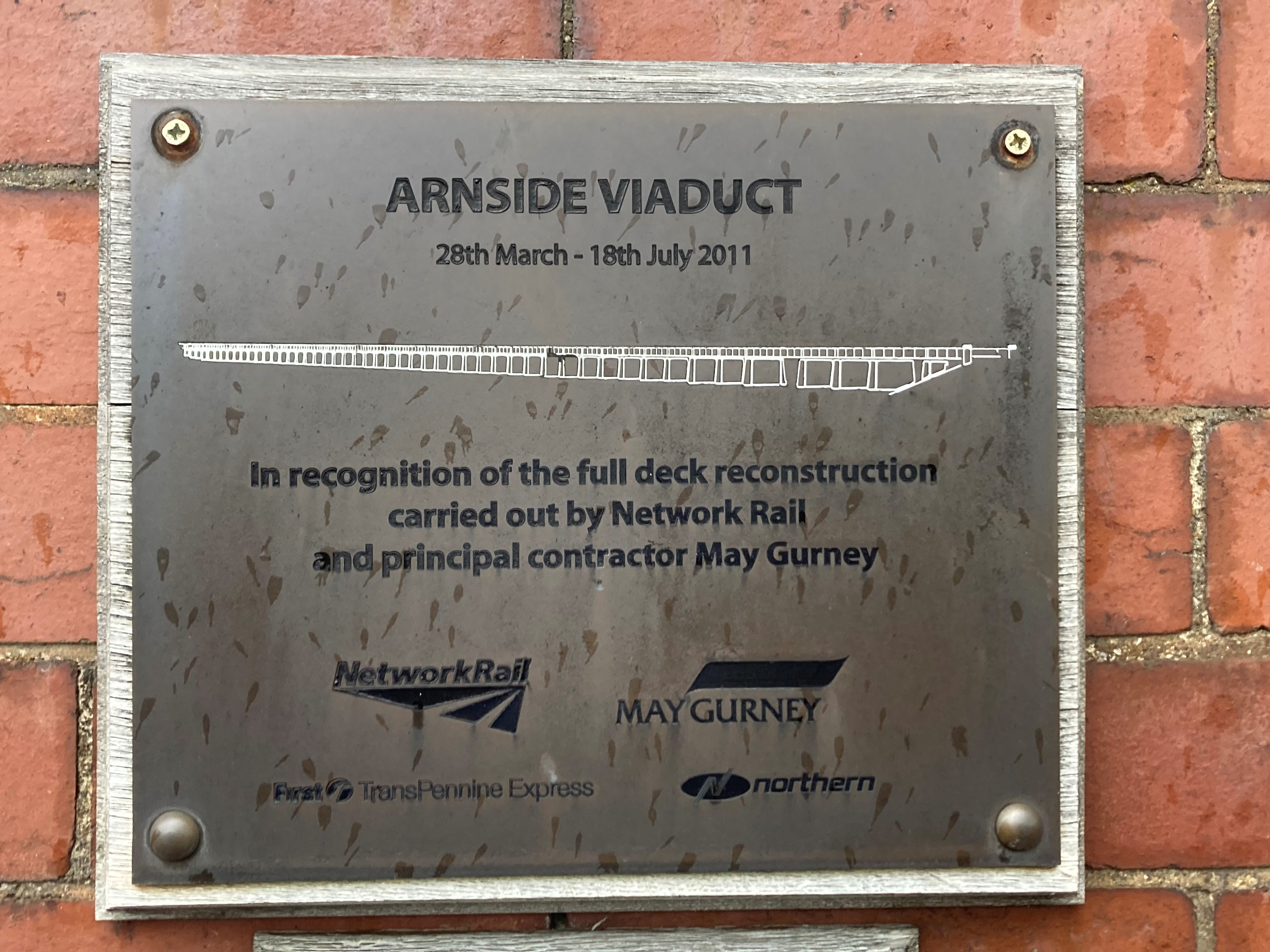
Arnside Viaduct - memorial plaque to the project with construction dates

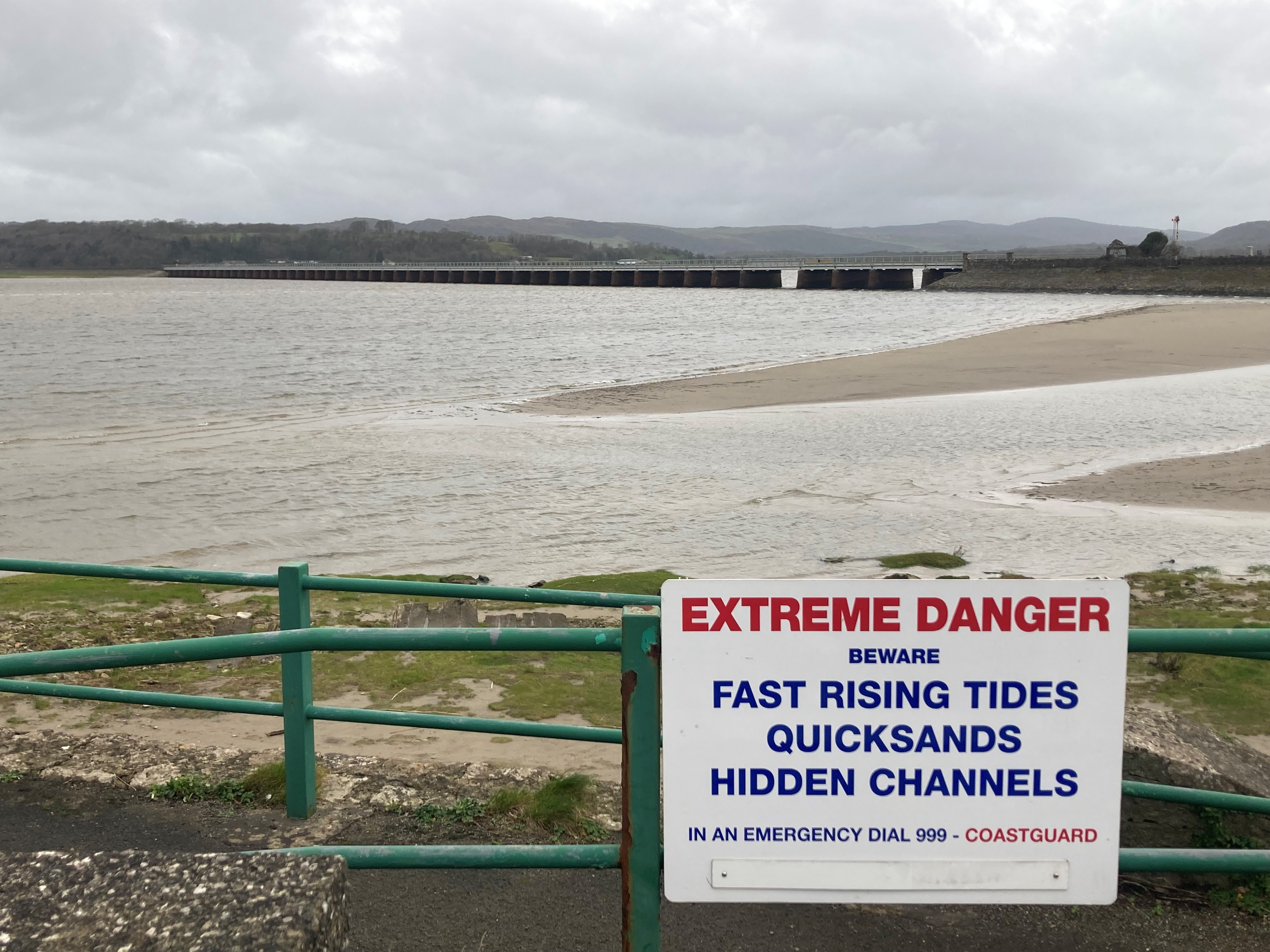
Arnside Viaduct -tide out

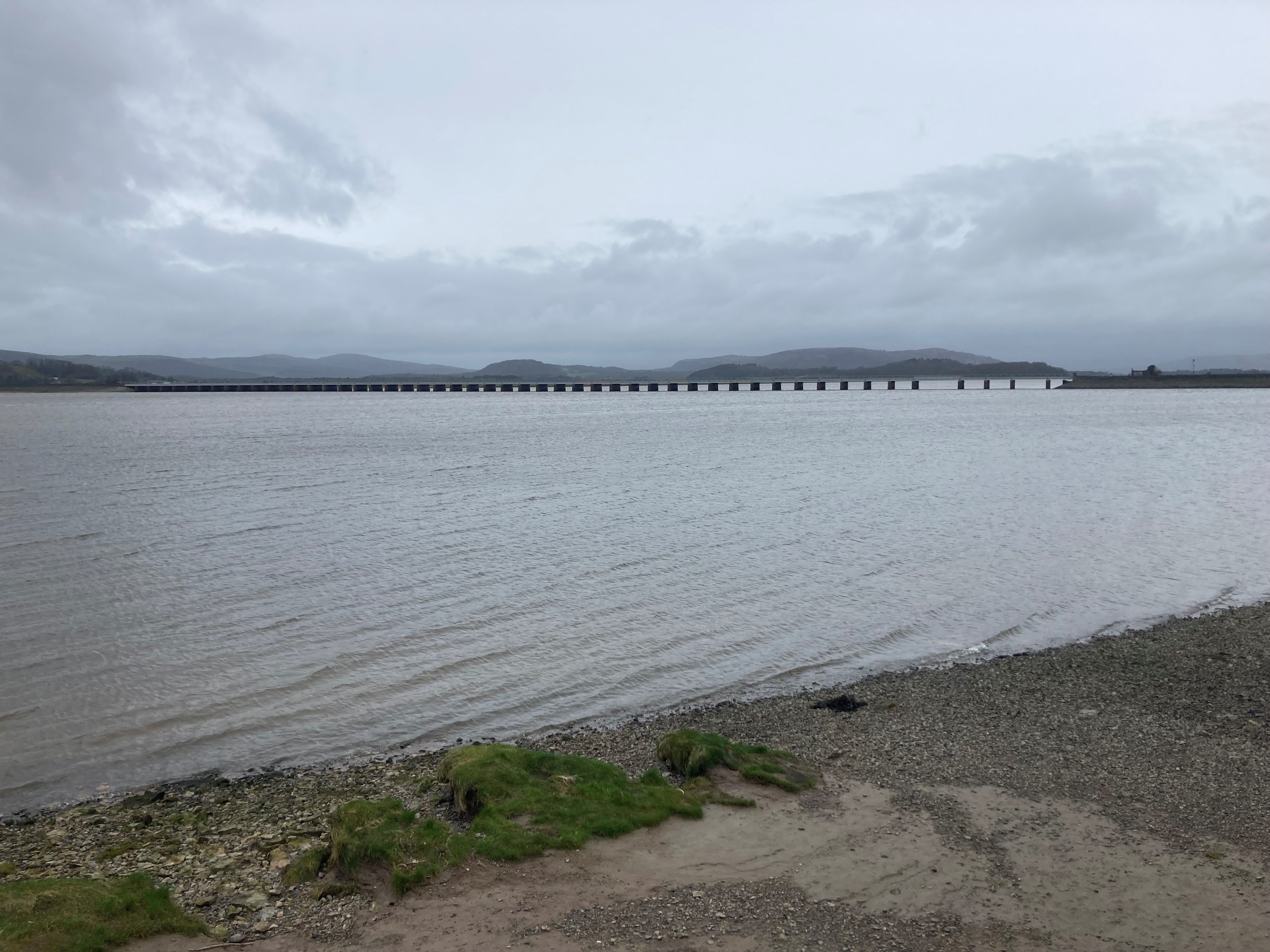
Arnside Viaduct -tide in

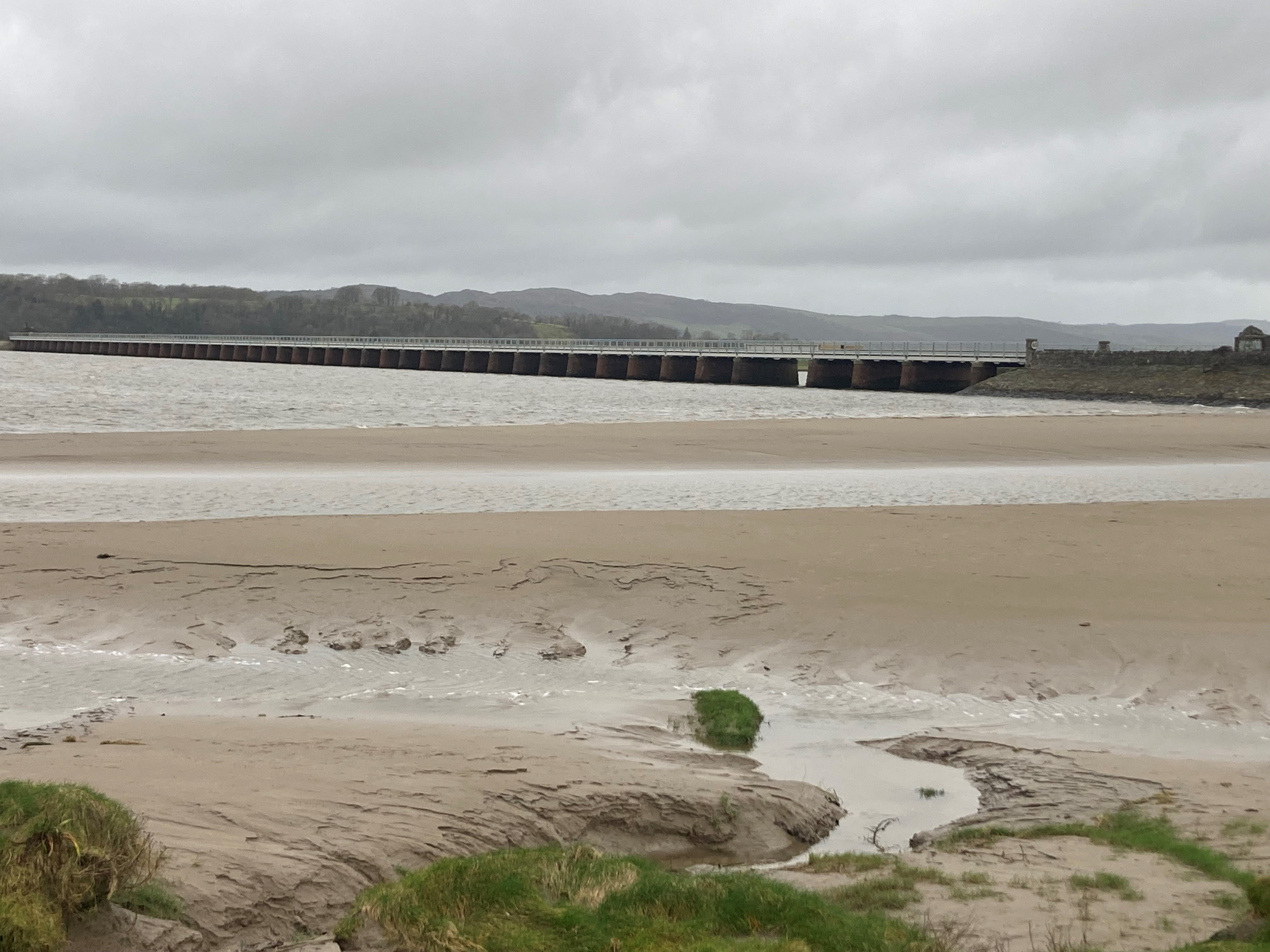
Arnside Viaduct -tide out

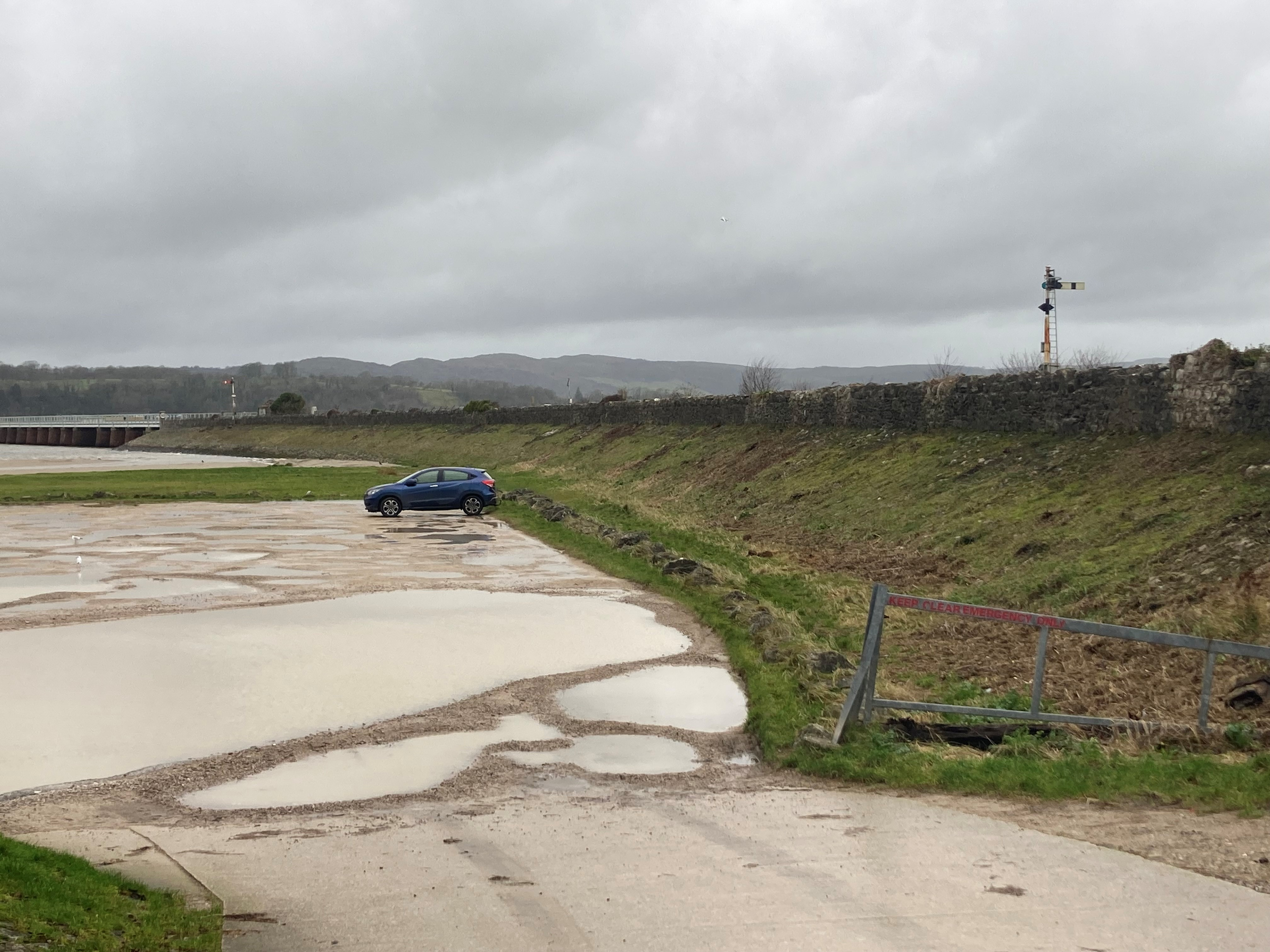
Arnside Viaduct -approaches with signal

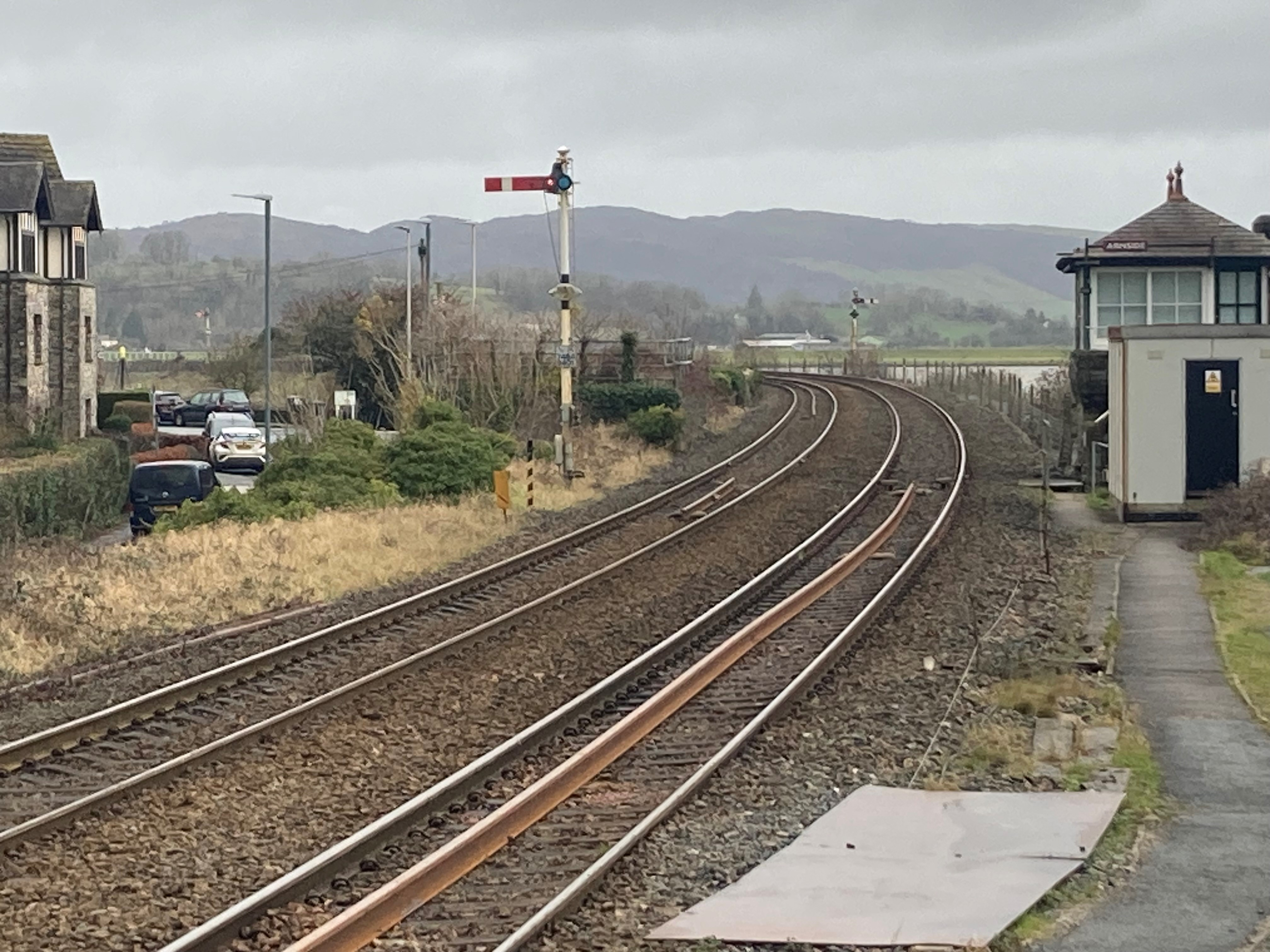
Arnside Viaduct -from station platform with signal and signal box

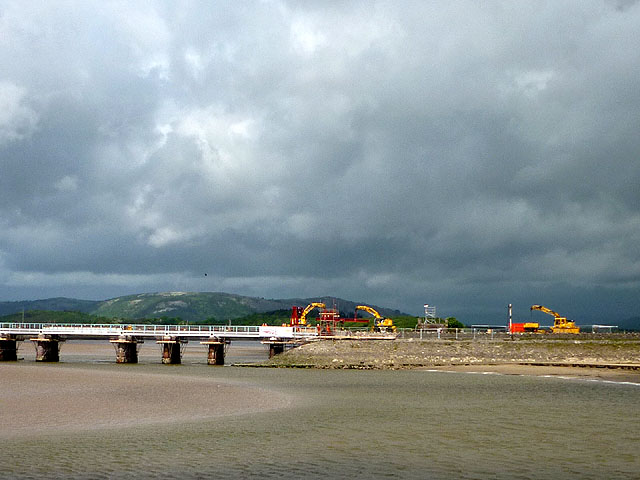
Engineering works on the Viaduct - geograph.org.uk - 2405665

== See also ==
- Leven Viaduct
- Ribblehead Viaduct
- Dent Head Viaduct
