= Integrated Household Survey =

The Integrated Household Survey (IHS) is a survey made up of multiple other surveys in many countries including the UK . It includes about 340,000 respondents, making it the largest collection of social data in the UK after the census. The surveys it is made up of are the Annual Population Survey and the Living Cost and Food Survey.
