= Retail Price Index =

United Kingdom measure of inflation

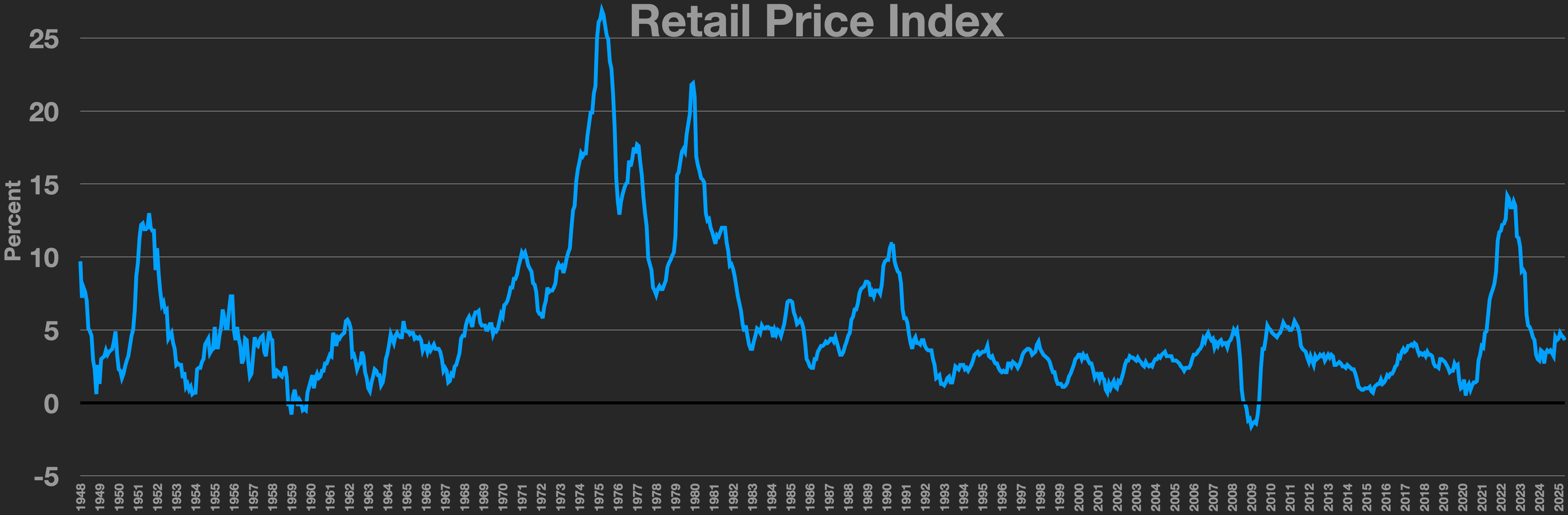
Retail Price Index

In the United Kingdom, the Retail Prices Index or Retail Price Index (RPI) is a measure of inflation published monthly by the Office for National Statistics. It measures the change in the cost of a representative sample of retail goods and services.

As the RPI was held not to meet international statistical standards, since 2013, the Office for National Statistics no longer classifies it as a "national statistic", emphasising the Consumer Price Index instead. However, as of 2018, the UK Treasury still uses the RPI measure of inflation for various index-linked tax rises.

== History ==
RPI was first introduced in 1956, replacing the previous Interim Index of Retail Prices that had been in use since June 1947. It was once the principal official measure of inflation. It has been superseded in that regard by the Consumer Price Index (CPI).

The RPI is still used by the government as a base for various purposes, such as the amounts payable on index-linked securities, including index-linked gilts, and social housing rent increases. Many employers also use it as a starting point in wage negotiation. Since 2003, it is no longer used by the government for the inflation target for the Bank of England's Monetary Policy Committee nor, from April 2011, as the basis for the indexation of pensions of former public sector employees. As of 2016, the UK state pension is indexed by the highest of the increase in average earnings, CPI or 2.5% ("the triple lock").

The highest annual inflation since the introduction of the RPI came in June 1975, with an increase in retail prices of 26.9% from a year earlier. By 1978, this had fallen to less than 10%, but it rose again towards 20% over the following two years before falling again. By 1982, it had fallen below 10% and a year later was down to 4%, remaining low for several years until approaching double figures again by 1990. Aided by a recession in the early 1990s, increased interest rates brought inflation down again to an even lower level.

From March to October 2009, the change in RPI measured over a 12-month period was negative, indicating an overall annual reduction in prices, for the first time since 1960. The change in RPI in the 12 months ending in April 2009, at −1.2%, was the lowest since the index started in 1948.

Housing associations lobbied the government to allow them to freeze rents at current levels rather than reduce them in line with the RPI, but the Treasury concluded that rents should follow RPI down as far as −2% per annum, leading to savings in housing benefit.

In February 2011, annual RPI inflation jumped to 5.1% putting pressure on the Bank of England to raise interest rates despite disappointing projected GDP growth of only 1.6% in 2011. The September 2011 figure of 5.6%, the highest for 20 years, was described by the Daily Telegraph as "shockingly bad".

After a thorough review, in 2012 the National Statistician's Consumer Prices Advisory Committee (CPAC) determined that due to the use of the Carli formula in certain subcomponents, the RPI is biased upwards compared to other indices by a "formula effect" of roughly one percentage point. CPAC concluded that "the use of the Carli formula is no longer appropriate" due to the weak axiomatic properties of the Carli method. (The weak property is the fact that after a price bounce and a subsequent full return to original prices, the Carli method shows positive aggregate inflation.).

In 2013, following a consultation on options for improving the RPI, the National Statistician concluded that the formula used to produce the RPI does not meet international standards and recommended that a new index known as RPIJ be published. Subsequently, ONS decided to no longer classify RPI as a "national statistic". However, ONS will continue to calculate RPI, among several versions of the inflation index, in order to provide a consistent historic inflation time series. The index factors continue to be used to adjust for inflation in the calculation of chargeable (capital) gains for inclusion in the tax computation for entities subject to corporation tax in the UK.

In January 2018, Mark Carney, Governor of the Bank of England, said that RPI should be abandoned.

In November 2021, inflation has risen faster than projected to its highest level in nearly a decade, putting pressure on the Bank of England to increase interest rates. According to data from the ONS, the annual rate of the CPI increased to 4.2 percent in October, up from 3.1 percent in September. Inflation surpassed the Bank of England's target of 2% and was higher than the 3.9 percent predicted by experts. Higher rates for transportation, restaurants, and hotels mainly contributed to the price increase in October.

== Calculation ==
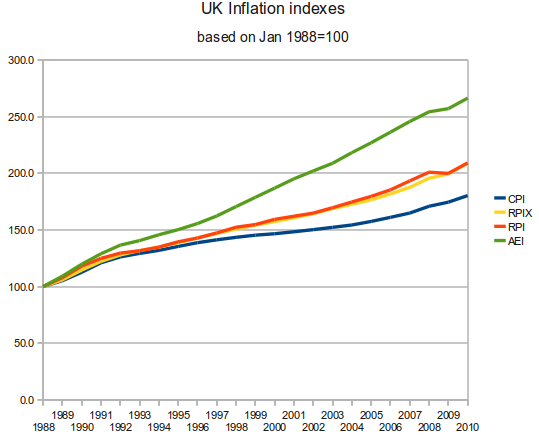
3 inflation indexes compared, based on 1988 as 100: Retail Price Index, RPIX and CPI with the Average Earnings Index also included

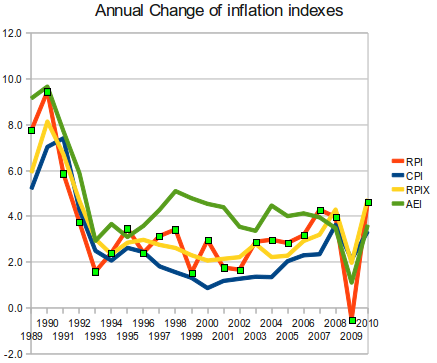
The annual rate of change of the three indexes shows the volatility of the RPI measure, which is one of its disadvantages

The United Kingdom RPI is constructed as follows:

1. A base year or starting point is chosen. This becomes the standard against which price changes are measured.
2. A list of items bought by an average family is drawn up. This is facilitated by the Living Costs and Food Survey.
3. A set of weights are calculated, showing the relative importance of the items in the average family budget – the greater the share of the average household bill, the greater the weight.
4. The price of each item is multiplied by the weight given to the item, so that the contribution of the item's price is in proportion to its importance.
5. The price of each item must be found in both the base year and the year of comparison (or month).

This enables the percentage change to be calculated over the desired time period.

The RPI calculation employs a variation of the Carli method rather than the Jevons method employed in the calculation of RPIJ and CPI.

The unweighted Carli method overstates inflation rates. However, as stated above, the RPI calculation employs weights, which remove this overstatement.

In practice the comparison is made over shorter periods, and the weights are frequently reassessed. Detailed information is published on the Office for National Statistics website.

The RPI includes an element of housing costs, whereas the following items are not included in the CPI: Council tax, mortgage interest payments, house depreciation, buildings insurance, ground rent, solar PV feed in tariffs and other house purchase cost such as estate agents' and conveyancing fees. A further index, CPIH, has been published which includes housing costs but CPIH does not meet current international standards. The Office for National Statistics states that:

The Consumer Prices Index including owner occupiers' housing costs (CPIH) is the most comprehensive measure of inflation. It extends the Consumer Prices Index (CPI) to include a measure of the costs associated with owning, maintaining and living in one's own home, known as owner occupiers'.

CPI is usually lower, though this is due more to the differences in the calculation formulas for the indices than to the differences in coverage. The UK Government announced in the June 2010 budget that CPI would be used in place of RPI for uprating of some benefits with effect from April 2011.

Regarding state pensions, the UK government confirmed in their autumn statement in 2011 that these would go up by the greater of the CPI, average earnings, or 2.5%.

The variability of the change in RPI, due to fluctuations in mortgage interest rates, is shown in the graph on the right. This was one of the arguments used in favour of changing to RPIX.

== Variations ==
Variations on the RPI include the RPIX, which removes the cost of mortgage interest payments, the RPIY, which excludes indirect taxes (VAT) and local authority taxes as well as mortgage interest payments, and the RPIJ which uses the Jevons (geometric) rather than the Carli (arithmetic) method of averaging.

== See also ==
- Consumer price index (general concept)
- Price index (more detailed statistical explanation)
