= Railway nationalisation =

Act of taking rail transport assets into public ownership

Railway nationalisation is the act of taking rail transport assets into public ownership similar to many roadways. Several countries have at different times nationalised part or all of their railway system.

More recently, the international trend has been towards privatisation. In some areas, notably Great Britain, resultant problems with track maintenance have led back to a more mixed solution, with a nationalised infrastructure operator but privately run train operating companies.

National characteristics influenced the structures under which countries' rail networks developed. Some national railways were always under direct State management, some were State-planned but privately operated (as in France), others were wholly private enterprises lightly regulated (as in Great Britain, Ireland and Spain). Nationalisation was therefore a bolder step to take in some countries than in others. While ideology has played a role, so too has the need for systematic reconstruction of vital infrastructure devastated by war, often following a period of state control over private companies initiated during the conflict.

== Americas ==
=== Argentina ===
The Argentine railways developed with private British, Argentine and French capital and were nationalised by the state in 1948 during President Juan Perón's first term of office and merged into the existing state-owned railways. In the 1990s, following Carlos Menem's neoliberal reforms, services were privatised through concession, with infrastructure still belonging to the state. After a series of high-profile accidents and serious deterioration of services under privatisation, most rail lines have returned to state control by 2015, in effect re-nationalising them.

=== Canada ===
In Canada, the government took control of several railways that fell into bankruptcy following World War I, including the Canadian Northern Railway, the Grand Trunk Pacific Railway, and the Grand Trunk Railway. On 20 December 1918, the federal government created the Canadian National Railways (CNR), and placed the companies under this new entity. CNR was privatised in 1995.

=== United States ===
After the United States entered World War I in 1917, the country's railways proved inadequate to the task of supplying the nation's war effort. On 26 December 1917, U.S. President Woodrow Wilson nationalised most American railways under the Federal Possession and Control Act, creating the United States Railroad Administration (USRA).

It took control of the railways on 28 December 1917, and introduced several reforms to increase efficiency and reduce costs. It standardised rolling stock and steam locomotive designs. The war ended in 1918.

In March 1920, control of the railways was returned to their original owners. Freight operations and most of the track have remained private enterprises, even as changing markets forced railroad companies to restructure in the post-World War II years. On 27 December 1943, President Roosevelt nationalised the railroads for a few weeks to settle a strike.

Due to changes in transportation after the construction of the interstate highway system in the postwar years and a shift to trucking, railroads in the late 20th century went through widespread restructuring and reduction. Passenger traffic particularly had declined as more families owned and used private automobiles or took flights for long distance trips. Under President Richard Nixon, Amtrak was established to try to continue passenger operations by using existing tracks. It has been subsidised in order to continue service to some areas that had no alternative transportation, as well as to relieve congested roadways in more dense areas, as on the Northeast corridor. Amtrak subsequently bought some tracks from bankrupt railways as well as Conrail.

== Asia ==
=== India ===
Indian Railways has been state owned since 1951. However, in 2020, the Modi government announced plans to privatise some routes. But as per the articles published in various media reports Railway Minister Sh. Piyush Goyal assured that Railway will never be privatised however private investment will be encouraged for efficient functioning of National Transporter.

=== Japan ===
In Japan, the Railway Nationalization Act of 1906 brought most of the country's private railway lines under public control. Between 1906 and 1907, 2,812 miles (4,525 km) of track were purchased from seventeen private railway companies. The national railway network grew to about 4,400 miles (7,100 km) of track, and private railways were relegated to providing local and regional services. In the 1980s the process of privatising Japanese National Railways begun that is not entirely finished as of 2016 with both entirely state and private members of the JR Group.

=== Russia ===
Railroads in the Russian Empire were built by both the state and capitalists. After communist takeover the whole railway system was brought under the state control and remained so after fall of the communist rule. Nowadays the Russian Railways state-owned company holds monopoly on this sphere of transportation.

== Europe ==
=== France ===
In 1878, the French government took over ten small failing railway companies and established the Chemins de fer de l'État. The company absorbed the Chemins de Fer de l'Ouest in 1908. In 1938, the French state took 51% ownership of the newly formed SNCF merging of France's five main railways (100% in 1982).

=== Germany ===
The earliest railways in the German states were often run by private entrepreneurs. Beginning in 1879, the Prussian government nationalised the major railways. After World War I, the German Reich took over control of the state railways of Prussia, Bavaria, Saxony, Württemberg, Baden, Mecklenburg-Schwerin, Hesse and Oldenburg. The individual railways were merged into the Deutsche Reichsbahn-Gesellschaft in February 1924. The DRG was the largest publicly owned company in the world when the Nazis privatised it in 1937. In the lead up to, and during, World War II the DR assimilated a great number of railway companies in the German-occupied territories as well as several smaller, previously privately owned lines in Germany.

Post-World War II, after being under Allied administration between 1945 and 1949, the DR was split up into the Deutsche Bundesbahn and Deutsche Reichsbahn (East Germany), both state-owned. Private railways continued to exist in the West German realm of the DB, but DB and DR accounted for most of the rail traffic in post-war Germany. After German reunification, DB and DR became Deutsche Bahn in 1994.

Whilst DB AG is a public limited company, all its shares are presently owned by the government of the Federal Republic of Germany. DB AG is now facing stiff competition in the freight and short-distance passenger sector (the latter of which is subject to franchising), although they still hold a quasi-monopoly in the long-distance passenger sector (which does not receive subsidies), which was starting to crack until the opening of the long-distance bus market destroyed the business case of any open access competition. The IPO, originally planned for 2008, has been postponed indefinitely and is currently not on the agenda of any major political party.

=== Ireland ===
In Ireland CIÉ was formed from the merger of the Great Southern Railways with the Dublin United Transport Company on 1 January 1945. Initially a private company limited by shares, CIÉ was nationalised in 1950. The final privately owned mainline railway company on the island, the Great Northern Railway, was nationalised under joint control of the Irish and Northern Irish governments in 1953. It was wound up in 1958 and its assets split between CIÉ and the UTA.

=== Italy ===
Following unification, the Italian Government entrusted the railways to five regional concessionaires. The arrangement did not work well and, long before it was due to expire, the railways were nationalised in 1905. The nationalised operator is known as Ferrovie dello Stato. Italy has an open access high-speed rail operator competing against the national railway; Italo Nuovo Trasporto Viaggiatori which is part owned by SNCF and private investors.

=== Spain ===
After years of declining profitability, the national rail network was devastated by the Spanish Civil War. In 1941, the broad gauge railways were nationalised, as RENFE (Red Nacional de los Ferrocarriles Españoles). The narrow gauge railways were also later nationalised; some of these have since been transferred to the autonomous regional governments where contained within a single region. The standard gauge high-speed lines were built as a state owned venture from the start.

=== United Kingdom ===
Rail passengers in Great Britain from 1829 to 2025

In 1914, the railways were taken into temporary government control - but not ownership - due to World War I, but were returned to the original owners in 1921, three years after the war had ended. However, in that same year, the government introduced the Railways Act 1921. This forced the 120 railway companies then operating to merge into just four. This grouping officially took place on 1 January 1923. The four railway companies formed from the grouping were: The Great Western Railway, the Southern Railway, the London & North Eastern Railway, and the London, Midland & Scottish Railway. After World War II, the railways were effectively nationalised. They were heavily damaged by enemy attacks and were run down aiding the war effort, as well as still suffering financially from the Great Depression even with it mostly ending before the war. After the war, the Transport Act 1947 provided for nationalising the four major railways. On 1 January 1948, the railways were formally nationalised and British Railways was created, under the overall management of the British Transport Commission, later the British Railways Board.

Railways in Northern Ireland were nationalised in the 1940s under the Ulster Transport Authority (UTA). The former LMS lines managed by the Northern Counties Committee, nationalised by the Westminster government, were sold to the UTA by the British Transport Commission in 1949.

==== Privatisation in UK ====
British Rail was privatised between 1994 and 1997, involving the transfer to a series of private-sector operators of responsibility for the provision of services under contract. In all, more than 100 companies took over from British Rail. In 2001 the track operator Railtrack went bankrupt; it was reconstituted and renamed as Network Rail, a private company with no legal owner but effectively government-controlled via its constitution and financing. The United Kingdom government continues to invest in the railways, financing, for example, the acquisition of some InterCity rolling stock.

The positive impact of privatisation is disputed, with passengers numbers more than doubling (see graph) and increasing customer satisfaction balanced with worries about the level of rail subsidies and criticism of the fact that much of the system is now contracted out to subsidiaries owned by the state owned railways of France, Germany and the Netherlands.

Only 20% of Southern trains arrived on time in the year from April 2015 to March 2016, and there was an ongoing industrial dispute over driver-only operated trains. In June 2016, amongst criticism of the performance of its services, Go-Ahead Group warned of lower than anticipated profits on its Govia Thameslink Railway franchises, leading to 18% drop in the Go-Ahead share price.

Unlike British Rail, the Northern Ireland Railways remain state owned.

The franchisee system for passenger rail effectively ended in March 2020, when the Department for Transport switched every passenger line to an "Emergency Measures Agreement", whereby the franchisees would still operate the line, but the government would take all cost-risk and all revenue. This was initially supposed to be a temporary measure to keep trains running during the pandemic, but in September 2020, the Minister for Transport, Grant Shapps published a press release entitled "Rail franchising reaches its terminus as a new railway takes shape". The government acknowledged in this release that rail privatisation "was no longer working", and that a transition away from privately run passenger rail would begin with "Emergency Recovery Measures Agreements" with rail franchisees, which have much stricter guidelines that operators must adhere to.

==== Re-nationalisation ====
In July 2024, the new Starmer government confirmed that they would continue the previous Conservative government's plans to set up Great British Railways to oversee rail transport in Great Britain. The government also confirmed that train operating companies would gradually be brought back into public ownership upon the expiration of their contracts and then folded into the new publicly owned body.

On 25 May 2025, Labour's renationalisation of the UK's railways began as the train operator South Western Railway was taken into public ownership.

Passenger train operators continue to be renationalised, with services to be managed at some future time by Great British Railways, with c2c taken back into public ownership on 20 July 2025.

== See also ==
- Rail subsidies
- Transit privatisation
