= Schmickler =

Schmickler is a surname. Notable people with the surname include:

- Marcus Schmickler (born 1968), German composer
- Wilfried Schmickler (born 1954), German comedian

== See also ==
- Schickler
