= Ellie Harrison (artist) =

British artist (born 1979)

- Ellie Harrison, Daily Data Logger (2005)
- Born: 1979 (age 46–47); London, England
- Education: Nottingham Trent University; Goldsmiths College; Glasgow School of Art
- Website: www.ellieharrison.com

Ellie Harrison (born 1979) is a British artist known for her use of large quantities of data, collected through labour-intensive games, trials, systems and experiments, and, more recently, for her activist work campaigning for the re-nationalisation of Britain's railways and founder of Campaign to Bring Back British Rail. She is based in Glasgow, Scotland and in April 2013 was appointed Lecturer in Contemporary Art Practices at Duncan of Jordanstone College of Art and Design.

== Early life and education ==
Brought up in Ealing in west London, Harrison attended Drayton Manor High School until the age of 18. After completing a Foundation Diploma in Art & Design at West Thames College in Hounslow, she went on to study Fine Art at Nottingham Trent University from 1998 – 2001 and at Goldsmiths College from 2002 – 2003. She moved to Scotland in 2008 to undertake a Leverhulme Scholarship on the Master of Fine Art course at Glasgow School of Art, where her degree show Press Release, exhibited at the CCA Glasgow in 2010, consisted of news coverage about her work.

== Career ==
Harrison first became known for her 2002 work Eat 22, for which she photographed and recorded information about everything she ate for a year. She published the images online on a weekly basis throughout that year as an early example of photo blogging. The project received international attention, featuring in the press in India, Taiwan, Czech Republic, France, Sweden, the US and across the UK. In 2003, the high-speed animated film of all 1,640 of the Eat 22 photos was included in the exhibition Treat Yourself at the Science Museum, London and in 2007 was put on permanent display at the Wellcome Collection, London.

Harrison then went on to complete a series of large-scale "data collecting" projects including Gold Card Adventures (September 2002 – September 2003). She undertook this next project the year before the automated Oystercard system was introduced on London Transport, by manually recording the total distance of all the journeys she made on London Underground and on local buses for a period of one year, which amounted to more than 9,210 km. The resulting exhibition Gold Card Adventures (named after the yearly Travelcard that she used), took place at Piccadilly Circus tube station in 2005 as part of the Art on the Underground scheme.

In 2005 to 2006, Harrison curated Day-to-Day Data, a group exhibition of "artists who collect list, database and absurdly analyse the data of everyday life". The exhibition toured the UK, visiting Danielle Arnaud contemporary art, London, Aspex Gallery, Portsmouth and Angel Row Gallery, Nottingham. It was accompanied by a publication, a web-based exhibition and a symposium that took place at the Institute of Contemporary Arts, London on 18 March 2006.

Harrison's early "data collecting" projects were examples of what is now referred to as life-logging or the quantified self. At the height of this work in 2005, she created the Daily Data Logger character described as "an enthusiastic, data-collecting obsessive so keen on measuring / quantifying the things that surround her that she permanently dresses in a tracksuit (for easy manoeuvrability) and wears a utility belt jam-packed with data collecting devices".

Her final major "data collecting" project was the three-year Tea Blog (1 January 2006 – 31 December 2008), for which she published online what she was thinking about every time she had a hot drink. As a very early example of microblogging, the popularity of Harrison's Tea Blog, prefigured that of the Twitter platform, which did not launch until mid 2006.

In 2006, Harrison ceremoniously rejected her "data collecting" methodologies and entered into a period of self-reflection and re-invention in order to develop a "healthier and more outward looking practice". The 2009 book about her work entitled Confessions of a Recovering Data Collector, explores the negative impact such practices can have on individuals and wider society and includes her own "confession" that: "Web2.0 has spawned a whole new generation of data collectors. There is now such a ridiculous abundance of boring information about other people's lives on the internet, I felt obliged to stop adding to it". Harrison has since engaged in other activities that aim to draw attention to what she calls "the negative side effects of instantaneous ego-broadcasting" including launching her own ongoing "active Twitter boycott" in July 2008.

=== Later work ===
Although she still retains a core interest in data visualisation, Harrison's recent work is more overtly political. She has used a mixture of sculpture, installation and live performance to respond to the British culture she grew up in and its dominant political and economic systems. Her all-night live performance General Election Drinking Game coincided with the 2010 United Kingdom general election in order to offer an alternative commentary on the results. In 2011 her installation A Brief History of Privatisation, which used a circle of electric massage chairs to re-enact the history of UK public service policy over the last century, was exhibited at Watermans Arts Centre, Edinburgh Art Festival and Vane, Newcastle. She collaborated with British comedian Josie Long to create an alternative live "tour" of the exhibition.

Harrison often uses deliberately playful and accessible techniques to animate what could otherwise be seen as dull or obscure economic information. Her 2009 installation The History of Financial Crises, (first exhibited at Mejan Labs, Stockholm for Harrison's two-person show Transfers & Actions with Casey Reas), used a row of popcorn making machines to re-enact the history of capitalism over the last century. Harrison's Vending Machine (2009) has been exhibited at venues across the UK and Ireland and features an old vending machine reprogrammed (using an Arduino board controlled by a Pure Data patch) to release free crisps when search terms relating to the recession make the headlines on the BBC News RSS feed. It now features in the permanent public art collection at the Open Data Institute, London.

In 2012, Harrison researched the history of UK public spending on the arts for The Redistribution of Wealth, an interactive installation shown at Tate Britain, London as part of the Late at Tate series. In 2014, she responded to the Referendum on Scottish Independence in the piece After the Revolution, Who Will Clean Up the Mess? at Talbot Rice Gallery, Edinburgh. The installation featured a row of confetti cannons connected to a central detonation button, which would only be activated on the event of a "Yes" vote.

In January 2016, it was announced that Harrison had been given a grant of £15,000 by Creative Scotland for her project on the Glasgow effect, causing controversy on social media.

=== Activism ===
Harrison's growing interest in politics has increasingly moved her to direct political action, to the extent that her practice is now often described as "shifting between the roles of artist, activist and administrator".

Harrison began campaigning for the protection of public services in 2008 as one of the leaders of a successful campaign to "Save Victoria Baths" in Nottingham from closure, which resulted in Nottingham City Council committing £7 million to rebuild a new leisure centre on its existing site.

In 2009, whilst studying at Glasgow School of Art, she began public transport campaigning by launching the Bring Back British Rail campaign. Motivated by her concerns about climate change and the need to encourage the use of less carbon-intensive transportation, she aimed to popularise the idea of returning Britain's rail network to public ownership, following its privatisation in 1994, when Harrison was 15 years old. Harrison has appeared on the Today programme, Sky News, RT News and Russia Today, and on other national and local BBC Radio programmes as the campaign's spokesperson. In 2013 she was invited by Caroline Lucas MP to sit on "The Future of Our Railways" panel at the annual conference of the Green Party of England and Wales in Brighton. On 26 April 2015, less than six years after its launch, the Bring Back British Rail campaign reached a milestone of 100,000 supporters on its Facebook page. Later that year, after Jeremy Corbyn was elected leader of the Labour Party, rail re-nationalisation became the Official Opposition policy.

In 2013, Harrison led the "Say NO to Tesco in Scotland" campaign, which began as a protest against the proliferation of small supermarkets in the West end of Glasgow. The campaign group presented a petition to "stop supermarket expansion on local high streets" to the Public Petitions Committee at the Scottish Parliament in January 2014. In September 2014, after hearing the petition on three further occasions, the Committee referred it to the Local Government & Regeneration Committee to be considered in the context the Community Empowerment (Scotland) Bill. In January 2015, due to falling sales and profit warnings in 2014, Tesco announced it was axing plans for eight new stores in Scotland and closing 43 of its smaller stores across the UK.

=== National Museum of Roller Derby ===
As an exploration of bureaucratic processes, over the last few years Harrison has been involved in the setting-up and running of a number of experimental and fully functional organisations and institutions, including the National Museum of Roller Derby (NMRD), which she founded at Glasgow Women's Library in 2012.

Harrison first became involved in the sport of Women's Flat Track Roller Derby at the start of 2012, when she began training with Glasgow Roller Derby under the skater name CH£AP SKATE 79. This coincided with her time as artist in residence at Glasgow Women's Library as part of the 21 Revolutions project, celebrating the twentieth anniversary of the library. On 14 June 2012 the NMRD was launched, by establishing the library the official home of the UK's first permanent archive of materials and ephemeral relating to this all-female, full-contact sport.

=== Awards and honours ===
In 2011, Harrison was shortlisted for the Converse/Dazed Emerging Artists Award with the Whitechapel Gallery, London alongside Gabriele Beveridge, Bruce Ingram, Samuel Levack & Jennifer Lewandowski and Richard Parry. Later that year she was featured in The Hot 100 – The List (magazine)'s "definitive list of Scottish creative talent" and on The Independent on Sunday's Pink List as "one to watch". In 2012, she was invited to be a member of the International Jury of the 6th Iris Prize and to co-host, with Peter Tatchell, the awards ceremony for the inaugural Lush Prize in support of alternatives to animal testing. In 2014, Harrison was shortlisted for the Best Artistic Response Award at the Climate Week Awards for her ongoing project Early Warning Signs.

=== Notable work ===
Below is a list of all Harrison's notable works

- 2002 Eat 22
- 2003 Gold Card Adventures
- 2005 Day-to-Day Data
- 2005 Daily Data Logger
- 2006 Tea Blog
- 2009 Confessions of a Recovering Data Collector
- 2009 Vending Machine
- 2009 The History of Financial Crises
- 2010 General Election Drinking Game
- 2010 Press Release
- 2011 A Brief History of Privatisation
- 2011 Early Warning Signs{
- 2012 The Redistribution of Wealth
- 2012 National Museum of Roller Derby
- 2014 After the Revolution, Who Will Clean Up the Mess?
- 2016 The Glasgow effect
