= Impact of the privatisation of British Rail =

Rail passengers in Great Britain from 1829 to 2025

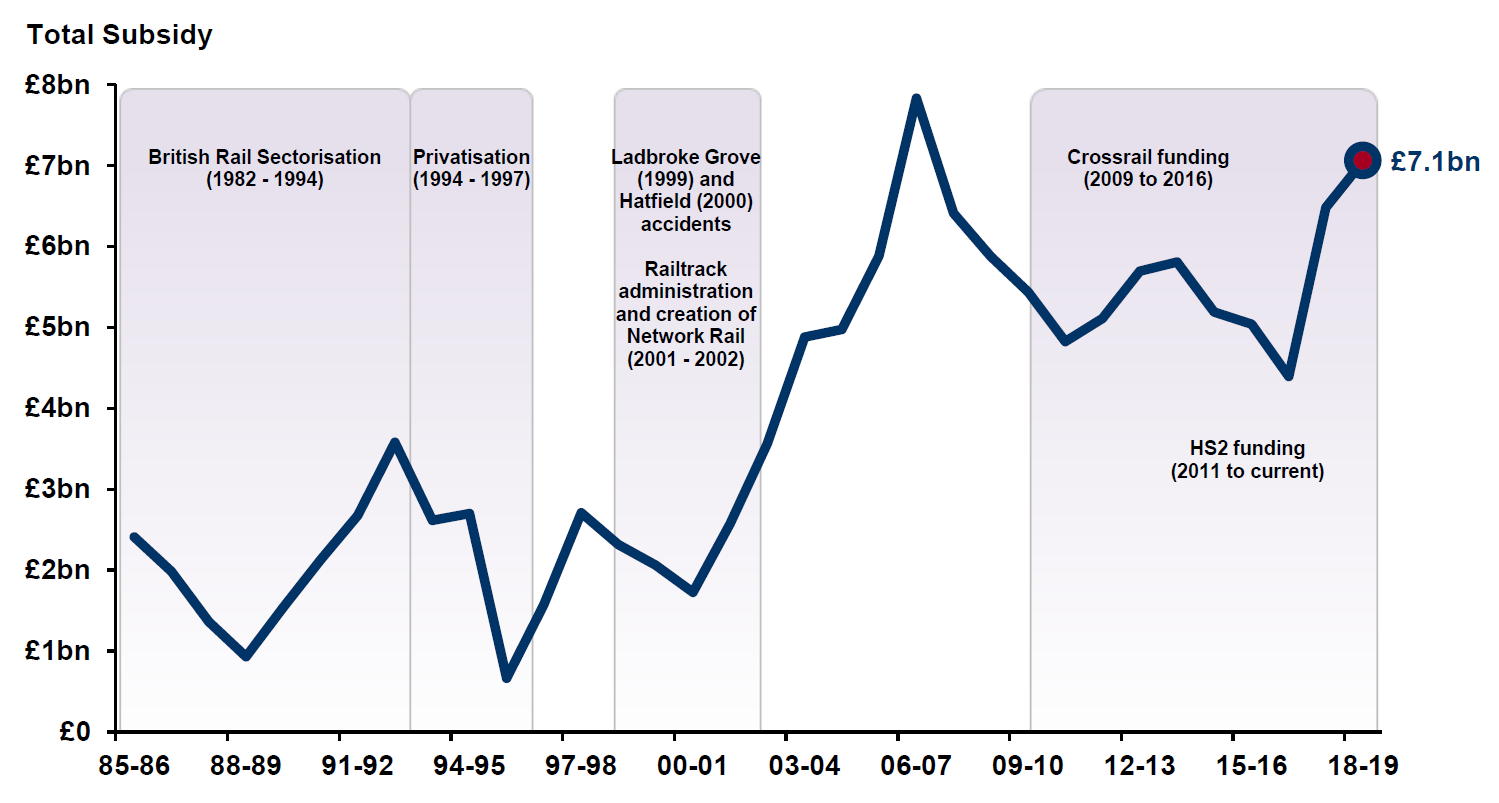
GB total rail subsidy 1985–2019 in 2018 prices, showing a short decline in subsidy after privatisation, followed by a steep rise following the Hatfield crash in 2000 then a further increase to fund Crossrail and HS2 development

The impact of the privatisation of British Rail has been the subject of much debate, with the stated benefits including improved customer service, and more investment; and stated drawbacks including higher fares, lower punctuality and increased rail subsidies. The privatisation of British Rail began in the 1990s.

== Development of British Rail since privatisation ==
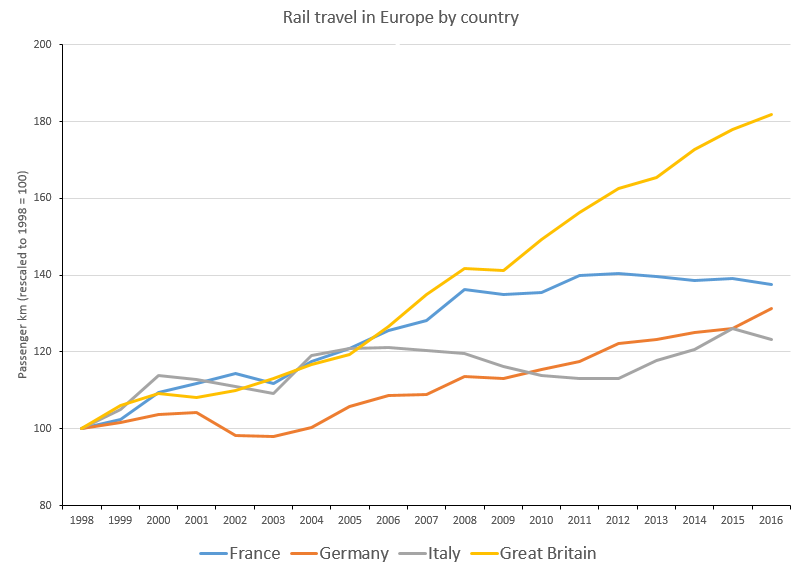
Passenger-km of rail transport in large European countries, rescaled to 1998

=== Customer service ===
According to the National Rail Passenger survey, passenger satisfaction increased from 76% in 1999 (when the survey started) to 83% in 2013 and the number of passengers not satisfied with their journey dropped from 10% to 6%. However, the impact of the Hatfield rail accident in 2000 left services seriously affected for many months after. According to a 2013 Eurobarometer poll, satisfaction with rail of UK respondents was the second-highest in the EU, behind Finland. The poll found that average UK satisfaction over four different areas was 78%, ahead of France (74%), Germany (51%) and Italy (39%).

=== Level of traffic ===
Rail share of passenger transport (1952–2023)

Since privatisation, the number of national rail journeys had increased by 128% in 2019–2020, and the number of passenger-km had increased by 126%, after a period of mostly decline during nationalisation. There is controversy as to how much of this is due to privatisation, and how much is due to other factors such as rising fuel prices, road congestion, low unemployment, and in particular, GDP growth. Critics of privatisation such as the RMT union have pointed out that passenger numbers started rising 18 months before the privatisation process began, as the economy started recovering from the recession of the early 1990s. However this growth has only ever really stopped during the COVID-19 pandemic, with passenger numbers growing faster than comparable European countries such as France or Germany (60% compared to 25% and 23% respectively from 1998 to 2015).

=== Fares and timetable ===
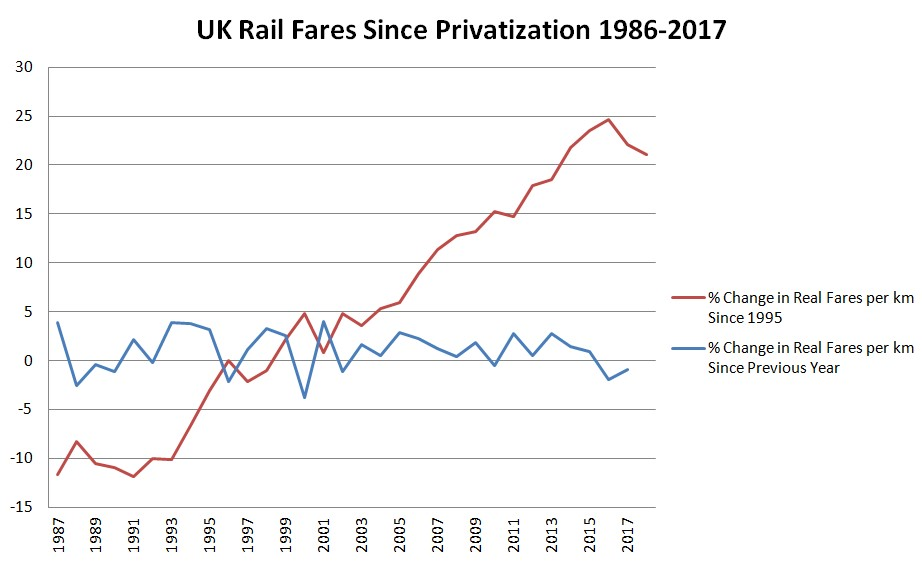
Percent difference from rail fare costs per passenger-km in 1995 privatization

In an attempt to protect passengers' interests, certain fares (mostly commuter season fares) and basic elements of the timetable were regulated. However, the train operating companies (TOCs) still had quite a bit of latitude in changing unregulated fares and could change the number of trains run within certain regulatory and practical limitations. Overall, fare increases have been at a significantly slower rate than under British Rail (BR). According to the Global Railway Review, the average annual real-terms increase between 1996 and 2011 was 1.3%, compared to 2.2% during the last 15 years of British Rail. So far as the timetable is concerned, many more trains are being run each day than under BR as operators have tried to run more frequent but usually shorter trains on many routes to attract more customers.

The increase in fares has not been uniform since privatisation 20 years ago: standard single fares have increased by up to 208%, whereas season ticket price rises hover just below or slightly above the rate of inflation, with an increase of between 55% and 80%, whilst the price of advance tickets has decreased in real terms: the average Advance ticket in 1995 cost £9.14 (in 2014 prices) compared with £5.17 in 2014. This is to try and reduce the significant increase in the number of people travelling at peak times. For example, over half of National Rail journeys into London occur in the three hours from 7am to 10am, with half of these journeys (a quarter of the day's total) occurring between 8am and 9am. In January 2018 fares across all operators were 20% higher in real terms than they were in January 1995. Both the number of journeys per person and travel time has increased, whilst the average journey distance has decreased.

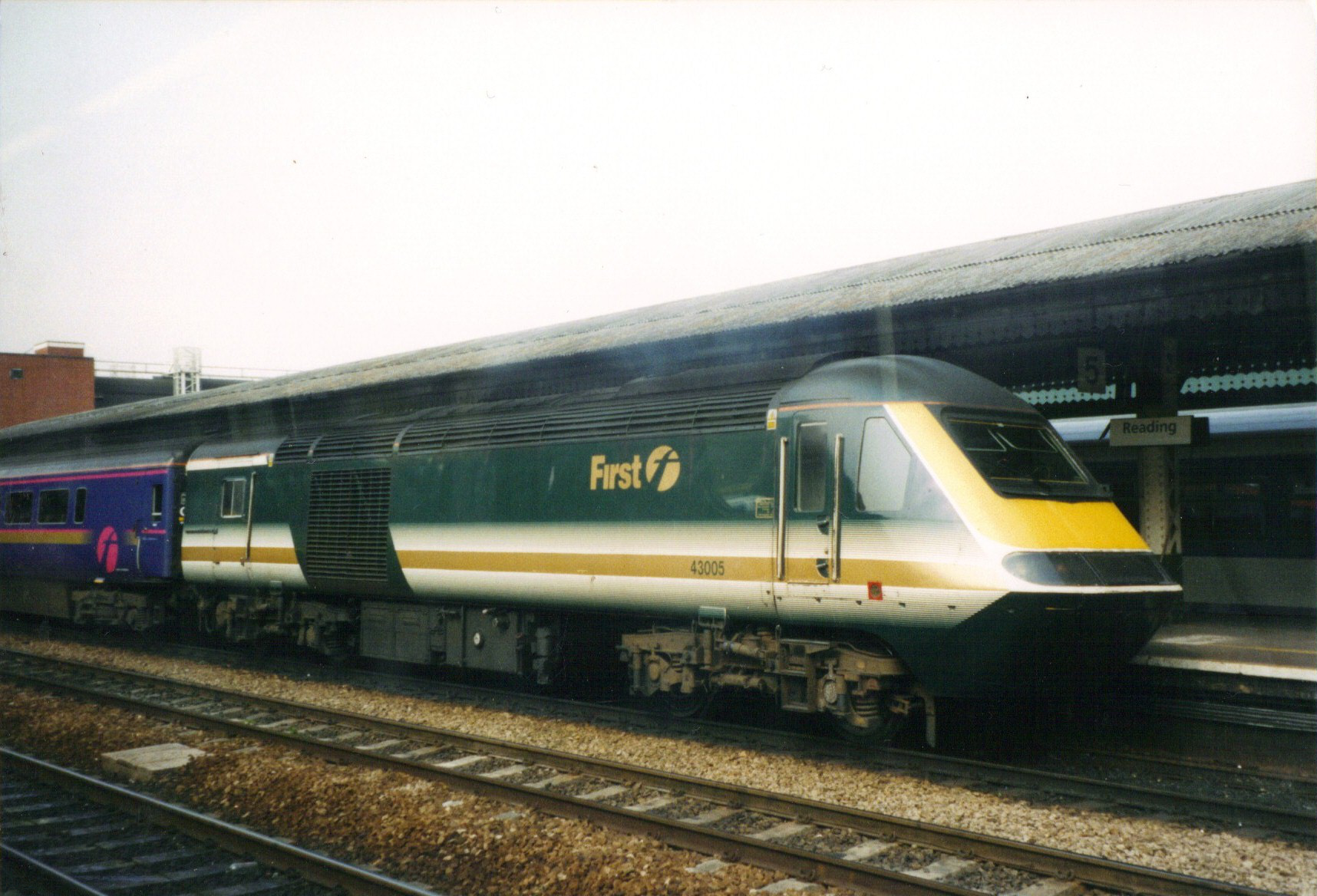
Livery transition: a First Great Western HST power car in older, green livery; the Mk 3 coach behind in newer style mauve

=== New trains ===
The promoters of privatisation expected that the rolling stock companies (ROSCOs) would compete against each other to provide the TOCs with the rolling stock they required. In practice, in most cases the individual TOCs required specific classes of trains to run their services, and often only one of the ROSCOs would have that class of train, resulting in them having to pay whatever the ROSCO concerned cared to charge for leasing the trains. Old rolling stock was extremely profitable to the ROSCOs, as they were able to charge substantial amounts for their hire even though British Rail had already written off their construction costs. As trains grow older, the cost of their lease does not decrease. This was due to the adoption of 'indifference pricing' as the method of determining lease costs by the government, which was intended to make purchasing new trains more attractive when compared to running life-expired trains. The average age of trains in the UK had decreased from that under the last years of BR, as average rolling-stock age fell slightly from the third quarter of 2001–02 to 2017–18, from 20.7 years old to 19.6 years old, whilst orders for new stock will bring down the average age to 15 years by March 2021.

=== Rolling stock manufacturing ===
The rolling stock manufacturers themselves suffered under privatisation; with the hiatus in new orders for new trains caused by the reorganisation and restructuring process, the former York Carriage Works (acquired by ABB) had been severely downsized and eventually closed. It was reopened by Thrall Car Manufacturing Company in 1997, to manufacture 2,500 wagons for EWS, closing again in 2003.

The former Metro-Cammell plant in Washwood Heath (later owned by Alstom) followed suit in 2004, closing its doors once the last of the Class 390 rolled off the assembly line. Of the original manufacturers, only the former Railway Technical Centre and associated British Rail Engineering Limited works in Derby and Crewe survive to the present day; now owned by Bombardier. Hitachi opened a new factory in Newton Aycliffe in 2015. CAF opened a new plant in Newport in 2018 whilst Siemens are to open a new factory in Goole.

=== Punctuality and reliability ===
The key index used to assess passenger train performance is the Public Performance Measure, which represents the percentage of short-distance trains arriving within 5 minutes, and mid-to-long-distance trains within 10 minutes of schedule. From a base of almost 90% of trains arriving on time in 1995, the measure peaked at more than 92% in 1996, before dipping to around 78% in 2002, mostly due to stringent safety restrictions put in place after the Hatfield crash in 2000. However, in 2018–2019 the PPM stood at about 86%, after the annual moving average increased to almost 92% in 2012.

Rail punctuality
Year	Percentage on time
1984/5	~ 90
1986/7	~ 90
1987/8	~ 90
1988/9	~ 89
1995/6	89.5
1996/7	92.5
1997/8	92.5
1998/9	91.5
1999/2000	91.9

=== Safety ===
Rail fatalities per billion passenger-km in European countries in 2013

The railways can point to continued improvements in safety under privatisation; in fact the rate of improvement increased compared to that experienced in the last years of BR, according to research by Imperial College London. The researcher said their findings showed that 150 people had probably lived who might have been expected to die in crashes had pre-privatisation trends continued.

In 2013, according to a European Railway Agency's report, Britain has the safest railways in Europe based on the number of train safety incidents. Several major rail crashes occurred in the early years of privatisation including the Southall rail crash (1997), Ladbroke Grove rail crash (1999), Hatfield rail crash (2000) and the Potters Bar rail crash (2002).

- List of rail accidents in the United Kingdom

=== Investment ===
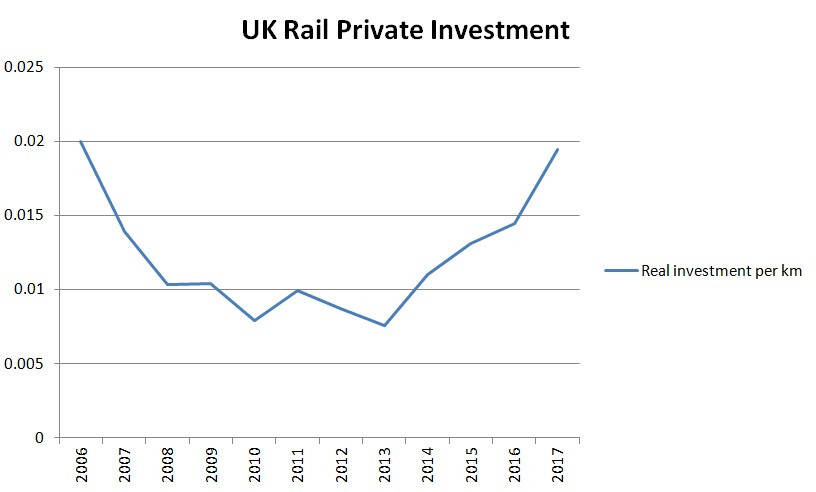
Real private rail investment between 2006/07 and 2017/18 per passenger-km traveled with rail

Since privatisation, the amount of investment has gone up nine-fold, from £698m in 1994–95 to £6.84bn in 2013–14. There has also Government investment across the network in speed improvements, electrification, in-cab signalling on the East Coast Main Line and High Speed 2. Due to the Hatfield accident in 2000, Railtrack undertook large-scale track relaying without sufficient planning, and much of the work was substandard and subsequently had to be re-done. Railtrack's poor project management abilities were exemplified with the West Coast Route Modernisation project, which was intended to deliver a 140 mph route in 2005 at a cost of £2 bn, but which finally delivered a 125 mph route in December 2008 at a cost of £9 bn, which was a major factor in the company's financial collapse.

=== Subsidies ===
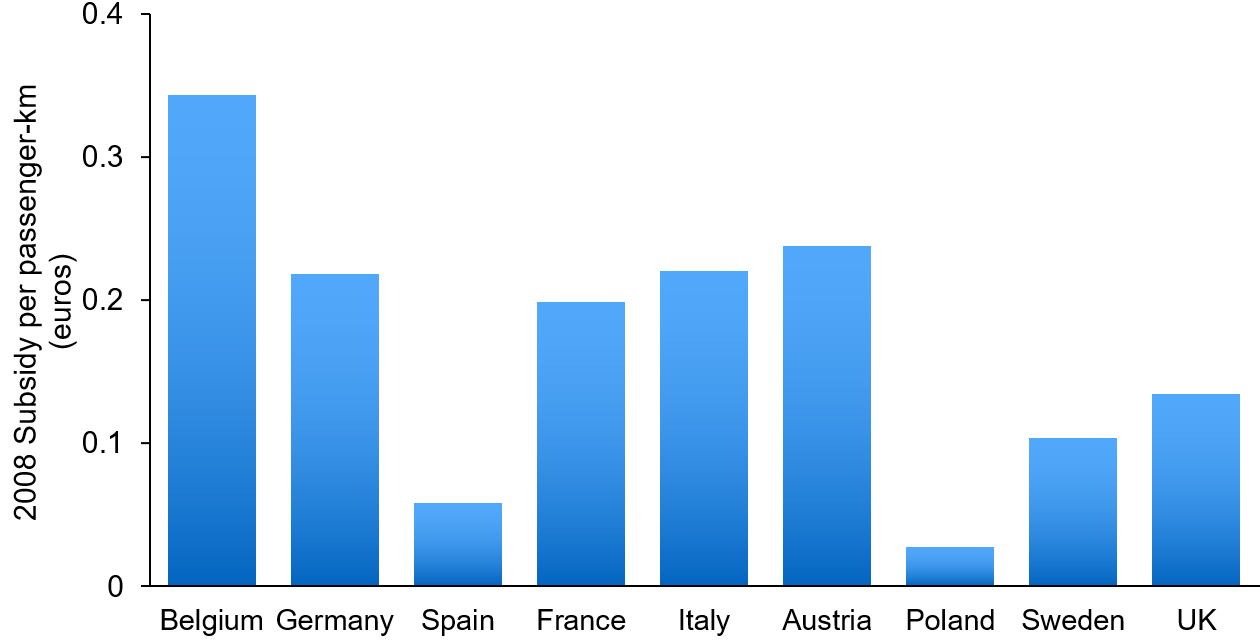
European rail subsidies in euros per passenger-km for 2008

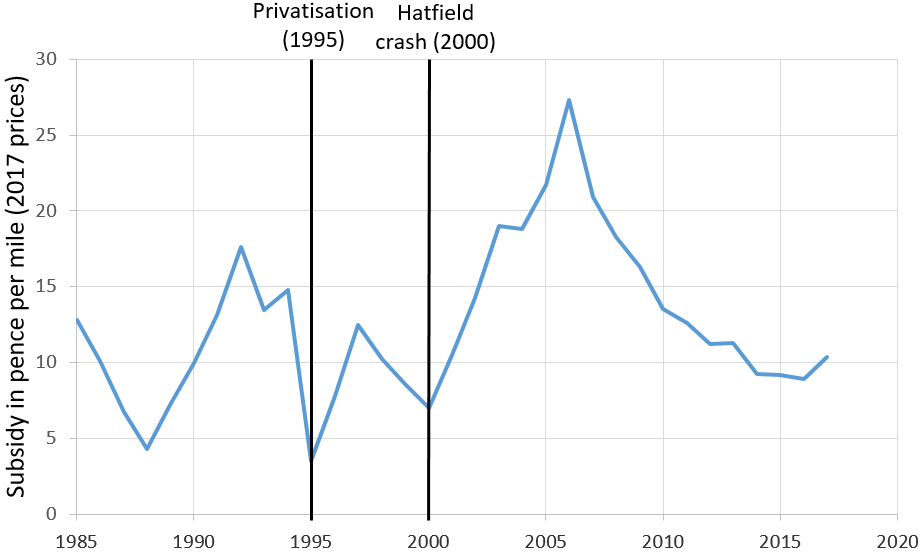
UK rail subsidy per passenger journey 1982–2017 in terms of pounds in 2017 prices, showing the initial decline in subsidy after privatisation, followed by a steep rise following the aftermath of the Hatfield crash in 2000 then a decrease

After initially decreasing by over half, rail subsidies spiralled after the Hatfield rail crash in 2000. In 1994, the total government support received by British Rail was £1.627m, (£2.168m in 2005 terms, adjusted by RPI), whilst in 2005, government support from all sources totalled £4.593m. Once the extra safety investment after the Hatfield crash had finished, subsidies have since been brought under control. Rail subsidies have increased from £3.3 billion in 1992–93 to £9.3 billion in 2018–19 (in current prices), although subsidy per journey has fallen from £4.39 per journey to £2.57 per journey. However, this masks great regional variation, as in 2014–15 funding varied from "£1.41 per passenger journey in England to £6.51 per journey in Scotland and £8.34 per journey in Wales."

=== Efficiency ===
One of the principal expectations from privatisation was that the railway service could be delivered more efficiently in the private sector because of the profit motive. According to Dr David Turner, the expectation that there were considerable costs that could be slashed from the system was not fulfilled; new operators found that BR had already done much of what could be done to improve efficiency. According to one dataset published by the Rail Delivery Group, "day-to-day industry costs have increasingly been covered by non-government revenues, as industry-generated revenue covered 99% of industry running costs in 2013–14 compared with 72% in 1997–98". Since 1997–98, train company operating costs per passenger mile have reduced by 20% in real terms. The privatisation of British Rail generated £800 million in savings due to efficiency gains by 2001.

The revenue earned from the rail companies from their operating activities has decreased when looking at the percentage of total rail system revenue, and public funding has increased in real terms. The British rail network has never at any point in recent history managed to cover its costs from passenger fares. Government in recent years has reportedly set a target of recovering 75% of costs from passengers, a figure achieved only once since privatisation, but several times before.

Expenditure can be broken down as follows:

Rail expenditure
Cost	Percentage
Investment in the rail network	26
Industry staff costs	25
Maintaining track and trains	22
Cost of trains	11
Interest payments and other costs	9
Fuel for trains	4
Train company profits	3

=== Profitability ===
Journalist Aditya Chakrabortty published calculations by the Centre for Research on Socio-Cultural Change indicating that "in the financial year ending in March 2012, the train companies gained an average return of 147% on every pound they put into their business." However, fullfact.org found that in reality the amount of return made after subsidy and paying money back to the government was 3.4% for the financial year ending March 2012 (i.e. the same period).

=== Research ===
Professor Roderick Smith at Imperial College London has suggested that as a result of the privatisation of British Rail, the UK's research and development of rail has slowed immensely. As the British Rail Research Division (BR Research) was sold to AEA Technology and became a consulting organisation, focused on providing advice to solve immediate problems, most rail research since privatisation had been performed on an ad hoc basis. Whereas BR Research was in the 1960s and 1970s described as a "world-class" rail research organisation, much of its specialised equipment had been dispersed or unused since privatisation, similarly to other now-privatised research divisions such as the CEGB, and British Gas. The loss of rail research also came about as national guidance, which organised and prioritised research, has no post-privatisation equivalent.

Railtrack additionally felt no need to maintain research capacity, leading to an almost complete lack of technical leadership. This meant that, in the aftermath of the Hatfield rail crash, expensive consultancy had to be sourced from external sources with a large portion coming from the US.

This decline in UK railway research can be measured in the papers published in the Journal of Rail and Rapid Transit. Prior to privatisation, about 60% of the papers published in this journal came from the UK, with the bulk of these coming from BR Research, whereas in 2004, 80 of the papers came from abroad, five or six papers a year (out of about 40 total) originating from the UK.

=== Political control ===
One of the benefits promoted for privatisation is that it would remove railways from short-term political control which would damage such an industry reliant on long-term investment. This has not happened and, with the latest changes that have been made to the railway structure, some say that the industry is more under government control than ever before. This was consolidated in September 2013 when the borrowing needs of Network Rail were once more taken under HM Treasury control and added to the Public Sector Borrowing Requirement, effectively renationalising the government-owned not-for-profit company which had been created by Minister for Transport Stephen Byers after the collapse of Railtrack.

=== Ownership ===
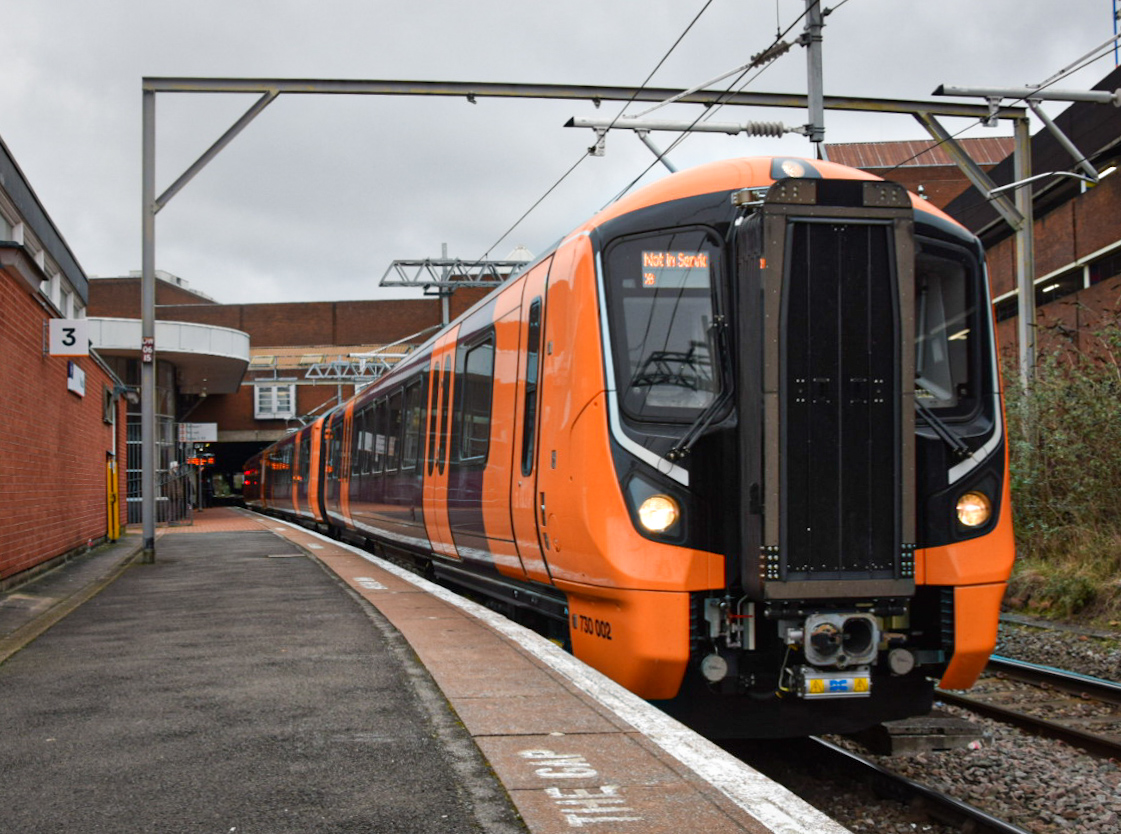
West Midlands Railway, a rail franchise operator owned by Abellio

In theory, privatisation was meant to open up railway operations to the free market and encourage competition between multiple private companies. Critics have pointed to the fact that many of the franchises have ended up in the common ownership of the few dominant transport groups such as Abellio, Arriva, FirstGroup, Go-Ahead Group, Keolis, National Express and Stagecoach Group, either as wholly owned subsidiaries, or as part owners of franchisees or other holding groups. Since these groups all had their origins in the earlier deregulation and consolidation of bus services, it also meant that in some cases there was now a common private owner of both the bus and train operator on some routes.

Criticism has also arisen due to the fact many of the private companies are themselves owned by the state-owned transport concerns of other nations, including the largest freight operator. Several passenger franchises are owned either in part or in full by subsidiaries or joint ventures of foreign governments; Abellio being owned by the Dutch government's Nederlandse Spoorwegen, Arriva by the German government's Deutsche Bahn, the French government's SNCF holding a 25% in Keolis and the Hong Kong government owning 75% of MTR Corporation. Critics have also pointed out that the franchise system does not encourage true competition, although supporters point out that privatisation has enabled any private company to compete, as an open access operator. In July 2015, the Competition and Markets Authority (CMA) introduced plans to increase competition for inter-city routes, laying out four possible options for reform:

1. retaining the existing market structure, but with significantly increased open access operations
2. two franchisees for each franchise
3. more overlapping franchises
4. licensing multiple operators, subject to conditions (including public service obligations)

=== Disputes ===
A necessary side-effect of splitting the railway network into various parts owned by different private companies, with their relations between each other and the government dictated by contracts, is the requirement for a system of dispute resolution, up to and including settling disputes in the courts. Critics of privatisation have argued that these systems are costly and time-consuming, and ultimately serve no real purpose when compared to dispute resolution in markets where there is genuine competition.

A major dispute arose after the Hatfield rail crash in 2000, when Railtrack imposed over 1,200 emergency speed restrictions on the network as a precautionary measure against further track failures. With political intervention stalled, eventually the passenger and freight train operators—who were losing very large sums of money as a result of the severe operational disruption which was taking place—applied to the Rail Regulator for enforcement action against Railtrack. That action was taken almost immediately and normal network performance was established a few months later.

== Media coverage ==
=== Positive ===
A study by the European Commission which looked at how the railways in Europe have progressed and improved since the 1990s found that the UK network was most improved out of all the 27 EU nations from 1997 to 2012. The report examined a range of 14 different factors and the UK came top in four of the factors, second and third in another two and fourth in three, coming top overall. The Adam Smith Institute has written that although it would prefer more competition within the system, privatisation has led to an explosion in passenger numbers.

In 2013, The Guardian wrote that "on balance, rail privatisation has been a huge success" in terms of passenger numbers, fares and public subsidy, as well as Britain having both the safest railways in Europe and "most frequent services amongst eight European nations tested by a consumer group". In 2015, it released an editorial saying that again, despite some problems, privatisation has delivered many improvements. The editorial said that although privatisation 20 years ago was an ideological move, to renationalise the railways at a time when they are quickly growing would also be motivated by ideology. In 2015, The Daily Telegraph wrote that "a state-owned railway would be a costly mistake" for three reasons. Firstly, it would be prohibitively expensive, secondly the trains are not owned by the operators but by third-party leasing companies and thirdly that EU law enshrines the right of open access operators such as Grand Central to operate free from government control.

The Independent explained that the reason for high fares was to fund the programme of investment and upgrades which are currently going on and whilst private companies do make large profits, they are small compared to the total cost and the private expertise means the companies are run more efficiently than if they were state-run. It also said that the reason fares are higher than in other European countries is that there is less public subsidy and that lowering fares would mean increasing taxes. For example, railway subsidies in France in 2013 were €13.2 billion (£9.5 billion) compared to £4 billion in the UK. However, this has increased considerably in the early 2020s, particularly following the COVID-19 pandemic. Government subsidies accounted for £11.9 billion of operators' income for the year April 2022 to March 2023.

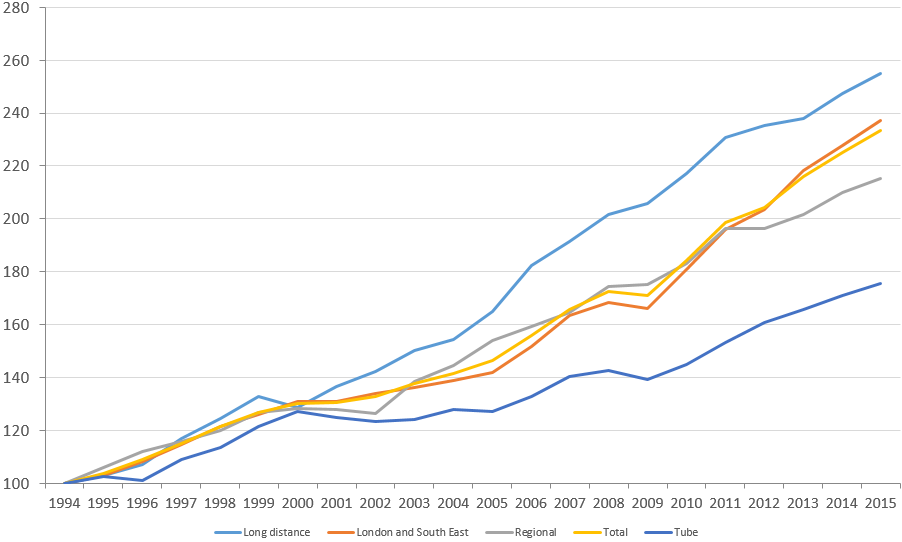
Increase in passenger rail by sector 1994–2015, as well as a comparison with the London Underground (Tube)

In a 2016 article for The Independent, Simon Calder argued that the rail industry was a victim of its own success in increasing passenger numbers. This has led to overcrowding on trains and some train companies were having to run trains 2 minutes apart during the whole morning rush hour from 6am to 10am, reducing reliability until Network Rail can perform "heavy-duty reworking of Victorian infrastructure" in order to relieve the pressure. Calder's article quoted Mark Smith (a station manager for Charing Cross, London Bridge and Cannon Street in the early 1990s who later started the seat61.com international rail website) as saying that Britain was doing better than the rest of Europe. Smith stated: "We have the safest and fastest-growing railway in Europe. We're re-opening stations and branch lines whilst France and others contemplate closures and cuts. We are revitalising our Caledonian and Cornish sleeper services whilst the Germans prepare to surrender all of theirs at the end of this year. Even our on-time performance stacks up surprisingly well against the French, Germans or Italians these days, with my own local operator Chiltern Railways even giving the Swiss a run for their money."

Lew Adams, General Secretary of the Associated Society of Locomotive Engineers and Firemen (ASLEF), who vigorously opposed the privatisation of British Rail, declared in 2004: "I was vehement that we wanted to stay in the public sector, and of course there were all the usual concerns trade unionists have regarding privatisation: safety issues, job losses, protecting the conditions of service and pensions. But accepting the will of Parliament, it was time to look at the arguments. So we said to management, 'Well, if that's what you want, this is what we want'. Today I cannot argue against the private entrepreneur coming into the rail industry. We are running 1,700 more trains per day since it was privatised. The entrepreneurs built traffic to the extent that we are having to build more infrastructure. What is true is true: £4.2 billion has been spent on new trains. We never saw that in all the years I've been in the rail industry. All the time it was in the public sector, all we got were cuts, cuts, cuts. And today there are more members in the trade union, more train drivers, and more trains running. The reality is that it worked, we've protected jobs, and we got more jobs. If a private company is making more money, I look at that from a union's point of view, 'Well, that looks like a wage increase to me'. And we can argue that. And the more secure they are and the more productive they are in delivering train services, well, that means more jobs. I was there when the public railways had some 600,000 people and it came down to 100,000 in the time I worked in the rail industry. Now we are expanding on jobs."

=== Negative ===
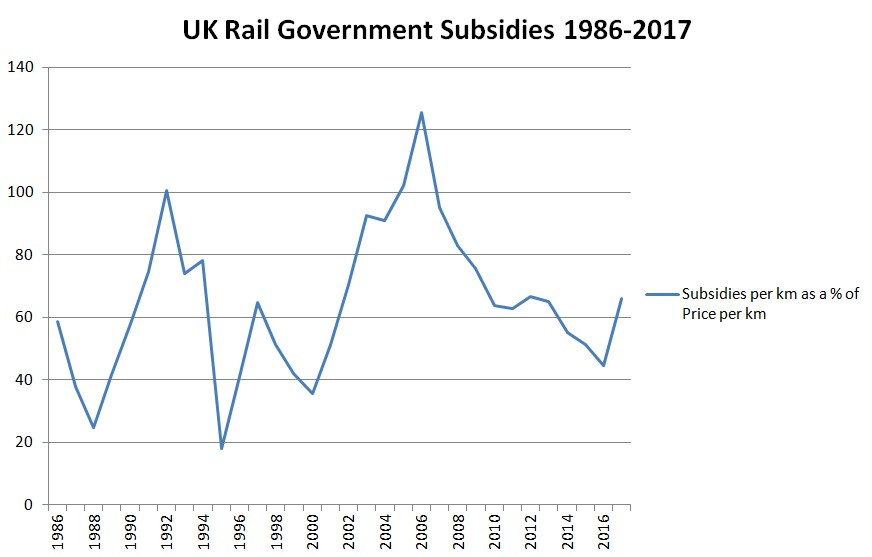
Percentage of UK rail costs covered by subsidy 1986–2017

The rail franchising system has in the past been a subject of criticism from companies, passengers, union leaders and some MPs. It has been said that the system is too complex and involves too many companies, some of which were merely sub-contractors. This has led to confusion about responsibilities, led to several safety-critical incidents and incurred high costs for companies and passengers. This is one of the reasons which led Network Rail to take back into its direct control all responsibility for infrastructure maintenance, whereas previously the company had used subcontractors. Multiple examples of problems with the DfT's original franchising model were highlighted by the InterCity East Coast franchise, when first GNER and then National Express East Coast and Virgin Trains East Coast handed the franchise back when staged franchise payments to DfT became greater than the revenues that could be extracted.

Some observers—such as the rail journalist and author Christian Wolmar—argue that the whole idea of separating track from train operations in this way is fundamentally misconceived, being based on the model of air transport, where the infrastructure, engineering and operational considerations are entirely different. The subsidy of some £4 billion in 2013 was at least twice as big as at the time of privatisation in the 1990s.

Two British academics, Shaw and Docherty, wrote in 2014 that "of all the European countries that came to investigate Britain's great railway privatisation experiment, not a single one has chosen to adopt the same approach". Shaw and Docherty further wrote that 'the domestic railway network has, compared to mainland Europe, been "starved of investment for decades, has been considerably reduced in scope, is significantly overcrowded and in many cases is not a particularly comfortable way to travel. ... [T]he system costs a fortune." The pair note that 'whilst other [European] countries have ... developed wide-ranging electrified and increasingly significant high speed railways ... the UK has achieved comparatively little ... What is more, at least some in the government seem to regard this approach to investment as having been a success'. An estimated 30% efficiency gap in railway operations compared with the continent contributes to an overall efficiency gap in transport "equivalent to the loss of [Heathrow] Terminal 5, HS1 or two Jubilee Line Extensions every year". Academics have criticised the privatisation arguing that BR was not actually privatised in the conventional sense, but operates under governmental control with private companies subcontracted to manage franchises, resulting in high costs to the taxpayer.

In November 2014, The Independent ran an article writing: "Foreign governments are making hundreds of million pounds a year running British public services, according to an Independent investigation highlighting how privatisation is benefiting overseas—rather than UK—taxpayers." Earlier in December 2008, The Daily Telegraph had headlined: "Train fares cost more than under British Rail".

== Public opinion and campaigns ==
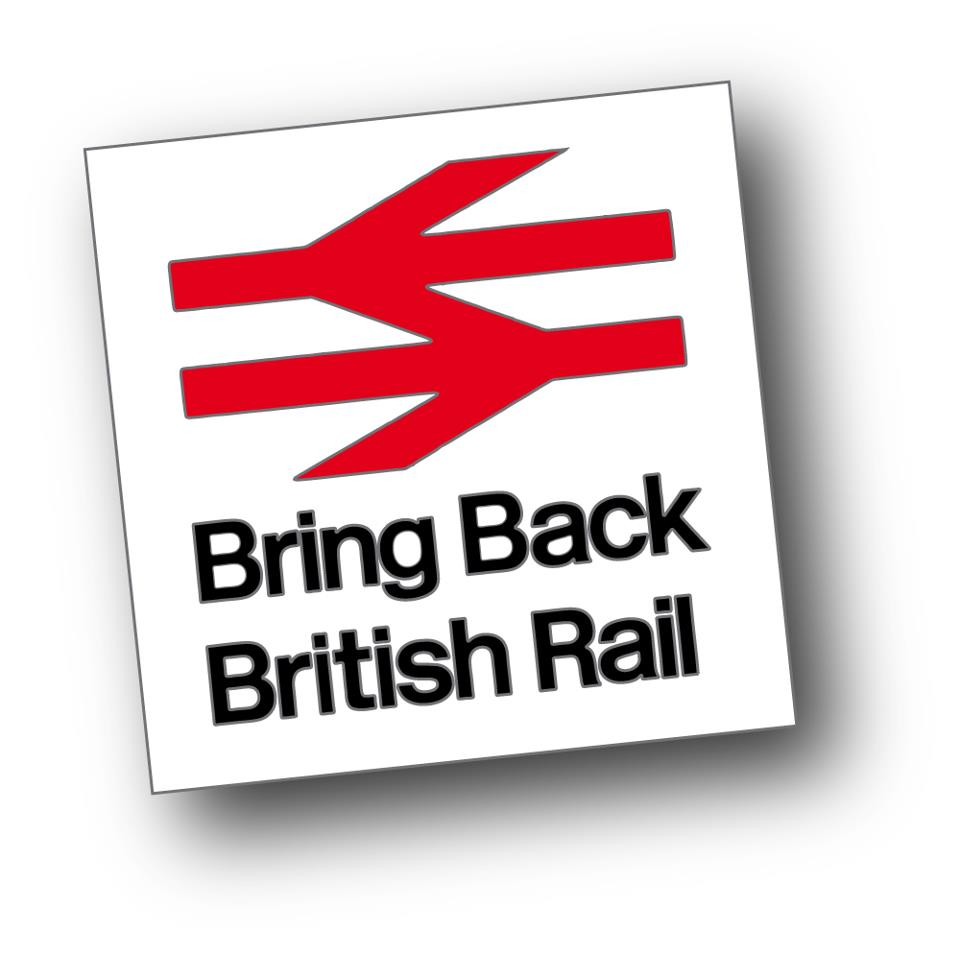
Bring Back British Rail logo

The Bring Back British Rail campaign for renationalisation was formed in 2009 by artist Ellie Harrison. A 2012 poll showed that 70% of voters supported renationalising the railways, whilst 23% supported continued privatisation. According to a 2013 YouGov poll, 66% of the public supported bringing the railways into public ownership. According to the Office of Rail and Road, as of 2016 there was 62% support for public ownership of train-operating companies. A poll of 1,500 adults in Britain in June 2018 showed 64% support renationalising Britain's railways, 19% would oppose renationalisation and 17% did not know.

== Political positions post-privatisation ==
Since privatisation, both the subsequent parties of government in Britain, as well as the official opposition and other political parties, have all offered various levels of support for the post-privatisation system, as well as proposals for reform, up to and including renationalisation in various forms.

=== Labour government policy (1997–2010) ===
The Conservative government of John Major lost the 1997 general election and were replaced by a Labour government. The Labour government did not fulfil its earlier commitment to keep the railways in the public sector. Instead, it left the new structure in place, even completing the privatisation process with the last remaining sales. In 2004, the Labour Party Conference voted by 2 to 1 in favour of a TSSA motion calling on the government to take the TOCs back into public ownership as franchises expired. The policy was however immediately ruled out by the then Transport Secretary Alistair Darling. After 13 years in power, Labour lost the 2010 general election, which resulted in a coalition government formed by the Conservatives and Liberal Democrats.

=== Conservative government position (2010–2024) ===
In September 2020, the Government abolished most of the rail franchises, although the Scottish Government allowed the Caledonian Sleeper franchise to continue until 2023. On 20 May 2021, the Government announced a white paper that would reform the industry's structure. Network Rail had already been renationalised in 2014, and most management of the passenger railway, including Network Rail's infrastructure responsibilities as well as the Department for Transport's role as the manager of passenger contracts would pass to Great British Railways. The former franchises would become concessions, under which the operators take very little commercial risk but also have little commercial discretion. The BBC reported that this would represent "the largest shake-up" in the railways since privatisation, whilst The Guardian called the new model 'simplified, but still substantially privatised', although its reference to 'UK railways' was misleading, as Northern Ireland Railways are managed separately.

On 19 October 2022, Transport Secretary Anne-Marie Trevelyan announced that the Transport Bill which would have set up Great British Railways would not go ahead in the current parliamentary session. In February 2023, Transport Secretary Mark Harper confirmed the government's commitment to GBR and rail reform.

==== McNulty report ====
The coalition government commissioned the independent McNulty report into the "value for money" of the rail system. This was published in 2011, stating that "it seems unlikely that renationalisation would lead to a reduction in costs", saying that "where Government has taken control of aspects of the rail system, costs have tended to increase rather than decline". The report concluded that "many of the arguments for renationalisation are formed from the failings of the existing system, and the Study considers that much more can be gained by improving the performance of the current system rather than embarking on a costly programme of renationalisation, which is unlikely to lead to an overall reduction in costs."

In 2013, 20 years after rail privatisation, Secretary of State for Transport Patrick McLoughlin celebrated "20 years of rising investment" and "extraordinary growth on our railway", and declared that the only plans of the Opposition were "opposing competition, letting union bosses call the shots and cutting off private investment". According to him: "that would mean higher fares, fewer services, more crowding, an industry once again in decline. It would be a tragedy for passengers". Government policy has focused on building a new high speed line, which was approved by Parliament in early 2017, as well as other upgrades to the rail network.

=== Labour government (2024–present ) ===
On 25 May 2025, Labour's renationalisation of the UK's railways began as the train operator South Western Railway was taken into public ownership.

Passenger train operators continue to be renationalised, with services to be managed at some future time by Great British Railways. As of October 2025, c2c (on 20 July 2025) and Greater Anglia (on 12 October 2025) have also been taken into public ownership.

Six operators remain in the private sector: Avanti West Coast, Chiltern Railways, CrossCountry, East Midlands Railway, Govia Thameslink Railway, and Great Western Railway. All six are expected to have been taken into public ownership by 2027.

=== Official opposition ===
==== Conservative ====
In 2006, the Conservative Party's shadow transport spokesman, Chris Grayling, said that the 1996 split of the rail industry into track and train components was a mistake which had increased costs: 'We think, with hindsight, that the complete separation of track and train into separate businesses at the time of privatisation was not right for our railways. We think that the separation has helped push up the cost of running the railways—and hence fares—and is now slowing decisions about capacity improvements. Too many people and organisations are now involved in getting things done—so nothing happens. As a result, the industry lacks clarity about who is in charge and accountable for decisions'.

In 2007, the Conservative Party were consulting upon options for the future. Several changes were proposed including a shift to regional operators owning the track and trains for their regions. In their view the separation of track ownership from the service providers had proved a failure, and 'the separation has helped push up the cost of running the railways'. Such a shift would represent a return to the old British Rail model, but implemented by non-government organisations and franchise holders. However, critics say that were such a model to be applied to basic rail infrastructure, it would risk replicating the original mistake of the 1993 Railways Act—which fragmented the operation of train services amongst two dozen different operators. Many of these share infrastructure and run competing services. Such a plan would be unworkable without the prior consolidation of existing franchises into just a small handful of regional operators.

==== Labour ====
In 2012, the Labour leader Ed Miliband hesitantly suggested the Party might put a promise to renationalise the railways in their 2015 general election manifesto. The policy was later dropped in favour of keeping the current system in place and creating a government-backed Intercity franchise to compete with the other train operators.

In 2015, the Labour Party elected Jeremy Corbyn as its leader, who favoured bringing the railways back into public ownership. At his first party conference as leader, Corbyn proposed taking each franchise back into public ownership as they came to the natural end of their contracts (i.e. without exercising break clauses), leading to a third of the railway being publicly owned by the end of Parliament in 2025.

This was included in the Labour Party's manifesto for the 2017 United Kingdom general election and the 2019 United Kingdom general election. It was then included in their manifesto for the 2024 election, in which Labour won a majority.

=== Other ===
The Green Party call for renationalisation of the network. The Green Party committed to renationalisation in their 2015 manifesto, reconfirming this at their Autumn Conference in Birmingham in September 2014. Caroline Lucas' Private Member's Bill called for the end of franchising altogether. Lucas argued that allowing the individual franchises, when they expire or when a company fails to meet its franchise conditions, to fall back into public ownership will avoid expensive compensation to the rail companies, saving over £1 billion per year for the public.

The Scottish Labour Party and the Scottish Greens advocated for the renationalisation of the First ScotRail contract, which was instead awarded to Abellio by the Scottish government in 2014. In October 2014, then Scottish National Party (SNP) Transport Minister Keith Brown said 'Scotland's railway has attracted a world leading contract to deliver for rail staff and passengers'.

The Social Democratic Party supports renationalising the railways.

In 2021, the Welsh Government put their main railway service operator, Transport for Wales Rail into public ownership from KeolisAmey Wales.

In 2022, the Scottish Government brought the main Scottish operator into public ownership as ScotRail.

== See also ==
- Campaign to Electrify Britain's Railways
- History of rail transport in Great Britain 1995 to date
- List of companies operating trains in the United Kingdom
- Rail transport in Great Britain
- Railway nationalization
- Transport in the United Kingdom
- Tom Winsor § Rail Regulator 1999–2004
