= Financing of the rail industry in Great Britain =

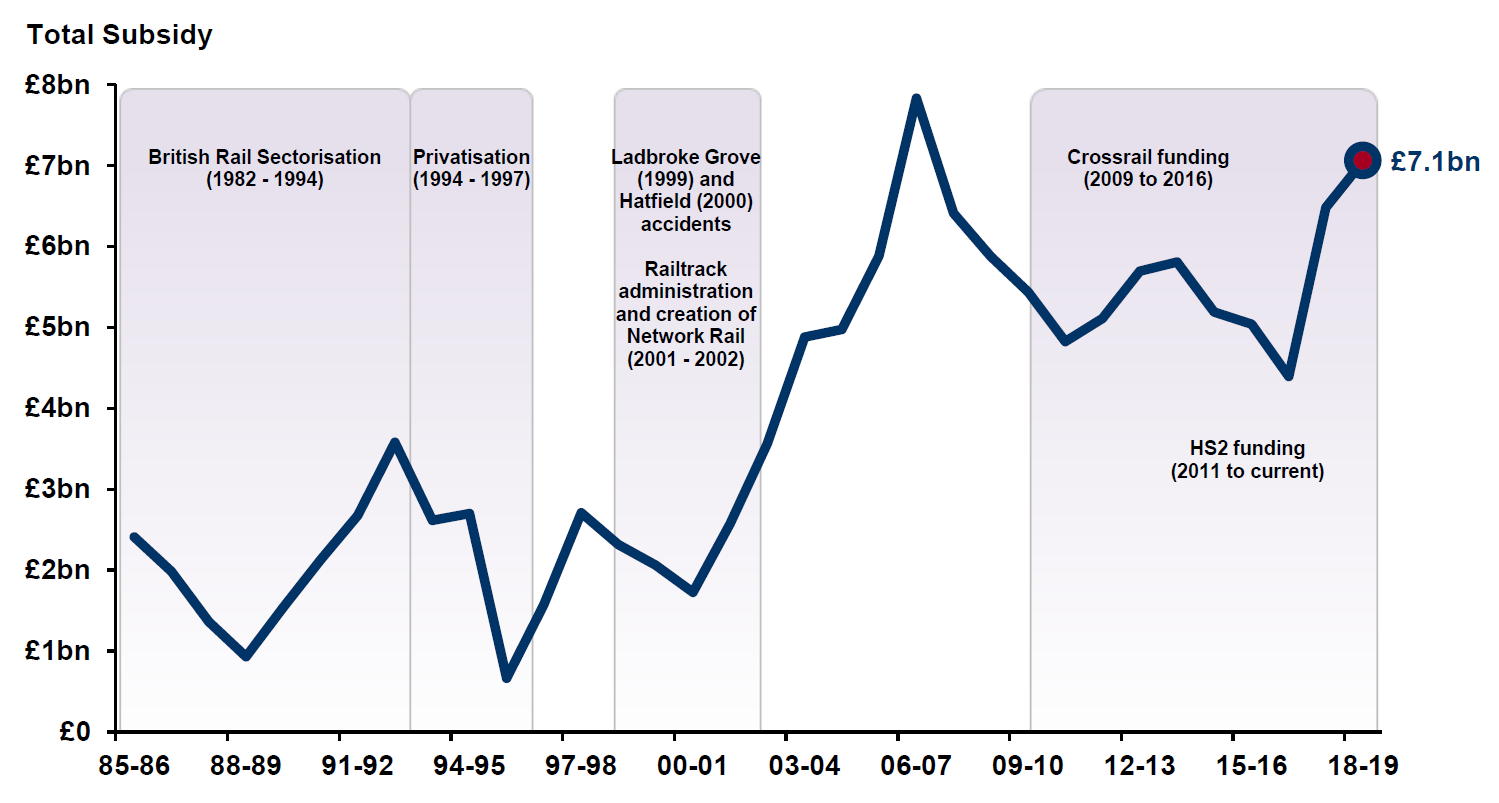
GB rail subsidy 1985–2019 in 2018 prices, showing a short decline after privatisation, followed by a steep rise following the Hatfield crash in 2000 then a further increase to fund Crossrail and HS2

The financing of the rail industry in Great Britain is how rail transport in Great Britain is paid for. Most of the industry's income comes from passengers, with the government also providing rail subsidies, and income from property and freight also providing a small proportion. The majority of the expenditure (£12.1 billion) is spent by train operating companies on leasing/maintaining trains, paying staff, and purchasing fuel. Network Rail spends the other £6.6 billion on maintaining and upgrading track, stations, tunnels, signals and bridges.

== Train operating companies ==
The train operating companies collect money from the passengers via fares (£9.4 billion in 2015/16) and other forms of income (e.g. parking and catering) and spend it on running trains. They spent £2.8 billion on staffing, £0.6 billion on fuel, £1.4 billion on leasing trains, £1.3 billion on infrastructure access charges and £2.8 billion on other expenditure. They also paid out £228 million in dividends, around 1.2% of the total industry expenditure.

== Network Rail ==
Network Rail maintains and upgrades the rail infrastructure in Great Britain. In 2015/16, it spent £3.1 billion on renewals and £3.2 billion on enhancements.

== Passenger income ==
Passenger income is made up of fares as well as car parking charges and on-board catering.

=== Regulated fares ===
Certain fares (about 40%) are regulated by the government. This includes Season tickets on most commuter journeys, some Off-Peak return tickets on long distance journeys and Anytime tickets around major cities. The government uses July's Retail Prices Index (RPI) measure of inflation to determine the increase in the price of these fares. Currently price rises on regulated fares can increase by at most RPI inflation.

== Government support ==
Government support comes through three main mechanisms:

- A direct grant to Network Rail
- Subsidies to train operating companies (TOCs) from central government
- Subsidies given by devolved administrations, either countries such as Scotland, Wales or cities which have some control over transport such as London, Manchester or Liverpool.

Funding varies from region to region, with £1.41 per passenger journey in England to £6.51 per journey in Scotland and £8.34 per journey in Wales.

Since becoming a public sector body in September 2014, Network Rail borrows directly from government. Additionally government loans have been made to the Greater London Authority and Transport for London to support the building of Crossrail.

=== Direct grant ===
The government gave £3.8 billion to Network Rail in 2015/16.

=== TOC subsidies ===
In 2015/16 the government gave out £2.4 billion in subsidies and received £3.0 billion in franchise payment, so received a net total of £0.6 billion.

=== Regional subsidies ===
Certain regions have the ability to subsidise services within their area. Cities such as London, Liverpool and Manchester do this through Transport for London, Merseytravel and Transport for Greater Manchester respectively. Scotland and Wales gave out £0.8 billion and £0.2 billion respectively.

== See also ==
- British Rail
- Campaign to Bring Back British Rail
- Campaign to Electrify Britain's Railways
- Impact of the privatisation of British Rail
- Privatisation of British Rail
