= Jonael Schickler =

Swiss philosopher

Jonael Angelus Schickler (1976–2002) was a Swiss philosopher who died in a rail crash in England at the age of 25.

== Life ==
Schickler was born in Dornach, Switzerland. His family moved to Forest Row, East Sussex, and he attended Michael Hall, a local Rudolf Steiner school. At the age of sixteen he attended Sevenoaks School.

In 1994 he travelled to India and Nepal and, on his return, matriculated at Sidney Sussex College, Cambridge, where he read social and political sciences, changing to philosophy. He graduated with a first and, after a year as a 'cellist with a Berlin orchestra, returned to Cambridge (Queens' College) to read for a doctorate in the Faculty of Divinity, under the supervision of George Pattison. Schickler began supervising undergraduates early in his doctoral career and he was appointed Director of Studies in Philosophy at Hughes Hall, Cambridge in 2001. On 10 May 2002 Schickler was killed in the Potters Bar rail crash.

== Philosophical work ==
At the time of his death, Schickler left behind the completed manuscript of his doctorate as well as the article Death and Life in Modern Thinking, and a large quantity of unpublished material. In November 2004, his thesis was published in German under the title Metaphysik als Christologie, edited by Peter von Ruckteschell and published by Koenigshausen and Neumann. The thesis appeared in English in December 2005, edited by Nick Green and Fraser Watts and published by Ashgate Publishing, under the title Metaphysics as Christology: An Odyssey of the Self from Kant and Hegel to Steiner.

Metaphysics as Christology is part of a larger project in which Schickler was engaged when he died to demonstrate an organic continuity and development between Aristotelian ontology, the 'Kantian turn' and Hegelian dialectic, reaching its fulfilment in the work of Rudolf Steiner. Two other parts of the project exist in complete, albeit unpublished form, From Dialectic to Phenomenology and Aristotle: Man and Metaphysics, and may be published in the future. Other planned parts of the project for which only notes exist are: Phenomenology and Depth Psychology (which was to discuss Nietzsche, Heidegger, Wittgenstein and Jung), Structural Phenomenology (an idea taken from Herbert Witzenmann), and The Recovery of Nature (which included an assessment of the prospects for a rebirth of alchemy).

In Metaphysics as Christology, Schickler examines the key philosophical problems with which Kant and Hegel grappled, and finds in the work of Rudolf Steiner the essence of a solution to them; he claims that Steiner returned to Hegel's philosophical problems but was better able to solve them. Schickler uses these philosophical debates about knowledge and truth to understand the significance of Christ. As theologian Martin Wendte describes, Schickler's "general ontology, according to his philosophical thesis, implies a theological telos, resurrection. In effect, Schickler presents an onto-theo-logy, or, as his title has it: Metaphysics as Christology."

Building on the work of Hegel, Schickler argues that Christ has made possible the developments in human consciousness that restore humanity's relationship to the surrounding world. Fraser Watts contributed the foreword and George Pattison an extensive preface.

Watts commented at the time of Schickler's death,

Jonael was an intellectually brilliant student with a passionate commitment to his philosophical work. He had strong spiritual beliefs, stemming from his family background and his education at a Rudolf Steiner school. He had hoped that his work would contribute to a new understanding of the potential of philosophy, and was half-way through an ambitious five-part academic project. Though passionately serious, he also had a physical energy, a sense of fun, a warm heart, and many friends. His death is a great tragedy. It robs the world of an enormously promising young man who could have had a great impact for good.
