= Schickler =

Schickler is a surname. Notable people with the surname include:

- David Schickler (born 1969), American writer and screenwriter
- Eric Schickler (born 1969), American political scientist
- Jonael Schickler (1976–2002), Swiss philosopher

== See also ==
- 22546 Schickler, a main-belt asteroid
