= Privatisation of British Rail =

Transfer of ownership and operation of British railways from government to private sector

The privatisation of British Rail was the process by which ownership and operation of the railways of Great Britain passed from government control into private hands. Begun in 1994, the process was largely completed by 1997. The deregulation of the industry was in part motivated by the enactment of EU Directive 91/440 in 1991, which aimed to create a more efficient railway network by creating greater competition.

British Railways (BR) had been in state ownership since 1948, under the control of the British Railways Board (BRB). Under the Conservative government of Margaret Thatcher elected in 1979, various state-owned businesses were gradually sold off, including various auxiliary and supporting functions related to the railways – Sealink ferries and British Transport Hotels by 1984, Travellers Fare catering by 1988 and British Rail Engineering Limited (train manufacturing) by 1989.

It was under Thatcher's successor John Major that the railways themselves were privatised. Under the Railways Act 1993, the operations of the BRB were broken up and sold off to various parties while various regulatory functions transferred to the newly created office of the Rail Regulator. Ownership of the infrastructure, including the larger stations, passed to the new privately owned company Railtrack, while track maintenance and renewal assets were sold to 13 companies across the network. Ownership of the passenger trains themselves passed to three rolling stock companies (ROSCOs) – the stock being leased out to passenger train operating companies (TOCs) awarded contracts through a new system of rail franchising overseen by the Office of Passenger Rail Franchising (OPRAF). Ownership and operation of rail freight in Great Britain passed to two companies – English Welsh & Scottish (EWS) and Freightliner, fewer than the originally intended six, although numerous new entrants in the sector have since appeared.

The privatisation of the railways was very controversial at the time, and still is, and the impact of this policy is hotly debated. Despite opposition from the Labour Party, who gained power in 1997 under Tony Blair, the process has never been reversed wholesale by any later government, and the system has remained largely unaltered. During the late 2010s, it was announced that a transition towards Great British Railways, a contract-based model to replace the franchise system, would be undertaken. A significant change came in 2001 with the collapse of Railtrack, which saw its assets passed to the state-owned Network Rail (NR), while track maintenance was also brought in-house under NR in 2004. The regulatory structures have also been amended subsequently.

At present day, the thirty year history of modern rail privatisation in Great Brtiain is coming to an end: by the early 2020s, both Wales and Scotland saw their passenger rail franchises renationalised by operatoring companies owned by their respective devolved administrations (Transport for Wales and Scotrail), while the publicly owned Great British Railways is being set up in order to take over the remaining private rail franchise operating companies in England and cross-country starting in 2027.

== Background ==
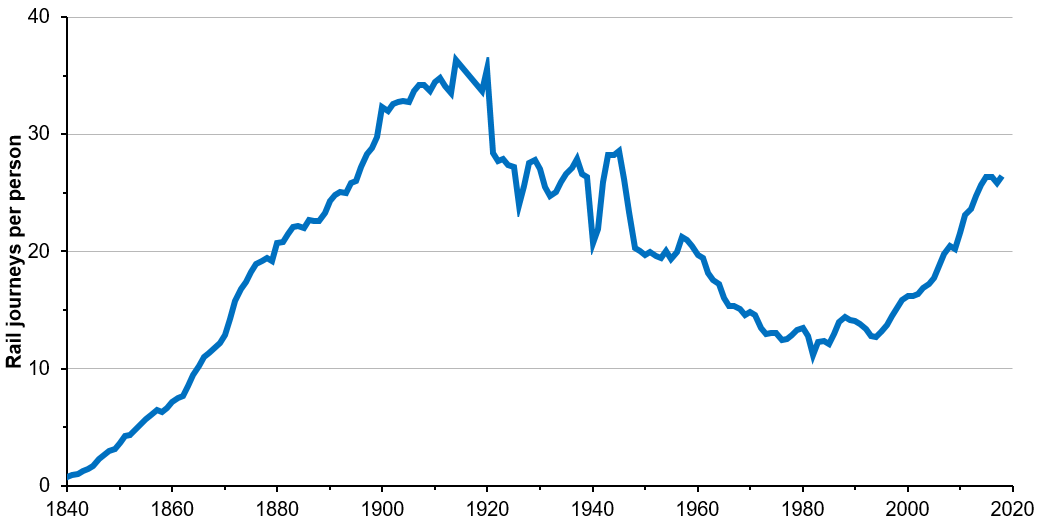
UK rail journeys per capita from 1840 to 2018, showing a steady decline in the decades leading up to privatisation

=== To 1979 ===
Historically, the pre-nationalisation railway companies were almost entirely self-sufficient, including, for example, the production of the steel used in the manufacturing of rolling stock and rails. As a consequence of the nationalisation of the railways in 1948 some of these activities had been hived off to other nationalised industries and institutions, e.g. "Railway Air Services Limited" was one of the forerunners of British Airways; The railways' road transport services, which had carried freight, parcels and passengers' luggage to and from railheads, ultimately became part of the National Freight Corporation, but this transfer did not occur until 1969.

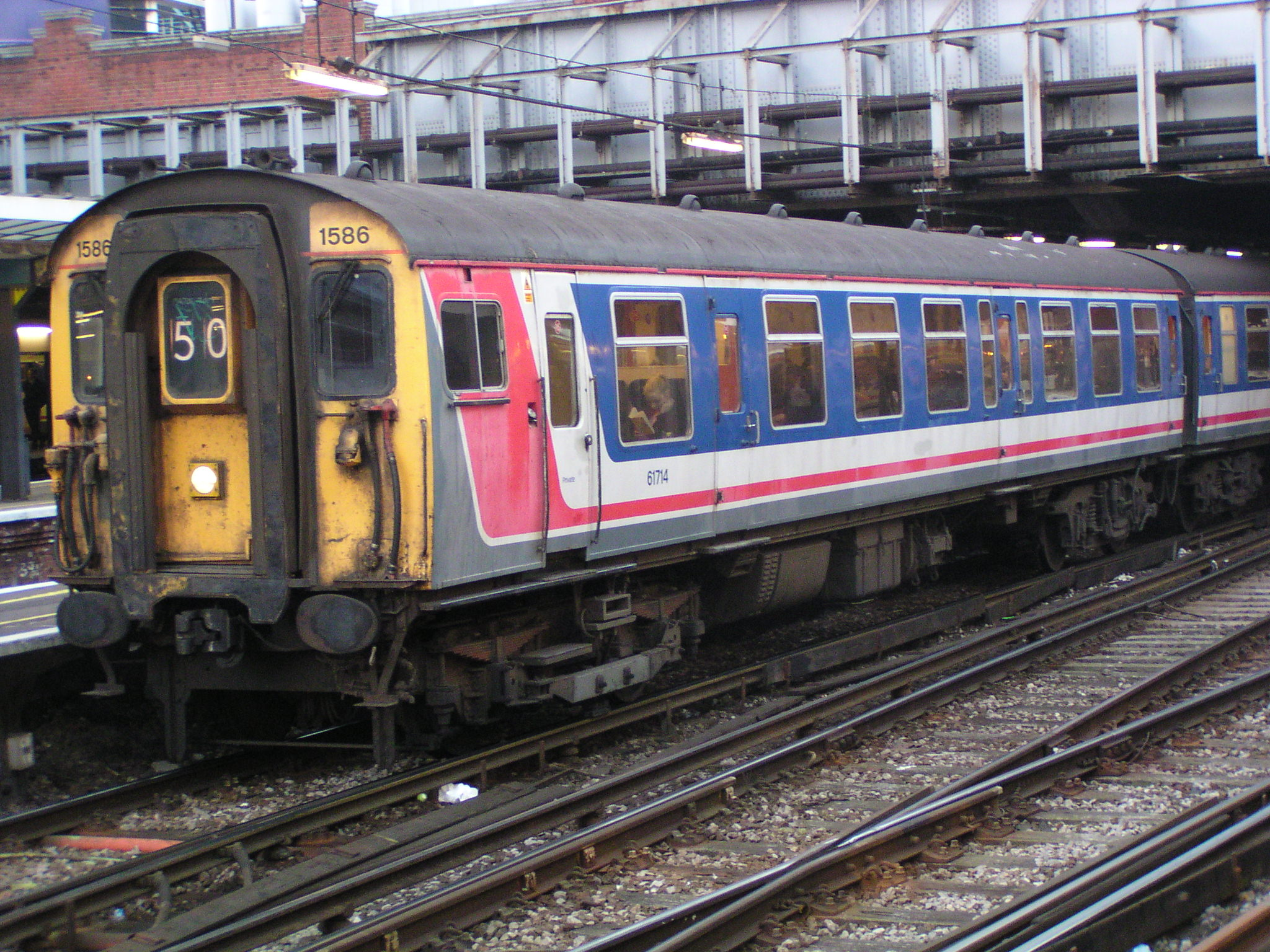
A 1950s Mk1-based Class 411 (4-CEP) "slam-door" EMU at London Victoria station, in Network SouthEast livery (March 2003)

The preferred organisational structure in the 1970s was for the BRB to form wholly owned subsidiaries which were run at an arm's-length relationship, e.g. the railway engineering works became British Rail Engineering Limited (BREL) in 1970; the ferry operations to Ireland, France, Belgium and the Netherlands were run by Sealink, part of the Sealink consortium, which also used ferries owned by the French national railway SNCF, the Belgian Maritime Transport Authority Regie voor maritiem transport/Regie des transports maritimes (RMT/RTM), and the Dutch Zeeland Steamship Company. However, the BRB was still directly responsible for a multitude of other functions, such as the British Transport Police, the British Rail Property Board (which was responsible not just for operational track and property, but also for thousands of miles of abandoned tracks and stations arising from the Beeching cuts and other closure programmes), a staff savings bank, convalescent homes for rail staff, and the internal railway telephone and data comms networks (the largest in the country after British Telecom's), etc.

By 1979, the organisational structure of the BRB's railway operations still largely reflected that of the Big Four British railway companies, which had been merged to create British Railways over 30 years previously. There were five Regions (Scotland being a separate region), each region being formed of several Divisions, and each division of several Areas. There was some duplication of resources in this structure, and in the early 1980s, the divisional layer of management was abolished with its work being redistributed either upwards to the regions or downwards to the areas.

=== 1980s ===
The chain of British Transport Hotels was sold off, mainly one hotel at a time, during 1982. Two years later, Sealink was sold to Sea Containers, who ultimately sold the routes to their current owner, Stena Line. In 1988, catering business Travellers Fare was divested via a private equity-backed management buyout. That same year, British Rail Engineering Limited was split between the major engineering works, which became BREL (1988) Ltd and the (mostly smaller) works that were used for day-to-day maintenance of rolling stock, which became British Rail Maintenance Limited. BREL (1988) Ltd was sold to a consortium of ASEA Brown-Boveri and Trafalgar House in 1989. In 1992, ABB Transportation took full ownership before the unit was merging with Daimler-Benz's train manufacturing interests to form Adtranz in January 1996. Daimler-Benz subsequently took 100% ownership of Adtranz in 1998 before selling it to Bombardier in May 2001.

For reasons of efficiency and to reduce the amount of subsidy required from the government, British Rail undertook a comprehensive organisational restructuring in the late 1980s. The new management structure was based on business sectors rather than geographical regions, and first manifested itself in 1982 with the creation of Railfreight, the BRB's freight operation, and InterCity, though the Inter-City branding had been carried on coaching stock since the early 1970s. Commuter services in the south-east came under the London & South East sector, which would become Network SouthEast in 1986. Services in Scotland were operated by ScotRail, while Provincial sector handled local and rural routes. The regional management structure continued in parallel for a few years before it was abolished. Sectorisation was generally regarded within the industry as a great success, and it was to have a considerable effect on the way in which privatisation would be carried out.

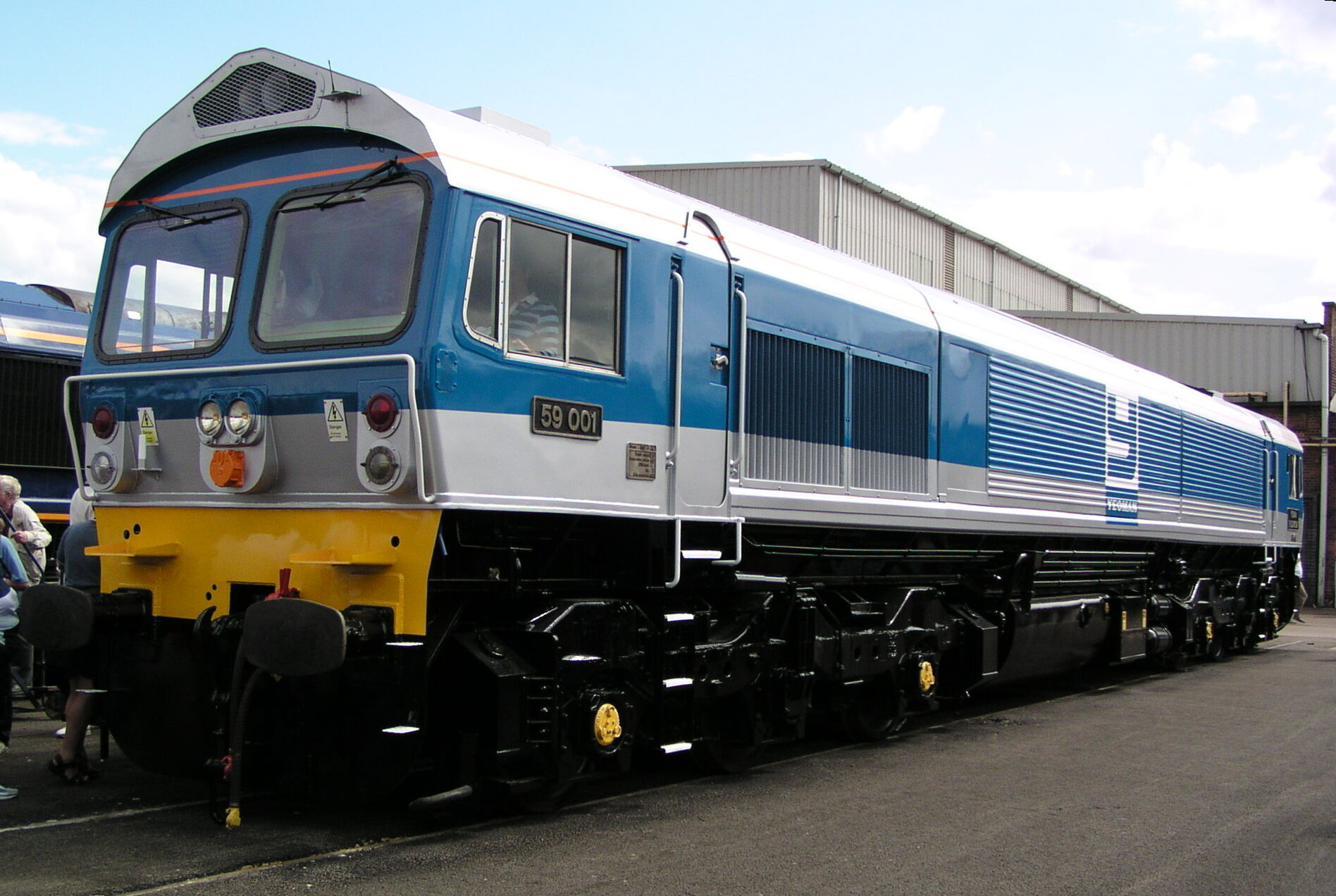
59001 in revised Foster Yeoman livery. Private ownership of locomotives marked the start of a new era in railfreight haulage.

During 1985, what may in retrospect be viewed as the harbinger of private rail operation occurred when the quarry company Foster Yeoman bought a small number of extremely powerful 3600 hp locomotives from General Motors' Electro-Motive Diesel division (GM-EMD), designated Class 59, to operate mineral trains from their quarry in Wiltshire. Although owned and maintained by Foster Yeoman, the Class 59s were staffed by British Rail personnel. During acceptance trials, on 16 February 1986, locomotive 59001 hauled a train weighing 4639 tonnes – the heaviest load ever hauled by a single non-articulated traction unit. Foster Yeoman's Class 59s proved to be extremely reliable, and it was not long before quarry company ARC and privatised power generator National Power also bought small numbers of Class 59s to haul their own trains.

During 1986, discussions were held with Sea Containers that touched on the business possibilities for the break up of British Rail, particularly on the possible takeover of the railway on the Isle of Wight by the company. However, the discussions proved abortive.

In Sweden, the Swedish State Railways was split into two in 1988, creating the Swedish Rail Administration to control the rail infrastructure, and SJ to operate the trains. This restructuring was the first time that a national railway had been divided up in this manner; one of the advantages of this arrangement was that it allowed for local county authorities to tender the provision of local passenger services to the new train operators that appeared. The Swedish system appeared to be very successful initially, although some train operators subsequently went bankrupt. The Swedish experiment was watched with great interest in various other countries during the 1980s and 1990s.

The narrow gauge Vale of Rheidol Railway in Aberystwyth, Mid Wales was unique in Britain, being the only steam railway to be operated by British Rail. During 1988, the Department of Transport started the process of privatising the line. Later that year, it was announced the line had been purchased by the owners of Brecon Mountain Railway, becoming the first part of British Rail to be privatised.

=== 1990s ===
During 1991, following the partly-successful Swedish example and wishing to create an environment where new rail operators could enter the market, the European Union issued EU Directive 91/440. This required of all EU member states to separate "the management of railway operation and infrastructure from the provision of railway transport services, separation of accounts being compulsory and organisational or institutional separation being optional", the idea being that the track operator would charge the train operator a transparent fee to run its trains over the network, and anyone else could also run trains under the same conditions (open access).

In Britain, Margaret Thatcher was forced out as leader of the Conservative Party and succeeded by John Major at the end of 1990. The Thatcher administration had already sold off nearly all the former state-owned industries, apart from the national rail network. Although the previous Transport Secretary Cecil Parkinson had advocated some form of privately or semi-privately operated rail network, this was deemed "a privatisation too far" by Thatcher herself. In its manifesto for the 1992 general election the Conservatives included a commitment to privatise the railways, but were not specific about how this objective was to be achieved. The manifesto claimed that "The best way to produce profound and lasting improvements on the railways is to end BR's state monopoly," although according to The Independent, "many – including within the Tory party – believed that privatisation was merely a mechanism to manage the industry's gradual decline without too heavy a burden on the taxpayer."

Contrary to opinion polls, the Conservatives won the election in April 1992 and consequently had to develop a plan to carry out the privatisation before the Railways Bill was published the next year. The management of British Rail strongly advocated privatisation as one entity, a British Rail plc in effect; Cabinet Minister John Redwood "argued for regional companies in charge of track and trains" but Prime Minister John Major did not back his view; the Treasury, under the influence of the Adam Smith Institute think tank advocated the creation of seven, later 25, passenger railway franchises as a way of maximising revenue. In this instance, it was the Treasury view that prevailed.

== Legislation ==
As a precursor to the main legislation, the British Coal and British Rail (Transfer Proposals) Act 1993 was passed on 19 January 1993. This legislation gave the Secretary of State the power to issue directions to the BRB to sell assets, something which the board was unable to do until then.

The Railways Bill, published in 1993, established a complex structure for the rail industry. British Rail was to be broken up into over 100 separate companies, with most relationships between the successor companies established by contracts, some through regulatory mechanisms (such as the industry-wide network code and the multi-bilateral star model performance regime). Contracts for the use of railway facilities – track, stations and light maintenance depots – must be approved or directed by the Office of Rail & Road, although some facilities are exempt from this requirement. Contracts between the principal passenger train operators and the state are called franchise agreements, and were first established with the Office of Passenger Rail Franchising (OPRAF), then its successor the Strategic Rail Authority and now with the Secretary of State for Transport.

The passage of the Railways Bill was controversial. The public was largely unconvinced of the virtues of rail privatisation and there was much lobbying against the Bill. The Labour Party was implacably opposed to it and promised to renationalise the railways when they got back into office as and when resources allowed. The Conservative chairman of the House of Commons Transport Committee, Robert Adley famously described the Bill as "a poll tax on wheels"; however Adley was known to be a rail enthusiast and his advice was discounted. Adley died suddenly before the Bill completed its passage through Parliament.

The Railways Bill became the Railways Act 1993 on 5 November 1993, and the organisational structure dictated by it came into effect on 1 April 1994. Initially, British Rail was broken up into various units frequently based on its own organisational sectors (Train Operating Units, Infrastructure Maintenance Units, etc. - for more details see below) still controlled by the British Railways Board, but which were sold over the next few years.

== Domestic system ==
=== As implemented ===
The original privatisation structure, created over the three years from 1 April 1994, consisted of passing ownership and operation of the railway to a variety of private companies, regulated by two public offices, Rail Regulator and Director of Passenger Rail Franchising. A newly created company, Railtrack, would be the privately owned infrastructure owner, which would subcontract work to various other companies to perform maintenance. Various other companies would lease and/or operate trains.

In preparation for full privatisation, BR was split up into various parts. Provision of passenger services was split up into twenty-five passenger train operating units (TOUs), known as shadow franchises, split by geographical area and service type. For freight services, six freight operating companies (FOCs) were created - three geographical units for trainload freight (Mainline Freight in the south-east, Loadhaul in the north-east and Transrail in the west), plus Railfreight Distribution for international and wagonload trains, Freightliner for container-carrying trains, and Rail Express Systems for parcels and mail trains. British Rail Infrastructure Services (BRIS) took responsibility for the engineering requirements of the railway. BRIS was subsequently organised for privatisation on the basis of seven infrastructure maintenance units (IMUs), which maintained the railway, and six track renewal units (TRUs), which replaced rail lines, both organised geographically.

Railtrack was the first company created; it took over ownership of all track, signalling and stations. Railtrack proceeded to let out most of the 2,509 stations to the franchised passenger train operators, managing only a handful (twelve, later seventeen) of the largest city termini itself. Since maintenance and renewal of the infrastructure was to be sub-contracted (to the private purchasers of the IMUs and TRUs), Railtrack's directly employed staff consisted mostly of signallers. Railtrack sourced its revenue from track access charges levied on train operators as well as leases of stations and depots; additional funding would come from the British government. The company would spend its finances mostly on the railway network in accordance with plans laid out by the rail regulator.

Three newly created rolling stock leasing companies (ROSCOs) (Angel Trains, Eversholt Rail Group and Porterbrook) were allocated all British Rail's passenger coaches, locomotives, and multiple units. Completion of the privatisation process involved converting the passenger TOUs to train operating companies (TOCs) through the process of franchising, performed in the first instance on a "lowest-cost bidder wins" basis. Freight locomotives and wagons were not passed to ROSCOs, instead being owned directly by the freight train operators. Full privatisation of the freight operators saw five being bought immediately by a consortium led by the Wisconsin Central Transportation Corporation and merged into what became known as the English Welsh & Scottish (EWS) (now DB Cargo UK), leaving just Freightliner as the only other ex-BR freight business to be privatised to someone other than EWS.

The Rail Regulator (the statutory officer at the head of the Office of the Rail Regulator (ORR)) was established to regulate the monopoly and dominant elements of the railway industry, and to police certain consumer protection conditions of operators' licences. The Regulator did this through powers to supervise and control the consumption of capacity of railway facilities (his approval was needed before an access contract for the use of track, stations or certain maintenance facilities could be valid), to enforce domestic competition law, to issue, modify and enforce operating licences and to supervise the development of certain industry-wide codes, the most important of which is the network code. ORR's role only covered economic regulation; crucially reviewing every five years the access charges Railtrack could charge train operators for the operation, maintenance, renewal and enhancement of the national railway network. Safety regulation remained the responsibility of the Health & Safety Executive. The first Rail Regulator was John Swift.

The Director of Passenger Rail Franchising took responsibility for organising the franchising process to transfer the 25 TOUs to the private sector and then develop the re-franchising programme for the future. The first Director of Passenger Rail Franchising was Roger Salmon.

=== Subsequent changes ===
Post-privatisation, the structure of the railways has remained largely the same, and the system is still based on competition between private operators who pay for access to the infrastructure provider and lease rolling stock from the ROSCOs.

A major change has been in the actual owner of the infrastructure. The aftermath of the Hatfield rail crash in 2000 led to severe financial difficulties for Railtrack. Just under a year later, the company was put into a special kind of insolvency by the High Court in England at the direction of the government. The circumstances of this action were controversial, and eventually led to the largest class action lawsuit in British legal history. The administration led to instability in its share price, and on 2 October 2002 a new organisation, Network Rail, bought Railtrack. Network Rail has no shareholders and is a company limited by guarantee, nominally in the private sector but with members instead of shareholders and its borrowing guaranteed by the government. During 2004, Network Rail took back direct control of the maintenance of the track, signalling and overhead lines, although track renewal remained contracted out to the private sector.

Management of the passenger franchising system has also changed; during 2001, the functions of the Director of Passenger Rail Franchising were replaced by the Strategic Rail Authority (SRA), whose remit also included the promotion of freight services. Five years later, the SRA was in turn abolished in favour of direct control by the Department of Transport's Rail Group. Overall, the system of franchising has proceeded as designed, with franchises being either retained or transferred dependent on performance. On nine occasions to date, passenger franchises have had to be taken into (indirect) government ownership, South Eastern Trains (2003–2006), East Coast (2009–2015), London North Eastern Railway (2018–present), Northern Trains (2020–present), Transport for Wales Rail (2021–present), Southeastern (2021–present), ScotRail (2022–present), TransPennine Express (2023–present), and Caledonian Sleeper (2023–present). Over time, some franchises have been merged and contract lengths have been extended; additionally, under the devolution programme, other government bodies have been given input into franchise terms – the Scottish Government with ScotRail, the Welsh Government in Wales & Borders, as well as the Mayor of London and the various passenger transport executives for the services in their respective areas. Since 2005, the Department for Transport has been using the community railway designation to loosen the regulations and lower the costs and increase usage of certain socially necessary routes and services, although these remain within the TOC structure.

In both the freight and passenger sectors, a small number of open access operators (non-franchised operators of trains) have also emerged (some of which have since closed down). In terms of train ownership, the three ROSCOs continue to exist as originally established, although some now lease freight locomotives and wagons to the FOCs. They have also been joined by a variety of new leasing entities, including spot-hire companies offering short-term leases, as well as small-scale train owners offering to lease their private rolling stock. Furthermore, some operators, such as Network Rail, have also purchased some rolling stock themselves.

The regulatory structure has also evolved; in line with changes to the regulation of other privatised industries, the position of Rail Regulator was abolished in 2004, replaced by a nine-member corporate board called the Office of Rail Regulation, incorporating responsibility for safety regulation, previously the remit of the Health & Safety Executive.

== Channel Tunnel infrastructure and services ==
Privatisation of British Rail occurred at the same time as the Channel Tunnel project linking Great Britain with France reached completion, with the tunnel itself being officially opened on 6 May 1994. Key parts of the project were a passenger rail service through the tunnel, dubbed Eurostar, and the building of a new high-speed railway on the British side, the 109-kilometre (68 mile) Channel Tunnel Rail Link (CTRL), to link the tunnel to London.

With the CTRL still at the planning stage, Eurostar trains began operating on 14 November 1994 over the existing railway, with operations on the British sections of the track being done by European Passenger Services (EPS), a subsidiary set up by British Rail. To manage construction of the CTRL, British Rail had also set up another subsidiary, Union Railways. In 1996, in line with the rest of the privatisation process, the government signed a contract with the private company London & Continental Railways (LCR) to build the CTRL, and as part of that deal LCR became the owner of both EPS and Union Railways; LCR renamed EPS as Eurostar thus ending British Rail's input in the project.

As the project progressed, due to financial difficulties both LCR and its subsidiaries underwent various changes in financing, structure and planning, with the government and Railtrack (later Network Rail) becoming involved in the various plans and projects. In 2007, the second stage of the CTRL was finally completed (the CTRL being rebranded at that point as High Speed 1 (HS1). By 2009 the government had assumed full control of LCR, announcing its intention to privatise it to recoup its investment; this was achieved in two stages, with the 2010 sale of a 30-year concession to own and operate HS1, and the 2015 sale of the British stake in the Eurostar operator (renamed in 2009 to Eurostar International Limited, EIL).

Through a subsidiary established in 2003, Network Rail is the maintainer of the infrastructure of HS1. Domestic passenger services are operated on parts of HS1 as part of the Integrated Kent Franchise, these commenced in 2009, operated by Southeastern.

== Impact ==
Rail passengers in Great Britain from 1829–2025

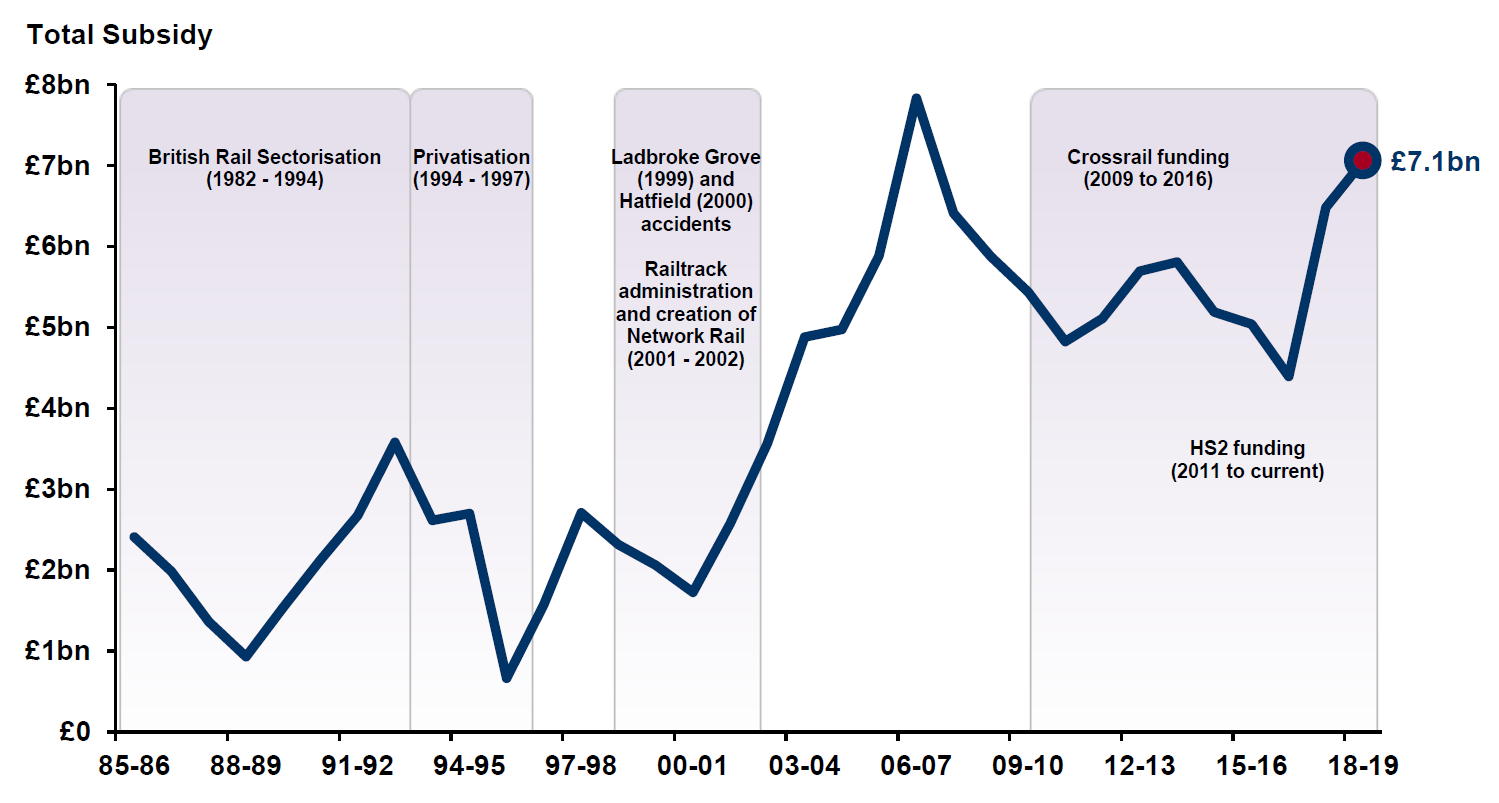
GB rail subsidy 1985–2019 in 2018 prices, showing a short decline after privatisation, followed by a steep rise following the Hatfield crash in 2000 then a further increase to fund Crossrail and HS2

The impact of privatisation has been debated by the public, media and the rail industry ever since the process was completed. Whether to renationalise or otherwise make major changes to the post-privatisation model is an ever-present detail in the election manifestos of British political parties.

Stated benefits of privatisation include improved customer service, and more investment; and stated drawbacks include higher fares, lower punctuality, increased overcrowding (due to fewer carriages in service) and increased rail subsidies.

The major topics of debate concern whether the process has achieved its central aims of increasing levels of investment, performance, and customer satisfaction while reducing the cost to the taxpayer through rail subsidies. Safety also became a major issue after the Hatfield rail crash in 2000 and the Potters Bar rail crash in 2002 exposed flaws in the post-privatisation maintenance regimes.

== See also ==
- Campaign to Bring Back British Rail
- History of rail transport in Great Britain
- Financing of the rail industry in Great Britain
- The Navigators (film) – by Ken Loach, about a group of railwaymen just after privatisation
- Thatcherism
