= Campaign to Bring Back British Rail =

Advocacy group for Transport and Public ownership, based in the United Kingdom

Bring Back British Rail
- Founded: 2009; 17 years ago
- Founder: Ellie Harrison
- Type: Transport campaign group
- Purpose: Transport; Public ownership Consumer rights
- Location(s): Glasgow, Scotland; London, England
- Region served: United Kingdom
- Product: campaigning, lobbying, media, research
- Members: 150,000 (supporters)
- Key people: Ellie Harrison
- Website: bringbackbritishrail.org

The Campaign to Bring Back British Rail is a pressure group in the United Kingdom whose objective is the renationalisation of the British Rail network, which was privatised in the 1990s. In addition to its representation of ordinary passengers, on whose behalf it campaigns for improvements to rail services, it undertakes research for the purpose of lobbying political parties towards the ends of reintroducing a vertically-integrated, publicly owned and operated British railway network. It has over 150,000 supporters UK wide, accumulated since it was founded in 2009, and is managed from two hubs - in Glasgow and London.

== Renationalisation ==
The franchising system was overhauled during the COVID-19 pandemic, amid a collapse in passenger numbers. The system was effectively renationalised briefly to prevent rail companies collapsing, as acknowledged by the ONS at the time. Several train operating companies were brought under state control from 2020 onwards as an operators of last resort including Caledonian Sleeper, LNER, Northern, ScotRail, Southeastern, TransPennine Express and Transport for Wales. The Labour Party committed itself to a formal renationalisation of the rail network following their victory in the 2024 general election. The King's speech in July 2024 described a new public body for the purpose named Great British Railways. Renationalisation is to be achieved simply by not renewing the remaining franchising arrangements as they expire, which is expected to take place over the following years. The policy was celebrated by the Campaign to Bring Back British Rail.

== Public opinion ==
A 2012 poll showed that 70% of voters want a re-nationalisation of the railways, while only 23% supported continued privatisation. According to a 2013 YouGov poll, 66% of the public support bringing the railways into public ownership. According to the Office of Rail and Road, as of 2016 there was 62% support for public ownership of train-operating companies. A poll of 1,500 adults in Britain in June 2018 showed 64% support renationalising Britain's railways, 19% would oppose renationalisation and 17% did not know.

== See also ==
- Financing of the rail industry in Great Britain
- Impact of the privatisation of British Rail
- Renationalisation of British Rail
- Rail transport in Great Britain
- Great British Railways
