= Herbert Witzenmann =

Herbert Witzenmann (16 February 1905, Pforzheim, Baden – 24 September 1988, Heidelberg, Baden-Württemberg) was a German philosopher and anthroposophist.

== Career ==
Witzenmann received his decisive study and work impulses through personal conversations with Rudolf Steiner. In the 1930s Witzenmann studied with Karl Jaspers in Heidelberg. His thesis On the Concept of Work According to Nietzsche and Hegel could, however, no longer be accepted because of Jaspers' forced exile under the National Socialists. Evidence for Jasper's acceptance of Witzenmann's promotion candidacy has not been presented. According to Witzenmann his dissertation manuscript was destroyed by fire due to the phosphorus bombings of Pforzheim by U.S. airplanes in World War II.

After studies in mechanical engineering, Witzenmann was employed by the family firm in Pforzheim for many years.

In 1963 Witzenmann was "co-opted" as a member by the Executive Committee of the General Anthroposophical Society. Several years later Witzenmann was suspended because he refused to accept a new policy advocated by the majority i.e. all other members of this Committee regarding the Rudolf Steiner Nachlassverwaltung. His door key literally no longer fit the lock to his office as member of the Executive Committee of the Anthroposophical Society. Presumably by order of his four other colleagues, after he walked out of an annual General Assembly meeting of the Anthroposophical Society in protest. At this meeting Witzenmann did not sit in front with his Executive Committee colleagues, but at the rear of the auditorium. In 1973 he founded the "Seminar for the free Striving of Youth, Art and Social Order" in Dornach, Switzerland.

His work has been published by the Gideon Spicker Verlag, Verlag Freies Geistesleben, and Rudolf Steiner Press. Very little has been translated into English because those persons in control of the copyrights discouraged translation (note above reference to U.S. airplanes by one of these persons) and refused to allow translation published. His work is believed by some to be among the most significant in furthering Rudolf Steiner's work in The Philosophy of Freedom.
