= Potters Bar rail accidents =

Derailments in Potters Bar in the United Kingdom

There have been four railway accidents at Potters Bar in England. Those in 1898 and 1946 were signals passed at danger. The accident in 2002 led to substantial public debate and a national change in policy relating to maintenance of infrastructure.

== 1898 ==
On 19 March 1898, the 7:50 p.m train from Hatfield to King's Cross ran past the signals at danger when it reached Potters Bar. The train cut through the catch points and buffers and crashed onto the platform. The front part of the engine was smashed and the leading coach wrecked. No one was killed. The driver, fireman and guard narrowly escaped injury. Some passengers complained of being shaken but were able to go home.

== 1899 ==
On 16 May 1899, the Earl of Strafford was killed at Potters Bar railway station when he was hit by an express train. Witnesses said that he appeared to step in front of the train from the bottom of the slope at the end of the platform; he was carried for 50 yards (46 m). The coroner's court investigated his medical conditions, as he was prone to catalepsy. The possibility of suicide was also considered. A finding of suicide would have had substantial social and legal implications. The jury returned a verdict that the death was due to misadventure.

== 1946 ==
On 10 February 1946, a local passenger train travelling towards King's Cross hit buffers at Potters Bar station. Derailed carriages fouled the main lines. Two express trains travelling in opposite directions then hit the wreckage. Two passengers were killed and 17 injured were taken to hospital. The driver of the local train was found to have misidentified a poorly placed main-line signal as applying to his own line. It was thought probable that he had been misled by the signal applying to his line showing clear when he first saw it (though changing against him shortly afterwards). The signalman was found to have contributed to the accident by changing a set of points as the train passed over them. (Note: Unlike road signals, a rail signal, once observed showing a proceed aspect, will not normally change against the driver observing it.)

== 2002 ==
2002 Potters Bar rail crash

Details
- Date: 10 May 2002; 12:58 BST
- Location: Potters Bar, Hertfordshire
- Coordinates: 51.697°N 0.194°W
- Country: England
- Line: East Coast Main Line
- Operator: West Anglia Great Northern
- Incident type: Derailment
- Cause: Points failure (moved while train was passing over them)

Statistics
- Trains: 1
- Passengers: 151
- Deaths: 7
- Injured: 76

On 10 May 2002, a northbound train derailed at high speed, killing seven and injuring 76. Part of the train ended up wedged between the station platforms and building structures.

=== Event ===
A West Anglia Great Northern train service left King's Cross station at 12:45 heading for King's Lynn in Norfolk, via Cambridge. At 12:55, travelling at 97 mph (156 km/h), the four-coach Class 365 Electric multiple unit (unit number: 365526) passed over a set of points "2182A" just south of Potters Bar station. The points moved under the train, causing the rear bogie of the third coach and the entire fourth carriage to derail. This caused the fourth coach to become detached and cross onto the adjacent line where it flipped into the air.

The momentum threw the carriage into the station, where one end of the carriage struck Darkes Lane bridge parapet, destroying the masonry and sending debris onto the road below. It then mounted the platform and slid along before coming to rest under the platform canopy at 45 degrees. The front three coaches remained on the tracks and came to a stop approximately 400 m (1,300 ft) north of the station due to an automatic application of the brakes.

Six passengers travelling on board the train were killed, including the broadcaster Austen Kark (whose wife Nina Bawden was seriously injured) and the philosopher Jonael Schickler. A seventh person, Agnes Quinlivan, was killed by the masonry falling from the bridge over Darkes Lane.

=== Investigation ===
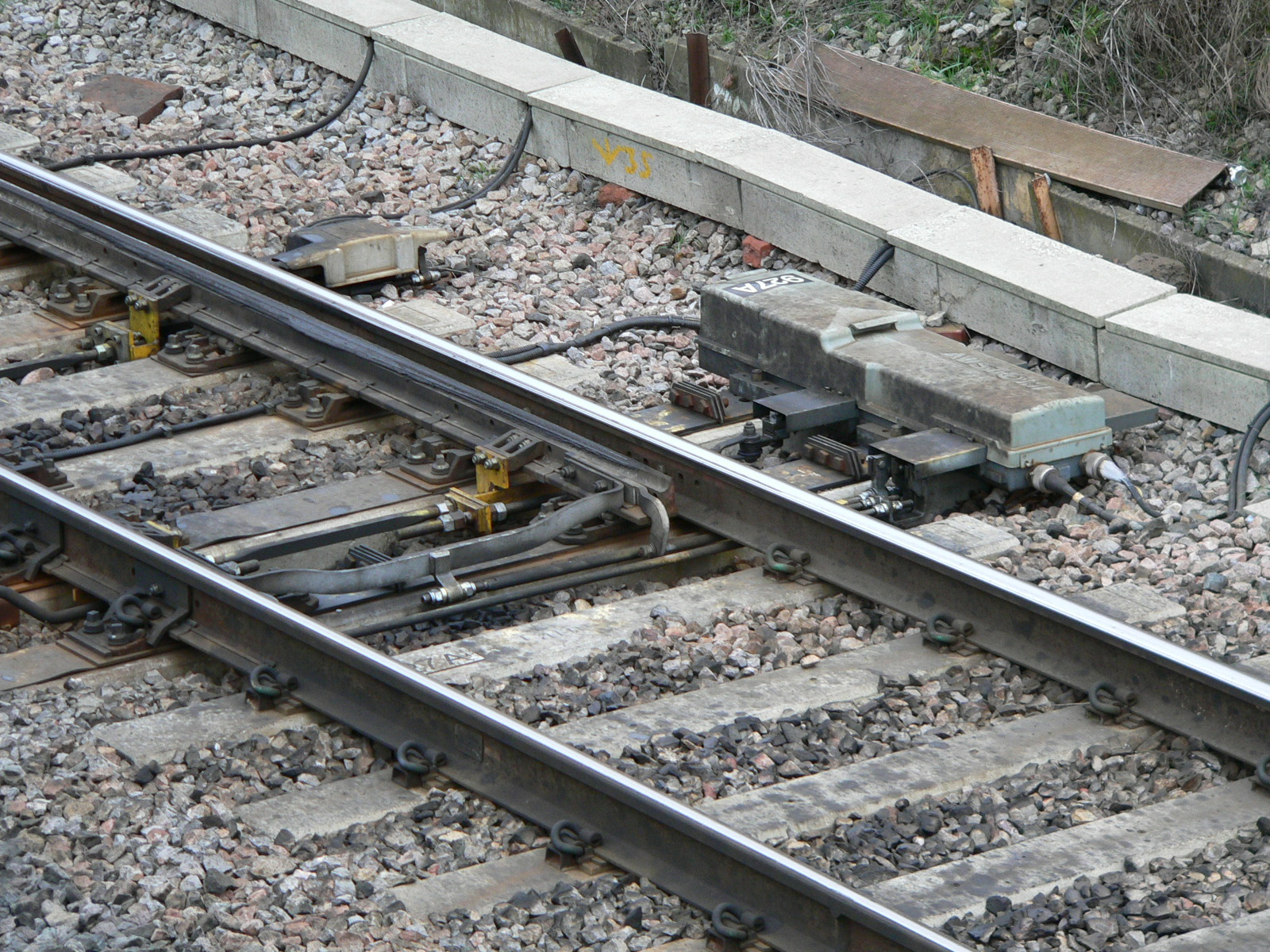
A set of points. The stretcher bars positioned between the two moving blades keep them the correct distance apart

The Health and Safety Executive (HSE) report released in May 2003 found that the points were poorly maintained and that this was the principal cause of the accident. The bolts that held the stretcher bars that maintain the distance between the two point blades had come loose or gone missing, causing the point blades to move apart when the train passed over them. The points had been fully inspected on 1 May by a team working for the private railway maintenance firm Jarvis plc and there had been a further visual inspection on 9 May the day before the crash, with no problems reported.

However, that evening, a West Anglia Great Northern station announcer was travelling on the down fast line and reported a "rough ride" at Potters Bar whilst going over that same place on the track, points "2182A". A Railtrack engineering supervisor was sent to make an inspection, but due to an apparent misunderstanding by the King's Cross signal box staff, he was sent to the wrong line, the up fast line, to check the track and points and did not find the "loose nuts" that subsequently led to the accident.

Initially after the accident, Jarvis claimed that the points' poor condition was due to sabotage of some sort, and that its maintenance was not to blame. No solid evidence of any sabotage has ever come to light, and the HSE report found that other sets of points in the Potters Bar area showed similar, less-serious maintenance deficiencies and the poor state of maintenance "probably arose from a failure to understand fully the design and safety requirements".

Further investigations by the HSE found that heavy and constant vibrations on the stretcher bars and their bolts caused them in turn to vibrate and oscillate until their nuts fell off the bolts. These have since been replaced by two-part locking nuts instead of the main nuts having half-size locking nuts to hold them in place.

In November 2010, the Office of Rail Regulation said Network Rail and Jarvis Rail would be charged under the Health and Safety at Work Act. The case was heard at Watford Magistrates' Court in February 2011.

=== Aftermath ===
The tragedy sparked a debate about whether private maintenance firms were paying too little attention to training and safety. In 2003, Network Rail announced it was taking all track maintenance in-house, ending the use of private contractors except for large-scale renewal or development projects.

On 28 April 2004, Jarvis sent a letter to the victims' families, admitting liability for the accident. The company said that it would formally accept "legally justified claims" after making a financial provision of £3,000,000.

In the letter Kevin Hyde, chief executive, wrote:

In the aftermath of the crash, when Jarvis was under great pressure to explain itself, we were drawn into a debate about the possible causes of the crash. On behalf of the company and my colleagues, I would like to apologise for the hurt and anger our actions in responding caused.

A circular memorial plate was erected on platform 3 of the station, dedicated to the seven fatalities of the Potters Bar crash.

On 13 May 2011, Network Rail was fined £3 million for safety failings related to the crash.

=== List of people killed ===
Except for Agnes Quinlivan, a nearby pedestrian, all other fatalities were in the rear carriage of the train.

- Austen Kark, 75 (husband of writer Nina Bawden, who was injured during the accident)
- Emma Knights, 29
- Chia-hsin Lin, 29
- Prince Alexander Ogunwusi, 42
- Agnes Quinlivan, 80 (killed by falling masonry)
- Jonael Schickler, 25
- Chia-Ching Wu, 30

== See also ==
- List of rail accidents in the United Kingdom
- Brétigny-sur-Orge train crash – a 2013 accident in France with similar circumstances to the 2002 Potters Bar crash
