= Rail subsidies =

Monetary support for railways

Many countries offer subsidies to their railways because of the social and economic benefits that it brings. The economic benefits can greatly assist in funding the rail network. Those countries usually also fund or subsidize road construction, and therefore effectively also subsidize road transport. Rail subsidies vary in both size and how they are distributed, with some countries funding the infrastructure and others funding trains and their operators, while others have a mixture of both. Subsidies can be used for either investment in upgrades and new lines, or to keep lines running that create economic growth.

Rail subsidies are largest in China ($130 billion), Europe (€73 billion) and India ($35.8 billion), while the United States has relatively small subsidies for passenger rail with freight not subsidized.

== Social and economic benefits of rail ==
Railways channel growth toward dense city agglomerations and along their arteries. These arrangements help to regenerate cities, increase revenue from local taxes, boost housing values, and encourage mixed use development. By contrast, a policy of highway expansion, which is more typical in the U.S., promotes the development of suburbs at the periphery, contributing to increased vehicle miles traveled, carbon emissions, development of greenfield spaces, and depletion of natural reserves.

== Modern rail as economic development indicator ==
European development economists have argued that the existence of modern rail infrastructure is a significant indicator of a country's economic advancement: this perspective is illustrated notably through the Basic Rail Transportation Infrastructure Index (known as BRTI Index).

== Subsidies by country ==
=== Europe ===
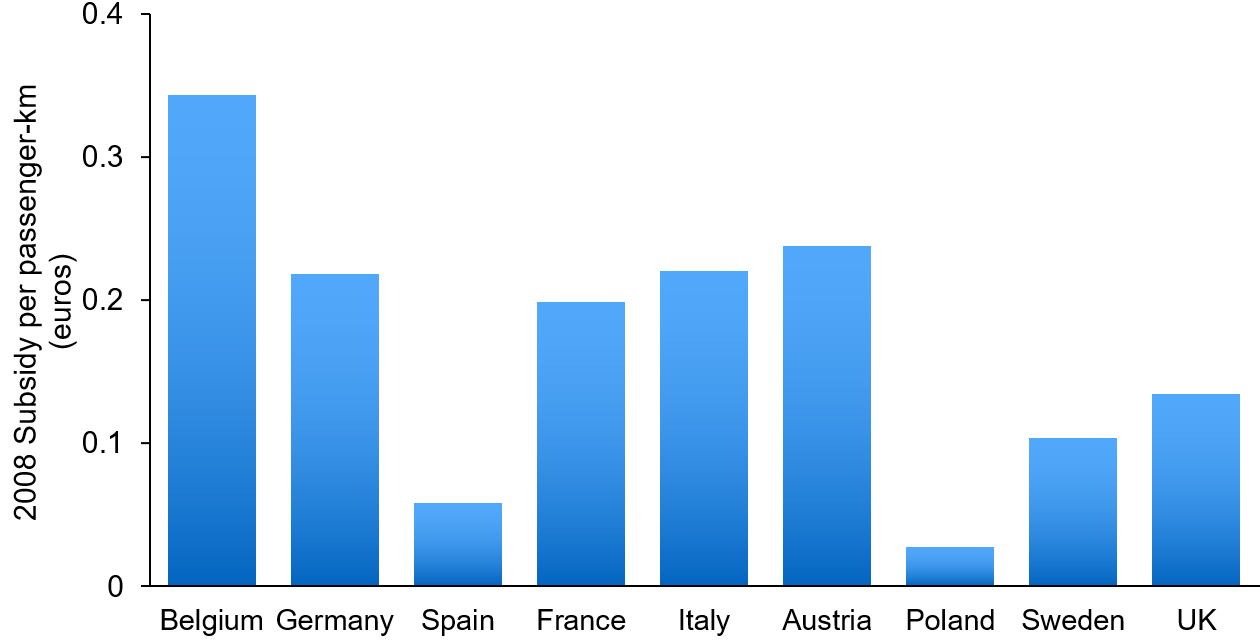
European rail subsidies in euros per passenger-km for 2008

Total EU rail subsidies amounted to €73 billion in 2005.

Country	Subsidy in billions of Euros	Year	Billion passenger-km travelled in 2014
Germany	17.0	2014	79.3
France	13.2	2013	83.9
Italy	7.6	2012	39.7
Switzerland	5.8	2012	18.4
Spain	5.1	2015	24.5
United Kingdom	9.2	2016	65.1
Belgium	2.8	2012	10.8
Netherlands	2.5	2014	17
Austria	3.7	2021	11.4
Denmark	1.7	2008	5.8
Sweden	1.6	2009	6.1
Poland	1.4	2008	11.9
Ireland	0.91	2008	1.7

Note that several operators that do not receive subsidies also exist, including virtually all long-haul and high-speed services in France and Germany.

=== China ===
In 2015, total domestic rail spending by China was $128 billion and was likely to remain at a similar rate for the rest of the country's next Five Year Period (2016-2020). A planned 8,000 kilometres (about 5,000 miles) of track will be added domestically, with a goal of better connecting existing domestic track with other foreign railway systems.

=== India ===
The Indian railways are subsidised by around Rs 0.6 trillion ($6 billion), of which around 43% goes to commuter rail and short-haul trips.

=== United States ===
Current subsidies for Amtrak (passenger rail) are around $1.4 billion. The rail freight industry does not receive direct subsidies.

=== Russia ===
In total, Russian Railways receives 112 billion rubles (around US$1.5 billion) annually from the government.

=== Japan ===
The privatized rail network in Japan requires few subsidies. The three biggest companies, JR East, JR Central and JR-West (which account for 60% of the passenger market) receive no state subsidy.

== See also ==
- Rail transport
- Rail transport by country
- Subsidy
- Financing of the rail industry in Great Britain
