= Kettering railway station =

Railway station in Northamptonshire, England

Kettering
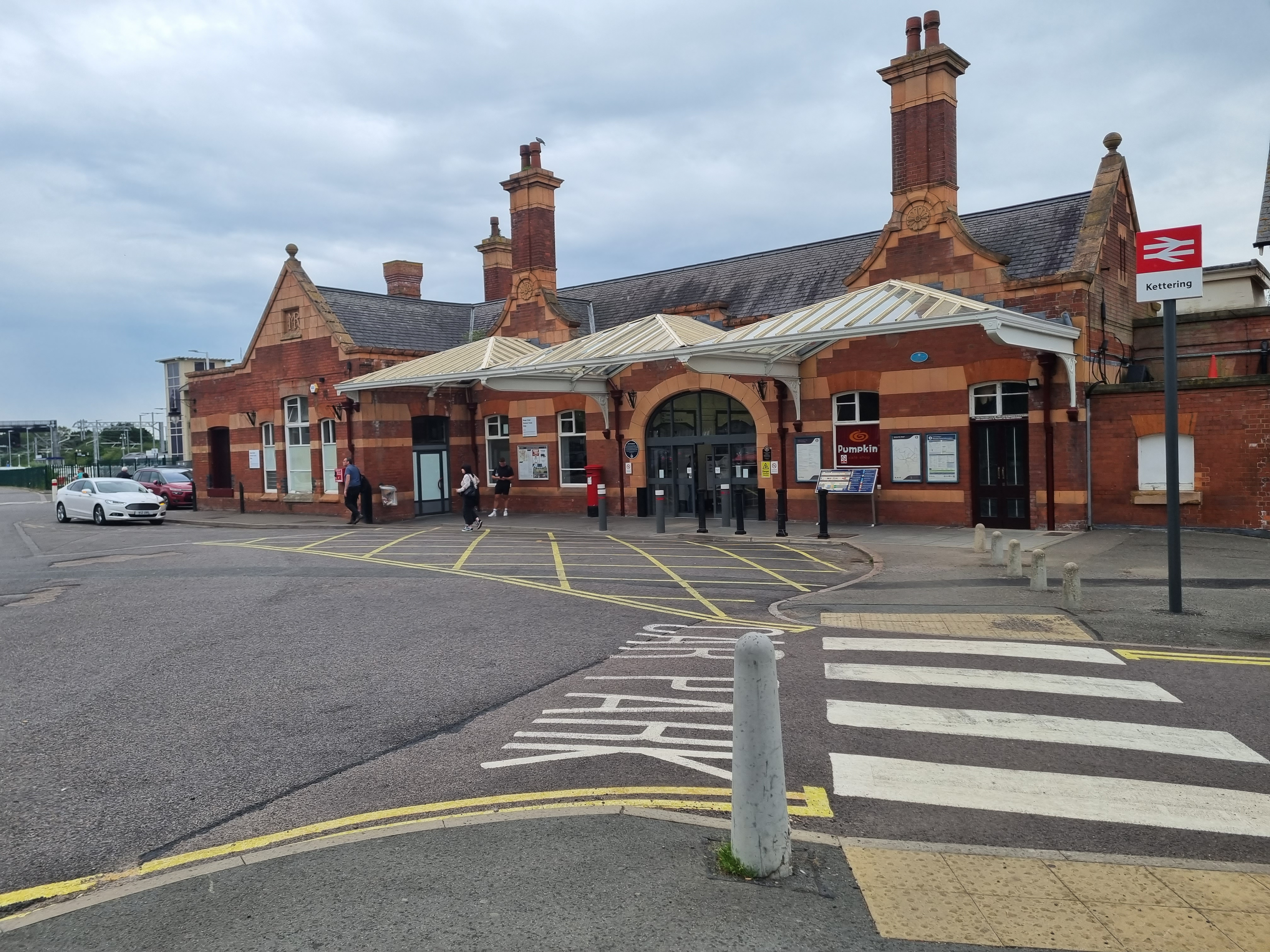
- A view of the station frontage from Station Road, 2023

General information
- Location: Kettering, North Northamptonshire, England
- Coordinates: 52.39307°N 0.73215°W
- Grid reference: SP863780
- Manager: East Midlands Railway
- Platforms: 4

Other information
- Station code: KET
- Classification: DfT category C2

History
- Original company: Midland Railway
- Pre-grouping: Midland Railway
- Post-grouping: London, Midland and Scottish Railway

Key dates
- 8 May 1857: Opened as Kettering
- 4 May 1970: Renamed Kettering for Corby
- 5 May 1975: Renamed Kettering and Corby
- 2 May 1977: Renamed Kettering for Corby
- 16 May 1988: Renamed Kettering

Passengers
- 2020/21: ▼0.258 million
- Interchange: ▼22,406
- 2021/22: ▲1.113 million
- Interchange: ▲99,783
- 2022/23: ▼1.008 million
- Interchange: ▲0.369 million
- 2023/24: ▲1.063 million
- Interchange: ▲0.394 million
- 2024/25: ▲1.137 million
- Interchange: ▲0.432 million

Listed Building – Grade II
- Feature: Kettering Railway Station, including the main building and platforms 1,2,3 and 4 and their associated buildings and canopies
- Designated: 5 May 1981 (amended 26 November 2014)
- Reference no.: 1372596
Location
Notes
- Passenger statistics from the Office of Rail and Road

Kettering railway station serves the market and industrial town of Kettering, in Northamptonshire, England. It lies south-west of the town centre, on the Midland Main Line, 71 miles (115 km) north of London St. Pancras.

== History ==
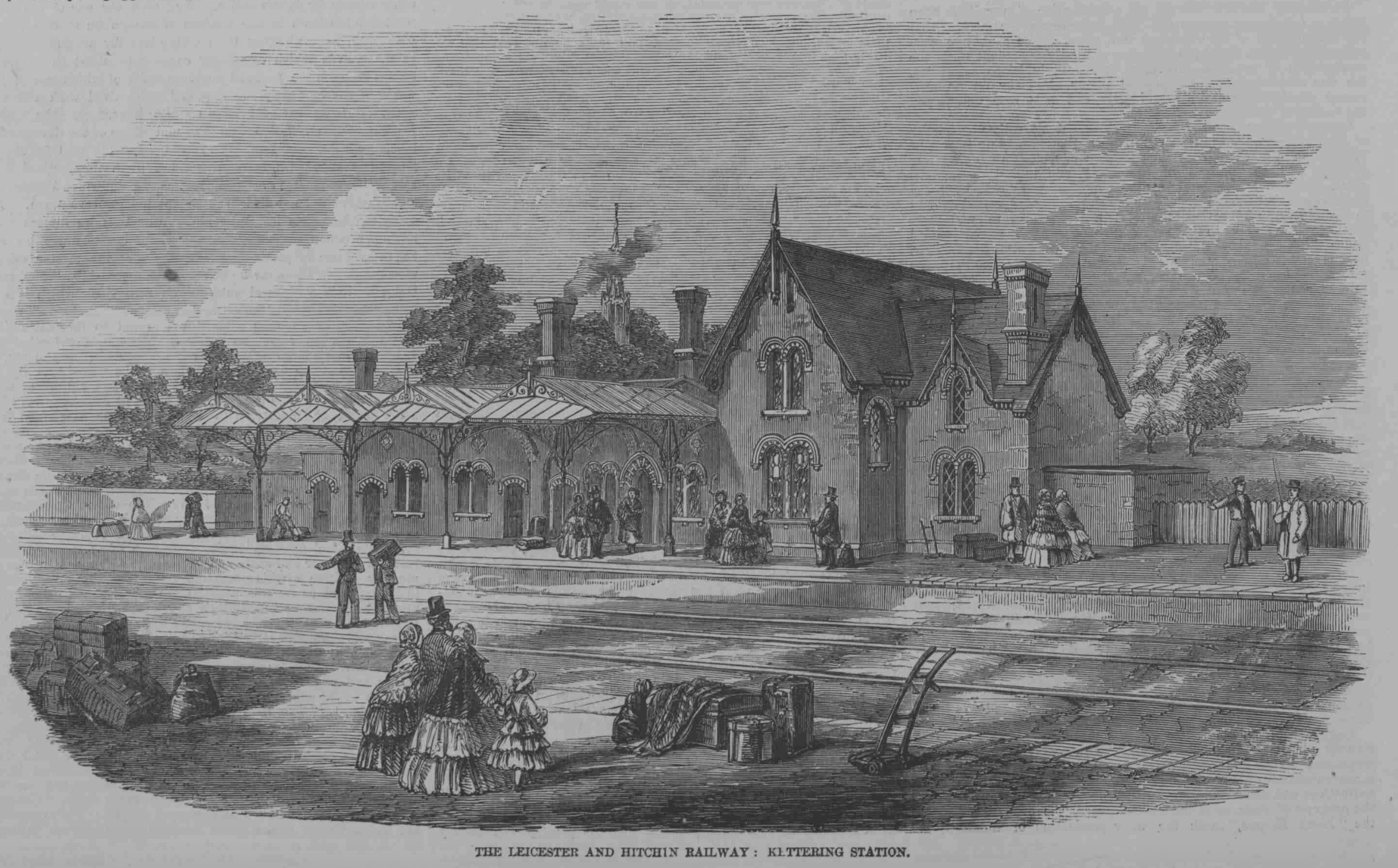
Kettering station from The Illustrated London News 23 May 1857

The station was opened in May 1857 by the Midland Railway, on a line linking the Midland to the Great Northern Railway at Hitchin. Later, the Midland gained its own London terminus at London St Pancras. In 1857, the leather trade was in recession and so over half of Kettering's population was on poor relief; the railway enabled the town to sell its products over a much wider area and restored it to prosperity.

The original station with a single platform was designed by Charles Henry Driver, with particularly fine 'pierced grill' cast ironwork on the platform. In 1858, it was reported that the station was now lit by gas lamps with gas supplied from the town mains. It was also reported that the line was one of the very few without telegraphic wires.

From 1866, the station was also the terminus of the Midland cross-country branch line from Cambridge via St Ives and Huntingdon, until closure in June 1959.

In 1879, the line was quadrupled. New fast lines were built to the west of the original slow lines. Three new platforms were built: numbers 2 and 3 on an island between the fast and slow lines, with number 4 to the west of the fast lines. The Midland Railway commissioned single-storey weather-boarded waiting rooms and canopies, with cast-iron columns and spandrels for the island platforms 2 and 3 and platform 4, to match those designed in 1857 by Charles Henry Driver.

From 1879 (for freight) and 1880 (for passengers), Kettering was also a junction for the direct line to Nottingham, via Oakham and Melton Mowbray. This closed to passengers in 1966, but was left as a through route for freight (as far as Melton Mowbray only from 1968).

Other additions included a two-bay engine shed, erected by C. Deacon & Company for the Midland Railway, at the north end of the forecourt around 1875 and a goods shed with offices, built at the south end in around 1894.

The Midland Railway replaced the main station buildings on platform 1 between 1895 and 1898 with a new booking hall, booking office, parcels office and refreshment room. These current buildings may be by Charles Trubshaw. It is regarded as one of the best remaining examples of Midland architecture.

In the 1970s, the glass canopies became a maintenance headache for British Rail, who proposed to remove the tops of the cast iron columns and replace the glass canopies with plastic sheeting. Kettering Civic Society objected to the plans and the canopies and columns were reprieved, later to be sympathetically restored by Railtrack in 2000.

=== London, Midland and Scottish Railway ===
Until the line through Bakewell was closed in the Beeching era, the 'main lines' were those from London to Manchester, carrying named expresses such as The Palatine. Express trains to Leeds and Scotland, such as the Thames–Clyde Express, generally used the Erewash Valley line then on to the Settle–Carlisle line. Expresses to Edinburgh, such as The Waverley, travelled through Corby and Nottingham.

=== Corby services ===
Just north of Kettering, on Engineer's Line Reference SPC2 (St Pancras to Chesterfield), is Glendon Junction for the Oakham–Kettering line. This leads through Corby to Manton Junction, where it joins the Leicester–Peterborough line. This historically provided an alternative route for expresses to Nottingham via Old Dalby.

Passenger services were withdrawn from this line in the 1960s, though it remained open for freight. In 1987, Network SouthEast experimentally introduced a shuttle service between Kettering and a new station in the nearby town of Corby. The service was withdrawn a few years later. Corby was often regarded as being the largest town in western Europe with no railway station. East Midlands Trains, and Midland Mainline before it, was committed through its franchise to run a shuttle bus from Corby to Kettering station. Occasionally the line is used as a diversionary route when the route between Kettering and Leicester is closed.

The new station at Corby was originally planned to open in December 2008, but this was delayed until extra trains were acquired. It eventually opened on 23 February 2009, initially served by one return train to London St Pancras per day, operated by East Midlands Trains. Full service, with 13 daily returns to London, started on 27 April 2009. The service provided hourly trains between Corby and London St Pancras International until the May 2021 timetable change when the service was increased to half-hourly under the new franchise holder Abellio.

== Facilities ==
Kettering is staffed during operational hours (05:00-00:30); it is locked and inaccessible outside of these times. The station is equipped with CCTV cameras, which are monitored locally and at the town council offices. It has the following facilities:

- Lifts to all platforms.
- Two pay and display car parks
- Waiting rooms on all platforms
- Café.
- Accessible toilet and baby change.
- Ticket machine
- Food vending machines.
- Payphones.

Through fares were made available from 68 UK towns and cities to Paris, Brussels and other destinations in France and Belgium in late 2007. These must be booked through Eurostar.

A subway and barrow crossing was used at the station to access the various platforms, until the lifts and stairs were constructed in the 1990s. The former station master's flat has remained available to rent for several years.

== Services ==
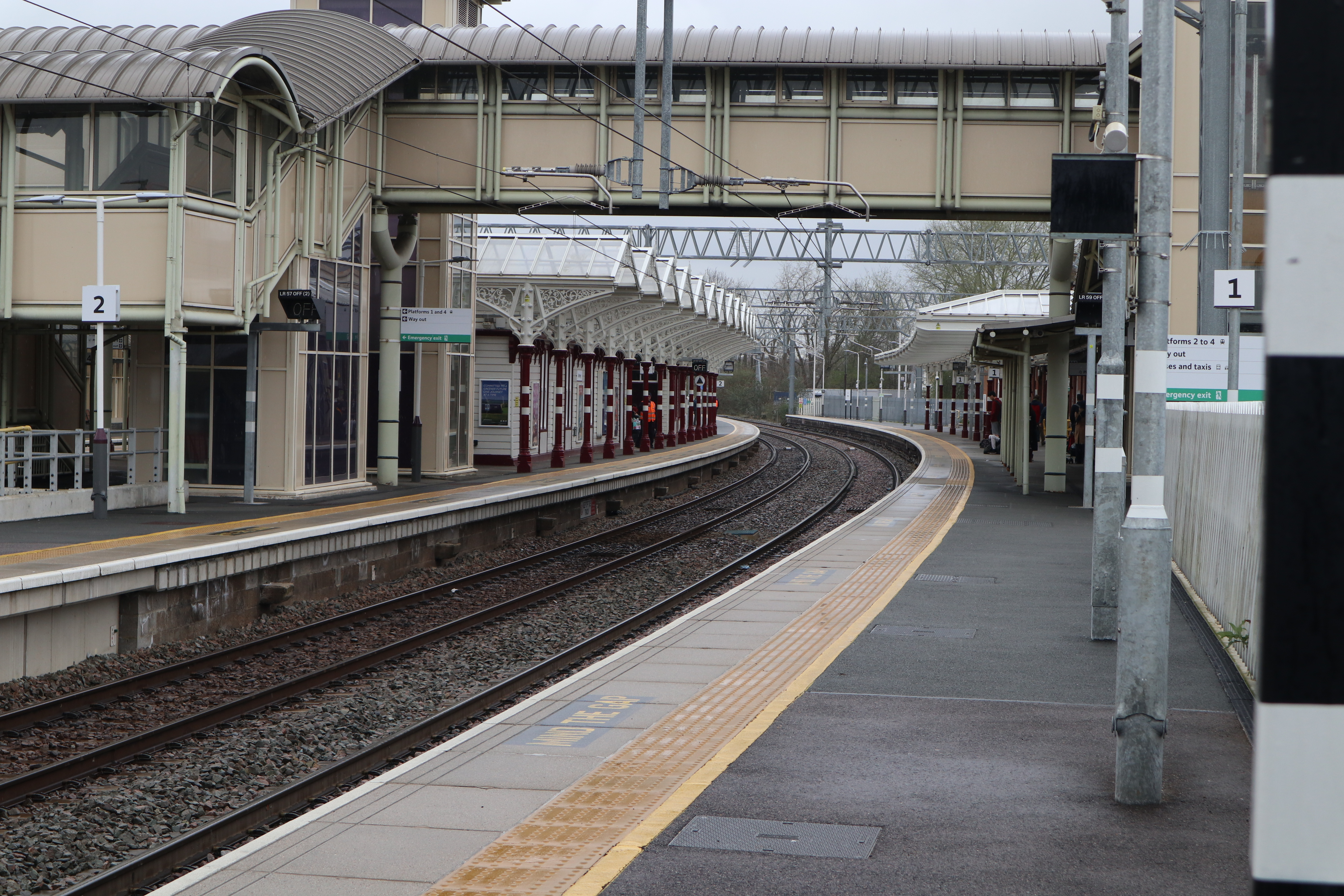
Platforms 1 and 2 at Kettering station where the EMR Connect services between Corby & London St Pancras depart

All services at Kettering are operated by East Midlands Railway under its InterCity and Connect brands.

Services are operated using Class 222 Meridian diesel multiple units for InterCity services and Class 360 electric multiple units for Connect services.

The typical off-peak service in trains per hour is:

- 4 tph to London St Pancras; of which:
  - 2 of these are non-stop InterCity services and 2 are Connect services calling at Wellingborough, Bedford, Luton and Luton Airport Parkway)
- 2 tph to Corby
- 2 tph to Nottingham, via Leicester.

There is also a limited service to Sheffield, although most Sheffield-bound trains pass through the station without stopping.

There are also two trains per day that continue past Corby to and from Oakham and Melton Mowbray. One of these terminates at Kettering and the other continues to London St Pancras.

Preceding station	National Rail	Following station
Market Harborough	East Midlands Railway Midland Main Line	London St Pancras International
Corby	East Midlands Railway London to Corby Connect	Wellingborough
	Disused railways	
Glendon and Rushton	Midland Railway Midland Main Line	Isham and Burton Latimer

== Future ==
It was originally planned that all platforms would be extended by up to 50 metres by 2012, to allow longer trains to be accommodated. This was not completed until years later, as the platforms were extended by August 2020 in preparation for the May 2021 timetable change. This is because 21 new 4-carriage Class 360 EMU units are occasionally used in formations of threes, equivalent to 12 carriages per train, and require the extra platform length to fit fully.

Until very recently, the railway through Kettering was not electrified, this changed in May 2021, when Class 360 EMUs began running on the newly electrified section between Bedford and Corby, along its route between London St Pancras and Corby. Diesel Class 222 Meridians and 180 Adelantes were cascaded in order to solely run the inter-city services north to Nottingham, Sheffield, Derby, Leeds and Lincoln; these services continue to call frequently at Kettering. The Class 180s were removed from service in May 2023, and direct trains to Lincoln and Leeds no longer serve Kettering.

Kettering is also now a major interchange for the south end of the Midland Main Line. In the May 2021 timetable change, the EMR inter-city services stopped calling at Wellingborough, Bedford, Luton and Luton Airport Parkway. Passengers from these stations now have to change at Kettering in order to take an EMR inter-city train north to destinations such as Leicester, Nottingham and Derby.

== Destinations ==
=== Major urban centres ===
Many of the UK's major cities can be reached with one or two changes. Many continental cities can be reached via one change at St Pancras International.

The following places can be reached directly from Kettering (Journey times approximate):

- London (St Pancras International] - 45–65 minutes
- Leicester- 23–26 mins
- Derby - 55 mins
- Nottingham - 55 mins
- Sheffield - 1 hour 25 mins
- Luton - 40 mins

The following places can be reached from Kettering by changing once:

- Stoke-on-Trent, Crewe - Change at Derby
- Edinburgh, Newcastle, York, Leeds, Bristol, Plymouth - Change at Sheffield or Derby
- Manchester, Liverpool - Change at Nottingham
- Birmingham, Cambridge - Change at Leicester
- St Albans - Change at Luton or Luton Airport Parkway

Passengers are able to travel to Paris and Brussels by changing at St Pancras International. East Midlands Railway has said it will introduce earlier journeys to London to allow passengers to arrive in Paris or Brussels before 9am.

=== Local centres ===
The following places can be reached directly from Kettering (Journey times approximate):

- Bedford - 20 mins
- Corby - 8 mins
- Loughborough - 36 mins
- Market Harborough - 10 mins
- Wellingborough - 8 mins

The following places can be reached from Kettering by changing once:

- Norwich - Change at Nottingham
- Huddersfield, Rotherham, Hull, Grimsby - Change at Sheffield
- Grantham, Skegness, Boston, Lincoln - Change at Nottingham
- Mansfield - Change at Nottingham
- Worksop - Change at Nottingham.

== See also ==
- Midland Main Line railway upgrade
