= Ashwell railway station =

Former railway station in Rutland, England

Coordinates: 52.7155°N 0.7269°W

Ashwell
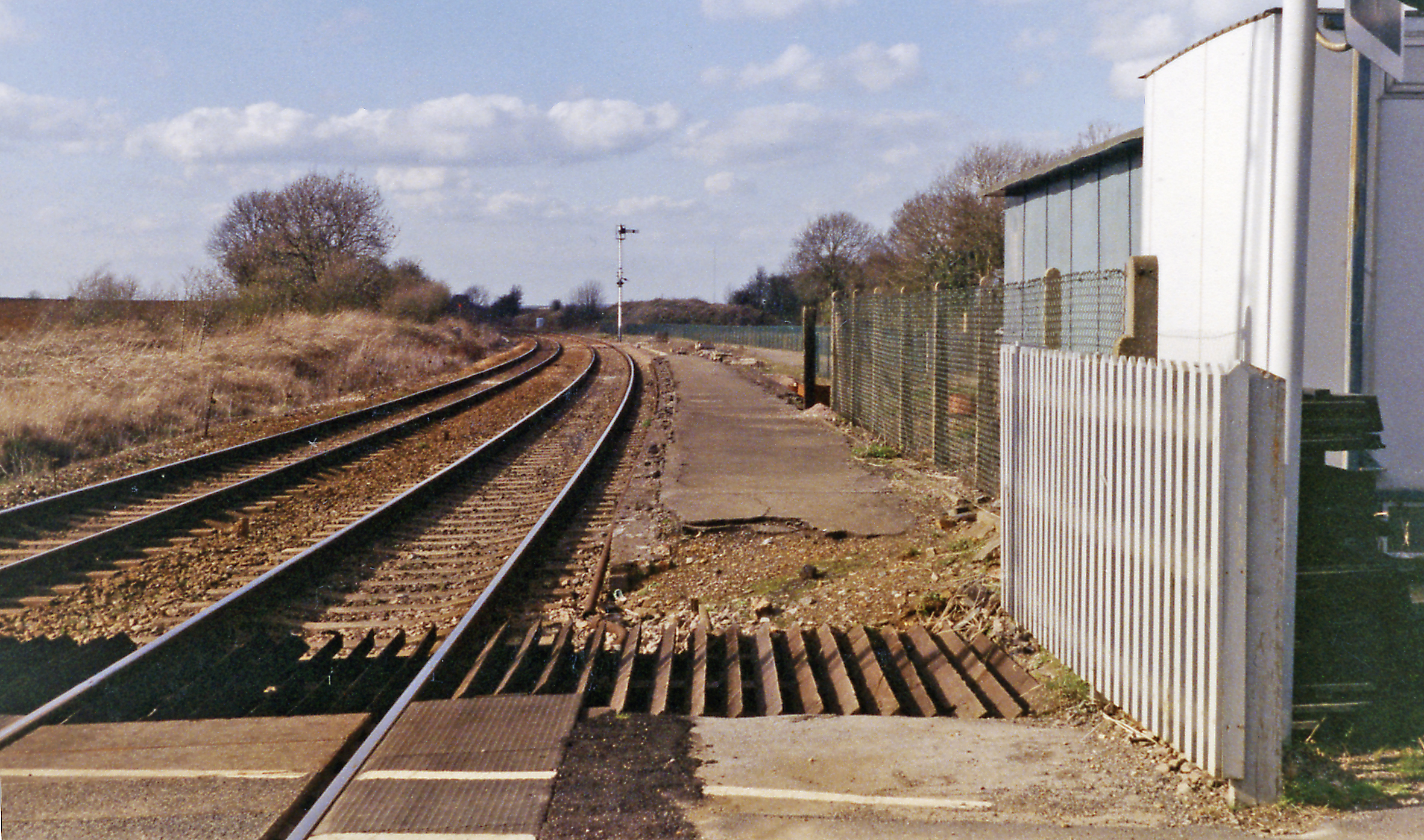
- Location of Ashwell station (1994)

General information
- Location: Ashwell, Rutland; England
- Grid reference: SK863136
- Platforms: 2

Other information
- Status: Disused

History
- Pre-grouping: Midland Railway
- Post-grouping: London, Midland and Scottish Railway; London Midland Region of British Railways

Key dates
- 1 May 1848: Opened
- 6 June 1966: Closed
Location

The location of Ashwell Station, which served the village of Ashwell from 1848 to 1966.

Ashwell railway station was a station in Ashwell, Rutland on the line between Melton Mowbray and Oakham. It lies west of the village, on the road to Whissendine. Just north of Ashwell was Ashwell Junction where the Cottesmore Ironstone Branch joined. This was in use between 1883 and 1974 and served quarries in the vicinity of Cottesmore and Exton. Part of the former mineral branch line is now Rutland Railway Museum (trading as Rocks by Rail: The Living Ironstone Museum).

== History ==
Opened by the Midland Railway as the Syston and Peterborough Railway in 1848, it became part of the London, Midland and Scottish Railway during the Grouping of 1923. The station then passed on to the London Midland Region of British Railways on nationalisation in 1948.

In 1966 it was closed by the British Railways Board.

== The site today ==
Trains still pass the former station between Melton Mowbray and Oakham stations on the Birmingham to Peterborough Line.

The site now houses some industrial units, called Station Court.

Preceding station	Historical railways	Following station
Whissendine	Midland Railway; Leicester to Peterborough; Nottingham to Kettering	Oakham
