= Geddington railway station =

Disused railway station in Northamptonshire, England

Geddington
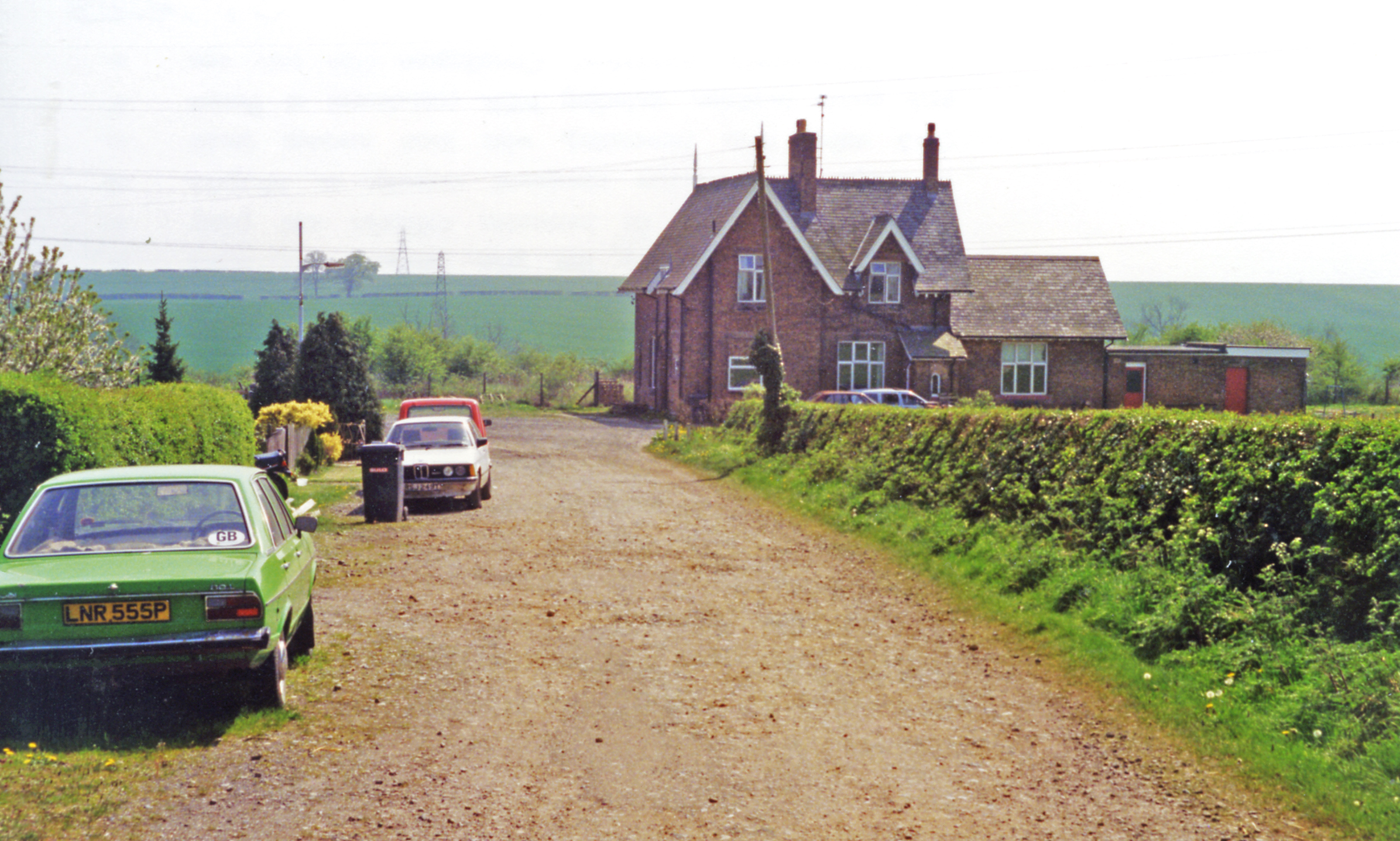
- The site of the station, looking south towards the level crossing, in 1995

General information
- Location: Geddington, Northamptonshire; England
- Coordinates: 52.4578°N 0.7129°W
- Grid reference: SP875851
- Platforms: 2

Other information
- Status: Disused

History
- Original company: Midland Railway
- Pre-grouping: Midland Railway
- Post-grouping: London, Midland and Scottish Railway; British Railways (London Midland Region)

Key dates
- 1 March 1880: Opened
- 1 November 1948: Closed
Location

Geddington railway station served the village of Geddington, Northamptonshire, England, from 1880 to 1948 on the Oakham-Kettering line.

== History ==
The station was opened on 1 March 1880 by the Midland Railway. It closed on 1 November 1948. The station building survives as a private residence.

Preceding station	Disused railways	Following station
Corby; Line and station open	North British Railway; Oakham-Kettering line	Kettering; Line and station open
