= List of railway lines in Great Britain =

Map of the rail infrastructure of Great Britain, including the speed, use, electrification and number of tracks on its railway lines.

This is a list of railway lines in Great Britain that are currently in operation, split by country, with England also split by region.

There are a limited number of main inter-regional lines, with all but one entering Greater London. The line from London to the Channel Tunnel is the only line designated 'high speed', although the other main routes also operate limited-stop express services.

The bulk of the secondary network is concentrated in London and the surrounding East and South East regions; an area marketed by National Rail as London and the South East. The majority of these lines are radial to London. There is a further concentration of routes around Birmingham in the West Midlands and in the urbanised part of northern England that stretches from Liverpool in the west, via Greater Manchester to Leeds in the east.

Some areas, such as Wales and Scotland, have relatively sparse railway provision. There are local lines throughout all areas of Great Britain with some services designated as community railways.

== England ==
Railway lines in England and Wales, as of 2010

=== London ===
Most main UK routes terminate in London and there is an extensive suburban network

This is a list of routes entirely contained within Greater London.

Name	Route, or previous name	Opened	Regions	Electrified
Acton–Northolt line	formerly "New North Main Line"	1903	London	—
Bromley North Line	Grove Park to Bromley North	1878	London	Third rail, 750 V DC
Catford Loop Line	Brixton to Shortlands	1892	London	Third rail, 750 V DC
Chessington branch line	Motspur Park to Chessington South	1938–1939	London	Third rail, 750 V DC
Chingford branch line	Clapton to Chingford	1873	London	OHLE, 25 kV 50 Hz AC
Crystal Palace line	Balham Junction to Beckenham Junction	1856–1858	London	Third rail, 750 V DC
Dudding Hill line	Acton Main Line to Cricklewood	1875	London	—
East London line	Highbury & Islington to West Croydon	1869–2010	London	Third rail, 750 V DC
Gospel Oak to Barking line		1894–1868	London	OHLE, 25 kV 50 Hz AC (partial)
Greenford branch line	GWML to Greenford	1903	London	—
Greenwich line	North Kent East junction to Charlton Junction	1836	London	Third rail, 750 V DC
Greenwich Park branch line	Nunhead to Lewisham	1929	London	Third rail, 750 V DC
Hayes line	Lewisham to Hayes	1857–1882	London	Third rail, 750 V DC
Holborn Viaduct–Herne Hill line		1863–1866	London	Third rail, 750 V DC
Hounslow Loop line	Barnes Junction to Feltham Junction	1850	London	Third rail, 750 V DC
Kingston loop line	Twickenham to New Malden	1863–1869	London	Third rail, 750 V DC
North London line	Richmond to Stratford	1846–1869	London	OHLE, 25 kV 50 Hz AC; Third rail, 750 V DC
Northern City Line	Moorgate to Finsbury Park	1904	London	OHLE, 25 kV 50 Hz AC; Third rail, 750 V DC
Romford–Upminster line		1893	London	OHLE, 25 kV 50 Hz AC
South London line	Battersea Park to London Bridge	1886	London	Third rail, 750 V DC
Sutton Loop Line	Streatham South Junction to Sutton	1864-1929	London	Third rail, 750 V DC
West London line	Clapham Junction to Willesden Junction	1844	London	OHLE, 25 kV 50 Hz AC; Third rail, 750 V DC

==== Terminus ====
Name	End and major calling points	Countries and regions	Category
Chiltern Main Line	London, High Wycombe, Bicester, Banbury, Leamington Spa, Solihull, Birmingham	England: London, South East, West Midlands	Main Line 100 mph
East Coast Main Line	London, Leeds, York, Newcastle, Edinburgh	England: East, East Midlands, London, North East, Yorkshire and the Humber; Scotland	High Speed Main Line 125 mph
Great Eastern Main Line	London, Ipswich, Norwich	England: East, London	Main Line 100 mph
Great Western Main Line	London, Bristol	England: London, South East, South West	High Speed Main Line 125 mph
High Speed 1	London, Channel Tunnel	England: East, London, South East. Continental Europe: France, Belgium, Netherlands, Germany	High Speed Line 186 mph
Midland Main Line	London, Leicester, Nottingham, Sheffield	England: East, East Midlands, London, Yorkshire and the Humber	High Speed Main Line 125 mph
South West Main Line	London, Southampton, Bournemouth, Weymouth	England: London, South East, South West	Main Line 100 mph
West Coast Main Line	London, Glasgow with spurs to Birmingham, Liverpool, Manchester, Holyhead and Edinburgh	England: London, North West, South East, West Midlands; Scotland; North Wales	High Speed Main Line 125 mph

=== South East England ===
The commuter network stretches from London to the coast and there is a connection to France through the Channel Tunnel

This is a list of all routes that enter the South East England region.

Name	Route, or previous name	Opened	Regions	Electrified
Alton line	Brookwood to Alton	1852	South East	Third rail, 750 V DC
Arun Valley line	Three Bridges to Arundel	1848–1863	South East	Third rail, 750 V DC
Ascot–Ash Vale line		1864–1878	South East	Third rail, 750 V DC
Ashford–Ramsgate line		1846	South East	Third rail, 750 V DC
Aylesbury–Princes Risborough line		1863	South East	—
Bexleyheath line	Lewisham to Dartford	1895	London, South East	Third rail, 750 V DC
Brighton Main Line	London Bridge and London Victoria to Brighton	1839–1941	London, South East	Third rail, 750 V DC
Caterham line	Purley to Caterham	1856	London, South East	Third rail, 750 V DC
Chatham Main Line	London Victoria to Dover Priory and Ramsgate	1858–1926	London, South East	Third rail, 750 V DC
Chertsey branch line	Staines to Weybridge	1849	South East	Third rail, 750 V DC
Cherwell Valley line	Banbury to Didcot Parkway	1844–1873	South East	—
Chiltern Main Line	Marylebone to Birmingham Snow Hill	1852–1910	London, South East, West Midlands	—
Cotswold Line	Oxford to Hereford	1851–1860	South East, South West, West Midlands	—
Darent Valley line	Swanley to Sevenoaks	1862	South East	Third rail, 750 V DC
Dartford Loop Line	Hither Green to Dartford	1866	London, South East	Third rail, 750 V DC
East Coastway line	Brighton/Wivelsfield to Hastings	1846–1871	South East	Third rail, 750 V DC
Eastleigh–Fareham line		1841	South East	Third rail, 750 V DC
Eastleigh–Romsey line		1847	South East	—
East West Rail	Oxford to Bletchley	2024	South East England	Not initially
Elizabeth line	Heathrow Terminal 4, Heathrow Terminal 5 and Reading to Abbey Wood and Shenfield	2022	East, London, South East	25 kV 50 Hz AC
Epsom Downs Branch	Sutton to Epsom Downs	1865	London, South East	Third rail, 750 V DC
Hampton Court branch line	SWML to Hampton Court	1849	South East	Third rail, 750 V DC
Hastings line	Tonbridge to Hastings	1845–1852	South East	Third rail, 750 V DC
Henley branch line	Twyford to Henley-on-Thames	1857	South East	—
High Speed 1	London to Channel Tunnel	2003–2007	London, South East	OHLE, 25 kV 50 Hz AC
Island Line	Ryde Pier Head to Shanklin (Isle of Wight)	1864	South East	Third rail, 750 V DC
Kent Coast line	Minster East Jn to Buckland Jn	1847	South East	Third rail, 750 V DC
Kent Downs line	Otford to Ashford International	1874–1884	South East	Third rail, 750 V DC
London–Aylesbury line		1868 and 1899	London, East	Fourth rail, 750 V DC (partial)
Lymington branch line	SWML to Lymington Pier	1858	South East	Third rail, 750 V DC
Marlow branch line	Maidenhead to Marlow	1854	South East	—
Marshlink line	Ashford International to Hastings	1851	South East	—
Marston Vale line	Bletchley to Bedford	1845	East, South East	—
Medway Valley line	Strood to Paddock Wood	1844–1856	South East	Third rail, 750 V DC
New Guildford line	Surbiton to Guildford	1885	South East	Third rail, 750 V DC
North Downs Line	Reading to Redhill	1849	South East	Third rail, 750 V DC (partial)
North Kent Line	London to Strood	1846–1849	London, South East	Third rail, 750 V DC
Oxford–Bicester line		1850	South East	—
Oxted line	South Croydon to East Grinstead or Uckfield	1858–1888	London, South East	Third rail, 750 V DC (Croydon–East Grinstead)
Portsmouth Direct line	Woking to Portsmouth Harbour	1845–1858	South East	Third rail, 750 V DC
Portsmouth line	Peckham Rye to Horsham	1847–1868	South East	Third rail, 750 V DC
Reading–Basingstoke line		1848	South East	—
Reading–Taunton line		1847–1906	South East, South West	—
Redhill–Tonbridge line		1884	South East	Third rail, 750 V DC
Seaford branch line	Lewes to Seaford	1864	South East	Third rail, 750 V DC
Sheerness line	Sittingbourne to Sheerness-on-Sea	1860	South East	Third rail, 750 V DC
Shepperton branch line	Kingston Loop to Shepperton	1864–1894	London, South East	Third rail, 750 V DC
Slough–Windsor & Eton line		1849	South East	—
South Eastern Main Line	Cannon Street or Charing Cross to Dover Priory	1842–1871	London, South East	Third rail, 750 V DC
Staines–Windsor line		1848–1849	South East	Third rail, 750 V DC
Sutton and Mole Valley lines		1847–1868	London, South East	Third rail, 750 V DC
Tattenham Corner line	Purley to Tattenham Corner	1897–1901	London, South East	Third rail, 750 V DC
Waterloo–Reading line		1846–1856	London, South East	Third rail, 750 V DC
Wessex Main Line	Bristol Temple Meads to Southampton Central	1847–1856	South East, South West	—
West Coastway line	Brighton to Southampton Central	1840–1889	South East	Third rail, 750 V DC
West of England line	Basingstoke to Exeter St Davids	1854–1860	South East, South West	—

=== South West ===
There is a concentration of routes around Bristol and direct connections to Wales, London and other regions

This is a list of all routes that enter the South West England region.

Name	Route, or previous name	Opened	Regions	Electrified
Atlantic Coast Line	Par to Newquay	1874	South West	—
Avocet Line	Exeter to Exmouth	1862	South West	—
Bristol–Exeter line		1841–1842	South West	—
Cornish Main Line	Plymouth to Penzance	1867	South West	—
Cotswold Line	Oxford to Hereford	1851–1860	South East, South West, West Midlands	—
Dartmoor line	Crediton to Okehampton	1851–1871	South West	—
Exeter–Plymouth line		1846–1849	South West	—
Gloucester–Newport line		1850	South West	—
Golden Valley line	Swindon to Cheltenham Spa	1845	South West	—
Heart of Wessex Line	Bristol Temple Meads to Weymouth	1857	South West	—
Looe Valley Line	Liskeard to Looe	1860–1901	South West	—
Maritime Line	Truro to Falmouth Docks	1863	South West	—
Reading–Taunton line		1847–1906	South East, South West	OHLE, 25 kV 50 Hz AC (partial)
Riviera Line	Exeter St Davids to Paignton	1846–1859	South West	—
Severn Beach line	Bristol to Severn Beach	1840–1900	South West	—
South Wales Main Line	Swindon to Swansea	1850–1903	South West, South Wales	—
St Ives Bay Line	St Erth to St Ives	1877	South West	—
Tamar Valley Line	Plymouth to Gunnislake	1890–1908	South West	—
Tarka Line	Exeter to Barnstaple	1851–1854	South West	—
Wessex Main Line	Bristol to Southampton	1847–1856	South East, South West	—
West of England line	SWML to Exeter	1854–1860	South East, South West	—

==== Terminus ====
Name	End and major calling points	Countries and regions	Category
Cross Country Route	Bristol, Birmingham, Sheffield, Leeds, York	England: East Midlands, South West, Yorkshire and the Humber, West Midlands	High Speed Main Line 125 mph
South Wales Main Line	Bristol, Swansea via Cardiff	England: South West; Wales: South	Main Line (100 mph)

=== North West England ===
There is a significant concentration of routes around urbanised Liverpool and Manchester with the northern part of the region less well served

This is a list of all routes that enter the North West England region.

Name	Route, or previous name	Opened	Regions	Electrified
Blackpool branch lines	WCML at Preston to Blackpool North or South	1846–1865	North West	OHLE, 25 kV 50 Hz AC (partial)
Borderlands line	Wrexham Central to Bidston	1887–1896	North West	—
Buxton line	Manchester Piccadilly to Buxton	1863	East Midlands, North West	OHLE, 25 kV 50 Hz AC
Calder Valley line	Blackpool North or Manchester Victoria to Leeds		North West, Yorkshire and the Humber	—
Chester–Birkenhead line		1840	North West	Third rail, 750 V DC
Chester–Warrington line		1850	North West	—
Crewe–Liverpool line			North West	OHLE, 25 kV 50 Hz AC
Crewe–Manchester line		1841	North West	OHLE, 25 kV 50 Hz AC
Cumbrian Coast Line	Carlisle to Barrow-in-Furness	1844–1845	North West	—
East Lancashire line	Preston to Colne	1846–1848	North West	—
Furness line	Barrow-in-Furness to Carnforth	1846–1858	North West	—
Glossop line	Manchester Piccadilly to Glossop or Hadfield	1842–1845	East Midlands, North West	OHLE, 25 kV 50 Hz AC
Hooton–Helsby line		1863	North West	—
Hope Valley Line	Manchester Piccadilly to Sheffield	1894	North West, Yorkshire and the Humber	—
Huddersfield line	Manchester Piccadilly or Victoria to Leeds	1849	North West, Yorkshire and the Humber	Planned
Kirkby branch line	Kirkby to Wigan Wallgate	1848	North West	—
Leeds–Morecambe line		1846–1864	North West, Yorkshire and the Humber	OHLE, 25 kV 50 Hz AC (partial)
Liverpool–Manchester lines		1830 onwards	North West	OHLE, 25 kV 50 Hz AC (partial)
Liverpool–Wigan line		1869–1871	North West	OHLE, 25 kV 50 Hz AC
Manchester–Preston line		1838–1841	North West	OHLE, 25 kV 50 Hz AC
Manchester–Southport line			North West	—
Mid-Cheshire line	Manchester Piccadilly to Chester	1855–1888	North West	—
Morecambe branch line	Lancaster to Morecambe or Heysham Port	1864	North West	—
Ormskirk branch line	Preston to Ormskirk	1848	North West	—
Ribble Valley line	Manchester Victoria to Hellifield	1845–1872	North West	—
Settle–Carlisle line		1875	North West, Yorkshire and the Humber	—
Stafford–Manchester line		1848	North West, West Midlands	OHLE, 25 kV 50 Hz AC
Stockport–Stalybridge line			North West	—
Styal Line	Manchester Piccadilly to Manchester Airport or Wilmslow	1909	North West	OHLE, 25 kV 50 Hz AC
Tyne Valley line	Newcastle to Carlisle	1834–1837	North East, North West	—
Windermere branch line	Oxenholme Lake District to Windermere	1847	North West	Proposed
Wirral line	Chester, West Kirby, Elsemere, and New Brighton to Liverpool		North West	

=== West Midlands ===
There is a concentration of routes around Birmingham and direct connections to London and other regions

This is a list of all routes that enter the West Midlands region.

Name	Route, or previous name	Opened	Regions	Electrified
Birmingham–Peterborough line		1840–1860	East, East Midlands, West Midlands	—
Birmingham to Worcester via Bromsgrove Line		1840–1879	West Midlands	OHLE, 25 kV 50 Hz AC (partial)
Birmingham to Worcester via Kidderminster line		1852–1867	West Midlands	—
Camp Hill line	Birmingham New Street to Kings Norton	1840-1841	West Midlands	—
Chase Line	Birmingham New Street to Rugeley Trent Valley	1837–1859 (partly closed 1965, reopened 1989–1997)	West Midlands	OHLE, 25 kV 50 Hz AC
Chiltern Main Line	Marylebone to Birmingham Snow Hill	1852–1910	London, South East, West Midlands	—
Cotswold Line	Oxford to Hereford	1851–1860	South East, South West, West Midlands	—
Coventry–Leamington line		1851	West Midlands	—
Coventry–Nuneaton line		1850	West Midlands	—
Crewe–Derby line		1848	East Midlands, North West, West Midlands	OHLE, 25 kV 50 Hz AC (partial)
Cross-City Line	Redditch or Bromsgrove to Lichfield Trent Valley	1837–1876	West Midlands	OHLE, 25 kV 50 Hz AC
Cross Country Route	Bristol Temple Meads to York	1948	East Midlands, North East, Scotland, South West, Wales, West Anglia, & West Midlands	—
Leamington–Stratford line		1860	West Midlands	—
Leicester–Burton upon Trent line		1832–1849	East Midlands, West Midlands	—
Northampton loop		1881	East Midlands, West Midlands	OHLE, 25 kV 50 Hz AC
North Warwickshire Line	Birmingham Snow Hill to Stratford-upon-Avon	1908	West Midlands	—
Rugby–Birmingham–Stafford line		1837	West Midlands	OHLE, 25 kV 50 Hz AC
Shrewsbury–Chester line		1848	North West, West Midlands	—
Stafford–Manchester line		1848–1887	North West, West Midlands	OHLE, 25 kV 50 Hz AC
Stone to Colwich Line		1849	West Midlands	OHLE, 25 kV 50 Hz AC
Stourbridge Town branch line		1879	West Midlands	—
Sutton Park line	Walsall to Castle Bromwich and Water Orton	1879	West Midlands	—
Trent Valley line	Rugby to Stafford; part of the West Coast Main Line	1847	West Midlands	OHLE, 25 kV 50 Hz AC
Walsall–Wolverhampton line		1837	West Midlands	OHLE, 25 kV 50 Hz AC
Welsh Marches line	Newport to Crewe	1852–1858	North West; West Midlands; Mid Wales; South Wales	—
Wolverhampton–Shrewsbury line		1848–1849	West Midlands	—

=== East of England ===
A number of local lines branch from the main radial routes and closer to London are the outer terminals of the suburban network

This is a list of all routes that enter the East of England region.

Name	Route, or previous name	Opened	Regions	Electrified
Abbey Line	Watford Junction to St Albans Abbey	1858	East	OHLE, 25 kV 50 Hz AC
Birmingham–Peterborough line		1840–1860	East, East Midlands, West Midlands	—
Bittern Line	Sheringham to Norwich	1874–1877	East	—
Braintree branch line	Witham to Braintree	1848	East	OHLE, 25 kV 50 Hz AC
Breckland line	Cambridge to Norwich	1845	East	—
Cambridge line	Hitchin to Cambridge	1851	East	OHLE, 25 kV 50 Hz AC
Crouch Valley line	Wickford to Southminster	1889	East	OHLE, 25 kV 50 Hz AC
East Suffolk line	Ipswich to Lowestoft	1854	East	—
Felixstowe branch line	Ipswich to Felixstowe	1877	East	—
Fen line	Cambridge to King's Lynn	1846	East	OHLE, 25 kV 50 Hz AC
Gainsborough line	Marks Tey to Sudbury	1865	East	—
Great Northern Route	London Moorgate to King's Lynn		London, East	OHLE, 25 kV 50 Hz AC
Hereward Line	Ely to Peterborough	1847	East	—
Hertford East branch line	Hertford East to Broxbourne	1843	East	OHLE, 25 kV 50 Hz AC
Hertford loop line	Stevenage to Alexandra Palace	1871–1924	London, East	OHLE, 25 kV 50 Hz AC
Ipswich–Ely line		1846–1851	East	—
Lea Valley lines	London Liverpool Street to Stratford, Chingford, Cheshunt, Enfield Town	1840–1891	London, East	OHLE, 25 kV 50 Hz AC
London, Tilbury and Southend line	Fenchurch Street to Shoeburyness	1854–1888	London, East	OHLE, 25 kV 50 Hz AC
Marston Vale line	Bletchley to Bedford	1845	East, South East	—
Mayflower line	Manningtree to Harwich Town	1854	East	OHLE, 25 kV 50 Hz AC
Peterborough–Lincoln line		1848–1882	East	—
Shenfield–Southend line		1892	East	OHLE, 25 kV 50 Hz AC
Sunshine Coast Line	Colchester to Walton-on-the-Naze or Clacton-on-Sea	1847–1882	East	OHLE, 25 kV 50 Hz AC
Watford DC line	Euston to Watford Junction	1862–1922	London, East	Third rail, 750 V DC
West Anglia Main Line	Liverpool Street to Cambridge or Stansted Airport	1840–1990	London, East	OHLE, 25 kV 50 Hz AC
Wherry Lines	Norwich to Great Yarmouth or Lowestoft	1844–1882	East	—

=== East Midlands ===
There are rail links to adjacent regions and direct services to London

This is a list of all routes that enter the East Midlands region.

Name	Route, or previous name	Opened	Regions	Electrified
Barton line	Barton-on-Humber to Cleethorpes	1848	East Midlands	—
Birmingham–Peterborough line		1840–1860	East, East Midlands, West Midlands	—
Buxton line	Manchester Piccadilly to Buxton	1863	East Midlands, North West	OHLE, 25 kV 50 Hz AC (partial)
Crewe–Derby line		1848	East Midlands, North West, West Midlands	OHLE, 25 kV 50 Hz AC (partial)
Derwent Valley line	Derby to Matlock	1839–1849	East Midlands	—
Doncaster–Lincoln line		1849	East Midlands, Yorkshire and the Humber	—
Glossop line	Manchester Piccadilly to Glossop or Hadfield	1844	East Midlands, North West	OHLE, 25 kV 50 Hz AC
Ivanhoe line	part of the Midland Main Line	1840 or 1993	East Midlands	—
Leicester–Burton upon Trent line		1832–1849	East Midlands	—
Northampton loop		1881	East Midlands, West Midlands	OHLE, 25 kV 50 Hz AC
Nottingham–Grantham line		1850	East Midlands	—
Nottingham–Lincoln line		1846	East Midlands	—
Oakham–Kettering line		1879	East Midlands	—
Poacher Line	Grantham to Skegness	1848–1873	East Midlands	—
Robin Hood Line	Nottingham to Worksop	1848 (reopened 1993–1998)	East Midlands	—
Sheffield–Lincoln line		1849	East Midlands, Yorkshire and the Humber	—
Erewash Valley Line		1844–1862	East Midlands	—

=== Yorkshire and North East ===
There is a concentration of commuter services around Newcastle, Sheffield and Leeds with a number of direct routes to London, Scotland and other regions.

This is a list of all routes that enter the Yorkshire and the Humber and North East England regions.

Name	Route, or previous name	Opened	Regions	Electrified
Durham Coast Line	Newcastle to Middlesbrough	1833–1905	North East	Overhead line, 1,500 V DC (partial)
Esk Valley line	Middlesbrough to Whitby	1835–54	North East, Yorkshire and the Humber	—
Tyne Valley line	Newcastle to Carlisle	1834–1837	North East, North West	—
Northallerton–Eaglescliffe line		1852	North East, Yorkshire and the Humber	—
Tees Valley line	Bishop Auckland to Saltburn	1825–1887	North East	—
Airedale line	Leeds to Skipton	1846	Yorkshire and the Humber	OHLE, 25 kV 50 Hz AC
Askern branch line	Knottingley to Doncaster	1848	Yorkshire and the Humber	—
Calder Valley line	Blackpool North or Manchester Victoria to Leeds	1840s	North West, Yorkshire and the Humber	—
Dearne Valley line	Sheffield to York	1839–40	Yorkshire and the Humber	—
Doncaster–Lincoln line		1849	East Midlands, Yorkshire and the Humber	—
Hallam Line	Sheffield to Leeds		Yorkshire and the Humber	—
Harrogate line	Leeds to York	1848	Yorkshire and the Humber	—
Hope Valley Line	Manchester Piccadilly to Sheffield	1894	North West, Yorkshire and the Humber	—
Huddersfield line	Manchester Piccadilly or Victoria to Huddersfield	1849	North West, Yorkshire and the Humber	Planned
Hull to York Line		1840	Yorkshire and the Humber	—
Leeds–Morecambe line		1846–50	North West, Yorkshire and the Humber	—
Leeds–Bradford lines			Yorkshire and the Humber	OHLE, 25 kV 50 Hz AC (partial)
Northumberland Line	Newcastle to Ashington	2024	North East	—
Penistone Line	Huddersfield to Sheffield	1845–50	Yorkshire and the Humber	—
Pontefract line	Leeds to Goole	1848	Yorkshire and the Humber	—
Selby Line	Leeds to Hull	1834	Yorkshire and the Humber	OHLE, 25 kV 50 Hz AC (partial)
Settle–Carlisle line		1875	North West, Yorkshire and the Humber	—
Sheffield–Lincoln line		1849	East Midlands, Yorkshire and the Humber	—
South Humberside Main Line	Doncaster to Cleethorpes	1848	Yorkshire and the Humber	—
Swinton–Doncaster line			South Yorkshire	—
Wakefield line	Leeds to Sheffield		Yorkshire and the Humber	OHLE, 25 kV 50 Hz AC (partial)
Wharfedale line	Leeds to Bradford Forster Square or Ilkley	1865	Yorkshire and the Humber	OHLE, 25 kV 50 Hz AC
Hull–Scarborough line	Hull to Scarborough	1845–46	Yorkshire and the Humber	—
York–Scarborough line		1845	Yorkshire and the Humber	—

== Scotland ==
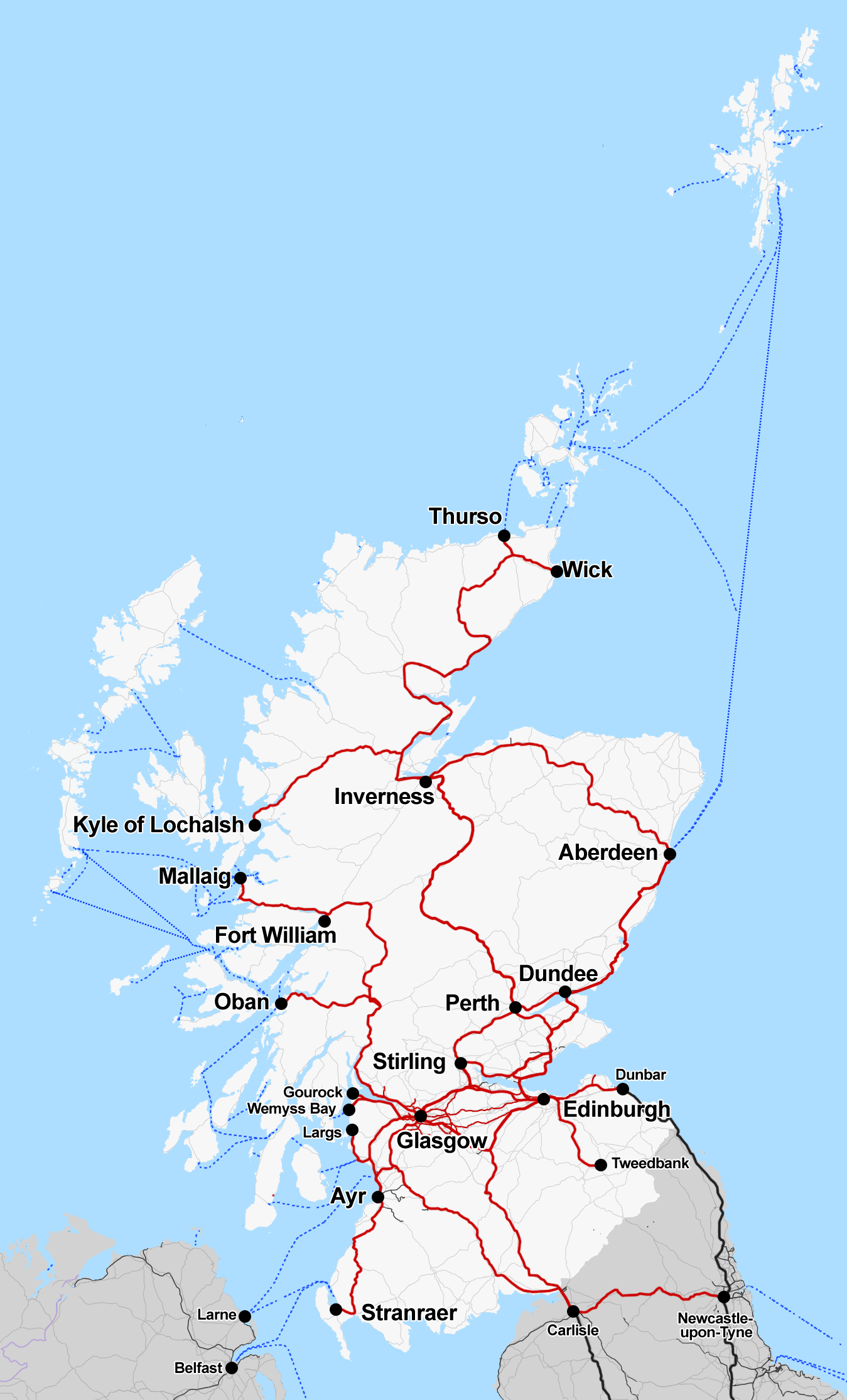
Railway lines in Scotland

=== Scotrail Intercity lines ===
- Edinburgh–Dundee line
- Glasgow–Edinburgh via Falkirk line
- Glasgow–Dundee line
- Highland Main Line
- Dundee–Aberdeen line
- Aberdeen–Inverness line

=== Glasgow commuter lines ===
- Argyle Line
- Ayrshire Coast Line
- Glasgow–Edinburgh via Carstairs line
- Cathcart Circle Lines
- Croy Line
- Cumbernauld Line
- Inverclyde Line
- Maryhill Line
- Motherwell–Cumbernauld line
- North Clyde Line
- Paisley Canal line
- Shotts Line
- Glasgow South Western Line
- Whifflet Line

=== Edinburgh commuter lines ===
- Glasgow–Edinburgh via Carstairs line
- Edinburgh–Dunblane line
- Fife Circle Line
- Levenmouth rail link
- North Berwick Branch
- North Clyde Line
- Shotts Line
- Borders Railway

=== Rural lines and Great Scenic Railways ===
- Borders Railway
- Far North Line
- Kyle of Lochalsh line
- West Highland Line
- Glasgow South Western Lines

== Wales ==
=== Main lines ===
- North Wales Main Line
- South Wales Main Line
- Shrewsbury–Chester line
- Welsh Marches line

=== Cardiff commuter lines ===
- Butetown branch line
- Cardiff City Line
- Coryton Line
- Ebbw Valley Railway
- Gloucester–Newport line
- Maesteg Line
- Merthyr line
- Rhondda line
- Rhymney line
- Vale of Glamorgan Line

=== Rural lines ===
- Borderlands line
- Cambrian Line
- Conwy Valley line
- Heart of Wales line
- West Wales lines

== Lines under construction ==
Name	Between	Opening	Regions	Electrification
High Speed 2	London Euston to Birmingham Curzon Street	c. 2033	South East England	25 kV 50 Hz AC overhead line
Portishead Railway	Bristol Temple Meads to Portishead	c. 2027	South West England	None

== See also ==
- List of closed railway lines in the United Kingdom
