= Melton Mowbray railway station =

Railway station in Leicestershire, England

Coordinates: 52.761°N 0.886°W

Melton Mowbray
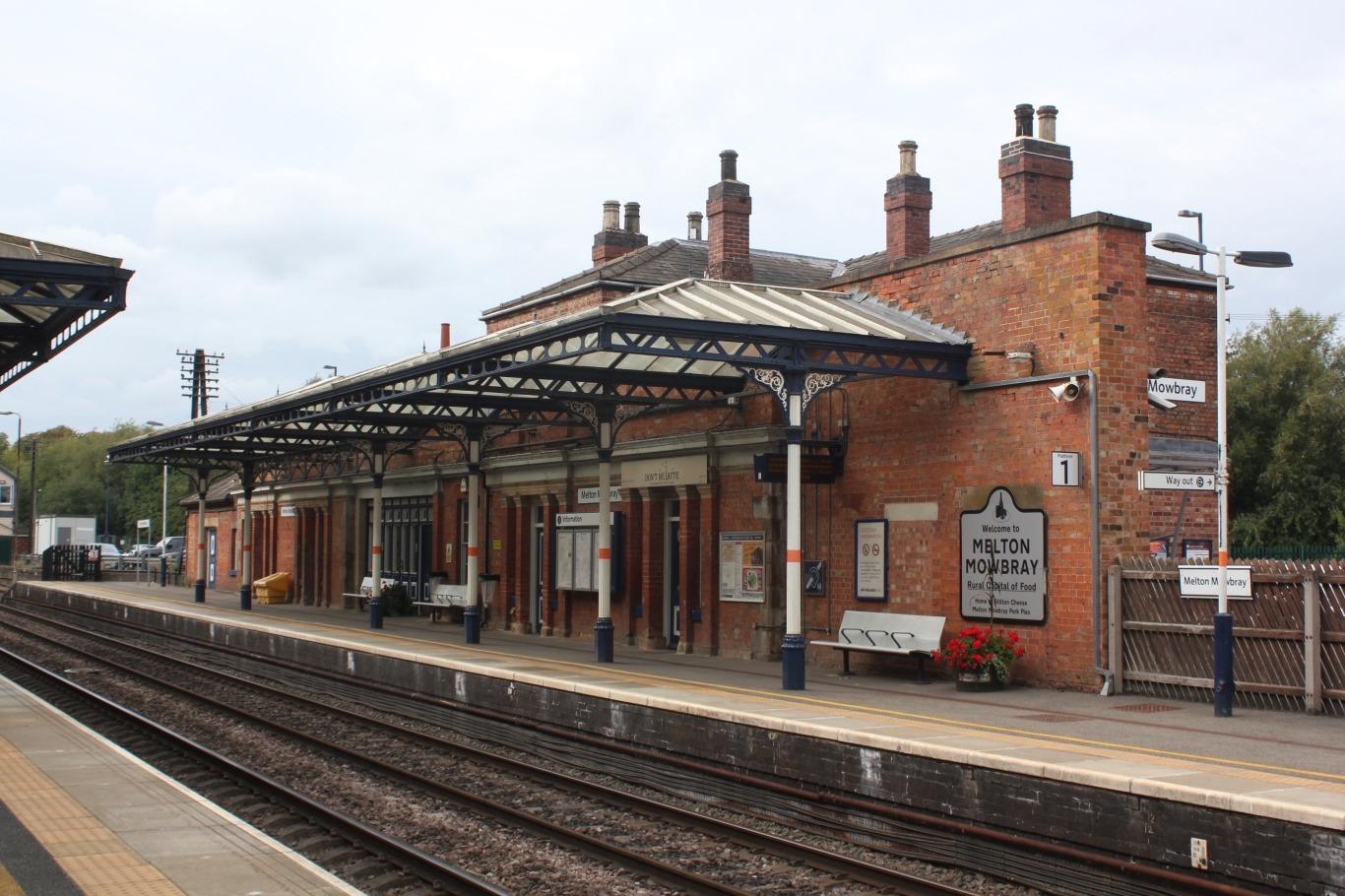

General information
- Location: Melton Mowbray, Borough of Melton; England
- Grid reference: SK752187
- Manager: East Midlands Railway
- Platforms: 2

Other information
- Station code: MMO
- Classification: DfT category E

History
- Pre-grouping: Midland Railway
- Post-grouping: London, Midland and Scottish Railway

Key dates
- 1 September 1846: First station opened as Melton
- 1 May 1848: Station resited
- 1 November 1876: Renamed Melton Mowbray
- 1923: Renamed Melton Mowbray South
- 25 September 1950: Renamed Melton Mowbray Midland
- by 13 September 1957: Renamed Melton Mowbray Town
- 14 June 1965: Renamed Melton Mowbray

Passengers
- 2020/21: ▼47,012
- 2021/22: ▲0.183 million
- 2022/23: ▲0.206 million
- 2023/24: ▲0.235 million
- 2024/25: ▲0.257 million
Location
Notes
- Passenger statistics from the Office of Rail and Road

Melton Mowbray railway station serves the market town of Melton Mowbray in Leicestershire, England. It is owned by Network Rail and operated by East Midlands Railway, though CrossCountry operates most of the services as part of its Birmingham New Street to Stansted Airport route. The station is on the route of the Syston and Peterborough Railway, which is now part of the Birmingham to Peterborough Line. It has a ticket office, which is staffed part-time, a car park, and help points for times when no staff are present.

== History ==
The station was opened by the Midland Railway as Melton (the adjacent signal box is still known as "Melton Station") on 1 September 1846, with two sections of the Syston and Peterborough line, from Leicester to Melton and Stamford to Peterborough. The opening of the former had been delayed by opposition from a landowner, Lord Harborough.

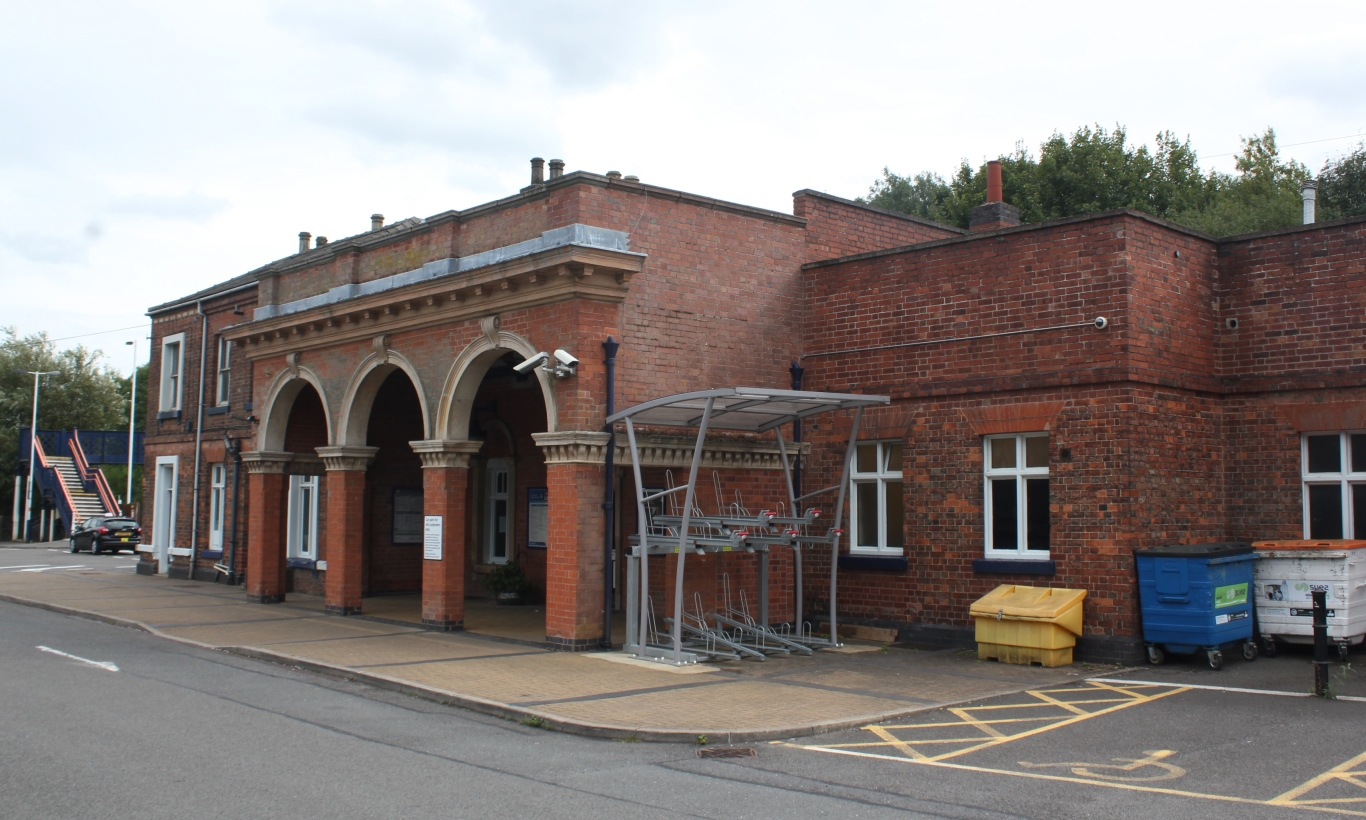
The station building with the later porte-cochère

The building is thought to have been designed by William Parsons and Sancton Wood. It was built by the contractor Herberts at a then cost of £3,021. The porte-cochère was added later by the Midland Railway in an attempt to improve the station in response to competition from the Great Northern and London and North Western Joint Railway which opened its station, Melton Mowbray North, in 1879.

The station was badly damaged by a snowstorm on Tuesday 11 April 1876. The weight of snow on the corrugated iron roof that spanned the two platforms and lines, about 60 yards (55 m) long and 28 yards (26 m) wide, caused the roof to collapse shortly after a goods train had passed through. Fortunately there were no passengers on the platforms and no fatalities. A small section of remaining roof in poor condition was yanked down with a long chain, using a locomotive. The line was cleared in about three hours.

The station has had several names during its existence. After opening as Melton in 1846 it was renamed Melton Mowbray on 1 November 1876 and then Melton Mowbray South in 1923. In 1957 it was renamed Melton Mowbray Town to distinguish it from Melton Mowbray North (though this had closed to regular traffic in 1953). It was given its current name on 14 June 1965.

It was refurbished in 2011 with re-glazed platform canopies, resurfaced platforms, passenger information screens, improved disabled access to the barrow crossing, a full repaint and a new footbridge. The refurbishment of the platforms retained their original length – previous plans to extend them by up to 14 yards (13 m) were omitted. Following this, Melton Mowbray won a "highly commended" award at the National Rail Awards 2014 as Small station of the year.

== Services ==
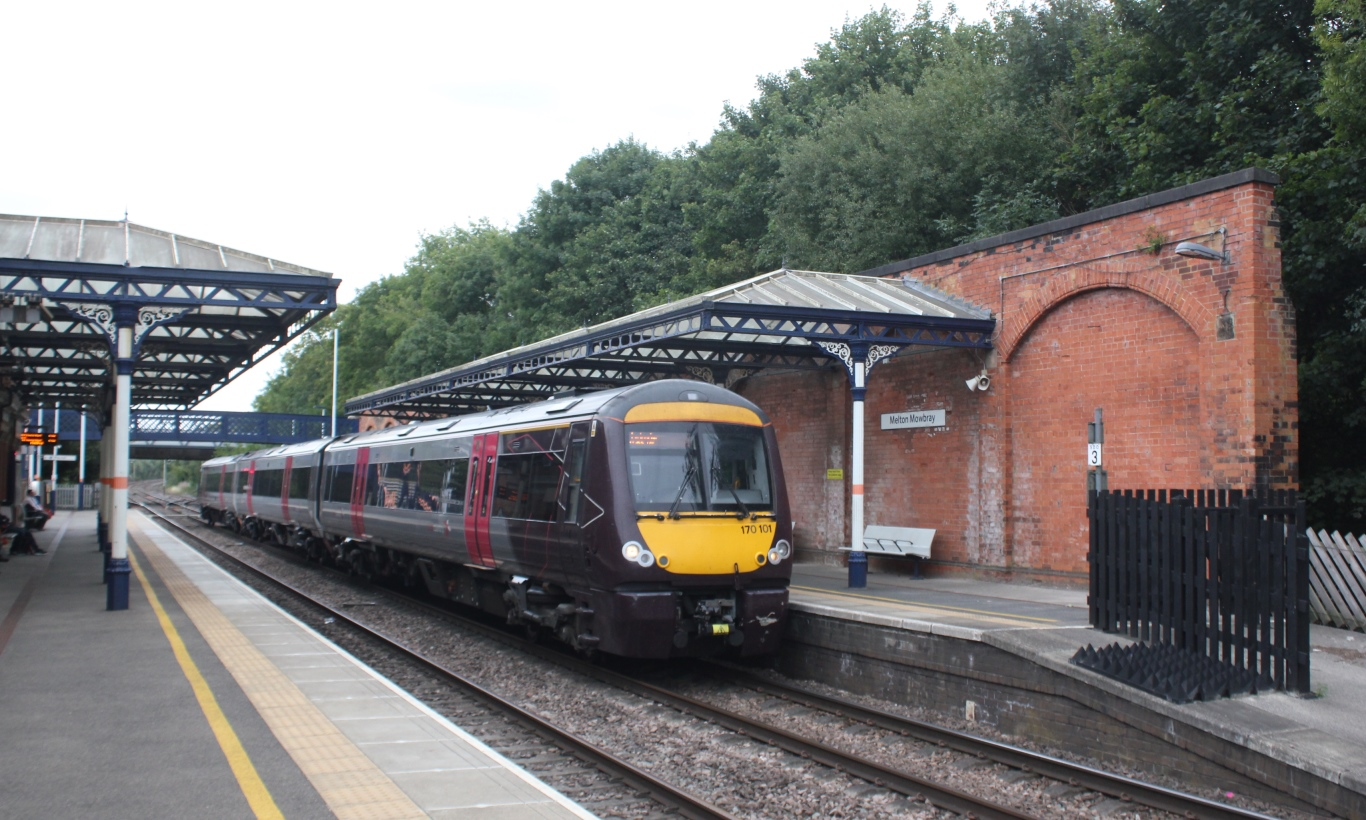
A CrossCountry Class 170 operating to Birmingham, in September 2018

Melton Mowbray has an hourly service off-peak in each direction operated by CrossCountry. Westbound trains run to Birmingham New Street via Leicester, whilst eastbound trains run to Stansted Airport via Cambridge. Additional trains run at peak times, with some terminating at Cambridge.

Although the next station westbound is Syston, there are no direct services between the two.

Despite managing the station, East Midlands Railway (EMR) only operates limited services to the station: a single daily return service to London St Pancras via Corby commenced on 27 April 2009. It is notable as the first regular passenger service to cross the historic Welland Viaduct on the Oakham to Kettering line since 1966. The company introduced a further return service from Derby via East Midlands Parkway (for East Midlands Airport) from May 2010. Further services are being considered. There are two daily services to and from London, one calling at Oakham, Corby, Kettering, Wellingborough, Bedford, and Luton, and the other at Oakham, Corby, Kettering, Wellingborough, Bedford, Luton and Luton Airport Parkway.

A handful of local services operate at either end of the day, mainly for train-crew route-knowledge retention purposes. A morning service runs from Nottingham to Norwich and an evening service from Spalding to Nottingham via Peterborough.

Preceding station	National Rail	Following station
Leicester	CrossCountry Birmingham – Stansted Airport	Oakham
Loughborough	East Midlands Railway Nottingham – Norwich (via Loughborough) Limited Service	Oakham
Terminus	East Midlands Railway Melton Mowbray–London (via Corby) Limited Service	Oakham

== Former services ==
According to the Official Handbook of Stations the following classes of traffic were being handled at this station in 1956: G, P, F, L, H, C and there was a 7-ton crane.

Preceding station	Disused railways	Following station
Asfordby	Midland Railway; Leicester London Road to Peterborough	Saxby
Grimston	Midland Railway; Nottingham direct line of the Midland Railway	Saxby

Part of the former Nottingham direct line of the Midland Railway is now used as the Old Dalby Test Track. This leaves the Leicester line a short distance to the west of Melton Mowbray station and runs towards Nottingham via Old Dalby, continuing as far as the Nottinghamshire village of Edwalton.
