= Welland Viaduct =

Viaduct crossing the valley of the River Welland in Rutland, England

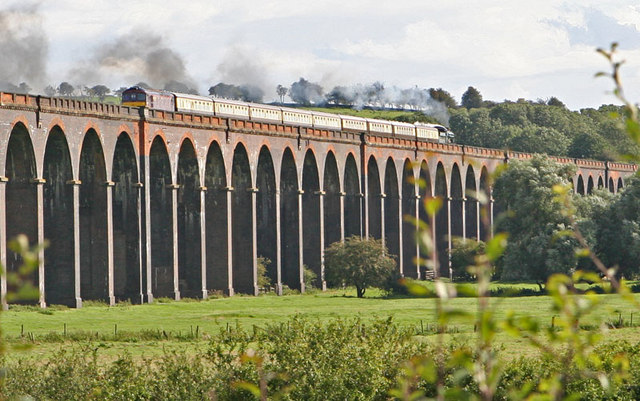
- The viaduct in 2006
- Coordinates: 52°34′1″N 0°39′14″W
- OS grid reference: SP915975
- Carries: Oakham to Kettering Line
- Crosses: River Welland
- Locale: Northamptonshire – Rutland
- Official name: Welland Viaduct
- Owner: Network Rail
- Maintained by: Network Rail
- Heritage status: Grade II listed

Characteristics
- Design: Arch bridge
- Material: Brick
- Total length: 1,275 yd (1.166 km)
- Height: 60 ft (18 m) maximum
- No. of spans: 82

Rail characteristics
- No. of tracks: 2
- Track gauge: 1,435 mm (4 ft 8 1/2 in)
- Structure gauge: RA10

History
- Designer: William Henry Barlow
- Constructed by: Lucas and Aird
- Construction start: 1875
- Construction end: 1878
- Construction cost: £12,000
- Opened: 1880

Location
- Interactive map of Welland Viaduct

Welland Viaduct, Harringworth Viaduct or Seaton Viaduct, crosses the valley of the River Welland between Harringworth in Northamptonshire and Seaton in Rutland, England.

The viaduct is 1,275 yards (1.166 km) long and has 82 arches, each with a 40 feet (12 m) span. It is the longest viaduct across a valley in the United Kingdom. Built by the contractor Lucas and Aird, a total of 30 million bricks were used in the viaduct's construction. Completed during 1878, it has since become a Grade II listed building.

The Welland Viaduct is on the Oakham to Kettering Line between Corby and Manton Junction, where it joins the Leicester to Peterborough line. The line is generally used by freight trains and steam specials. In early 2009, a single daily return passenger service was introduced by East Midlands Trains between Melton Mowbray and St Pancras via Corby, the first regular passenger service to operate across the viaduct since the 1960s. There are now two return services between Melton Mowbray and London St Pancras each weekday. The viaduct is on a diversionary route for East Midlands Railway using the Midland Main Line route.

== History ==
=== Construction ===
In the late 1870s, the Midland Railway commenced construction of the 17-mile line between Kettering in Northamptonshire and Manton, Rutland. The valley of the River Welland was a major geographical obstacle along the selected route for the line requiring the construction of a lengthy viaduct. In 1874, an Act of Parliament was passed, authorising the line's construction. A contract for the construction of the viaduct was tendered, to which London-based civil engineering firm Lucas and Aird was awarded prime contractor status.

The viaduct, which crosses both the Welland Valley and its flood plain, was designed by William Henry Barlow and members of his company, including his son Crawford, who was the resident engineer, and his former pupil Charles Bernard Baker. Crawford described the Welland Viaduct as being: "one of the grandest and most perfect pieces of workmanship to be seen in the United Kingdom".

In 1875, Cyprus Camp was built at the north end of the viaduct adjacent to the village of Seaton to house construction workers and their families. The camp had 47 wooden huts, each typically housing seven men, two women and three children; at its height, it had a reported population of 560 people. Another 12 huts were built at Gretton Hill.

The viaduct was principally built by manual labour. It has been estimated that every man engaged in preparing the ground and building the earthworks shovelled more than 20 tons of earth in a 12-hour shift. At its peak, a workforce of 3,500 and 120 horses were employed along the length of the line. Several workers died during its construction. An account of the workers, Life and Work Among the Navvies, was written by Reverend D. W. Barrett, the vicar of Nassington, curate-in-charge of the Bishop of Peterborough's railway mission.

The viaduct required about 30 million bricks, most of which were fired onsite. W. H. Lorden was the subcontractor for the brickwork, while the bricks themselves were produced by R. Holmes. Additional construction materials included 20,000 cubic yards (15,000 m^{3}) of concrete and 19,000 cubic yards (15,000 m^{3}) of stone. Barrow lime for concrete and mortar was supplied by Ellis and Sons of Mountsorrel Junction, Leicester. The viaduct was built on land belonging to Lieutenant Colonel Tryon of Bulwick Hall.

In March 1876, the first brick of the viaduct was laid; the first arch was completed during June 1877. The piers are articulated at varying intervals by plain pilasters, while the piers' inner faces feature a pair of recessed panels. A projecting parapet pier resting on corbelled panels is positioned at an interval of one in every three arches; these parapets are adorned with stone coping.

All 82 of the viaduct's arches were completed within 13 months. On 5 July 1878, Lieutenant Colonel Tryon keyed the final arch in a ceremony to mark the viaduct's completion. At the time of its construction, only the elevated multi-track approach to London Bridge railway station exceeded the viaduct's length of 1,280 yards (1,171 metres). Even by the early twenty-first century, it remains the longest masonry viaduct across a river valley in the United Kingdom.

=== Operations ===
Opened as a through passenger route on 1 March 1880, the Manton to Kettering line provided Nottingham with a more direct link to London with eight trains per day, four in each direction. On 1 October 1885, the "Slip Coach", entered service to connect with fast trains to London, Northampton, Cambridge and the Eastern Counties at Kettering. By 1903, the line carried over a dozen express and stopping trains in both directions daily.

In 1906, the embankment north of the viaduct collapsed because of insufficient drainage after heavy rain leaving the rails suspended in mid air. During the First World War, the viaduct was attacked by a German Zeppelin, possibly because of its strategic importance in transporting troops to the ports on the English Channel. In 1939, bombing threats issued by the Irish Republican Army (IRA) resulted in the area around the viaduct being placed under guard by police.

In 1967, as a consequence of the Beeching cuts, scheduled passenger services over the viaduct were discontinued, but the line remained open for freight traffic. During 2009, passenger services were reintroduced by East Midlands Trains, becoming the first regular daily passenger service to operate across the viaduct since the 1960s. The line is also infrequently trafficked by chartered heritage trains.

The viaduct's brickwork has suffered from weathering and structural deterioration. Before the privatisation of British Rail, repairs were made by Kettering and Leicester civil engineering staff. Bricklayers reported seeing the imprints of children's hands and feet in the bricks from when they had walked on the clay-filled moulds before firing in the kiln. The viaduct is built from bricks manufactured onsite, which have a red face. Repairs have used other types of bricks, predominantly blue engineering bricks, which have superior water resistance and are stronger, making them suited for arch re-lining and face brick replacement. The use of different bricks has given the viaduct a red-and-blue patchwork appearance in places. Some of the blue bricks have been painted red for aesthetic reasons.

During 2001, restoration efforts commenced on the viaduct. In 2004, in Network Rail's continuous structures maintenance programme, Birse Rail undertook structural repairs; the restoration cost £1.5m (equivalent to £2,710,000 in 2025).. Traditional methods and materials were employed alongside modern access techniques to ensure the viaduct's long-term structural integrity.

Between 2016 and 2017, works in Network Rail's Infrastructure Projects East Midlands Civils Renewals was undertaken by Amco Rail. It addressed brickwork defects and prepared the viaduct for a long-term strengthening scheme aimed at raising its restrictive load capacity rating from RA0 (the lowest rating) to RA10 (the highest rating) so that traffic can cross more quickly. Freight trains with a 25-tonne axle-load were limited to 20 mph when crossing, a major goal of the strengthening measures was to increase this to 60 mph.

The parapets had 20mm joints saw-cut through them to allow for shear movement, reducing the rate of cracking, while over 2,300 20mm-diameter vertical reinforcement bars were installed at one-metre intervals through the brickwork to anchor the parapets to the structure. Vertical cracks were fitted with 6mm stitch bars where applicable, and galvanised steel angle brackets were fixed onto either side of joints where the outwards lean exceeded 40 mm. Network Rail required that no further use be made of pattress plates on the viaduct. Core-drilling of the parapets was performed by a bespoke 900 kg rig, developed by Amco Rail, which reduced the programme's cost by £200,000 over conventional means even when including its development cost.

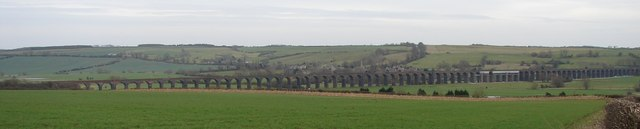
Welland Viaduct in 2009, viewed from Seaton
