= Oakham–Kettering line =

Railway line in the East Midlands of England

Coordinates: 52°39′N 0°43′W

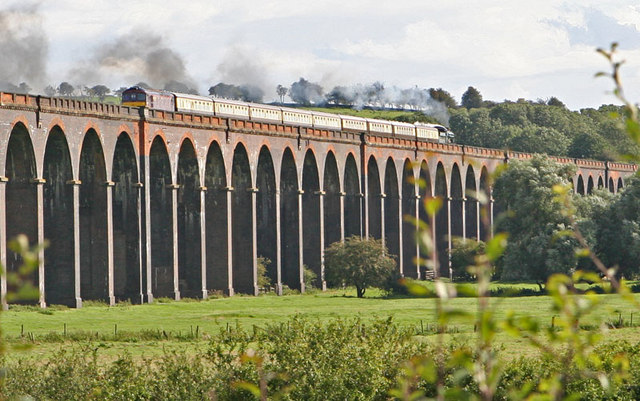
- The Welland (Harringworth) Viaduct

Overview
- Status: Operational
- Owner: Network Rail
- Locale: East Midlands
- Termini: Glendon (Kettering North) Junction; Manton Junction
- Stations: 1

Service
- Type: Inter City, Heavy rail
- System: National Rail
- Operator(s): East Midlands Railway; GB Railfreight; Freightliner
- Rolling stock: Class 360 "Desiro"

Technical
- Number of tracks: Two
- Track gauge: 1,435 mm (4 ft 8 1/2 in) standard gauge
- Loading gauge: W7
- Electrification: 25 kV 50 Hz AC OHLE (Corby to Kettering)
- Operating speed: Below 100 mph (160 km/h)
Route map
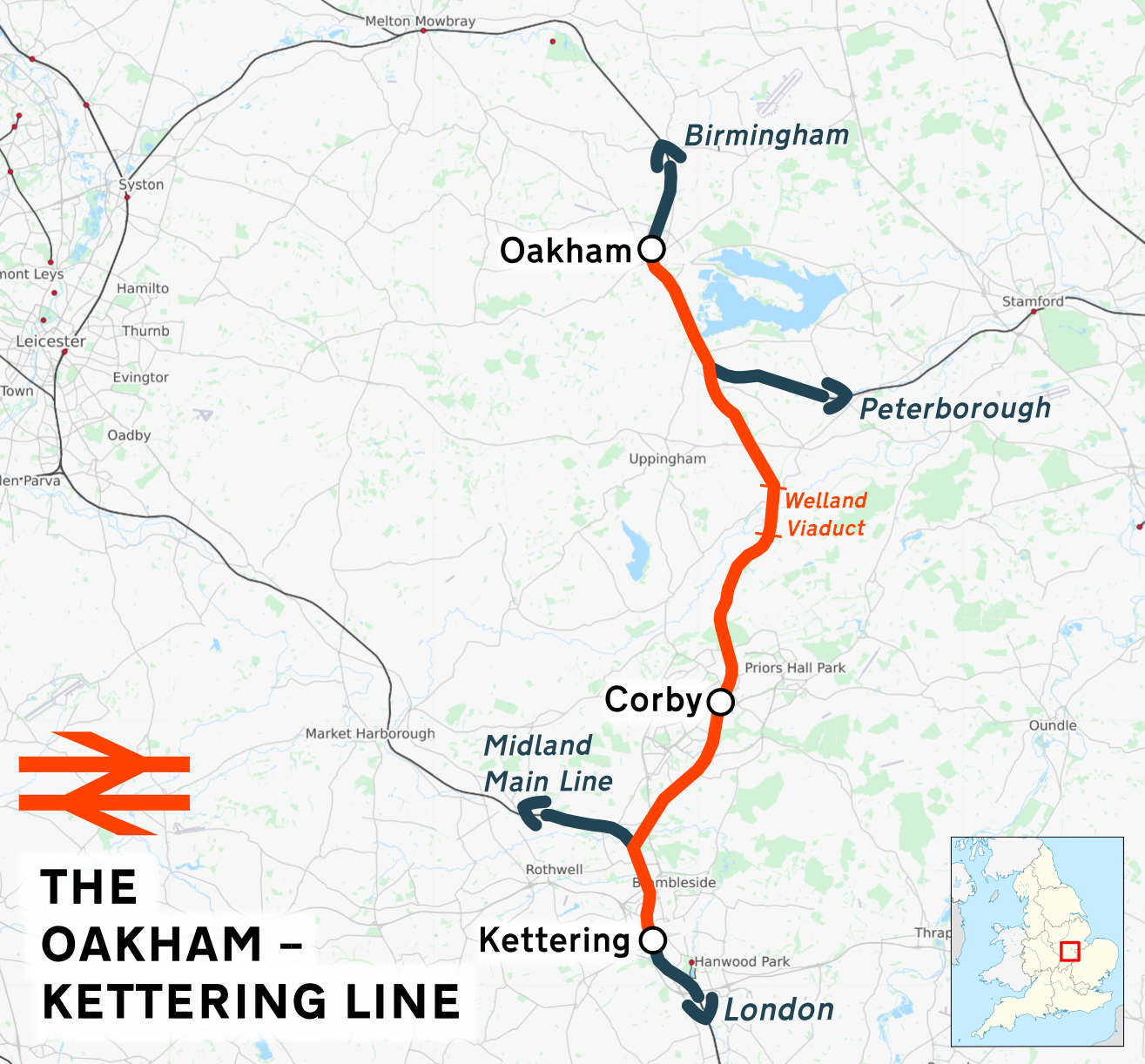
(Click to expand)

The Oakham–Kettering line is a railway line in the East Midlands of England. Currently it has one passenger station in operation, at Corby.

== Current service ==
Corby railway station is served by two trains per hour to and from London St Pancras via Kettering, Wellingborough, Bedford and Luton. The minimum journey time between Corby and London is 1 hour and 14 minutes. Two trains per day continue north of Corby to Melton Mowbray via Oakham, one of which starts at Kettering.

== History ==
The line was built in the 19th century as part of the Midland Railway. Its most notable engineering features are the Welland Viaduct (also called Harringworth Viaduct) and Corby Tunnel. The line was a major part of the Midland Main Line between London St Pancras, Nottingham, Leeds and Carlisle carrying named expresses such as The Waverley.

The line was opened for goods traffic on 1 December 1879 and for passenger traffic on 1 March 1880.

British Railways withdrew passenger services in 1967. Thereafter BR used the line mainly for freight traffic, and as an important diversionary route for Midland Main Line passenger trains during disruption or engineering work.

In 1977 the Parliamentary Select Committee on Nationalised Industries recommended considering electrification of more of Britain's rail network. By 1979 BR presented a range of options to do so by 2000, some of which included the Oakham to Kettering and Birmingham–Peterborough lines. Under the 1979–90 Conservative governments that succeeded the 1976–79 Labour government, the proposal was not implemented.

Corby railway station was reopened in 1987 with a shuttle service between there and Kettering, but the service had a poor timetable and unreliable trains which led to the service being withdrawn in 1990. A Corby-Kettering bus shuttle connecting with trains was introduced in August 1996.

A new Corby station opened on 23 February 2009, initially served by one return train per day to London St Pancras, operated by East Midlands Trains. A fuller service, with 13 daily return trains to London, started on 27 April 2009. Two trains per day in each direction extend north of Corby to Oakham and Melton Mowbray, one of which starts at Kettering. These services do not run on weekends.

== Electrification ==
In 2019, work started on the section of line between Kettering and Corby, as well as the line to Bedford, for electrification. Work has since been completed and Class 360 trains now run services terminating at Corby from St. Pancras International.

== Sources ==
- Anonymous (Winter 1979). Railway Electrification. British Railways Board (Central Publicity Unit). pp. 0–2, 8.
