= Oakham railway station =

Railway station in Rutland, England

Coordinates: 52°40′21″N 0°44′04″W

Oakham
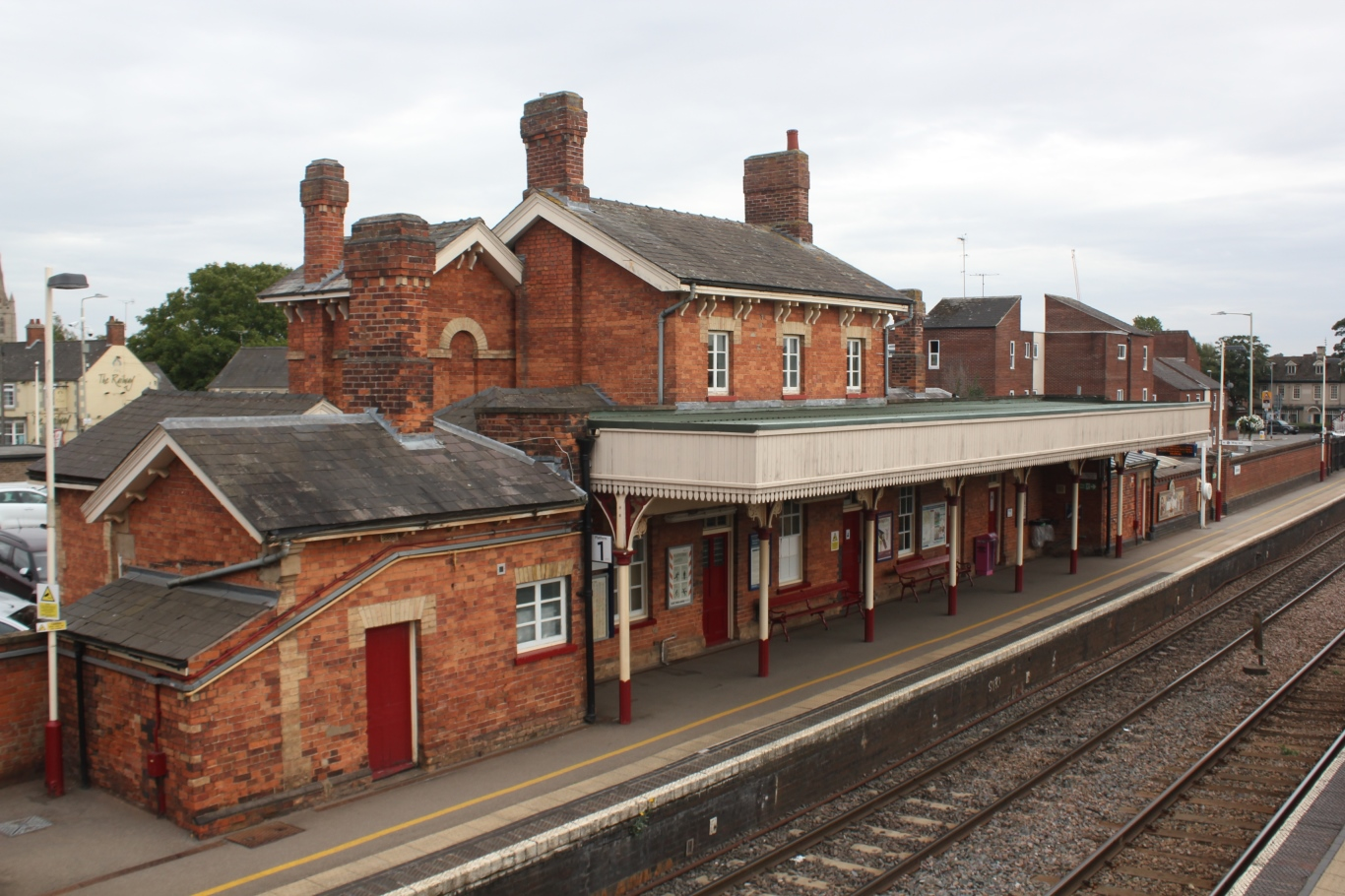

General information
- Location: Oakham, Rutland; England
- Grid reference: SK856090
- Managed by: East Midlands Railway
- Platforms: 2

Other information
- Station code: OKM
- Classification: DfT category E

History
- Original company: Midland Counties Railway
- Pre-grouping: Midland Railway
- Post-grouping: London, Midland and Scottish Railway

Key dates
- 1 May 1848: Station opened

Passengers
- 2020/21: ▼29,220
- Interchange: ▼461
- 2021/22: ▲0.154 million
- Interchange: ▲1,459
- 2022/23: ▲0.172 million
- Interchange: ▲3,345
- 2023/24: ▲0.206 million
- Interchange: ▼2,597
- 2024/25: ▲0.226 million
- Interchange: ▲3,005

Listed Building – Grade II
- Feature: Oakham Railway station
- Designated: 14 February 1990
- Reference no.: 1252768
Location
Notes
- Passenger statistics from the Office of Rail and Road

Oakham railway station serves the county town of Oakham in Rutland, England. The station is situated on the line is the Birmingham to Peterborough Line, 93 miles 61 chains (150.9 km) from London St Pancras via Corby, and is approximately halfway between Leicester to the west and Peterborough to the east.

Oakham is the only surviving passenger railway station in Rutland. The line is served by CrossCountry services between Birmingham New Street and Stansted Airport or Cambridge. There is also an infrequent East Midlands Railway service to London St Pancras.

== History ==
The station was opened by the Midland Railway on 1 May 1848. The building was designed by the company architect, Edward Wood of London, and is Grade II listed.

== Facilities ==
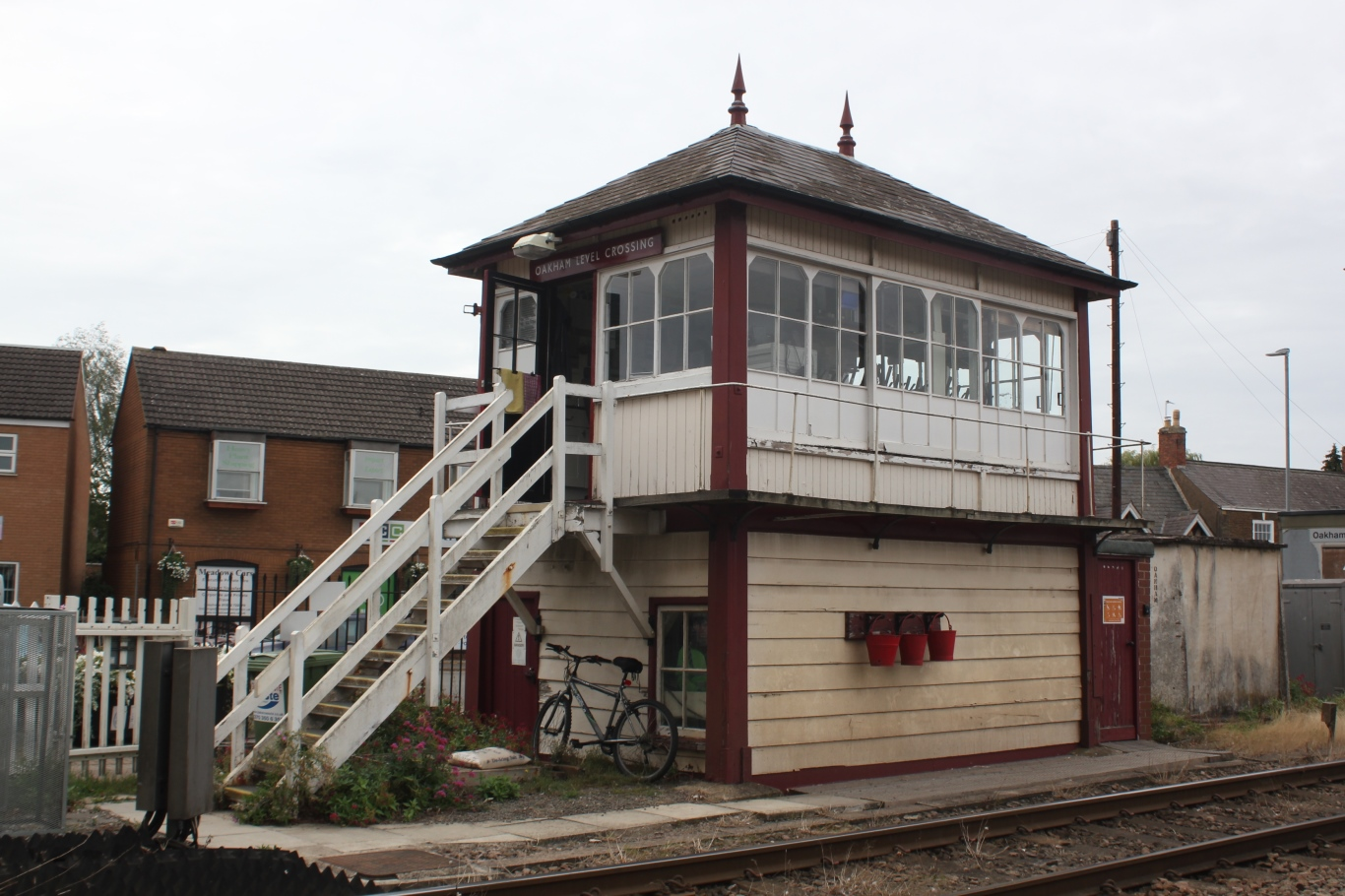
The signal box

The station building, the nearby level crossing signal box and footbridge are all listed buildings. The signal box, built in 1899, was the prototype for the Airfix kit signal box. The station footbridge was refurbished between October 2020 and April 2021.

The station has a ticket office which is staffed seven days a week, a car park, and help points for times where there are no staff present.

== Passenger volume ==
Passenger Volume at Oakham
	2002–03	2004–05	2005–06	2006–07	2007–08	2008–09	2009–10	2010–11	2011–12	2012–13	2013–14	2014–15	2015–16	2016–17	2017–18	2018–19	2019–20	2020–21	2021–22	2022–23
Entries and exits	183,240	192,995	189,377	208,508	215,523	226,106	202,358	214,922	199,252	203,668	202,718	208,754	212,676	221,118	226,920	239,038	244,696	29,220	154,014	172,176
Interchanges	– (Note: No data available.)	0	0	0	0	177	1,358	4,431	4,940	5,225	3,658	4,165	4,406	4,720	4,848	2,457	1,739	461	1,459	3,345

The statistics cover twelve month periods that start in April.

== Services ==
There is an hourly service in each direction operated by CrossCountry. Services run westbound to Birmingham New Street via Leicester, whilst services eastbound run to Stansted Airport via Cambridge.

Despite managing the station, East Midlands Railway operate only a limited number of services. A single daily return service to London St Pancras commenced on 27 April 2009 running via Corby and is notable for being the first regular passenger service to cross Welland Viaduct since 1966. The company introduced a further return service from Derby via East Midlands Parkway (for East Midlands Airport) from May 2010. An early morning service runs from Nottingham to Norwich and an evening service operates from Spalding via Peterborough to Nottingham.

Preceding station	National Rail	Following station
Melton Mowbray	CrossCountry Birmingham–Stansted Airport	Stamford
Melton Mowbray	East Midlands Railway Nottingham–Norwich (via Loughborough) Limited Service	Stamford
Melton Mowbray	East Midlands Railway Melton Mowbray–London (via Corby) Limited Service	Corby
	Historical services	
Ashwell	Midland Railway; Leicester to Peterborough; Nottingham direct line of the Midland Railway	Manton

== Bibliography ==
- Quick, Michael (2023). Railway Passenger Stations in Great Britain: A Chronology (PDF) (5th ed.). London: Railway and Canal Historical Society.
