= Thames–Clyde Express =

Thames-Clyde Express
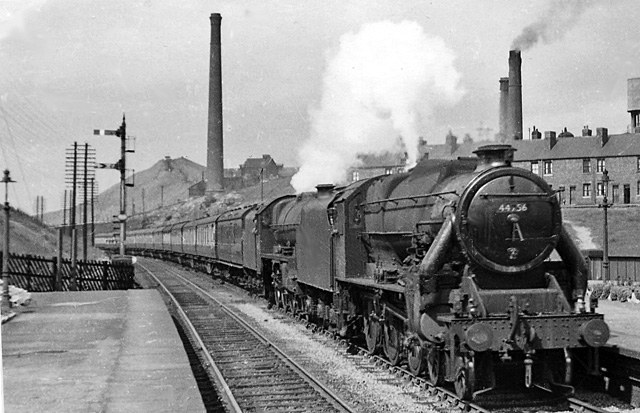
- The Thames-Clyde Express on 24 July 1951 at Royston and Notton station.

Overview
- Service type: Passenger train
- First service: September 1927
- Last service: May 1974
- Former operator(s): LMS, BR

Route
- Termini: London St Pancras; 1927-1966 Glasgow St Enoch; 1966-1974 Glasgow Central
- Service frequency: Daily
- Line(s) used: Midland Main Line

The Thames–Clyde Express was a named express passenger train operating on the Midland Main Line, Settle-Carlisle Railway and the Glasgow South Western Line between London St Pancras and Glasgow St Enoch. Following the closure of St Enoch station in 1966, the service ran to Glasgow Central instead.

In September 1927, the London Midland & Scottish Railway gave the name to its morning services departing from London St Pancras and Glasgow St Enoch. After the service was speeded up in 1932, trains departed Glasgow at 09:30 and London at 10:00. There was a similar service running between London St Pancras and Edinburgh Waverley which was known as the Thames–Forth Express, renamed The Waverley by British Railways in 1957.

== The route (from London) ==
Starting from St Pancras, the Thames–Clyde Express travelled by the former Midland Railway's main line through Leicester, sometimes with reversals when serving Derby and Nottingham, as far as Leeds. After another reversal there, the train crossed the Pennines to the scenic Settle-Carlisle route, still on former Midland Railway territory. Crossing into Scotland, the train used the former Glasgow and South Western Railway's Glasgow South Western Line into Glasgow St Enoch, the city's G&SWR terminus. The train could not compete for London-to-Scotland traffic with the faster trains travelling on the West Coast Main Line. Its route was longer and steeper, and Midland expresses could not ignore major population centres en route, especially Leicester, Sheffield and Leeds. In Scotland, it took a longer route in order to provide a service to Dumfries and Kilmarnock.

As a result, few travellers after the 1920s travelled the full length of the route. The Thames–Clyde lost its title at the outbreak of World War II, in common with almost all named trains in the UK. However, the title was restored in September 1949 as part of the post-war return to normality.

The effect of regional division, mining subsidence along part of the route between Trent and Leeds, and underpowered locomotives meant that its performance was actually inferior in time to that achieved in 1939.

In 1962, the Thames–Clyde took eight hours and 50 minutes for the complete journey, leaving London at 10.15, and then calling first at Leicester London Road at 11.52. Further stops were made at Trent and Chesterfield, before reaching Sheffield Midland station at 13.19 and Leeds City at 14.25 - so this latter stage of 39 miles took over an hour as a result of subsidence-induced speed restrictions. From there, the train ran non-stop to Carlisle (arrival 16.38). Three more stops were made at Annan, Dumfries, and Kilmarnock before reaching Glasgow, St Enoch at 19.05.

The rival Royal Scot on the West Coast route stopped only twice and took seven hours, twenty minutes. However, the Thames–Clyde provided a useful service from the East Midlands and Yorkshire to Scotland.

== Run down and cessation ==
In 1964, The Waverley ceased to run during the winter, and so additional coaches for Edinburgh were carried on the Thames–Clyde. But the train then made additional stops on the Settle & Carlisle line which were otherwise served by The Waverley: Skipton, Hellifield, Settle and Appleby West railway station. The 1966 closure of St Enoch resulted in the transfer of the service to Glasgow Central. In December 1967, Trent station was closed and so from New Years Day 1968, a further delay was added by a stop at Nottingham, which meant a reversal. In 1970, a short-lived Sunday diversion to Derby brought another reversal, although this had ceased by 1973. The train had acquired a bad reputation for slowness and unpunctuality.

=== Cessation of services ===
The train lost its title in 1975 when the West Coast Main Line was electrified to Glasgow, but the service continued to run until 1976.

== Timetables used as sources ==
- Passenger Timetable 1970 / 71 London Midland Region Publisher British Railways
- Passenger Timetable 1973 / 74 London Midland Region Publisher British Railways
