= Waverley (passenger train) =

Overview
- Service type: Passenger train
- Predecessor: Thames Forth Express
- First service: September 1927
- Last service: 1968
- Former operator(s): London, Midland and Scottish Railway; British Rail

Route
- Termini: London St Pancras; Edinburgh Waverley
- Service frequency: Daily
- Line(s) used: Midland Main Line

The Waverley, originally called the Thames–Forth Express, is the name of an express passenger train which operated on the Midland Main Line from St Pancras railway station to Edinburgh Waverley and which ceased in 1968.

The original name was given to the morning departure from London by the London, Midland and Scottish Railway in September 1927. Its sister train to Glasgow, which departed an hour later, was named the Thames–Clyde Express.

The Waverley travelled by the scenic Settle–Carlisle line, but could not compete on speed to Scotland with the trains travelling on the East Coast Main Line via York. Its route was longer and steeper, and Midland expresses could not ignore major population centres en route. As a result, after the 1920s few passengers travelled the full length of the route.

The Thames–Forth lost its title at the outbreak of World War II in common with almost all named trains in the UK. It was not restored this time as, The Waverley until June 1957. However, the effect of regional division, mining subsidence along part of the route, and underpowered locomotives meant that its performance was actually inferior in time to that achieved in 1939.

In 1962, the train left London at 09:15. It used what is now mainly a freight, Leicester-avoiding route (see Oakham–Kettering line) and stopped first at Nottingham Midland at 11:13. After calling at Chesterfield it reached Sheffield Midland at 12:18 and Leeds City 13:26—so a journey of 39 miles (63 km) took over an hour as a result of subsidence-induced speed restrictions. Then came stops at Skipton, Hellifield, Settle and Appleby West before Carlisle was reached at 15:31. Five more stops in the border country were made at Newcastleton, Hawick, St Boswells, Melrose and Galashiels before final arrival at Edinburgh Waverley at 18:34. This was a journey of 9 hours 15 minutes; the Flying Scotsman left London at 10:00 and took only six hours.

However, the Waverley provided a useful service from the East Midlands and Yorkshire to Edinburgh, and also provided a direct London service to the small towns on the Settle-Carlisle route, and in the Scottish borders between Carlisle and Edinburgh (the Waverley Route). Unfortunately, by this time the train had acquired a bad reputation for slowness and unpunctuality.

The Waverley ceased to run during the winter after 1964, but continued to operate during the summer until September 1968.
