= Corby railway station =

Railway station in Northamptonshire, England

Corby
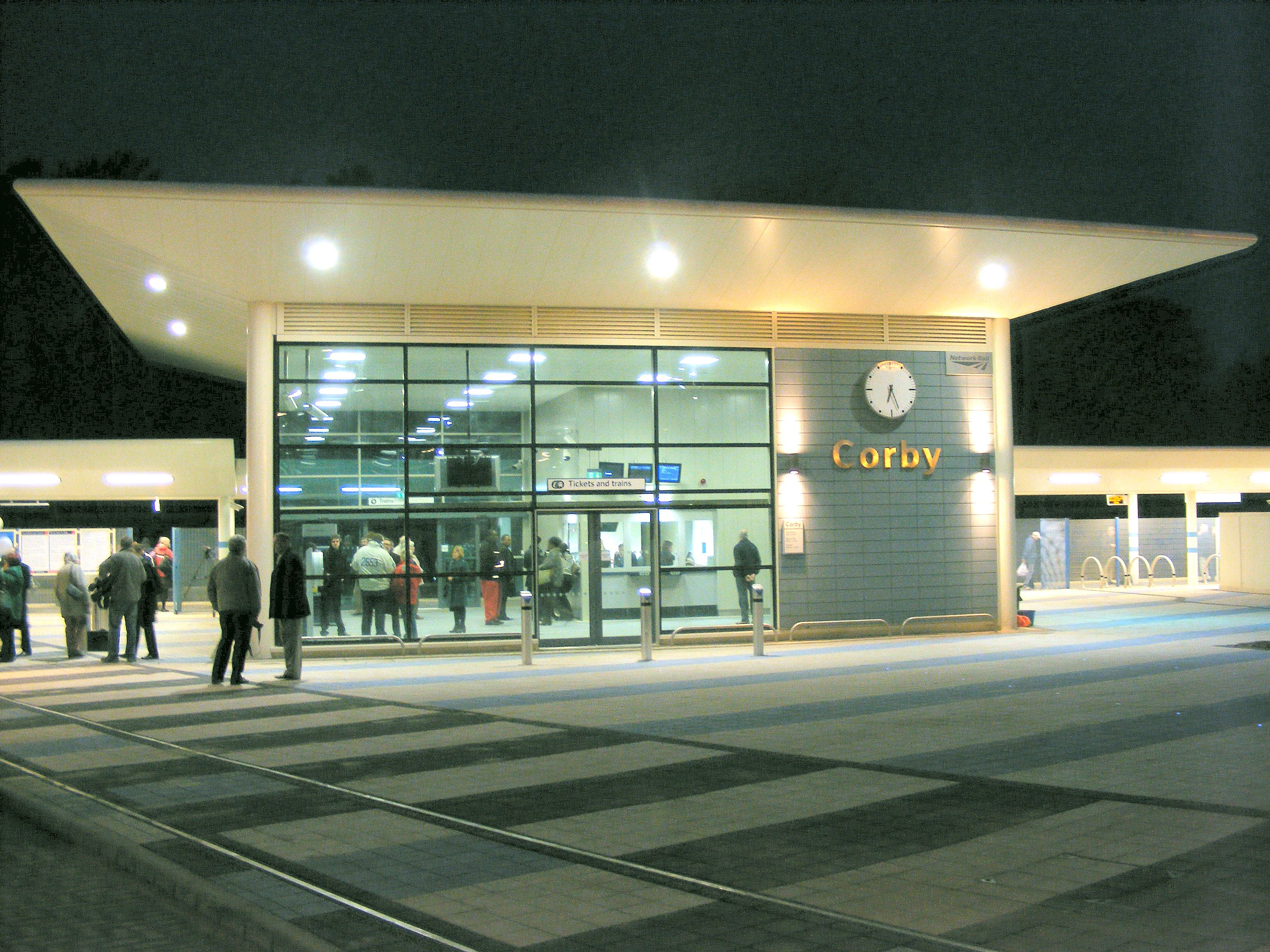

General information
- Location: Corby, North Northamptonshire; England
- Coordinates: 52.489°N 0.688°W
- Grid reference: SP891886
- Managed by: East Midlands Railway
- Platforms: 1

Other information
- Station code: COR
- Classification: DfT category E

Key dates
- 1879: Opened
- 18 April 1966: Closed
- 13 April 1987: Reopened
- 2 June 1990: Closed
- 23 February 2009: Reopened

Passengers
- 2020/21: ▼65,878
- 2021/22: ▲0.300 million
- 2022/23: ▲0.402 million
- 2023/24: ▲0.499 million
- 2024/25: ▲0.561 million
Location
Notes
- Passenger statistics from the Office of Rail and Road

Corby railway station serves the town of Corby, in Northamptonshire, England. It is owned by Network Rail and managed by East Midlands Railway. The current station was opened on 23 February 2009, replacing the original entity which was open between 1879 and 1966; it had reopened temporarily between 1987 and 1990.

Plans for the current station, opposite the original, were approved in late 2007. It opened with just one daily train each way on Mondays to Fridays; a service of hourly trains to and from London began on 27 April 2009, after East Midlands Trains had taken delivery of the additional trains needed for its implementation.

== History ==
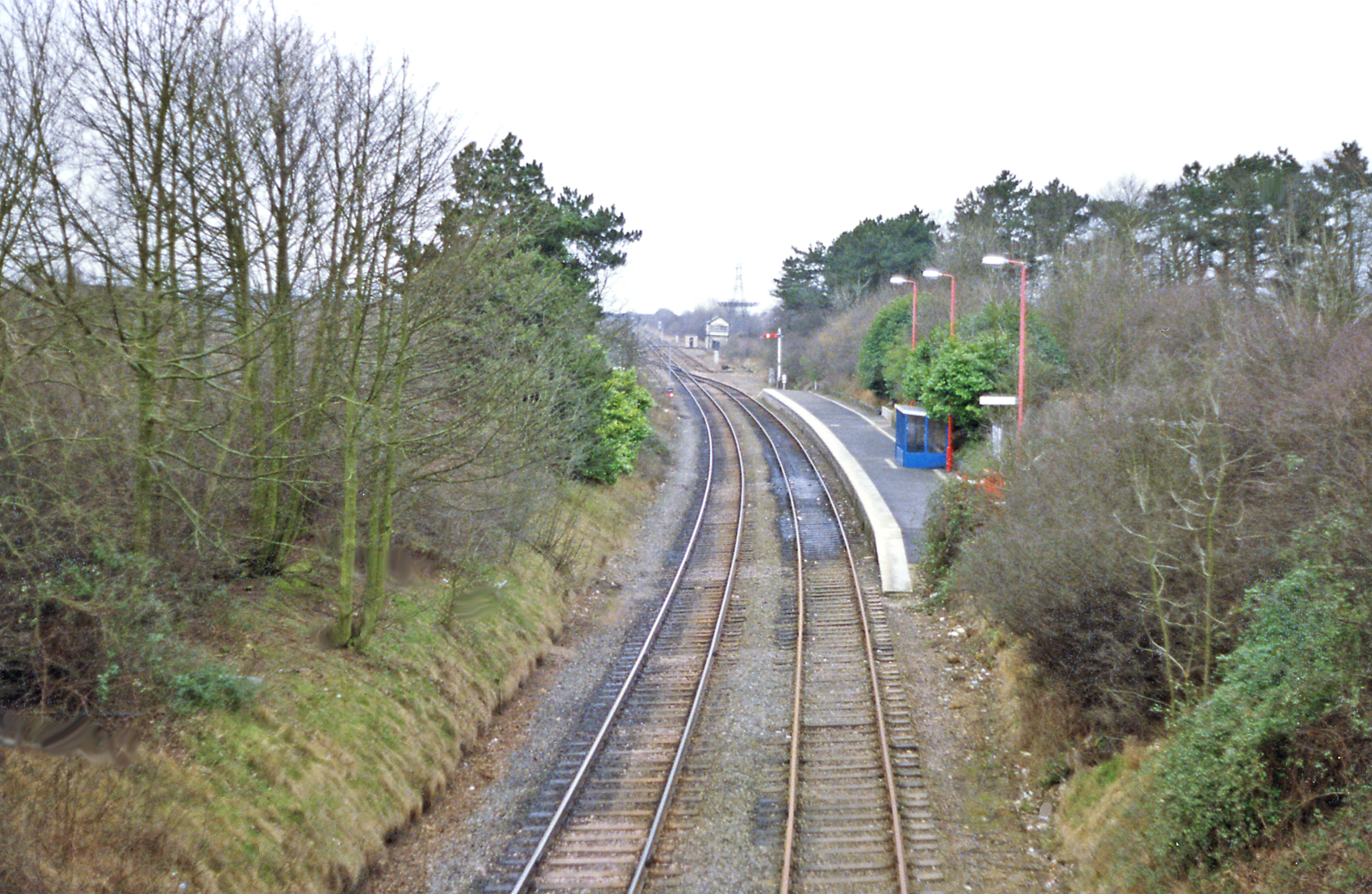
The briefly used 1987 station, seen here in 1990 shortly before closure.

The Midland Railway opened Corby station in 1879. It was on the Nottingham direct line of the Midland Railway between Kettering and Nottingham, serving Corby, Oakham and Melton Mowbray, instead of Market Harborough, Leicester and Loughborough. The station was initially named "Weldon and Corby" to avoid confusion with Corby Glen station in Lincolnshire, which closed in 1959. British Railways (BR) withdrew passenger services from all stations on the Oakham to Kettering Line, including Corby, in May 1967. For some decades, Corby was one of the largest towns in Europe without a railway station (claimed as the largest in an episode of Series C of BBC TV show QI in 2005).

BR kept the Oakham to Kettering line through Corby open for freight and as a diversionary route. It reduced the southern end of the line, from Glendon Junction (near Kettering) to Corby, to single track in 1986 after the closure of the town's steel works saw freight traffic levels decline. On 13 April 1987, a passenger service of 11 (Note: Northamptonshire Evening Telegraph records there as being 11 daily trains, while The Railway Magazine says there were 10 daily trains.) shuttle trains daily between Corby and Kettering, usually operated by a single DMU, was reintroduced with local council subsidy. There was an increased service on Saturday, but no service on Sundays. More than 100,000 people used the service within the first 12 months and an extension to Leicester was proposed. However, the service became unreliable and the council withdrew its subsidy, leading Network Southeast to withdraw the service on 2 June 1990.

== Reopening ==
=== Proposals ===
The East Midlands Branch of the independent campaign group Railfuture proposed that the Kettering – Corby line should be included in a cross-country Swindon – Peterborough service, but this was not implemented. In 2001, Midland Mainline, the rail operator of the Midland Main Line franchise, decided against building a new station for Corby. In 2003, Corby's urban regeneration company, Catalyst Corby, announced plans to build a new station by 2011.

In June 2006, the Department for Transport (DfT) told prospective bidders for the new East Midlands rail franchise (combining Midland Main Line services from London St Pancras and the eastern section of the Central Trains network) that they would have to include in their tenders a price for a service to a new station in Corby. The DfT's East Midlands rail franchise consultation noted that Corby had been targeted for substantial housing growth over the course of the franchise and the provision of a station would be in line with the Sustainable Communities Plan. A new service could be created as an extension of the hourly London to Kettering service.

=== Announcements ===
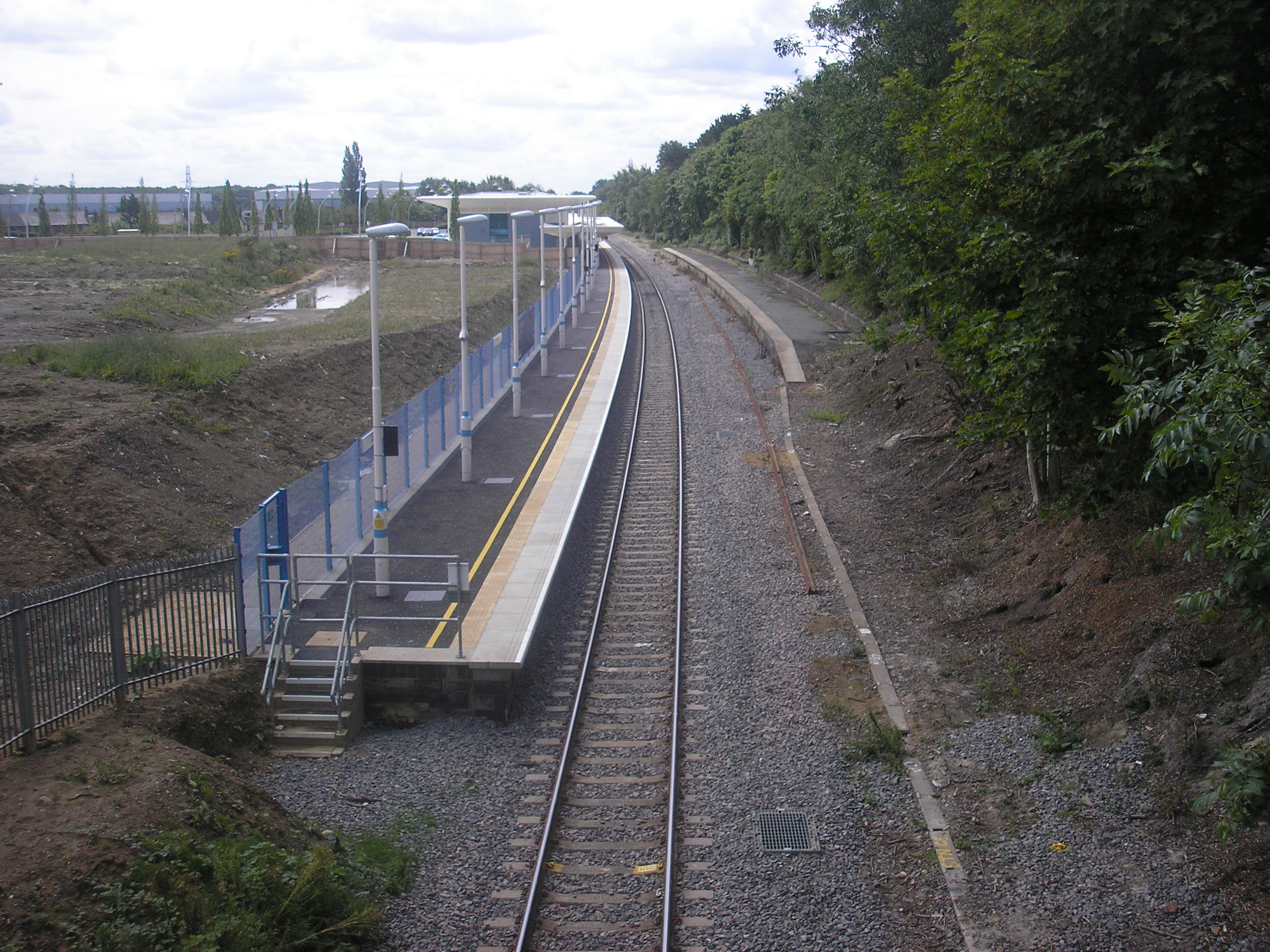
The new station at Corby, looking south. The platform of the 1987 station can be seen on the right.

In April 2007, Network Rail announced that it had allocated £1.2-million towards the rebuilding of the station as a response to housing and jobs growth in the county. A final decision on the station, planned to be open by December 2008, would be made by the Department for Transport. On 22 June, the DfT confirmed that Stagecoach had won the franchise and revealed that the company – operating as East Midlands Trains (EMT) – would run an extra hourly London to Kettering service, with the possibility of extending this to a new station in Corby and putting Corby within 75 minutes of central London.

An article in the June 2008 edition of Modern Railways, produced in co-operation with EMT, suggested that, from December 2008, Corby could be served by trains leaving St Pancras for Kettering at 8 minutes past each hour. However, pending the removal of infrastructure constraints – notably, the need to reinstate a third track between Wellingborough and Kettering and raise the line speed between Corby and Kettering – an hourly through-service to and from Corby would have been unfeasible initially, trains being unable to make the run from Kettering to Corby and back within the projected timings. Therefore, with the possible exception of some peak-time services, the connection to and from Corby would have to be provided mostly by a shuttle service, with a change of trains at Kettering. For this, EMT would need to lease additional rolling stock, speculated to be Class 222 stock cascaded from Hull Trains. In addition, DfT approval of the hourly Kettering service was still awaited.

Services had been due to start on 14 December 2008, but EMT admitted that it had yet to secure agreement with the DfT and the rolling stock company (ROSCO) for the four additional trains needed. EMT then announced that services would not commence until 20 March 2009.

The station's opening was then brought forward to 23 February 2009, but with a very limited interim timetable of one train to London and back each day. EMT promised that more services would begin once an additional three trains had become available. On 7 April 2009, East Midlands Trains announced that the full hourly service (13 trains each way) would begin from Monday 27 April 2009.

Transport secretary Geoff Hoon presided over the official opening of the station on 30 April 2009, with hourly passenger trains to London and a limited northbound service.

=== Design and construction ===
Site clearance works in March 2008. The platform from the old station can just be seen at the right of the picture, below some 'British Rail lights', from the period when the station was briefly open in the 1980s.

The North Northants Development Company and English Partnerships submitted plans for the design of the station in late July 2007 and detailed planning permission was granted by the Council in November. The Development Company predicted that the new station would unlock an estimated £200-million of further commercial investment in Corby, creating more than 1,200 jobs. It added that the station would also provide added impetus for residential development and aid the transformation of town centre shopping and civic facilities.

The project cost £8.3 million, and construction began in June 2008, following the conclusion of an agreement with Kettering construction firm Mainline Contractors. The station was built at Station Road, adjacent to the site of the old station, to act as a transport interchange for Corby, with bus and taxi facilities being relocated there. A new road was planned to lead into the interchange, which would also have a 140-space car park, taxi rank, drop-off and pick-up areas and a bus area. Site clearance works began in March 2008 and were completed in the summer.

The station is the third to be built to the modular station design developed by Network Rail, following Mitcham Eastfields and Greenhithe. There has been criticism of the design by the Commission for Architecture and the Built Environment that:

[t]here is no evidence of strong design thinking and little indication to suggest the concept has been considered as an integrated whole. This can be read in the awkward junction between the station building and the canopy and poor siting of the railings and street furniture in relation to the station structure. There is also a lack of finesse to the elevations, as illustrated by the mismatch between doors and panels. Taken together, these shortcomings lend the station an ungainly and impoverished form.

— Commission for Architecture and the Built Environment,

An artist's impression of the station was on the website of the local MP, Phil Hope. In June 2009, it was announced that the station had won the Chartered Institution of Highways and Transportation's Award for Effective Partnerships and received praise for having been built on time, within budget and to a high standard.

== Future ==
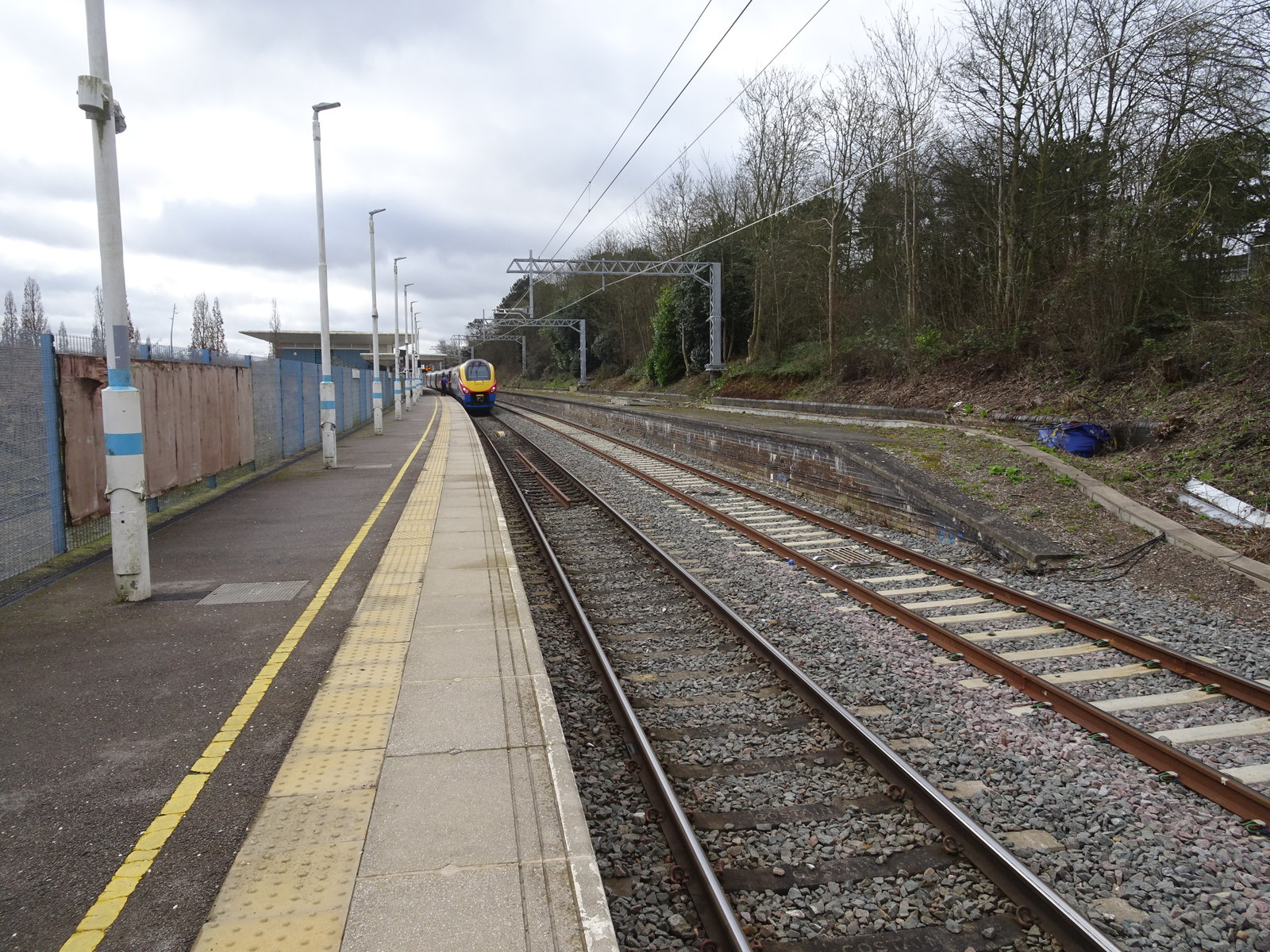
Redoubled line and electrification since 2021. The platform of the 1987 station can be seen on the right.

It was planned that a half-hourly London St Pancras International to Nottingham via Corby service would be operated by East Midlands Railway from May 2021 using Class 360 electric trains, once the Midland Main Line has been electrified beyond Bedford as part of the Electric Spine project. However large portions of the spine project were cancelled. Network Rail did complete the re-doubling of the singled Glendon Junction to Corby section as part of the overall upgrade scheme in March 2018. Electric services were duly introduced in May 2021. Although the spine project has been cancelled, the Midland Main Line railway upgrade is in progress with the electrification and modernisation of the section from Kettering to Market Harborough ongoing from December 2021. In addition, the Integrated Rail Plan for the North and Midlands published by the DfT on 18 November 2021 shows the entire line to Sheffield will now proceed. Meanwhile, the planning of building 150 new flats to the south of the station was approved by Corby council in May 2018.

=== East-West Rail – Northern Route ===
The Kettering – Manton line via Corby was also considered for reopening to passengers as part of the East West Rail between Oxford, Cambridge and Norwich. Three routes were considered, with Corby on the northern route. A new chord would have been needed at Manton for direct running between Corby and Stamford. Despite being the cheapest of the three options, the northern route has been ruled out as being too indirect.

=== Electrification and associated works ===
In July 2009, the Labour government published a document and said it was looking at electrification of the Midland Main Line but no funds had been committed. When originally planned and announced, the line upgrade was costed at £1.6 billion and it was expected that the line would be electrified as far as Kettering and Corby by 2017. The 2012 announcement by the Conservative led coalition government was that electrification of the railway line between Bedford, Wellingborough, Corby, Leicester, Derby, Nottingham and Sheffield would go ahead. This was part of the High Level Output Specification for Control Period 5. This was also part of a rolling programme of railway electrification projects. An extra track was to be installed between Kettering and Corby. It appeared in the autumn statement of 2011.

2012 Department for Transport plans for rail electrification in England and Wales by 2019 including Northern Hub (red), Electric Spine (yellow/green), Great Western Main Line and South Wales Main Line (red) and Valleys & Cardiff Local Routes (blue). For 'HLOS', see Network Rail > Control periods.

A 2014 RAIL Magazine article gave a detailed account of the work ahead. The whole Midland Main Line scheme also overlapped with the Electric Spine project. In June 2015, Patrick McLoughlin paused the electrification project but on 30 September 2015 the scheme was restarted. The completion dates were now three years later than originally planned, with electrification to Kettering and Corby now targeted for completion in 2019. The line from Kettering to Corby was to be doubled, and Network Rail started work in June 2015. The Enhancements plan update of January 2016 showed the project on target. In January 2021 electrification of the Midland Main Line to Corby was completed. The electrified line is being fed via the autotransformer system. A new grid feeder will be needed at Braybrooke, just south of Market Harborough. Work was announced as starting on the grid feeder in the Market Harborough area on 8 April 2021. The transformers were delivered to site in December 2021.

== Services ==
With the introduction of the EMR Connect Service in May 2021, Corby now has two electric trains per hour to London. EMR operates two intercity trains each way per day from Melton Mowbray and Oakham to London St. Pancras International, one of which terminates at Kettering. EMR also operates an intercity train for the weekends from St. Pancras International to either Sheffield or Nottingham for one train going either destinations.

In 2023, the "Connect" services were rebranded as "Luton Airport Express", to promote that they serve Luton Airport Parkway.

Preceding station	National Rail	Following station
Kettering	East Midlands Railway Oakham–Kettering line	Terminus
Kettering	East Midlands Railway Oakham–Kettering line	Oakham Limited Service
Disused railways
Geddington Line open, station closed	Midland Railway Nottingham Direct Line	Gretton Line open, station closed
