= Birmingham–Peterborough line =

Cross-country railway line in England

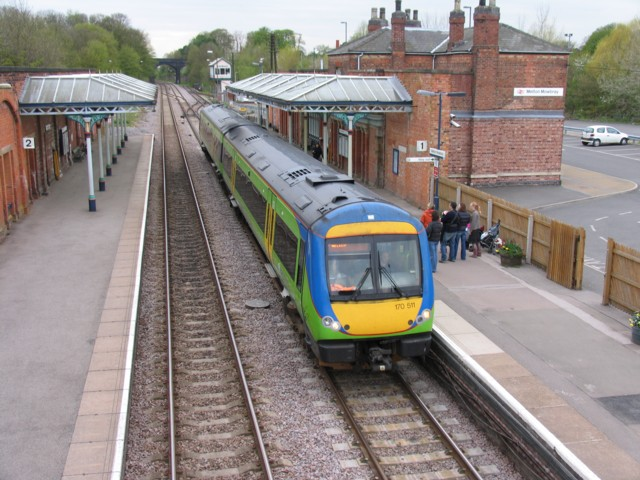
- Central Trains Class 170 Turbostar at Melton Mowbray in 2006

Overview
- Status: Operational
- Owner: Network Rail
- Locale: East of England; East Midlands; West Midlands
- Termini: Birmingham New Street; Peterborough
- Stations: 13

Service
- Type: Heavy rail
- System: National Rail
- Operator(s): CrossCountry; East Midlands Railway; GB Railfreight; Freightliner Group; DB Cargo UK
- Rolling stock: Class 170 Turbostar; Class 222 Meridian

History
- Opened: 1846

Technical
- Number of tracks: 2
- Character: Secondary
- Track gauge: 4 ft 8 1/2 in (1,435 mm) standard gauge
- Loading gauge: W10
- Operating speed: less than 100 mph (160 km/h)
Route map
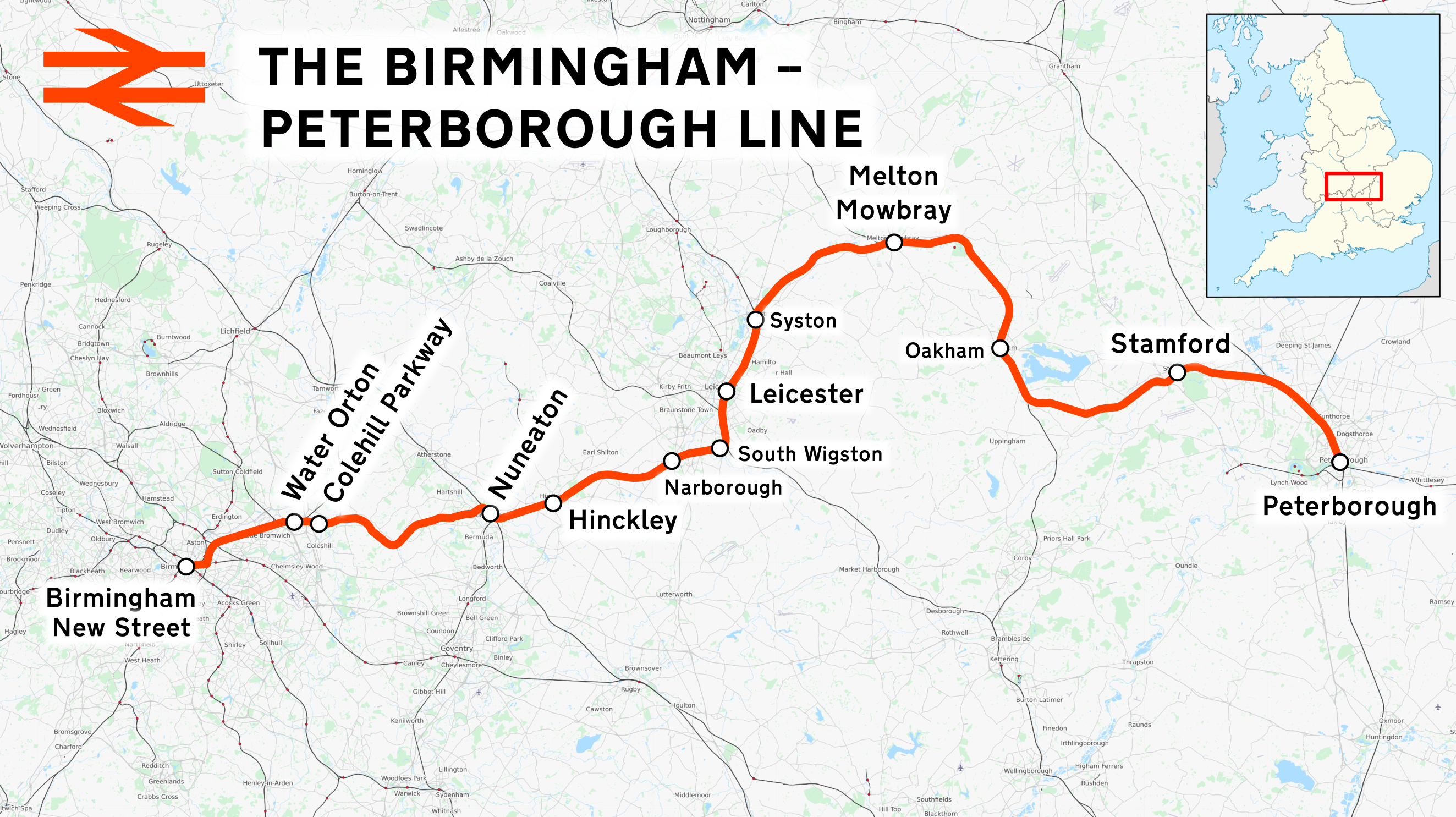
(Click to expand)

The Birmingham–Peterborough line is a cross-country railway line in England, linking Birmingham, Leicester and Peterborough, via Nuneaton, Oakham and Stamford.

Since the Beeching Axe railway closures in the 1960s, it has been the only direct railway link between the West Midlands and the East of England. The line is important for cross-country passenger services; east of Peterborough, the route gives access from the Midlands to various locations in the East of England, such as Ely, Cambridge and Stansted Airport via the West Anglia lines. It is also strategically important for freight, for it allows container trains from the Port of Felixstowe to travel to the Midlands and beyond.

== History ==
The present route is an amalgamation of lines that were built by separate companies. The sections were:

- The route from Birmingham to Whitacre Junction was built for the Birmingham and Derby Junction Railway in 1840, which later became part of the Midland Railway.
- The line from Whitacre junction to Nuneaton was built by the Midland Railway, and opened in 1864.
- The line between Nuneaton and Wigston was built by the South Leicestershire Railway and was also completed in 1864. The South Leicestershire Railway was taken over by the London and North Western Railway in 1867.
- The section between Wigston and Syston via Leicester was built for the Midland Counties Railway (a forerunner of the Midland Railway) in 1840. It is now part of the Midland Main Line.
- The eastern section, the Syston and Peterborough Railway, was built for the Midland Railway and opened in 1846.

The entire route became part of the London, Midland and Scottish Railway in the 1923 grouping, and the LMS was nationalised on 1 January 1948 as part of British Railways.

Most Birmingham–Leicester passenger trains were taken over by diesel units from 14 April 1958, taking about 79 minutes between the two cities.

In 1977, the Parliamentary Select Committee on Nationalised Industries recommended considering electrification of more of Britain's rail network. By 1979, BR presented a range of options to do so by 2000, some of which included the Birmingham-to-Peterborough Line. Under the 1979–90 Conservative governments that succeeded the 1976–79 Labour government, the proposal was not implemented.

The route was privatised in the 1990s as part of Railtrack and is now part of Network Rail.

== Services ==
In the 1980s, local services were worked by Class 105 Diesel Multiple Units and long-distance services, such as those between Birmingham New Street and Norwich, were operated by formations of Class 31 locomotives with rakes of four Mark 1 carriages. From 1986 the first Sprinter trains operated on the line, Class 150s, subsequently replaced by Class 156 SuperSprinter units from 1988. From this time, the service operated hourly between Birmingham New Street and Ely with alternate services continuing to Cambridge (Stansted Airport from 1991) or Norwich.

Central Trains operated the route from privatisation, and for operational convenience combined services on the route either side of Birmingham New Street, which created through services such as Aberystwyth and Chester to Cambridge and Stansted Airport and Liverpool Lime Street to Stansted Airport, although these were subsequently cut back. Services to Aberystwyth ceased in 2001, although a few services continued to terminate at Shrewsbury until 2004, while Liverpool was removed in 2003 to improve performance.

The service in 2016 consisted of two trains per hour between Birmingham and Leicester, one of the two calling at limited stops to Leicester and continuing to Stansted Airport via Peterborough, Ely and Cambridge, operated by CrossCountry. East Midlands Railway operates a handful of services along the section between Syston and Peterborough (serving Melton Mowbray and Oakham) as part of its London St Pancras service via Corby. In addition, there are a few services between Nottingham and Norwich operated by EMR which also serve Stamford.

Cross Country services are exclusively worked by Class 170 Turbostar units, while EMR use Class 158 Express Sprinter trains on services to Norwich and Class 222 Meridian trains for London services. In addition, EMR also operate an evening Spalding to Nottingham service which is worked by a Class 170 Turbostar.

Freight trains use the route between the West Midlands and East Anglia, primarily container trains to the Port of Felixstowe and sand trains to King's Lynn.

== 2010s developments ==
=== Felixstowe and Nuneaton freight capacity scheme ===
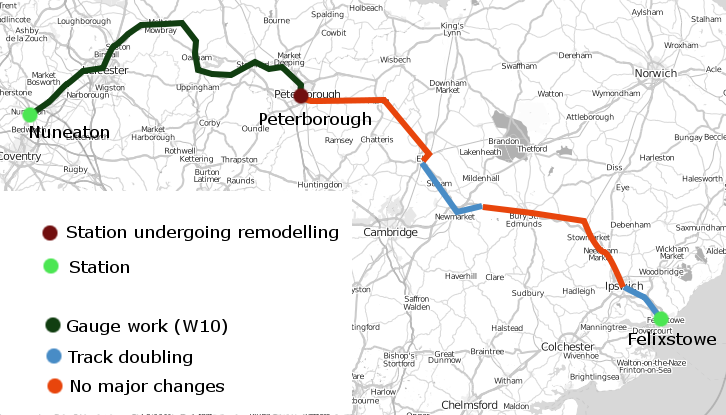
Route for Felixstowe to Nuneaton freight capacity scheme

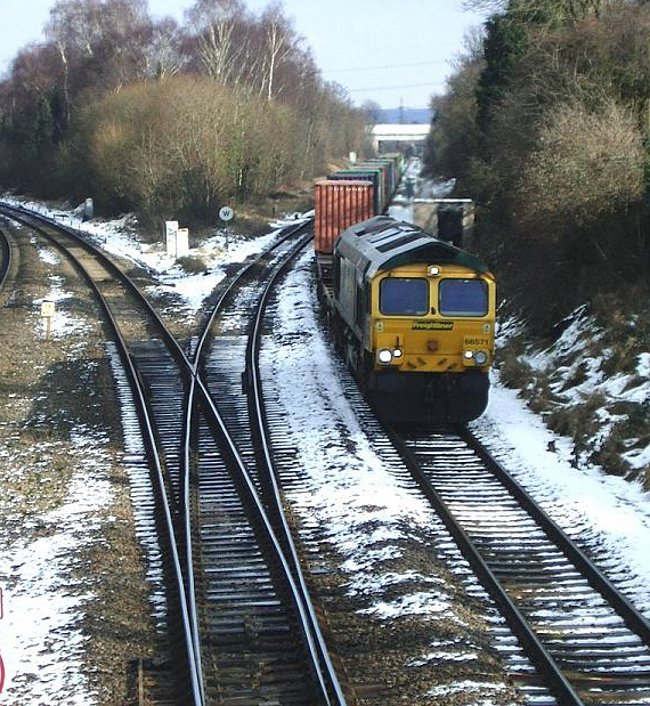
A container train from Nuneaton approaches Water Orton station

Felixstowe and Nuneaton freight capacity scheme
- Proposer: Network Rail
- Cost estimate: £291 million
- Completion date: 2014

The Felixstowe–Nuneaton railway upgrade is a large project with a number of elements that will allow more railfreight traffic between the Haven ports and the Midlands. The work was prompted by the 'Felixstowe South' expansion at the Port of Felixstowe. It is also in response to the predicted increase in the number of high-cube (Hi-cube) shipping containers arriving at the ports that cannot currently be accommodated on the route. The percentage of high-cube containers increased from 30% in 2007 to 50% in 2012. Without loading gauge enhancement these larger containers would have had to be transported by road or via a longer rail route via London that was already operating at capacity. Network Rail completed the gauge enhancement from Ipswich to Peterborough in 2008. Work took place in three phases:

- Phase 1
  - Nuneaton North Chord (see below)
  - Peterborough to Nuneaton Gauge (W10) (see below)
- Phase 2a
  - Doubling 8 km of the Felixstowe Branch Line
  - Doubling the Ipswich to Ely Line between Soham Junction and Ely
  - Raising speed restrictions for freight trains between Ipswich and Peterborough
- Phase 2b
  - Capacity enhancement Peterborough to Nuneaton during CP5

The work, detailed in the Network Rail Freight Route Utilisation Strategy, was intended to be completed by 2014. at an estimated cost of £291 million.

The government is providing £80 million and it will also receive £5 million from Network Rail and £1 million from the East of England Development Agency. It has been estimated that the scheme would take 225,000 lorries off the road.

In February 2010 Network Rail confirmed that it would construct the 1 km 'Bacon Factory Chord' in Ipswich to allow trains to travel between the East Suffolk line and the Ipswich–Ely line without reversing into Ipswich Station and to also perform work to increase capacity between Ely–Peterborough line at a total cost of £50m. It was stated that the work would "take 750,000 lorries off the roads".

=== Peterborough to Nuneaton gauge ===
Enhancement of a section of the Birmingham–Peterborough line involving the reconstruction of 14 bridges, 11 tracking lowering/slewing schemes and one accommodation bridge. The cost is estimated at £40.5 million. The West Coast Main Line is already cleared to W10 and the route from Nuneaton to Birmingham is already cleared to W12. W10 gauge clearance was achieved on 4 April 2011 and GBRf trains requiring W10 gauge began using the route that day.

=== Nuneaton North Chord ===
The Nuneaton North Chord was completed and opened on 15 November 2012. The chord allows freight traffic approaching Nuneaton from Felixstowe via the Birmingham–Peterborough line to proceed north on the West Coast Main Line without conflicting with southbound main-line trains. It consists of a one-mile chord from the existing flyover over the West Coast Main Line to join the line to the north. The cost of this work was £25.6 million. A Transport & Works Act Order for the Nuneaton North Chord was granted by the Secretary of State for Transport in July 2010. Work began in mid-2011.

== Sources ==
- Railway Electrification. British Railways Board (Central Publicity Unit). Winter 1979. pp. 0–2, 8.
