= Wigston railway station =

Wigston railway station has been the name of two stations on the Midland Railway in Leicestershire, England.

- Wigston railway station on the Midland Counties Railway was opened in about 1840 and renamed Wigston South in 1857. British Railways (BR) closed it in the 1960s.
- Wigston railway station on the Midland Main Line was opened in 1857 and later renamed Wigston Magna. BR closed it in the 1960s.

The term should not be confused with either of two other railway stations in the Wigston area.

- Wigston Glen Parva railway station on the South Leicestershire Railway was opened in about 1868 and later renamed Glen Parva. BR closed it in the 1960s.
- South Wigston railway station, east of the former Wigston Glen Parva railway station on the north loop of Wigston junction of the South Leicestershire Railway. Now the Birmingham to Peterborough Line. It was opened in 1986 by Leicestershire County Council. It is still in service.
