= Croft railway station, Leicestershire =

Railway station in Leicestershire, England

Croft
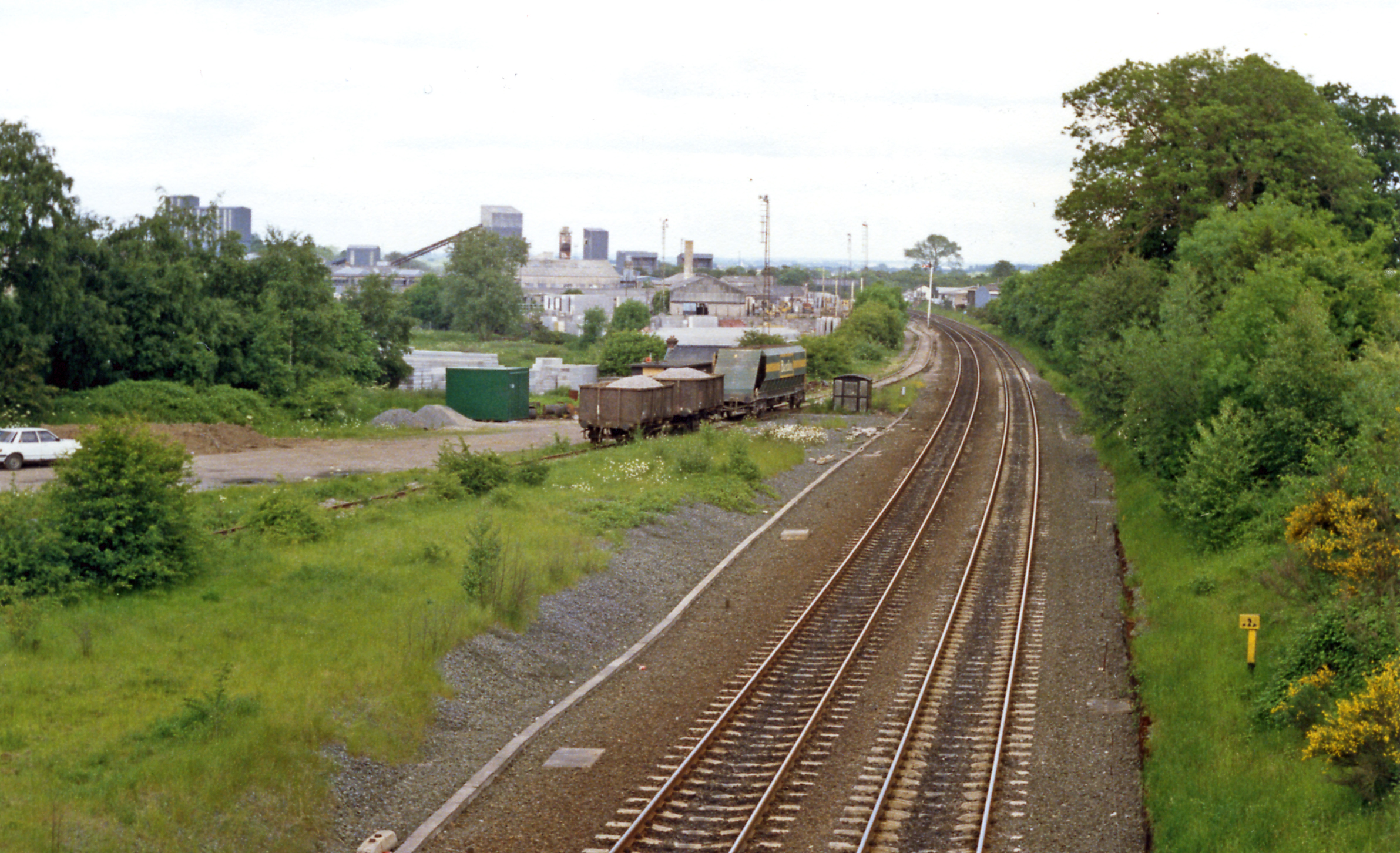
- Croft railway station in 1988

General information
- Location: Narborough, Blaby; England
- Coordinates: 52.5572°N 1.2455°W
- Grid reference: SP512957
- Platforms: 2

History
- Original company: London and North Western Railway
- Pre-grouping: London and North Western Railway
- Post-grouping: London, Midland and Scottish Railway

Key dates
- 1 December 1877: Opened
- 4 March 1968: Closed
Location

Croft railway station was a railway station serving the village of Croft in Leicestershire. It was on the Birmingham to Peterborough Line about 9 miles (14 km) southwest of Leicester. The line is owned by Network Rail.

== History ==
The station was opened on 1 December 1877 by the London North Western Railway, at a cost of £1209.

British Rail closed the station on 4 March 1968.

The station was of timber, modular construction, similar to that of the LNWR on the Rugby to Stamford Railway, with simple timber braces to support the awning. Access was from the main driveway and footpaths from the adjacent footbridge. Although the "down" platform was removed in 1950, steps from Arbor Road led here. In 1885, the booking office was extended to the west to provide a goods office, this time in concrete, mined from the local granite company. A station master's house was provided in 1892, built on the west side of Station Road. The platforms were faced in local granite and extended in 1904 and again in 1922. The station was a popular entry into the LNWR gardens competition, but was demolished following the station's closure. The Station Masters house and cottages remain after suffragettes set fire to the station in 1914.

Preceding station	National Rail	Following station
Hinckley	CrossCountry Birmingham-Leicester	South Wigston
Hinckley	CrossCountry Birmingham-Leicester	Leicester
	Historical railways	
Narborough; Line open, station open	LNWR; South Leicestershire Railway	Elmesthorpe; Line open, station closed
