= South Wigston =

Village in Leicestershire, England

Coordinates: 52.580°N 1.133°W

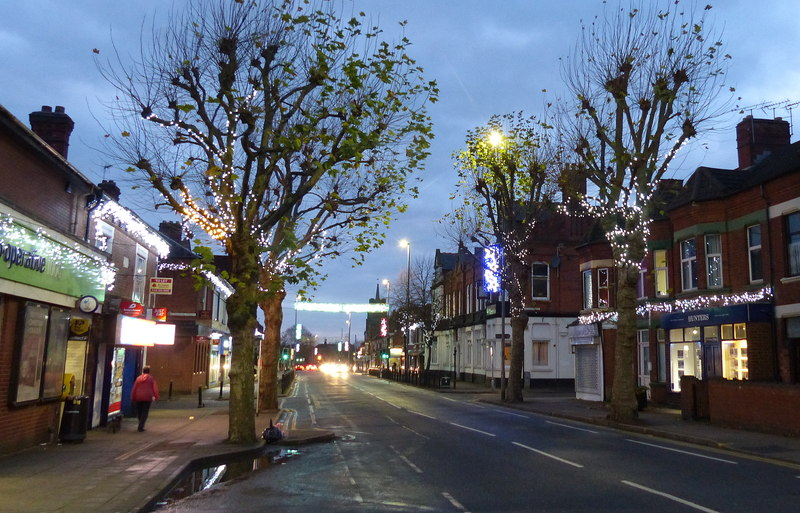
- Blaby Road, South Wigston in 2017

- Location within Leicestershire
- Population: 7,471 (2001 Census)
- OS grid reference: SP5898
  - London: 85.55 mi (137.68 km)
- Civil parish: Oadby and Wigston, unparished area
- District: Oadby and Wigston
- Shire county: Leicestershire
- Region: East Midlands
- Country: England
- Sovereign state: United Kingdom
- Post town: WIGSTON
- Postcode district: LE18
- Dialling code: 0116
- Police: Leicestershire
- Fire: Leicestershire
- Ambulance: East Midlands
- UK Parliament: Harborough, Oadby and Wigston
- Website: Oadby & Wigston Borough Council

South Wigston is a large village to the south of Leicester, England. It is outside the city boundary, forming part of the Oadby and Wigston district of Leicestershire. The population at the 2011 census was 7,490.

== Geography and administration ==
South Wigston is west of Wigston Magna, specifically west of the Midland Main Line. The Crow Mills area has been the site of a grain mill since the 13th century, though the present mill (now a private house) was built later on the original footings. The mill is on the north bank of the River Sence and backs onto the nearby Grand Union Canal, which generally forms the southern boundary of South Wigston. The first major development of the area came with the arrival of the Midland Counties Railway's Wigston South station, the Midland Railway's Wigston Junction, goods yard and Wigston Magna station and the South Leicestershire Railway's Glen Parva station. Industrial and residential buildings were built in the triangle of land between the then Wigston junction to Rugby line to the east, the Wigston to Nuneaton line (Leicester to Hinckley) to the north and Saffron Road to the west. Notable buildings in the area include the Wesleyan Methodist Church (1886), church of Saint Thomas the Apostle (1893), Congregational Church (1897), Primitive Methodist Church (1900, demolished, now Best Close), the Clarence Hotel (1890, now the Marquis of Queensbury Public House), and the Grand Hotel (circa 1880s, now converted into residential apartments having been unoccupied from 2011 to 2014, incorporates the former Venetia House). Much of the building work (including both hotels and his former home Venetia House) was commissioned by Orson Wright (circa 1880s).

The land enclosed by the Grand Union Canal, Midland Main Line and former Wigston to Rugby line started to be developed around Lansdowne Grove at the start of the twentieth century with town houses becoming a conservation area in the late 1980s early 1990s, and later a sizeable council estate, industrial estate and in the 1990s another large housing estate.

== History ==
Before the establishment of South Wigston in 1883, the area was largely open fields. The Leicestershire and Northamptonshire Union Canal, which runs south of the township, was built 1793–1809, and a house stood by the Countesthorpe Road near the bridges over the river and canal. In 1840 the Midland Counties Railway was built between Leicester and Rugby; it ran to the east of where Canal Street stands today. North of Kirkdale Road, the Midland Railway built the south chord of Wigston Junction in 1872.

To the east of the Countesthorpe Road and Canal Street junction was Crow Mill, a post mill, which is recorded on the County Sites and Monuments Register as a medieval windmill. The mill is shown as disused on the 1886 Ordnance Survey Map, though it had gone by the second edition of the map in 1914.

Ordnance Survey (1887)

The town of South Wigston was developed in the late 19th century by the owner of a large brickworks, Orson Wright. The settlement follows the tradition of establishing 'model' towns set by Victorian philanthropists at places such as New Lanark and Saltaire and continued in towns such as Bournville and Port Sunlight. Unlike the majority of these other towns however, South Wigston was not just intended to house workers in the brickyard. Other commercial premises, particularly associated with the clothing industry, were established from the start.

Like other model settlements such as Saltaire, the street pattern is generally a grid and most of the housing is in terraces. Most of the houses are of similar type (though some were slightly bigger and had front gardens) with just a few larger houses on Orange Street, Blaby Road (until many were converted to shops) and particularly Saffron Road built to house more affluent residents. The clear provision of different sizes and standards of housing to suit different classes of occupiers is not so great as in many model towns.

Although there are differences of detailing between the terraces and groups of houses, the area has a very strong character. The buildings were seemingly all built using bricks from Orson Wright's Wigston Junction Brick Works. The majority of traditional buildings are therefore of red brick with a colour range towards orange and purple, with a few houses of gault brick or with such brick used as detailing.

In terms of town planning, Blaby Road was the main cross route and was lined by many of the shops and public buildings. Canal Street was the home of most of the industrial and manufacturing concerns and had shops on some street corners and some public buildings especially at the north end. Countesthorpe Road had some industrial uses and public buildings. The schools were all off Bassett Street, whilst housing was generally sited on east–west-orientated streets south of Blaby Road and north–south-running streets north of Blaby Road.

The 1886 Ordnance Survey Map shows the beginnings of the settlement. The brickworks are the largest single premises west of Saffron Road. Blaby Road is the most developed road with three terraces of properties along the south side; one of 25 properties to the east of Countesthorpe Road, one of 18 to the east of Dunton Street and a smaller terrace from the corner of Canal Street to the level crossing and South Wigston station. On the north side of Blaby Road, the only buildings were four terraced properties to the west of Station Street.

Other buildings completed by 1886 included houses on the west side of Glen Gate and Station Street. South of Blaby Road, there was a long row of small cottages on the west side of Countesthorpe Road and a block on the north east end of Timber Street. To the north was a large factory called the Perseverance Works. The line of much of Canal Street, together with the streets north of Timber Street had been laid out, whilst north of Blaby Road two tracks existed though seemingly they were relocated to later become Fairfield and Leopold Streets.

The Duke of Clarence Hotel (c.1903)

The Duke Of Clarence Hotel was on Blaby Road; this was very much the centre of South Wigston's social life for the first 50 years of the new township. The musical artist Gertie Gitana performed at the Clarence Ballroom, and one of its rooms was named after her.

Development continued apace in the next few years and by 1893, many new houses had been built along the streets off Canal Street with some larger houses on Orange Street. Blaby Road continued to be developed for houses, shops and some public buildings as well as the site of Orson Wright's own house, Ashbourne, on the corner of Glen Gate. St Thomas' parish church was built (minus the tower) in 1893 to supersede a tin tabernacle that continued in service as the Sunday school until it was replaced in the late 1920s. North of Blaby Road, terraces were built on Leopold Street, Fairfield Street and Glen Gate.

Ordnance Survey (1904)

The settlement developed very quickly and was largely complete by the time Orson Wright died in 1913. Thereafter the main development was the provision of council housing on the undeveloped sites. Some of this was in terraces, the rest in more typical semi detached forms.

Ordnance Survey (1931)

By 1914 over 600 houses together with more factories, shops, churches and schools had been built. Despite this, vacant lots (or 'greens' as they were popularly known) were a feature of most of the streets in the town and were used as informal play areas. In the late 1920s many of these were built on to provide terraced council houses on Kirkdale Road and some of the surrounding streets with semi-detached houses on several other streets.

Ordnance Survey (1938)

A park was formed beyond the eastern railway line in 1929. The brick works ceased production in the early 1930s, though there were still a number of major employers in the area including Toon and Black's footwear factory on Saffron Road and Morrison, manufacturers of electric vehicles, who took over Brunswick Mills between Garden and Irlam Streets in the 1930s.

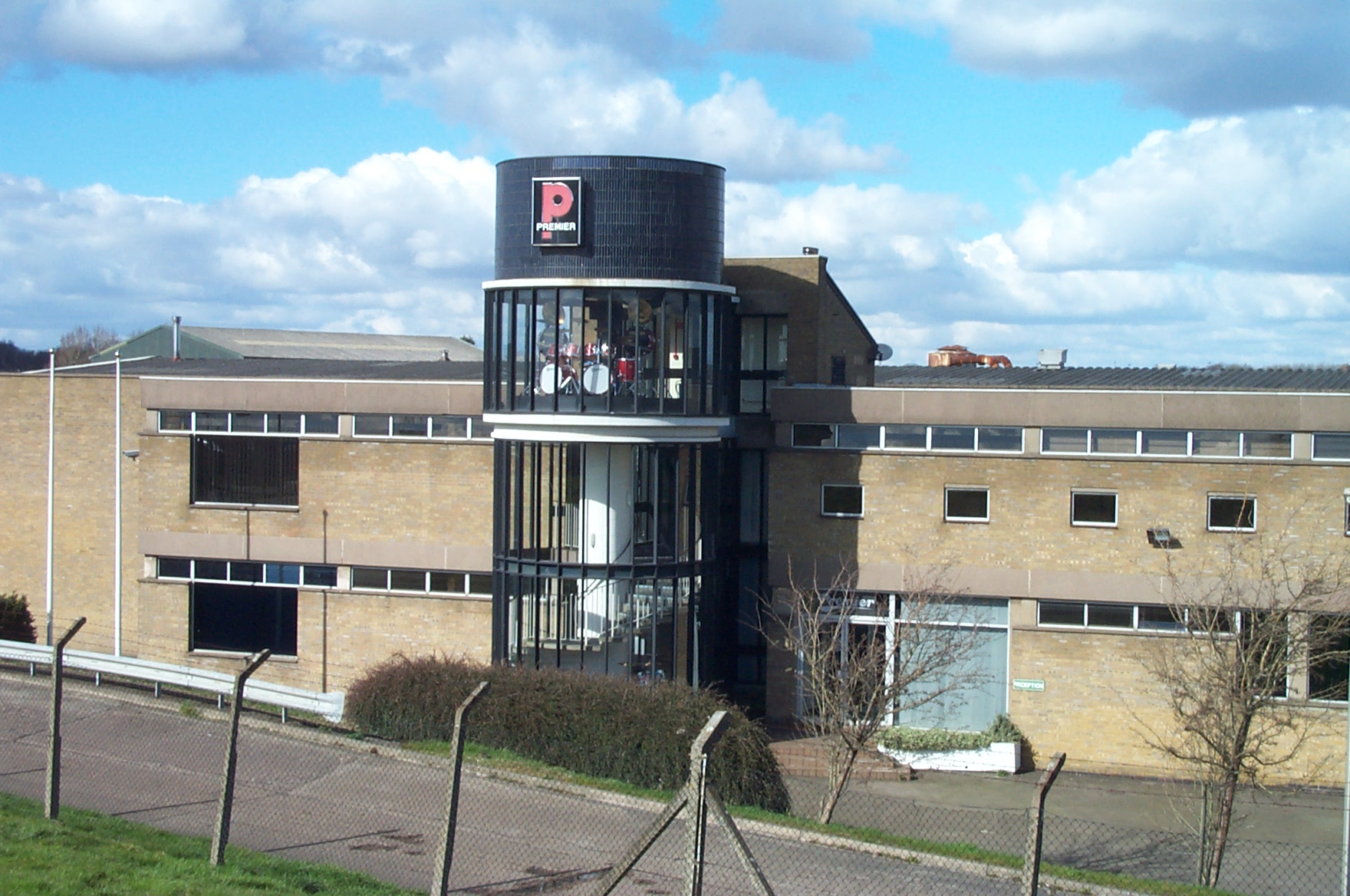
Premier Percussion (2005)

Previous owners of the large factory between the southern end of Canal Street and the former Leicester – Rugby railway line were Dunmores Biscuits whose large factory chimney dominated the local landscape. They were later taken over by Nabisco. Further up towards Blaby Road north of the Grand Hotel was Atkinson's hosiery factory which was a major employer in the area for some years after the war as was Dunmores. In Irlam Street opposite the biscuit factory was Morrison Electricars who used to make electrically powered vehicles such as milk floats. Other notable businesses who were in South Wigston were Premier Percussion, Constone (concrete pipe makers) at Saffron Lane and Marshall's Coal who were in the yard opposite Blaby Road Park.

In the later 20th century Orson Wright's house was demolished and replaced by shops, two of the schools off Bassett Street were demolished, Toon and Black's factory redeveloped and the majority of the block between Irlam and Garden Streets was redeveloped for housing in 2004 to 2005. The biscuit factory on Canal Street has expanded but many of the old industrial concerns, large and small, are now empty or underused.

St Thomas the Apostle parish church is a red brick Gothic Revival building designed by Stockdale Harrison and Sons. Notable local clergy include Bishop Robin Woods, who was Vicar from 1946 to 1951. St. Thomas's has a strong musical tradition and maintains a 40-strong choir of men and boys.

South Leicestershire College (formally known as Wigston College of Further Education) relocated from its original location on Station Road, Wigston to Blaby Road, South Wigston in 2010. South Leicestershire College then merged with North Warwickshire and Hinckley College in 2017 to be known today as North Warwickshire and South Leicestershire College.

In the late 1950s, Norbert Elias—then lecturer or reader in sociology at the University of Leicester and his student John Scotson conducted research on the tensions between two working-class neighbourhoods in South Wigston, which they dubbed "Winston Parva." Their report, The Established and the Outsiders: A Sociological Enquiry into Community Problems first published in 1965 is now regarded a classic sociological text.

== Transport ==
British Railways closed all three railway stations in the 1960s, A new South Wigston railway station was opened along the Nuneaton line in 1986 and is served by CrossCountry trains between Leicester and Birmingham New Street.

Arriva Midlands provide services 44/44S, 47/48, 85 and 87 around the South Wigston area connecting it to Countesthorpe, Blaby, Wigston, Saffron Lane, Eyres Monsell, Fosse Park, Aylestone, Clarendon Park, Leicester Royal Infirmary and Leicester City Centre.

Centrebus also operate service LC17 from Wigston Magna to Thorpe Astley & Meridian Leisure Park via Little Glen Road, Gilmorton estate and Fosse Park.

Arriva and their predecessors Midland Red were based at a depot on Station Street but Arriva announced during August 2021, they would be vacating the site with operations moving to Thurmaston depot. All operations were transferred to Thurmaston depot in October 2021 with National Express Transport Solutions taking over the depot site in 2023.
