= Welford Road =

Welford Road may refer to:

- Welford Road Cemetery, Leicester, England
- Welford Road Stadium, a rugby union stadium in Leicester, England
- Welford Road railway station, a former railway station (until 1918) in Leicester, England
