= Elmesthorpe =

Village in Leicestershire, England

Coordinates: 52.564°N 1.321°W

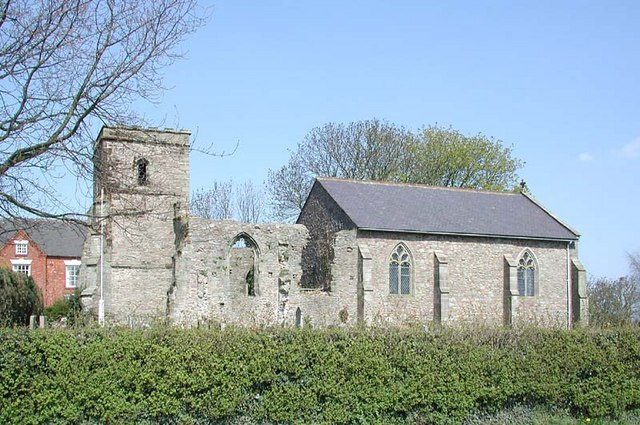
- The partially ruined St Mary's Church, Elmesthorpe

- Location within Leicestershire
- Population: 509 (2011)
- OS grid reference: SP4696
- Civil parish: Elmesthorpe
- District: Blaby
- Shire county: Leicestershire
- Region: East Midlands
- Country: England
- Sovereign state: United Kingdom
- Post town: Leicester
- Postcode district: LE9
- Dialling code: 01455
- Police: Leicestershire
- Fire: Leicestershire
- Ambulance: East Midlands
- UK Parliament: South Leicestershire

Elmesthorpe (sometimes spelt Elmersthorpe, Elmsthorpe or Aylmersthorpe) is a village and civil parish in the Blaby district of Leicestershire, England. It is situated to the south-east of Earl Shilton, near to Hinckley on the A47 road. In 2004, the parish had an estimated population of 520, reducing to 509 at the 2011 census.

== History ==
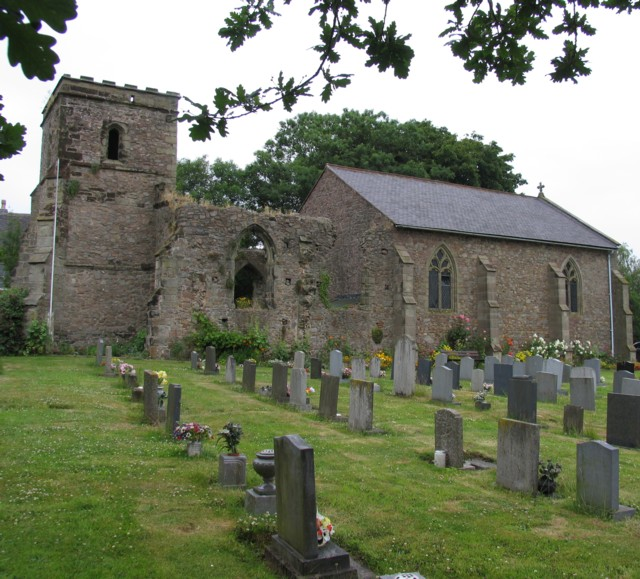
St Mary's Church Elmesthorpe, showing the ruined and restored halves

The village's name means 'outlying farm/settlement of Æthelmaer or Ailmer'.

The village has been inhabited from at least Roman times as there is evidence of Roman occupation within the parish.

In 1297, Elmesthorpe was home to numerous farms and 40-50 families. The Black Death and a failing economy caused the village to depopulate and for a time disappear.

In 1485, it is thought King Richard III and his troops stayed in the partially ruined church for shelter on their march from Leicester to the Battle of Bosworth; with the king and his officers sheltering within the church, and the soldiers camping outside.

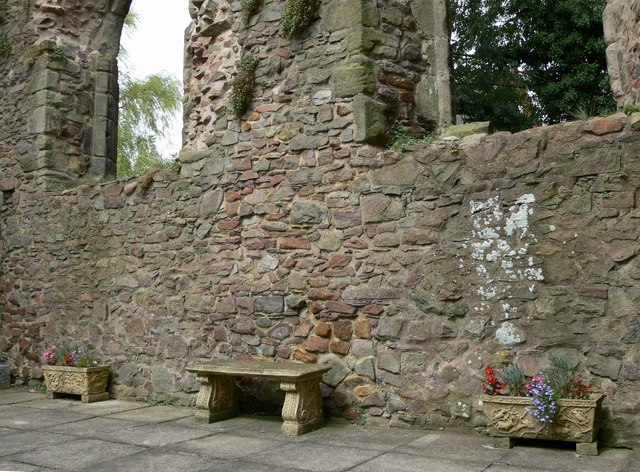
Inside the ruined section of Elmesthorpe Church

The parish church is dedicated to Saint Mary and was built in the 13th century. It had "long been in ruins" by the mid 19th century, but the tower was still standing. In 1869 the church was partially rebuilt, in a smaller scale, within the ruins of the church. This, the present church, occupies the east-end of the church and is accessed through the Tower and west end of the church, which have been left as ruins.

The village's population had begun a slow recovery by 1710, at which point 40 people were recorded as living in the village.
In 1863 Elmesthorpe gained its own railway station on the South Leicestershire Railway. The "new village" grew up around this station; starting with workers' cottages and an inn built by The Earl of Lovelace, with designs by architect C.F.A. Voysey.

In 1871, The Imperial Gazetteer of England and Wales described Elmsthorpe as:

"...a parish in Hinckley district, Leicester; on the Leicester and Nuneaton railway, 3 miles NE by E of Hinckley. It has a station on the railway; and its post town is Hinckley. Acres, 1,650. Real property, £1,446. Pop., 45. Houses, 5. The living is a rectory, united with the p. curacy of Earl-Shilton, in the diocese of Peterborough. The church was used as the headquarters of Richard's army previous to the battle of Bosworth; and is now in ruins."

In the 1920s a boot and shoe manufacturers opened in the village, called "Harvey, Harvey & Company".

In the 1930s, the government started to address the population of Elmesthorpe, which had not recovered from its collapse in the 13th century. The government initiated a scheme which brought families from depressed areas to make a living from the land. In 1935 Church Farm was purchased by the Land Settlement Association, who built 43 smallholdings in the village. This continued to the 1960s, when the scheme ended. Many of the smallholdings were then purchased by their tenants.

The 1960s saw both the railway station (in 1968) and the shoe factory close.
