= Bagnall fireless locomotives (preserved) =

Six of the only 14 Bagnall fireless locomotives built by W. G. Bagnall of Stafford, England, have been preserved. Brief histories of them are given in this article and they are listed by works number. All are standard gauge 0-4-0s except where otherwise stated.

== 2216 ==
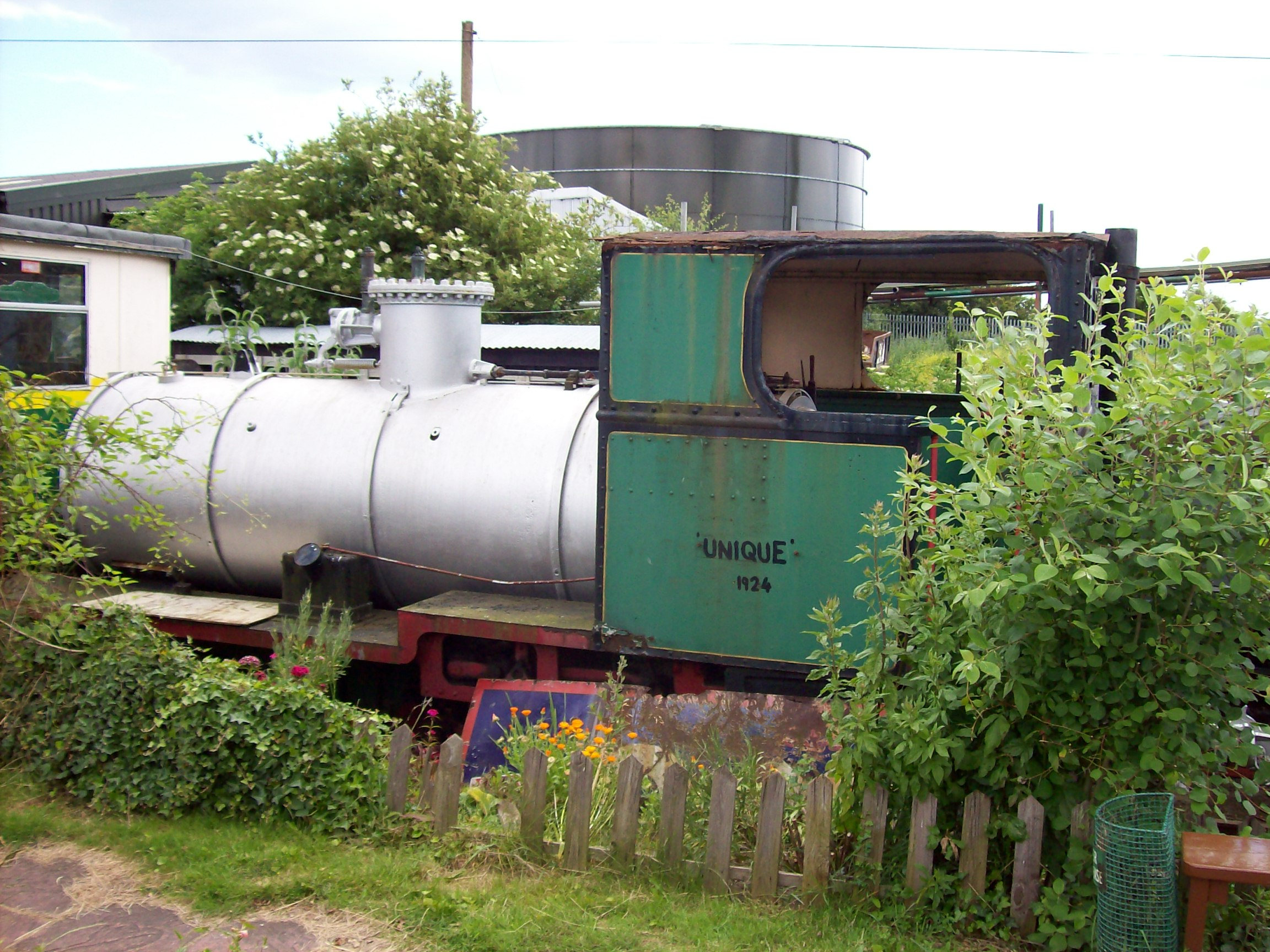
2216 "Unique" at the SKLR

This unusual 2 ft 6 in (762 mm) gauge 2-4-0, named "Unique", is the first fireless locomotive built by Bagnall. It was ordered by Edward Lloyd Ltd in February 1923 and delivered to their paper mills at Sittingbourne, Kent in February 1924.

During its operational life, the steam reservoir was charged to 220 psi (15 bar) from a charging plant at Kemsley, and a pressure reducing valve admitted steam to the cylinders at 80 psi (5.5 bar). It was capable of working for 8 hours on one charge, although was rarely used for more than 4 hours at a time. It remained the most powerful engine on the site until the 0-4-4-0T Monarch was delivered in 1953. It continued in use until the closure of the former Lloyd's system, and was acquired by the Sittingbourne and Kemsley Light Railway. It is now preserved, but has not worked in preservation, as there is no longer a source of high-pressure steam available to charge it.

== 2370 ==
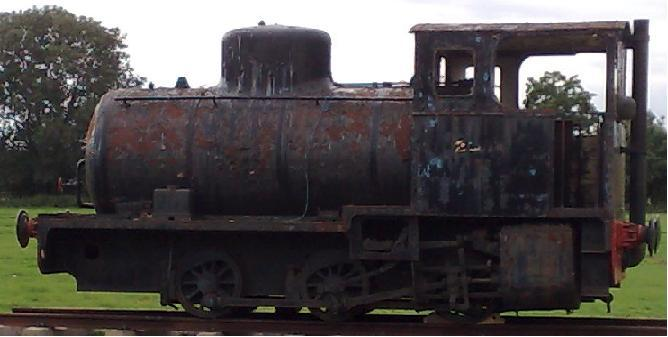
Bagnall 2370 of 1929, in a field near Leicester

Number 2370 is a 0-6-0 ordered in December 1928 by the Distillers Company and delivered to their Salt End Works, Kingston upon Hull, in May 1929. After working at Procter & Gamble, soap manufacturers, at West Thurrock, Essex, it moved in late 1979 to the North Norfolk Railway, where it went on static display at Sheringham railway station (North Norfolk Railway) for a number of years before moving (circa 2004) to a private site at Holt Farm, Broughton Astley, Leicestershire. In September 2008, it moved four miles to Blaby, Leicestershire, where it is plinthed in a field alongside the Leicester-Birmingham railway line and is being used, now in a semi-derelict and unmaintained manner, to publicise a campaign to re-open Blaby railway station.

== 2473 ==
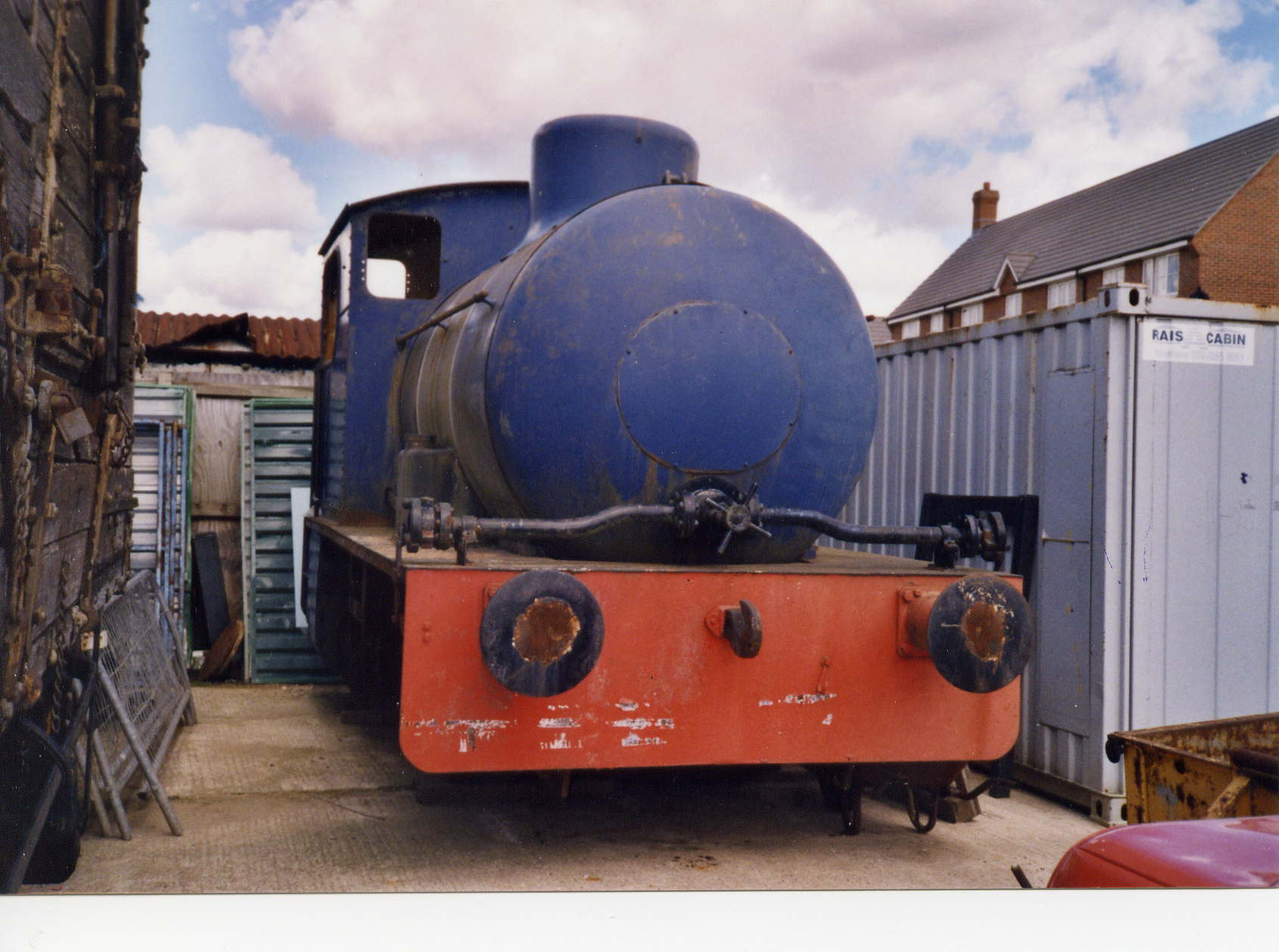
"Huntley & Palmers No.1" on the Cholsey & Wallingford Railway in 2005

Ordered in May 1932 by Huntley & Palmers, biscuit manufacturers, of Reading, Berkshire. It was delivered later in 1932 as "Huntley & Palmers No.1". A second locomotive "Huntley & Palmers No.2" (works no. 2474) was ordered and delivered in the same year.

The factory's railway system closed in 1969 and No.2 was scrapped in March 1970. No.1 was sold in May 1970 and moved to the Great Western Society's Didcot Railway Centre. A private owner later moved it to the West Somerset Railway.

In 2003, Jane Griffiths (who was Member of Parliament for Reading East at the time) discovered the locomotive and mounted a campaign to return it to Reading. The locomotive was re-located to the Cholsey and Wallingford Railway where it remained until 12 March 2009, when it was moved to a site in Kent. It was then sold (through a dealer) to a new owner in East Bierley, near Bradford, West Yorkshire.

== 2898 ==
Ordered in January 1947 by Paton & Baldwins, wool spinners, and delivered to their new factory in Darlington in 1948. It was overhauled by Robert Stephenson and Hawthorns in the late 1950s.

It is now preserved at Darlington Railway Centre and Museum.

== 3019 ==
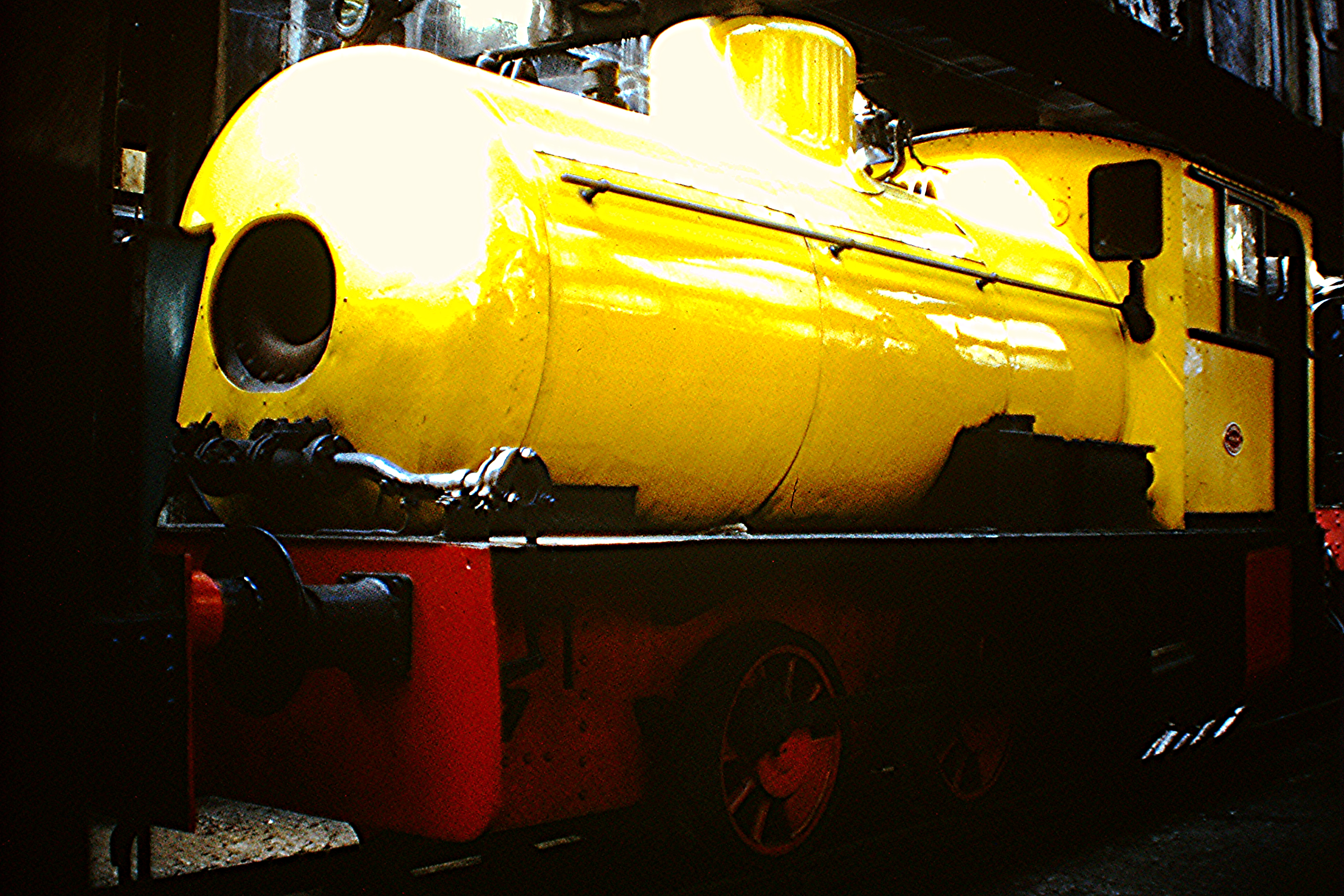
Bagnall 3019 at Carnforth

This is a 0-6-0 ordered in September 1949 by Shell Refining and Marketing Co. Ltd. It was delivered in May 1952 to Trimpell Ltd. (a subsidiary company) of Heysham, Lancashire and numbered 5. This locomotive is notable in being designed for the unusually high reservoir pressure of 300 psi (21 bar).

It was sold in November 1970 to Lakeside Railway Estates Co. Ltd. and put in their museum in the former British Railways motive power depot at Carnforth. It was later moved to Shropshire. A full restoration was commenced in 2006–7 and completed in January 2011.

Restoration was completed in May 2010 by Wayne Bownes, who completed the restoration single handed.

== 3121 ==
This is the last fireless locomotive built by Bagnall. It was ordered in December 1955 by English Clays Lovering Pochin Co. Ltd. and delivered in May 1957 to their Marsh Mills Drying Works, Plympton, Devon.

It is now in the care of the Cornish Steam Locomotive Preservation Society and stored at the Bodmin and Wenford Railway.

== See also ==
- List of fireless steam locomotives preserved in Britain

== Sources ==
- Baker, A. and Civil, A. Fireless Locomotives, Oakwood Press, 1976, ISBN 0-85361-193-9
