= Blaby railway station =

Former railway station in Leicestershire, England

Blaby
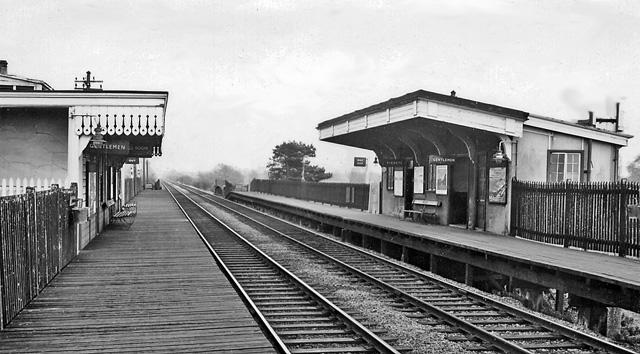

General information
- Location: Blaby, Leicestershire; England
- Coordinates: 52.5787°N 1.1662°W
- Grid reference: SP566982
- Platforms: 2

Other information
- Status: Disused

History
- Original company: South Leicestershire Railway
- Pre-grouping: London and North Western Railway
- Post-grouping: London Midland and Scottish Railway

Key dates
- 1 January 1864: Station opened
- 4 March 1968: Station closed
Location

Blaby railway station was a railway station on the Birmingham to Peterborough Line that served Blaby in Leicestershire, England.

The station was opened in 1864 by the South Leicestershire Railway, which was taken over by the London and North Western Railway in 1867. British Railways closed the station in 1968.

In July 1914, local suffragettes Ellen Sheriff and Elizabeth Frisby, along with experienced arsonist Kitty Marion, armed with wood-shavings dipped in creosol (and an axe, to break in) trekked across a field in the middle of the night and burned the station down, causing £500-worth of damage.

A campaign to re-open the station was launched in 2008. Preserved Bagnall fireless steam locomotive no. 2370 is being used to publicise the re-opening campaign.

Preceding station	Historical railways	Following station
Narborough; Line and station open	London and North Western Railway; South Leicestershire Railway	Wigston Glen Parva; Line open, station closed
