= Narborough railway station =

Railway station in Leicestershire, England

Narborough
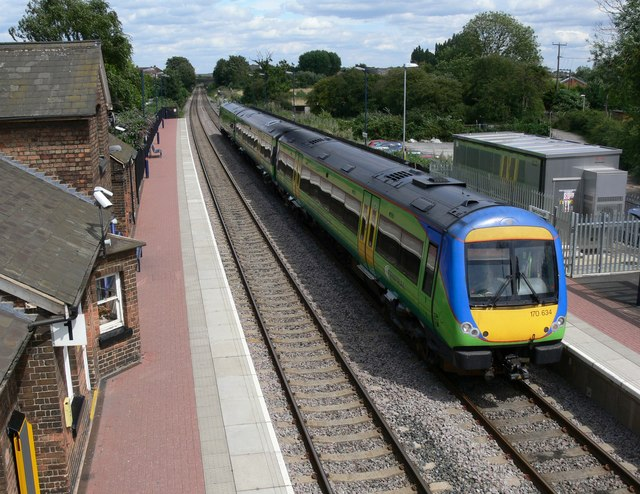
- Narborough railway station

General information
- Location: Narborough, Blaby; England
- Coordinates: 52.5708°N 1.2032°W
- Grid reference: SP541973
- Managed by: East Midlands Railway
- Platforms: 2

Other information
- Station code: NBR
- Classification: DfT category E

History
- Original company: South Leicestershire Railway
- Pre-grouping: London and North Western Railway
- Post-grouping: London, Midland and Scottish Railway

Key dates
- 1864: Opened
- 4 March 1968: Closed
- 5 January 1970: Reopened

Passengers
- 2020/21: ▼56,744
- 2021/22: ▲0.172 million
- 2022/23: ▲0.208 million
- 2023/24: ▲0.240 million
- 2024/25: ▲0.294 million
Location
Notes
- Passenger statistics from the Office of Rail and Road

Narborough railway station serves the large village of Narborough and the small village of Littlethorpe in Leicestershire. It is on the Birmingham to Peterborough Line about 7 miles (11 km) southwest of Leicester. The station is owned by Network Rail and managed by East Midlands Railway, who do not serve the station. Only CrossCountry trains serve the station.

A full range of tickets for travel is available from the station ticket office, which is open from 0640 to 1300 Mondays to Saturdays, or at other times from the guard on the train at no extra cost.

== History ==
The station was opened in 1864 by the South Leicestershire Railway, which was taken over by the London and North Western Railway in 1867.

British Railways closed the station on 4 March 1968, but public objections led BR to reopen it on 5 January 1970. Restoration of the station after 21 months of disuse cost £3,250, which was paid for by the then Blaby Rural District Council and Narborough Parish Council.

Next to the station is a level crossing across Station Road.

== Services ==
CrossCountry services call regularly at Narborough as part of its Birmingham New Street to Leicester service: usually one train in each direction every hour (including Sundays).

A few services are extended beyond Leicester and additional services call at peak times on weekdays only. These are operated using CrossCountry's Birmingham New Street to Cambridge/Stansted Airport services, most of which pass through Narborough without stopping.

This station has a waiting room, which is open for the same hours as the booking office.

Preceding station	National Rail	Following station
Hinckley	CrossCountry Birmingham-Leicester	South Wigston
Hinckley	CrossCountry Birmingham-Leicester	Leicester
	Historical railways	
Croft; Line open, station closed	LNWR; South Leicestershire Railway	Blaby; Line open, station closed
