= Hinckley railway station =

Railway station in Leicestershire, England

Hinckley
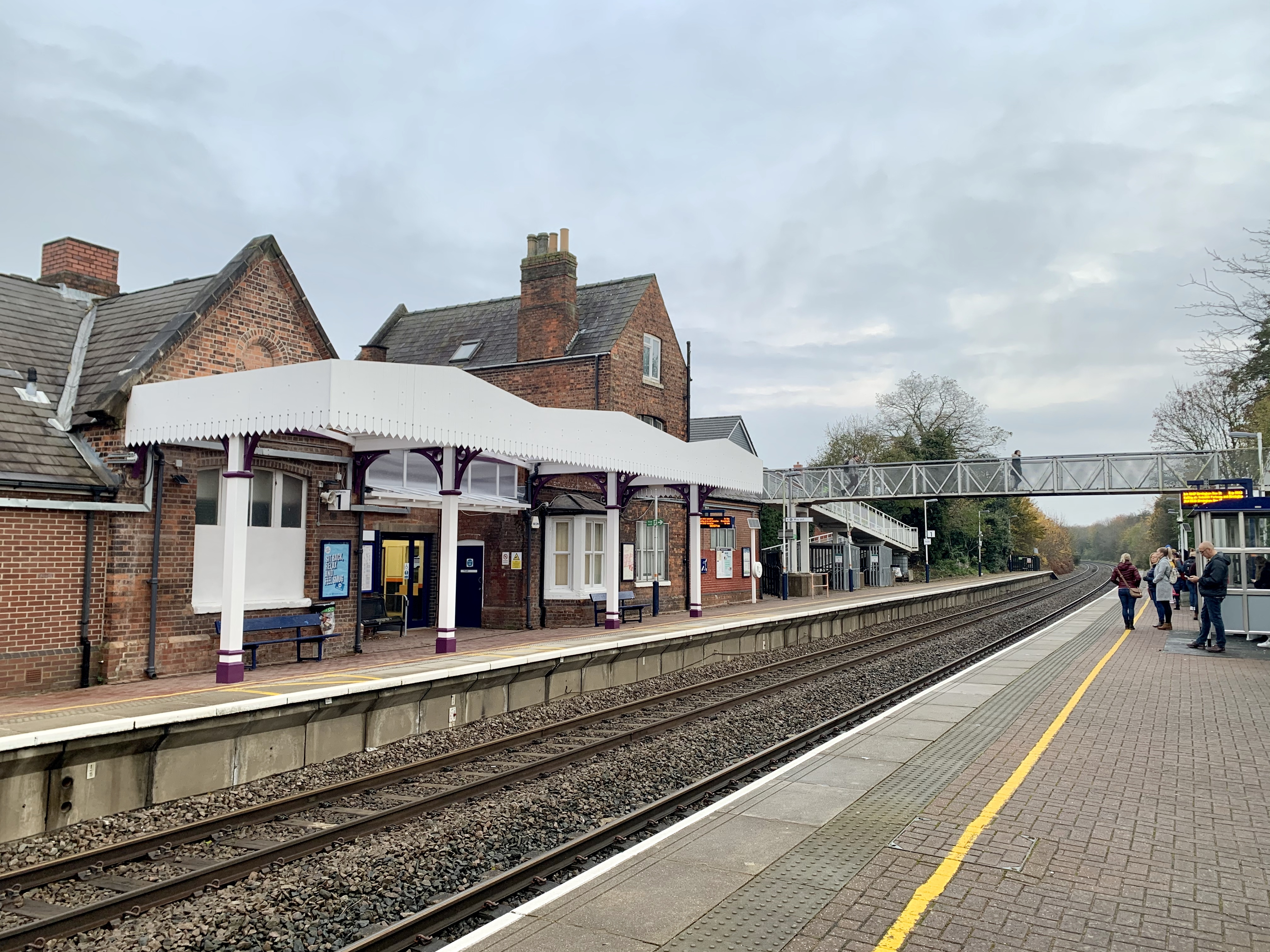
- Hinckley railway station in 2019.

General information
- Location: Hinckley, Hinckley and Bosworth; England
- Coordinates: 52.5350°N 1.3719°W
- Grid reference: SP427932
- Managed by: East Midlands Railway
- Platforms: 2

Other information
- Station code: HNK
- Classification: DfT category E

History
- Original company: South Leicestershire Railway
- Pre-grouping: London and North Western Railway
- Post-grouping: London, Midland and Scottish Railway

Key dates
- 1861: Opened

Passengers
- 2020/21: ▼54,204
- 2021/22: ▲0.198 million
- 2022/23: ▲0.235 million
- 2023/24: ▲0.302 million
- 2024/25: ▲0.378 million
Location
Notes
- Passenger statistics from the Office of Rail and Road

Hinckley railway station serves the town of Hinckley and village of Burbage in Leicestershire, England.

The station is on the CrossCountry Birmingham to Peterborough Line between Leicester and Birmingham New Street and is about 4 miles (6 km) east of Nuneaton.

The station is owned by Network Rail and managed by East Midlands Railway, who do not operate services from this station. Only CrossCountry operate trains from here.

A full range of tickets for travel is available from the station ticket office when it is open (06:40—13:00 Monday to Saturday, closed on Sundays), or at other times from either the ticket machines or the guard on the train at no extra cost.

== History ==
The station was opened in 1861 as part of the South Leicestershire Railway, which was taken over by the London and North Western Railway in 1867.

== Services ==
CrossCountry services call regularly at Hinckley as part of its Birmingham New Street to Leicester service: usually one train in each direction every hour (including Sundays).

A few services are extended beyond Leicester and additional services call at peak times on weekdays only. These are operated using CrossCountry's Birmingham New Street to Cambridge/Stansted Airport services, most of which pass through Hinckley without stopping.

This station has a waiting room, which is open for the same hours as the booking office.

Preceding station	National Rail	Following station
Nuneaton	CrossCountry Birmingham New Street - Peterborough	Narborough
	Historical railways	
Stoke Golding; Line and station closed	Ashby and Nuneaton Joint Railway	Elmesthorpe; Line open, station closed
Nuneaton Abbey Street; Line open, station closed	Midland Railway	Elmesthorpe; Line open, station closed

Buses operate from outside the station around the town and also to Magna Park and Lutterworth. The station is also just a short walk from The Crescent bus station where a large number of services can be caught to farther destinations and also smaller nearby villages.
