= South Wigston railway station =

Station in Leicestershire, England

South Wigston
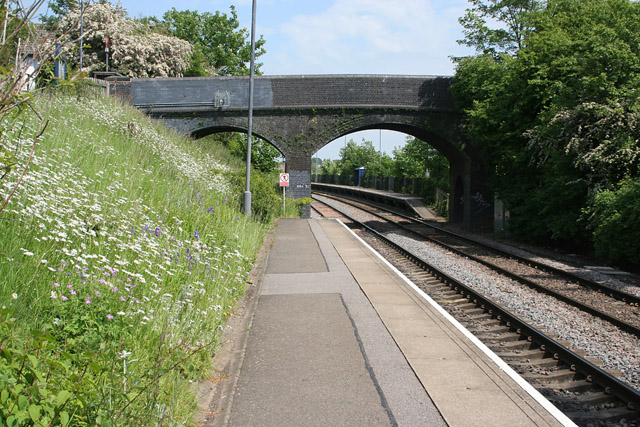
- South Wigston railway station in 2006.

General information
- Location: South Wigston, Borough of Oadby and Wigston; England
- Coordinates: 52.5824°N 1.1339°W
- Grid reference: SP587986
- Managed by: East Midlands Railway
- Platforms: 2

Other information
- Station code: SWS
- Classification: DfT category F2

Key dates
- 1986: Opened

Passengers
- 2020/21: ▼20,222
- 2021/22: ▲67,430
- 2022/23: ▲90,504
- 2023/24: ▲100,480
- 2024/25: ▲133,846
Location
Notes
- Passenger statistics from the Office of Rail and Road

South Wigston railway station serves the village of South Wigston, Leicestershire, England, on the Birmingham to Peterborough Line 4 miles (6 km) south of Leicester and the west-north loop of Wigston Junction. It is owned by Network Rail and managed by East Midlands Railway (EMR). Not all trains operating between Birmingham and Leicester stop here. Although the station is only served by CrossCountry, it is managed by East Midlands Railway as CrossCountry does not manage any stations.

The station is unstaffed, so passengers have to either buy their tickets for travel from the guard on the train at no extra cost or online. Facilities at the station are limited, consisting of a "bus shelter" type shelter on each of the two platforms to protect passengers from the weather, as well as a timetable board, public address system and noticeboard.

== History ==
Wigston once had three railway stations: Wigston South on the Midland Counties Railway opened in 1840 (dismantled), Wigston Magna on the Midland Main Line opened in 1857 and Glen Parva on the South Leicestershire Railway opened in the 1860s. However, British Railways closed all three stations by 1968.

The present South Wigston station was opened on Saturday 10 May 1986 and is at a new site about 300 metres, (328 feet), east of the site of the former Glen Parva station. The new station cost £135,000 to build and was funded by Leicestershire County Council.

There has been talk of a car park for commuters on the adjacent wasteland within the Wigston railway triangle, but this has never been progressed and the land remains a haven for wildlife. There is a public car park on nearby Kirkdale Road.

The station was managed by Central Trains until 2007, who operated all trains calling at the station; when the franchise ended, the station management transferred to East Midlands Trains, who managed the station until 2019, when their franchise ended, and the station was transferred to East Midlands Railway. All services calling are operated by CrossCountry.

South Wigston station's two platforms are staggered, one each side of a wide footbridge over the railway.

== Services ==
CrossCountry services usually call at South Wigston as part of its Birmingham New Street to Leicester service (including Sundays). The service provision is sporadic and focusses around morning and evening peak times, with several gaps between hourly services during the day.

A small number of services are extended beyond Leicester and additional services call at peak times on weekdays only. These are operated using CrossCountry's Birmingham New Street to Cambridge/Stansted Airport services, most of which pass through South Wigston without stopping.

Preceding station	National Rail	Following station
Narborough	CrossCountry Birmingham New Street — Leicester	Leicester
