= Elmesthorpe railway station =

Former railway station in Leicestershire, England

Elmesthorpe
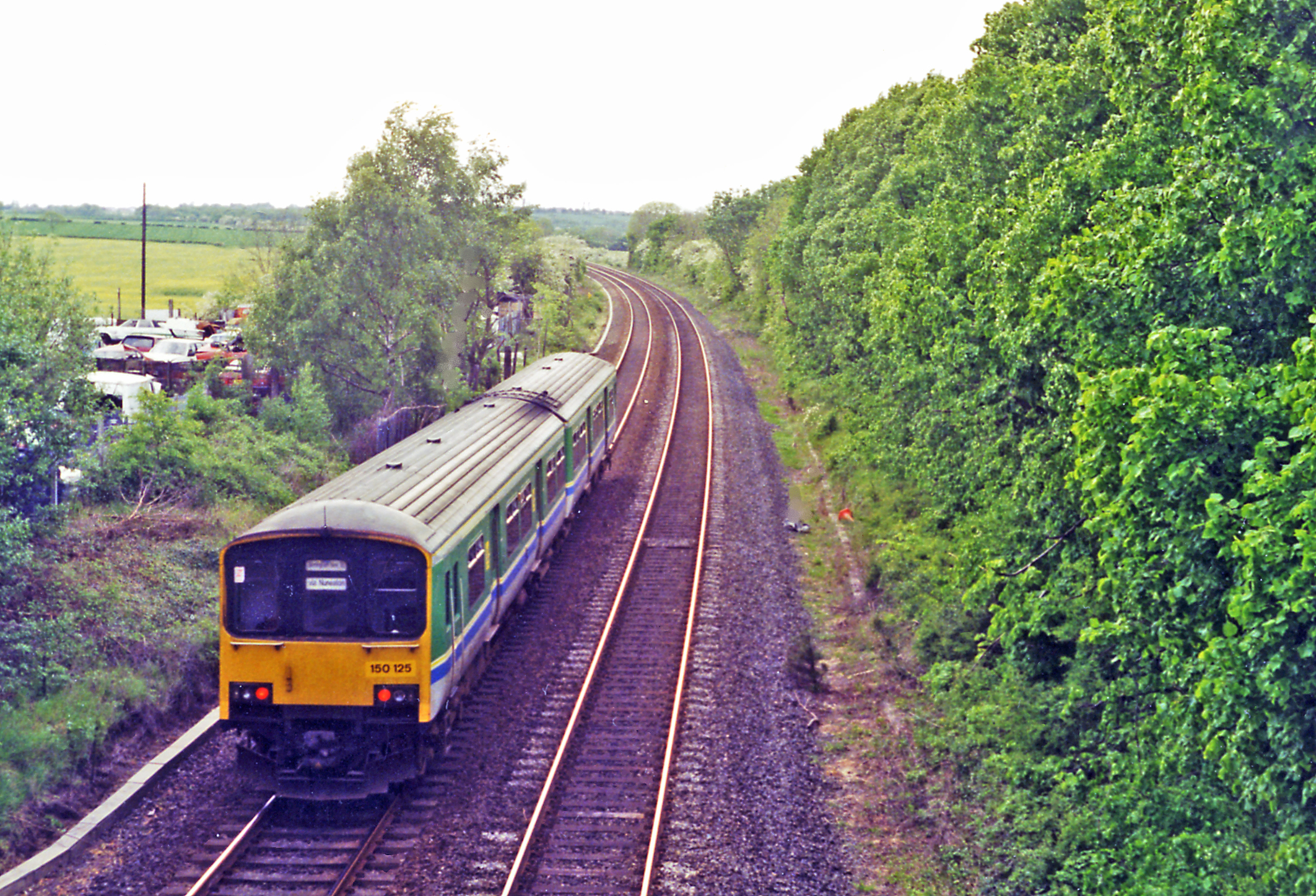
- The site of the station in 1995

General information
- Location: England
- Coordinates: 52.5584°N 1.3092°W
- Platforms: 2

Other information
- Status: Disused

History
- Original company: South Leicestershire Railway
- Pre-grouping: London and North Western Railway
- Post-grouping: London, Midland and Scottish Railway

Key dates
- 1863: Opened
- 4 March 1968: Closed
Location

Elmesthorpe was a railway station serving the village of Elmesthorpe in the Blaby district of Leicestershire, England. It was located on what is now the Birmingham to Peterborough Line and was located between Croft and Hinckley. The station was opened in 1863 and closed in 1968.
