= Wigston South railway station =

Former railway station in Leicestershire, England

Wigston South
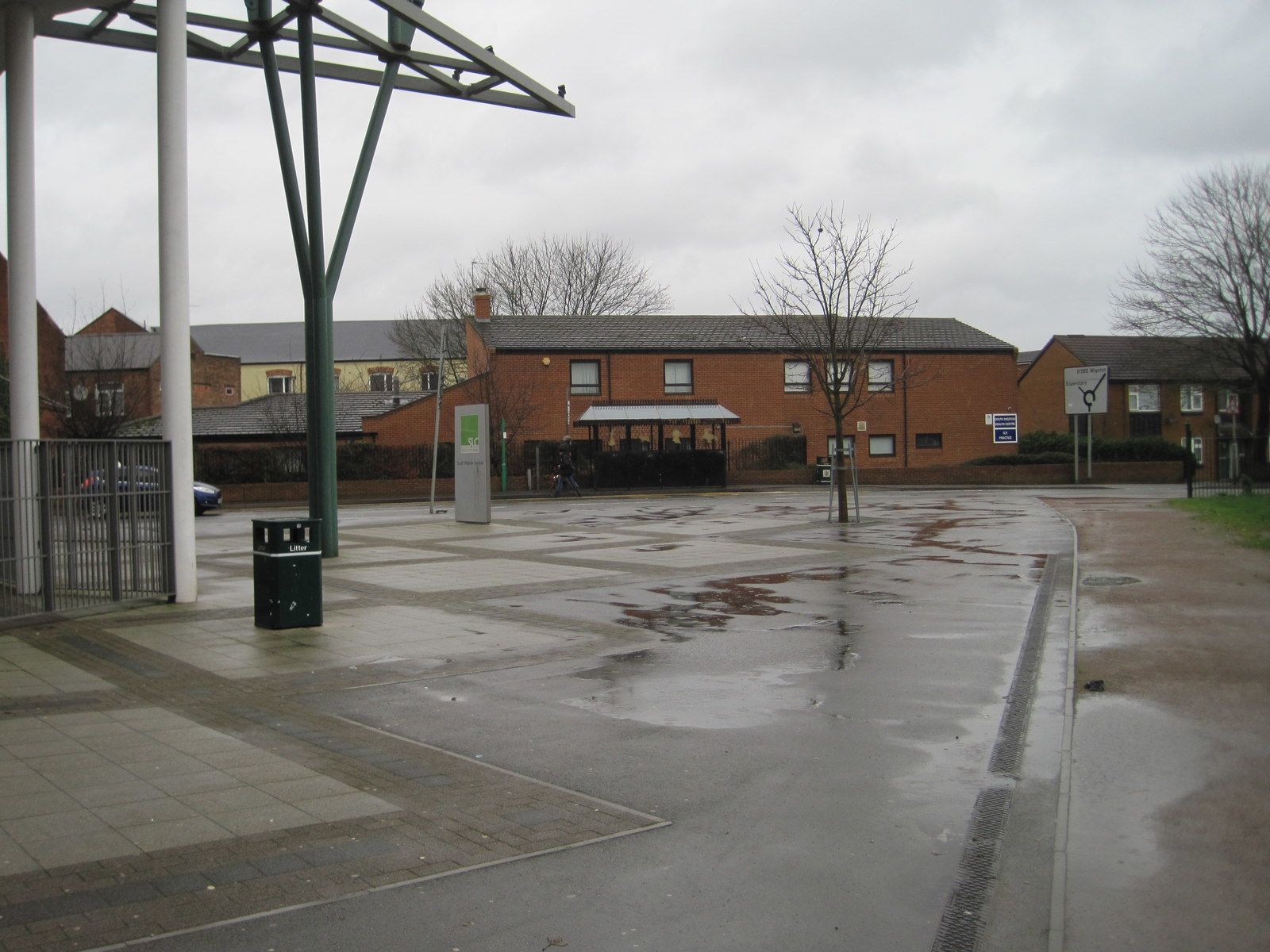
- The site of the station in 2016

General information
- Location: South Wigston, Oadby and Wigston; England
- Coordinates: 52.5793°N 1.1307°W
- Grid reference: SP590983
- Platforms: 2

Other information
- Status: Disused

History
- Original company: Midland Counties Railway
- Pre-grouping: Midland Railway
- Post-grouping: London, Midland and Scottish Railway

Key dates
- 30 June 1840: Station opened as Wigston
- 1 October 1868: Renamed Wigston South
- 1 January 1962: Station closed
Location

Wigston South railway station, originally named Wigston station, was a railway station serving Wigston Magna in Leicestershire. Following the arrival of the station and further substantial development of Wigston Junction, locomotive shed and wagon works, the area was built up to form what is now known as South Wigston.

== History ==
The station was opened on 30 June 1840 on the Midland Counties Railway main line from Derby to Rugby. In 1844 the Midland Counties joined the North Midland Railway and the Birmingham and Derby Junction Railway to form the Midland Railway.

In 1857 the Midland completed a new main line to Hitchin from a junction slightly north of Wigston, and the Leicester – Rugby section of the Midland Counties was relegated to a branch. A second Wigston railway station was opened nearby on the new main line, and on 1 October 1868 the Midland Counties station was renamed Wigston South to avoid confusion.

British Railways closed the Leicester – Rugby line and its stations, including Wigston South which closed on 1 January 1962.

== Route ==
Preceding station	Disused railways	Following station
Countesthorpe; Line and station closed	Midland Railway; Midland Counties Railway	Welford Road; Line open, station closed
