= Wigston Magna railway station =

Former railway station in Leicestershire, England

Wigston Magna
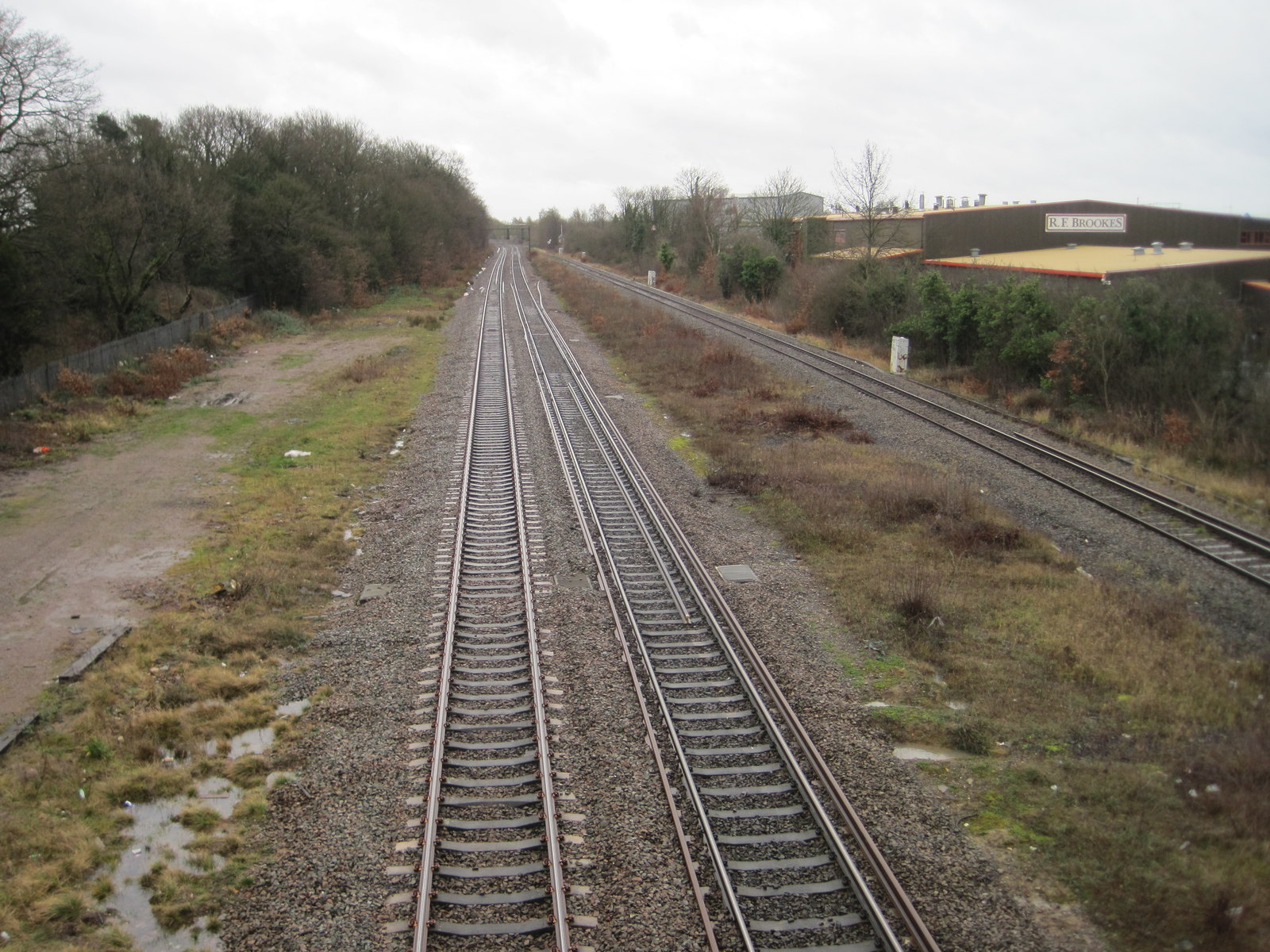
- Site of Wigston Magna railway station in 2016

General information
- Location: Wigston Magna, Borough of Oadby and Wigston; England
- Coordinates: 52.5802°N 1.1233°W
- Grid reference: SP595984
- Platforms: 2

Other information
- Status: Disused

History
- Original company: Midland Railway
- Pre-grouping: Midland Railway
- Post-grouping: London, Midland and Scottish Railway

Key dates
- 8 May 1857: Station opened as Wigston
- 1924: Renamed Wigston Magna
- 1 January 1968: Station closed
Location

Wigston Magna railway station was a railway station serving Wigston Magna in Leicestershire.

== History ==
In 1857 the Midland Railway opened its new main line to Hitchin, diverging from the Midland Counties Railway main line at a junction slightly north of its Wigston station. A new Wigston railway station was opened on the new main line, and the Midland Counties station was renamed Wigston South to reduce confusion.

In 1860 the Midland acquired running powers to Nuneaton on the South Leicestershire Railway, which was later extended to Whitacre Junction. In 1872 a south chord was added to Wigston Junction, creating a direct link between Wigston Magna and Glen Parva stations.

In its heyday Wigston was an important interchange with large sidings and wagon repair shop. A motive power depot (MPD) was added in 1873.

In the 1923 grouping the Midland became part of the London, Midland and Scottish Railway and later the second Wigston station was renamed Wigston Magna for further clarity. The London, Midland and Scottish Railway closed the MPD in 1934 but reopened it in the Second World War while Leicester MPD was being rebuilt.

British Railways closed the MPD again in 1955. By 1968 BR closed all Midland Main Line stations between Leicester and Market Harborough, including Wigston Magna.

== Route ==
Preceding station	Disused railways	Following station
Great Glen; Line open, station closed	Midland Railway; Midland Main Line	Welford Road; Line open, station closed
Great Glen; Line open, station closed	LNWR; South Leicestershire Railway	Wigston Glen Parva; Line open, station closed
