= Wigston Glen Parva railway station =

Former railway station in Leicestershire, England

Wigston Glen Parva
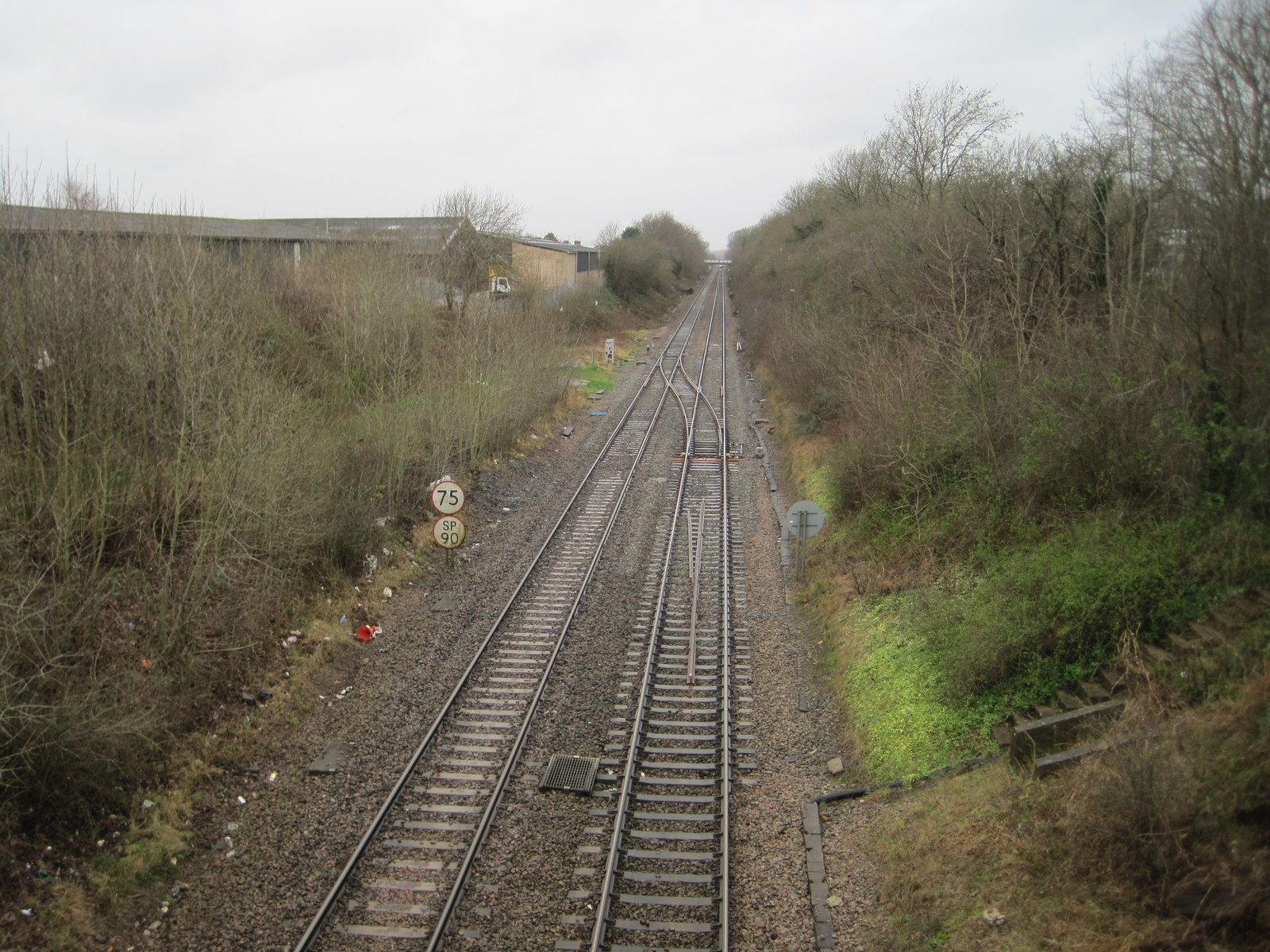
- The site of the station in 2016

General information
- Location: Glen Parva, Leicestershire; England
- Coordinates: 52.5811°N 1.1396°W
- Grid reference: SP584985
- Platforms: 2

Other information
- Status: Disused

History
- Original company: London and North Western Railway
- Pre-grouping: London and North Western Railway
- Post-grouping: London Midland and Scottish Railway

Key dates
- 1882: opened for military use only
- 1 April 1884: Station opened as Glen Parva
- 1887: Station renamed Wigston Glen Parva
- 4 March 1968: Station closed
Location

Wigston Glen Parva railway station was a railway station on the Birmingham to Peterborough Line that served Glen Parva in Leicestershire, England.

== History ==
The station was opened in 1882 for military use, and on 1 April 1884 for public use.

In 1950 the station won first prize in the London Midland Region Garden Competition.

British Rail closed the station in 1968.

In 1986 BR opened a new station on the same line, South Wigston, about 300 m (330 yd) east of the site of Glen Parva.

== Route ==
Preceding station	Historical railways	Following station
Blaby; Line open, station closed	L&NWR; South Leicestershire Railway	Welford Road; Line open, station closed
Blaby; Line open, station closed	L&NWR; South Leicestershire Railway	Wigston Magna; Line open, station closed
