= CrossCountry =

Train operating company in the United Kingdom

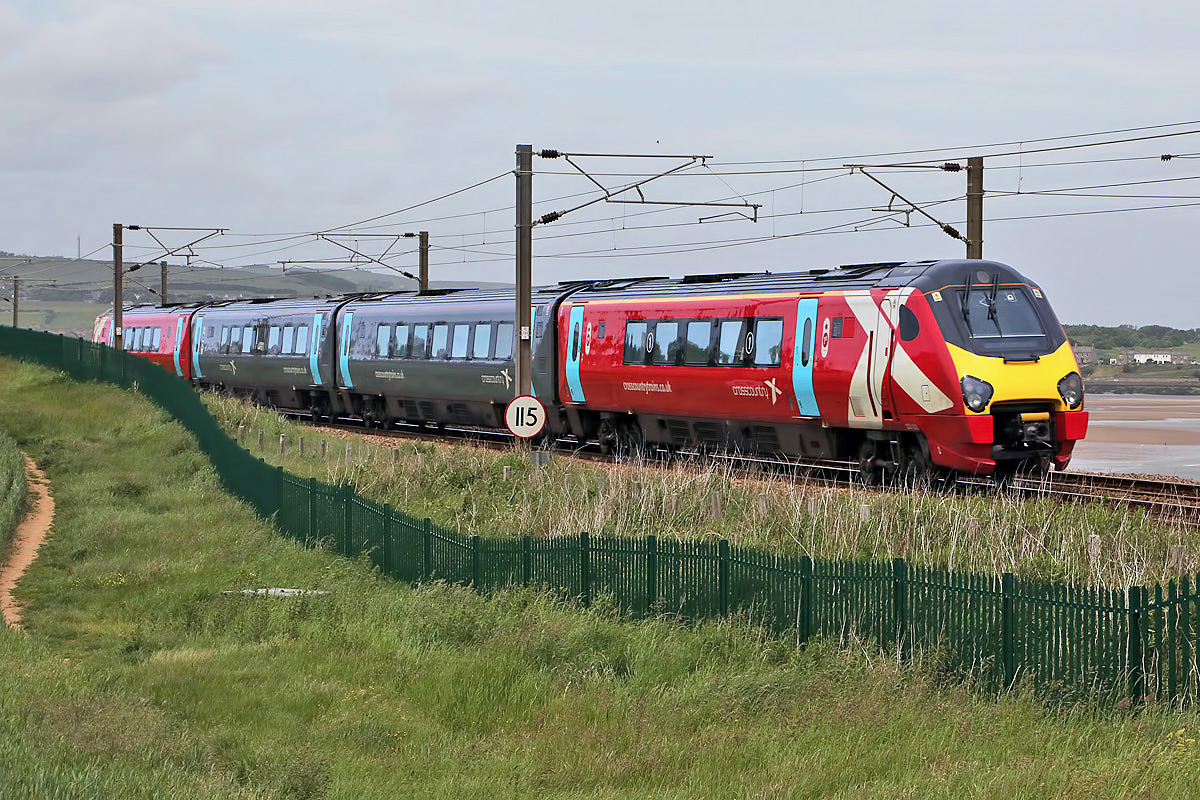
- Class 220 Voyager unit passing Spittal, outside Berwick-upon-Tweed

Overview
- Franchises: New CrossCountry; 11 November 2007 - 15 October 2027
- Main regions: East Midlands; North East England; North West England; South West England; West Midlands; Yorkshire & the Humber
- Other regions: East of England; Scotland; South East England; Wales
- Fleet: Class 170 Turbostar; Class 220 Voyager; Class 221 Super Voyager
- Stations called at: 120
- Parent company: Arriva UK Trains
- Headquarters: Birmingham
- Reporting mark: XC
- Predecessor: Virgin CrossCountry; Central Trains

Technical
- Length: 2,397.9 km (1,490.0 mi)

Other
- Website: www.crosscountrytrains.co.uk
Route map

XC Trains Limited, trading as CrossCountry, is a British train operating company owned by Arriva UK Trains, operating the current CrossCountry franchise.

The CrossCountry franchise was restructured by the Department for Transport (DfT) in 2006, incorporating elements of both the Central Trains and the Virgin CrossCountry franchises, ahead of its invitation to tender on October of that year. On 10 July 2007, the DfT announced that Arriva had been awarded the New Cross Country franchise. CrossCountry is one of only two franchised train operating companies that does not manage any stations, the other being Caledonian Sleeper. CrossCountry's services have been periodically disrupted by industrial action amongst its staff, often due to disputes over rostering and pay. While the franchise had been originally due to conclude on 31 March 2016, multiple subsequent agreements have been enacted; in September 2023, the DfT confirmed that the franchise has been extended for a further four years for a finish date of 15 October 2027.

At the commencement of operations, CrossCountry's rolling stock consisted of 34 four-car Class 220 Voyagers and 40 five-car and 4 four-car Class 221 Super Voyagers from Virgin CrossCountry as well as 11 two-car and 18 three-car Class 170 Turbostars from Central Trains. As per its franchise agreement, it obtained ten Class 43 power cars and forty Mark 3 carriages to operate on services that required greater seating capacity, while some Super Voyagers were transferred to Virgin West Coast. Overhauls of the Voyager & Super Voyager fleets were performed, the removal of the shop to fit more seating and storage being a prominent change; the Mark 3 carriages were also refurbished to provide suitable amenities for modern travellers. Both the Super Voyagers and Turbostar fleets have been extended where possible to provide more capacity.

CrossCountry's network is centred around Birmingham New Street. It operates intercity and other long-distance passenger trains across Great Britain, but does not serve Greater London. It operated the UK's longest direct rail passenger service, from Aberdeen in the north-east of Scotland to Penzance in western Cornwall, which had a journey time of 13 hours and 15 minutes. This service ended on 16 May 2025, terminating short in Plymouth instead. Some services on the West Coast Main Line were promptly discontinued with the introduction of a new timetable on 9 December 2007, with some transferring over to both Virgin Trains West Coast and to First TransPennine Express; new services, such as a daily Nottingham to Bournemouth service introduced during December 2008, were also implemented. Special services have occasionally been run, such as between Bournemouth and Weymouth in support of the Sailing at the 2012 Olympics & Paralympics.

In August 2024, the then Secretary of State for Transport, Louise Haigh, criticised the company's performance and threatened to take action if it did not improve, following its request to reduce its service levels in the new timetable.

== History ==
=== Formation ===
During June 2006, the Department for Transport (DfT) announced its intention to restructure a number of the existing railway franchises. As a result of these changes, a 'New Cross Country' franchise was produced, which incorporated the existing InterCity Cross Country franchise run by Virgin CrossCountry, while excluding those services ran on the West Coast Main Line (while the Birmingham to Scotland services were transferred to Virgin Trains West Coast and the Manchester to Scotland services transferring to First TransPennine Express). Several services from the Central Trains franchise were also to be added.

In October 2006, the DfT issued the invitation to tender (ITT) to the four shortlisted bidders: Arriva, FirstGroup, National Express and Virgin Rail Group. On 10 July 2007, the DfT announced that Arriva had been awarded the New Cross Country franchise, and that the services operated by Virgin CrossCountry would be transferred to CrossCountry on 11 November 2007, along with the Cardiff to Nottingham and Birmingham to Stansted Airport services from Central Trains.

=== Transfer and withdrawal of services ===
After taking over the franchise, CrossCountry continued to operate the existing timetable including the West Coast Main Line services for four weeks. When the new timetable commenced on 9 December 2007 on 11 November 2007, the Birmingham New Street to Edinburgh Waverley and Glasgow Central services were transferred to Virgin Trains West Coast while the Manchester Airport to Edinburgh and Glasgow services transferred to First TransPennine Express.

The ITT did not require retention of the services beyond Guildford after December 2008, so the services to both Gatwick Airport and Brighton soon ceased. As a result of these changes, all CrossCountry services now completely avoid Greater London.

=== Changes to services ===
Starting in December 2008, a daily Nottingham to Bournemouth service was introduced. From December 2010, a number of services from Newcastle were extended from Reading to Southampton Central. From May 2011, a number of services were extended from Edinburgh to Glasgow to replace East Coast services.

By mid-2020, CrossCountry had considerably curtailed its services in response to the significant decline of passenger travel amid the COVID-19 pandemic. From 15 June 2020, both passengers and staff on public transport in England, including CrossCountry services, were required to wear face coverings while travelling, and that anyone failing to do so would be liable to be refused travel or fined.

=== Extension of the franchise ===
While the franchise had been originally due to conclude on 31 March 2016, during August 2013, it was announced that it had been extended until December 2019. At one point, it had been expected that an ITT would be issued in October 2018 for the next franchise, but in September 2018 it was announced that the competition had been cancelled so that the recommendations from a report into the franchise system could be incorporated. In July 2019, the Direct Award was further extended by one year, moving the expiry date back to October 2020.

During September 2020, it was announced that the emergency agreements with train operating companies introduced due to the COVID-19 pandemic in the United Kingdom were to be extended for 18 months, and that all passenger rail franchising in Great Britain was abandoned. In October 2020, the DfT confirmed that the franchise had been extended for three years, putting the finishing date back to 15 October 2023. In September 2023, the DfT announced a franchise extension for a further four years to 15 October 2027 with a chance of extension of an additional four years. The franchise deal includes the refurbishment of the existing fleet, the potential introduction of extra rolling stock, the return of regular services linking Cambridge and Stansted Airport, and by December 2024 the reintroduction of daily services between Cardiff Central and Edinburgh Waverley.

=== Industrial action ===
During November and December 2017, CrossCountry on-board train managers and senior conductors affiliated with the National Union of Rail, Maritime and Transport Workers (RMT) staged five 24-hour and two 48-hour strikes in an industrial dispute regarding staff rostering, in particular in relation to working on Sundays. Further strikes had been planned for January 2018, but these were cancelled after CrossCountry and the RMT came to an agreement over staff working conditions on 11 January.

Separate strike action was later threatened by the Transport Salaried Staffs' Association (TSSA) union later that month, with strikes planned for 26 January. These were in relation to CrossCountry staff being offered a 1% pay rise, compared to a 3.3% pay rise for staff at other Arriva-owned train operating companies. As a result of an agreement with CrossCountry to match their demands for an equal pay rise, the planned industrial action by the TSSA was cancelled.

CrossCountry is one of several train operators affected by the 2022–2024 United Kingdom railway strikes, the first national rail strike in the UK for three decades. Its workers were amongst those who voted in favour of industrial action due to a dispute over pay and working conditions. CrossCountry was capable of operating only a very minimal timetable on any of the planned dates for the strikes due to the number of staff involved.

=== Performance issues ===
In August 2024, the Secretary of State for Transport, Louise Haigh, criticised the company's performance saying she had "serious concerns" and threatened to take action if it did not improve, following its request to reduce its service levels in the new three-month timetable which is due to run from 10 August to 9 November 2024. The company cited a driver training backlog as the reason for the reduced service. In a letter to the company's joint interim managing directors, Haigh said

Over the past year, the level of train cancellations across your company has increased significantly and by your own forecasts, you expected to breach your contractual targets for cancellations in the coming months. I do not find this level of service provision acceptable, nor do I find a three-month reduced timetable to be a satisfactory response. Given your inability to run a full timetable, and the need to provide clear information for passengers I had little choice but to approve this request. Put simply, the only reason I accepted your proposal was to give passengers more certainty on which services will run. If you fail to deliver the Remedial Plan, I will not hesitate to take further action.

— Haigh, Louise, Letter from the Secretary of State for Transport to CrossCountry about its train service performance

On the 23rd August 2026, all CrossCountry services nationally, with the exception of services between Stansted Airport and Peterborough, and a limited service between Birmingham New Street, Derby and Leicester from the early evening, were cancelled for the entire day due to a power failure at their control centre. 17 other train operating companies agreed to accept CrossCountry tickets, with a number running additional services in place of CrossCountry services.

== Services ==
The company operates medium- and long-distance services that run outside of the London area. The network is centred at Birmingham New Street. Services can be categorised into two types:

- Inter-City: long-distance, fast services between the South of England and the North of England or Scotland via Birmingham, these routes are typically operated by Voyager sets.
- Regional: medium-distance, stopping or semi-fast services between Birmingham and other cities in the Midlands, as well as some longer runs to Wales and East Anglia (Cambridge & Stansted Airport). These are usually operated by Turbostars.

CrossCountry's official website does show a distinction between the two types of services (for example, each has a separate timetable booklet), but does not explicitly call them Inter-City and Regional.

=== Core ===
As of June 2026, the Monday-Friday daytime services, with frequencies in trains per hour (tph), include:

South West to Manchester and Scotland
Route	tph	Calling at
Plymouth – Edinburgh Waverley	1	Totnes, Newton Abbot, Exeter St Davids, Tiverton Parkway, Taunton, Bristol Temple Meads, Bristol Parkway, Cheltenham Spa, Worcestershire Parkway (northbound only), Birmingham New Street, Tamworth (1 tp2h), Burton-on-Trent (1 tp2h), Derby, Chesterfield, Sheffield, Wakefield Westgate, Leeds, York, Darlington, Durham, Newcastle, Morpeth (1 tp2h), Alnmouth (1 tp2h), Berwick-upon-Tweed; Services typically call either at Tamworth or Burton-on-Trent, and either at Morpeth or Alnmouth; 3 trains per day additionally call at Dunbar; 2 trains per day run to and from Penzance, calling at St Erth, Hayle, Camborne, Redruth, Truro, St Austell, Par, Lostwithiel, Bodmin Parkway, Liskeard; 2 trains per day runs to and from Aberdeen, calling at Dundee, Leuchars, Cupar, Ladybank, Markinch, Kirkcaldy, Inverkeithing and Haymarket.; 2 trains per day extends to and from Glasgow Central, calling at Haymarket and Motherwell.; 2 trains per day run to and from Cardiff Central, calling at Gloucester, Chepstow (northbound only) and Newport
Bristol Temple Meads – Manchester Piccadilly	1	Bristol Parkway, Cheltenham Spa, Worcestershire Parkway (southbound only), Birmingham New Street, Wolverhampton, Stafford, Stoke-on-Trent, Macclesfield, Stockport; 2 trains per day run to and from Paignton, calling at Torquay, Newton Abbot, Teignmouth, Dawlish, Exeter St Davids, Tiverton Parkway, Taunton, Weston-super-Mare (1 train per day)
Bournemouth – Manchester Piccadilly	1	Brockenhurst, Southampton Central, Southampton Airport Parkway, Winchester, Basingstoke, Reading, Oxford, Banbury, Leamington Spa, Coventry, Birmingham International, Birmingham New Street, Wolverhampton, Stafford, Stoke-on-Trent, Macclesfield, Stockport
Reading – York	11 tpd	Oxford, Banbury, Leamington Spa, Birmingham New Street, Derby, Sheffield, Doncaster; Six trains per day extend to/from Newcastle, calling at Darlington and Durham in addition to York; Some trains do not stop at Banbury
Cardiff to Stansted and Nottingham
Route	tph	Calling at
Cardiff Central – Nottingham	1	Newport, Chepstow (2 tp3h), Lydney (1 tp3h), Gloucester, Cheltenham Spa, Worcestershire Parkway, University, Birmingham New Street, Tamworth, Burton-on-Trent, Derby, Long Eaton, Beeston; Services call at either Chepstow or Lydney; 3 trains per day additionally call at Severn Tunnel Junction and Caldicot; 7 services in total per day additionally call at Ashchurch for Tewkesbury
Birmingham New Street - Nottingham	1	Wilnecote, Tamworth, Burton-on-Trent, Willington (1 tp2h), Derby; 1 southbound train per day continues to Bournemouth, calling at Birmingham International, Coventry, Leamington Spa, Banbury, Oxford, Reading, Basingstoke, Winchester, Southampton Airport Parkway and Southampton Central.
Birmingham New Street – Stansted Airport	1	Coleshill Parkway, Nuneaton, Leicester, Melton Mowbray, Oakham, Stamford, Peterborough, March, Ely, Cambridge, Cambridge South; 3 trains per day additionally calls at Whittlesea and/or Manea; 1 train per day additionally calls at Audley End
Birmingham New Street – Leicester	1	Water Orton (1 tp2h), Coleshill Parkway, Nuneaton, Hinckley, Narborough, South Wigston

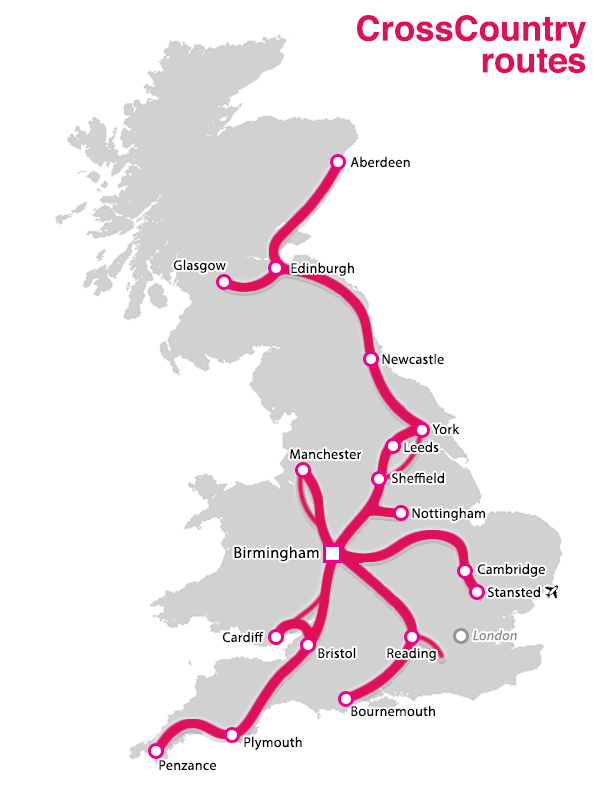
Route map (June 2019)

These services combine to provide higher frequencies between Birmingham and the following major destinations:

- Wolverhampton, Stoke-on-Trent, Macclesfield, Stockport and Manchester: two trains per hour
- Derby: at least three trains per hour
  - Sheffield, York, Darlington and Newcastle: at least one train per hour via Leeds
  - Nottingham: two trains per hour
- Leicester: two trains per hour
- Leamington Spa, Oxford and Reading: two trains per hour (including one via Coventry)
- Cheltenham: three trains per hour
  - Bristol: two trains per hour

The Sunday service pattern is mostly similar to the weekday one, except that services typically do not start until late morning or early afternoon, and often have a slightly different stopping pattern. Several Bristol–Manchester trains start from Birmingham New Street on Sundays.

=== Extensions ===
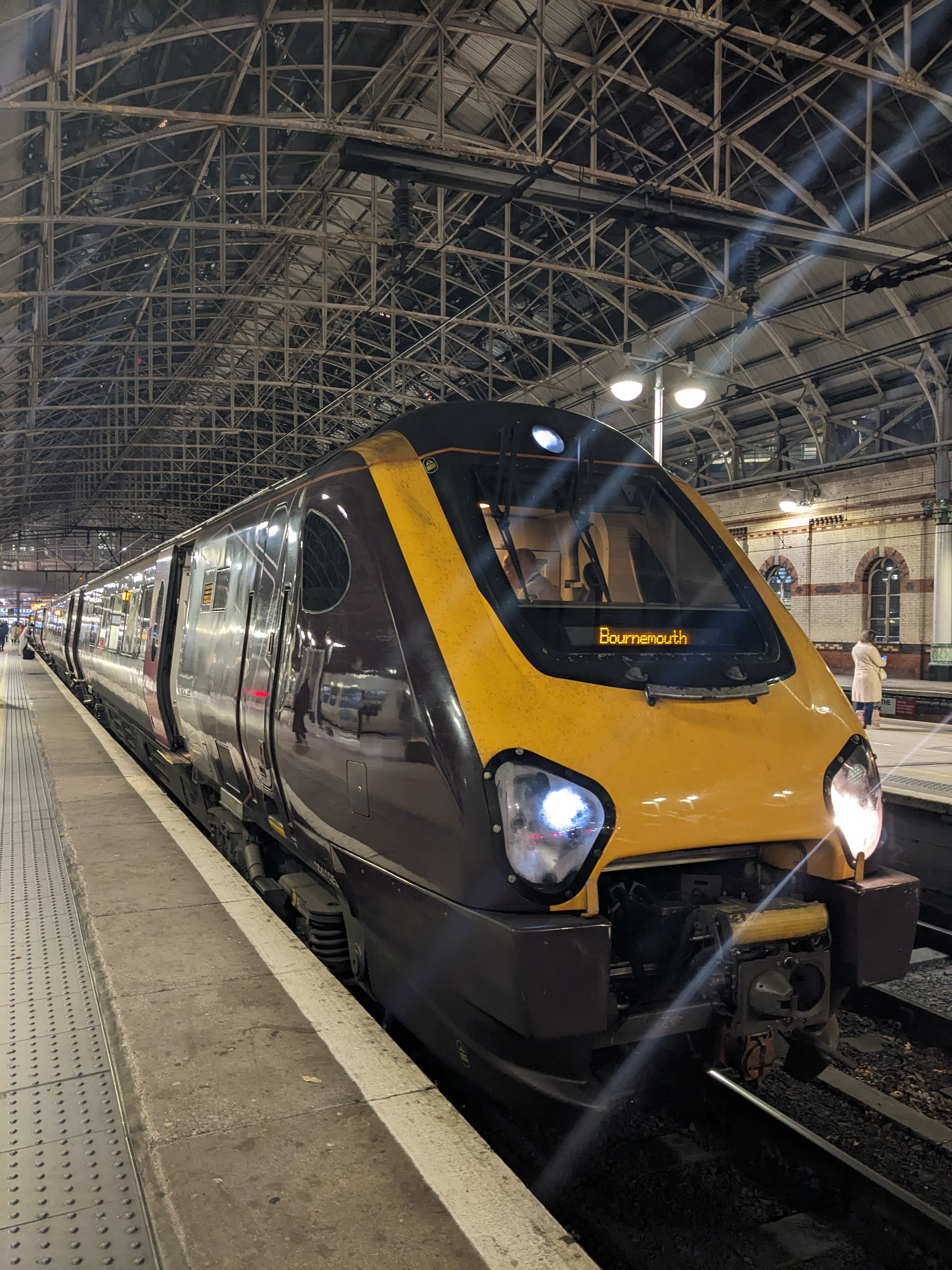
Class 221 Super Voyager at Manchester Piccadilly forming a service to Bournemouth.

The above table shows the basic service pattern; however, a small number of these services are extended beyond their usual destination:

- from Plymouth to Penzance
- from Bristol Temple Meads to Cardiff Central, Exeter St Davids, Paignton, Plymouth and Penzance
- from Edinburgh Waverley to Dundee and Aberdeen
- from Newcastle to Edinburgh Waverley and Glasgow Central
- travelling via Crewe either in lieu of, or in addition to Stoke-on-Trent

Until 2019, CrossCountry also extended a limited number of Plymouth services to Newquay during the summer timetable to serve additional holiday traffic to the Cornish seaside resort. These services were not restarted after being paused during the COVID-19 pandemic in 2020.

=== Special services ===
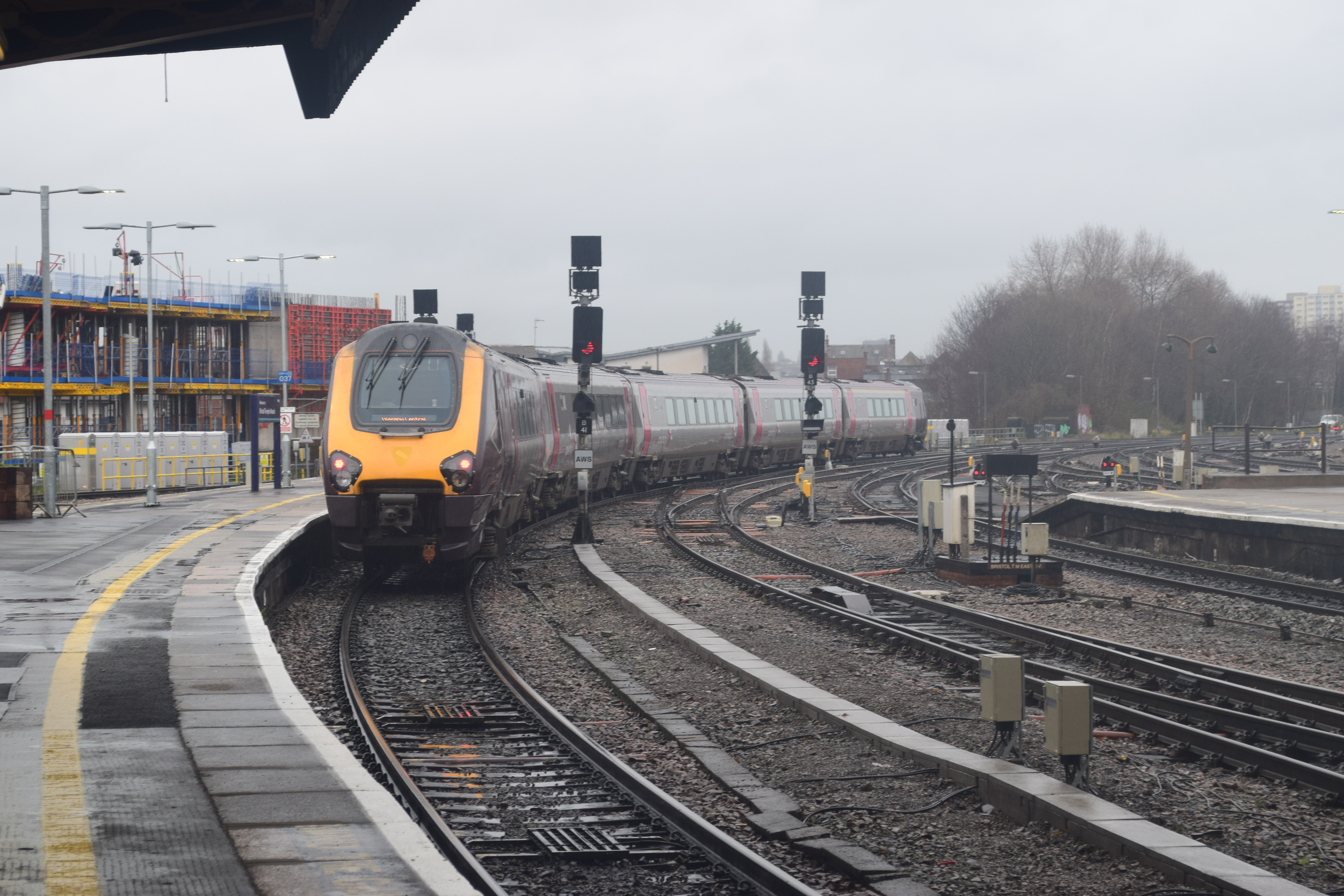
Class 221 at Bristol Temple Meads in 2017

CrossCountry extended some of its Bournemouth services to Weymouth for the Sailing at the 2012 Olympics & Paralympics. There were two services Monday to Saturday in each direction with one in each direction on Sundays. These ran express to Weymouth from Bournemouth. One train also operated a Weymouth to Bournemouth return journey, calling at Wareham and Poole.

=== Proposed services ===
During December 2016, CrossCountry published a consultation document for changes to the timetable proposed to be implemented in December 2017. These included:

- Extending all hourly Bristol–Manchester services to and from Exeter St Davids, providing a total of two trains per hour between Exeter and Birmingham;
- Increasing the frequency of services during peak times on several routes;
- An additional service to and from Aberdeen running in the early afternoon.

To allow these changes to take place, all CrossCountry services on some routes (which had a limited service) would be withdrawn and replaced with extra services run by other operators. These included:

- between Exeter St Davids and Paignton (except for one early-morning northbound service), replaced by Great Western Railway services;
- between Reading and Guildford, replaced by Great Western Railway services;
- between Edinburgh Waverley and Aberdeen in the morning and evening (Aberdeen would be served during the day instead), replaced by ScotRail services. (Note: The proposed withdrawal did not include the morning/evening services that run only between Edinburgh and Dundee.)

In April 2017, it was announced the proposed changes would not be proceeding.

=== Stations served only by CrossCountry ===
CrossCountry does not manage any stations, although there are stations managed by other train operating companies at which it is the only operator: five stations (Burton-on-Trent, Hinckley, Narborough, South Wigston and Willington) are managed by East Midlands Railway, while three stations (Coleshill Parkway, Water Orton and Wilnecote) are managed by West Midlands Trains. At Tamworth station, which has tracks and platforms at two levels, the high-level platforms are served only by CrossCountry, but the entire station is managed by West Midlands Trains, which serves the low-level platforms alongside Avanti West Coast. Similarly, at Worcestershire Parkway, the low-level platforms are served only by CrossCountry, but the station is managed by Great Western Railway, which serves only the high-level platform.

Manea was served only by CrossCountry until 2013, when Abellio Greater Anglia started running one train every two hours at the station in addition to the CrossCountry services there.

=== Other route information ===
To improve the travelling experience, CrossCountry has designated four stations as alternative changeover stations: these are Cheltenham Spa, Derby, Leamington Spa and Wolverhampton. Connection times can be shorter at these smaller stations. For example, passengers travelling from Cardiff to Edinburgh could change at Cheltenham – where both their trains use the same platform – instead of Birmingham New Street, a larger, more complex station.

== Rolling stock ==
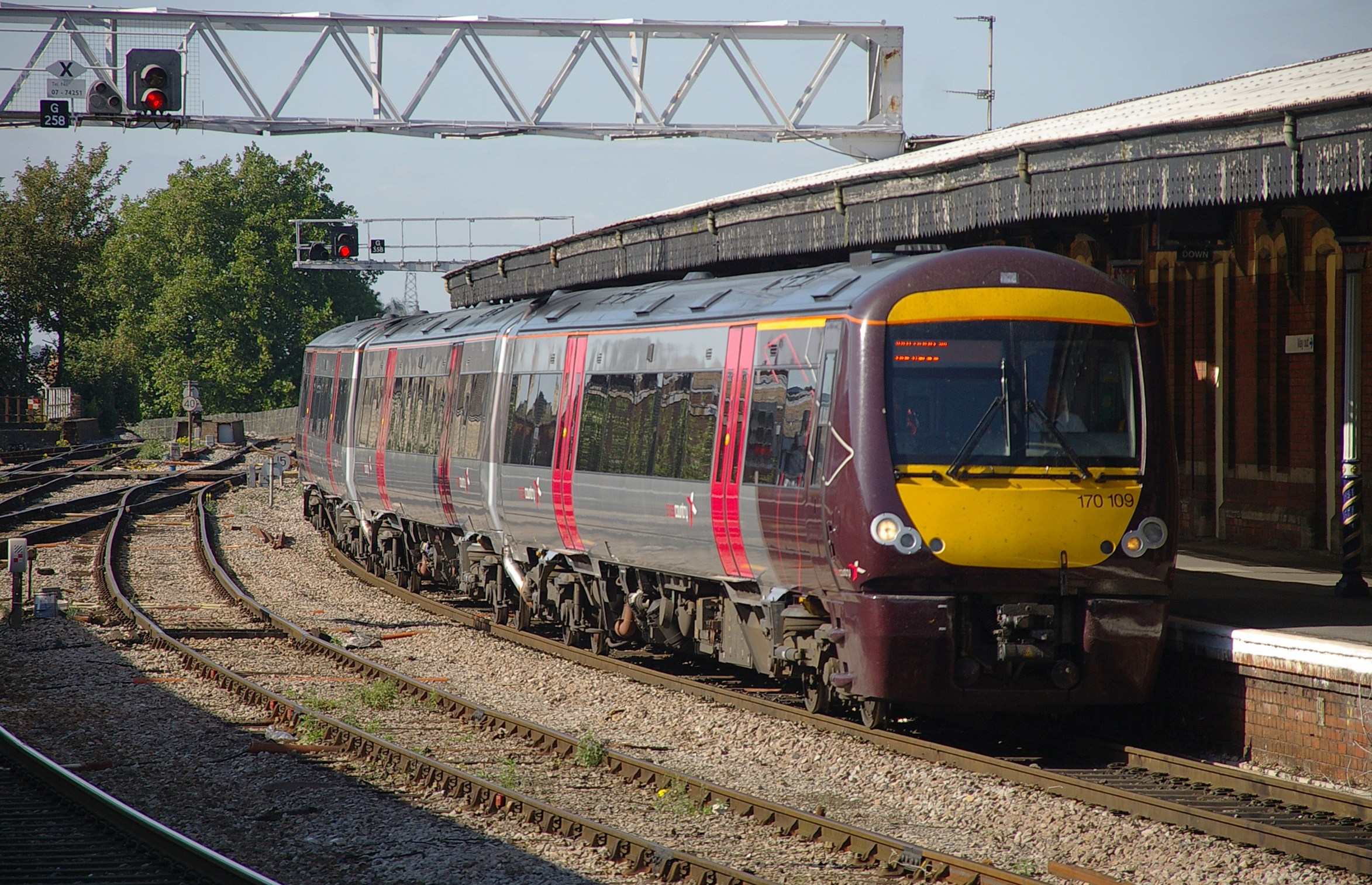
Class 170 Turbostar 170109 at Gloucester

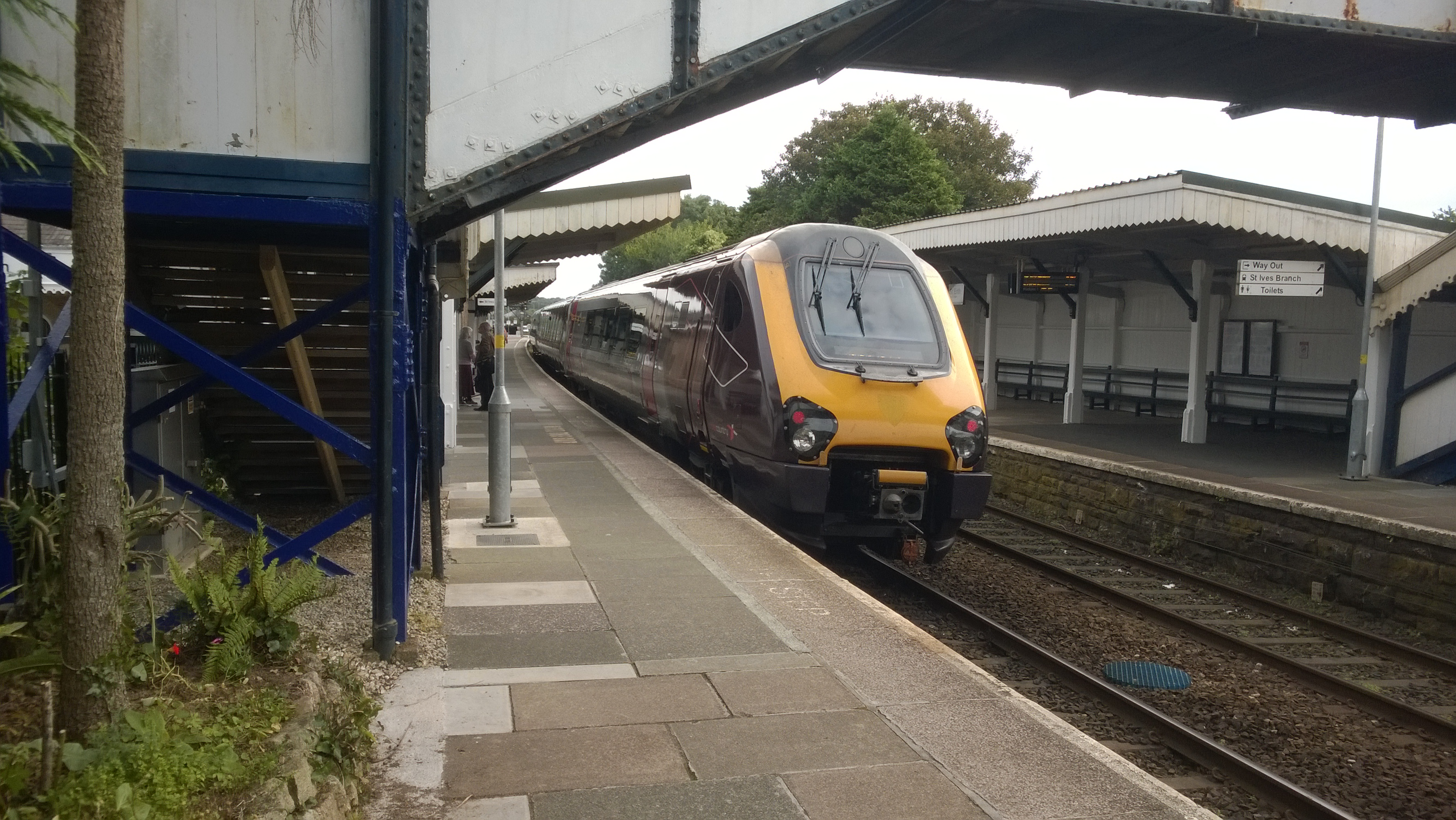
Class 220 Voyager 220011 at St Erth, working a service from Penzance to Manchester Piccadilly

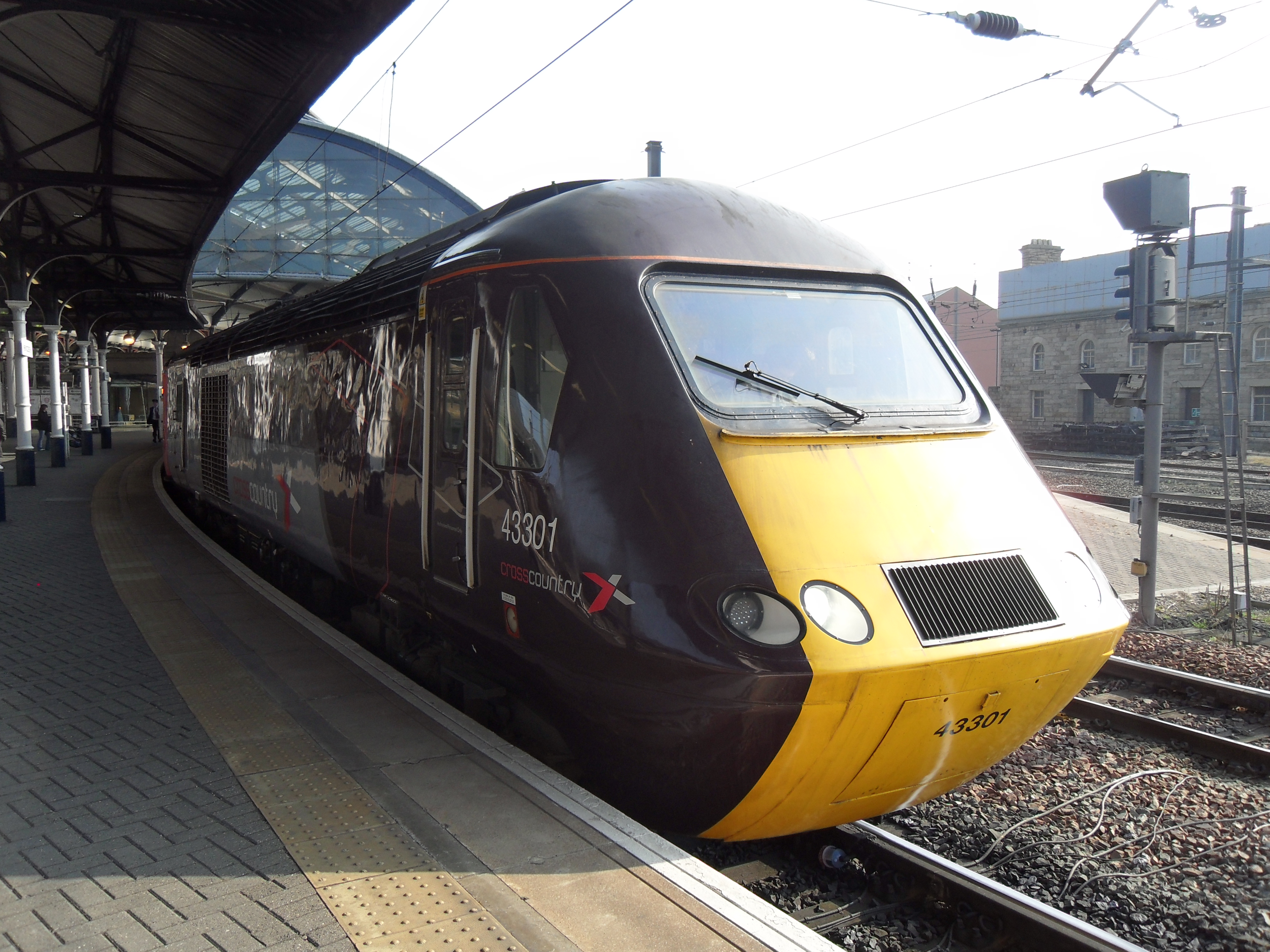
HST power car 43301 at Newcastle

CrossCountry services are operated using diesel trains only, since none of the routes it operates are fully electrified.

CrossCountry inherited 34 four-car Class 220 Voyagers and 40 five-car and 4 four-car Class 221 Super Voyagers from Virgin CrossCountry as well as 11 two-car and 18 three-car Class 170 Turbostars from Central Trains.

In December 2007 Class 221 Super Voyagers 221101 - 113 and 221142 - 144 were transferred to Virgin Trains West Coast with 221114 - 118 following in December 2008.

A franchise commitment was the acquisition of ten Class 43 power cars and forty Mark 3 carriages. Midland Mainline had six Class 43 power cars and fourteen Mark 3 carriages that were off lease from November 2007 that were leased. The remaining four Class 43 power cars were ex Virgin CrossCountry examples in varying states of decay, while the carriages were five ex-Virgin CrossCountry Mark 3 carriages and twenty-one ex-Virgin Trains West Coast loco-hauled Mark 3B carriages. Most had been in store at Long Marston for a few years.

After driver training the ex-Midland Mainline sets returned to service in May 2008 on Glasgow and Edinburgh to Plymouth diagrams while the other Class 43 power cars were overhauled at Brush Traction including repowering with MTU engines and the Mark 3 carriages overhauled at Doncaster Works to a similar specification as GNER's Mallard refurbishments. Once these were completed, the ex-Midland Mainline examples were also overhauled.

To operate services to Paignton and Newquay on summer Saturdays, two High Speed Trains were hired from National Express East Coast in 2008. High Speed Trains were hired from East Coast and East Midlands Trains on a number of occasions to operate services from Edinburgh Waverley to Plymouth when HSTs or Voyagers were unavailable.

During 2008, the Class 170 Turbostar fleet was refurbished, during which the three-carriage units repainted at Marcroft Engineering, Stoke-on-Trent, the two-carriage units at EWS's Toton depot and the interiors renewed by Transys Projects, Clacton-on-Sea, including the fitting of first-class seating to the Class 170/5s and 170/6s.

The tilt function on the Class 221 Super Voyagers was removed in 2008; tilting was not required on the parts of the West Coast Main Line that CrossCountry serves. CrossCountry stated this change would improve reliability and reduce maintenance costs.

Between 2008 and 2009, both the Class 220 Voyagers and Class 221 Super Voyagers underwent refurbishment at Bombardier Transportation's Derby Litchurch Lane Works. This work involved the removal of the shop, adding 25% extra luggage space and fourteen extra standard-class seats to the Class 220 Voyagers and 20% extra luggage space and sixteen extra standard-class seats to the Class 221 Super Voyagers. Three years later, a refresh of the interiors was conducted, during which the standard-class seats were re-covered in the existing red and blue moquette and while the first class seats were finished with a maroon moquette. In summer 2014, CrossCountry began removing the quiet coach designation from such vehicles across its Voyager fleet, believing them to be outdated and to take up an excessive amount of space on a four-car unit; however, it did retain the quiet coaches on its five HST sets.

During November 2017, as a part of CrossCountry's franchise extension, two former Virgin Trains Class 221 Super Voyager driving cars of unit 221144 were reactivated, having been stored at Central Rivers TMD for several years. Two of the existing five-car sets released a centre carriage that, when combined with the reactivated pair of driving cars, allowed an additional four-car set to be formed.

In 2021, six of the existing two-carriage Class 170s were lengthened. This happened as a result of East Midlands Railway only leasing the two-carriage driving vehicles of the West Midlands Railway 170/6 sets, hence six centre cars became available when they were replaced by West Midlands Trains for transfer to CrossCountry.

In September 2023, it was announced that seven Class 221 "Super Voyagers" would be transferred from Avanti West Coast to CrossCountry, following the withdrawal of its HSTs.

In March 2024, it was announced that a further five Class 221 Super Voyagers would be transferred from Avanti West Coast. In addition, all of CrossCountry's Voyager trains will be refurbished, as well as its regional Turbostar fleet.

The first refurbished unit (220033) was unveiled on February 10, 2026, at Alstom's Litchurch Lane works in Derby.

=== Current rolling stock ===
Family	Class	Image	Type	Top speed		Number	Carriages	Built
Family	Class	Image	Type	mph	km/h	Number	Carriages	Built
Bombardier Turbostar	170		DMU	100	160	7	2	1998–2002
Bombardier Turbostar	170		DMU	100	160	22	3	1998–2002
Bombardier Voyager	220 Voyager		DEMU	125	200	34	4	2000–2001
Bombardier Voyager	221 Super Voyager		DEMU	125	200	4	4	2001–2002
Bombardier Voyager	221 Super Voyager		DEMU	125	200	32	5	2001–2002

=== Past rolling stock ===
The last InterCity 125s were withdrawn on 18 September 2023. The last service operated was the 16:27 from Plymouth to Leeds.

Family	Class	Image	Type	Top speed		Number	Carriages	Built
Family	Class	Image	Type	mph	km/h	Number	Carriages	Built
InterCity 125	43		Diesel locomotive	125	200	12	2+7	1976–1982
InterCity 125	Mark 3		Passenger carriage	125	200	40	2+7	1975–1988

Preceded by Central Trains; Central Trains franchise	Operator of New CrossCountry franchise 2007–2027	Incumbent
Preceded by Virgin CrossCountry; InterCity CrossCountry franchise	Operator of New CrossCountry franchise 2007–2027	Incumbent
