= Leicester railway station =

Railway station in Leicestershire, England

Leicester
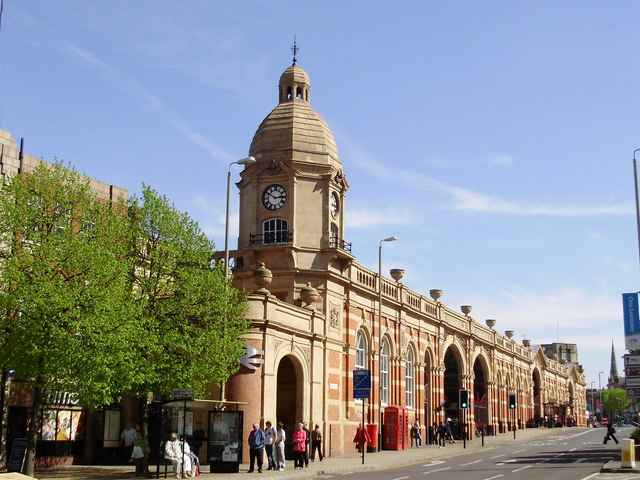
- The station, as seen from London Road (northern entrance)

General information
- Location: Leicester, City of Leicester, England
- Coordinates: 52.632°N 1.124°W
- Grid reference: SK593041
- Manager: East Midlands Railway
- Platforms: 4

Other information
- Station code: LEI
- Classification: DfT category B

History
- Original company: Midland Counties Railway
- Pre-grouping: Midland Railway
- Post-grouping: London, Midland and Scottish Railway

Key dates
- 5 May 1840: Opened as Leicester
- 1 June 1867: Renamed Leicester Campbell Street
- 12 June 1892: Renamed Leicester London Road
- 1894: First rebuild
- 5 May 1969: Renamed Leicester
- 1978: Second rebuild

Passengers
- 2020/21: ▼1.042 million
- Interchange: ▼78,735
- 2021/22: ▲3.549 million
- Interchange: ▲0.276 million
- 2022/23: ▲4.870 million
- Interchange: ▲0.423 million
- 2023/24: ▲5.304 million
- Interchange: ▲0.462 million
- 2024/25: ▲5.527 million
- Interchange: ▲0.518 million
Location
Notes
- Passenger statistics from the Office of Rail and Road

Leicester (formerly Leicester Campbell Street and Leicester London Road) is a main line railway station that serves the city of Leicester, in Leicestershire, England. It lies on the Midland Main Line, which connects London St Pancras with Sheffield and Nottingham; it is 99 miles 7 chains (99.1 mi; 159.5 km) north of St Pancras. The station is owned by Network Rail and managed by East Midlands Railway, which also operates services along with CrossCountry. It is the busiest station in Leicestershire, the second busiest in the East Midlands and the fifth busiest in the Midlands as a whole. It was opened in 1840 by the Midland Counties Railway, then rebuilt in 1894 and 1978.

== History ==
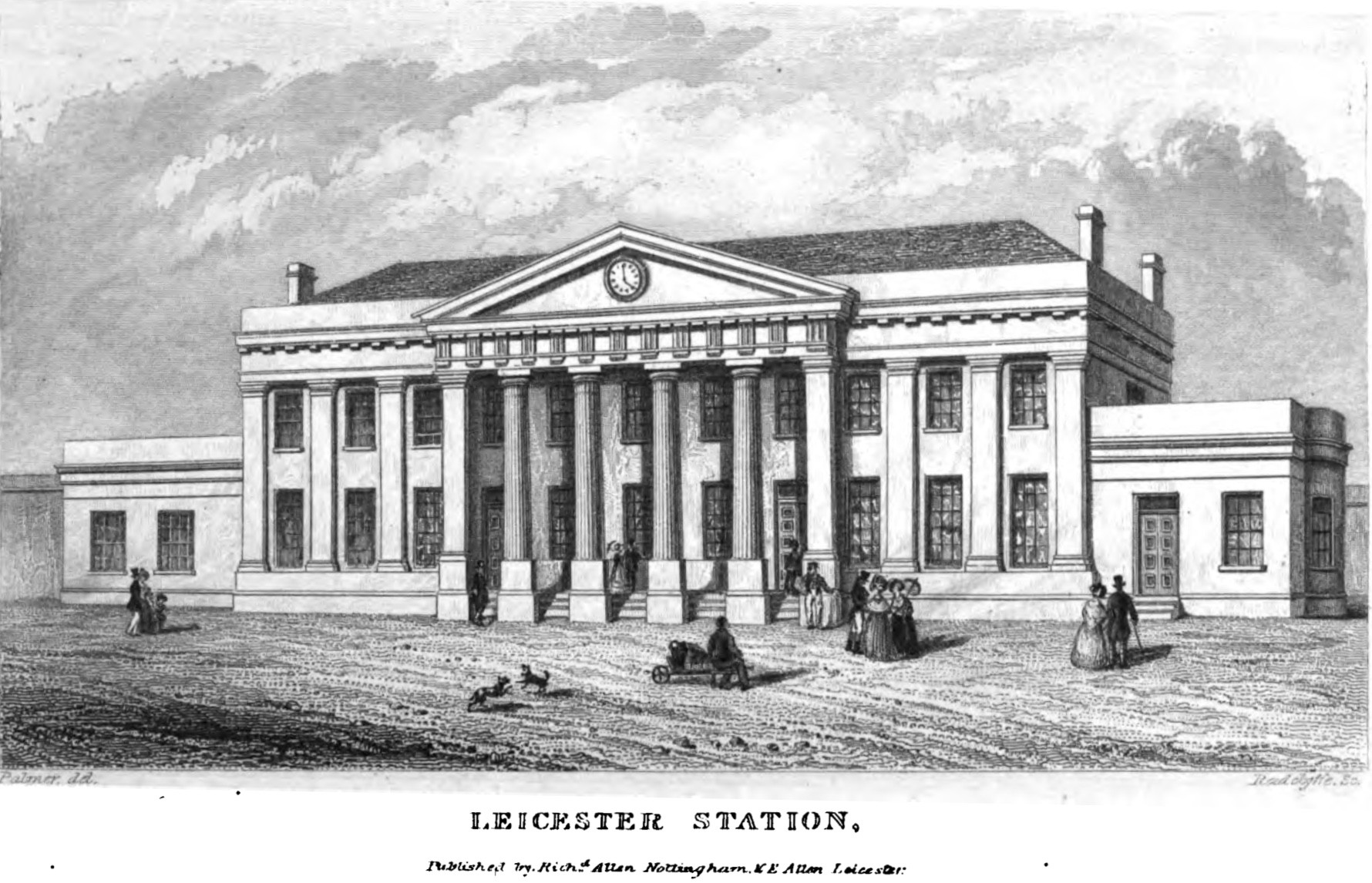
The station featured in the Midland Counties Railway Companion of 1840

The first station on the site opened on 5 May 1840; it was originally known simply as Leicester, becoming Leicester Campbell Street in June 1867 and Leicester London Road from 12 June 1892. This was replaced in 1894 by a new namesake station, but was usually referred to as "Midland Station" to differentiate it from Leicester Central; following the closure of the latter on 5 May 1969, this station was renamed Leicester.

Leicester was first served by a railway, when the Leicester and Swannington Railway built its terminus station at West Bridge, on the western side of Leicester in 1832.

In total, the city had seven railway stations. There were three other main stations:

- Leicester West Bridge, which was closed to passengers in 1928
- Leicester Belgrave Road, on the Great Northern Railway, which was closed to passengers in 1962
- Leicester Central, on the Great Central Railway, which was closed in May 1969.

There were also three smaller stations within the city boundaries at:

- Humberstone Road, on the London Midland and Scottish Railway
- Humberstone, on the GNR
- Welford Road from 1874 until 1918, a halt on the Midland Main Line, allowing access to the Cattle Market.

=== The station buildings ===
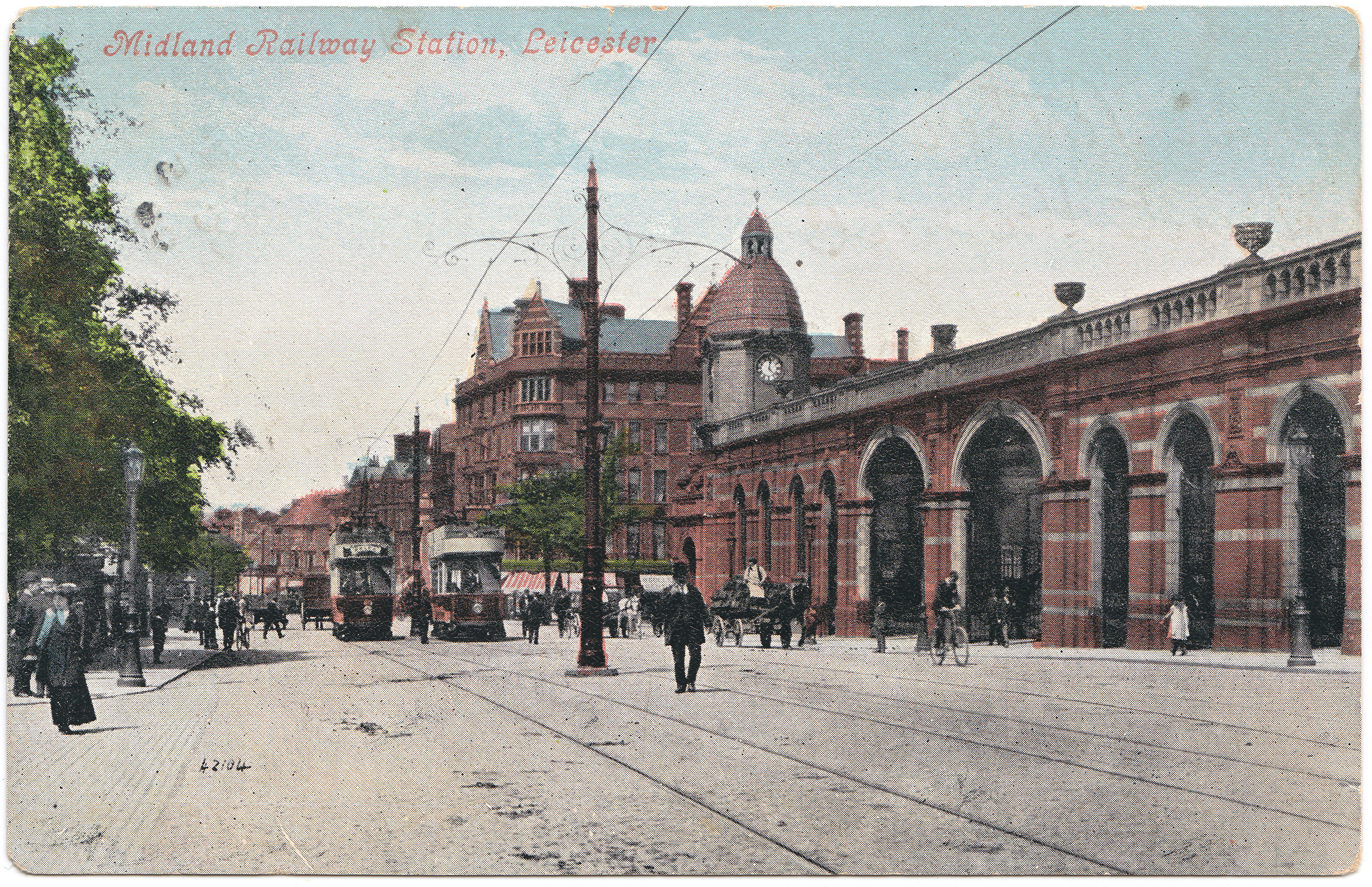
Leicester station in the 1900s

The contract for the first station on the present site was awarded by the Midland Counties Railway to Waterfield and Smith, and was just under £15,000 (equivalent to £1,321,200 in 2025).

It was first used on 4 May 1840, when a train of four first and six second-class carriages, pulled by the Leopard steam engine, arrived from Nottingham. As was normal in those days with a through station, the original plan was to build it to the side of the main line, but instead it was finally built on the main line with a single platform 165 yards long to handle both northbound and southbound trains. The station was designed by William Parsons in the Grecian Revival style, with a two-storey main building which was embellished with a central pediment set forward on fluted columns in front. This was flanked by short single-storey wings. It was the headquarters of the Midland Counties Railway until that railway was amalgamated into the Midland Railway in 1844. Upstairs were the company offices and boardroom, while downstairs was the booking hall, waiting and refreshment rooms.

The opening of new routes to Leicester led to steadily increasing traffic and, by 1858, a second platform had been built to handle southbound traffic, so leaving the original platform to handle northbound traffic. In 1868, it was decided to turn the southbound platform into an island platform to further increase capacity, but this was not possible with the northbound platform due to the presence of the main buildings and station entrance.

Further expansion was contemplated for some time, but it was not until 1890 that the go ahead was given for Campbell Street station to be replaced by the present facility. All that remains of the first station is a pair of gateposts in an Egyptian style at the end of Station Street. The offices for Royal Mail now occupy some of the site of the old station buildings on Campbell Street.

The Midland Railway completely rebuilt the station between 1892 and 1894 to a design by the architect Charles Trubshaw. The new booking office was opened by the mayor in June 1892, when it was renamed Leicester London Road; the station was completed in 1894. The frontage on London Road featured four entrance archways; above each of the left-hand pair, the word Departure was inscribed and, above each of the other two, the word Arrival was carved in relief. These signs were to assist cab drivers when dropping passengers, who intended to catch departing train, or were plying for hire by passengers who had arrived by train.

The new station frontage on London Road remains as a well-preserved late Victorian building, but the interior of the booking hall and the structures on the platforms were reconstructed by Sir Robert McAlpine in 1978.

The station clock is the only hand-wound station clock in the UK.

=== Regeneration of the station ===
Prospect Leicestershire led plans which aimed to regenerate the city centre area of Leicester, the station was to be incorporated into a new business quarter. Plans for the station included to rotate the passengers facilities so that they exited into a new open city plaza rather than the current busy ring road. Renewed plans were released in 2008 for the £150 million redevelopment, promising over 2,800 new jobs in the area due to the new shops and offices which would be created. However, due to the Great Recession, these plans failed to materialise. Network Rail and East Midlands Trains started work on a £3.5 million scheme in 2012. Platforms have been resurfaced, toilets and both first and standard class waiting areas refurbished.

Network Rail adopted a Route Utilisation Strategy for freight in 2007 which will create a new cross country freight route from Peterborough (on the East Coast Main Line) to Nuneaton (on the West Coast Main Line). One of the next stages (around 2013) will create additional lines through Leicester during a resignalling scheme. During this period additional platforms may be provided at Leicester.

== Facilities ==
The main entrance to the station is on London Road. The ticket office and travel centre are located in the concourse. This concourse gives access to the main station footbridge to all platforms, and via a corridor to the lifts. There is also a footbridge at the northern end, giving access to the long-stay car park and Campbell Street.

The station is based on two island platforms, which are wide with a long series of buildings. There is a newsagent and several food outlets including a café and licensed bar, along with toilets and a large waiting room.

The station has an office for the British Transport Police and cash point in the porte-cochère, as well as a taxi rank and short-stay drop-off and pick-up area.

In 2021, Leicester City Council proposed a £22 million plan to add a new platform, as well as relocate the main entrance of the concourse onto Station Street.

== Passenger volume ==
Passenger volume at Leicester (Note: The statistics cover twelve month periods that start in April.)
	2004–05	2005–06	2006–07	2007–08	2008–09	2009–10	2010–11	2011–12	2012–13	2013–14	2014–15	2015–16	2016–17	2017–18	2018–19	2019–20	2020–21	2021–22	2022–23	2023–24	2024–25
Entries and exits	4,456,662	4,360,891	4,778,063	4,969,109	5,132,022	4,992,390	4,953,636	4,896,018	4,797,294	4,853,908	5,052,026	5,247,140	5,422,928	5,390,776	5,582,286	5,322,728	1,042,118	3,548,600	4,869,836	5,303,830	5,527,136
Interchanges	372,261	384,983	383,370	353,101	420,563	367,430	394,301	465,579	484,786	452,471	467,456	482,988	494,187	500,788	517,295	487,203	78,735	276,360	422,690	462,423	517,869

== Services ==
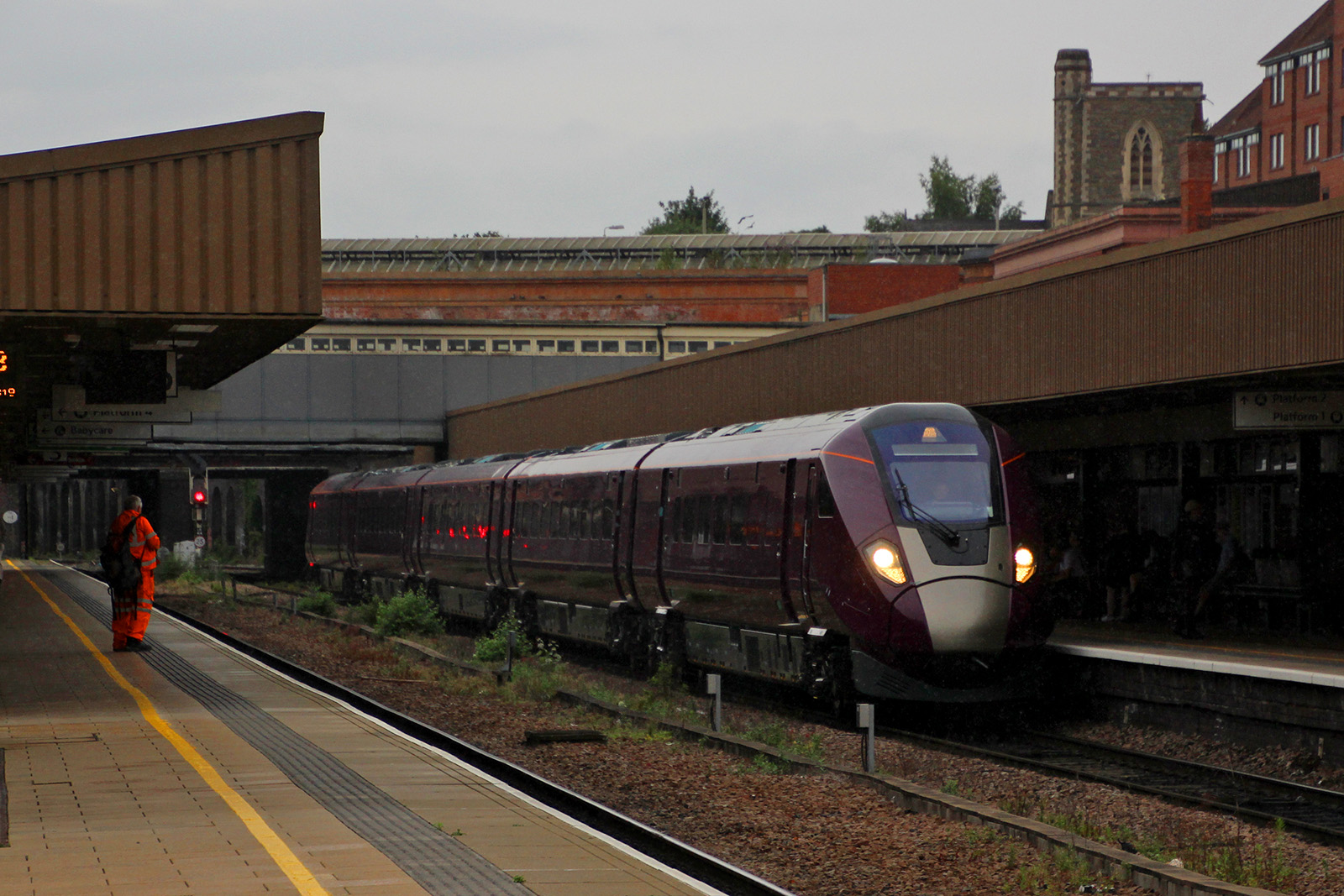
A new East Midlands Railway bi-mode Class 810 at the station in 2024

=== Current ===
Routes run north–south through Leicester on the Midland Main Line, south to Kettering, Bedford, Luton and London St Pancras; and north to Derby, Nottingham, Lincoln Central and Sheffield. Junctions north and south of the station serve the east-west cross-country route, going east to Peterborough, Cambridge and Stansted Airport; and west to Nuneaton and Birmingham New Street.

The station offers the Plusbus scheme, which allows bus and train tickets to be bought together at a saving.

The station is serviced by two train operating companies; the general weekday off-peak service pattern in trains per hour/day (tph/tpd) is:

East Midlands Railway:

- 4 tph to London St Pancras International (2 non-stop, 2 semi-fast stopping at Kettering)
- 2 tph to Nottingham (1 non-stop, 1 semi-fast stopping at Beeston)
- 2 tph to Sheffield (1 fast, 1 semi-fast) via Derby and Chesterfield
- 1 tph to Nottingham (local stopping service).

CrossCountry:

- 2 tph to Birmingham New Street (1 semi-fast, 1 stopping) via Nuneaton
- 1 tph to Stansted Airport, via Peterborough and Cambridge.

From 14 December 2025, direct services from Leicester to Lincoln Central no longer run as a regular off-peak service, due to a recast of the EMR timetable. These services terminate at Nottingham instead, but continue to provide a local stopping pattern calling at all stations towards Nottingham, unlike existing inter-city services. Passengers who want to travel to Lincoln Central or Grimsby Town, via Newark Castle, have to change trains at Nottingham instead.

Preceding station	National Rail	Following station
South Wigston	CrossCountry; Birmingham-Leicester	Terminus
Narborough	CrossCountry; Birmingham-Leicester	Terminus
Nuneaton	CrossCountry Birmingham-Stansted Airport	Melton Mowbray
London St Pancras International	East Midlands Railway Midland Main Line	Loughborough
London St Pancras International	East Midlands Railway Midland Main Line; London to Sheffield	Derby
Market Harborough	East Midlands Railway Midland Main Line; London to Nottingham	Nottingham
Market Harborough	East Midlands Railway Midland Main Line; London to Nottingham	Loughborough
Terminus	East Midlands Railway Ivanhoe Line	Syston
	Historical railways	
Terminus	Midland Railway; Leicester to Burton upon Trent Line	Kirby Muxloe; Line open, station closed

=== Proposed ===
In June 2026, Grand Central (GC) applied for up to five daily direct return services between Manchester Piccadilly and London St Pancras, calling at Stockport, Macclesfield, Congleton, Stoke-on-Trent, Uttoxeter, Derby, Loughborough, Leicester, Wellingborough and Luton Airport Parkway (Note: Set down/pick up only.)

The proposal responds to a number of gaps and issues in the current railway offering. GC said its proposed offer “addresses a clear gap in the network” by linking the North West and East Midlands. It also argues that serving Uttoxeter would enable direct rail access to the UK’s largest theme park, Alton Towers, from London and Manchester, and has the resort’s backing.

GC also argues that its application “seeks to make pragmatic use” of off-peak Midland Main Line capacity, a route it said is “materially less constrained.”

The proposed service could start in May 2029.

Preceding station	National Rail	Following station
Loughborough	Grand Central; Manchester-London; Proposed service	Wellingborough

== Future ==
=== Electrification ===
As of 2025, the railway through Leicester is not electrified. Plans to carry out full electrification of the Midland Main Line were paused in July 2025 after being previously announced, commenced, suspended, cancelled and resumed. Since 2026, services have been operated using bi-mode electro-diesel trains running in electric mode between London St Pancras and Wigston, just 4 miles (6.4 km)) south of Leicester, switching to diesel-electric power northwards from there.

From 2020, several events have changed the prospects for the station, even though improvements had been on and off the political agenda for over a decade. News outlets reported in December 2020 that prospects for electrification to Market Harborough were improving. On 23 March 2021, the Transport Select Committee published its sixth report in the Trains Fit for the Future inquiry, which called for a rolling programme of electrification. It stated that the Midland Main Line project would be divided into eight sections. Modern Railways confirmed that the project would continue north of Market Harborough all the way to Leicester and Sheffield.

Another major development was the publishing of the Integrated Rail Plan on 18 November 2021. This included full Midland Main Line electrification and upgrades. The Felixstowe–Nuneaton railway upgrade is still being delivered in stages.

=== Ivanhoe Line ===
After phase one of the Ivanhoe Line was completed in the mid-1990s, it was originally planned that phase two would extend the line west to Burton upon Trent on the current freight-only line, via Coalville and Ashby-de-la-Zouch. The possibility was studied in 2008 and again in 2016 but, in both cases, the conclusion was that the cost was not justified by the benefits.

The most recent study, in 2016, costed the work at up to £175 million and claimed that an additional 206,000 houses would need to be built along the route to generate enough passengers to make the line profitable.
