= South Leicestershire Railway =

- Predecessor: Nuneaton and Hinckley Railway
- Founded: 14 June 1860
- Defunct: 1867
- Fate: taken over
- Successor: London and North Western Railway
- Area served: Leicestershire, Warwickshire

Nuneaton and Hinckley Railway Act 1859
- Act of Parliament
- Parliament of the United Kingdom
- Long title: An Act for making a Railway from the Trent Valley Railway at Nuneaton in the County of Warwick to Hinckley in the County of Leicester, and for other Purposes.
- Citation: 22 & 23 Vict. c. civ

Dates
- Royal assent: 13 August 1859

Nuneaton and Hinckley Railway Extension Act 1860
- Act of Parliament
- Parliament of the United Kingdom
- Long title: An Act to change the Name of the Nuneaton and Hinckley Railway Company; and to enable that Company to extend their Railway from Hinckley in the County of Leicester to the Midland Railway at Wigston Magna near Leicester in the same County; and for other Purposes.
- Citation: 23 & 24 Vict. c. xci

Dates
- Royal assent: 14 June 1860

The South Leicestershire Railway was founded by the Nuneaton and Hinckley Railway Act 1859 (22 & 23 Vict. c. civ) as the Nuneaton and Hinckley Railway, with legal powers to build a 4.5 miles (7 km) railway from Nuneaton on the London and North Western Railway to Hinckley in Leicestershire. The Nuneaton and Hinckley Railway Extension Act 1860 (23 & 24 Vict. c. xci) authorised the company to extend its line to Wigston Junction on the Midland Railway and to rename itself the South Leicestershire Railway. The extension was completed in 1864 which included stations at Elmesthorpe (for Earl Shilton and Barwell), Croft, Narborough, Blaby and Wigston as well as sidings for the granite quarries at Stoney Stanton, Croft and Enderby.

The South Leicestershire Railway was taken over in 1867 by the LNWR, which in turn became part of the London, Midland and Scottish Railway in the 1923 grouping.

In the 1960s British Railways closed all of the South Leicestershire Railway's stations except Hinckley. However, public objections led BR to reopen Narborough in 1970. Leicestershire County Council opened a new station in 1986 at South Wigston, about 300 metres east of the South Leicestershire Railway's former Glen Parva station.
