= Welford Road railway station =

Former railway station in Leicestershire, England

Welford Road

General information
- Location: Leicester, Leicestershire; England
- Coordinates: 52.6197°N 1.1306°W
- Grid reference: SK590028
- Platforms: 1

Other information
- Status: Disused

History
- Pre-grouping: London and North Western Railway

Key dates
- 1874?: Station opened
- 6 Feb 1918: Station closed
Location

Welford Road railway station was a railway station built by the London and North Western Railway to allow their staff to collect passenger tickets from LNWR trains entering Leicester from the south.

It was situated immediately south of the road bridge carrying Welford Road above the line, less than 1 mile from Leicester station. Knighton tunnel is just to the south.

Later in the station's (brief) history, passengers were allowed to alight here, with trains stopping here only on Wednesdays and Saturdays to serve the cattle market.

No platform was ever built to serve the southbound line.

The station was closed on 6 February 1918.
