= Higham Ferrers railway station =

Disused railway station in Northamptonshire, England

Coordinates: 52.3061°N 0.5890°W

Higham Ferrers

General information
- Location: Higham Ferrers, North Northamptonshire; England
- Platforms: 1

Other information
- Status: Disused

History
- Original company: Midland Railway
- Pre-grouping: Midland Railway
- Post-grouping: London, Midland and Scottish Railway

Key dates
- 1 May 1894: opened as Higham Ferrers
- 1 July 1902: renamed Higham Ferrers and Irthlingborough
- 1 October 1910: renamed Higham Ferrers
- 15 June 1959: Station closes
Location

Higham Ferrers is a former railway station on the Higham Ferrers branch line from Wellingborough. It served the market town of Higham Ferrers, Northamptonshire, England.

The station was opened by the Midland Railway on 1 May 1894, and was named Higham Ferrers. It was renamed Higham Ferrers and Irthlingborough on 1 July 1902, but reverted to its original name on 1 October 1910. It was closed by British Railways on 15 June 1959.

The line was closed in 1969, and the station has since been demolished and the track lifted. It is the eventual aim of the Heritage Rushden, Higham & Wellingborough Railway to reopen the line to Higham Ferrers from its base at Rushden station.

== See also ==
- List of closed railway stations in Britain

Disused railways
Rushden; Line closed, station open	Midland Railway; Rushden, Higham & Wellingborough Railway	Terminus
Preceding station	Heritage railways	Following station
Proposed extension
Rushden towards Wellingborough	Rushden, Higham & Wellingborough Railway	Terminus
