= Wellingborough railway station =

Railway station in Northamptonshire, England

Wellingborough
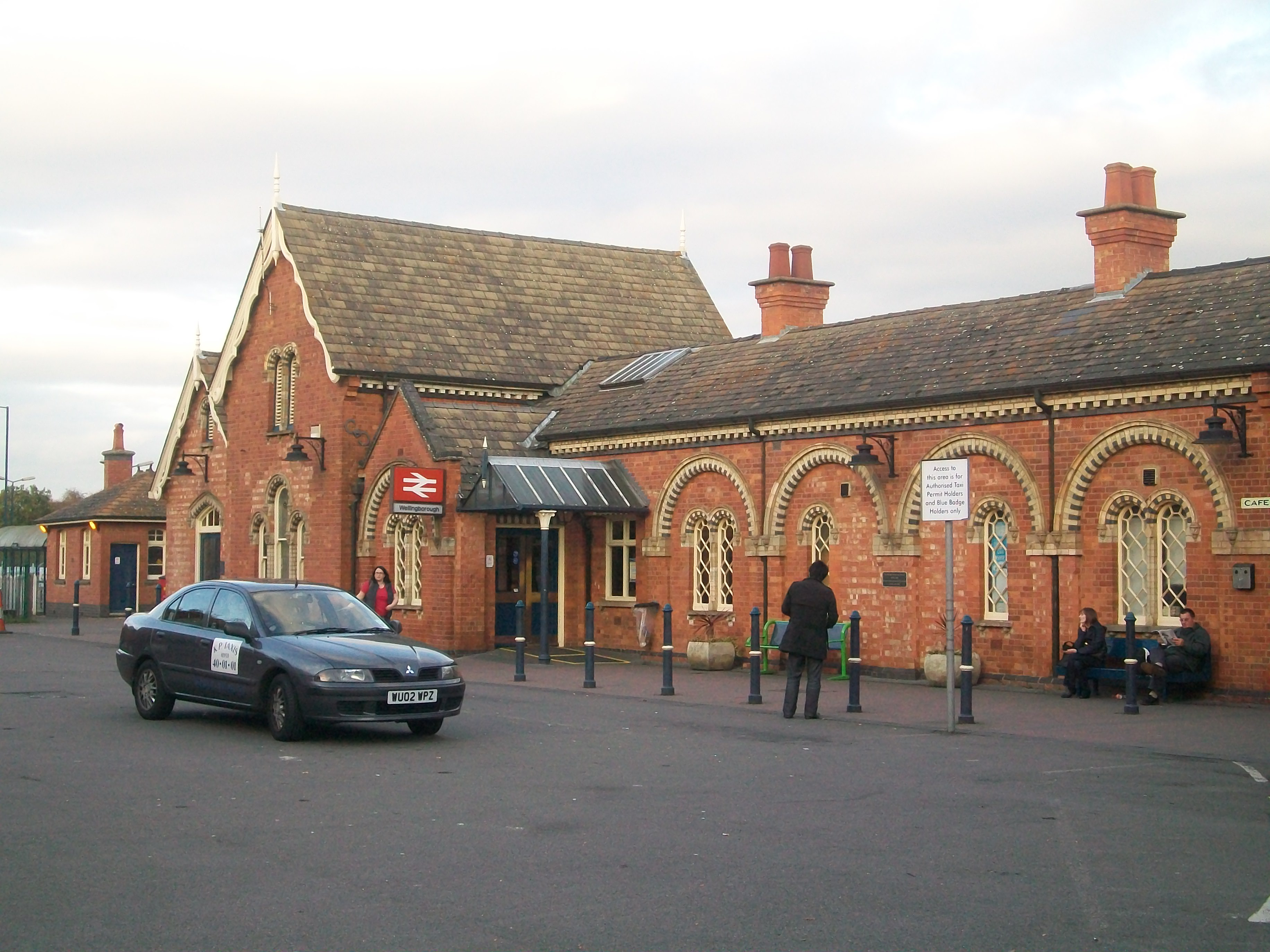
- The entrance to Wellingborough station

General information
- Location: Wellingborough, North Northamptonshire; England
- Coordinates: 52.304°N 0.6764°W
- Grid reference: SP903681
- Manager: East Midlands Railway
- Platforms: 4

Other information
- Station code: WEL
- Classification: DfT category C2

Key dates
- 1857: Opened as Wellingborough Midland Road

Passengers
- 2020/21: ▼0.186 million
- Interchange: ▼63
- 2021/22: ▲0.519 million
- Interchange: ▲91
- 2022/23: ▲0.739 million
- Interchange: ▲4,220
- 2023/24: ▲0.868 million
- Interchange: ▲4,735
- 2024/25: ▲0.981 million
- Interchange: ▲4,805

Listed Building – Grade II
- Feature: Wellingborough Railway Station
- Designated: 5 May 1981
- Reference no.: 1191880
Location
Notes
- Passenger statistics from the Office of Rail and Road

Wellingborough railway station (formerly Wellingborough Midland Road) is a Grade II listed station serving the market town of Wellingborough in Northamptonshire, England. It is on the Midland Main Line, around 65 miles (104 km) from London St Pancras. The station is operated by East Midlands Railway, which is also the primary operator serving the station with passenger services under the Luton Airport Express brand.

As well as Wellingborough itself, the station is also the closest to the towns of Higham Ferrers, Raunds, Irthlingborough and Rushden, although there is no direct public transport link from the station itself to any of these towns apart from Irthlingborough. It is also the nearest station to Rushden Lakes shopping centre.

Wellingborough station was used as a filming location for the film Kinky Boots, standing in for Northampton station. In late 2009, Wellingborough was made a penalty fare station by East Midlands Trains, which means a valid ticket or permit to travel must be shown when requested.

== History ==
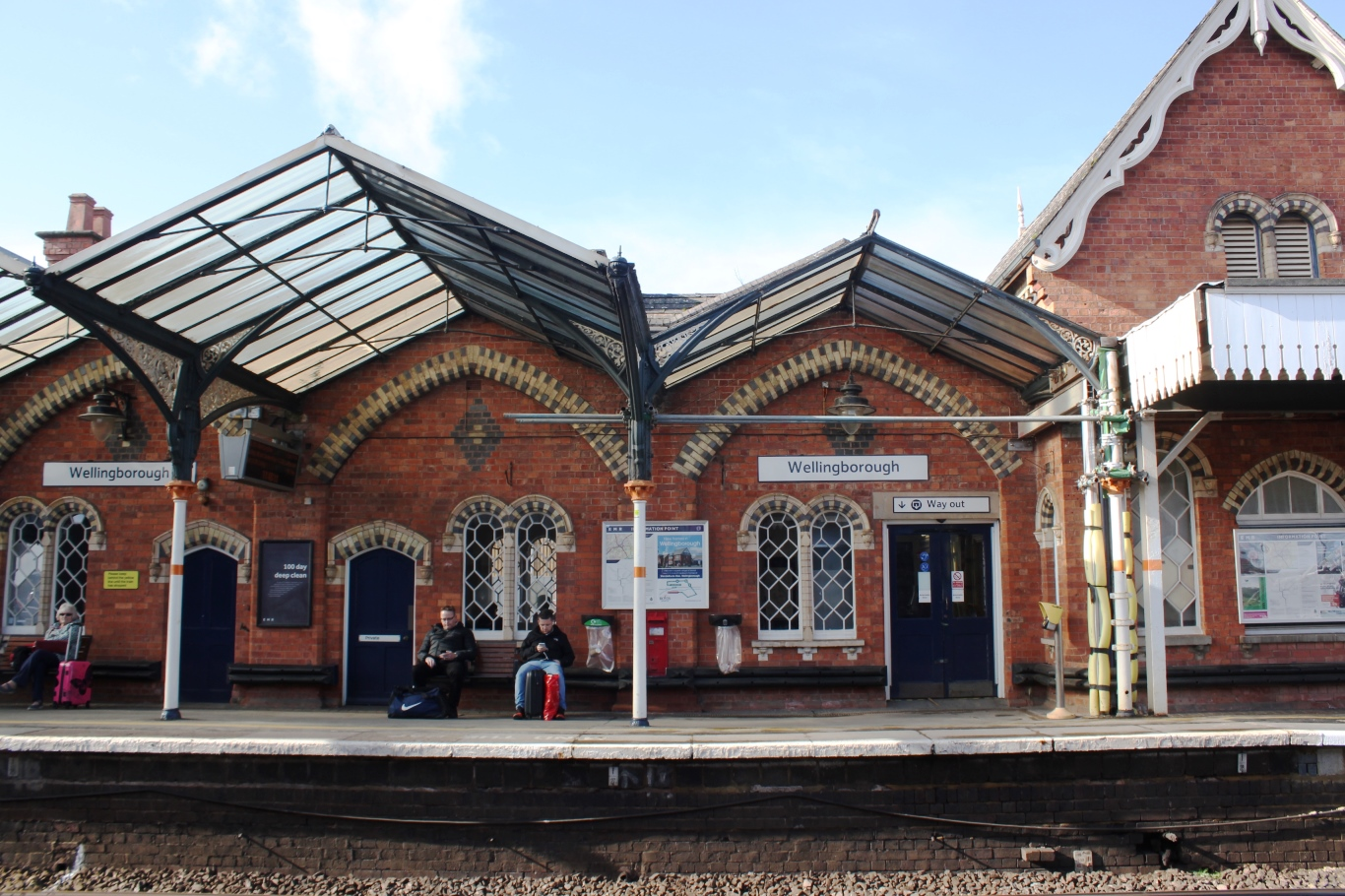
Charles Driver's decorative building

Wellingborough station was built by the Midland Railway in 1857, on its extension from Leicester to Bedford and Hitchin. At the time, the station was known as Wellingborough Midland Road to distinguish from one built by the LNWR in 1866, at Wellingborough London Road for the Northampton and Peterborough Railway, which closed in 1966. A curve linked the two stations from west to north.

The buildings, designed by C. H. Driver, still exist, though in altered form. Much of this occurred when the branch to Higham Ferrers was built in 1894, when the up main platform was substantially altered, removing the original canopies.

Wellingborough also had a large locomotive depot with two roundhouses; the first built 1868 and the second in 1872. The 1872 building, known as No. 2 Shed still exists, just to the north of the station at the far side of Mill Rd bridge; in 1966, it was no longer needed for railway purposes, and later became a warehouse for Whitworths and Totectors. On 2 September 1898, the station was the scene of a serious rail accident, when a trolley ran off the platform in front of a Manchester express train. The crew and five passengers were killed and sixty-five injured. When the roundhouses were no longer needed for railway purposes, they had other uses.

British Rail removed the fourth track between Kettering and Sharnbrook Junction in the 1980s, for cost cutting reasons, making platform 4 unused. Work started in 2019 on rebuilding the platform in preparation for reopening and reinstatement of the fourth track.

There were originally five platforms at Wellingborough station - Platforms 1 & 2 still exist as they were, platform 3 was the bay platform for Northampton trains, which ceased on 4 May 1964. The bay is still there, but fenced off from platform 2. In 1964, platform 4 (the then down slow platform) was re-numbered platform 3. Platform 5 was taken out of use when the Rushden and Higham Ferrers services ceased in 1959.

== General information ==
Wellingborough has four platforms. The station was formerly the junction for a branch to Higham Ferrers.

The station has the PlusBus scheme, where train and bus tickets can be bought together at a saving.

== Services ==
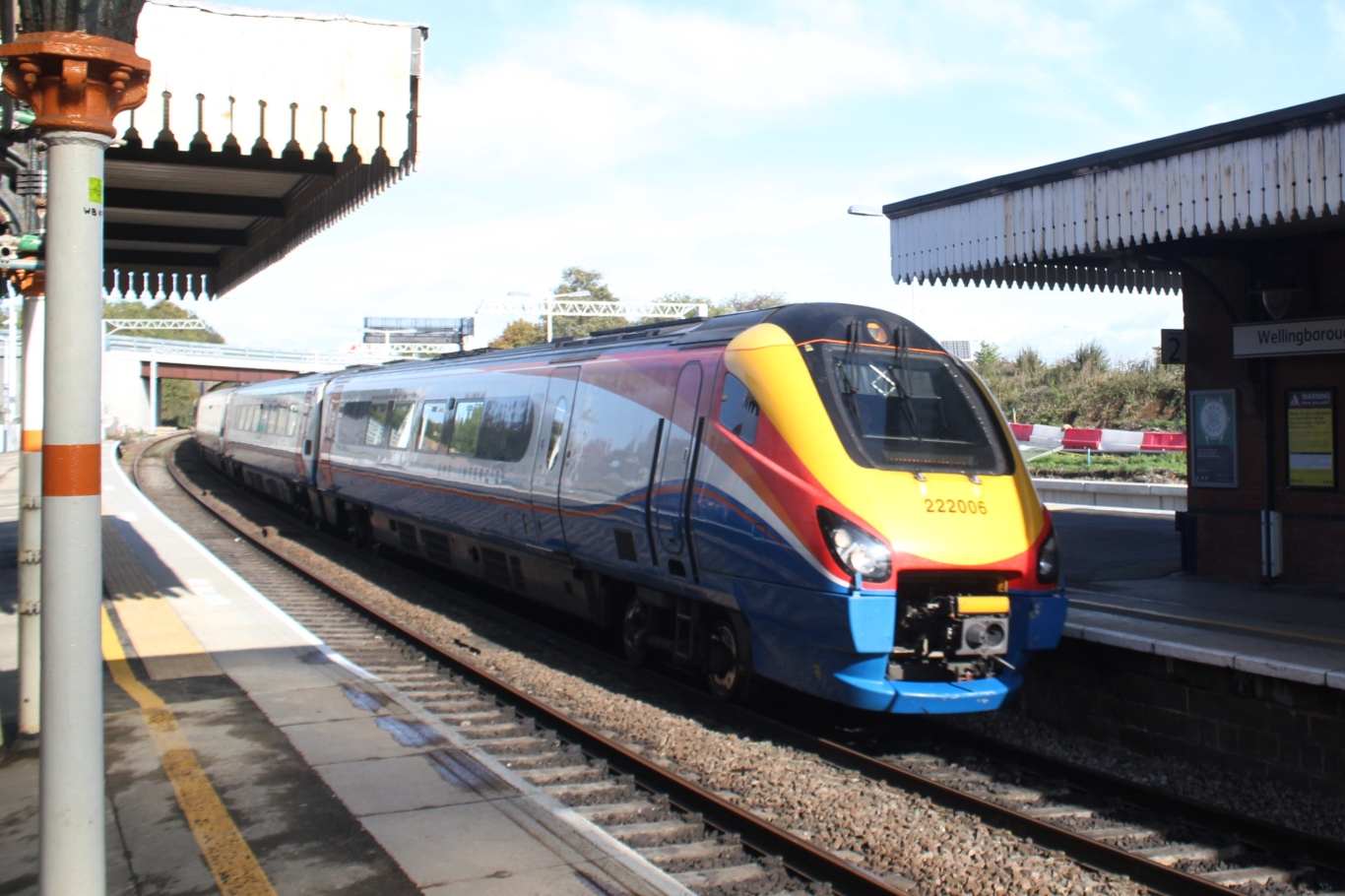
An old East Midlands Trains liveried formed of a class 222 in October 2019

A map of East Midlands Railway's InterCity and Connect services showing the current service pattern each hour

Services at Wellingborough are operated by East Midlands Railway under the Connect sub brand.

There is a half-hourly service to London St. Pancras and Corby, operated by Class 360 Desiro trains.

During peak hours, two Corby services go to and from Melton Mowbray and run using EMR Intercity trains.

As of May 2021, fast "EMR Intercity" services to Leicester, Nottingham and Sheffield run through the station at high speed but do not call at the station - apart from during peak hours and on Sunday mornings, when a limited number of services stop to provide connections north. Interchange with faster services at other times can be made at Kettering.

- 2tph to London St Pancras
- 2tph to Corby via Kettering

Preceding station	National Rail	Following station
Kettering	East Midlands Railway; London to Corby Connect	Bedford
Historical railways
Finedon; Line open, station closed	Midland Railway; Midland Main Line	Irchester; Line open, station closed
Disused railways
Finedon; Line open, station closed	Midland Railway; Midland Main Line	Wellingborough London Road; Line and station closed
Terminus	Midland Railway; Rushden, Higham & Wellingborough Railway	Rushden; Line closed and station open
Preceding station	Heritage railways	Following station
Proposed extension
Terminus	Rushden, Higham & Wellingborough Railway	Rushden towards Higham Ferrers

=== Travel times ===
Travel times to London, Corby, Melton Mowbray, Nottingham and Lincoln (from May 2009). All services are operated by East Midlands Railway.

- 51-5 mins to London St Pancras International
- 30 mins to Luton Airport Parkway
- 27 mins to Luton
- 13 mins to Bedford
- 7 mins to Kettering
- 16 mins to Corby
- 39 mins to Oakham Afternoon peak only
- 54 mins to Melton Mowbray Afternoon peak only
- 17 mins to Market Harborough
- 34 mins to Leicester
- 46 mins to Loughborough
- 58 mins to Beeston
- 1h 5 mins to Nottingham
- 2 hours to Lincoln Central Afternoon peak only

=== Proposed services ===
==== Manchester Piccadilly to London St Pancras ====
Grand Central applied in June 2026 for up to 5 daily direct return services between Manchester Piccadilly and London St Pancras calling at Stockport, Macclesfield, Congleton, Stoke‑on‑Trent, Uttoxeter, Derby, Loughborough, Leicester, Wellingborough and Luton Airport Parkway (set down/pick up only).

The proposal responds to a number of gaps and issues in the current railway offering. GC said its proposed offer “addresses a clear gap in the network” by linking the North West and East Midlands. It also argues that serving Uttoxeter would enable direct rail access to the UK’s largest theme park, Alton Towers, from London and Manchester, and has the resort’s backing.

GC also argues that its application “seeks to make pragmatic use” of off-peak Midland Main Line (MML) capacity, a route it said is “materially less constrained”.

The proposed service could start in May 2029.

Preceding station	National Rail	Following station
Leicester	Grand Central; Manchester-London; Proposed service	Luton Airport Parkway

== Development ==
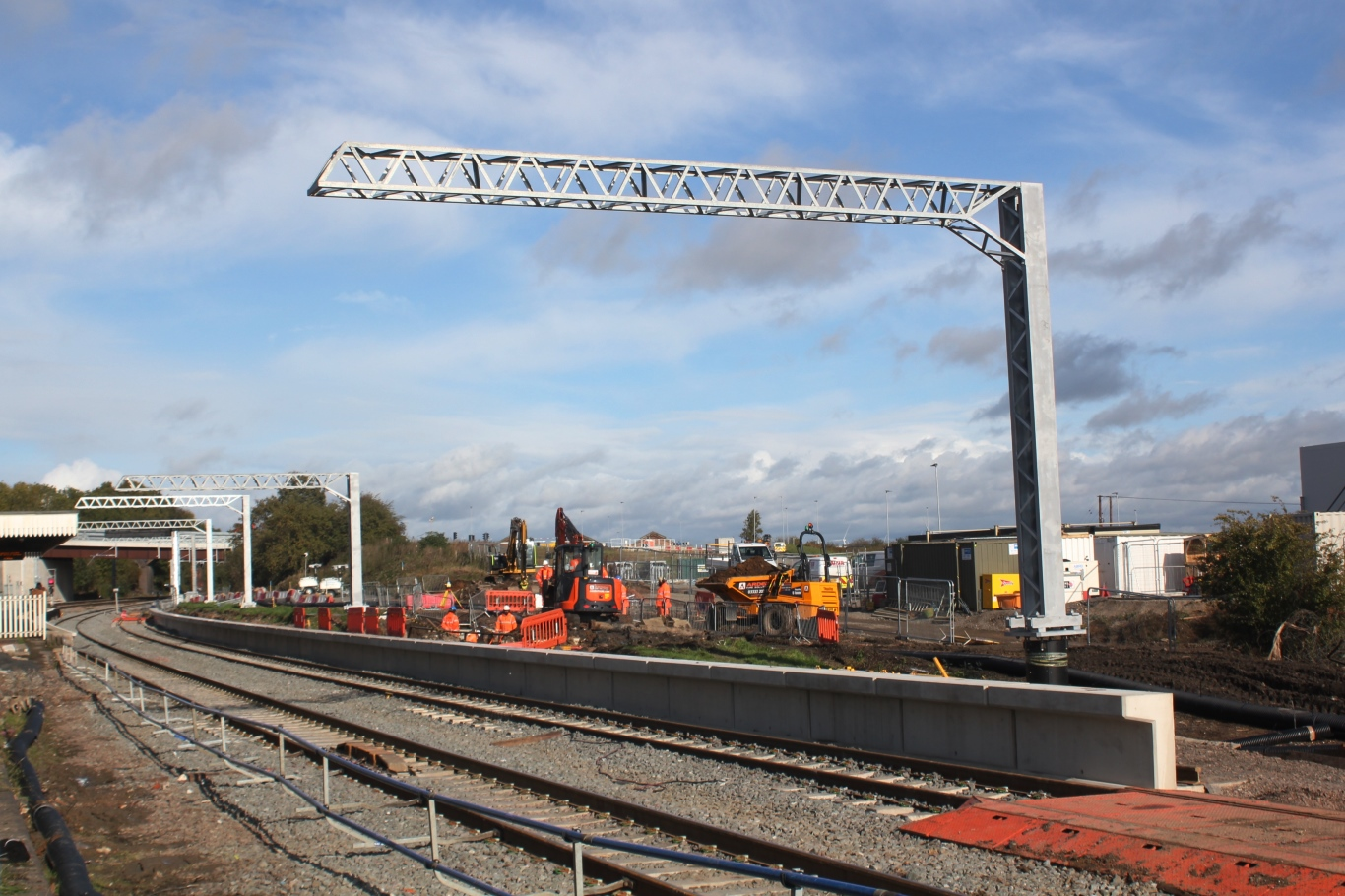
The new platform 4 under construction in 2019

=== Station improvements ===
As part of the Department for Transport's Access for all programme, Network Rail's Midland Main Line upgrade, and local housing developments, the station platforms have been upgraded, with improved accessibility access by providing lifts, replacing the flat barrow crossing at end of the platforms. In August 2010, the local council gave planning permission for Network Rail to build lifts and to fit new internal toilets one of the disused buildings in the station.

As a wider part of the Network Rail upgrade, the Midland Main Line between Bedford and Corby has been electrified, with the fourth track reinstalled between Sharnbrook Junction and Kettering, which resulted in the rebuilding and opening of Wellingborough's platform 4 in 2021. A station building on platform 4 is planned for access to the large Stanton Cross mixed-use development.

In March 2022, work to restore the platform canopies was completed.

=== Car parking ===
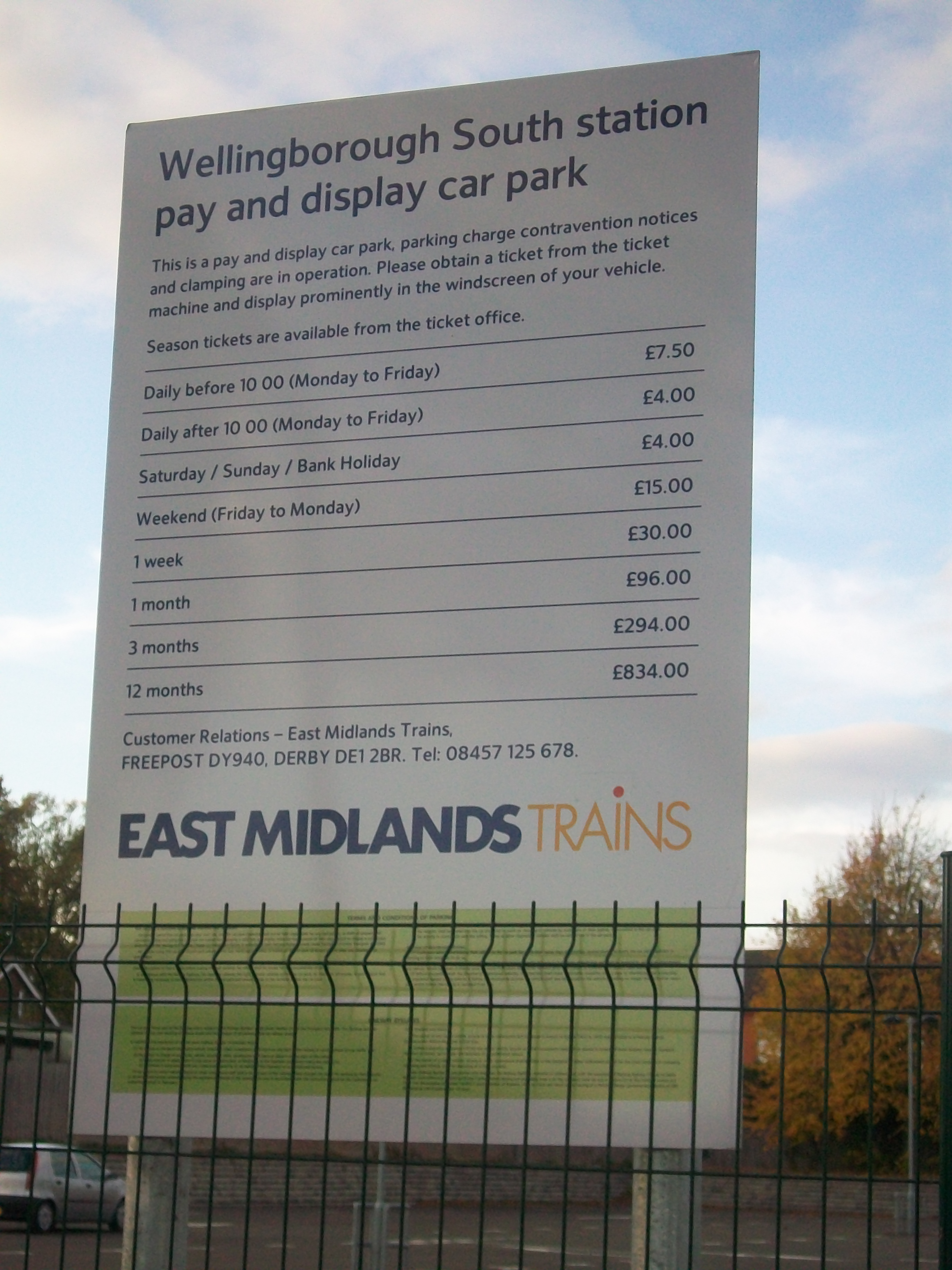
Wellingborough South Car Park sign.

The new 'South' car park has been built as a replacement for the 'North' car park which is still open. The replacement was built because of the Wellingborough East (Stanton Cross) development, as a new road bridge would start where the 'North' car park is situated and then go over the railway.
