= Rushden railway station =

Railway station in Northamptonshire, England

Coordinates: 52.29460°N 0.59818°W

Rushden
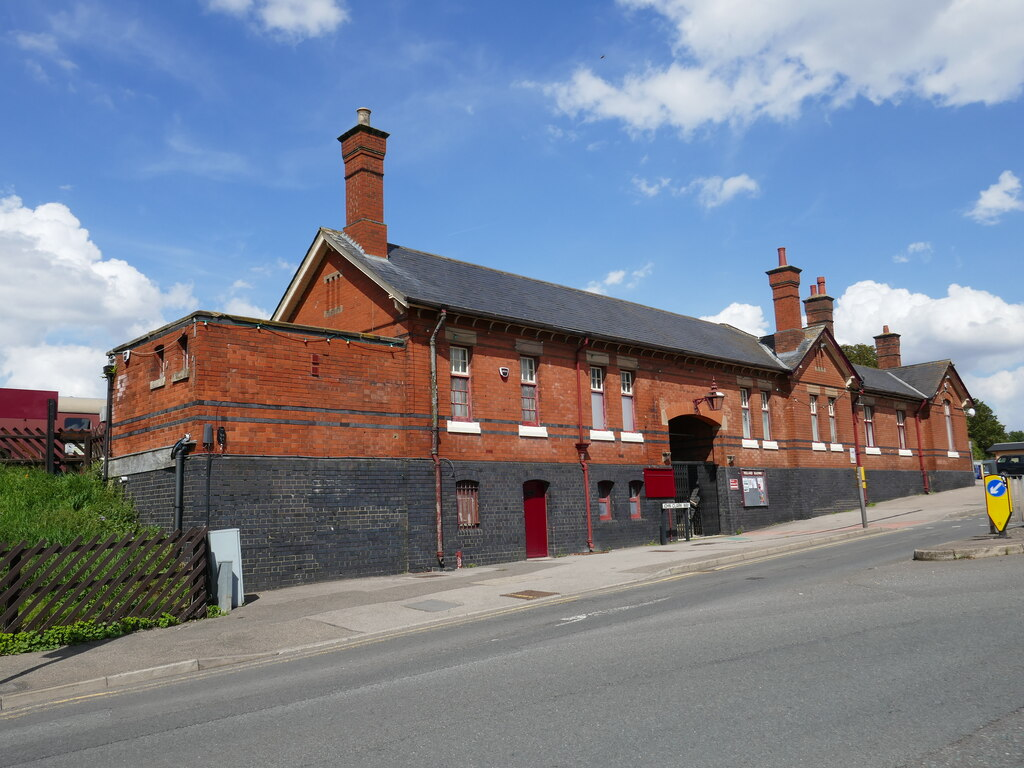
- Rushden station viewed from the road, in 2023

General information
- Location: Rushden, North Northamptonshire; England
- Platforms: 1

Other information
- Status: discussed by council of rushden

History
- Original company: Midland Railway
- Post-grouping: London, Midland and Scottish Railway

Key dates
- 1 May 1894: Opened
- 15 June 1959: Station closes to passengers
- 1 September 1969: Station closes completely
- 1996: Bought by Rushden Historical Transport Society
Location

Rushden railway station is a railway station that once served the town of Rushden in Northamptonshire, England. It is now a heritage station at the end of a short running line.

== History ==
The station was an intermediate stop on the Higham Ferrers branch line, originally established by the Midland Railway. It closed completely in 1969, British Rail having withdrawn passenger services ten years previously.

In 1996 the station was bought by the Rushden Historical Transport Society. Since then the station has been restored, and forms the headquarters of the society and includes the Rushden Station Railway Museum. The heritage railway now operates as the Rushden, Higham & Wellingborough Railway.

Since the late 1990s, Rushden Station bar has been home to a series of resident cats. The most recent station cats, Alfie and Thomas, have achieved minor fame on social media.

== Stationmasters ==
- Henry Pitt 1893 - 1914 (formerly station master at Finedon, afterwards station master at Cheltenham)
- John Charles Gregory 1914 - 1929 (formerly station master at Hitchin)
- C.V. Bunker from 1936 (formerly station master at Pye Bridge)
- Station Cat 1997 - 2006
- Alfie (station cat) 2007 - 2017
- Thomas (station cat) 2020 - present

== See also ==
- List of closed railway stations in Britain
- Rushden, Higham and Wellingborough Railway
- Rushden Parkway railway station

Preceding station	Heritage railways	Following station
Terminus	Rushden, Higham & Wellingborough Railway	Prospect Avenue Terminus
Proposed extension
Wellingborough Terminus	Rushden, Higham & Wellingborough Railway	Higham Ferrers Terminus
Disused railways
Wellingborough; Line closed, station open	Midland Railway; Rushden, Higham & Wellingborough Railway	Higham Ferrers; Line and station closed
