= Midland Main Line =

Principal railway line in England

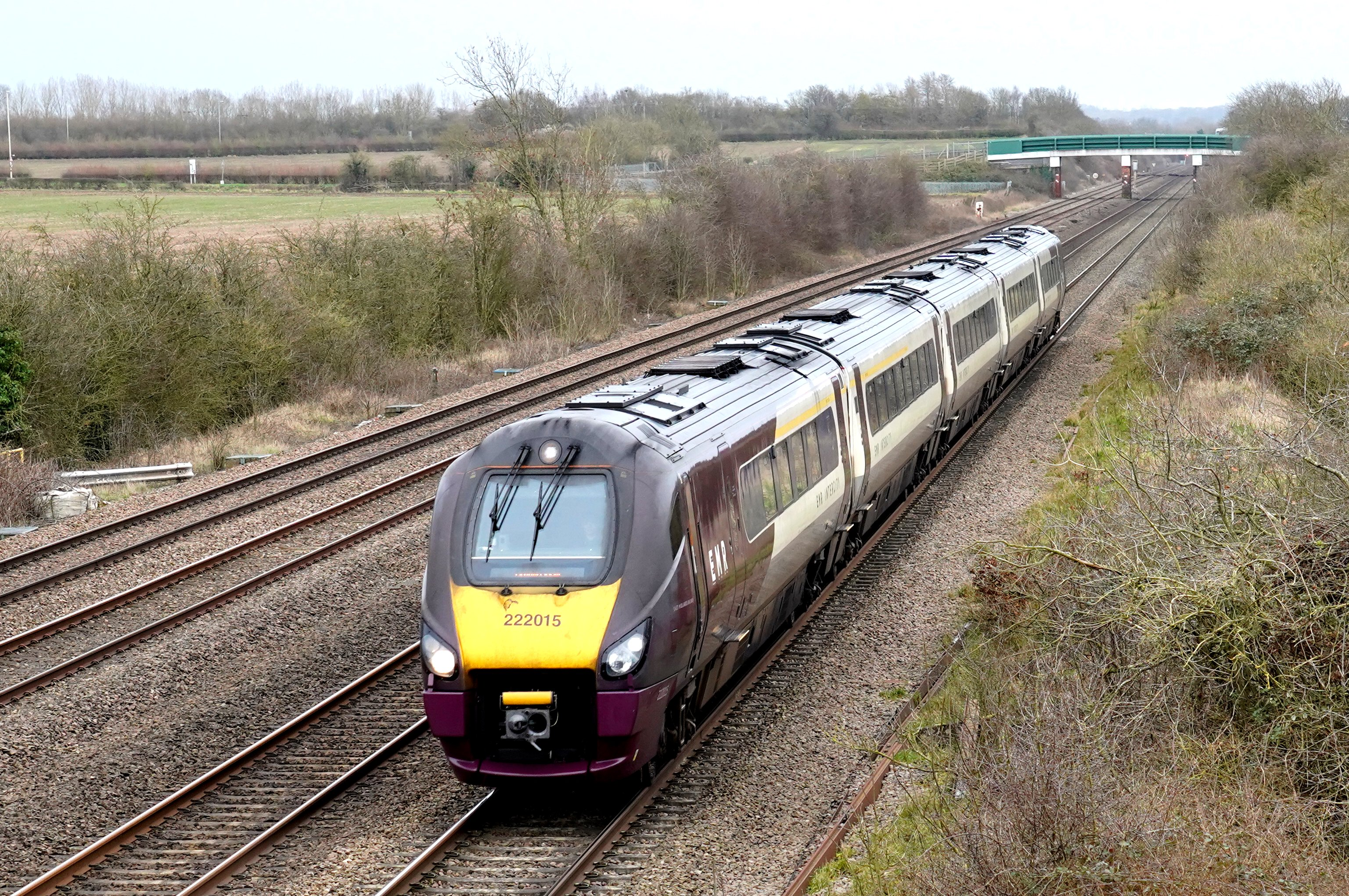
- An East Midlands Railway Class 222 Meridian passing Cossington in 2024

Overview
- Status: Operational
- Owner: Network Rail
- Locale: Greater London; East of England; East Midlands; Yorkshire and the Humber
- Termini: London St Pancras, Sheffield and Nottingham
- Stations: 37

Service
- Type: InterCity, commuter rail, regional rail and heavy rail
- System: National Rail
- Operators: East Midlands Railway; CrossCountry; Greater Thameslink Railway; TransPennine Express; Northern Trains; GB Railfreight; Freightliner; DB Cargo; Direct Rail Services
- Depots: Cricklewood; Derby Etches Park; Nottingham Eastcroft; Bedford Cauldwell Walk depot; Toton; Sheffield station depot; Neville Hill
- Rolling stock: Class 150 Sprinter; Class 156 Super Sprinter; Class 158 Express Sprinter; Class 170 Turbostar; Class 185 Desiro; Class 220 Voyager; Class 221 Super Voyager; Class 222 Meridian; Class 360 Desiro; Class 700 Desiro City; Class 810 Aurora

History
- Opened: In stages between 1830s and 1860s

Technical
- Num of tracks: 2–4
- Track gauge: 4 ft 8 1/2 in (1,435 mm) standard gauge
- Loading gauge: W6–W8, planned upgrade to W12
- Electrification: 25 kV 50 Hz AC OHLE (London St Pancras to Wigston)
- Operating speed: Maximum 125 mph (201 km/h)
Route map
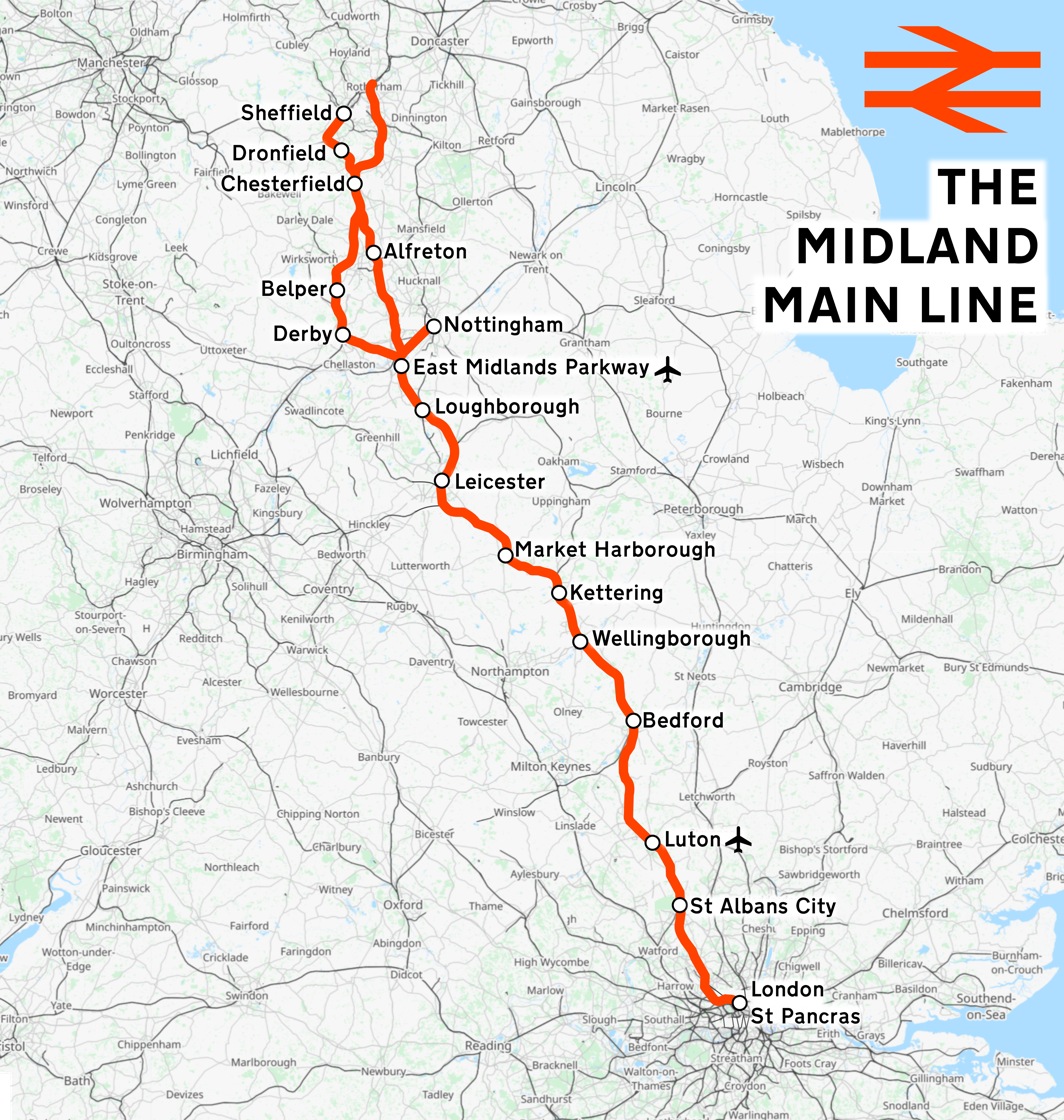
(Click to expand)

The Midland Main Line (MML) is a major railway line between London St Pancras and Sheffield, via Leicester, Derby and Chesterfield; a spur of the line terminates at Nottingham.

Express passenger services on the line are operated by East Midlands Railway. The line is electrified between St Pancras and Wigston, south of Leicester, and the section south of Bedford forms a branch of the northern half of the Thameslink network, with a semi-fast service to Brighton and other suburban services. A northern part of the route, between Derby and Chesterfield, also forms part of the Cross Country Route operated by CrossCountry. Tracks from Nottingham to Leeds, via Barnsley and Sheffield, are shared with Northern Trains. East Midlands Railway also operates regional and local services using parts of the line.

The Midland Main Line was undergoing a major upgrade of new digital signalling and full line electrification from London to Sheffield but this was indefinitely paused in 2025. High Speed 2 was planned to branch onto the Midland Main Line at East Midlands Parkway.

== History ==
=== Midland Counties early developments ===
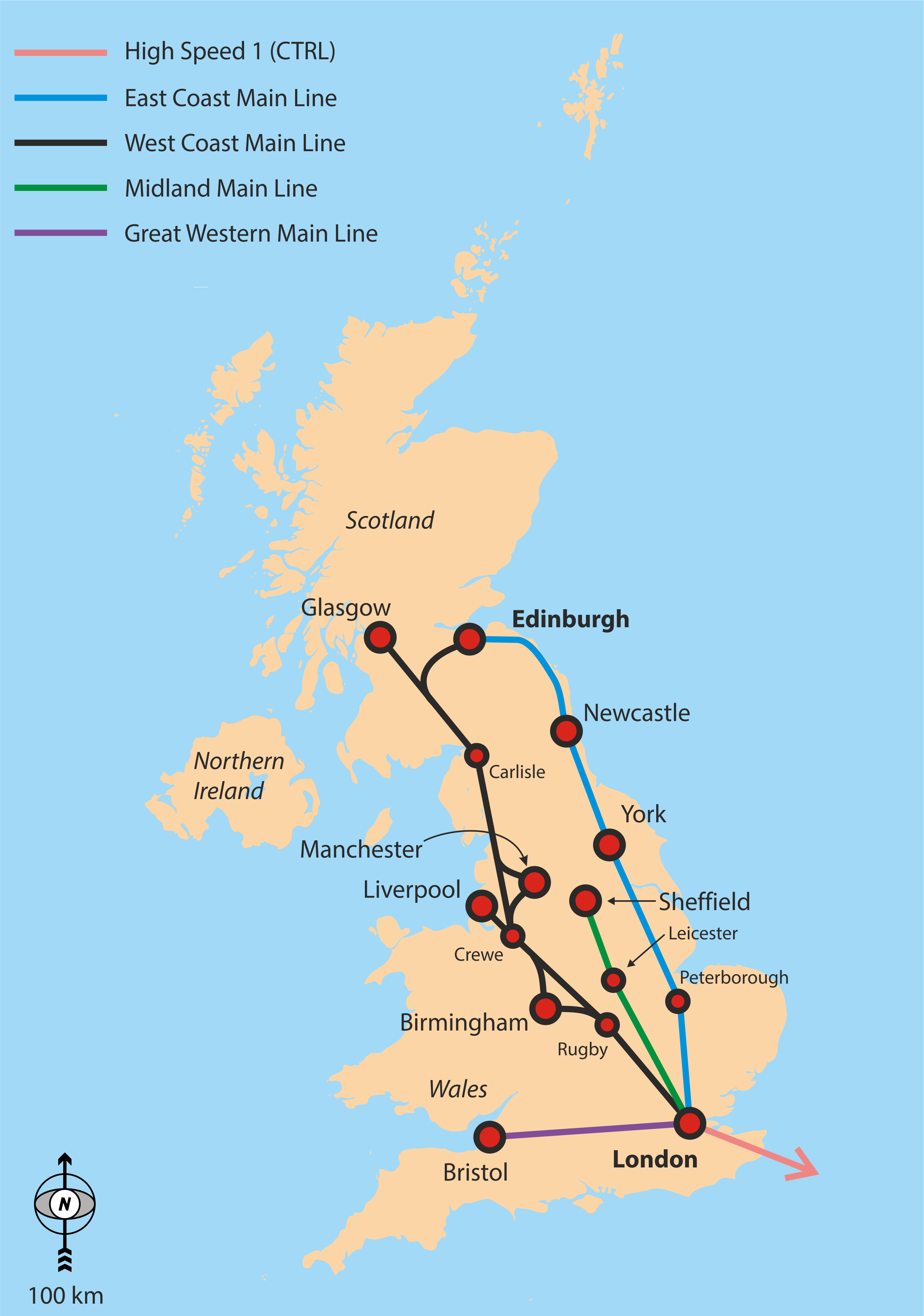
The Midland Main Line (green) in relation to other principal lines

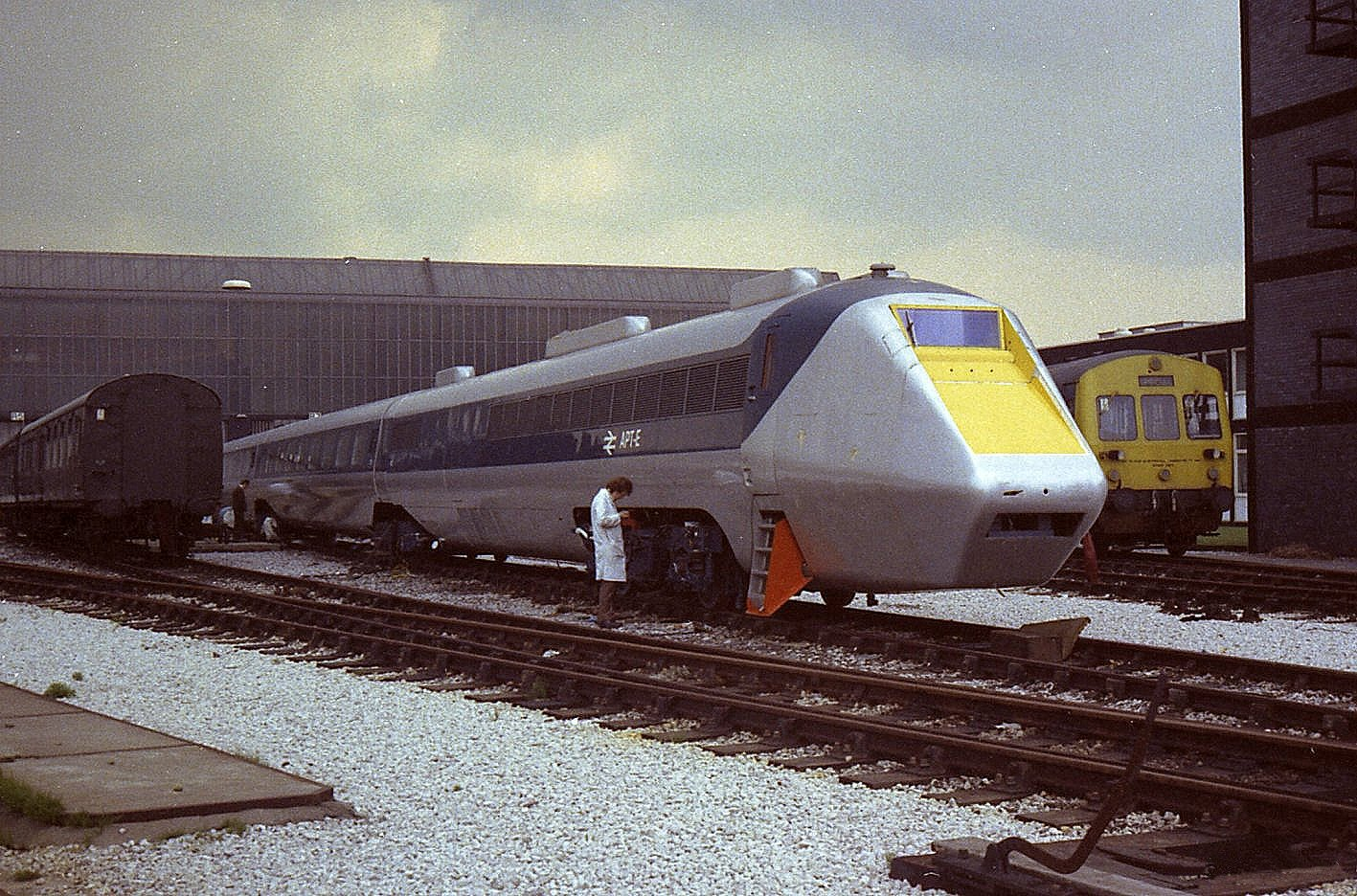
The British Rail APT-E, built at Derby rail technical centre and extensively tested on the Midland Main Line; its first run was on 25 July 1972 from Derby to Duffield

The Midland Main Line was built in stages between the 1830s and the 1870s. The earliest section was opened by the Midland Counties Railway between Nottingham and Derby on 4 June 1839. On 5 May 1840, the section of the route from Trent Junction to Leicester was opened.

The line at Derby was joined on 1 July 1840 by the North Midland Railway to Leeds Hunslet Lane, via Chesterfield, Rotherham Masborough, (Note: Quickly the Sheffield and Rotherham Railway ran its branch line to Sheffield Wicker) Swinton and Normanton.

On 10 May 1844, the North Midland Railway, the Midland Counties Railway and the Birmingham and Derby Junction Railway merged to form the Midland Railway.

=== Midland Main Line southern extensions ===
Without its own route to London, the Midland Railway relied upon a junction at Rugby, with the London and Birmingham Railway line for access to the capital at London Euston. By the 1850s, the junction at Rugby had become severely congested. The Midland Railway employed Thomas Brassey to construct a new route from Leicester to Hitchin, via Kettering, Wellingborough and Bedford. This gave access to London via the Great Northern Railway from Hitchin. The Crimean War resulted in a shortage of labour and finance; only £900,000 (equivalent to £87,991,494 in 2025) was available for the construction, approximately £15,000 for each mile (equivalent to £1,466,525 in 2025. To reduce construction costs, the railway followed natural contours, resulting in many curves and gradients. Seven bridges and one tunnel were required, with 60 ft (18 m) cuttings at Desborough and Sharnbrook. There are also major summits at Kibworth, Desbrough and at Sharnbrook, where a 1 in 119 gradient from the south over 3 miles (4.8 km) takes the line to 340 feet (104 m) above sea level. This route opened for coal traffic on 15 April 1857, goods on 4 May, and passengers on 8 May. The section between Leicester and Bedford is still part of the Midland Main Line.

While this took some of the pressure off the route through Rugby, the GNR insisted that passengers for London alight at Hitchin, buying tickets in the short time available, to catch a GNR train to finish their journey. James Allport arranged a seven-year deal with the GN to run into Kings Cross for a guaranteed £20,000 a year (equivalent to £1,960,000 in 2025). Through services to London were introduced in February 1858.

This line met with similar capacity problems at Hitchin as the former route via Rugby, so a new line was constructed from Bedford to St Pancras, via Luton which opened on 1 October 1868. The construction of the London extension cost £9 million (equivalent to £880 million in 2025).

As traffic built up, the Midland Railway opened a new deviation just north of Market Harborough on 26 June 1885, to remove the flat crossing of the Rugby and Stamford Railway.

=== Northernmost sections ===
Plans by the Midland Railway to build a direct line from Derby to Manchester were thwarted in 1863 by the builders of the Buxton line, who sought to monopolise on the West Coast Main Line.

In 1870, the Midland Railway opened a new route from Chesterfield to Rotherham which went through Sheffield via the Bradway Tunnel.

The mid-1870s saw the Midland line extended northwards through the Yorkshire Dales and Eden Valley, on what is now called the Settle–Carlisle Railway.

Before the line closures of the Beeching era, the lines to Buxton and via Millers Dale presented an alternative (and competing) main line from London to Manchester during most years, carrying named expresses such as The Palatine and the Blue Pullman diesel-powered Manchester – London service (the Midland Pullman). Express trains to Leeds and Scotland such as the Thames–Clyde Express mainly used the Midland's corollary Erewash Valley line, returned to it and then used the Settle–Carlisle line. Expresses to Edinburgh Waverley, such as The Waverley travelled through Corby and Nottingham.

=== Under British Railways and privatisation ===
Most Leicester-Nottingham local passenger trains were taken over by diesel multiple units from 14 April 1958, taking about 51 minutes between the two cities. When the Great Central Main Line closed in 1966, the Midland Main Line became the only direct main line rail link between London, the East Midlands and parts of South Yorkshire.

The Beeching cuts and electrification of the West Coast Main Line brought an end to the marginally longer London–Manchester service, via the Hope Valley Line and Sheffield.

In 1977, the Parliamentary Select Committee on Nationalised Industries recommended considering electrification of more of Britain's rail network; by 1979, BR presented a range of options that included electrifying the Midland Main Line from London to Yorkshire by 2000. By 1983, the line had been electrified from Moorgate to Bedford, but proposals to continue electrification to Nottingham and Sheffield were not implemented.

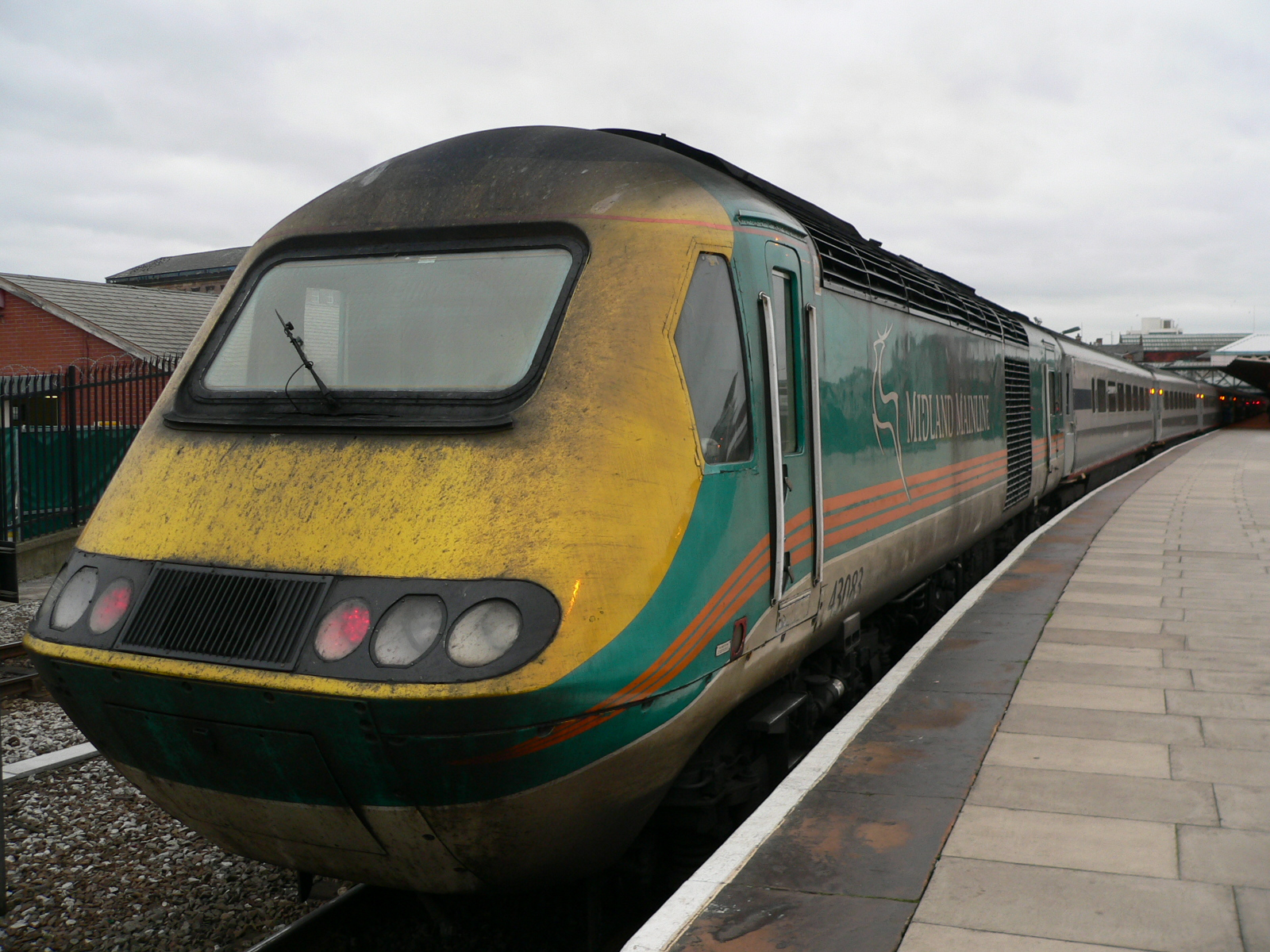
A Midland Mainline High Speed Train, introduced in 1983 by British Rail, at Nottingham in 2005

The introduction of the High Speed Train in May 1983, following the Leicester area resignalling, brought about an increase of the ruling line speed on the fast lines from 90 miles per hour (145 km/h) to 110 miles per hour (177 km/h).

Between 2001 and 2003, the line between Derby and Sheffield was upgraded from 100 miles per hour (161 km/h) to 110 miles per hour (177 km/h), as part of Operation Princess, the Network Rail-funded cross-country route upgrade.

In January 2009, a new station, East Midlands Parkway, was opened between Loughborough and Trent Junction, to act as a park-and-ride station for suburban travellers from East Midlands cities and to serve nearby East Midlands Airport.

Since then, 125 miles per hour (201 km/h) running has been introduced on extended stretches. Improved signalling, an increased number of tracks and the revival of proposals to extend electrification from Bedford to Sheffield have contributed to this. Much of this £70 million upgrade, including some line speed increases, came on-line on 9 December 2013 (see below). As of April 2025, the line has been electrified from London St Pancras to Wigston South Junction.

=== Network Rail route strategy for freight (2007) ===
Network Rail published a Route Utilisation Strategy for freight in 2007; over the coming years, a cross-country freight route will be developed enhancing the Birmingham to Peterborough Line, increasing capacity through Leicester, and remodelling Syston and Wigston junctions.

=== Network Rail 2010 route plan ===
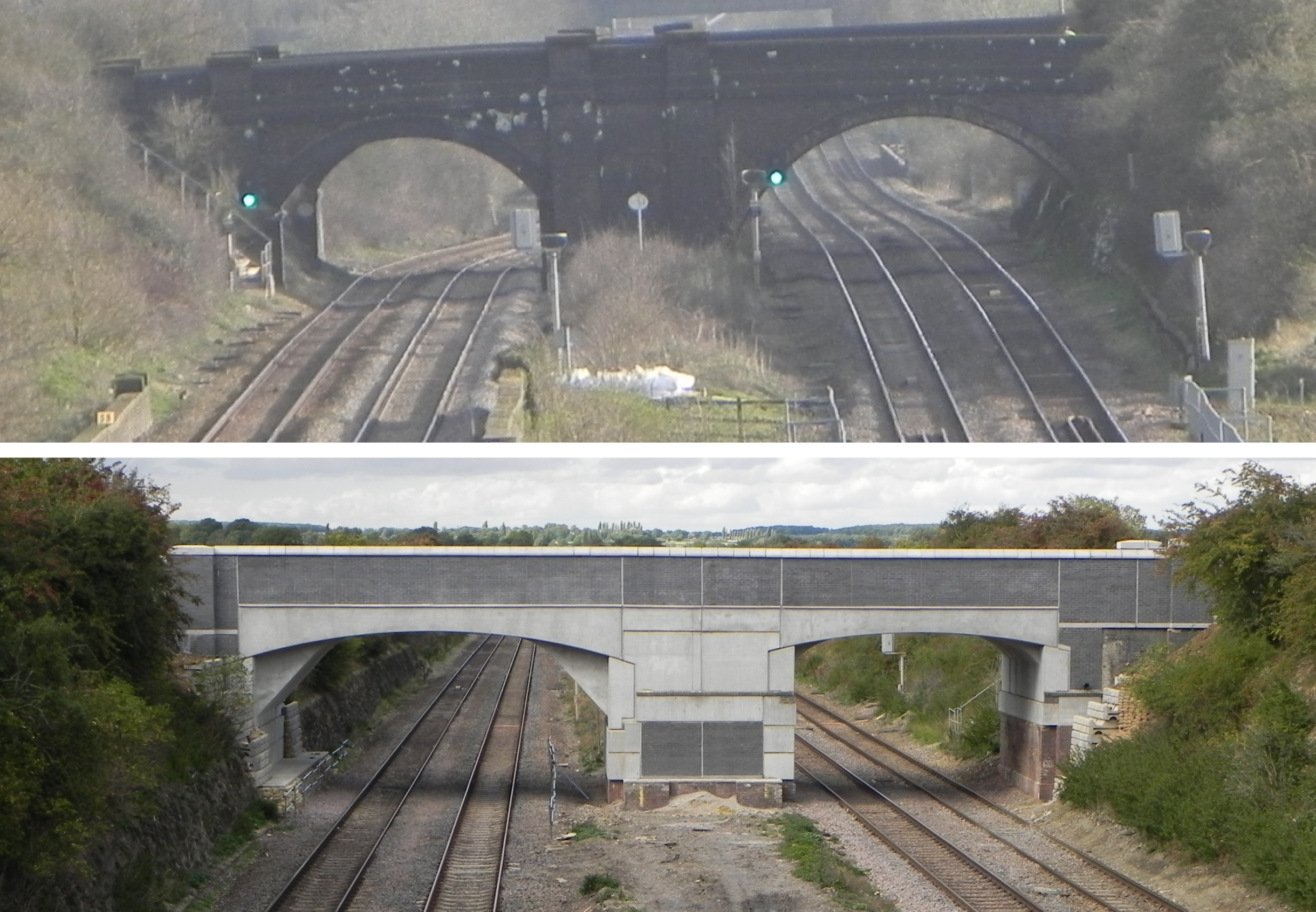
Bridges over the Midland Main Line have been replaced to allow greater clearances for electrification and larger rolling stock. Before (top) and after (bottom) the 2014 upgrade.

Traffic levels on the Midland Main Line are rising faster than the national average, with continued increases predicted. In 2006, the Strategic Rail Authority produced a Route Utilisation Strategy for the Midland Main Line to propose ways of meeting this demand; Network Rail started a new study in February 2008 and this was published in February 2010.

After electrification, three North Northamptonshire towns, Wellingborough, Kettering and Corby, now have an EMR Connect service into London St Pancras. North Northamptonshire is a major growth area, with over 7,400 new homes planned to be built in Wellingborough and 5,500 new homes planned for Kettering.

Highlights include:

- Work related to line speed increases, removing foot crossings and replacing with footbridges
- Capacity enhancements for freight
- Resignalling of the entire route, completed in 2016, when all signalling will be controlled by the East Midlands signalling centre in Derby
- Rebuilding Bedford and Leicester stations
- Accessibility enhancements at Elstree & Borehamwood, Harpenden, Loughborough, Long Eaton, Luton and Wellingborough by 2015
- Upgraded approach signalling (flashing yellow aspects) added at key junctions – Radlett, Harpenden and Leagrave allowing trains to traverse them at higher speeds
- Lengthening of platforms at Wellingborough, Kettering, Market Harborough, Loughborough, Long Eaton and Beeston stations as well as work related to the Thameslink Programme (see below)
- Realignment of the track and construction of new platforms to increase the permissible speed through Market Harborough station from 60 mph to 85 mph saving 30–60 seconds
- Electrification (see below)
- Redoubling the Kettering to Oakham line between Kettering North Junction and Corby; resignalling to Syston Junction via Oakham, allowing a half hourly London to Corby passenger service (from an infrastructure perspective) from December 2017; and creating additional paths for rail freight.

==== Thameslink Programme ====
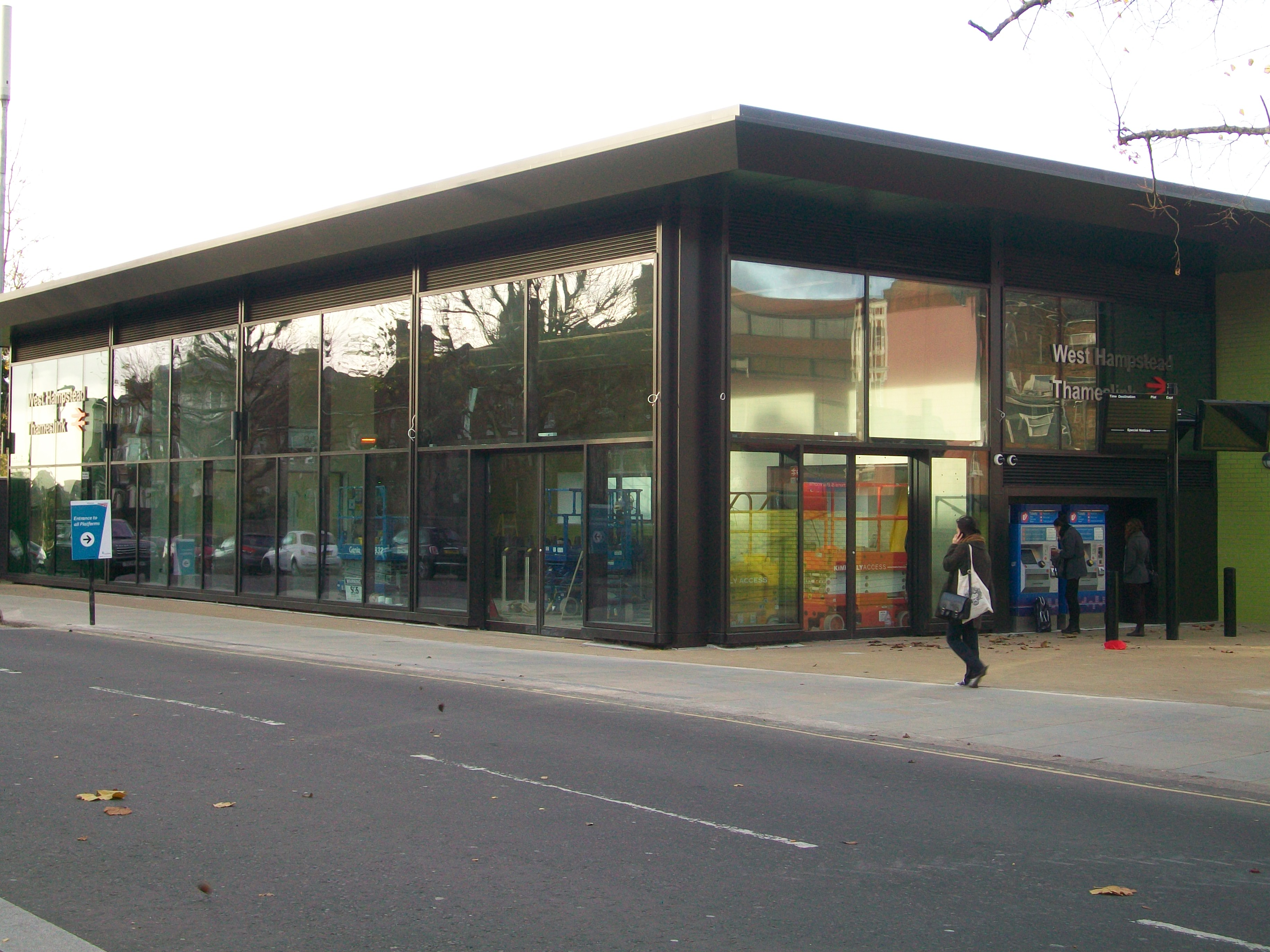
New station building at West Hampstead Thameslink

The Thameslink Programme has lengthened the platforms at most stations south of Bedford to 12-car capability. St Pancras, Cricklewood, Hendon and Luton Airport Parkway were already long enough, but bridges at Kentish Town mean it cannot expand beyond the current 8-car platform length. West Hampstead Thameslink has a new footbridge and a new station building. In September 2014, the current Thameslink Great Northern franchise was awarded and trains on this route are currently operated by Greater Thameslink Railway. In 2018, the Thameslink network expanded when some Southern services merged into it.

==== Station improvements ====
In 2013/14, Nottingham station was refurbished and the platforms restructured.

As part of the Stanton Cross development, Wellingborough station is to be expanded.

Ilkeston station, between Nottingham and Langley Mill, was opened on 2 April 2017.

Two new stations were planned:

- Brent Cross West between Cricklewood and Hendon, as part of the Brent Cross Cricklewood development in North London. It opened in December 2023.
- Wixams, between Flitwick and Bedford, as part of the new town. Construction has been pushed back repeatedly; it was first expected to be built by 2015, then for 2019, the government confirmed in April 2025 that main construction would begin in concert with the nearby Universal United Kingdom Theme Park in 2026, although groundwork had already begun by late 2024.

Some new stations have been proposed:

- Clay Cross between Chesterfield and Ambergate/Alfreton.
- Irchester (Rushden Parkway) between Wellingborough and Bedford.
- Ampthill between Bedford and Flitwick.

=== Extension of electrification ===
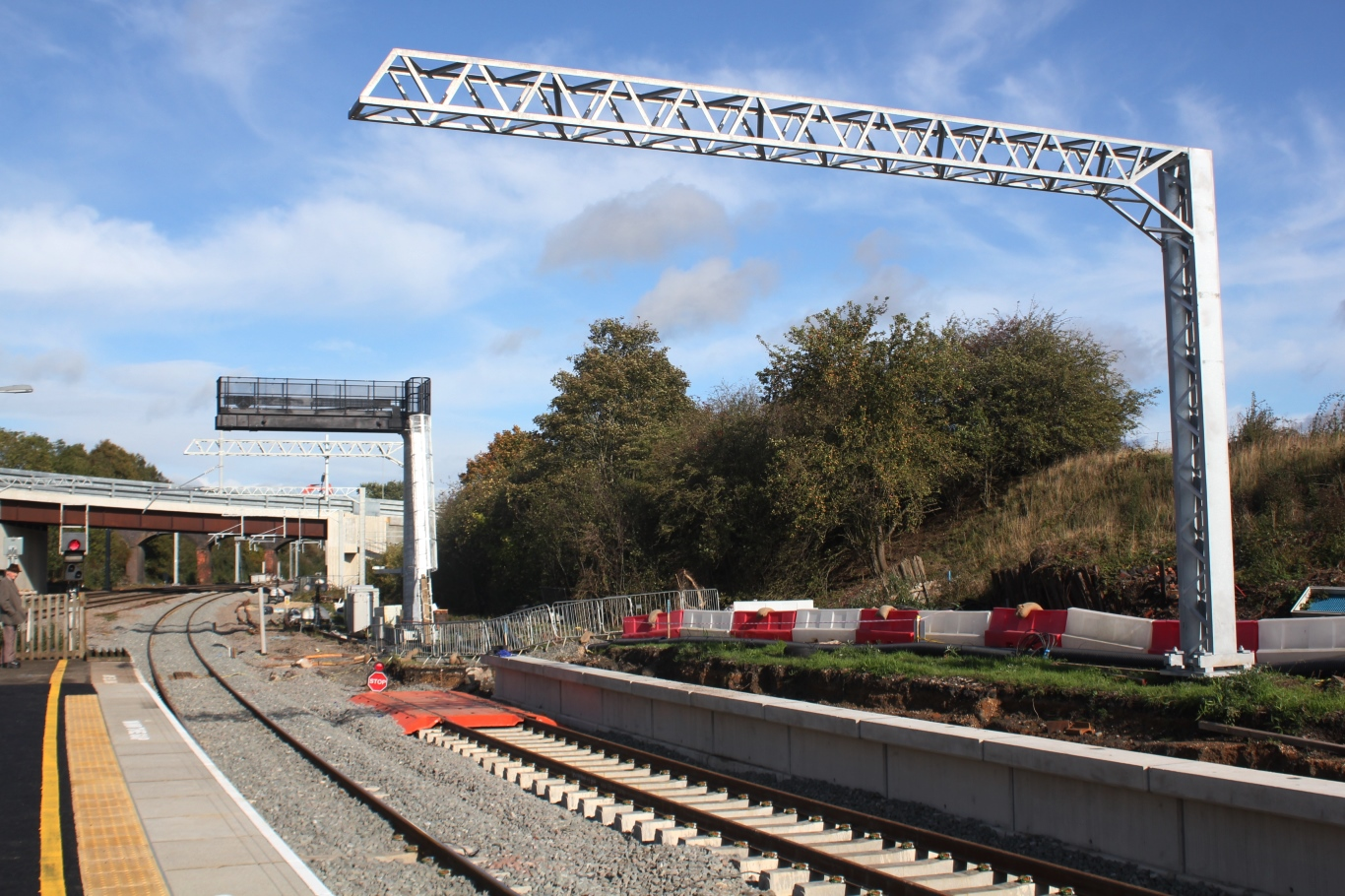
Electrification work and track being relaid at Wellingborough in 2019

Unlike the West and East Coast Main Lines, the Midland Main Line has not been electrified along its full length. The line was electrified as far as Bedford in the early 1980s, but services have relied on diesel traction beyond that.

In 2011, work commenced to extend the electrification, including to both Corby and Nottingham. Increasing costs initially saw this terminated at Kettering in 2017 but, in 2021, work began on extending electrification to Market Harborough and onwards to Wigston with plans to extend further to Sheffield. The section was energised on 28 July 2024 and completed testing in April 2025.

In May 2022, a briefing to contractors was released ahead of an invitation to tender for Midland Main Line Electrification project work to extend electrification to Nottingham and Sheffield. This scheme is expected to cost £1.3 billion.

In July 2025, the Department for Transport put plans for further electrification on hold indefinitely.

=== 2021 Integrated Rail Plan ===
In November 2021, the Government announced its Integrated Rail Plan for the North and Midlands, which made a number of proposals for the Midland Main Line. These included a commitment to complete the stalled electrification work, an upgrade to digital signalling and a connection to High Speed 2. The latter would see a junction built south of East Midlands Parkway, rather than the previous plan of an East Midlands Hub further north on the Toton sidings. This would allow HS2 services to connect to both Derby and Nottingham city centres directly, using the MML for access, which was a criticism of the previous HS2 eastern leg proposal.

== Route definition ==
The term Midland Main Line has been used from the late 1840s to describe any route of the Midland Railway on which express trains were operated.

It is first recorded in print in Bradshaw's Guide of 1848. In 1849, it begins to be mentioned regularly in newspapers such as the Derby Mercury.

In 1867, the Birmingham Journal uses the term to describe the new railway running into St Pancras station.

In 1868, the term was used to describe the Midland Railway main route from north to south through Sheffield and also on routes to Manchester, Leeds and Carlisle.

Under British Rail, the term was used to define the route between St Pancras and Sheffield but, since then, Network Rail has restricted it in its description of Route 19 to the lines between St Pancras and Chesterfield.

== Accidents ==
- 26 September 1860: Bull bridge accident; bridge collapse
- 2 September 1861: Kentish Town rail accident; collision
- 2 September 1898: Wellingborough rail accident; derailment due to post trolley on track
- 1 February 2008: Barrow upon Soar rail accident
- 19 June 2026: 2026 Bedford train collision

== Train operating companies ==
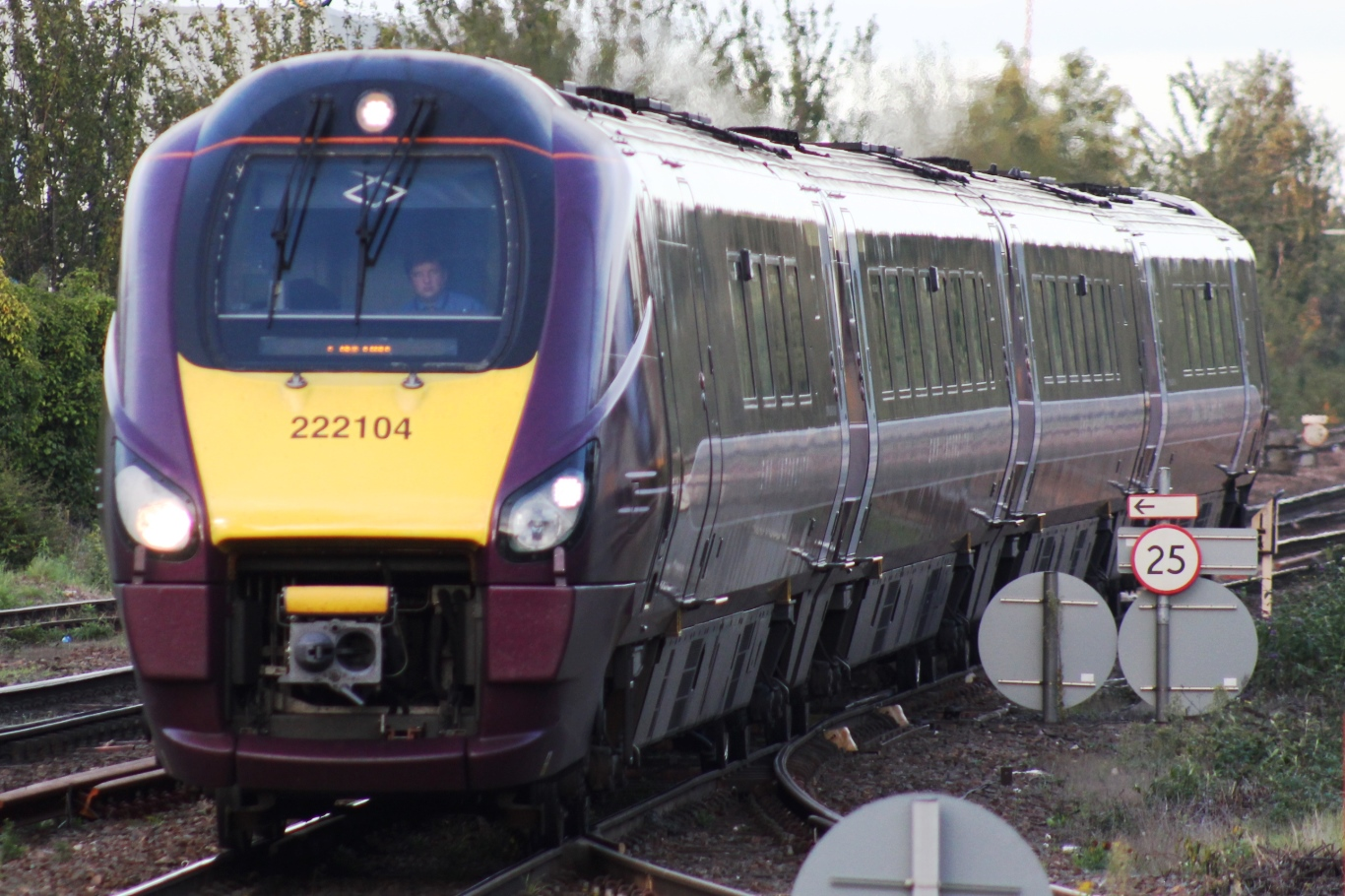
An East Midlands Railway Class 222 at Leicester

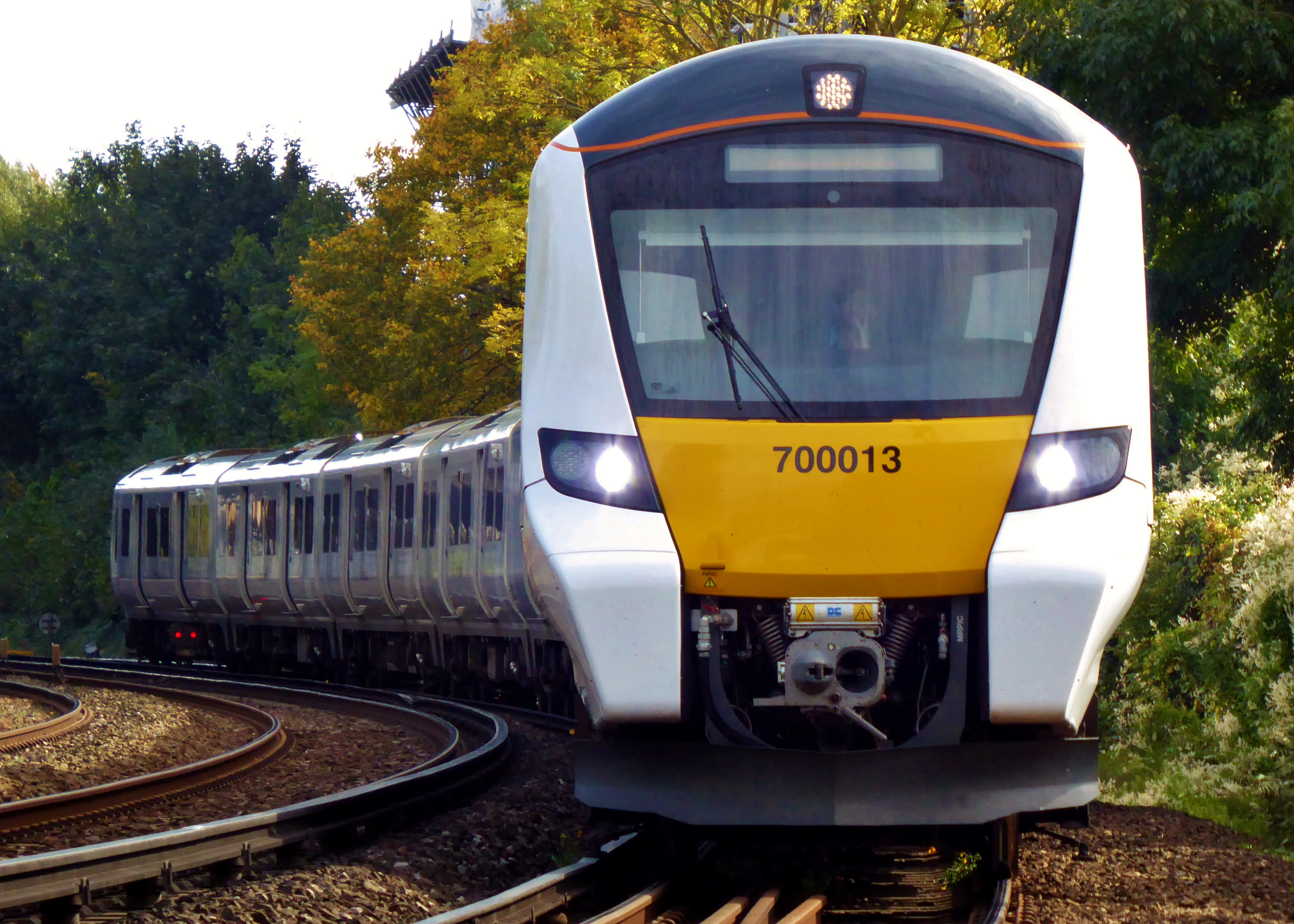
A Thameslink Class 700

=== East Midlands Railway ===
The principal operator is East Midlands Railway (EMR), which operates four InterCity trains every hour from London St Pancras, with two trains per hour to both Nottingham and Sheffield. EMR uses Class 222 Meridian and Class 810 Aurora trains in various carriage formations for its InterCity services.

EMR also operates a twice-hourly commuter service from London St Pancras to Corby, which is branded as EMR Connect, using Class 360 Desiro electric multiple units.

=== Greater Thameslink Railway ===
Greater Thameslink Railway provides frequent, 24-hour services south of Bedford, as part of its Thameslink route to London Bridge, Gatwick Airport, Brighton and Sutton, using 8- and 12-car Class 700 electric multiple units.

=== CrossCountry ===
CrossCountry runs an hourly service between Derby and Sheffield, on its route between the South West and North East of England; there are also twice-hourly services between Nottingham and Derby, continuing to Birmingham New Street and Cardiff Central.

=== Northern Trains ===
Northern Trains runs an hourly service from Leeds to Nottingham, via Barnsley and Alfreton.

=== TransPennine Express ===
TransPennine Express also operates in the Sheffield area, with its Liverpool Lime Street to Cleethorpes service.

== Route description ==
The cities, towns and villages served by the MML are listed below; stations in bold have a high usage. This table includes the historical extensions to Manchester (where it linked to the West Coast Main Line) and Carlisle (via Leeds, where it meets with the East Coast Main Line).

Network Rail groups all lines in the East Midlands and the route north as far as Chesterfield and south to London as Route 19. The actual line extends beyond this into routes 10 and 11.

=== London to Nottingham and Sheffield (Network Rail Route 19) ===
Station	Village/town/city and county	Ordnance Survey grid reference	Year opened	Step free access	No. of platforms	Usage 2015/16 (millions)	Branches and loops
**London St Pancras**	St Pancras, London		1868		15	▲31.724	High Speed 1 diverges north of St Pancras
Kentish Town	Kentish Town, London		1868		4	▲2.844	Branch from to Gospel Oak to Barking line north of station
West Hampstead Thameslink	West Hampstead, London		1871		4	▲3.710	
Cricklewood	Cricklewood, London		1868		4	▼1.057	Dudding Hill Line diverges north of Cricklewood
Brent Cross West	Brent Cross, London		2023		4		Dudding Hill Line diverges south of Brent Cross
Hendon	Hendon, London		1868		4	▼1.178	
Mill Hill Broadway	Mill Hill, London	grid reference TQ213918	1868		4	▼1.949	
Elstree & Borehamwood	Borehamwood, Hertfordshire		1868		4	▼3.382	
Radlett	Radlett, Hertfordshire	grid reference TQ164998	1868		4	▼1.188	
**St Albans City**	St Albans, Hertfordshire	grid reference TL155070	1868		4	▼7.451	
Harpenden	Harpenden, Hertfordshire	grid reference TL137142	1868		4	▲3.337	
Luton Airport Parkway	Luton, Bedfordshire	grid reference TL105205	1999		4	▲3.188	
**Luton**	Luton, Bedfordshire	grid reference TL092216	1868		5	▲3.626	
Leagrave	Leagrave, Luton, Bedfordshire	grid reference TL061241	1868		4	▲1.915	
Harlington	Harlington, Bedfordshire	grid reference TL034303	1868		4	▲0.336	
Flitwick	Flitwick, Bedfordshire	grid reference TL034350	1870		4	▲1.480	
**Bedford** Midland	Bedford, Bedfordshire	grid reference TL041497	1859		5	▲3.830	Marston Vale line diverges south of Bedford
Wellingborough	Wellingborough, Northamptonshire	grid reference SP903681	1857		4	▲0.969	
Kettering	Kettering, Northamptonshire	grid reference SP863780	1857		4	▲1.042	Oakham–Kettering line diverges north of Kettering at Glendon Jun
	**via Corby & diversion route**						
Corby	Corby, Northamptonshire	grid reference SP891886	2009		1	▲0.278	Oakham–Kettering line
Oakham	Oakham, Rutland	grid reference SK856090	1848		2	▲0.213	Birmingham–Peterborough line
Melton Mowbray	Melton Mowbray, Leicestershire	grid reference SK752187	1848		2	▲0.266	
	**Main Line via Market Harborough**						
Market Harborough	Market Harborough, Leicestershire	grid reference SP741874	1850		2	▲0.870	
**Leicester**	Leicester, Leicestershire	grid reference SK593041	1840		4	▲5.247	Birmingham to Peterborough Line diverges south of Leicester at Wigston Junction
Syston	Syston, Leicestershire	grid reference SK621111	1994		1	▲0.210	Birmingham to Peterborough Line diverges north of Syston
Sileby	Sileby, Leicestershire	grid reference SK602151	1994		2	▲0.123	
Barrow-upon-Soar	Barrow-upon-Soar, Leicestershire	grid reference SK577172	1994		2	▲0.098	
Loughborough	Loughborough, Leicestershire	grid reference SK543204	1872		3	▼1.298	
East Midlands Parkway	Ratcliffe-on-Soar, Nottinghamshire (for East Midlands Airport)	grid reference SK496296	2007		4	▲0.306	Trent Junction to Clay Cross Junction via Derby (the original line), the Nottingham branch, and the Erewash Valley Line each diverge north of East Midlands Parkway
	**Via Derby**						
Long Eaton	Long Eaton, Derbyshire	grid reference SK481321	1888		2	▼0.660	Cord south of Long Eaton to the Nottingham branch
Spondon	Spondon, Derby, Derbyshire	grid reference SK397351	1839		2	▼0.026	
**Derby**	Derby, Derbyshire	grid reference SK362355	1839		6	▲3.767	Cross Country Route and Crewe to Derby Line diverges south of Derby
Duffield	Duffield, Derbyshire	grid reference SK345435	1841		3	▲0.061	
Belper	Belper, Derbyshire	grid reference SK348475	1840		2	▲0.225	
Ambergate	Ambergate, Derbyshire	grid reference SK348516	1840		1	▼0.042	Derwent Valley line diverges at Ambergate Junction
	**Via Nottingham**						
Attenborough	Attenborough, Nottinghamshire	grid reference SK518346	1856		2	▼0.112	
Beeston	Beeston, Nottinghamshire	grid reference SK533362	1839		2	▼0.574	
**Nottingham Midland**	Nottingham, Nottinghamshire	grid reference SK574392	1904		7	▲7.200	Northbound trains reverse towards Langley Mill. Others pass through the station onto the Robin Hood Line, Grantham line or Lincoln line.
	**Via Erewash Valley (bypassing or calling at Nottingham)**						
Ilkeston	Ilkeston, Derbyshire		2017		2		
Langley Mill	Langley Mill, Derbyshire	grid reference SK449470	1847		2	▲0.116	Erewash Valley and Trent Nottingham lines rejoin south of Langley Mill.
Alfreton	Alfreton, Derbyshire	grid reference SK422561	1862		2	▲0.283	
	**Clay Cross Junction to Leeds**						
Chesterfield	Chesterfield, Derbyshire	grid reference SK388714	1840		3	▲1.731	Trent Junction to Clay Cross via Derby and Erewash Valley lines rejoin together south of Chesterfield.
Dronfield	Dronfield, Derbyshire	grid reference SK354784	1981		2	▲0.200	Hope Valley Line diverges north of Dronfield
**Sheffield**	Sheffield, South Yorkshire	grid reference SK358869	1870		9	▲9.213	Hope Valley Line diverges south of Sheffield; Sheffield to Lincoln Line diverges north of Sheffield
Meadowhall Interchange	Sheffield, South Yorkshire	grid reference SK390912	1990		4 NR	▼2.138	Hallam and Penistone Lines diverges at Meadowhall
	**Via Doncaster**						
**Doncaster**	Doncaster, South Yorkshire	grid reference SE571032	1838		8	▲3.752	Connects to the East Coast Main Line south of Doncaster
	**Bypassing Doncaster**						
Wakefield Westgate	Wakefield, West Yorkshire	grid reference SE327207	1867		2	▲2.519	Connects with the East Coast Main Line south of Wakefield Westgate
**Leeds**	Leeds, West Yorkshire	grid reference SE299331	1938		17	▲29.724	Leeds City lines

==== Tunnels, viaducts and major bridges ====
Major civil engineering structures on the Midland Main Line include the following.

Tunnels, viaducts and major bridges on the Midland Main Line
Railway Structure	Length	Distance from London St Pancras International	ELR	Location
East Bank Tunnel	80 yards (73 m)	158 miles 05 chains – 158 miles 01 chains	TJC1	South of Sheffield station
Bradway Tunnel	1 mile 266 yards (1,853 m)	153 miles 61 chains – 152 miles 49 chains	TJC1	North of Dronfield station
Unstone Viaduct (River Drone)	6 chains (120 m)	149 miles 75 chains – 149 miles 69 chains	TJC1	Between Dronfield and Chesterfield stations
Former Broomhouse Tunnel			TJC1	Between Dronfield and Chesterfield stations
Whitting Moor Road Viaduct		148 miles 45 chains	TJC1	Between Dronfield and Chesterfield stations
Alfreton Tunnel	840 yards (770 m)	135 miles 50 chains – 135 miles 11 chains (via Toton)	TCC	Erewash Valley Line between Alfreton and Langley Mill stations
Cromford Canal		132 miles 67 chains (via Toton)	TCC	Erewash Valley Line between Alfreton and Langley Mill stations
Erewash Canal		128 miles 09 chains (via Toton)	TCC	Erewash Valley Line south of Langley Mill station
Clay Cross Tunnel	1 mile 24 yards (1,631 m)	147 miles 22 chains – 146 miles 21 chains	SPC8	Between Chesterfield and Belper stations
River Amber		140 miles 40 chains	SPC8	Between Chesterfield and Belper stations
Wingfield Tunnel	261 yards (239 m)	139 miles 59 chains – 139 miles 47 chains	SPC8	Between Chesterfield and Belper stations
Toadmoor Tunnel	129 yards (118 m)	138 miles 12 chains – 138 miles 07 chains	SPC8	Between Chesterfield and Belper stations
River Derwent / Broadholme Viaducts	6 chains (120 m), 7 chains (140 m)	136 miles 47 chains – 136 miles 41 chains, 136 miles 18 chains – 136 miles 11 chains	SPC8	Between Chesterfield and Belper stations
Swainsley Viaduct (River Derwent)	4 chains (80 m)	134 miles 61 chains – 134 miles 57 chains	SPC8	Between Belper and Duffield stations
Milford Tunnel	855 yards (782 m)	134 miles 25 chains – 133 miles 67 chains	SPC8	Between Belper and Duffield stations
Burley Viaduct (River Derwent)	4 chains (80 m)	131 miles 58 chains – 131 miles 54 chains	SPC8	Between Duffield and Derby stations
Nottingham Road Viaduct	3 chains (60 m)	128 miles 43 chains – 128 miles 40 chains	SPC8	Between Duffield and Derby stations
River Derwent Viaduct	3 chains (60 m)	128 miles 06 chains – 128 miles 03 chains	SPC8	Between Duffield and Derby stations
Trent Viaduct	11 chains (220 m)	119 miles 08 chains – 118 miles 77 chains	SPC6	Between Long Eaton and East Midlands Parkway station
Redhill Tunnels	154 yards (141 m), 170 yards (160 m)	118 miles 74 chains – 118 miles 66 chains	SPC6	Between Long Eaton and East Midlands Parkway station
River Soar		112 miles 74 chains	SPC5	Between East Midlands Parkway and Loughborough stations
Flood openings	2 chains (40 m)	112 miles 60 chains – 112 miles 58 chains	SPC5	Between East Midlands Parkway and Loughborough stations
Hermitage Brook Flood Openings	3 chains (60 m)	111 miles 41 chains – 111 miles 38 chains	SPC5	South of Loughborough station
River Soar		109 miles 55 chains	SPC5	North of Barrow-upon-Soar station
River Wreak		104 miles 60 chains	SPC5	South of Sileby station
Knighton Tunnel	104 yards (95 m)	98 miles 07 chains – 98 miles 02 chains	SPC4	South of Leicester station
Knighton Viaduct	4 chains (80 m)	97 miles 34 chains – 97 miles 30 chains	SPC4	South of Leicester station
Wellingborough Viaducts (River Ise)	6 chains (120 m)	64 miles 57 chains – 64 miles 51 chains	SPC2	South of Wellingborough station
Irchester Viaducts (River Nene)	7 chains (140 m)	63 miles 67 chains – 63 miles 60 chains	SPC2	South of Wellingborough station
Sharnbrook Tunnel (Slow line only)	1 mile 100 yards (1,701 m)	60 miles 04 chains – 59 miles 00 chains	WYM	Between Wellingborough and Bedford stations
Sharnbrook Viaducts	9 chains (180 m)	56 miles 25 chains – 56 miles 16 chains	SPC2	Between Wellingborough and Bedford stations
Radwell Viaducts	143 yards (131 m)	55 miles 03 chains – 54 miles 76½ chains	SPC2	Between Wellingborough and Bedford stations
Milton Ernest Viaducts	8 chains (160 m)	54 miles 25 chains – 54 miles 17 chains	SPC2	Between Wellingborough and Bedford stations
Oakley Viaducts	6 chains (120 m)	53 miles 35 chains – 53 miles 29 chains	SPC2	Between Wellingborough and Bedford stations
Clapham Viaducts (River Ouse)	6 chains (120 m)	52 miles 04 chains – 51 miles 78 chains	SPC2	Between Wellingborough and Bedford stations
Bromham Viaducts (River Ouse)	7 chains (140 m)	50 miles 79 chains – 50 miles 72 chains	SPC2	Between Wellingborough and Bedford stations
River Great Ouse Viaduct	5 chains (100 m)	49 miles 38 chains – 49 miles 33 chains	SPC1	Between Bedford and Flitwick stations
Ampthill Tunnels	715 yards (654 m)	42 miles 52 chains – 42 miles 19 chains	SPC1	Between Bedford and Flitwick stations
Hyde/Chiltern Green Viaduct (River Lea)	6 chains (120 m)	26 miles 72 chains – 26 miles 66 chains	SPC1	South of Luton Airport Parkway station
Elstree Tunnels	1,058 yards (967 m)	12 miles 06 chains – 11 miles 38 chains	SPC1	South of Elstree & Borehamwood station
Stoneyfield/Deans Brook Viaduct	4 chains (80 m)	10 miles 36 chains – 10 miles 32 chains	SPC1	Between Elstree & Borehamwood and Hendon stations
Welsh Harp/Brent Viaduct (River Brent)	10 chains (200 m)	6 miles 31 chains – 6 miles 21 chains	SPC1	South of Hendon station
Belsize Slow Tunnel	1 mile 107 yards (1,707 m)	3 miles 34 chains – 2 miles 29 chains	SPC1	Between West Hampstead Thameslink and Kentish Town stations
Belsize Fast Tunnel	1 mile 11 yards (1,619 m)	3 miles 32 chains – 2 miles 33 chains	SPC1	Between West Hampstead Thameslink and Kentish Town stations
Lismore Circus Tunnel	110 yards (100 m)	2 miles 22 chains – 2 miles 17 chains	SPC1	Between West Hampstead Thameslink and Kentish Town stations
Hampstead Tunnel	44 yards (40 m)	1 mile 76 chains – 1 mile 74 chains	SPC1	
Camden Road Tunnels	308 yards (282 m)	1 miles 13 chains – 0 miles 79 chains	SPC1	South of Kentish Town station
Canal Tunnels	820 yards (750 m)	0 miles 0 chains – 0 miles 0 chains		Connecting to ECML at Belle Island Junction

==== Line-side monitoring equipment ====
Line-side train monitoring equipment includes hot axle box detectors (HABD) and wheel impact load detectors (WILD) ‘Wheelchex’, these are located as follows.

Line-side monitoring equipment on the Midland Main Line
Name / Type	Line	Location (distance from St. Pancras)	Engineers Line Reference
Dore HABD (out of use?)	Down Main	154 miles 72 chains	TJC1
Belper HABD (to replace Duffield HABD)	Up Main	134 miles 70 chains	SPC8
Duffield Junction HABD (removal planned)	Up Main	132 miles 63 chains	SPC8
Langley Mill HABD	Up Erewash Fast, Up & Down Erewash Slow	129 miles 27 chains	TCC
Loughborough HABD	Up Fast, Up Slow	111 miles 05 chains	SPC5
Barrow-upon-Soar HABD	Down Fast, Down Slow	108 miles 72 chains	SPC5
Thurmaston Wheelchex	Down Fast, Up Fast, Up & Down Slow	101 miles 78 chains	SPC5
East Langton HABD	Down Main, Up Main	86 miles 20 chains	SPC3
Harrowden Junction HABD	Down Fast, Up & Down Slow	67 miles 36 chains	SPC3
Oakley HABD	Up Fast, Up Slow	53 miles 60 chains	SPC2
Chiltern Green HABD	Down Fast, Down Slow	27 miles 69 chains	SPC1
Napsbury HABD	Up Fast, Up Slow	18 miles 00 chains	SPC1

=== Ambergate Junction to Manchester ===
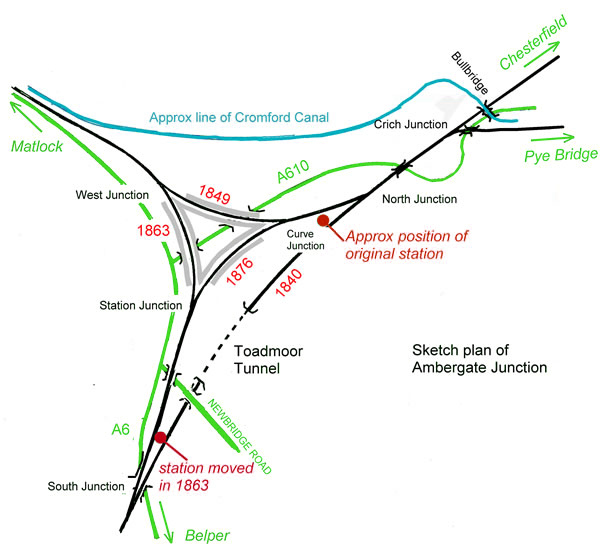
The complex network of road and rail around Ambergate Junction, formerly where Manchester expresses left the main line

For marketing and franchising, this is no longer considered part of the Midland Main Line: see Manchester, Buxton, Matlock and Midlands Junction Railway

The line was once the Midland Railway's route from London St Pancras to Manchester, branching at Ambergate Junction along the Manchester, Buxton, Matlock and Midlands Junction Railway, now known as the Derwent Valley line. In days gone by, it featured named expresses such as The Palatine. Much later in the twentieth century, it carried the Midland Pullman.

Town/City	Station	Ordnance Survey grid reference
Ambergate	Ambergate	
Whatstandwell	Whatstandwell	
Cromford	Cromford	
Matlock Bath	Matlock Bath	
Matlock	Matlock	
Closed section stations
Darley Dale	Darley Dale	
Rowsley	Rowsley	
Bakewell	Bakewell	
Hassop	Hassop	
Great Longstone	Great Longstone for Ashford	
Monsal Dale	Monsal Dale	
Millers Dale	Millers Dale	
Blackwell Mill	Blackwell Mill	
Buxton	Buxton	
Peak Forest	Peak Forest	
Chapel-en-le-Frith	Chapel-en-le-Frith Central	
Now part of the Hope Valley Line or other lines
Chinley	Chinley	
Bugsworth	Buxworth (Now Closed)	
New Mills	New Mills Central	
Strines	Strines	
Marple	Marple	
Romiley	Romiley	
Bredbury	Bredbury	
Brinnington	Brinnington	
Reddish	Reddish North	
Gorton	Ryder Brow	
Belle Vue/Gorton	Belle Vue	
Stockport	Stockport Tiviot Dale	
Manchester	Manchester Central (Now Closed)	

This line was closed in the 1960s between Matlock and Buxton, severing an important link between Manchester and the East Midlands] which has never been satisfactorily replaced by any mode of transport. A section of the route remains in the hands of the Peak Rail preservation group, operating between Matlock and Rowsley to the north.

=== Leeds to Carlisle ===
For marketing and franchising, this is no longer considered part of the Midland Main Line: see Settle–Carlisle Railway.

A geographical representation of the aborted Midland Main Line diversion through the West Riding, which would have put Bradford on a through line and provided a direct connection to Scotland (existing lines are shown in black and the diversion in red)

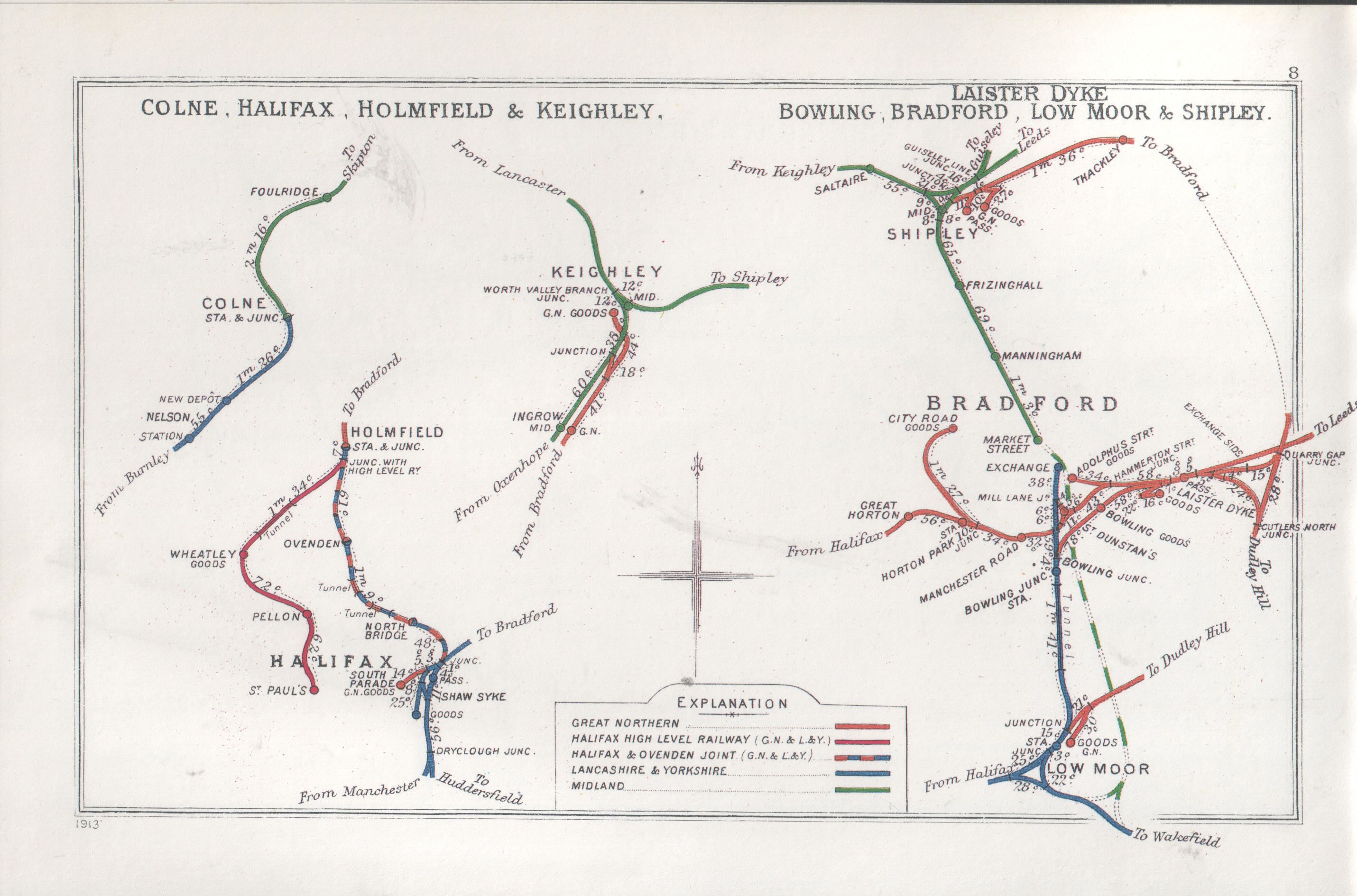
A map showing the proposed Midland line into Bradford

World War I prevented the Midland Railway from finishing its direct route through the West Riding to join the Settle and Carlisle line (which would have cut six miles from the journey and avoided the need for reversal at Leeds).

The first part of the Midland's West Riding extension from the main line at Royston to Dewsbury was opened before the war; however, the second part of the extension was not completed. This involved a viaduct at Dewsbury over the River Calder, a tunnel under Dewsbury Moor and a new approach railway into Bradford from the south at a lower level than the existing railway (a good part of which was to be in tunnel) leading into Bradford Midland or Bradford Forster Square.

The 500 yards (460 m) gap between the stations at Bradford still exists. Closing it today would also need to take into account the different levels between the two Bradford stations, a task made easier in the days of electric rather than steam traction, allowing for steeper gradients than possible at the time of the Midland's proposed extension.

Two impressive viaducts remain on the completed part of the line between Royston Junction and Dewsbury, as a testament to the Midland's ambition to complete a third direct Anglo–Scottish route. The line served two goods stations and provided a route for occasional express passenger trains before its eventual closure in 1968.

The failure to complete this section ended the Midland's hopes of being a serious competitor on routes to Scotland and finally put beyond all doubt that Leeds, not Bradford, would be the West Riding's principal city. Midland trains to Scotland therefore continued to call at Leeds before travelling along the Aire Valley to the Settle and Carlisle line. From Carlisle, they then travelled onwards via either the Glasgow and South Western or Waverley Route. In the past, the line had named expresses, such as the Thames–Clyde Express and The Waverley.

The route takes the following route:

- **Leeds** along the Airedale line
  - Apperley Junction for the Wharfedale line
- Shipley: with the triangular junction for the branch line to **Bradford Forster Square**
- Saltaire
- Bingley
- Crossflatts
- **Keighley**
  - for the Worth Valley Branch junction to Oxenhope.
- Steeton & Silsden
- Cononley
- **Skipton**
  - Settle Junction for the line to Morecambe
    - Giggleswick
    - Clapham
      - for the junction for Ingleton and an end-on junction via Sedbergh to Low Gill on the London and North Western Railway (LNWR) West Coast Main Line
    - Bentham
    - Lancaster Green Ayre
      - At this point, the line divided at a triangular junction for the two lines:
        - Morecambe
        - Heysham Port, including a station for Middleton Road Heysham
- Settle
- Horton-in-Ribblesdale
- Ribblehead
- Dent
- Garsdale
  - At Hawes, on the branch to the east of the main line, there was an end-on junction with the North Eastern Railway (NER) line across the Pennines to Northallerton
- Kirkby Stephen
- Appleby
- Langwathby
- Armathwaite
- Cumwhinton
- Carlisle

== Former stations ==
As with most railway lines in Britain, the route used to serve far more stations than it currently does. Places that the current main line used to serve include:

London to Leicester:
- Camden Road
- Haverstock Hill
- Finchley Road
- Welsh Harp
- Napsbury
- Chiltern Green
- Ampthill
- Oakley
- Sharnbrook
- Irchester
- Finedon
- Isham and Burton Latimer
- Glendon and Rushton
- Desborough
- East Langton
- Kibworth
- Great Glen
- Wigston Magna

Leicester to Trent Junction:

- Leicester Humberstone Road
- Cossington Gate
- Hathern
- Kegworth
- Trent

Derwent Valley:

- Breaston (later Sawley – see Long Eaton)
- Draycott
- Borrowash
- Derby Nottingham Road
- Wingfield
- Stretton
- Clay Cross

Erewash Valley:

- Long Eaton (Original Midland Counties Railway station, not the present one)
- Stapleford and Sandiacre
- Stanton Gate
- Trowell
- Ilkeston Junction and Cossall – reopened as Ilkeston
- Shipley Gate
- Codnor Park and Ironville
- Pye Bridge
- Westhouses and Blackwell
- Doe Hill

Chesterfield to Leeds:

- Staveley
- Eckington and Renishaw
- Killamarsh West
- Beighton
- Woodhouse Mill
- Treeton
- Sheepbridge
- Unstone
- Beauchief
- Millhouses
- Heeley
- Attercliffe Road
- Brightside
- Holmes
- Rotherham Masborough
- Parkgate and Rawmarsh
- Kilnhurst
- Swinton West (reopened Swinton)

The following, on the original North Midland Railway line:

- Wath North
- Darfield
- Cudworth
- Royston and Notton
- Oakenshaw (originally for Wakefield)
- Normanton
- Methley North

== Gallery ==
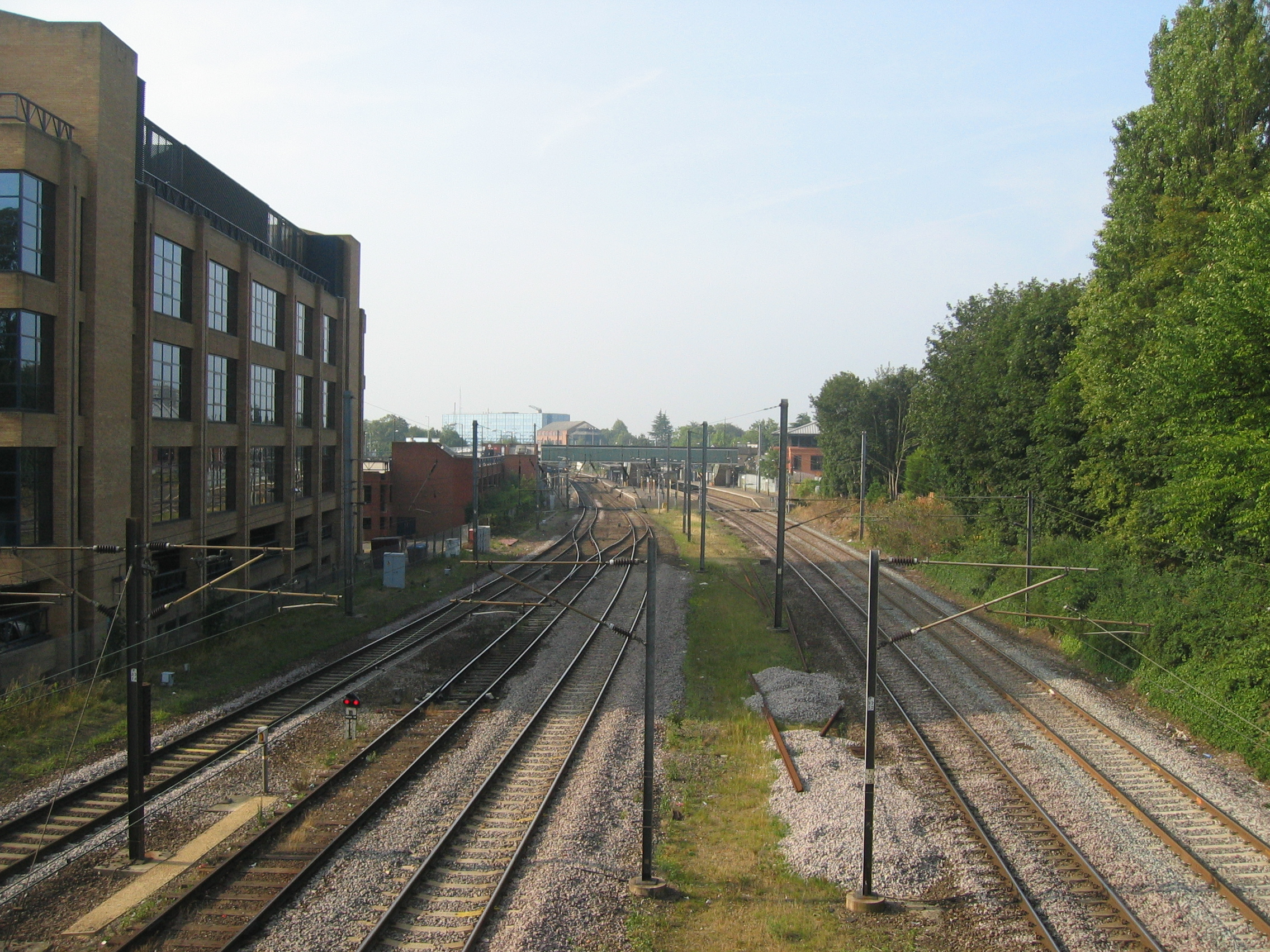
Looking south along the Midland Main Line at St Albans

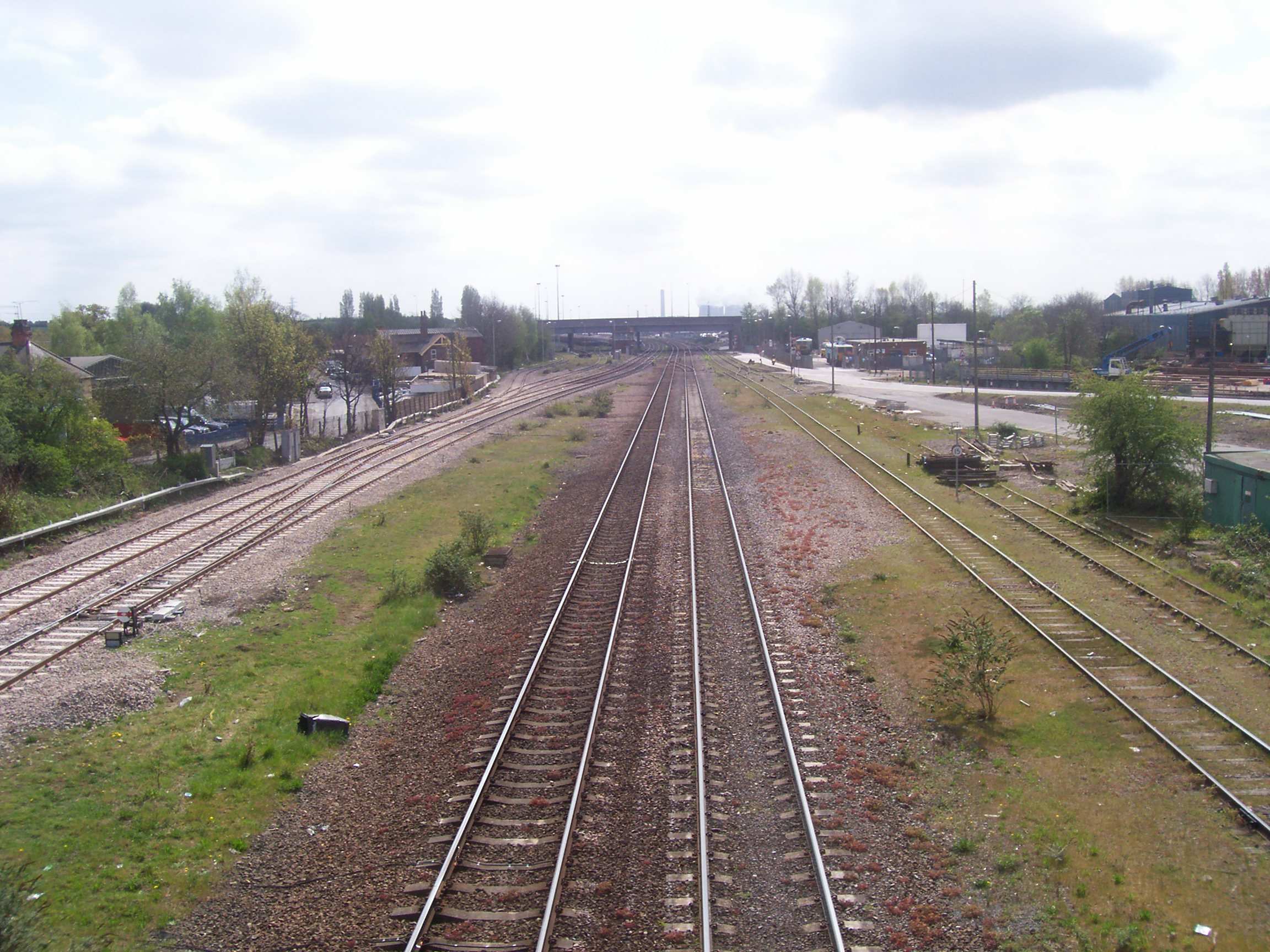
The Erewash Valley Line, part of the Midland Main Line, seen here at Stapleford

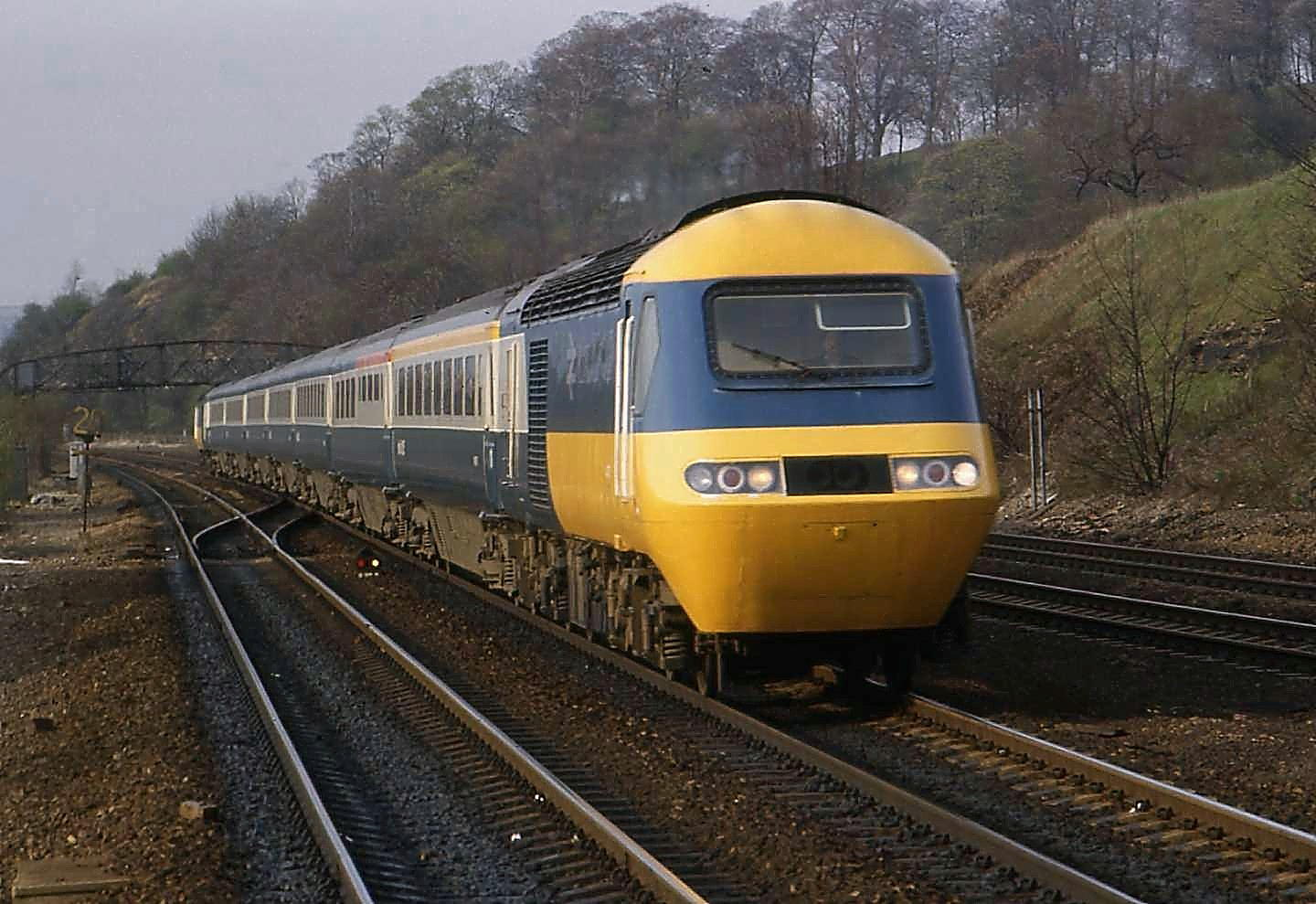
A High Speed Train near Chesterfield

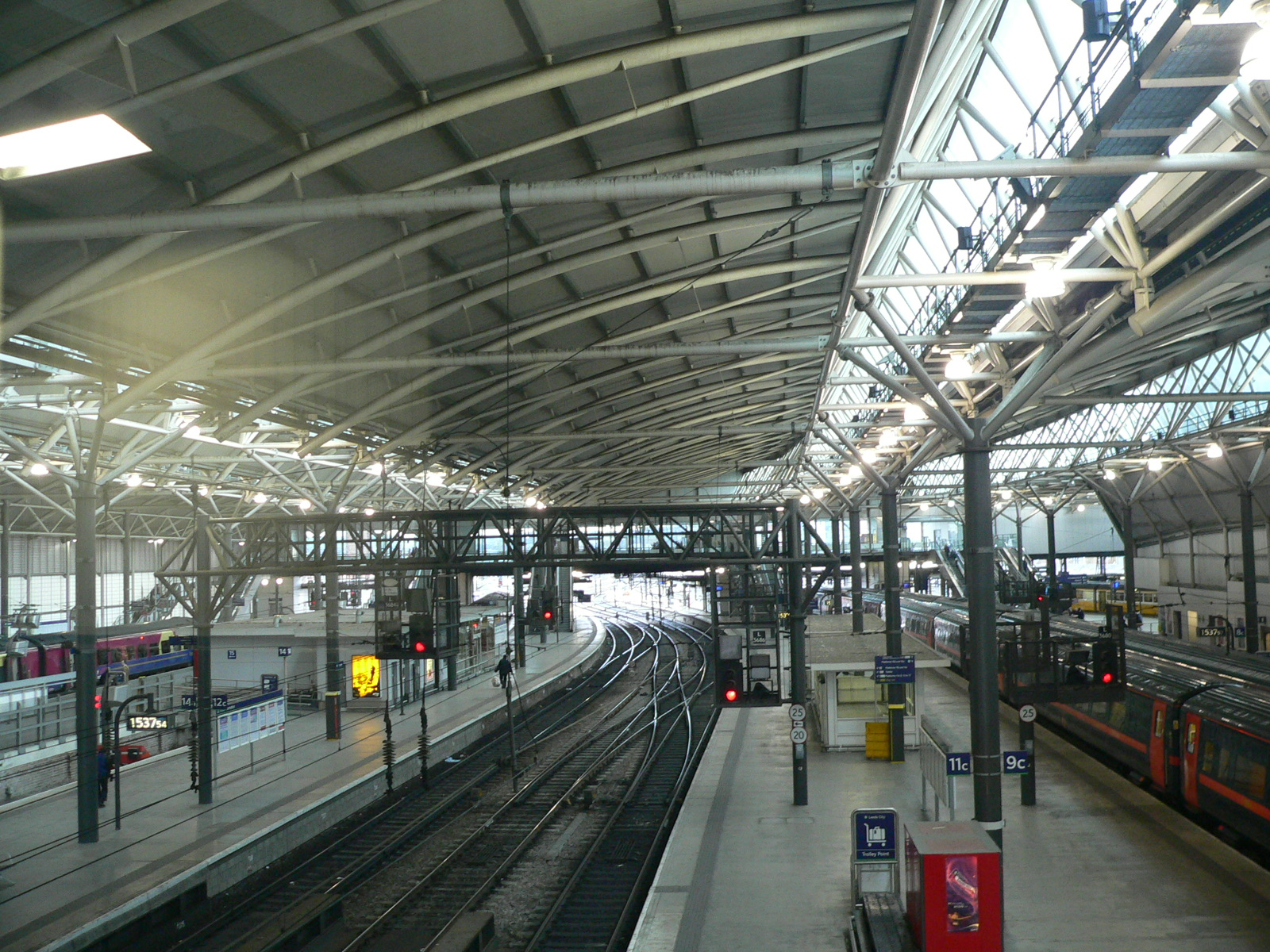
Leeds station, a former key reversal point on the Midland Main Line on the route north

== See also ==
- Midland Main Line railway upgrade
- Great Central Main Line – former competing main line
- East Coast Main Line
- West Coast Main Line
- Great Western Main Line
- Highland Main Line
