= Isham and Burton Latimer railway station =

Former railway station in Northamptonshire, England

Coordinates: 52.3632°N 0.6985°W

Burton Latimer
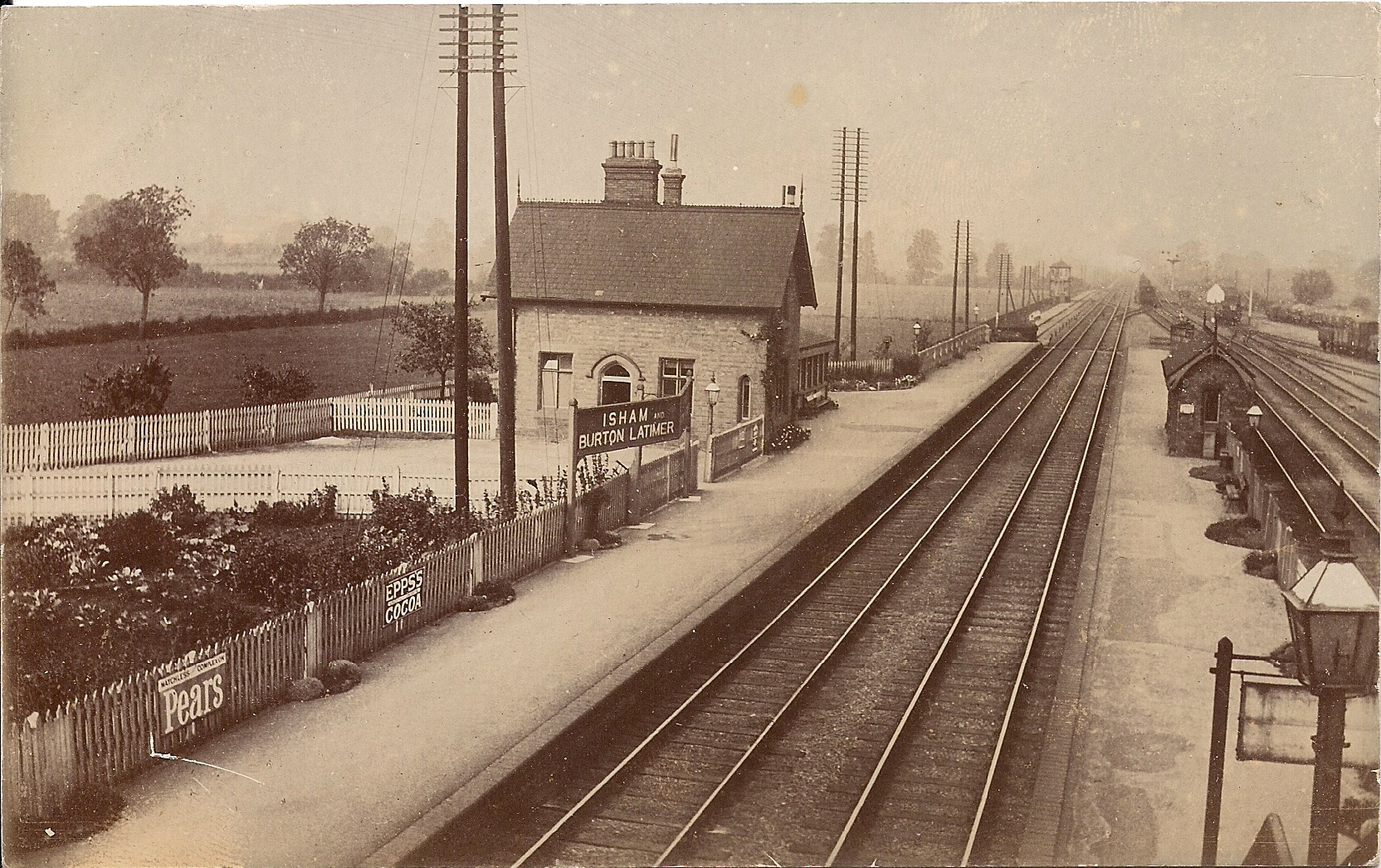

General information
- Location: Burton Latimer, North Northamptonshire; England
- Platforms: 2

Other information
- Status: Disused

History
- Pre-grouping: Midland Railway
- Post-grouping: London, Midland and Scottish Railway; British Railways

Key dates
- 8 May 1857: Opened as Isham
- Jan 1859: Renamed Isham and Burton Latimer
- 1 Oct 1923: Renamed Burton; Latimer for Isham
- 20 Nov 1950: Closed
Location

Isham and Burton Latimer railway station was built by the Midland Railway in 1857 to serve the villages of Isham and Burton Latimer on its extension from Leicester to Bedford and Hitchin. It closed in 1950 and the building has since been converted into a house.

Slightly north of it was a branch line which ran until 1959 to Thrapston and Huntingdon.

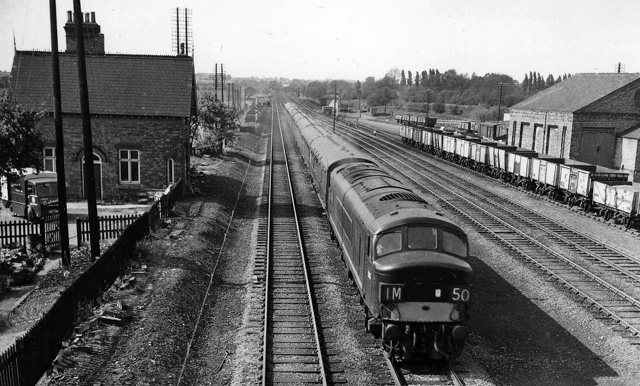
Site of Burton Latimer Station in 1962

Preceding station	Historical railways	Following station
Kettering	Midland Railway; Midland Main Line	Finedon
