= Finedon railway station =

Former railway station in Northamptonshire, England

Coordinates: 52.3475°N 0.6906°W

Finedon
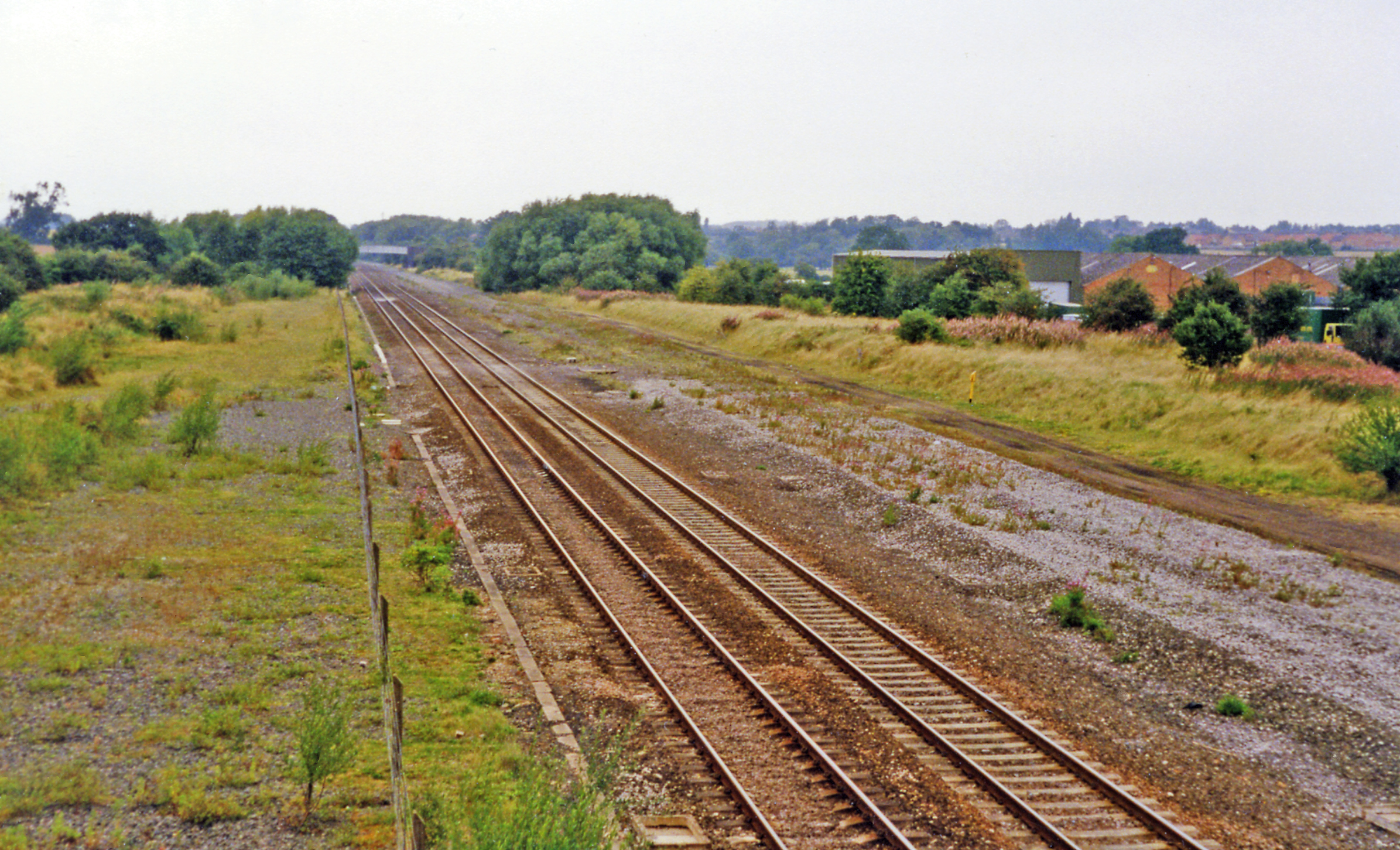
- Site of Finedon station, 1993

General information
- Location: Isham, North Northamptonshire; England
- Platforms: 2

Other information
- Status: Disused

History
- Original company: Midland Railway
- Pre-grouping: Midland Railway
- Post-grouping: London, Midland and Scottish Railway

Key dates
- 1857: Opened
- 2 December 1940: Closed (passenger)
- 1964: Closed (goods)
Location

Finedon railway station was built by the Midland Railway in 1857 on its extension from Leicester to Bedford and Hitchin.

It had one island platform. Being a mile and a half from Finedon village it was little used in later years and closed to passengers in 1940. It remained open for goods until 1964 and had quite large sidings for the local stone, with a tramway to the Excelsior and the Finedon Hill mines.

== Stationmasters ==
- Joseph Wright until 1861 (afterwards station master at Sharnbrook)
- G. Salmon from 1861
- W. Wood until 1873 (afterwards station master at Barton and Walton))
- W. Doughty 1873 - 1876 (formerly station master at Grafham, afterwards station master at Helpston)
- J. Blower 1876 - 1878 (afterwards station master at Chapel-en-le-Frith)
- Edwin Hoe 1878 - 1885 (formerly station master at Whatstandwell, afterwards station master at Sharnbrook)
- G.E. Cookson 1885 - 1891 (afterwards station master at Wilnecote)
- Henry Pitt 1891 - 1893 (afterwards station master at Rushden)
- W.S. Orchard 1893 - 1896
- A. Roper 1896 - 1910 (formerly station master at Higham Ferrers, afterwards station master at Wellingborough)
- Mr. Goatman 1910
- Mark Avery 1910 - 1921 (afterwards station master at Stanton Gate)
- Albert Edgar Brinklow ca. 1925
- Joseph Higgs ca. 1942
- H.L. Stanton from 1944
- Edward A. Steele ca. 1950

Preceding station	Historical railways	Following station
Isham and Burton Latimer	Midland Railway; Midland Main Line	Wellingborough
