= Wellingborough rail accident =

1898 railway incident in England

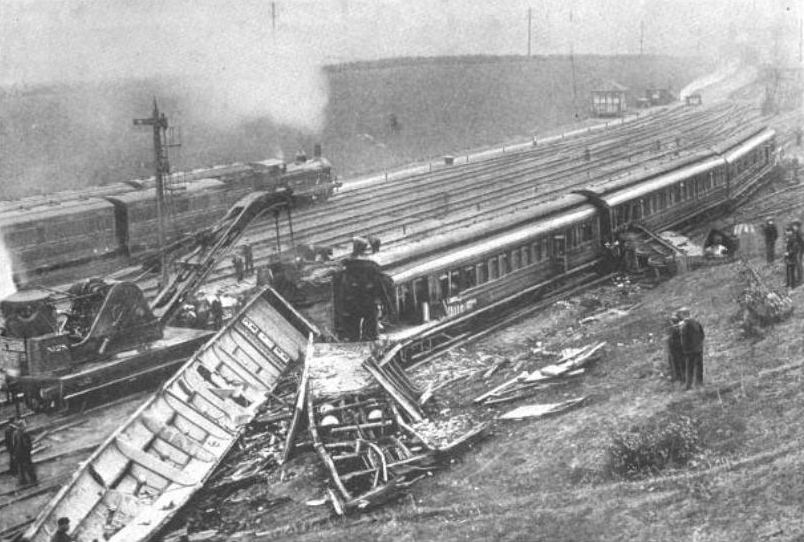

Details
- Date: 2 September 1898
- Location: Wellingborough railway station, Northamptonshire
- Coordinates: 52.303°N 0.674°W
- Country: England
- Line: Midland Main Line
- Operator: Midland Railway
- Cause: Obstruction on line

Statistics
- Trains: 1
- Deaths: 7
- Injured: 65

On 2 September 1898 at Wellingborough railway station a postman brought a mailcart to the station with mail which he was to see onto a train due at 20:22. The mail should then have been brought to the down platform through a passageway (normally closed by a gate kept locked from the inside) between the station yard and the platform. The postman went into the station, collected a luggage trolley, and took it along the platform to the platform side of the gate. Whilst the platform itself sloped towards the railway tracks quite noticeably, the passageway did not. The postman put down the handle by which he was drawing the trolley and unlocked the gate. He then reached round for the trolley handle only to see the trolley running off the edge of the platform and onto the down main line.

He and the station foreman tried frantically to clear the trolley off the line as the signals were already set for the 19:15 London St Pancras to Manchester express to pass through the station non-stop. A train at the up platform prevented them simply moving the trolley onto the up-line, and it was not possible to lift the c 4 1/2 hundredweight (230kg) trolley 2 ft to get it back onto the platform. They attempted to get the trolley on its side in the "six-foot way" between the two lines, but did not succeed and had to jump for their lives as the express neared.

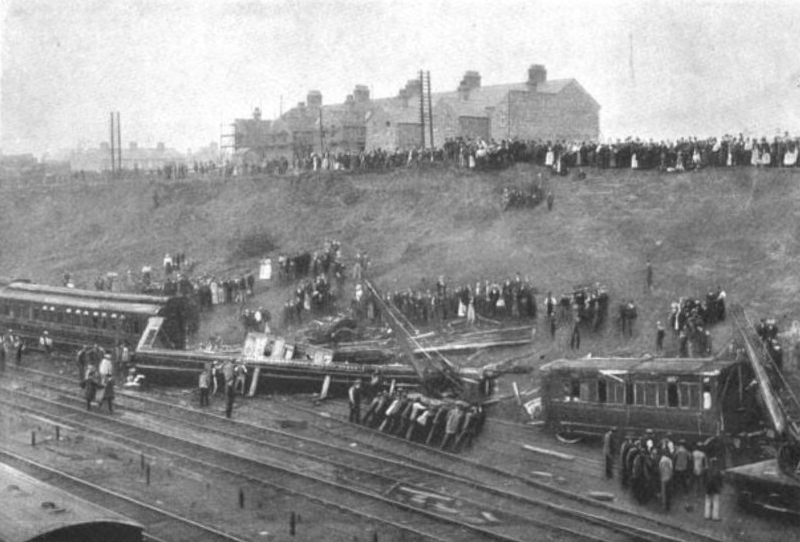

The leading bogie of the locomotive derailed on hitting the trolley, but the driving wheels did not; the engine continued onwards until it hit a diamond crossover at the north end of the station when it became completely derailed, detached from its tender and ended up facing backwards. The second passenger coach was completely wrecked. Both enginemen and five passengers were killed.

The subsequent Board of Trade accident investigation showed that the down platform sloped unnecessarily steeply (1 in 24) towards the track, and that whilst the passageway was not so fiercely graded it still sloped at about 1 in 80 to the track. Practical experiment showed that this was quite sufficient to allow a luggage trolley to roll away unless the greatest care was taken. The Board of Trade Inspector recommended

- That station platforms should either be level or slope away from the railway lines
- That 3-wheeled and 4-wheeled trolleys used on railway station platforms (especially those sloping towards the railway) should have brakes which were normally applied, but which would be released by pushing or pulling the trolley

== Sources ==
- Rolt, L.T.C.; Kichenside, Geoffrey (1982) [1955]. Red for Danger (4th ed.). Newton Abbot: David & Charles. p. 94. ISBN 0-7153-8362-0.
