= Rushden, Higham and Wellingborough Railway =

Heritage railway in Northamptonshire, England

Coordinates: 52°17′41″N 0°35′52″W

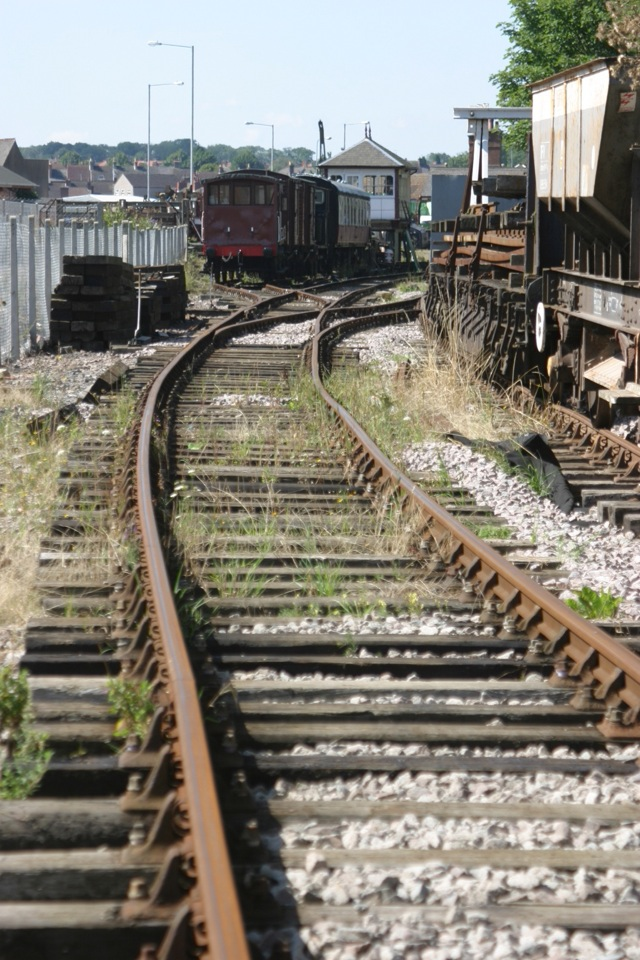
- Running line at Rushden, Higham & Wellingborough Railway

Commercial operations
- Name: British Rail
- Original gauge: 4 ft 8 1/2 in (1,435 mm) standard gauge

Preserved operations
- Operated by: Rushden Historical Transport Society
- Stations: 1
- Length: 1/2 mile (0.8 km)
- Preserved gauge: 4 ft 8 1/2 in (1,435 mm) standard gauge

Commercial history
- Closed: 1971

Preservation history
- Headquarters: Rushden station

The Rushden, Higham and Wellingborough Railway is a branch line heritage railway operated by the Rushden Historical Transport Society in the town of Rushden in the county of Northamptonshire, England.

The aim of the society was to reopen most of the former Midland Railway branch line from Wellingborough to Higham Ferrers, which had been closed completely in November 1969. As of May 2025, approximately 1/2 mile (0.8 km) stretch of the line is operated between Rushden station and Prospect Avenue. The society plans to extend the line to a halt at Higham Ferrers. They are unable to extend back towards Wellingborough due to developments that have taken place along the route of the old branch line.

== Rushden station ==
Rushden station has been preserved by the Rushden Historical Transport Society. The station building is fully intact and open with no admission fee although donations are requested.

The footbridge is currently missing, and a level crossing divides the platform into two sections. A replacement footbridge similar to the original is awaiting installation, at which point the missing section of platform will be replaced.

On operating days trains use a separate platform slightly to the east. There is a signal box on site also. To the west immediately after the station there is a bridge missing. To the east, the line ends adjacent to Prospect Ave, and is used throughout the year.

Since the late 1990s, Rushden Station bar has been home to a series of resident cats. The most recent station cats, Alfie and Thomas, have achieved minor fame on social media.

=== Rolling stock ===
On site can be found a main-line diesel, Class 31, 31206, a number of Mark 1 carriages and a Gresley buffet car. In addition the line has a few industrial steam locomotives and some small diesel shunters. Frequently a number of preserved buses and coaches can also be found on the site.

- Steam Locomotives
  - Andrew Barclay 0-4-0ST No 2168 "Edmundsons". Built in 1940. Undergoing overhaul.
  - Bagnall 0-6-0ST No 2654 Cherwell. Awaiting funds for major restoration.
- Diesel locomotives
  - BR A1A-A1A Class 31 no. 31206. Operational. BR Railfreight Built in 1960.
  - BR 0-6-0DM Class 03 no. 03179 Clive. First Capital Connect purple.
  - 4wDH Diesel-Hydraulic Sentinel shunter no. 10159. Operational.
- Diesel multiple units
  - BR Class 121 no. 55029 (977968) Network Rail Yellow Built in 1960.
  - BR Class 142 nos. 142084 and 142091.
- Coaching stock
  - BR Post Office Sorting Van NSA 80334 built in 1969.
  - BR Post Office Stowage Van NTA 80413 built in 1957.
  - BR High-security General Utility Van NKA 94102 built in 1959.
  - BR Brake Gangwayed NEX 92363. Used for passenger services. built in 1957.
  - BR Mark 1 Tourist Second Open no. 3918 built in 1954.
  - BR Mark 1 BSK no. 34004 built in 1951.
  - BR Mark 2 Tourist Second Open no. 5166. Used for passenger services. built in 1966.
  - LNER Gresley Buffet Carriage no. 24279 built in 1937.

== See also ==
- Rushden Parkway railway station
