= Old Dalby railway station =

Former railway station in Leicestershire, England

Old Dalby
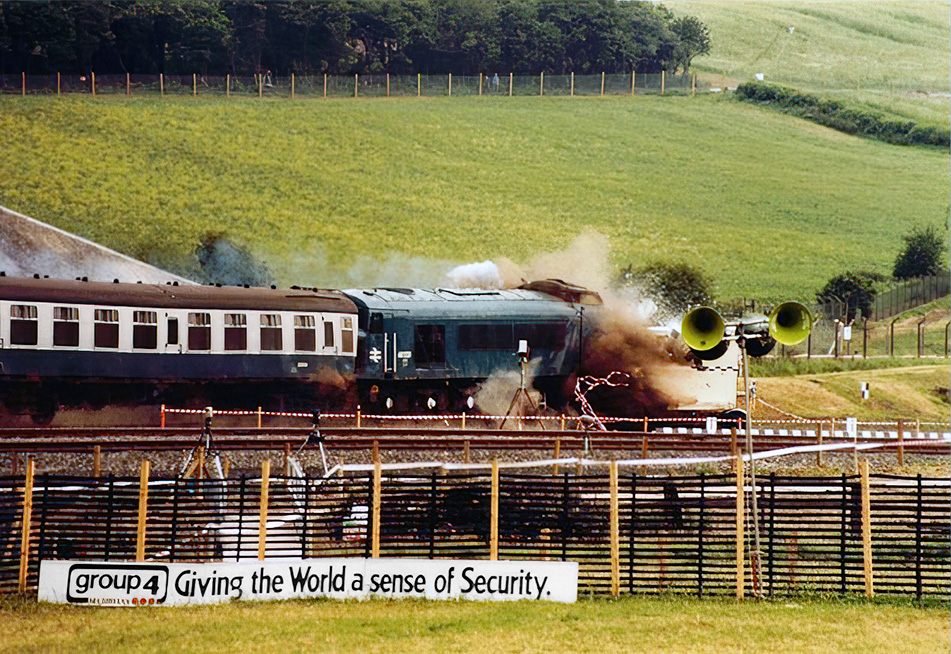
- Test site of nuclear flask test south of Old Dalby station.

General information
- Location: Old Dalby, Melton; England
- Coordinates: 52.8095°N 0.9937°W
- Platforms: 2

Other information
- Status: Disused

History
- Original company: Midland Railway
- Pre-grouping: Midland Railway
- Post-grouping: London, Midland and Scottish Railway; London Midland Region of British Railways

Key dates
- 2 February 1880: Station opens
- 1 June 1964: Closes to goods
- 18 April 1966: Closes to passengers
Location

Old Dalby railway station served the village of Old Dalby in Leicestershire, England. It was opened on the Nottingham direct line of the Midland Railway between London and Nottingham, avoiding Leicester. The line still exists today as the Old Dalby Test Track.

== History ==
The station was opened for goods on 1 November 1879 and to passengers on 2 February 1880 by the Midland Railway. The station was designed by the Midland Railway company architect John Holloway Sanders.

It was on its cut-off line from Melton Mowbray to Nottingham, which had opened the previous year to allow the railway company's expresses between London and the North to avoid reversal at Nottingham. It also improved access to and from the iron-ore fields in Leicestershire and Rutland. Local traffic was minimal but the presence of two army bases built during the last war and the exchange sidings traffic prolonged the life of the station but it eventually succumbed and closed to passengers in 1966.

According to the Official Handbook of Stations the following classes of traffic were handled by this station in 1956: G, P, F, L, H, C and there was a 1-ton 10 cwt crane.

=== Stationmasters ===
- John J. Shrieves 1879 - 1887
- William Drake 1887 - 1903 (afterwards station master at Harlington, Bedfordshire until 1909 when he was killed by a goods train)
- Sidney William Varnam 1903 - 1906 (formerly station master at Burton Joyce)
- Alfred Ballard 1906 - 1921 (afterwards station master at Shefford)
- William Albert Thorneycroft 1921 - 1928
- Percy Harry Hyde 1930 - 1939 (afterwards station master at Tewkesbury)
- Reginald W. Whitehead B.E.M. 1940 - 1947 (afterwards station master at Moira)
- Arthur W. Flewitt 1959 - 1963 (formerly station master at Chatburn)
- Jack Glover 1963 - 1969

Preceding station	Disused railways	Following station
Upper Broughton	Midland Railway; Nottingham direct line of the Midland Railway	Grimston

== Present day ==
Following the closure of the line as a through-route in 1968, the track between Melton Mowbray and Edwalton was converted for use as the Old Dalby Test Track, used initially for the Advanced Passenger Train project and, more recently, for Class 390 Pendolino units. The station building was timber and did not survive but the timber goods shed still exists. Old Dalby was the site of the original control centre for the line in BR days equipped with utility buildings and a small workshop. Later the operations centre was moved to Asfordby when Alstom took over. Today there are still sidings at Old Dalby and an enlarged workshop and new track layout to accommodate the London Underground trains on test. The transformer and 750DC power supply for the 3rd/4th rail system is also located here. The station master's house survives by the roadside as a private residence and the weighbridge as a domestic garage.
