= Grimston railway station =

Former railway station in Leicestershire, England

Grimston
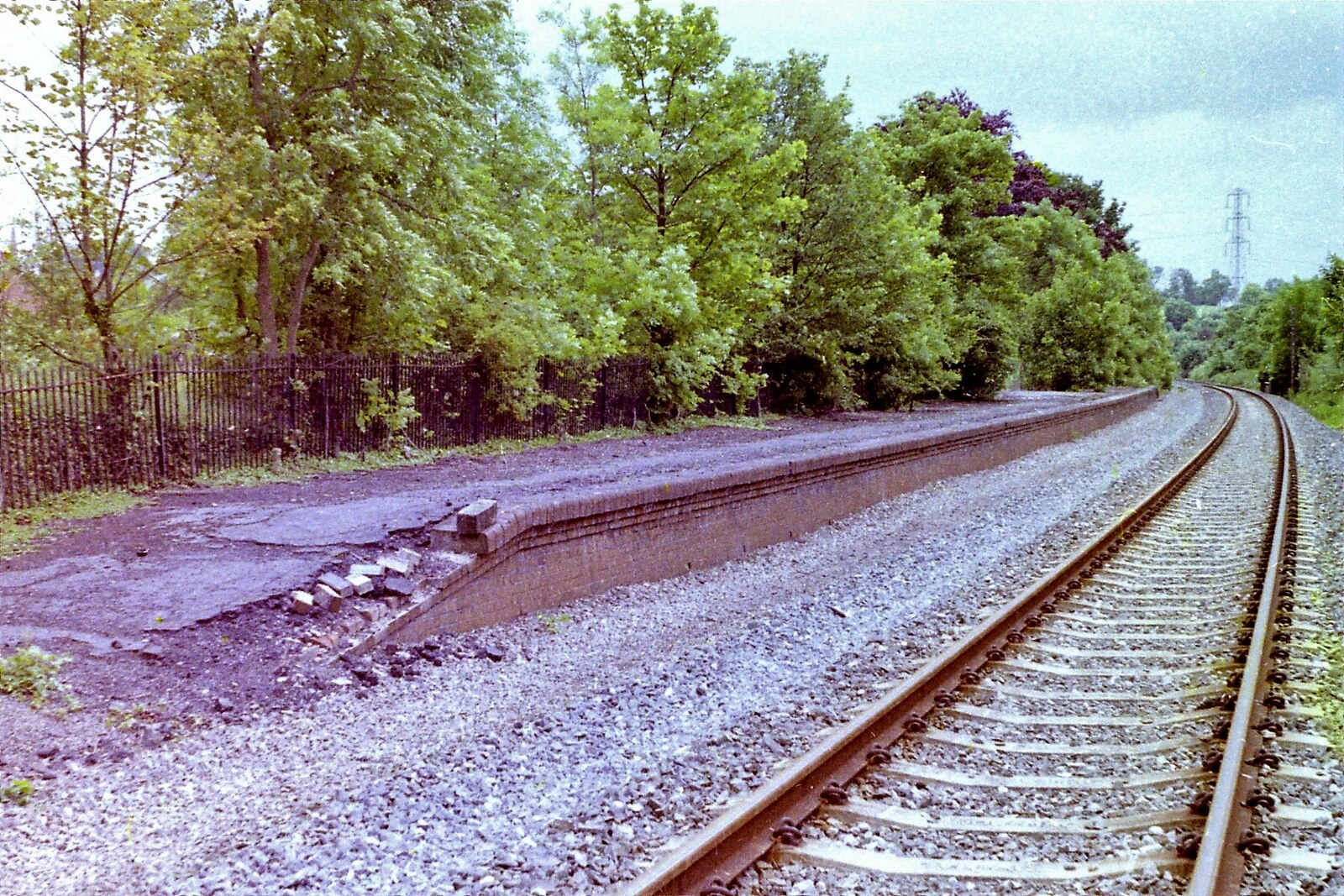
- The site of the station in 1981

General information
- Location: Grimston, Melton; England
- Coordinates: 52.782159°N 0.965675°W
- Platforms: 2

Other information
- Status: Disused

History
- Original company: Midland Railway
- Pre-grouping: Midland Railway
- Post-grouping: London, Midland and Scottish Railway; London Midland Region of British Railways

Key dates
- 2 February 1880: Station opens
- 4 February 1957: Closes to passengers and goods
Location

Grimston was a railway station serving both the villages of Saxelbye and Grimston in Leicestershire, England. It was opened on the Nottingham direct line of the Midland Railway between London and Nottingham via Corby.The station was formerly named Saxelbye, the name was changed after only 3 months to avoid confusion with Saxby, a few miles east of Melton Mowbray, on the Midland's other line between Leicester and Peterborough. The village of Grimston lies about one mile to the north west of the former Grimston station. The line still exists today as the Old Dalby Test Track.

== History ==
The station was opened for goods (1 November 1879) & passengers (2 February 1880) by the Midland Railway. The station was designed by the Midland Railway company architect John Holloway Sanders.

It was on its cut-off line from Melton Mowbray to Nottingham. The line was built to allow the railway company's expresses between London and the North to avoid reversal at Nottingham. It also improved access to and from the iron-ore fields in Leicestershire and Rutland. Local traffic was minimal and Grimston closed to passengers in 1957.

According to the Official Handbook of Stations the following classes of traffic were handled by this station in 1956: G, P, F, L, H, C and there was a 1-ton 10 cwt crane.

=== Stationmasters ===
From 1930 the role of stationmaster was merged with that at Old Dalby.

- George Hull 1879 - 1881
- Charles Radcliffe Cooper 1881 - 1888 (formerly station master at Croxall)
- Thomas England 1888 - 1899
- Alfred Ballard 1899 - 1906 (afterwards station master at Old Dalby)
- Herbert Henry Gilbert 1906 - 1922
- William Henry Lambert 1922 - 1924 (Died when hit by a train)
- Percy Harry Hyde 1925 - 1939 (also station master at Old Dalby from 1930, afterwards station master at Tewkesbury)

Preceding station	Disused railways	Following station
Old Dalby	Midland Railway; Nottingham direct line of the Midland Railway	Melton Mowbray

== Present day ==
Following the closure of the line as a through-route in 1968, the track between Melton Mowbray and Edwalton was converted for use as the Old Dalby Test Track, used initially for the Advanced Passenger Train project and, more recently, Class 390 Pendolino units. The original station building was timber and did not survive, nor did the brick-built goods shed but the Up platform is still in existence and the former station master's house is now a private residence.
