= Widmerpool railway station =

Former railway station in Nottinghamshire, England

Coordinates: 52.8564°N 1.0395°W

Widmerpool
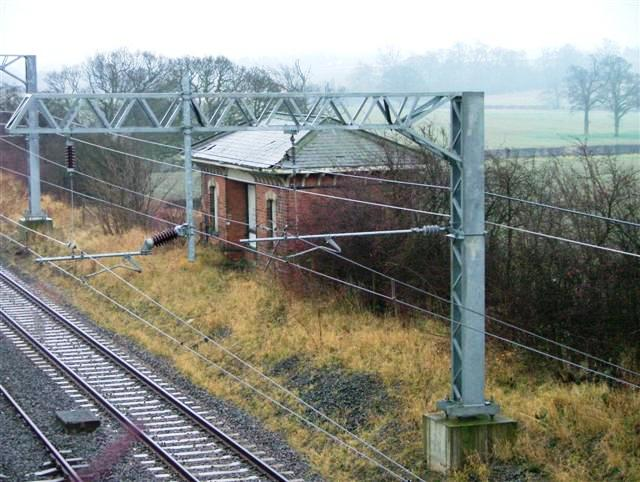
- Surviving down platform waiting room in 2006.

General information
- Location: Widmerpool, Rushcliffe; England
- Platforms: 2

Other information
- Status: Disused

History
- Original company: Midland Railway
- Post-grouping: London, Midland and Scottish Railway; London Midland Region of British Railways

Key dates
- 2 February 1880: Station opens
- 28 February 1949: Closed to passengers
- 1 March 1965: Closed to goods
Location

Widmerpool was a railway station serving the village of Widmerpool in Nottinghamshire,England. It was situated on the Nottingham direct line of the Midland Railway between London and Nottingham via Melton Mowbray.

== History ==
The station was opened for goods (1 Nov 1879) & passengers (2 February 1880) by the Midland Railway. The station was designed by the Midland Railway company architect John Holloway Sanders.

It was on its cut-off line from Melton Mowbray to Nottingham, which had opened the previous year to allow the railway company's expresses between London and the North to avoid reversal at Nottingham. It also improved access to and from the iron-ore fields in Leicestershire and Rutland.

Local traffic was always minimal, a situation not helped by the station being situated one and a half miles from the village of its name, and it closed to passengers as early as 1949.

According to the Official Handbook of Stations the following classes of traffic were being handled at this station in 1956: G, P†, F, L, H, C and there was a 1-ton 10 cwt crane.

=== Stationmasters ===
- Thomas Sanders 1879 - 1883
- G. Lamberts 1884 - 1888 (afterwards station master at Whitacre)
- James Brindley 1888
- William Henry Higginson 1888 - 1890 (afterwards station master at Fiskerton)
- William H. Turner 1890 - 1893 (afterwards station master at Carlton)
- Samuel Oughton 1893 - 1895 (formerly station master at Edwalton, afterwards station master at Whitwell)
- John Thomas Tye 1895 - 1903
- George Edward Cramp 1903 - 1916 (formerly station master at Hykeham, afterwards district station master in Nigeria)
- Harry Horbutt Russell 1918 - 1921
- Thomas Alfred Mason 1922 - 1937
- Harold Crompton 1937 - 1939 (also station master at Upper Broughton, afterwards station master at Ipstones, Bradnop and Winkhill)
- William Simmonds from 1939
- Arnold Naylor
- Frank W.E. Clarke 1945 - 1947 (afterwards station master at Rolleston Junction)
- E.J. Bloor 1947 (formerly station master at Westhouses)
- John Abel 1947
- George Jones 1948 - 1956
- Fred Saunders 1958 - 1960

Preceding station	Disused railways	Following station
Plumtree	Midland Railway; Nottingham direct line of the Midland Railway	Upper Broughton

== Present day ==
Following the closure of the line as a through-route in 1968, the track between Melton Mowbray and Edwalton was converted for use as the Old Dalby Test Track. This was used initially for the Advanced Passenger Train project and, more recently, Class 390 Pendolino units. It was also used for testing London Underground 'S Stock' trains.

The station's Up platform remains in existence, as does the Down platform waiting room although the platform itself was removed during electrification work in 2000. The main station building was converted into a pub and restaurant c1966 before the line closed. It was originally called the Schooner Inn and later the Pullman Inn. Following closure of the business, Network Rail purchased the building and surrounding land in order to secure access to the test track infrastructure. The building was unused from 2016 to 2022.

The buildings were demolished in August 2022.

The timber goods shed survived until electrification in 2000. Just to the north of the station site lies Stanton Tunnel,1,330 yards (1,220 m) long.

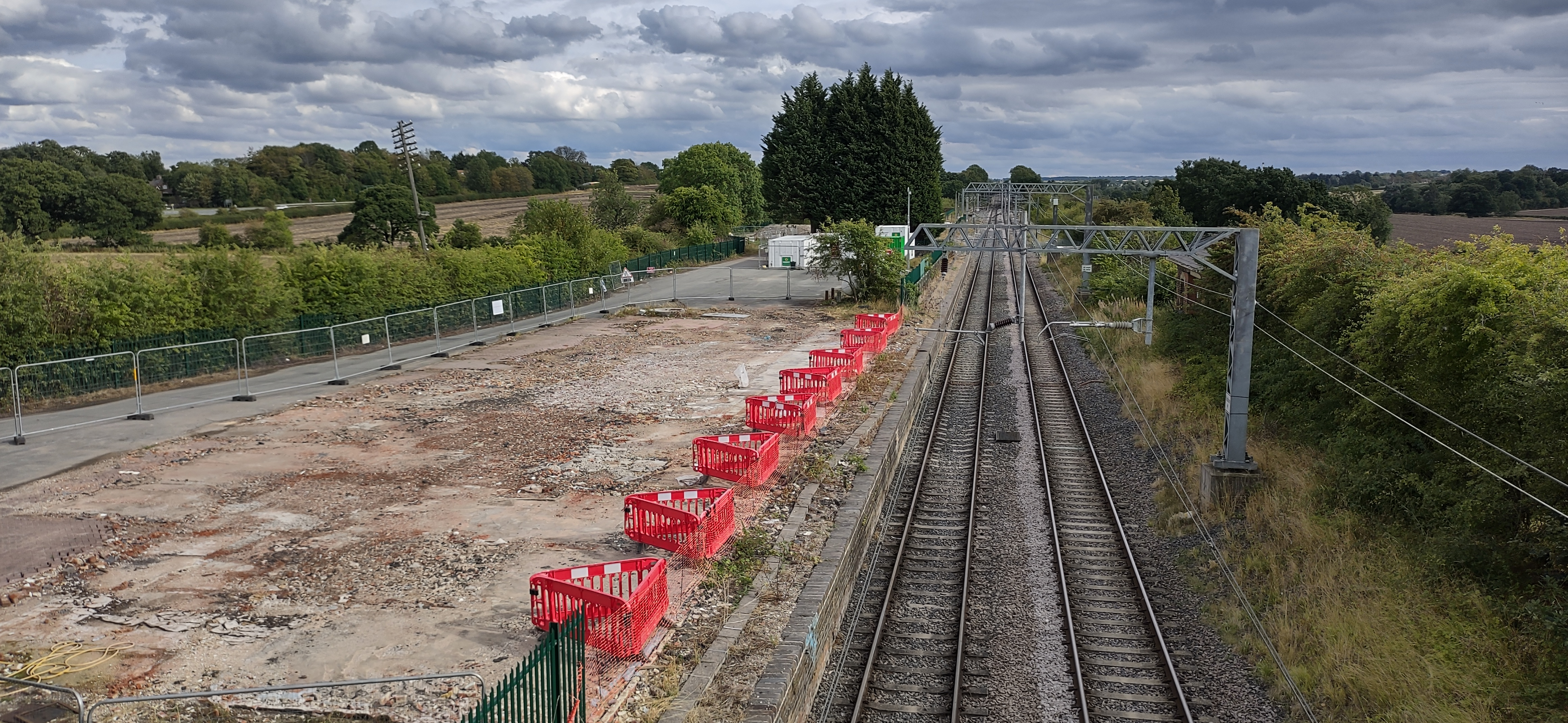
