= Upper Broughton =

English rural village

Coordinates: 52.828634°N 0.98845303°W

- Village and civil parish
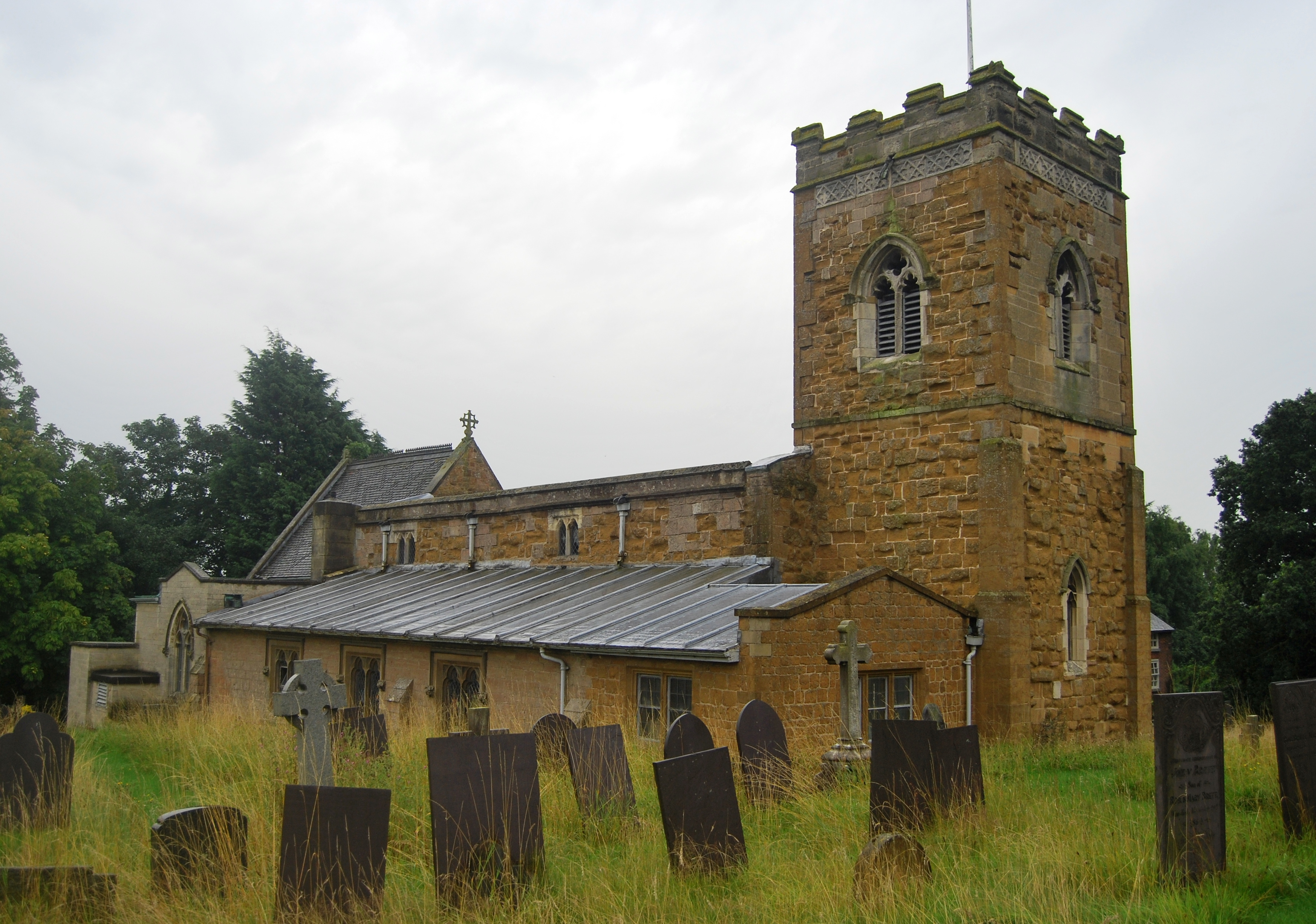
- St Luke's Church

- Location within Nottinghamshire
- Interactive map of Upper Broughton
- Area: 3.06 sq mi (7.9 km^{2})
- Population: 346 (2021 census)
  - Density: 113/sq mi (44/km^{2})
- OS grid reference: SK 682261
  - London: 100 mi (160 km) SSE
- District: Rushcliffe
- Shire county: Nottinghamshire
- Region: East Midlands
- Country: England
- Sovereign state: United Kingdom
- Post town: Melton Mowbray
- Postcode district: LE14
- Dialling code: 01664
- Police: Nottinghamshire
- Fire: Nottinghamshire
- Ambulance: East Midlands
- UK Parliament: Rushcliffe
- Website: http://upperbroughton.objectis.net

Upper Broughton or Broughton-Sulney or Over-Broughton is a village and civil parish about seven miles north west of Melton Mowbray, in the Rushcliffe district of the county of Nottinghamshire, England. In 2011 the built-up area had a population of 327, the same as the parish. The parish count increased to 346 at the 2021 census. The parish touches Wymeswold, Hickling, Widmerpool, Broughton and Old Dalby and Willoughby on the Wolds. Upper Broughton is a conservation area that was designated in 1973 and is 16 hectares. The settlement is near the boundary with Leicestershire, and Nether Broughton is across the county boundary.

== Features ==
There are 16 listed buildings in Upper Broughton, of which St Luke's Church is Grade I listed.

Upper Broughton has a village hall, on Melton Road (A606) near the junction with Bottom Green.

There is a pub on Main Street, which was originally called the Golden Fleece and is now the Tap and Run. It was badly damaged by fire in June 2022 and re-opened in June 2023 after extensive rebuilding work.

Upper Broughton railway station, on the Nottingham direct line of the Midland Railway, opened in 1880 and closed in 1948.

== History ==
The name "Broughton" means 'Farm by the brook'. Upper Broughton was recorded in the Domesday Book as Brotone. On the 1st of April 1965 an area of Broughton and Old Dalby parish was transferred to the parish. The transferred area was 21 acres. The parish was part of the Bingham Wapentake. "Broughton Sulney" is another name for the parish.

In 2024, a chest of documents dating back to the 17th century and relating to people and property in Upper Broughton was discovered in a farm outhouse. The documents were listed by members of the Upper Broughton History Group and then transferred to Manuscripts and Special Collections at the University of Nottingham.
