= Upper Broughton railway station =

Former railway station in Nottinghamshire, England

Coordinates: 52.8256°N 1.0037°W

Upper Broughton
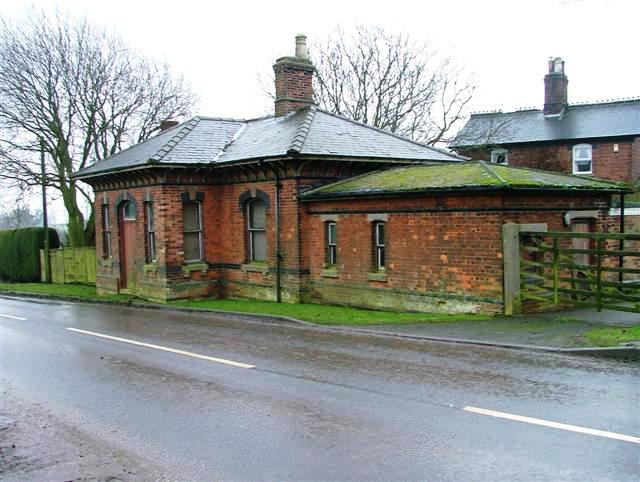
- Upper Broughton station buildings in 2006

General information
- Location: Upper Broughton, Rushcliffe; England
- Platforms: 2

Other information
- Status: Disused

History
- Original company: Midland Railway
- Post-grouping: London, Midland and Scottish Railway; London Midland Region of British Railways

Key dates
- 2 February 1880: Station opens
- 31 May 1948: Station closes
Location

Upper Broughton was a railway station serving the village of Upper Broughton in Nottinghamshire, England. It was opened on the Nottingham direct line of the Midland Railway between London and Nottingham, avoiding Leicester. The line still exists today as the Old Dalby Test Track.

== History ==
The station was opened for passengers on 2 February 1880 by the Midland Railway. The station was designed by the Midland Railway company architect John Holloway Sanders.

It was on its cut-off line from Melton Mowbray to Nottingham, which had opened the previous year to allow the railway company's expresses between London and the North to avoid reversal at Nottingham. It also improved access to and from the iron-ore fields in Leicestershire and Rutland. Local traffic was minimal and Upper Broughton closed to passengers as early as 1948.

=== Stationmasters ===
- George Linney
- Joseph Cowland 1880 - 1893
- Andrew John Payne 1893 - 1920
- Joseph Hunt 1921 - 1929
- Oliver Sabin 1930 - 1936
- H. Crompton 1937 - 1939 (also station master at Widmerpool, afterwards station master at Ipstones, Bradnop and Winkhill)
- W. Simmonds from 1939 (also station master at Widmerpool)

Preceding station	Disused railways	Following station
Widmerpool	Midland Railway; Nottingham direct line of the Midland Railway	Old Dalby

== Present day ==
Following the closure of the line as a through-route in 1968, the track between Melton Mowbray and Edwalton was converted for use as the Old Dalby Test Track, used initially for the Advanced Passenger Train project, then much later the Class 390 Pendolino units.

The line was also used for the testing of London Underground 'S stock' trains built by Bombardier transportation.

The main station building on the roadside above the line remains in good condition, incorporated into the garden of the former station master's house, now a private residence.

The site was listed for sale in June 2017, at a price of £745,000. According to the listing, the roadside station building is still remarkably original.
