= Plumtree railway station =

Former railway station in Nottinghamshire, England

Plumtree
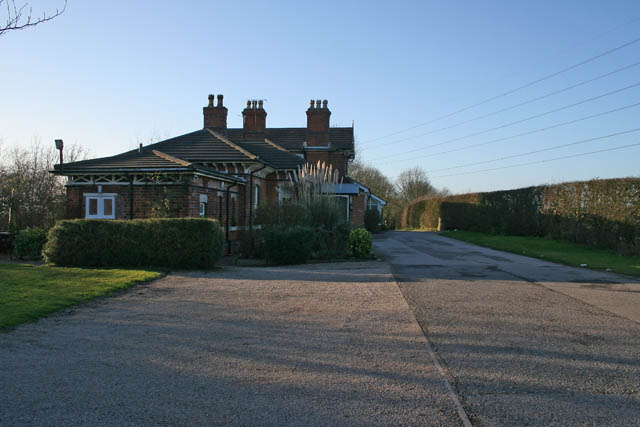
- Main station building in 2008.

General information
- Location: Plumtree, Rushcliffe; England
- Coordinates: 52.885260°N 1.083498°W
- Platforms: 2

Other information
- Status: Disused

History
- Original company: Midland Railway
- Post-grouping: London, Midland and Scottish Railway; London Midland Region of British Railways

Key dates
- 2 February 1880: Station opens as Plumtree & Keyworth
- 1 May 1893: Renamed
- 28 February 1949: Closes to passengers
- 1 November 1965: Closes to goods
Location

Plumtree railway station served the village of Plumtree in Nottinghamshire, England on the Nottingham direct line of the Midland Railway between London and Nottingham, avoiding Leicester. The station is now a pub and grill and the line is now used as the Old Dalby Test Track. Although it is closed towards Nottingham.

== History ==
The station was opened for goods (1 November 1879) & passengers (2 February 1880) by the Midland Railway. The station was designed by the Midland Railway company architect John Holloway Sanders.

It was on its cut-off line from Melton Mowbray to Nottingham, which had opened the previous year to allow the railway company's expresses between London and the North to avoid reversal at Nottingham. It also improved access to and from the iron-ore fields in Leicestershire and Rutland. Local traffic was minimal and Plumtree closed to passengers as early as 1949.

According to the Official Handbook of Stations the following classes of traffic were handled by this station in 1956: G, P†, F, L, H, C and there was a 1-ton 10 cwt crane.

In 1910, nine trains each way stopped at Plumtree Station. The earliest train to Nottingham was 7.02, and to Melton Mowbray 6.55. A passenger catching this latter service could expect to be in London St Pancras by 10.55 a.m. Sunday services were virtually non-existent, with only the morning milk train (7.49) to Nottingham.

=== Stationmasters ===
- George Thomas Bursnell 1879 - 1883
- James C. Chidgey 1883 - 1886 (afterwards station master at Spondon)
- William George Nutall 1886 - 1888 (afterwards station master at Kirkby Stephen)
- John Walters 1888 - 1890 (formerly station master at Hykeham)
- Edwin Charles Harvey 1890 - 1919
- Walter Frank Gardner 1921 - 1932
- Albert Henry Hemmings 1937 - 1939 (formerly station master at Dudbridge)
- Herbert F. Wilson 1943 - 1951 (formerly station master at East Langton)
- Arthur Nicholson 1952 - 1954
- John Ingamells 1954 - 1959
- Fred Saunders 1960 - 1965

Preceding station	Disused railways	Following station
Edwalton	Midland Railway; Nottingham direct line of the Midland Railway	Widmerpool

== Present day ==
Following the closure of the line as a through-route in 1968, the track between Melton Mowbray and Nottingham was reused as far as Edwalton and became the Old Dalby Test Track. This was used initially for the Advanced Passenger Train project and, more recently, Class 390 Pendolino units. It was also used for testing London Underground trains 'S Stock' units.

The main station buildings have survived and have been converted into 'Perkins Restaurant'. A conservatory extension has been built on the platform and the former goods shed has been restored as a function room.
