= Nottingham direct line of the Midland Railway =

Railway line in England, opened in 1879

The Nottingham direct line of the Midland Railway was a new route created in 1879 to relieve congestion on the established routes of the Midland Railway, in England. It consisted of two connecting lines that, together with part of an existing route, formed a new route from Nottingham to near Kettering. The line was used for Nottingham to London express passenger trains, and for heavy mineral and goods trains heading south. As well as shortening the transit a little, the new line had the effect of relieving congestion on the original main line through Leicester, that had become excessively congested.

The new sections of route were from Nottingham to Melton Mowbray, and from Manton to Rushton, a short distance north of Kettering. The Trowell to Radford railway line and parts of the main line south of Kettering were widened to quadruple track as part of the same project.

The Nottingham to Melton and Manton to Rushton route sections were closed in 1967, but the intermediate section between Melton Mowbray and Manton, part of the Syston and Peterborough Railway remained in use. A section of the line north of Melton was used for some years as the Old Dalby Test Track. The town of Corby had developed greatly, and a train service between Corby and Kettering was run from 1987 to 1990. The entire Kettering to Manton section was re-opened in 2009, and has been electrified from Kettering to Corby.

== The old main line ==
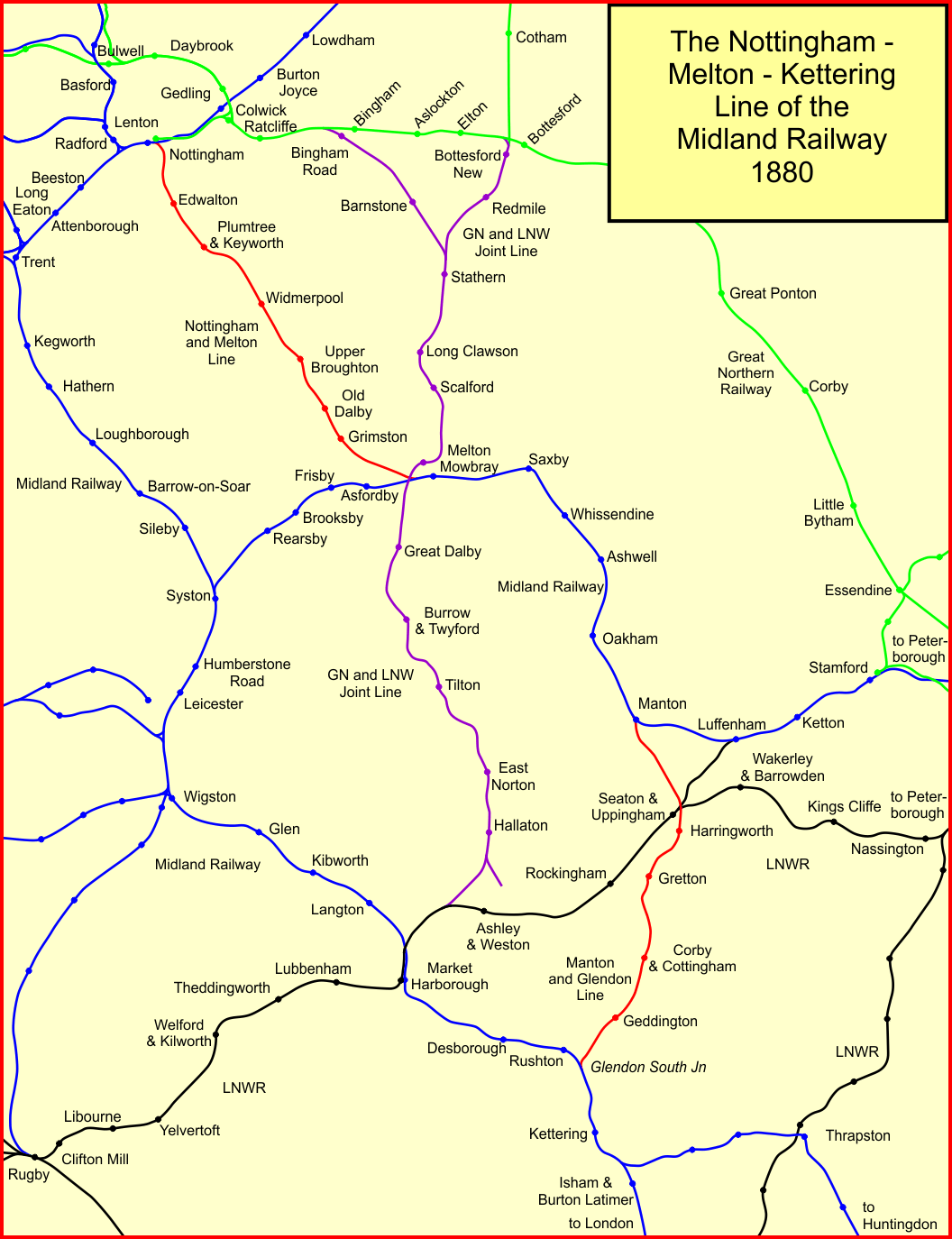
The Nottingham direct line of the Midland Railway in 1880

The Midland Railway was formed from the amalgamation of other railways, by the Midland Railway Consolidation Act 1844 (7 & 8 Vict. c. xviii). The new company had lines in a large tract of land, connecting Leeds, Derby and Nottingham to Leicester, Peterborough and Birmingham, and was soon expanded to include Bristol, Manchester, Lincoln, and, from 1857, London. From 1868 it had its own London terminus, St Pancras. In common with many early railways, the Midland Railway had a geographical area in which it was dominant, and it went to considerable lengths to exclude rival railway companies, while simultaneously trying to penetrate their territory.

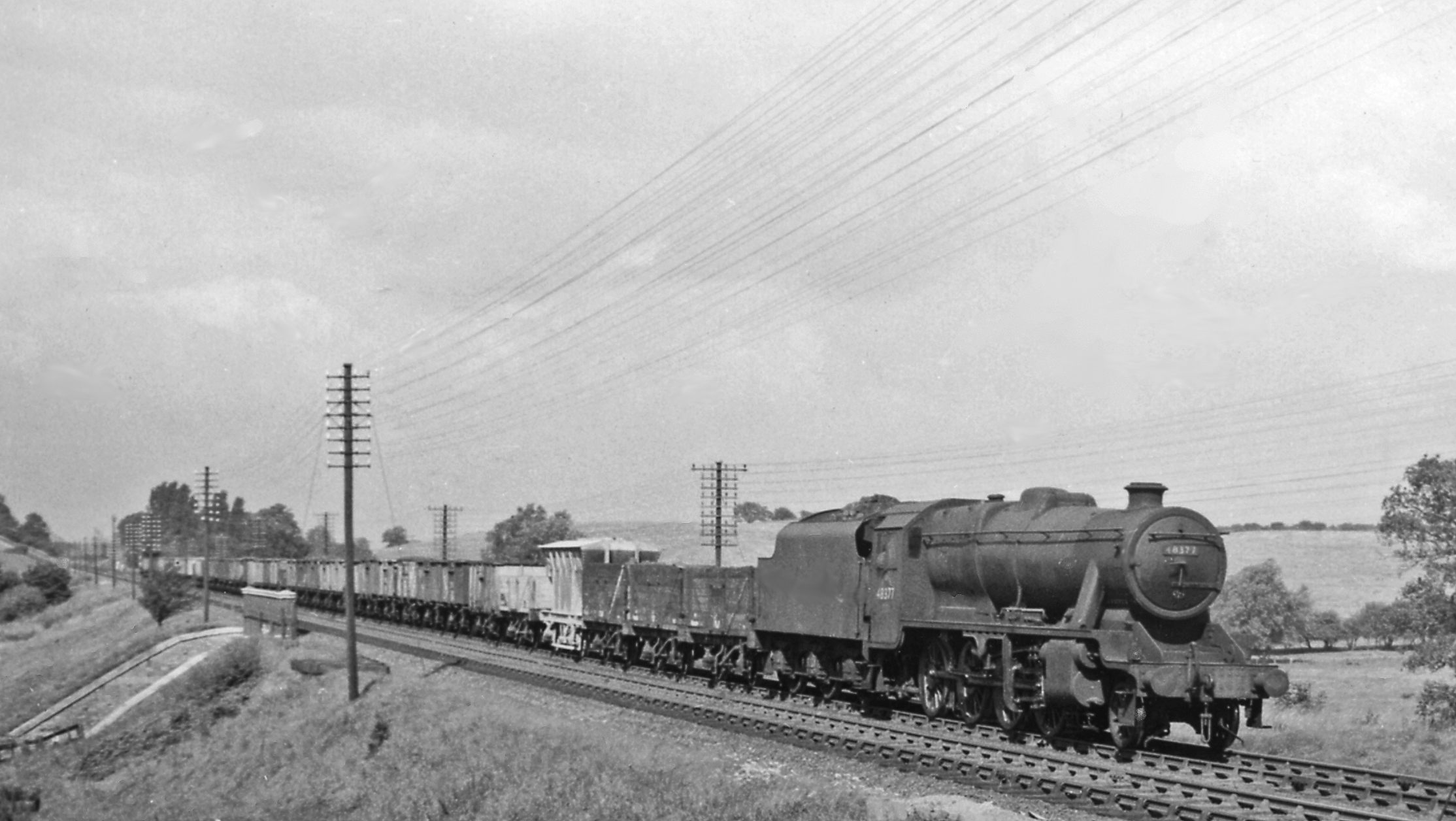
An up coal train near Manton

The Midland Railway served a number of colliery areas, and conveying house coal and industrial fuel to large population areas became dominant. Moving manufactured goods away from towns where production took place was also important. Over time there was a massive flow of minerals from the North and East Midland coalfields to southern towns and cities, chiefly London, and also to the agricultural districts of East Anglia and Lincolnshire. All the wagons had to be sorted according to their specific destination, and of course all the wagons had to be returned empty to the collieries after discharge. The Midland Railway had a double track route south from Trent through Leicester, and it was heavily congested. As well as the principal long-distance passenger expresses, there was a huge volume of mineral traffic. These trains tended to be slow moving and often had to wait in refuge sidings alongside the main line, pending the availability of reception sidings at yards nearer their destination. The main line was still largely double track and in consequence congestion and delay was widespread.

From the later 1870s, the main line was progressively quadrupled south of Kettering, with easier gradients going south. The most important of these works was the Wymington Deviation, a 3 1/2 mile line opened on 4 May 1884. It had a ruling gradient of 1 in 200 rather than the long 1 in 120 climb on the original main line; there is a 1,860 yard tunnel. This gave the heavy southbound coal trains, mostly hauled by small Johnson 0-6-0 locomotives, a gentler climb, enabling them to take longer loaded trains. North of Kettering a different solution was proposed.

== A direct line ==
Throughout the latter half of the nineteenth century the North Midland Coalfield expanded in volume of coal produced; elsewhere on the Midland Railway system north and west of the city of Nottingham coal production was increasing. Steadily this worsened the already difficult situation on the main line. In particular the area around Trent, west of Nottingham, was heavily congested as it was the focus of main lines from north, west and east. The Midland Railway decided to provide a new route through Nottingham to Kettering.

The existing route to Leicester and London led west from Nottingham station; the new route was to run from the east end of Nottingham station and turn south-east to pass near Melton Mowbray and converge with the Nottingham to Peterborough line at Saxby. A second section of new line would diverge from the Peterborough line at Manton, and run south through Corby to Rushton, (Note: When built, the junction was known as Glendon South Junction, but Rushton is used interchangeably in source materials.) near Kettering. This would provide an additional two tracks southward from Nottingham, making the southern main line effectively quadruple track. At the same time the Trowell to Radford Line was being planned. North-west of Nottingham it would bring southbound trains from Chesterfield more directly into Nottingham. Together these lines would enable southbound mineral trains to avoid the congested main line and the Trent complex. The Radford to Trowell Line opened on 1 May 1875.

== 1871 Midland bill ==
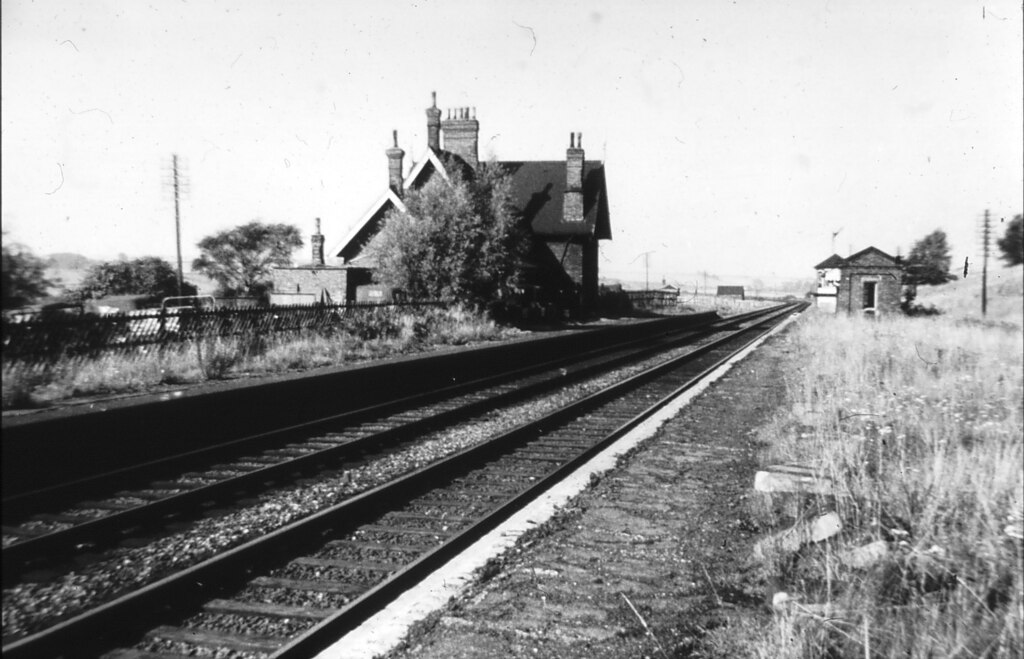
Harringworth station

In November 1871 the Midland Railway deposited a bill before Parliament entitled the "Nottingham and Rushton Lines Bill". It proposed a line between Nottingham and Saxby, 21 1/2 miles long. It would pass some distance north of Melton Mowbray, and generally duplicate the Melton to Saxby section of the existing Peterborough line. The "Manton and Rushton Line" was a route 14 miles long between Manton on the Syston and Peterborough Railway, and Rushton on the Midland Main Line, north of Kettering. Included in the proposals was a spur linking the Nottingham and Saxby line to Melton Mowbray station.

In the same parliamentary session the rival Great Northern Railway (GNR) promoted a bill for a line south from Newark through Melton to Leicester; new stations would be built in Leicester and Melton Mowbray. The actual promoter of this scheme was William Firth, a Yorkshire industrialist, and a director of the Great Northern Railway.

Although the Midland scheme was broadly west to east and the GNR line would be north to south, there was considered to be much duplication in the two bills, and each bill's promoters criticised and deprecated their opponents' scheme.

The resulting Midland Railway (Nottingham and Saxby Lines) Act 1872 (35 & 36 Vict. c. cxviii) granted the Midland Railway permission to build only part of its Saxby Line from Nottingham to what would have been the junction with the Melton Branch, and the spur to Melton station. This was a bad outcome for the Midland: the act left it with an awkward route to Melton – the route had been chosen to lead to Saxby, not Melton. Even worse, the Manton to Rushton line was lost, preventing the creation of a through relief route. The Midland Railway returned to Parliament the following year with a bill for a more direct line from Nottingham to Melton, which passed unopposed, as the Midland Railway (Additional Powers) Act 1873 (36 & 37 Vict. ccx). After taking stock, the Midland tried again for the Syston to Rushton line, and eventually in 1875 approval was given for a slightly varied route through more difficult terrain.

The Great Northern Railway (Newark and Melton) Act 1872 (35 & 36 Vict. clxvii) authorised a line from Newark to Melton, with spurs at Bottesford to the GNR Nottingham to Grantham line, and to the Midland Railway at Melton, as well as a colliery branch to Waltham. The GNR lost its intended Leicester connection, until a later alliance with the London and North Western Railway achieved that, by making a joint line south of Bottesford.

== Construction and opening ==
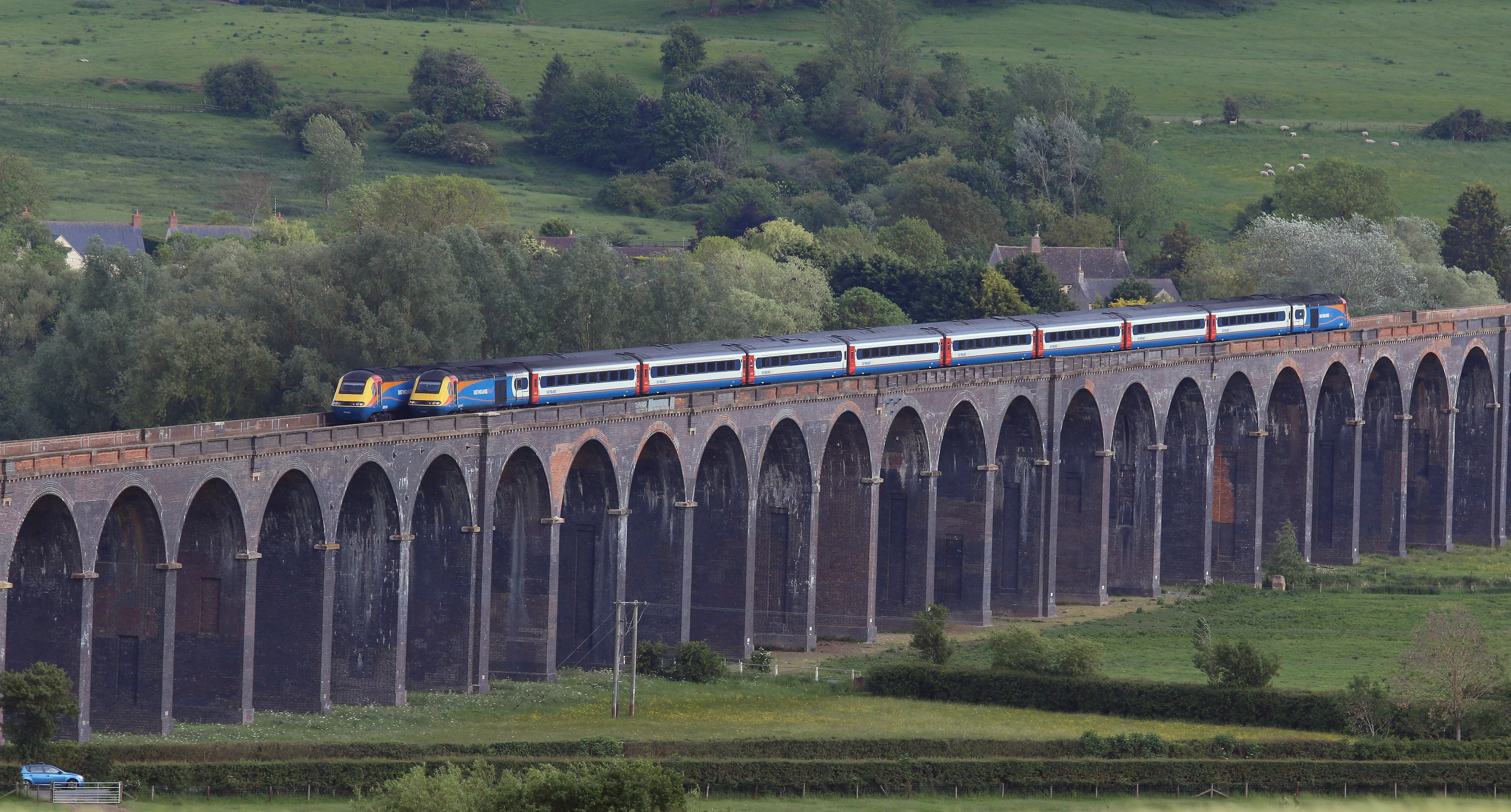
Two trains on Harringworth viaduct

So the Midland Railway had authorisation for a cut-down scheme: Nottingham to Melton and Syston to Rushton. Both sections were designed for fast running by heavy trains, so earthworks were considerable to ensure gentle gradients. In order to carry the line across the wide valley of the River Welland north of Corby, a long viaduct was required, the railway passing through tunnels to the north and south of it. Called Harringworth Viaduct, it is the longest viaduct on the British Railway system excluding those carrying the London suburban lines. It has 82 arches and a maximum height of 70 feet. The contractor fell behind in the schedule for building the line, and the Midland had to get an extension of time, in the Midland Railway (Additional Powers) Act 1878 (41 & 42 Vict. c. xcvi).

Construction was substantially complete by late 1879 and goods trains started running over the line from 1 November 1879 between Melton and Nottingham, and from 1 December 1879 for mineral trains and 1 January 1880 for goods trains between Manton and Glendon. The volume of goods traffic in those days was such that eleven through goods trains ran daily between Melton and Nottingham, before the Manton to Rushton section was open. Major Marindin performed the Board of Trade inspection, mandatory for new passenger railways, in the second week of January 1880. Marindin expressed himself well satisfied, and passenger operation between Nottingham and Melton started on 2 February 1880. Manton to Kettering followed on 1 March 1880 and through express passenger trains started using the route from 1 June 1880.

== Train services ==
Writing in 1932, Hamilton described the train services at Nottingham station:

This is the route used by the London expresses [to and from Nottingham] (save for one or two semi-fasts via Leicester), of which there are 10 down and 9 up daily. Two down expresses the 9:00 am and 1:50 pm from St. Pancras, and one up, the 11:15 from Nottingham, cover the 123½ miles non stop in 2 1/4 hours (the former actually takes 134 minutes). The local services rather sparse, most stations to Melton having but 9 down trains and 8 up… On Sundays there is an early morning local each way and a down and up express in the evening but for the rest of the day the line is entirely closed. In addition to the London trains there are two in each direction for the Midland and Great Northern Joint line via Saxby...

== Organisational change, and mounting losses ==
In 1923 the Midland Railway became a constituent of the new London Midland and Scottish Railway (LMS) in a process known as the "Grouping", following the Railways Act 1921. In 1948 further organisational change was imposed by Government, and the state-owned British Railways was formed, taking over the LMS and other companies. The decline in use of railways, as road transport became more efficient and convenient, resulted in increasing financial losses for the railways, and in the 1960s it was clear that drastic action needed to be taken. A number of closures were proposed, both of groups of local stations and also of what were considered to be duplicate main lines. The Nottingham – Melton and Manton – Rushton sections were considered to be candidates for closure.

== Decline and closure ==
There were complications about the closure; at the time this became a serious proposal, the West Coast Main Line railway was being electrified, and express passenger trains were being carried on alternative routes, including the Melton Mowbray route. Closure was deferred until the relevant part of the WCML electrification work was complete. Then closure to local trains was approved, and took place on 18 April 1966. Approval for complete closure to through express passenger trains was withheld, and one daily express train each way was retained. The Minister gave consent to re-routing the expresses on 22 March 1967, and the last scheduled passenger express to use the line was probably the 17:55 St Pancras - Sheffield express on Saturday 29 April 1967. Freight trains continued to use the line, but the permitted maximum speed on the line was reduced to 45 mph, the normal operating speed of ordinary goods trains at the time.

The line between Corby and Glendon Junction was singled in 1986, but it was doubled once more from September 2014, to allow freight trains to be diverted off the main line, the original reason for building the line in 1879.

== Research Department use ==
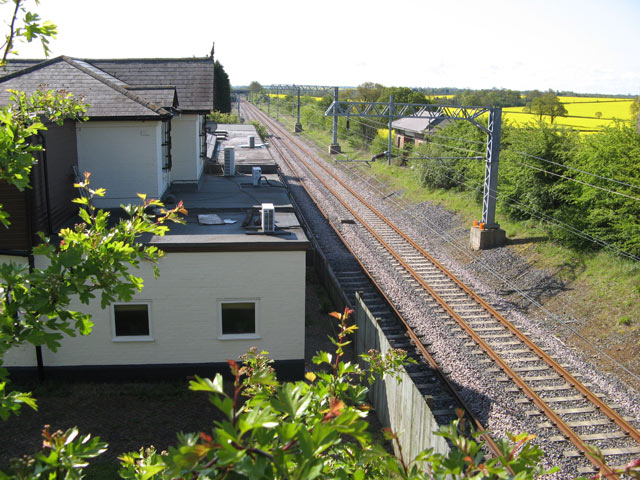
Old Dalby test track

The Research Department at Derby were keen to retain part of the route for testing novel rolling stock, particularly the future Advanced Passenger Train. Negotiations for this use were protracted, but once the line finally closed to revenue earning traffic, fourteen miles of the Down line would be prepared for high-speed trials, from a point south of Asfordby Tunnel to just south of Edwalton station. The line was closed to ordinary traffic from 4 November 1968, and the experimental section became known as Old Dalby Test Track. A further complication was that there was a Ministry of Defence depot at Old Dalby. This compromised the dedicated use of the line for research purposes and it was not easily relinquished at first. However the facility was given up, and closed on 6 October 1969.

The connection to the iron workings at Holwell, a short distance from Melton Mowbray, was also in use by the Ministry of Defence, as well as commercial traffic. This was retained for the time being, and the dedicated research department use was on the former down line from Holwell Junction northwards. In fact the Holwell sidings traffic declined steeply after 1969, and the facility was closed on 1 August 1980.

== Asfordby colliery ==
A new colliery was planned at Asfordby, and from the start of 1985, work began to the west of the old Welby sidings to reinstate the track through Asfordby tunnel, and a new south-east curve at Holwell Junction, enabling direct running from the pit to a power station. This was commissioned on 6 January 1991. However the colliery proved unsuccessful and it was closed on 18 August 1997 after two years of full production.

== Corby revival ==
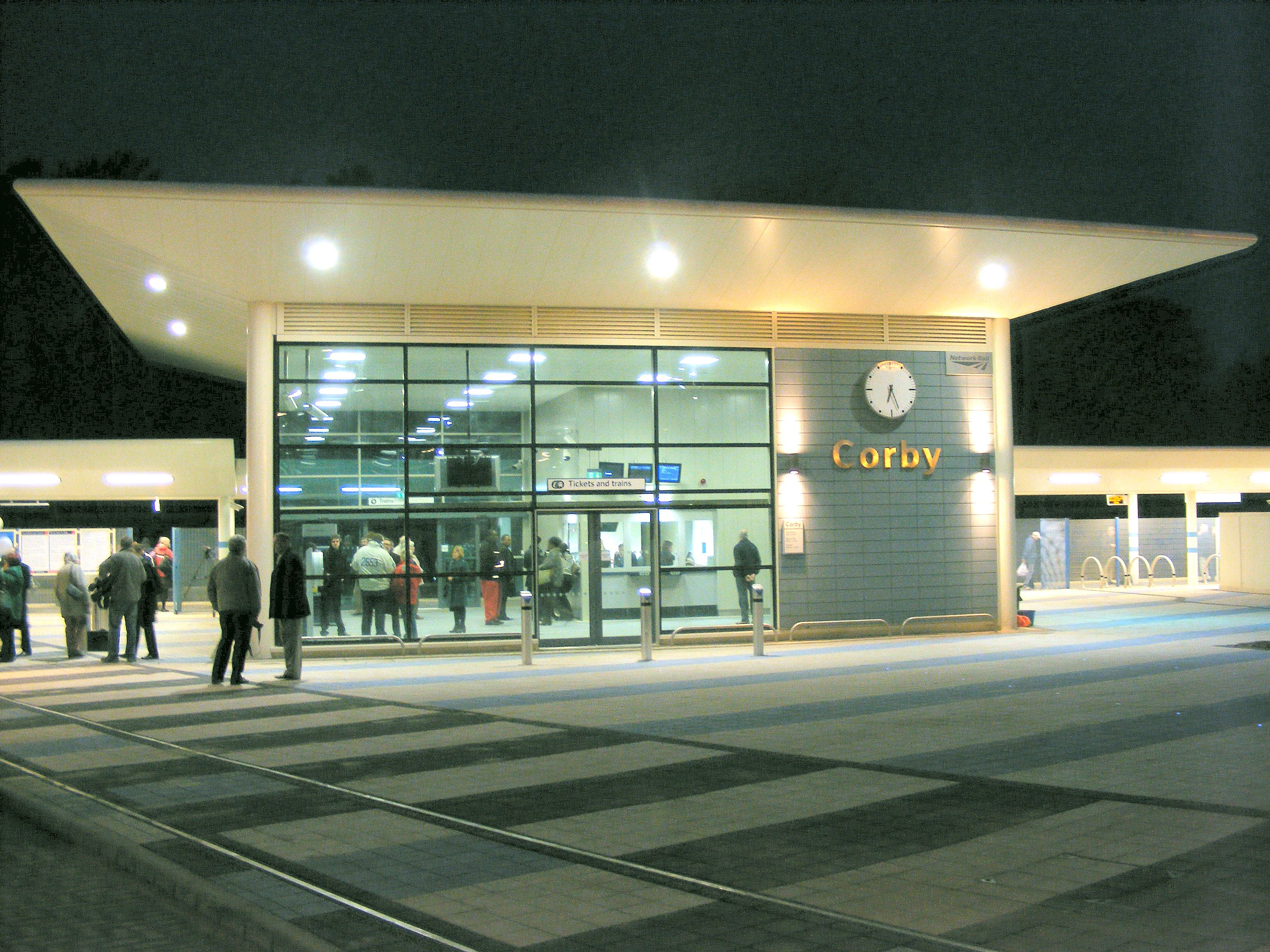
Corby railway station in 2009

The Manton to Rushton line passed through areas of iron ore deposits, and on a modest scale the mineral had been dug for many decades, the first iron furnaces having been installed in 1910. In 1934 Stewarts and Lloyds established what was to become a very large steelworks at Corby. This involved the relocation of many skilled steelworkers from Scotland and elsewhere, and transformed Corby from a village into a considerable town. The Corby Quarries lines totalled about 102 miles by 1960. The population had risen to 61,300 in 2011, having been 1,022 in 1901.

When the closure of the route south of Manton took place in April 1966, Corby became the only Parliamentary Constituency with no passenger rail service. After years of campaigning, British Rail agreed to provide a shuttle service between Corby and Kettering, with a subsidy from Corby Council. The service started on 13 April 1987 with an hourly service; the journey time was 13 minutes. Butler says that the conductor did not have time to collect all the fares, with the result that for many it was a free service. With losses mounting and the Council unwilling to continue funding, the last train ran on 2 June 1990.

A new Corby station opened on 23 February 2009, initially served by one return train per day to London St Pancras, operated by East Midlands Trains. A fuller service, with 13 daily return trains to London, started on 27 April 2009.

The line from Kettering to Corby has been electrified, as from 16 May 2021.

The train service at Corby is (Summer 2022) about half-hourly to London, with two trains daily from Melton Mowbray through Corby to Kettering. Corby has a Sunday service that is slightly irregular, but better than hourly.

== Locations ==
=== Nottingham to Melton Mowbray ===
- Nottingham; present station opened 22 May 1848; still open;
- London Road Junction; divergence from Lincoln line;
- Edwalton; opened 2 February 1880; closed 28 July 1941;
- Plumtree; opened 2 February 1880; closed 28 February 1949;
- Widmerpool; opened 2 February 1880; closed 28 February 1949;
- Upper Broughton; opened 2 February 1880; closed 31 May 1948;
- Old Dalby; opened February 1880; closed 18 April 1966;
- Grimston; opened 2 February 1880; closed 4 February 1957;
- Holwell Sidings Junction; junction to Eaton Colliery 1887 – 1963;
- Asfordby Junction; junction from Asfordby Colliery 1990 -
- Melton Junction; junction from Syston.

=== Syston to Kettering ===
- Manton; opened 1 May 1848; closed 6 June 1966;
- Harringworth; opened 1 March 1880; closed 1 November 1948;
- Gretton; opened 1 March 1880; closed 18 April 1966;
- Corby & Cottingham; opened 1 March 1880; renamed Weldon 1 November 1880; renamed Weldon & Corby 1 November 1881; renamed Corby & Weldon 1 May 1937; renamed Corby 4 March 1957; closed 18 April 1966; returned to occasional use from 1 July 1984; fully open 13 April 1987; closed 4 June 1990; reopened 23 February 2009; still open;
- Geddington; opened 1 March 1880; closed 1 November 1948;
- Glendon South Junction; junction from Market Harborough 1857 to date;
- Kettering; main line station; opened 8 May 1857; still open.
