= St Luke's Church, Hickling =

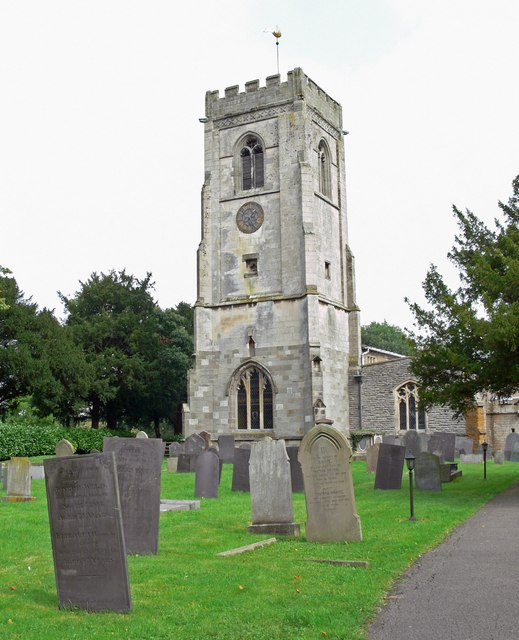
- St Luke's Church, Hickling
- St Luke's Church, Hickling
- 52°51′23.68″N 0°58′27.1″W
- OS grid reference: SK 69188 29279
- Location: Hickling, Nottinghamshire
- Country: England
- Denomination: Church of England

History
- Dedication: St Luke

Architecture
- Heritage designation: Grade I listed

Administration
- Diocese: Diocese of Southwell and Nottingham
- Archdeaconry: Nottingham
- Deanery: East Bingham
- Parish: Hickling

St Luke's Church, Hickling is a Grade I listed parish church in the Church of England in Hickling, Nottinghamshire.

== History ==
It was built in the 14th century. The chancel was rebuilt in 1845, and the tower in 1873. A general restoration was carried out in 1886.

It is in a joint parish with two other churches of the same dedication:

- St Luke's Church, Broughton Sulney
- St Luke's Church, Kinoulton

== Memorials ==
A brass on the chancel floor of 1521 to Master Ralph Babington, rector.

== Organ ==
The church contains a pipe organ by Bryceson. A specification of the organ can be found on the National Pipe Organ Register.

== See also ==
- Grade I listed buildings in Nottinghamshire
- Listed buildings in Hickling, Nottinghamshire
