= Listed buildings in Hickling, Nottinghamshire =

Hickling is a civil parish in the Rushcliffe district of Nottinghamshire, England. The parish contains 30 listed buildings that are recorded in the National Heritage List for England. Of these, one is listed at Grade I, the highest of the three grades, and the others are at Grade II, the lowest grade. The parish contains the village of Hickling and the surrounding countryside. The Grantham Canal passes through the parish, and the listed buildings associated with it are mileposts, an aqueduct and a former warehouse. The other listed buildings include houses, cottages and associated structures, farmhouses and farm buildings, a church, and headstones and a tomb in the churchyard.

== Key ==
Grade	Criteria
I	Buildings of exceptional interest, sometimes considered to be internationally important
II	Buildings of national importance and special interest

== Buildings ==
Name and location	Photograph	Date	Notes	Grade
St Luke's Church; 52.85659°N 0.97381°W		14th century	The church has been altered and extended through the centuries, the chancel was rebuilt in 1845, the tower was restored in 1871–73, and there was a general restoration in 1886. The church is built in stone with lead roofs, and consists of a nave, lean-to north and south aisles, a south porch, a chancel and a west tower. The tower has three stages, angle buttresses, a three-light west window, two-light bell openings, a decorative frieze, and an embattled parapet. The porch and the chancel are also embattled. Built into the west wall of the south aisle is a 14th-century coffin lid with relief caving.	I
Bowling Green Cottage; 52.85124°N 0.97356°W		Late 17th century	The earliest part of the cottage, which was at one time a public house, is timber framed with brick infill, partly rendered, the later extensions are in brick, and it has a pantile roof. There are two storeys, and inside the cottage is retained timber framing.	II
Headstones west of the tower 52.85660°N 0.97414°W		1698	The group of eight headstones is in the churchyard of St Luke's Church. One is in limestone, and the others are in slate. The headstones are of various shapes, they are dated between 1698 and 1789, and they carry different carvings and inscriptions.	II
Headstones south of the south aisle 52.85640°N 0.97383°W		1701	The group of 17 headstones is in the churchyard of St Luke's Church, most are in slate and some are in limestone. The headstones are of various shapes, they are dated between 1701 and 1805, and they carry different carvings and inscriptions.	II
Headstones west of the south aisle 52.85650°N 0.97398°W		1704	The group of ten headstones is in the churchyard of St Luke's Church, and most are in slate. The headstones are of various shapes, they are dated between 1704 and 1805, and they carry different carvings and inscriptions.	II
Group of headstones between the south porch and the tower 52.85641°N 0.97396°W		1707	The group of 20 headstones is in the churchyard of St Luke's Church, and they are in slate. The headstones are of various shapes, they are dated between 1707 and 1746, and they carry different carvings and inscriptions.	II
Headstone southwest of south aisle 52.85639°N 0.97414°W		1713	The headstone in the churchyard of St Luke's Church is in slate, and to the memory of children of the Daft family who died between 1713 and 1723. At the top are carvings of two round-faced winged angels, and below are inscriptions.	II
Headstones west of the Mann tomb chest 52.85651°N 0.97415°W		1723	The group of three headstones in the churchyard of St Luke's Church in slate. The headstones are of various shapes, they are dated between 1723 and 1770, and they carry different carvings and inscriptions.	II
Two headstones southwest of the south aisle 52.85627°N 0.97412°W		1735	A pair of headstones in the churchyard of St Luke's Church, rectangular and in slate. One is to the memory of Elizabeth Morely, who died in 1735, and has the carving of a round-faced winged angel and raised letters. The other is to Mary Stringer, who died in 1737, and has a moulded surround, and relief carvings of winged cherubs' heads, bones and a skull.	II
Chestnut House; 52.85358°N 0.97495°W		Early 18th century	The house, which was extended in the 19th century, is in brick, and has a pantile roof with coped gables and kneelers. There are two storeys and attics, a main range of two bays, a lower extension to the right, and a lower rear wing. On the front is a canted bay window, to the right of which is an open porch incorporating another bay window., and above this is a bow window.	II
Dell Farmhouse; 52.83962°N 0.99457°W		Early 18th century	The farmhouse, which was extended to the rear in the 19th century, is in painted brick with a slate roof. There are two storeys, a main range of three bays, and two lower gabled rear wings. The doorway has a moulded surround and a small hood on moulded brackets, and the windows are tripartite, some with horizontally-sliding sashes.	II
Sulney Cottage; 52.85643°N 0.97458°W		Early 18th century	A brick house that has a slate roof with coped gables, two storeys and three bays. On the front is a lean-to porch and a bay window to the right, and the upper floor contains casement windows with segmental heads.	II
Church Farmhouse; 52.85578°N 0.97489°W		Mid 18th century	The farmhouse is in brick with an eaves cornice and a tile roof. There are two storeys and four bays. The doorway has a hood, and the windows are tripartite casements, those in the ground floor with segmental heads.	II
Cobblestones; 52.85118°N 0.97471°W		Late 18th century	A brick house, partly rendered, with a slate roof and coped gables with kneelers. There are two storeys and attics, and a symmetrical front of three bays. The central doorway has a fanlight and a hood on shaped brackets, and the windows are tripartite horizontally-sliding sashes.	II
Canal aqueduct 52.85759°N 0.93959°W		Late 18th century	The aqueduct carries the Grantham Canal over the River Smite. It is in brick, and consists of a single basket arch with three courses of brick voussoirs, and has deep swept sides acting as buttresses.	II
Canal milepost 13 miles from the River Trent; 52.85833°N 0.98024°W		Late 18th century	The milepost is on the north side of the Grantham Canal, and is in cast iron. It consists of a post with a rounded top and a moulded edge, inscribed with the distance from the River Trent.	II
Canal milepost 13¼ miles from the River Trent; 52.85864°N 0.97410°W		Late 18th century	The milepost is on the north side of the Grantham Canal, and is in cast iron. It consists of a post with a rounded top and a moulded edge, inscribed with the distance from the River Trent.	II
Canal milepost 13¾ miles from the River Trent; 52.85904°N 0.96130°W		Late 18th century	The milepost is on the north side of the Grantham Canal, and is in cast iron. It consists of a post with a rounded top and a moulded edge, inscribed with the distance from the River Trent.	II
Canal milepost 14¾ miles from the River Trent; 52.85637°N 0.94974°W		Late 18th century	The milepost is on the northeast side of the Grantham Canal, and is in cast iron. It consists of a post with a rounded top and a moulded edge, inscribed with the distance from the River Trent.	II
The Elms Farmhouse; 52.85505°N 0.97506°W		Late 18th century	The farmhouse is in brick with a slate roof, two storeys and attics, and three bays. The central round-arched doorway has an architrave, a fanlight, and a hood on brackets. To its right is a square bay window, above it is a round-arched window, and the other windows on the front are casements. In the gable ends are small horizontally-sliding sash windows.	II
The Rectory; 52.85692°N 0.97421°W		Late 18th century	The rectory was considerably enlarged in the early 19th century. It is in brick, with roofs of tile, pantile and slate, it has an H-shaped plan, and is in two and three storeys. Most of the windows are sashes, there is a square bay window, and the doorway has an architrave, a fanlight and a cornice.	II
Mulberry House; 52.85170°N 0.97479°W	—	1778	The house is in red brick with an eaves cornice and a tile roof. There are two storeys and attics, and three bays. Flanking the central doorway are bow windows, the upper floor contains casement windows, and above the central window is a dated and initialled plaque.	II
Malthouse Farmhouse; 52.85108°N 0.97471°W		c.1800	The house is in brick with a dentilled eaves cornice and a tile roof. There are three storeys and a symmetrical front of three bays. The central doorway has a fanlight and a hood on shaped brackets. The windows are casements, those in the lower two floors with segmental heads, and at the rear is an oriel window on a scrolled support.	II
Former Canal Warehouse; 52.85805°N 0.97481°W		Late 18th or early 19th century	The canal warehouse, later used for other purposes, is in brick with a dentilled eaves cornice and a pantile roof. There are two storeys and a rectangular plan, with a continuous rear outshut. It contains a large entrance, and small windows, those in the ground floor with segmental heads.	II
Elm House; 52.84852°N 0.97518°W	—	Late 18th or early 19th century	A brick house with a dentilled eaves cornice and a pantile roof. There are two storeys, a main range with a symmetrical front of three bays, and a single-storey lean-to on the left. The doorway is in the centre, and the windows are sashes.	II
Mann Tomb Chest; 52.85652°N 0.97400°W	—	1801	The chest tomb is in the churchyard of St Luke's Church, and is to the memory of members of the Mann family. It is in limestone, and has recessed, fluted, square corner piers, and a moulded base. On the sides are oval panels with inscribed slate tablets.	II
Bridge View House; 52.85824°N 0.97385°W		1803	A public house, later a private house, it is in brick with an eaves cornice and a pantile roof. There are two storeys and attics, a symmetrical front of three bays, and a single-storey rear extension. The central doorway has a round-headed arch, pilasters and a fanlight. Above the doorway is a round-arched window, and the other windows are three-light casements with segmental heads.	II
Jessamine Cottage; 52.85648°N 0.97476°W		Early 19th century (probable)	The cottage is in brick, with dentilled verges and a pantile roof. There are two storeys, a gabled bay at the front, a wing to the left, and a two-bay rear range. The windows in the gabled bay are casements with segmental heads, and in the wing and the rear range they are horizontally-sliding sashes.	II
The Cottage and The Little Cottage; 52.85300°N 0.97465°W		Early 19th century	A pair of brick cottages with a pantile roof sweeping lower at the rear. There are two storeys, three bays and a lower rear wing. On the front are two doorways, the windows are casements, and all the openings have segmental heads.	II
Stables, The Rectory; 52.85708°N 0.97435°W	—	Early 19th century	The stable block is in brick with a square plan, and has a pyramidal slate roof, on which is an open octagonal lantern with a pyramidal roof, a ball finial and a weathervane. It contains doorways, windows, and high level pitching holes, all with segmental heads.	II
