= Listed buildings in Upper Broughton =

Upper Broughton is a civil parish in the Rushcliffe district of Nottinghamshire, England. The parish contains 17 listed buildings that are recorded in the National Heritage List for England. Of these, one is listed at Grade I, the highest of the three grades, and the others are at Grade II, the lowest grade. The parish contains the village of Upper Broughton and the surrounding countryside. Most of the listed buildings are houses, cottages, farmhouses and associated structures. The others include a church, headstones and a war memorial in the churchyard, the churchyard wall and gates, a village cross, and a former chapel.

== Key ==
Grade	Criteria
I	Buildings of exceptional interest, sometimes considered to be internationally important
II	Buildings of national importance and special interest

== Buildings ==
Name and location	Photograph	Date	Notes	Grade
St Luke's Church; 52.82943°N 0.98708°W		c. 1200	The church has been altered and extended through the centuries, and in 1854–55 the north aisle and the chancel were rebuilt by S. S. Teulon. Much of the church is built in ironstone, the porch is in sandstone, the chancel in blue lias, and the dressings are in limestone, the chancel roof is tiled, and the other roofs are in lead. The church consists of a nave with a clerestory on the north side, a north aisle, a south porch, a chancel, and a west tower. The tower has two stages, clasping buttresses, a west lancet window, two-light bell openings, and a quatrefoil frieze under an embattled parapet. The porch has a re-set quatrefoil frieze, and a round portal, within which is a fragment of a Norman tympanum.	I
Village cross 52.82808°N 0.99077°W		Medieval	The cross is in limestone. It consists of a square short shaft on a deep base, on a worn podium.	II
Willow Cottage; 52.82786°N 0.99114°W		Late 17th century	The cottage was extended later with the addition of a parallel rear wing in brick. There are two storeys, and both ranges have pantile roofs. The original range is timber framed with roughcast infill, four bays and casement windows.	II
Tudor Cottage; 52.82773°N 0.99607°W		Late 17th century	The house is timber framed with brick nogging, and has a pantile roof. There are two storeys and six bays, a lean-to on the right, and a lower rear wing. On the front is a doorway, and the windows are casements.	II
Headstones to the east of the porch, St Luke's Church; 52.82930°N 0.98693°W		Early 18th century	A group of 13 headstones, most in slate, and some in limestone. They have differing shapes, decoration and inscriptions, and the dates range from 1701 to 1767.	II
Headstones to the west of the porch, St Luke's Church; 52.82921°N 0.98708°W		18th century	A group of 19 headstones all in slate. They have differing shapes, decoration and inscriptions, and the dates range from 1700 to 1795.	II
Headstones to the west of the tower, St Luke's Church; 52.82937°N 0.98736°W		18th century	A group of 33 headstones all in slate. They have differing shapes, decoration and inscriptions, and the dates range from 1704 to 1836.	II
Hill Farmhouse; 52.82804°N 0.98774°W		Late 18th century	The farmhouse is in rendered brick, and has a hipped slate roof. There are three storeys, a front of two bays, and a single-storey rear wing with a pantile roof. The central doorway has fluted pilasters on pedestals, a shallow segmental fanlight, a dentilled cornice, and a shallow triangular pediment. Most of the windows are sashes and in the left return are casements.	II
Willow Farmhouse; 52.82775°N 0.99040°W		Late 18th century	The farmhouse is in roughcast brick, and has a slate roof with chamfered brickwork to the verges, and coped gables with square kneelers and stone finials. There are two storeys, a main range of two bays, a central stair wing at the rear, and a later wing to the left. The windows are sashes with moulded surrounds. On the front is a dated and initialled lead rainwater head, and a dated and initialled lead cistern decorated with shields and beasts.	II
The Old Chapel; 52.82873°N 0.98685°W		1795	A porch was added to the chapel in about 1900, and it has since been converted into a private house. The house is in brick, with a dentilled eaves cornice at the rear, and a blue slate roof. There are two storeys, and a symmetrical front. The porch has a dentilled eaves cornice, and it obscures the lower part of a round-arched window and two round-arched entrances. Above are two fixed-light windows, and between them is a dated slate plaque. In the left return are two fixed lights with segmental heads.	II
White House Farmhouse; 52.82790°N 0.99637°W		Late 18th or early 19th century	The farmhouse is roughcast, with a dentilled eaves cornice and a slate roof. There are two storeys, a main range of three bays, and a long rear wing. The windows are sashes with moulded surrounds.	II
Broughton Grange Farmhouse; 52.84050°N 1.03388°W	—	Early 19th century	The farmhouse is rendered, on a stone plinth, with oversailing eaves and a hipped slate roof. There are two storeys, three bays, and a single-storey rear extension. Steps lead up to the central doorway which has a fanlight and a hood on shaped brackets, and the windows are sashes with moulded surrounds.	II
Broughton House; 52.82851°N 0.98960°W		Early 19th century	A house that was later extended, it is stuccoed, and has a hipped slate roof with oversailing eaves. The main block has three storeys and two bays, and the extension has two storeys and a single bay. The doorway has a segmental fanlight with radial glazing bars, and a hood on shaped brackets. The windows are sashes, and in the extension is a two-storey bow window.	II
Ivy House; 52.82777°N 0.98849°W		Early 19th century	A cottage in red brick with a dentilled eaves cornice and a tile roof. There are two storeys and two bays. The central doorway has a moulded surround and a hood on shaped brackets, and the windows are sashes with moulded surrounds and segmental heads.	II
The Old Rectory; 52.82973°N 0.98642°W		{1854	The former rectory was designed by S. S. Teulon in Gothic Revival style. It is in red brick with blue brick diapering, and has a tile roof. There are two storeys, and two parallel ranges. On the front is an open stone porch with colonnettes and a hood mould, and a darker brick relieving arch. It is flanked by buttresses, above the porch is a canted bay window, and to its left is a dated and inscribed plaque. In the right return is a three-light staircase window and two conservatories, and on the garden front is a two-storey canted bay window and a single-storey square bay window.	II
Coach House, The Old Rectory; 52.82985°N 0.98669°W		c. 1854	The coach house is in red brick with some blue brick diapering, and it has a tiled roof with coloured bands of tiling. It contains a carriage entrance and a stable door with arched heads, and at a higher level is a dovecote opening. There is a narrow window in each gable, and to the left is a lower range.	II
War memorial 52.82914°N 0.98741°W		1920	The war memorial in the churchyard of St Luke's Church is in limestone. It consists of a Celtic cross on a moulded and projecting base, with a tapering shaft and plinth, on a base of two steps. Around the upper step is an inscription.	II
