= John Holloway Sanders =

English railway architect

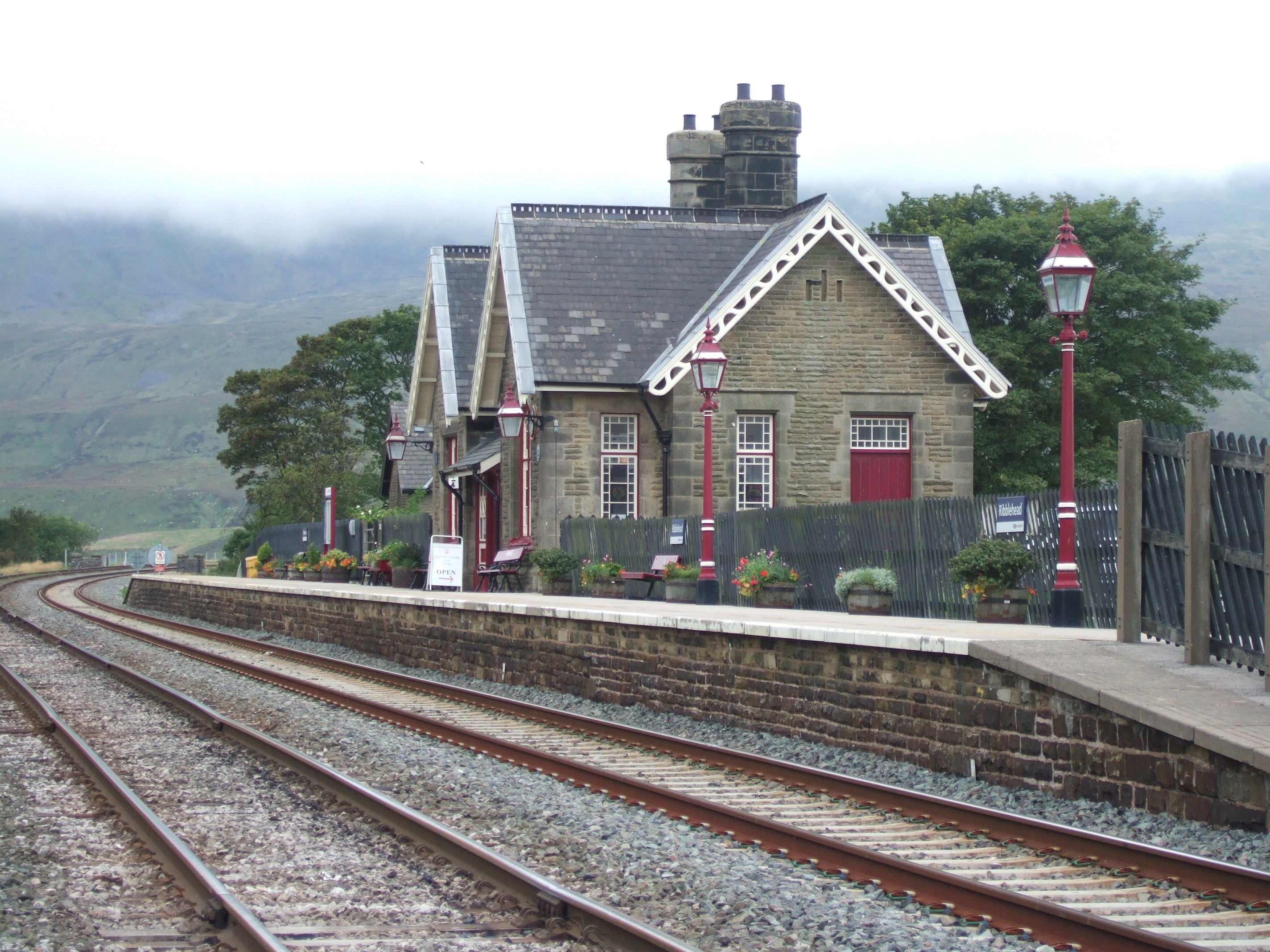
Ribblehead railway station opened in 1876. An example of Derby Gothic by John Holloway Sanders

John Holloway Sanders FRIBA (1825 – 16 October 1884) was an architect based in England and chief architect of the Midland Railway until 1884.

His date of appointment as Chief Architect to the Midland Railway is not known, but he is recorded as working for them in 1845. He is particularly noted for his station buildings on the Settle to Carlisle railway which were all built in a similar style, they became known colloquially as Midland Gothic or Derby Gothic.

He was appointed Fellow of the Royal Institute of British Architects on 22 April 1872.

On his death in 1884, the position of Chief Architect of the Midland Railway went to Charles Trubshaw.

== List of works ==
- St Andrew's Church Schools, London Road, Derby 1863
- Ilkley railway station 1864
- Hazelwood railway station 1867
- Shottle railway station 1867
- Idridgehay railway station 1867
- Wirksworth railway station 1867
- Bath Green Park railway station 1870
- Midland Bridge Bath 1870
- Sheffield railway station 1870
- Unstone railway station 1870
- Dronfield railway station 1870
- Beauchief railway station 1870
- Millhouses and Ecclesall railway station 1870
- Heeley railway station 1870
- Tinsley railway station 1870
- Beauchief railway station 1870
- Chesterfield railway station 1870
- Midland Railway enginemen’s lodging house, Station Approach, Derby 1872
- Dore and Totley railway station 1872
- Thornbury railway station 1872
- Tytherington railway station 1872
- Iron Acton railway station 1872
- Mansfield railway station 1872-75
- Nuneaton Abbey Street railway station 1873
- Market Bosworth railway station 1873
- Shackerstone railway station 1873
- Shenton railway station 1873
- Midland House, Nelson Street, Derby 1873-1874
- Creswell railway station 1875
- Dandry Mire Viaduct 1875
- Shirebrook railway station 1875
- Langwith railway station 1875
- Settle railway station 1876
- Horton-in-Ribblesdale railway station 1876
- Ribblehead railway station 1876
- Dent railway station 1876
- Garsdale railway station 1876
- Kirkby Stephen railway station 1876
- Appleby railway station 1876
- Long Marton railway station 1876
- Culgaith railway station 1880
- New Biggin railway station 1876
- Langwathby railway station 1876
- Little Salkeld railway station 1876
- Lazonby and Kirkoswald railway station 1876
- Armathwaite railway station 1876
- Cotehill railway station 1876
- Cumwhinton railway station 1876
- Scotby railway station 1876
- Edwalton railway station 1879
- Plumtree railway station 1879
- Widmerpool railway station 1879
- Upper Broughton railway station 1879
- Old Dalby railway station 1879
- Grimston railway station 1879
- Derby railway station 1881 Additional platforms, waiting rooms and refreshment rooms
- Arch at the gates of Leicester Campbell Street railway station for a royal visit 1882
- Burton-on-Trent railway station 1883
- Mangotsfield railway station 1883
