= St Luke's Church, Upper Broughton =

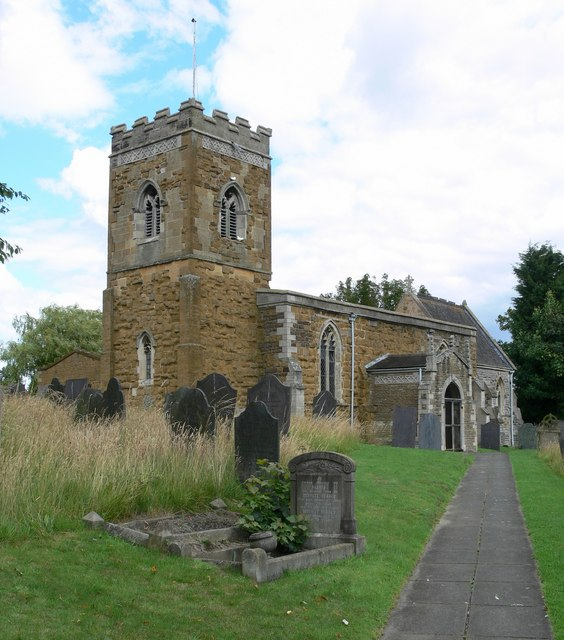
- St Luke's Church, Upper Broughton
- St Luke's Church, Upper Broughton
- 52°49′46.34″N 0°59′13.12″W
- OS grid reference: SK 68342 26238
- Location: Upper Broughton
- Country: England
- Denomination: Church of England

History
- Dedication: St Luke

Architecture
- Heritage designation: Grade I listed

Administration
- Diocese: Diocese of Southwell and Nottingham
- Archdeaconry: Nottingham
- Deanery: East Bingham
- Parish: Upper Broughton

St Luke's Church is a Grade I listed parish church in the Church of England in Upper Broughton.

== History ==
It was built in the 12th century. It was restored in 1855 by S. S. Teulon.

It is in a joint parish with two other churches of the same dedication:

- St Luke's Church, Hickling
- St Luke's Church, Kinoulton

== Memorials ==
Memorials include:

- John Brett, 1788
- Elizabeth, wife of John Brett, 1823 signed Pratt, Nottingham

== Organ ==
A specification of the organ can be found on the National Pipe Organ Register.

== See also ==
- Grade I listed buildings in Nottinghamshire
- Listed buildings in Upper Broughton
