= Gretton railway station =

Former railway station in Northamptonshire, England

Coordinates: 52.5378°N 0.6821°W

Gretton
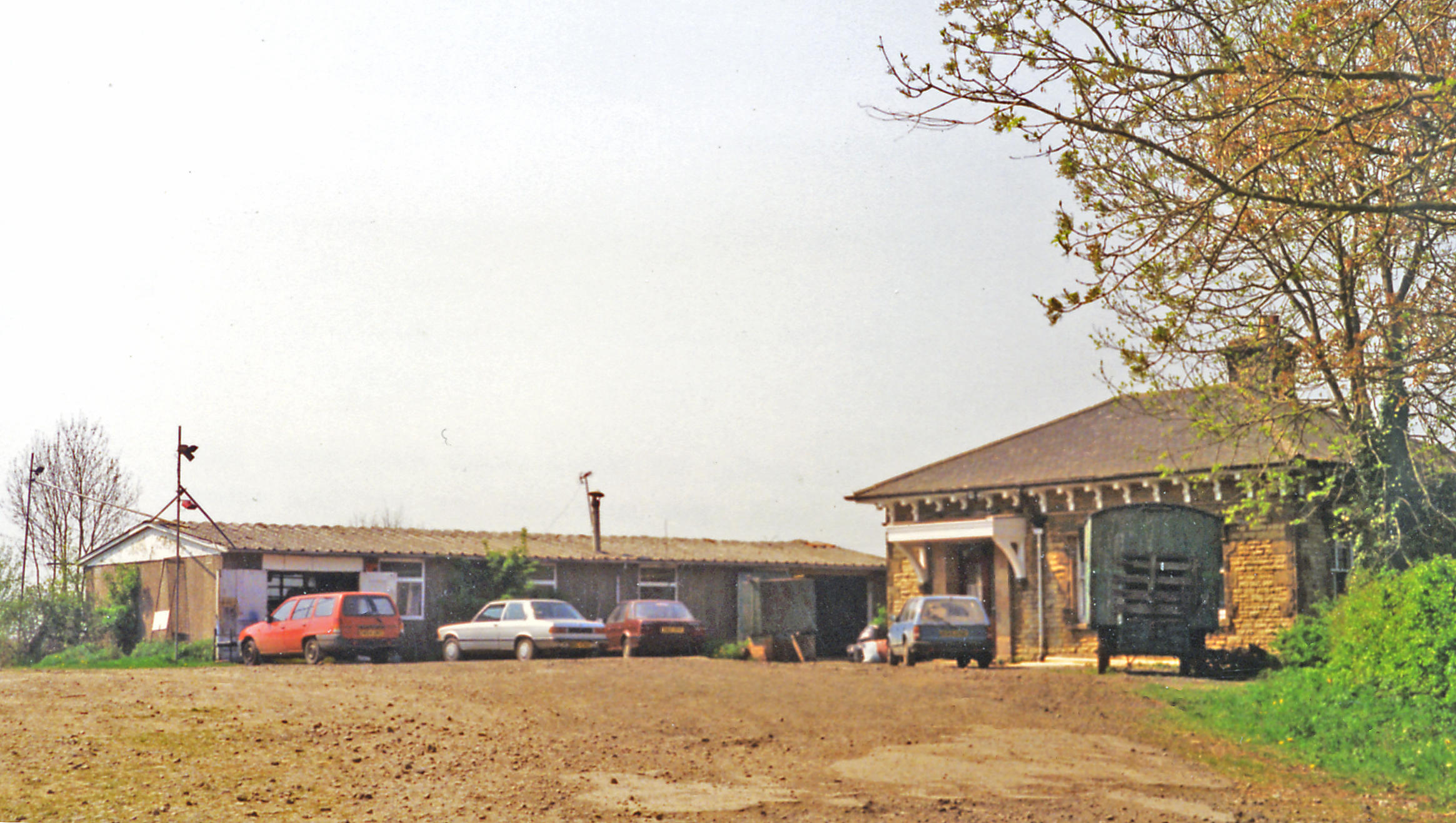
- Remains of the station in 1995

General information
- Location: England
- Platforms: 2

Other information
- Status: Disused

History
- Pre-grouping: Midland Railway
- Post-grouping: London, Midland and Scottish Railway

Key dates
- 1 March 1880: Opened
- 18 April 1966: Closed
Location

Gretton railway station was a railway station near Gretton, Northamptonshire. It was on the Nottingham direct line of the Midland Railway of the Midland Railway. The steps up to the former platforms can still be seen, but the station building itself is in private ownership.

As of 2014 the station buildings still remain, though in private ownership. The station itself is an interesting two storey building situated on a viaduct on the edge of the village - easily visible on the road from Rockingham (which itself has a disused station).

Former Services

Preceding station	Disused railways	Following station
Weldon and Corby	Nottingham direct line of the Midland Railway	Harringworth
