= Hickling, Nottinghamshire =

Village and civil parish in Nottinghamshire, England

Coordinates: 52.8541°N 0.975°W

Hickling
- Village and civil parish
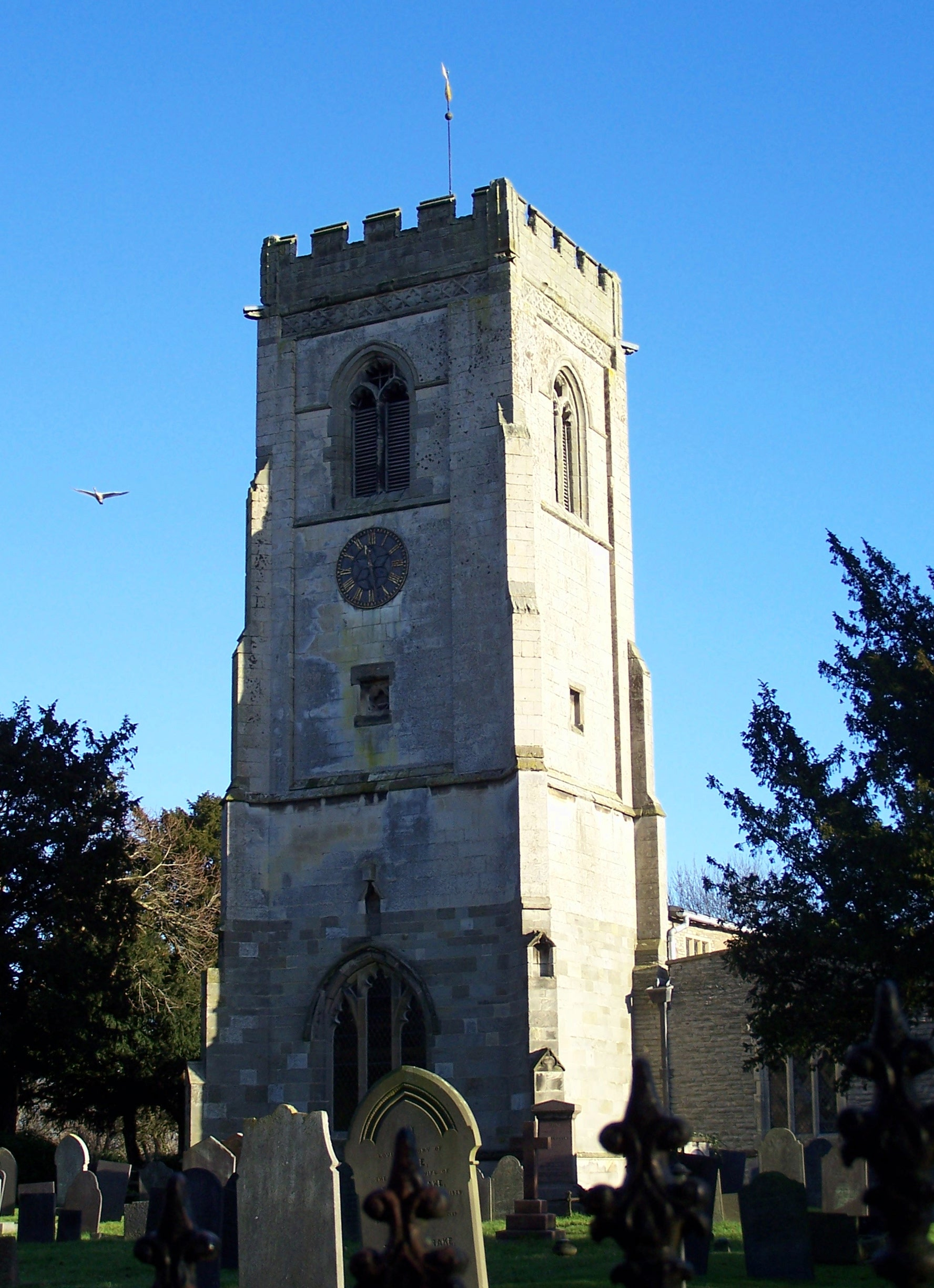
- St Luke's Church

- Location within Nottinghamshire
- Interactive map of Hickling
- Area: 4.46 sq mi (11.6 km^{2})
- Population: 523 (2021)
  - Density: 117/sq mi (45/km^{2})
- OS grid reference: SK 691294
  - London: 100 mi (160 km) SSE
- District: Rushcliffe
- Shire county: Nottinghamshire
- Region: East Midlands
- Country: England
- Sovereign state: United Kingdom
- Post town: MELTON MOWBRAY
- Postcode district: LE14
- Dialling code: 01664
- Police: Nottinghamshire
- Fire: Nottinghamshire
- Ambulance: East Midlands
- UK Parliament: Rushcliffe
- Website: hickling-pc.gov.uk

Hickling is a village in the Rushcliffe borough of Nottinghamshire, England. It is located close to the border with Leicestershire, approximately 8 miles (13 km) northwest of Melton Mowbray; the Vale of Belvoir is also nearby. It had a population of 511 in the 2011 census, increasing to 523 at the 2021 census.

The disused Grantham Canal passes through the village and there is a large basin adjacent to the main road. This would have facilitated loading and mooring when the canal was in use. The basin now attracts a substantial population of swans and ducks. Plans to put the canal back to water include the building of a swing bridge on the main road through the village. Like many bridges along the canal the original one has been flattened and therefore presently prevents navigation of the cut. Some nearby bridges, like the one elsewhere on this page, will need little work to put back to use.

Much of the village lies within a conservation area, which also contains 24 listed buildings. St Luke's Church dates from the 14th century. Inside the church can be found two ornate grave lids that were made for persons of importance and date from the tenth century. Roman coins and medals were found in an urn ploughed up nearby in 1771, and it is suspected that there may have been a Roman base nearby.

Hickling residents are commended for their charity raising skills. The village holds an annual scarecrow festival over a weekend each September. Money raised at that event in 2009 along with the Hickling Country Fair, Open Gardens totalled over £13,500. £4,500 was handed over in February 2010, at a ceremony at the Plough Inn, to each of the Meningitis Trust, the Lincolnshire & Nottinghamshire Air Ambulance, and a further 14 village groups.

== Famous residents ==
American politician Fred M. Warner (1865–1923) was born in Hickling, though he spent most of his life in Michigan, serving as the state's Governor between 1905 and 1911.

British politician Ruth Edwards, former MP for Rushcliffe, resides near Hickling.

== See also ==
- Listed buildings in Hickling, Nottinghamshire

== Gallery ==
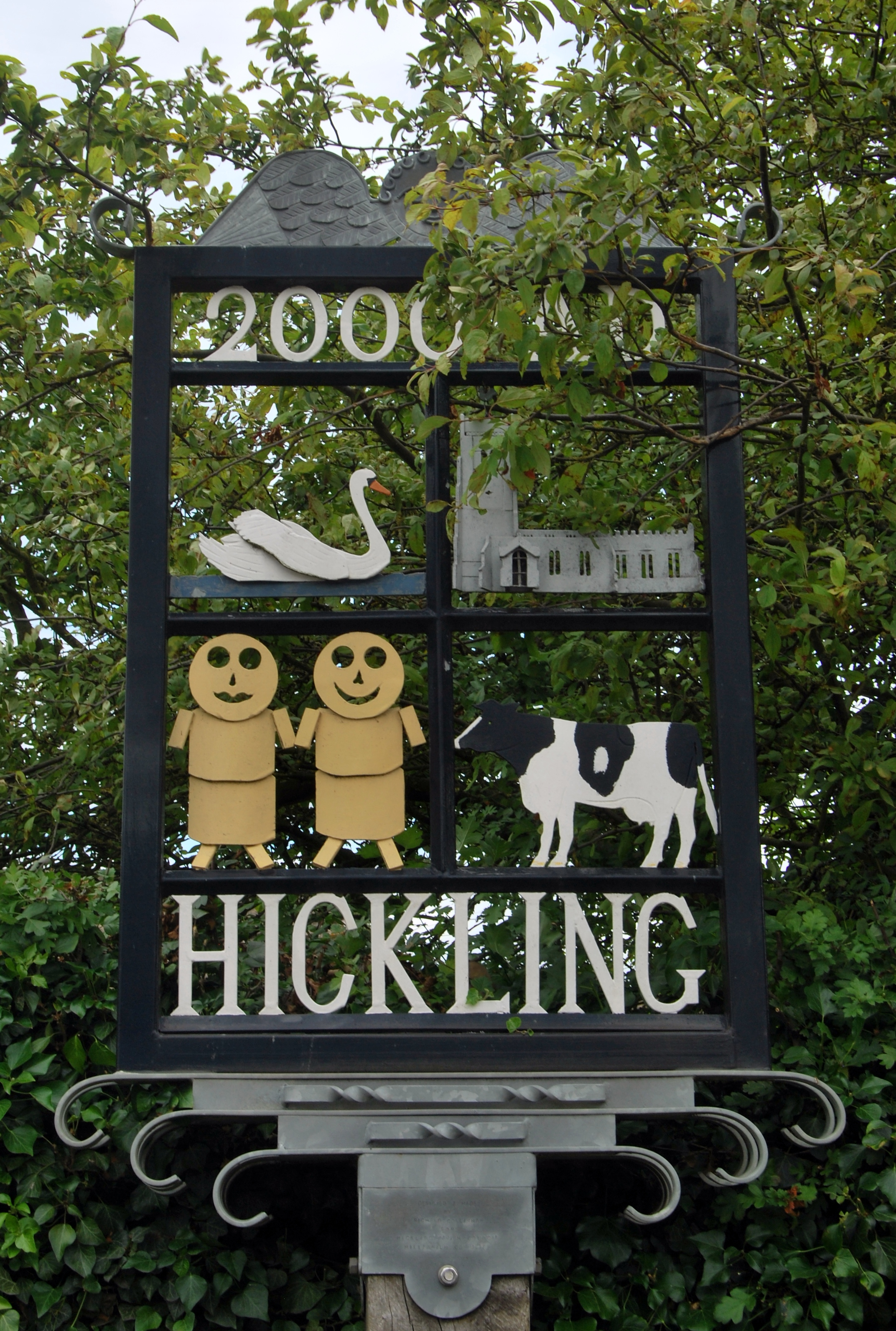
Hickling village sign

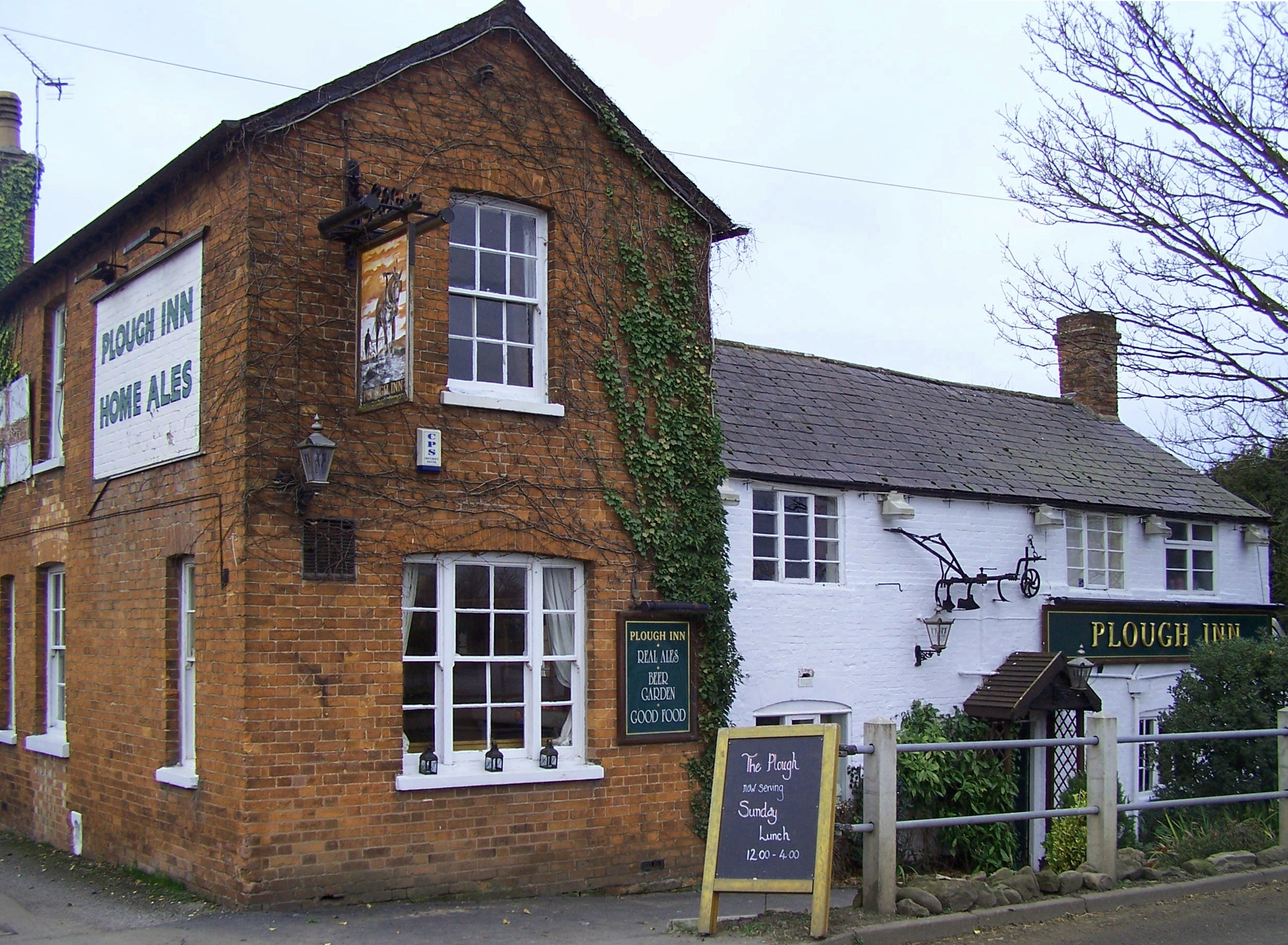
The Plough Inn

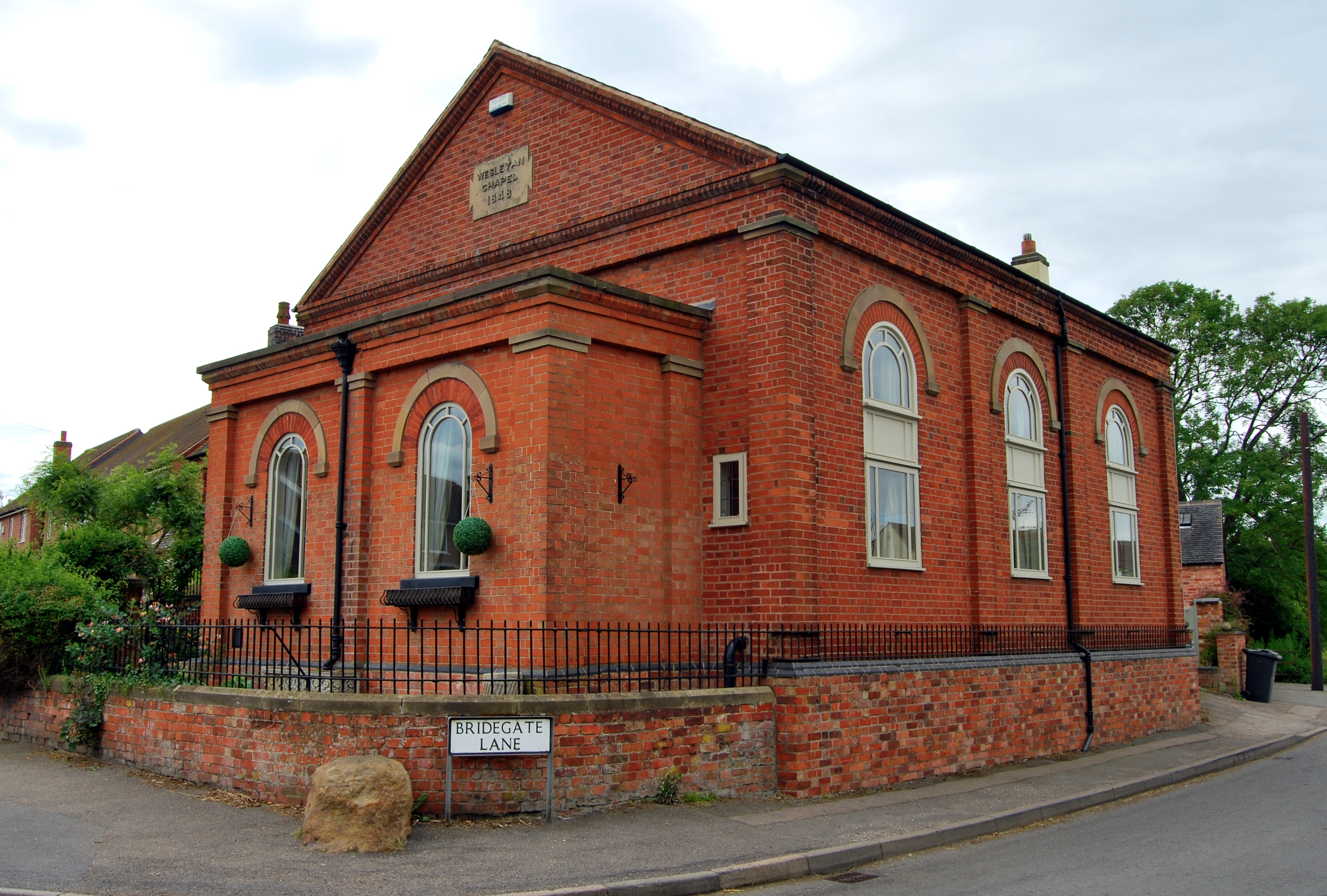
Former Methodist chapel

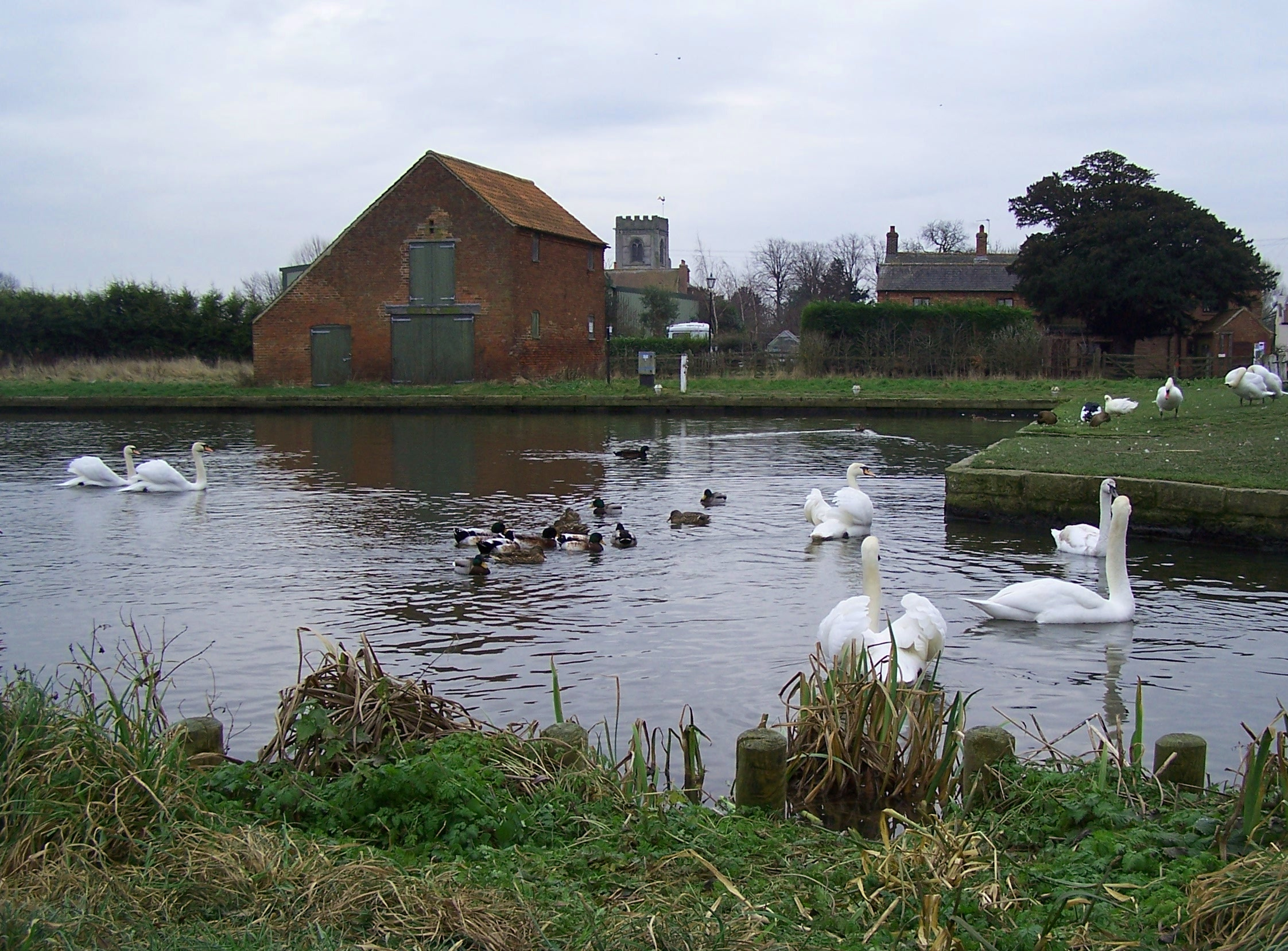
The basin at Hickling

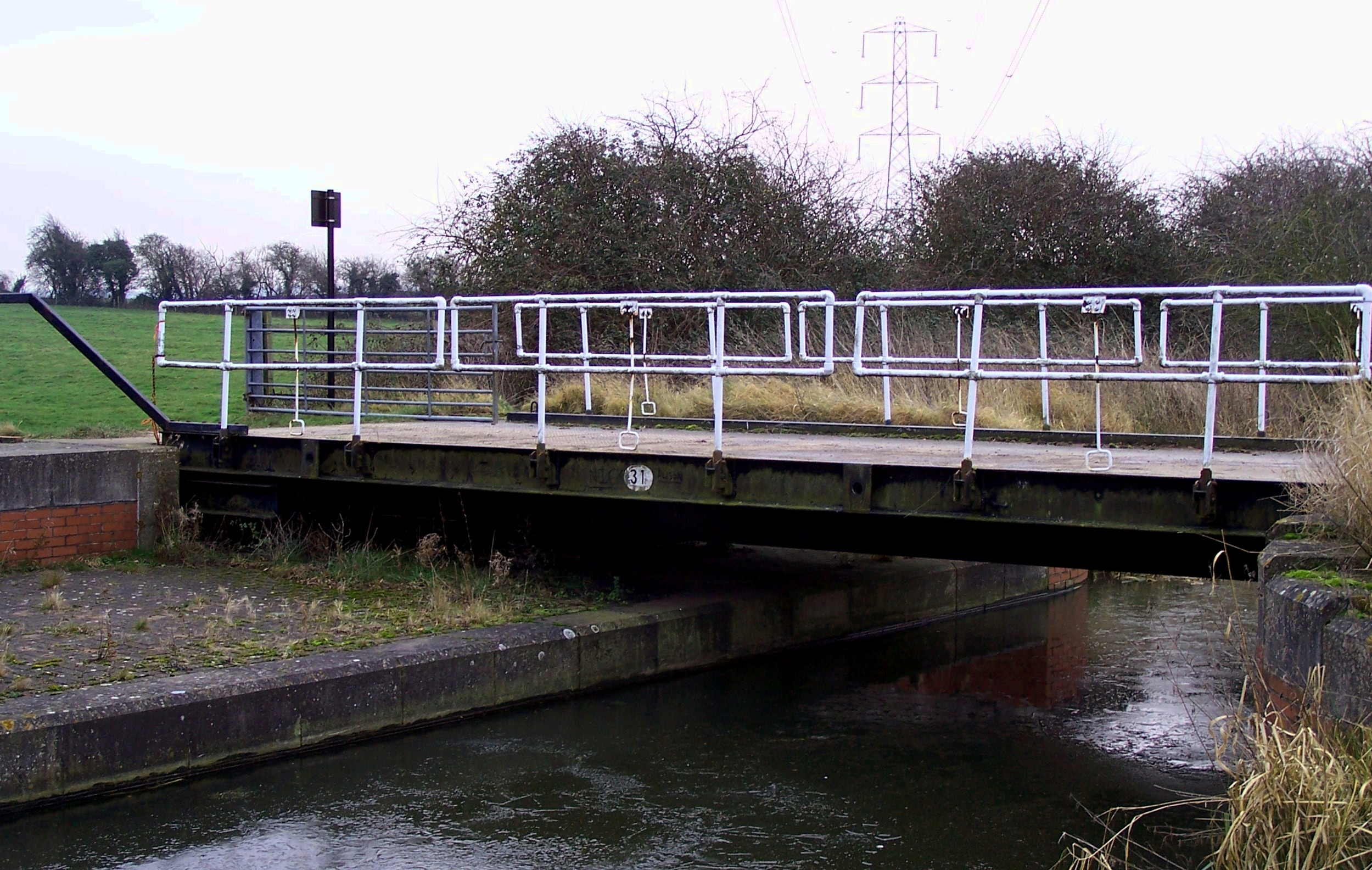
Swing bridge near Hickling
