= Harringworth railway station =

Former railway station in Northamptonshire, England

Coordinates: 52.5587°N 0.6560°W

Harringworth
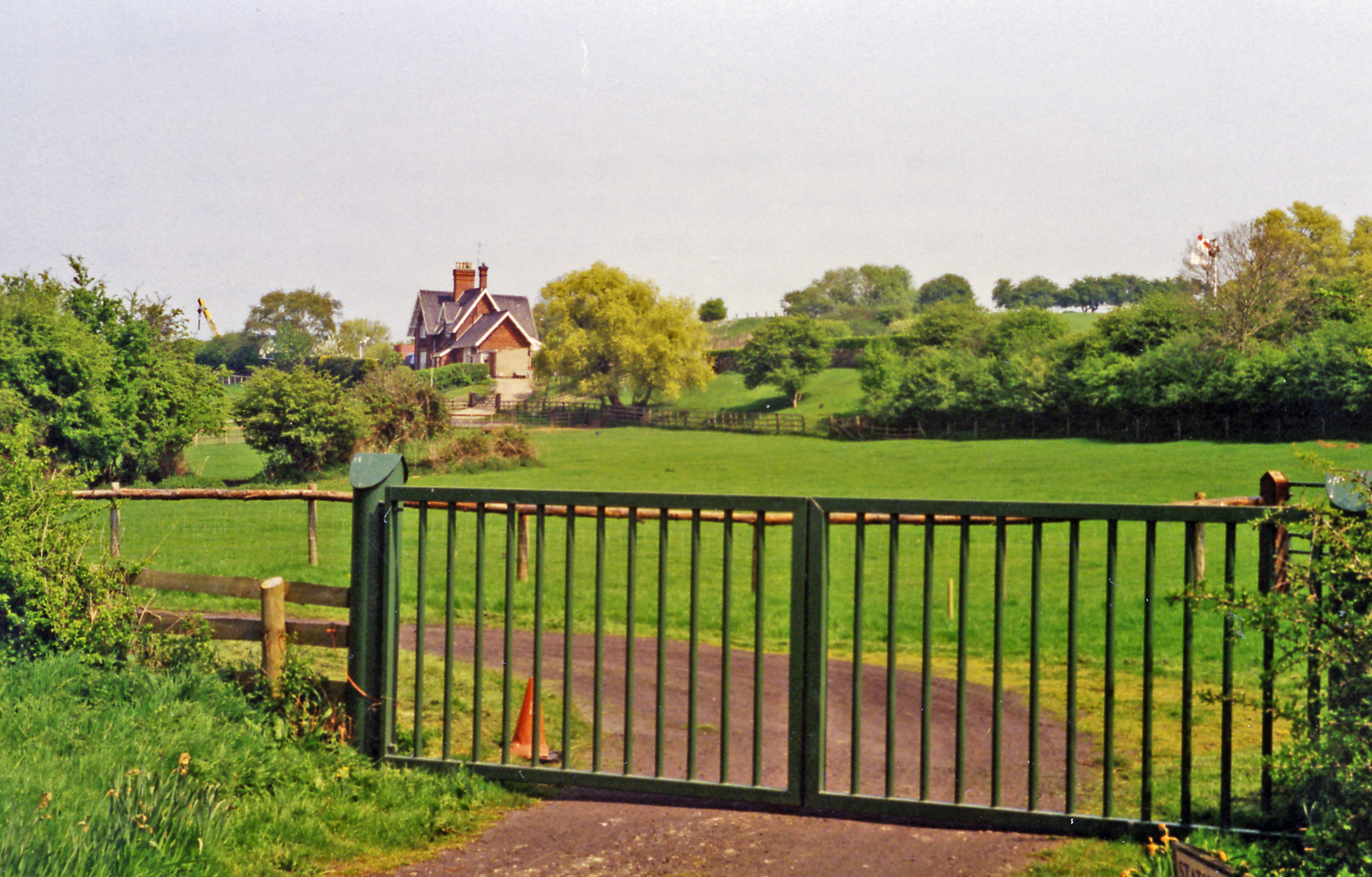
- View in 1995

General information
- Location: England
- Platforms: 2

Other information
- Status: Disused

History
- Pre-grouping: Midland Railway
- Post-grouping: London, Midland and Scottish Railway

Key dates
- 1 March 1880: Opened
- 1 November 1948: Closed
Location

Harringworth railway station was a railway station near Harringworth, Northamptonshire. It was on the Oakham to Kettering Line of the Midland Railway, at grid reference SP912965 at the south end of Welland Viaduct.

The former signal box which is a listed structure has been preserved by the Northampton & Lamport Railway and is currently stored at Pitsford and Brampton station.

February 2014: Station in private ownership - no access.

Services

Preceding station	Disused railways	Following station
Manton	Midland Railway	Gretton
