= Edwalton railway station =

Former railway station in Nottinghamshire, England

Edwalton

General information
- Location: Edwalton, Rushcliffe; England
- Coordinates: 52.9105°N 1.1189°W

Other information
- Status: Disused

History
- Original company: Midland Railway
- Pre-grouping: Midland Railway
- Post-grouping: London, Midland and Scottish Railway

Key dates
- 1 November 1879: Opened for goods
- 2 February 1880: Opened to passengers
- 28 July 1941: Closed to passengers
Location

Edwalton railway station served the village of Edwalton and the nearby town of West Bridgford in Nottinghamshire, England. It was opened on the Midland Railway Melton direct route between London and Nottingham, avoiding Leicester.

== History ==
The station was opened for goods on 1 November 1879, and to passengers on 2 February 1880 by the Midland Railway. The station was designed by the Midland Railway company architect John Holloway Sanders.

It was on the Nottingham direct line of the Midland Railway from Melton Mowbray to Nottingham, which had opened the previous year to allow the railway company's expresses between London and the North to avoid reversal at Nottingham. It also improved access to and from the iron-ore fields in Leicestershire and Rutland.

The list of station masters included:

- Thomas Robinson 1879 - 1881 (formerly station master at Harrow Road, Willesden, afterwards station master at Chorlton-cum-Hardy, then South Wingfield)
- George Butler 1881 - 1883
- Oliver John Haddock 1883 - 1888 (formerly station master at Church Road, Birmingham)
- William Henry Turner 1888 - 1890 (formerly station master at Bournville)
- Samuel Oughton 1890 - 1893 (afterwards station master at Widmerpool)
- Charles Bateman 1893 - 1903
- George William Allen 1904 - 1909 (afterwards station master at Saxby)
- Joseph Bartholomew 1908 - 1913 (formerly station master at Cross Hill and Codnor, afterwards station master at Nottingham Road, Derby)
- A. Glastonbury (later station master at Denby)
- Herbert Edward Wooster 1913 - 1921 (afterwards station master at Little Eaton and Coxbench)
- Frank Tunnicliffe 1921 - 1925
- Walter Toogood 1926 - 1934
- Thomas Bertram Pendleton 1936 - 1939 (afterwards station master at South Witham)

The station closed on 28 July 1941.

| Preceding station | Disused railways | Following station |
|---|---|---|
| Nottingham | Midland Railway; Nottingham direct line of the Midland Railway | Plumtree |

== Present day ==
Following the closure of the line as a through-route in 1968, the line between Melton Mowbray and Edwalton was converted for use as the Old Dalby Test Track. This was used initially for the Advanced Passenger Train project and, more recently, Class 390 Pendolino units. It was also used for testing London Underground 'S Stock' trains.

Edwalton itself was never part of the test track, the line stopping short at the A606 road bridge.

The site today has an up market housing development built upon it.
