= Official Handbook of Stations =

The Official Handbook of Stations was a large book (13 in × 8 in or 33 cm × 20 cm, 494 pages) listing all the passenger and goods stations, as well as private sidings, on the railways of Great Britain and Ireland. It was published in 1956 by the British Transport Commission (under the Railway Clearing House name) and provides an historical snapshot of the railways of the time.

Each station or depot was shown against its county, railway region (including its pre-grouping company), and parent station. If the station had a crane then its weight limit was also shown in tons & cwt.

== Classes of traffic ==
In six columns the classes of traffic handled at the station was shown as follows:

Column 1 - G = Goods Traffic

Column 1 - G* = Coal Class, Mineral and Station-to-Station Traffic in Truck Loads.

Column 2 - P = Passenger, Parcels & Miscellaneous Traffic.

Column 2 - P* = Passenger, but not Parcels & Miscellaneous Traffic.

Column 2 - P† = Parcels & Miscellaneous Traffic (i.e. not Passengers).

Column 3 - F = Furniture Vans, Carriages, Motor Cars, Portable Engines and Machines on Wheels.

Column 4 - L = Livestock

Column 5 - H = Horse Boxes and Prize Cattle Vans.

Column 6 - C = Carriages and Motor Cars by Passenger or Parcels Train.
