= Old Dalby Test Track =

English railway used for testing trains

Coordinates: 52°48′32″N 0°59′36″W

The Old Dalby Test Track is a railway in the United Kingdom which is used for testing new designs of trains and railway infrastructure. It runs between Melton Mowbray, Leicestershire and Edwalton, on the course of the Midland Railway's route between Kettering and Nottingham which closed to passengers on 1 May 1967, and to goods in 1968. It is 13 1/2 miles (21.7 km) in length.

Since its first use as a test track in May 1966, the Old Dalby Test Track has been involved in numerous projects, one early major initiative being British Rail Research Division's Advanced Passenger Train project. In addition to its use by trains, various elements of line-side infrastructure, such as overhead line (OHLE) and signaling equipment, have also been tested on the line. During July 1984, a destructive full-scale integrity test of a nuclear flask train was conducted, witnessed by a large crowd; most testing has been closed to the public and security measures are typically present around the line to deter intrusion. During the mid-1990s, as a result of British Rail's privatisation, ownership of the line was transferred to BRB (Residuary) Limited, while its historic main user, the Research Division, was abolished.

In the privatisation era, Old Dalby has been leased out to various companies, including Serco, Alstom, and Metronet to conduct testing. Alstom electrified the former Down line using 25 kV AC OHLE at a reported cost of £25 million, and reinstated a 6-mile (9.7 km) portion of the Up line, to support its activities. During the 2010s, there was public speculation that the test track could form part of a direct link between Nottingham and Melton Mowbray for the purpose of re-introducing a passenger service.

== History ==
The Old Dalby Test Track has its origins in the Beeching cuts, which saw the intentional rundown of the Midland Railway's main line, culminating in its closure to the majority of traffic during 1966. As early as May 1966, a portion of the infrastructure between Melton Mowbray and Edwalton began to be used for testing purposes by British Rail Research Division and thus was retained. Following the line's full closure as a through route in 1968, work was undertaken to convert this roughly 8-mile (13 km) section into a dedicated test track; during September 1970, with the modifications complete, it was re-opened and promptly put to use for the Research Division's Advanced Passenger Train APT-E project.

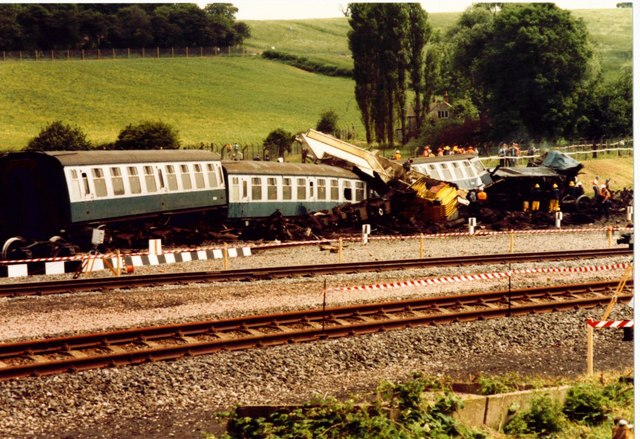
The aftermath of an intentional crash test of a nuclear flask train, 17 July 1984

The Old Dalby Test Track saw extensive use in the heyday of the Research Division, frequently being used for pantograph development and overhead line (OHLE) testing. Activity on the track was kept from the public and security measures were present against uninvited intrusions, neither journalists or enthusiasts were typically allowed to view the Research Division's activities outside of rare invitations. On 17 July 1984, the track was used to test the integrity of flasks used to transport nuclear fuel elements by rail. A Class 46 diesel locomotive (No. 46009), weighing 138 long tons (140 tonnes) and pulling three carriages, was intentionally crashed at about 100 miles per hour (160 km/h) into a pre-arranged, derailed, flask-carrying wagon. Witnessed by roughly 1,500 people, the behaviour of the flask was monitored in detail and the observations used to validate numerical modelling of flasks subjected to impact loading. A photographic record is available, as well as a video.

As a consequence of the privatisation of Britain's railways in the mid-1990s, the Old Dalby Test Track became the property of BRB (Residuary) Limited, a specially-created body established to own former BR assets that were not sold off or assigned to other entities. During the following two decades, the track was leased for a peppercorn rent to various companies, including Serco, Alstom, and Metronet (LUL). However, according to industry periodical Rail, testing activity at Old Dalby proceeded at a diminished rate compared with the British Rail era. Following the abolition of the BRBR, ownership of the track was transferred to the national railway infrastructure company Network Rail on 30 September 2013.

== Twenty-first century ==
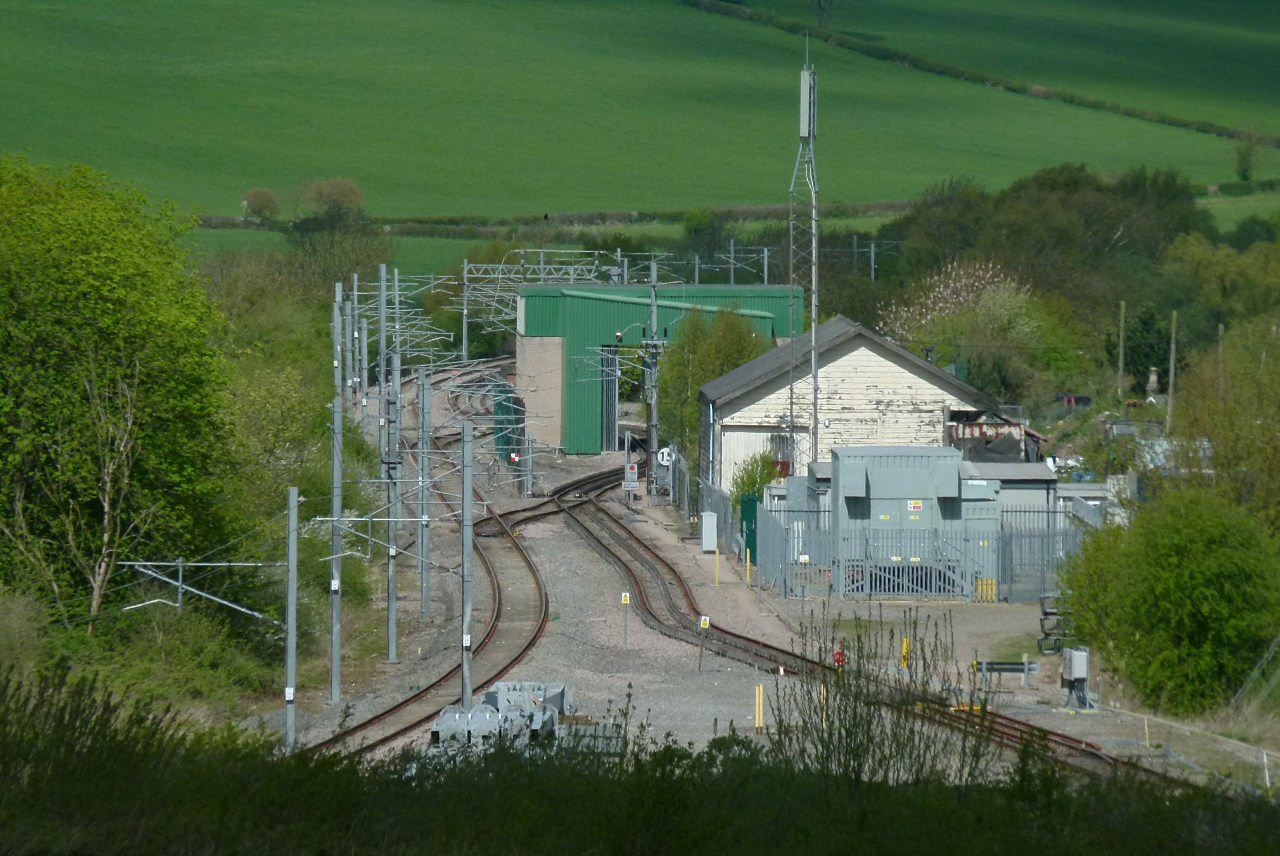
Old Dalby railway test centre

During 2001, the Old Dalby Test Track was leased to the rolling stock manufacturer Alstom Transport, which electrified the former Down line using 25 kV AC OHLE at a reported cost of £25 million. As configured, it was used to test and commission the Class 390 Pendolino trains that were later operated on the West Coast Main Line. It was on this track that the type first attained a recorded speed of 100 MPH. Alstom also re-instated 6 miles (9.7 km) of the former Up line from Old Dalby to the southern portal of Stanton Tunnel to test and commission the proposed European Rail Traffic Management System system for Network Rail.

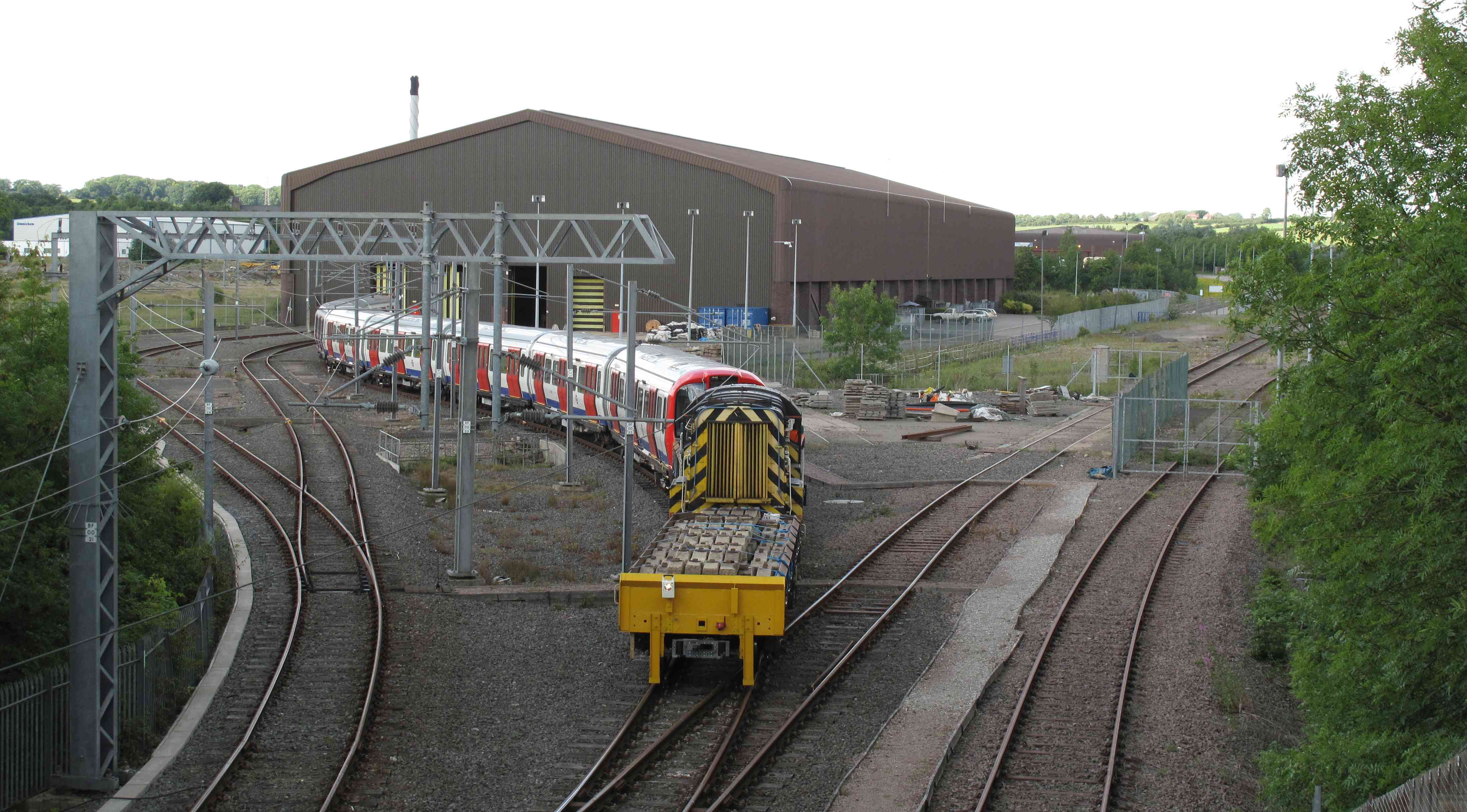
London Underground S stock being propelled into the Network Rail Asfordby Depot on the site of Asfordby Colliery, on the Old Dalby Test Track in 2009

When Alstom withdrew from the United Kingdom train-building market, the track was threatened with closure before being leased to Metronet in 2007 to test and commission London Underground S Stock trains being manufactured by Bombardier at Derby Litchurch Lane Works. The former Up line was equipped with approximately 4 km (2.5 mi) of London Underground-style conductor rails from Old Dalby (milepost 111) to a point near milepost 114. The former Down line retains its 25 kV OHLE. Testing of the 'S' stock at Old Dalby commenced in March 2009 and was still underway seven years later.

The public services group Serco was awarded the contract to manage the Old Dalby Test Track on behalf of Metronet, giving it the opportunity to attract other users. During April 2010, the track in use for the testing of Class 172 diesel multiple units, which were also manufactured by Bombardier in Derby.

Network Rail uses the track on an ongoing basis for calibration and testing of measurement and gauging trains; other testing includes the Technical Specification for Interoperability (TSI) high-speed noise compliance, electromagnetic compatibility, wheel slide protection, coupling compatibility, surge pressure in tunnels, low adhesion, and new technology trials and demonstrators. The organisation officially refers to Old Dalby as the Rail Innovation and Development Centre (Melton). During January 2014, Network Rail applied for changes to the original planning controls to increase train passes on the line substantially during weekdays, citing commissioning of the new Hitachi IEP stock based on the Javelin stock on High Speed 1 for the future electrification of the Great Western Main Line, these changes were presented as expanding the line's testing capabilities even further.

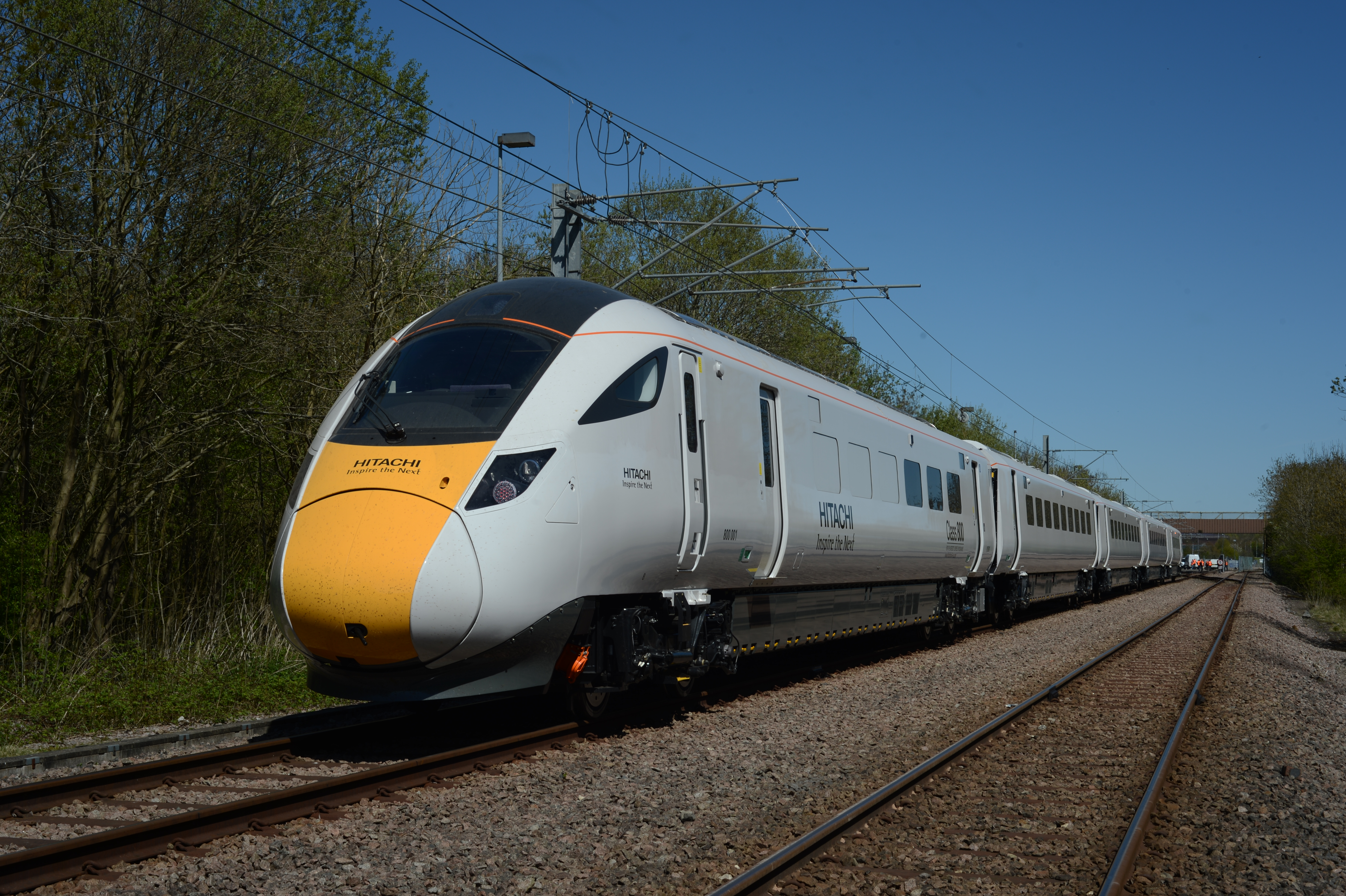
British Rail Class 800 undergoing dynamic testing at Old Dalby, 2015

In 2013, planned activities for Old Dalby included the testing of Thales' automatic train control system for London Underground, and new mainline infrastructure such as the Series One OCS system by Network Rail. During early 2015, testing of the first British Rail Class 800 high speed train took place at the track. Two years later, some high-speed testing for the IEP programme was still ongoing at the track; some of these tests involved the novel use of balloons to intentionally obstruct ventilation shafts inside Stanton Tunnel.

During summer 2017, an agreement was finalised for two railtours to be operated along the Old Dalby Test Track later that year; reportedly, spare paths on the test track are said to be scarce due to testing demands associated with the high volume of new rolling stock being acquired by various operators around this time. That same year, the local council suggested that the line could be reopened to passengers to allow a direct link between Nottingham and Melton Mowbray, as part of the Government's strategy to open up new areas for housing by recommissioning disused rail lines.

During March 2021, it was announced that GB Railfreight shall operate the Old Dalby test track on behalf of Network Rail for the following four years.
