= Midlands Express =

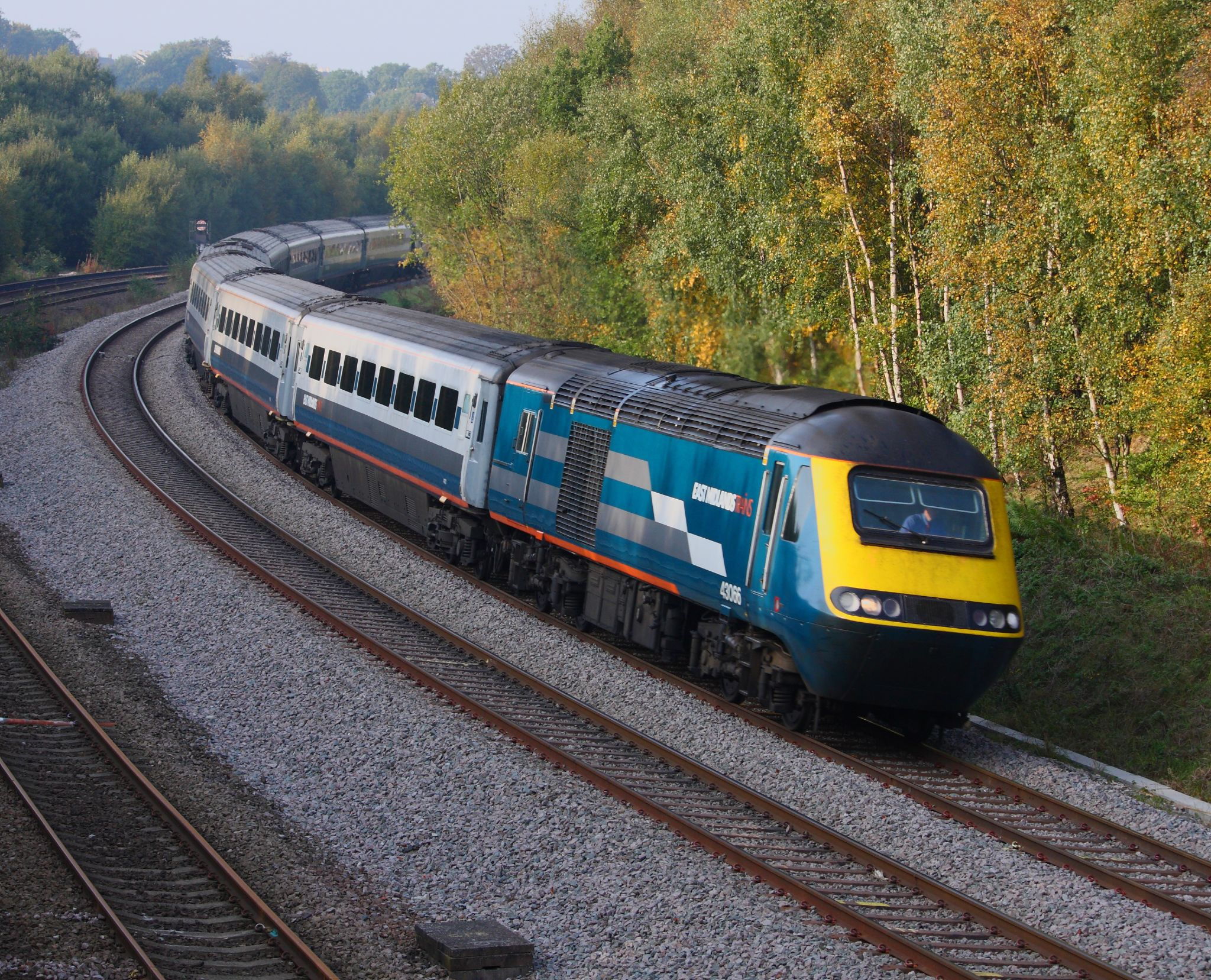
- East Midlands Trains branded InterCity 125 still in Midland Mainline livery at Clay Cross in October 2008

Overview
- Service type: Passenger train
- First service: 1999
- Last service: 12 December 2008
- Current operator(s): East Midlands Trains
- Former operator(s): Midland Mainline

Route
- Termini: London St Pancras; Sheffield
- Distance travelled: 165 miles (266 km)
- Service frequency: Daily
- Line(s) used: Midland Main Line

Technical
- Rolling stock: InterCity 125
- Operating speed: Up to 125 mph maximum

The Midlands Express was one of the three flagship named passenger trains operated by Midland Mainline and now East Midlands Trains. This train ran along the Midland Main Line and was operated using an InterCity 125.

== History ==
The Midlands Express name was introduced in 1999 and withdrawn from use by East Midlands Trains for the start of the December 2008 timetable. The last day the Midlands Express ran was 12 December 2008.

== Stations Served ==
The north-bound Midlands Express was the 1625 train from London St Pancras to Sheffield and called at:

- London St Pancras
- Kettering
- Leicester
- Loughborough
- Derby
- Chesterfield
- Sheffield

The south-bound Midlands Express was the 0705 train from Sheffield to London St Pancras and called at:

- Sheffield
- Chesterfield
- Derby
- Leicester
- London St Pancras

== Other named trains ==
Midland Mainline/East Midlands operated two other named trains at the time called:

- The Master Cutler
- The Robin Hood

East Midlands Railway still run services with these names after the franchise was handed over from East Midlands Trains.

== See also ==
- Midland Mainline
- East Midlands Trains
- InterCity 125
