= Bombardier Voyager =

Diesel-electric multiple unit

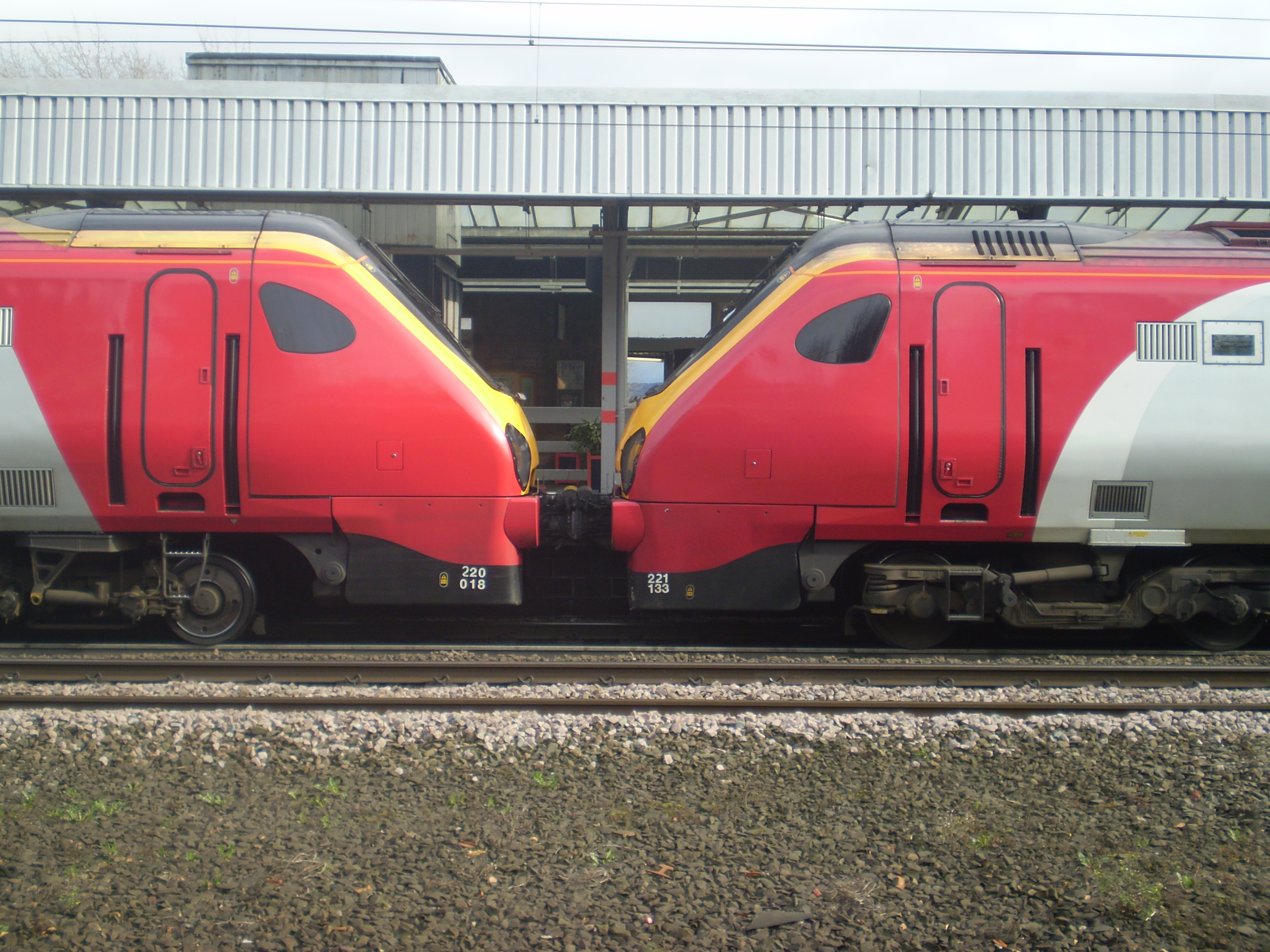
- Classes 220 (left) and 221 (right) at Durham, showing different bogie designs

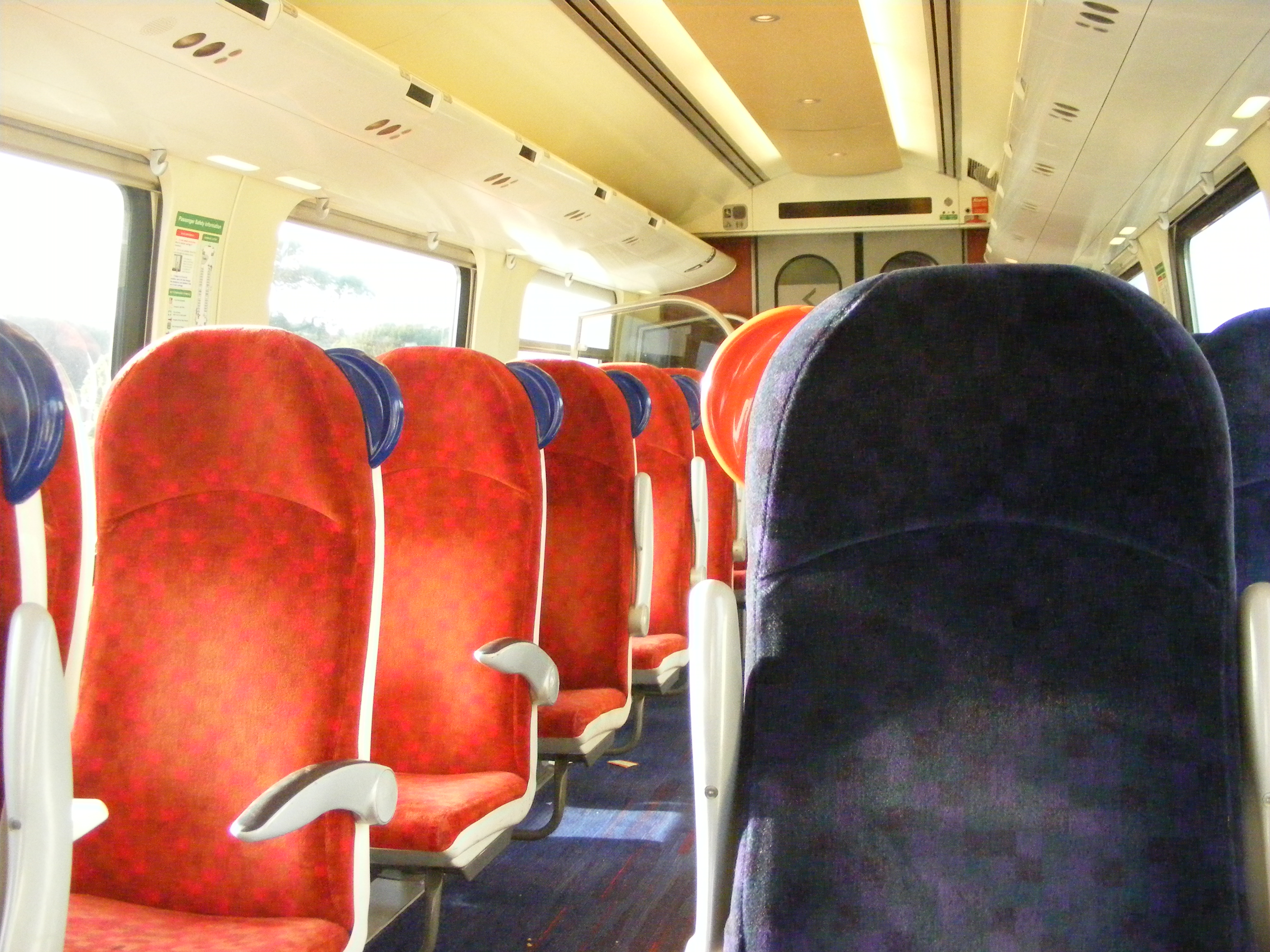
- The interior of standard class on board a Class 220 operated by CrossCountry
- In service: 2001–present
- Manufacturer: Bombardier Transportation
- Built at: Bruges, Belgium and Horbury railway works, Wakefield
- Constructed: 2000–2005
- Number built: 105 sets
- Owners: Classes 220 & 221: Rock Rail; Class 222: Eversholt Rail Group
- Operators: CrossCountry; East Midlands Railway; Grand Central; Lumo

Specifications
- Car body construction: Steel
- Car length: 23.85 m (78 ft 3 in) end cars 22.82 m (74 ft 10 in) other
- Width: 2.73 m (8 ft 11 in)
- Maximum speed: 125 mph (200 km/h)
- Prime mover: Cummins QSK19 19-litre 6-cylinder turbo-Diesel
- Power output: 750 hp (560 kW) per car
- Braking systems: Rheostatic and electro-pneumatic
- Safety systems: AWS, TPWS
- Coupling system: Dellner 12
- Track gauge: 1,435 mm (4 ft 8 1/2 in) standard gauge

The Bombardier Voyager is a family of high-speed 125 mph (200 km/h) diesel-electric multiple units built in Belgium by Bombardier Transportation, for service on the railway network of the United Kingdom. Construction of the Voyager family took place between 2000 and 2005, consisting of three classes - the Class 220 Voyager (currently operated by CrossCountry), the Class 221 Super Voyager (currently operated by CrossCountry and Grand Central) and the Class 222 Meridian (currently operated by East Midlands Railway and Lumo).

== Variants ==
=== Class 220 ===
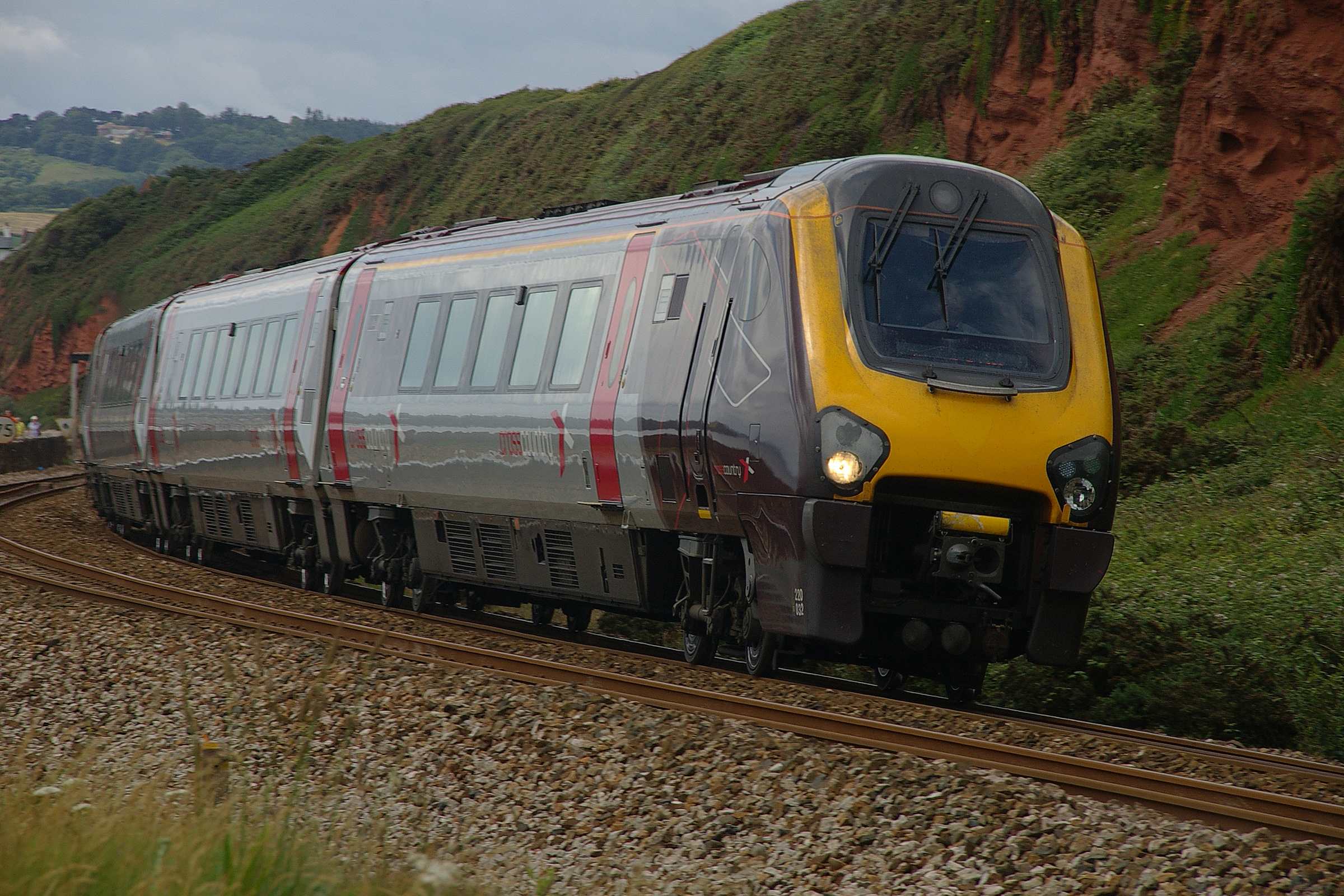
A Class 220 in CrossCountry livery

The Class 220 Voyager DEMUs were built to operate Cross Country intercity services. Virgin CrossCountry received 34 four-car sets in 2000/01. All passed with the CrossCountry franchise to Arriva CrossCountry in November 2007.

=== Class 221 ===
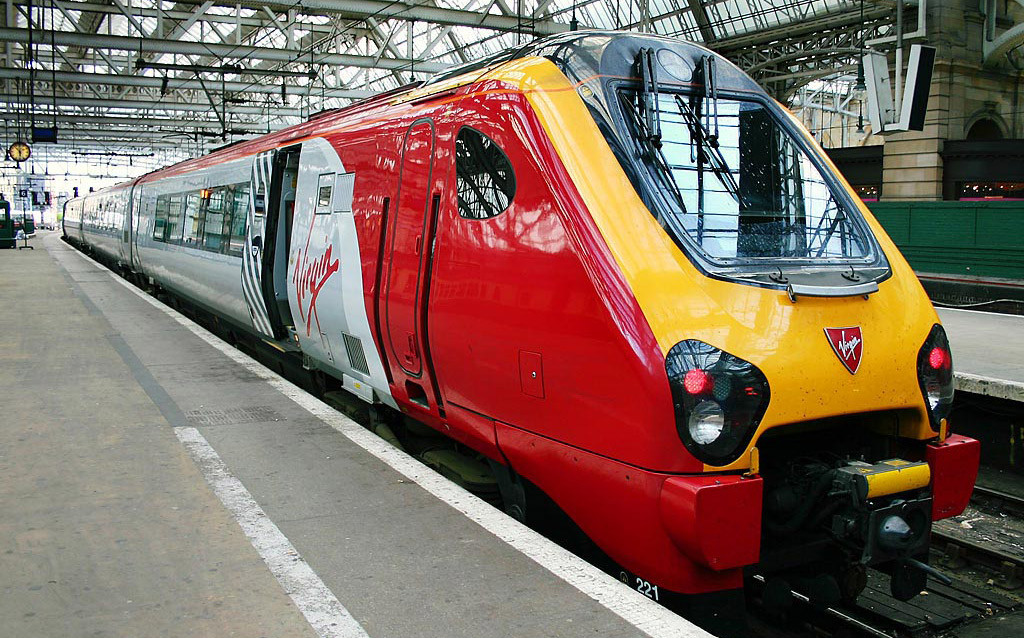
Class 221 Super Voyager in Virgin Trains livery

The Class 221 Super Voyager DEMUs were built as a tilting version of the Class 220. Although visually similar, they were fitted with a tilting mechanism and heavier bogies. Virgin CrossCountry received 40 five-car and 4 four-car sets. All passed with the CrossCountry franchise to Arriva CrossCountry in November 2007.

With the removal of West Coast Main Line services from the CrossCountry franchise in December 2007, 16 were transferred to Virgin Trains West Coast for use on InterCity West Coast services. A further five moved from CrossCountry to Virgin Trains West Coast in December 2008. CrossCountry removed the tilting equipment from its Class 221s to improve reliability and lower the cost of maintenance.

On 8 December 2019, all of the West Coast sets passed to Avanti West Coast, the new operator of the West Coast Partnership franchise.

Avanti West Coast sent two of their Class 221 Super Voyagers off lease in 2022.

In 2023, Grand Central leased the above two sets to operate services between London Kings Cross and Bradford, with the first of these two units entering service in later that year.

=== Class 222 ===
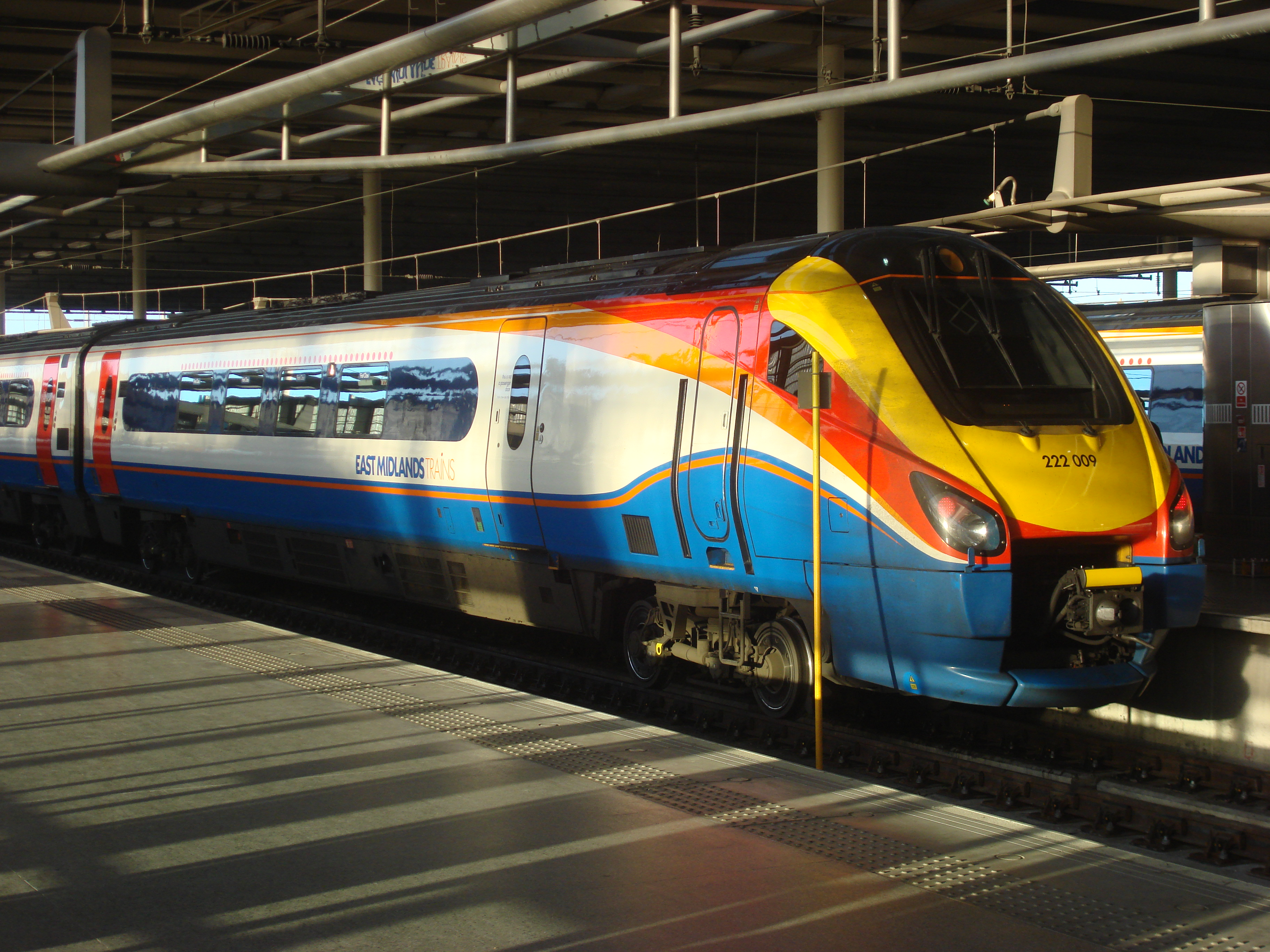
Class 222 Meridian in East Midlands Trains livery

The Class 222 Meridian DEMUs are broadly similar to the original Voyager units, but feature a number of reliability improvements and different internal layout.

The Class 222 was built in the light of experience gained with the 220 and 221 units; in particular, many more components were installed under the floor so as to increase space for passengers. Twenty-seven sets were built:

- Midland Mainline ordered 23 Meridian units to replace 17 Class 170 Turbostar units and provide stock for a later cancelled London St Pancras to Leeds service. Originally configured as 16 four-car and seven nine-car sets, they were later re-formed into a combination of four, five and eight-car units. All were transferred to the new franchise holder East Midlands Trains (EMT) in November 2007. When EMT took over the franchise, it removed a car from six of its eight-car sets, to lengthen previously four-car units. The last remaining eight-car unit was reduced to five cars. All passed with the franchise to East Midlands Railway in 2019.
- Hull Trains obtained 4 four-car Class 222/1 Pioneers in 2005 to replace four Class 170 Turbostar. These units are slightly different internally from the 222/0 Meridian trains. Following a maintenance incident and the long-term unavailability of one unit, First Hull Trains replaced its Class 222 fleet with a fleet of Class 180 Adelantes in 2009. The Class 222s were transferred to EMT for use with the rest of the Class 222 fleet.

== Bombardier Voyager variants ==
Class	Image	Operator	Type	Number	Carriages	Built
Class 220		CrossCountry	DEMU	34	4	2000–2001
Class 221		CrossCountry	DEMU	4	4	2001–2002
Class 221		CrossCountry	DEMU	32	5	2001–2002
Class 221	Avanti Voyager departing Rugby 11.21	Stored	DEMU	6	5	2001–2002
Class 221		Grand Central	DEMU	2	5	2001–2002
Class 222		East Midlands Railway	DEMU	23	5	2003–2005
Class 222		East Midlands Railway	DEMU	4	7	2003–2005

=== Future ===
Avanti West Coast's Class 221 units were replaced by the Class 805 and Class 807, whilst all of East Midlands Railway's Class 222 units are scheduled to be replaced by the Class 810.

In 2025, Lumo announced it would lease five Class 222 units for its new Stirling to London route.

On 19 March 2026, ScotRail announced it would lease 22 five-car Class 222 units to replace its current Inter7City fleet. The first train is scheduled to enter service in late 2027.

== Accidents and incidents ==
- In 2006, a Class 222 unit had to be taken out of service due to a door opening in Northamptonshire on a London-Sheffield service, while the train was at speed.
- On 26 May 2006, a passenger was murdered on board Voyager unit 220005 as the train pulled into Oxenholme whilst working the Glasgow to Paignton service.
- On 14 March 2008, a fire broke out on a Voyager at Banbury. About 100 passengers were evacuated from the train.
- On 20 April 2012, a Class 222 unit caught fire at Nottingham. The fire was caused by a buildup of grime which was heated by the movement of the train's wheels.
- On 18 July 2018, a Voyager unit caught fire shortly after leaving Derby whilst operating a service to Glasgow Central. All 175 passengers were evacuated.
- On 26 September 2019, an electrical explosion occurred in a vestibule on Voyager unit 221132 (coach 60982), while the train was being moved between the Central Rivers depot and Birmingham New Street. There were no passengers on board at the time, and the incident was discovered when the driver changed ends.

== Proposed conversion to electrical operation ==
In 2010 Bombardier proposed the conversion of several Voyager multiple units into hybrid electric and diesel vehicles capable of taking power from an overhead pantograph (electro-diesels EDMUs). The proposal was named Project Thor.

In October 2010 it was speculated that 21 additional pantograph vehicles would be manufactured at Derby Litchurch Lane Works, and 21 sets converted, at a cost of approximately £300million, however in 2011 the plant did not have the facilities to manufacture steel carriages, though it was expected that much of the work would take place in the UK, and provide work for the Derby plant. In December 2011 a proposal to electrify 30-35 sets for the CrossCountry franchise, referred to as "eVoyager", was considered by the Department for Transport.
