= South Yorkshireman =

The South Yorkshireman was a British named passenger train. In its modern version it was one of four named expresses operated by East Midlands Railway, and runs between Sheffield and London St Pancras.

The original South Yorkshireman was a train in the post-WW2 era from Bradford via Sheffield Victoria to London Marylebone over the Great Central Main Line.

== 1940s, 1950s ==
The South Yorkshireman was started by British Railways in May 1948. It left Bradford Exchange daily at 10:00, returning from London at 16:50, and calling at Huddersfield, Sheffield, and Leicester; in some years at least, also at Halifax, Brighouse, Penistone, Nottingham, Rugby and Aylesbury. It was not a particularly fast service even by the standards of that era, the down train taking 5 hours 30 minutes to get from London to Bradford. It usually had nine coaches including a restaurant car, and was often hauled by a Gresley A3 Pacific. The train continued running until 1960, when all long-distance expresses on the former Great Central route were withdrawn.

== Present day ==
The South Yorkshireman was reintroduced on 15 December 2008. The service was named as part of an East Midlands Trains competition to name two new crack express trains.

The southbound South Yorkshireman was the 07:46 departure from Sheffield to London St Pancras. The northbound service left St Pancras at 17:55 for Sheffield.

The service was provided by an 7-car Class 222 Meridian

The up (southbound) train in 2010 has an end-to-end journey time of 2 hours 24 minutes. The down (northbound) train took 2 hours 9 minutes.

The service lost its name when a new timetable was introduced on 14 December 2025.

== Stations served ==
The South Yorkshireman previously called at (southbound):

- Sheffield
- Chesterfield
- Derby
- Long Eaton
- East Midlands Parkway
- Loughborough
- Leicester
- London St Pancras

The South Yorkshireman previously called at (northbound):

- London St Pancras
- Leicester
- Derby
- Chesterfield
- Sheffield

== Other named trains ==
East Midlands Railway operated three other named trains called:

- Master Cutler
- Robin Hood
- Sheffield Continental

== See also ==
- East Midlands Trains
- British Rail Class 222
- List of named passenger trains of the United Kingdom
