= East Midlands franchise =

The East Midlands franchise is a franchise in Great Britain operated by the following train operating companies:

- East Midlands Trains, from November 2007 until August 2019
- East Midlands Railway, since August 2019
