= Robin Hood (train) =

Overview
- Service type: Passenger train
- First service: 2 February 1959
- Last service: 12 December 2025
- Former operators: East Midlands Railway; Midland Mainline, InterCity

Route
- Termini: London St Pancras; Nottingham
- Distance travelled: 126.5 miles
- Average journey time: 1 hour 31 minutes (southbound), 1 hour 40 minutes (northbound)
- Service frequency: Daily
- Train numbers: 1B18 (southbound); 1D52 (northbound)
- Line used: Midland Main Line

Technical
- Rolling stock: British Rail Class 222
- Operating speed: Up to 125 mph maximum

The Robin Hood was one of the four flagship named passenger trains operated by East Midlands Railway, inherited from Midland Mainline, in England.

== History ==
The first use of the Robin Hood name was on 2 February 1959 when British Railways gave the name to the 0815 from Nottingham to London. Unusually, this avoided Leicester and stopped only at Manton. In the reverse direction, however, it also stopped at Bedford, Wellingborough and Kettering.

The train lost its name at the end of the summer 1962 timetable.

Prior to the timetable change on 14 December 2008, the Robin Hood was operated by a 7-car Class 222 Meridian on both the outward and return trip.

As of 2016, there were two trains named Robin Hood:

- the 0755 service from Nottingham to London St Pancras, arriving at 0926 on weekday mornings. It was operated by a 7-car Class 222 Meridian at an average speed of 83.36 miles per hour (134.15 km/h)
- the 1615 service from London St Pancras to Nottingham arriving at 1755 on weekday evenings. It was operated by a InterCity 125 HST at an average speed of 75.86 miles per hour (122.08 km/h).

As of 2019, the two trains named the Robin Hood were rescheduled to run as:

- the 0800 service from Nottingham to London St Pancras arriving at 0938 on weekday mornings. It was operated by a 7-car Class 222 Meridian at an average speed of 77.16 miles per hour (124.18 km/h).
- the 1634 service from London St Pancras to Nottingham arriving at 1819 on weekday evenings. It was operated by an InterCity 125 HST at an average speed of 72 miles per hour (116 km/h).

As of 2024, the two trains named the Robin Hood were running as:

- the 0640 train from Lincoln to London St Pancras arriving at 0927 on weekday mornings. It is operated by a 10-car Class 222 Meridian.
- the 1735 train from London St Pancras to Nottingham arriving at 1913 on weekday evenings. It is operated by a 10-car Class 222 Meridian.

Neither service ran at weekends.

The service lost its name when a new timetable was introduced on 14 December 2025.

== Other named trains ==
East Midlands Railway operated three other named trains called:

- Master Cutler
- South Yorkshireman
- Sheffield Continental.
