= Midland Mainline (train operating company) =

British train operating company

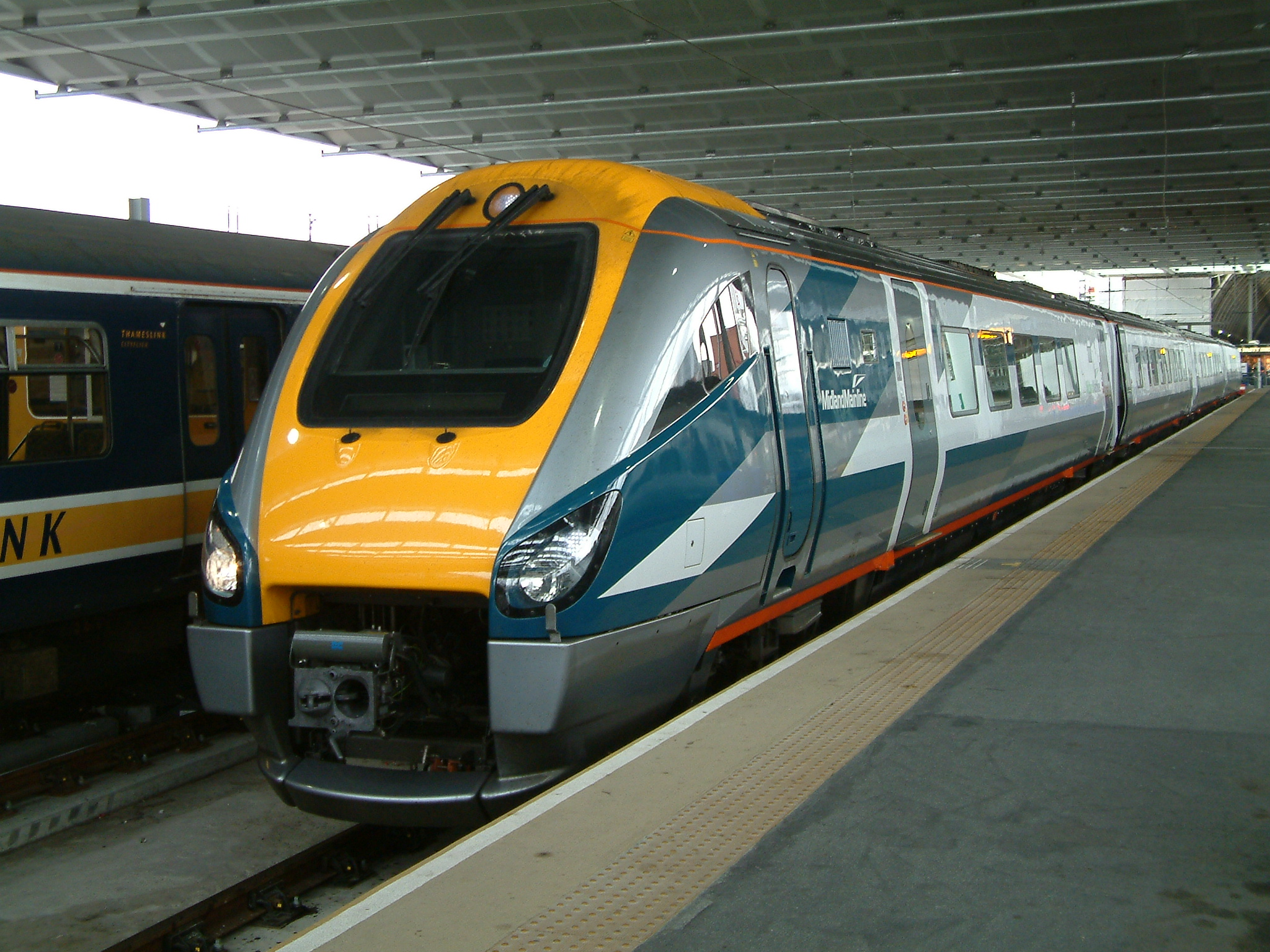
- Class 222 Meridian at London St Pancras in 2004

Overview
- Franchises: Midland Main Line; 28 April 1996 – 10 November 2007
- Main regions: East Midlands; Yorkshire and the Humber; Greater London
- Other region: East of England
- Fleet: 23 Class 222 Meridian sets 28 HST power cars
- Stations called at: 27 (7 operated)
- Parent company: National Express
- Reporting mark: ML
- Predecessor: InterCity
- Successor: East Midlands Trains

Other
- Website: www.midlandmainline.com

Midland Mainline was a British train operating company that operated the Midland Main Line franchise between April 1996 and November 2007. It was owned by the British transport company National Express.

Midland Mainline took over operations of the franchise from the state-owned operator InterCity in April 1996. Originally intended to run for ten years, a two-year extension was awarded in exchange for greater investment into new rolling stock and the provision of an hourly service to Leeds. To facilitate the Project Rio services, 23 HST power cars and associated Mark 3 carriages were transferred from Virgin CrossCountry to Midland Mainline. During February 2002, Midland Mainline ordered 16 four-carriage and 7 nine-carriage Class 222 Meridian trains, the first of which entered service in May 2004. These new trainsets allowed for several HSTs to be released to other operators, such as First Great Western and Great North Eastern Railway (GNER).

Midland Mainline ran fast and semi-fast passenger services from London to the East Midlands and Yorkshire, on the Midland Main Line. Most services ran between London St Pancras and either Derby, Nottingham or Sheffield. Some services extended to Burton upon Trent, Matlock, Barnsley, Leeds, York and Scarborough. Midland Mainline operated at 27 stations, of which it managed eight. In June 2007, the Department for Transport awarded the franchise to rival company Stagecoach; accordingly, the services operated by Midland Mainline were transferred to East Midlands Trains on 11 November 2007.

== History ==
The Midland Mainline franchise was awarded by the Director of Passenger Rail Franchising to Midland Main Line Limited for a period of ten years with operations commencing on 28 April 1996. Shortly after the franchise commenced, the transport conglomerate National Express launched a bid to acquire Midland Main Line Limited, and thereby the franchise. The tentative acquisition was promptly referred to the Monopolies and Mergers Commission for review as National Express not only operated an existing rail franchise but also numerous express coach services in the West Midlands. The Commission found that the deal would likely be against the public interest, leading to the Board of Trade deciding that National Express ought to commit to certain requirements in respect to coast fares and service levels. National Express consented to several restrictions, including to maintain the service levels of its coach services, to not increase fares above the increase in the Retail Price Index, and to provide verifying information to regulatory authorities so that its level of compliance to this undertakings can be ascertained.

During May 1999, Midland Mainline was able to extend its sphere of operation following the delivery of additional rolling stock. In August 2000, the Shadow Strategic Rail Authority awarded a two-year extension in return for National Express committing itself to certain investments in the franchise, which included the ordering of new rolling stock and the running of an hourly service to Leeds.

== Service patterns ==
The off peak service pattern, upon conclusion of the franchise in November 2007, consisted of four departures per hour from London St Pancras. There were two fast and two semi-fast trains per hour. All Midland Mainline services (except The Master Cutler morning up service) called at Leicester with the fastest journey time to and from London of one hour and nine minutes. The services between London, Luton and Bedford supplemented the high frequency Thameslink and later First Capital Connect commuter service.

=== Limited services ===
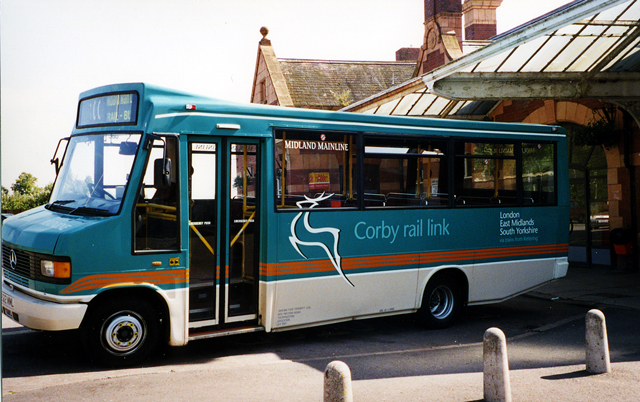
Midland Mainline rail bus link ran between Corby town centre and Kettering railway station.

Midland Mainline operated a limited service between St Pancras and Leeds, with three early morning departures from Leeds and four evening return trips from St Pancras. This was principally because Midland Mainline's HSTs were maintained at Neville Hill depot. The timings did not compare favourably with the principal service from London King's Cross to Leeds along the East Coast Main Line with the Midland Main Line having a much slower line speed. The journey time on the Midland route was around three hours and 15 minutes vs two hours and 15 minutes via the East Coast.

In July 1996, a bus service between Kettering and Corby was introduced.

From May 1999, a small number of through trains from St Pancras to Burton upon Trent and Barnsley were introduced as well as stops at Belper and Meadowhall.

From May 2000, through trains between St Pancras and Matlock were introduced, ceasing in December 2004 when Class 222s were introduced, as they were not allowed on the Derwent Valley Line branch line. That same month, Midland Mainline also began operating one Saturday service between St Pancras and York via Doncaster; in summer, it would continue to Scarborough. On Sunday, a service to York started at Leicester, with the return service being via the Erewash Valley Line to Nottingham, where it reversed before proceeding to St Pancras.

A small number of trains operated between St Pancras and Sheffield via Nottingham and along the Erewash Valley Line to Chesterfield serving Langley Mill and Alfreton.

== Project Rio ==
From May 2003 until September 2004, Midland Mainline operated an hourly service between St Pancras and Manchester Piccadilly; this was at the request of the Strategic Rail Authority whilst the West Coast Main Line between London Euston and Manchester underwent engineering work using former Virgin CrossCountry High Speed Trains. This temporary service was named Project Rio after the similarity of the route to footballer Rio Ferdinand's recent transfer movements. He first transferred from West Ham United to Leeds United, then later crossed the Pennines in a £30 million record transfer to Manchester United.

The service used the Midland Main Line as far as Trent Junction, before taking the Erewash Valley Line (avoiding Derby) to Clay Cross, rejoining the Midland Main Line until Dore South Junction, using Dore Tunnel Curve to join the Hope Valley Line westwards towards Manchester Piccadilly. South of Leicester, the service ran in the path of the xx:30 semi-fast Nottingham train, with an additional Leicester to Nottingham service introduced using the displaced Class 170 Turbostar.

== Named trains ==
- The Robin Hood on the 06:30 Sheffield to St Pancras via Nottingham, and returning as the 17:00 St Pancras to Nottingham.
- The Master Cutler on the 06:14 Leeds to St Pancras which runs non stop from Chesterfield, and 16:55 St Pancras to Leeds return.
- The Midlands Express on the 07:05 Sheffield to St Pancras.

== Rolling stock ==
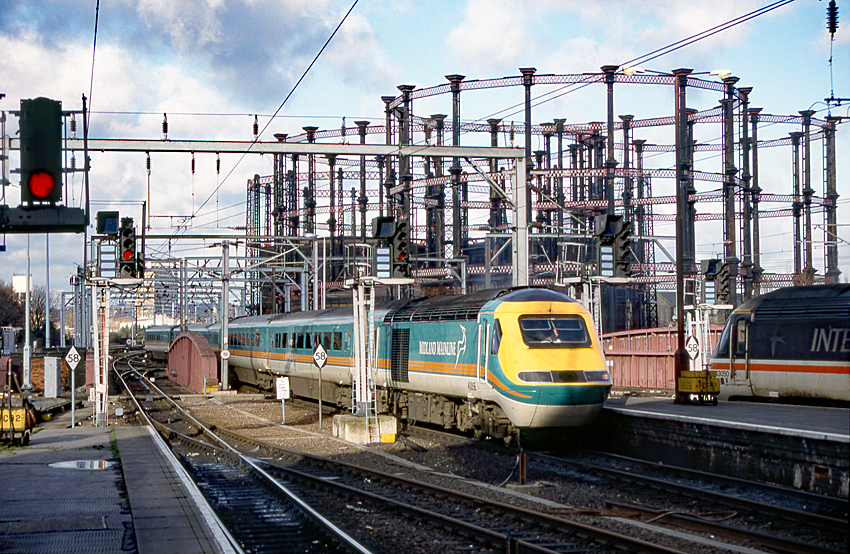
43056 at St Pancras

Midland Mainline inherited a fleet of High Speed Trains from British Rail. Enhancements were carried out to the power cars of the HSTs, most notably a revised lighting cluster.

In April 1997, Midland Mainline ordered 13 (later expanded to 17) Class 170 Turbostars to operate stopping services. Originally, all were ordered as two-carriage sets before it was decided to increase 10 to three-carriage sets. During May 1999, the first Class 170 entered service with the operator; the type's arrival permitted a new timetable with increased frequencies to be introduced, in which the Class 170s operated the majority of the stops south of Leicester, allowing the HSTs to be better used on the longer-distance services.

To cover for a shortage of HSTs, Midland Mainline hired two Fragonset Class 47 locomotives to top and tail a set of HSBC Rail Mark 2 carriages on a morning service from Nottingham to London St Pancras and evening return to Sheffield from February 2002. In October 2002, Midland Mainline was able to replace these, after leasing an additional five HST power cars and two sets of Mark 3 carriages that had been released by Virgin CrossCountry.

During February 2002, Midland Mainline ordered sixteen four-carriage and seven nine-carriage Class 222 Meridian trains based on Virgin CrossCountry's Class 220 Voyager, but with developments to improve passenger comfort and address some of the criticisms aimed at the Voyager. The first of these sets entered service in May 2004. The four-carriage sets replaced the Class 170s, which were transferred to Central Trains, while the nine-carriage sets were ordered to operate a new service from London St Pancras to Leeds via Nottingham and the Erewash Valley Line. When the Strategic Rail Authority ruled that there was not enough demand for this service, the nine-carriage sets were left sitting idle until eventually they were put into use on the services between Nottingham/Sheffield and London St Pancras from July 2005, releasing one HST for hire to First Great Western while it refurbished its fleet and two other HSTs to Great North Eastern Railway (GNER) to allow that operator to run extra services to Leeds from May 2007.

As the nine-carriage Meridians were lightly loaded while the four-carriage sets were overcrowded, it was decided in 2006 to reduce all of the nine-carriage sets to eight carriages, the removed carriages then being used to extend seven of the four-carriage sets to five carriages. A further reconfiguration of the Meridians took place in 2008, shortly after East Midlands Trains took over Midland Mainline's services, when six of the eight-carriage sets were reduced to seven carriages and the remaining set was reduced to five carriages, allowing all nine of the remaining four-carriage sets to be extended to five carriages.

To operate the Project Rio services to Manchester Piccadilly, 23 HST power cars and associated Mark 3 carriages were transferred from Virgin CrossCountry in May 2003. Whilst these were undergoing overhaul, a First Great Western HST was hired from May 2003 until February 2004. When Project Rio concluded in September 2004, some sets were transferred to First Great Western and GNER, while others went into storage.

Midland Mainline's fleet consisted of the following trains at the time they ceased operating:

=== Final fleet ===
Class	Image	Type	Top speed		Quantity	Routes operated	Built
Class	Image	Type	mph	km/h	Quantity	Routes operated	Built
Class 43		Diesel locomotive	125	200	31	Midland Main Line	1976–1982
Class 222 Meridian		Diesel multiple unit	125	200	23	Midland Main Line	2003–2005
Mark 3 carriage		Passenger carriage	125	200		Midland Main Line	1975–1982

=== Previous fleet ===
Class	Image	Type	Top speed		Quantity	Routes operated	Built	Left fleet
Class	Image	Type	mph	km/h	Quantity	Routes operated	Built	Left fleet
Class 170 Turbostar		Diesel multiple unit	100	160	17	Midland Main Line	1999	2004

== Stations ==
Midland Mainline operated at twenty-seven stations, of which it managed eight: London St Pancras, Wellingborough, Kettering, Market Harborough, Leicester, Derby, Chesterfield and Sheffield.

Other stations served included: Luton Airport Parkway, Luton, Bedford Midland, Loughborough, Long Eaton, Willington, Burton upon Trent, Beeston, Nottingham, Langley Mill, Alfreton, Dronfield, Meadowhall, Barnsley, Doncaster, Wakefield Westgate, Leeds, York, Scarborough.

Stations which used to be served but then had their Midland Mainline services stop before the franchise ended: Duffield, Ambergate, Whatstandwell, Cromford, Matlock Bath, Matlock, Stockport, Manchester Piccadilly.

== Depot ==
Midland Mainline's HSTs were maintained at Neville Hill with the rest of the fleet at Derby Etches Park.

== Demise ==
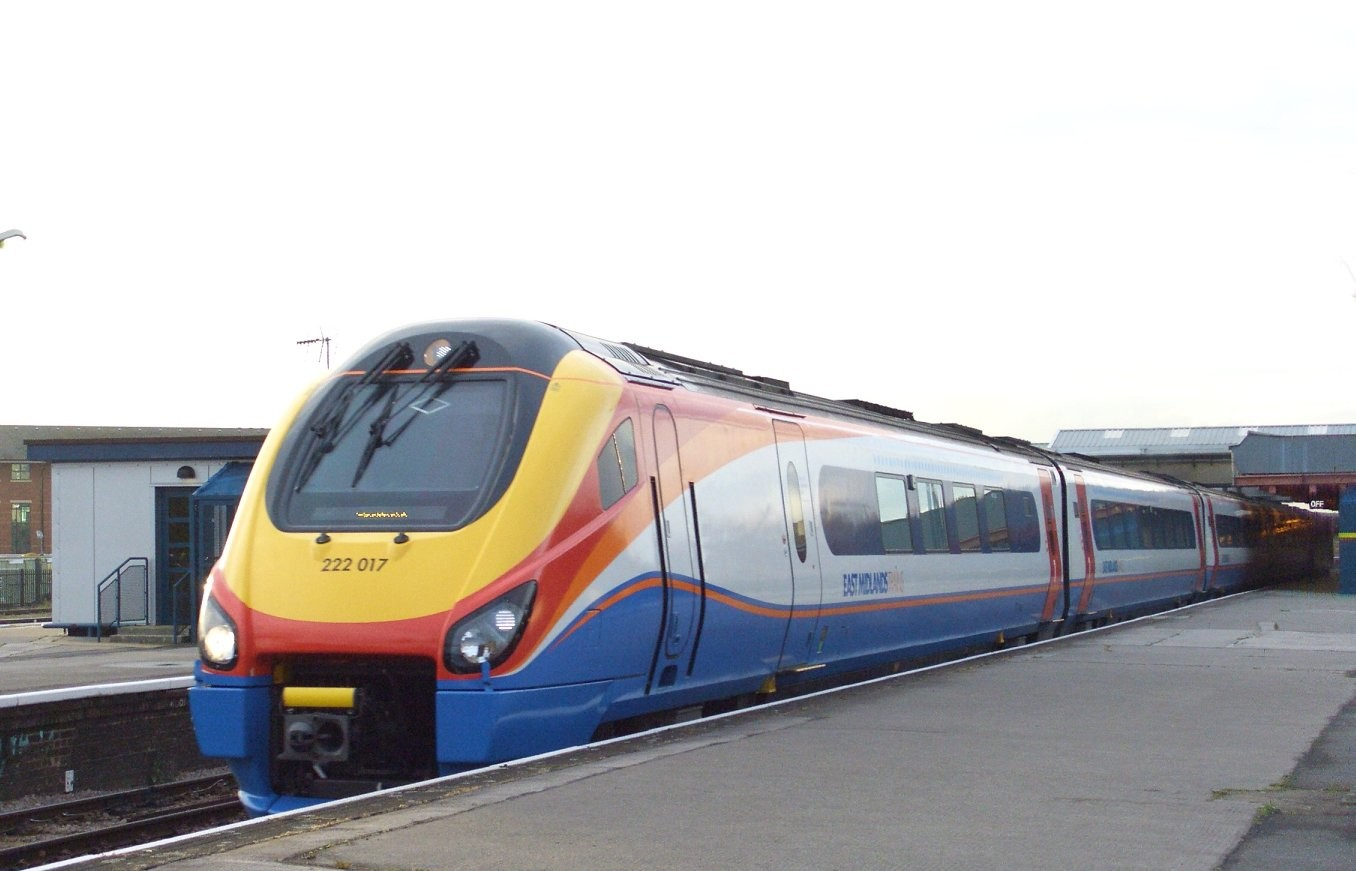
An East Midlands Trains liveried Class 222 Meridian at Derby

As part of a redrawing of the rail franchise map from November 2007, the Midland Mainline franchise was combined with some Central Trains services into a new East Midlands franchise.

In September 2006, the Department for Transport (DfT) announced that National Express, Arriva, FirstGroup and Stagecoach had been shortlisted to bid for the new franchise. In June 2007, the DfT awarded the franchise to Stagecoach, with the services operated by Midland Mainline transferring to East Midlands Trains on 11 November 2007.

Preceded by InterCity; As part of British Rail	Operator of Midland Main Line franchise 1996–2007	Succeeded by East Midlands Trains; East Midlands franchise
