= Sheffield Continental =

Railway passenger service in England

The Sheffield Continental was one of the four flagship named passenger trains operated by East Midlands Railway. There was only a south-bound Sheffield Continental service which was the 0647 train from Sheffield to London St Pancras.

The service started on 15 December 2008 as part of the December 2008 timetable changes. The service was named as part of an East Midlands Trains competition to name two new flagship services. It was named after the ability to change onto Eurostar services to the continent at London St Pancras.

The service was provided by two 5-car Class 222 Meridian trains coupled together to form a 10-car train.

The service lost its name when a new timetable was introduced on 14 December 2025.

== Stations served ==
As of 2019 the Sheffield Continental called at:

- Sheffield
- Chesterfield
- Derby
- East Midlands Parkway
- Loughborough
- Leicester
- Kettering
- Wellingborough
- London St Pancras

== Other named trains ==
East Midlands Railway operated three other named trains called:

- Master Cutler
- Robin Hood
- South Yorkshireman

== See also ==
- East Midlands Railway
- British Rail Class 222
