= Master Cutler (train) =

Overview
- Service type: Passenger train
- First service: 6 October 1947
- Last service: 12 December 2025
- Former operators: East Midlands Railway; Midland Mainline; InterCity; British Rail; London & North Eastern Railway

Route
- Termini: Sheffield; London St Pancras
- Average journey time: 2 hours
- Service frequency: Weekdays
- Train number: 1C20
- Line used: Midland Main Line

Technical
- Rolling stock: Class 222
- Operating speed: 125 mph

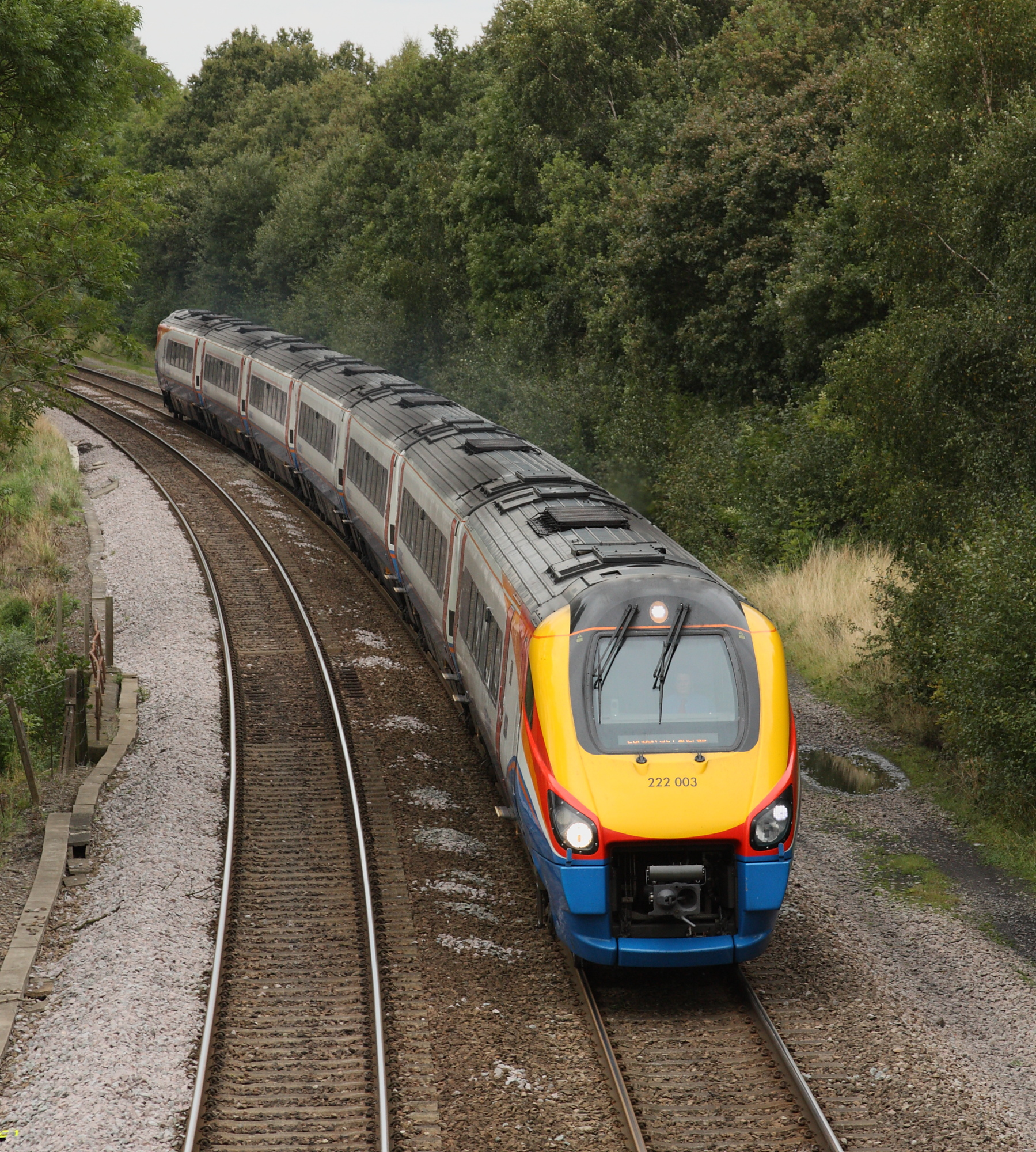
1C20 operated by 222003 at Danesmoor

The Master Cutler was a British named express passenger train operated by East Midlands Railway between Sheffield and London St Pancras. It has a somewhat complicated history, with the route and composition changing several times.

== History ==
In 1947 at a meeting of the Company of Cutlers in Hallamshire Ronald Matthews, a former holder of the office of Master Cutler and Chairman of the London and North Eastern Railway suggested that the 7.40 train from Sheffield Victoria to London Marylebone, returning at 18.15, should be named The Master Cutler. This was agreed by both the Company of Cutlers and the LNER. The then Master Cutler, A Balfour, later the 2nd Lord Riverdale, rode on the footplate of the inaugural train. It has since been a tradition that the Master Cutler ride with the driver of the train during their year of office. The Master Cutler was introduced by the LNER on 6 October 1947, running on the Great Central Main Line route from Sheffield Victoria to London Marylebone calling at Nottingham Victoria and Leicester Central. Upon nationalisation the following year, the service became the responsibility of the Eastern Region of British Railways. Known to staff simply as "The Cutler", the train carried a restaurant car and was generally hauled by a Gresley A3 Pacific.

In 1958, passenger services on the former Great Central route were beginning to be run down, and on 15 September of that year the title of the train switched to a new Class 40 diesel hauled service from Sheffield Victoria to London King's Cross calling at Retford only via East Coast Main Line.

On 28 September 1960, Pullman carriage stock was introduced. However, in early 1966 British Railways decided to concentrate Sheffield traffic on the Midland Main Line route to London St Pancras (and Leeds traffic on King's Cross), so the Pullman coaches were withdrawn on 4 October 1968; the Sheffield terminus of the train had already been switched from Victoria station to Midland station following the 1965 opening of the Nunnery Spur connecting the Worksop line to the latter station. (BR working timetable Section A May 68 to May 69 Supplement dated October 1968).

From 7 October 1968 the Master Cutler title was moved over to a fast train running to London St Pancras via the Midland line. It was later de-named, but the name was revived by InterCity in May 1987, for a daily train operated by InterCity 125 High Speed Trains.

As part of the timetable changes on 14 December 2008, East Midlands Trains reverted the service to its post-1968 historic route, and it operated from Sheffield to London St Pancras, via Chesterfield, Derby and Leicester, not starting from Leeds. Another change came with the use of a seven carriage Class 222 Meridian train to run the service instead of an InterCity 125 train that had operated it for the previous 21 years. The substantial reduction in the number of first-class seats caused by this change of train has led to noticeable overcrowding. In response East Midlands Trains actively sought to persuade business travellers to consider the other two named trains between Sheffield and London, the South Yorkshireman and the Sheffield Continental.

The service lost its name when a new timetable was introduced on 14 December 2025. At the time of cancellation, the Master Cutler name was carried by the 07:33 departure from Sheffield and 17:02 departure from London St Pancras. This was identified by the 'M' in the notes at the top of the timetable for these particular services.

== In preservation ==
The preserved Great Central Railway also runs re-enactments of the train on certain days using a rake of "Blood and Custard" Mark 1s. One of their locomotives used to work on the original trains during the 1950s, jointly owned BR standard class 5 73156; restored at Loughborough on the Great Central Railway in 2017, in the guise of 73084 Tintagel.

One of the train's headboards was presented to the Company of Cutlers by British Railways (Eastern Region) and Firth Vickers Stainless Steels Ltd on 21 April 1959, and another British Railways headboard is on display in the Great Hall at the National Railway Museum, York.

== Models ==
Palitoy produced under the Mainline Railways brand a train set called the Master Cutler containing a model of BR Blue Class 45 number 45039 The Manchester Regiment, two BR Blue/Grey MK1 SKs and a BSK. This was later changed to a BR Blue Class 31 number 31401, two BR Blue/Grey MK2D FOs and two BR Blue/Grey MK2D BSOs.

Hornby has produced a set consisting of A3 locomotive Prince Palatine in early British Railways express passenger blue livery. The set also consists of three blood and custard Gresley coaches. A coach pack is also present for the set.

Graham Farish/Bachmann also introduced a Master Cutler train set, in N gauge consisting of an ex-LNER V2 and three blood and custard coaches, it is now discontinued.

== Namesake ==
Between 1997 and 2005, HST powercar 43076 carried The Master Cutler 1947 - 1997 nameplates.
