= East Midlands Trains =

Train operating company in England

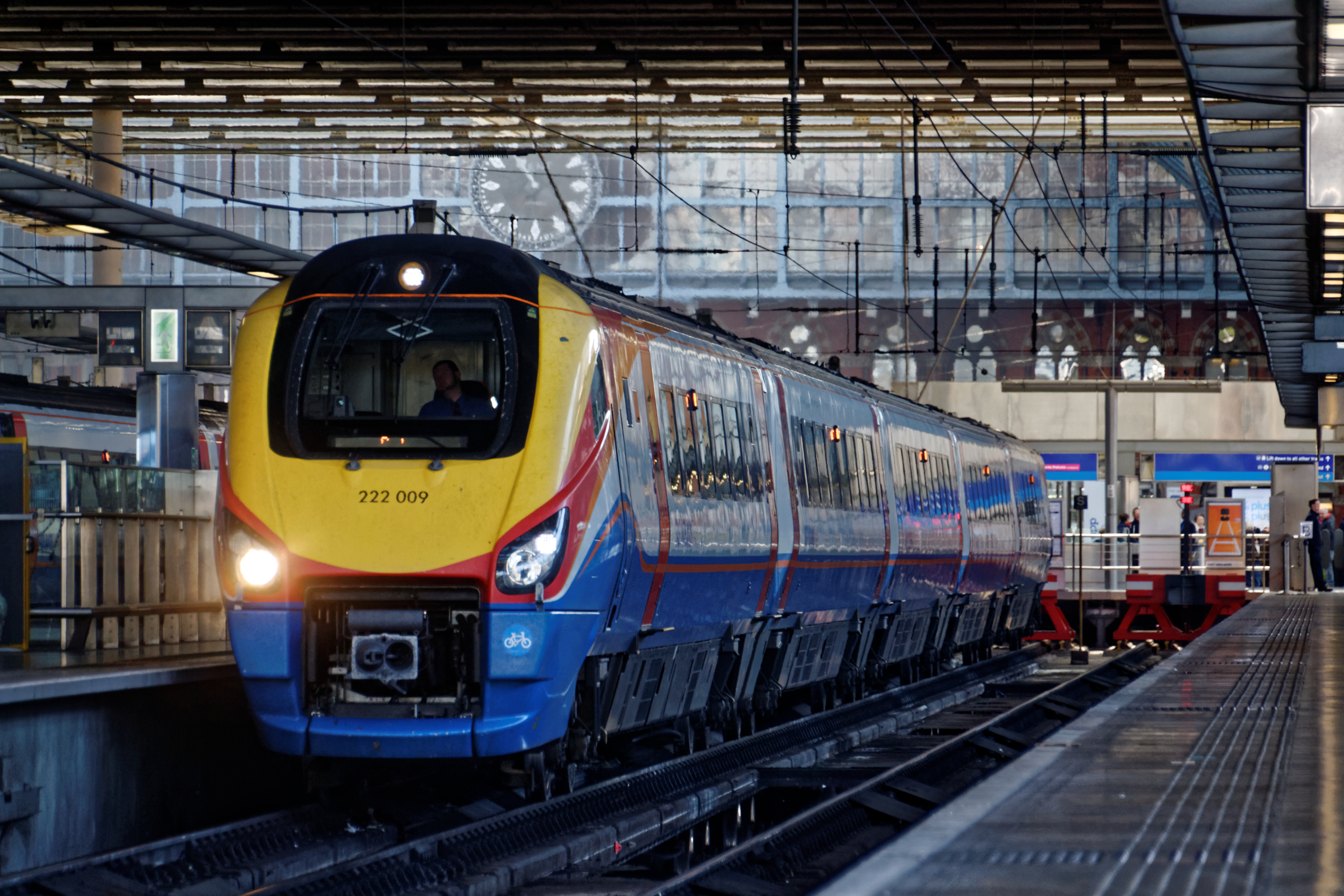
- A Class 222 Meridian at St Pancras in 2015

Overview
- Franchises: East Midlands; 11 November 2007 – 17 August 2019
- Main regions: East Midlands, Yorkshire and the Humber, East of England
- Other regions: Greater London, North West England
- Fleet: 24 Class 43 HST power cars 21 Class 153 Super Sprinter sets 15 Class 156 Super Sprinter sets 25 Class 158 Express Sprinter sets 27 Class 222 Meridian sets
- Stations called at: 87
- Stations operated: 89
- Parent company: Stagecoach
- Reporting mark: EM
- Predecessor: Central Trains; Midland Mainline
- Successor: East Midlands Railway

Technical
- Length: 1,567.5 km (974.0 mi)

Other
- Website: www.eastmidlandstrains.co.uk
Route map

East Midlands Trains (EMT) was a British train operating company owned by the transport group Stagecoach, which operated the East Midlands franchise between November 2007 and August 2019.

Following the Department for Transport (DfT) award of the newly created East Midlands franchise to Stagecoach, EMT commenced operations on 11 November 2007, taking over services previously performed by both Midland Mainline and the eastern parts of the Central Trains franchises. Based in Derby, the company provided train services in the East Midlands and parts of Yorkshire, chiefly in Lincolnshire, South Yorkshire, Nottinghamshire, Leicestershire, Derbyshire and Northamptonshire. Its operations were initially divided between two sub-brands: Mainline for inter-city services, and Connect for urban and suburban services.

Numerous changes were implemented during EMT's tenure, including the introduction of additional trains between Sheffield and London along with infrastructure improvements to enable faster services to be operated. The franchise developed a reputation for its attention to customer service and public safety, winning multiple awards for these aspects. Passenger numbers also grew, necessitating the lengthening of several services to accommodate this. EMT's franchise period was extended on multiple occasions, before rival transport company Abellio was announced as the next franchisee in April 2019 after Stagecoach was disqualified from the bidding process for failing to meet employee pension obligations in its bid. Accordingly, EMT's services were transferred to East Midlands Railway on 18 August 2019.

== History ==
=== Background ===
In June 2006, the Department for Transport (DfT) announced its intention to restructure several rail franchises, which included an East Midlands franchise that combined the Midland Mainline franchise with the East Midlands services of the Central Trains franchise. In September 2006 the DfT announced that Arriva, FirstGroup, National Express and Stagecoach had been shortlisted to bid for the franchise.

In June 2007, the DfT awarded the East Midlands franchise to Stagecoach. Services operated by Central Trains and Midland Mainline transferred to East Midlands Trains on 11 November 2007.

=== Changes ===
During 2008, EMT introduced extensive timetable revisions; amongst other changes, journey times on the principal Sheffield-London route were reduced considerably, a feat that had largely been enabled by the high performance of its British Rail Class 222 Meridian fleet. One year later, in partnership with the South Yorkshire Passenger Transport Executive, EMT expanded its services on the route to encompass two trains every hour. A substantial growth in passenger numbers and associated revenue were recorded; in 2014, EMT observed that it only expected demand to continue increasing for the foreseeable future.

Further decreases in journey times were achieved by EMT during the 2010s. One particularly impactful change was the completion of infrastructure improvements on 9 December 2013 that enabled 125 mph (200 km/h) along major stretches of the Midland Main Line for the first time. To achieve this, EMT had invested £70 million into the improvement of almost 160 miles of track over the course of several years; the scheme was the route's biggest transformation in decades. The operator had worked closely with the national railway infrastructure company Network Rail on this and other initiatives to improve the route, such as a major re-signalling scheme performed in and around Nottingham station at a cost of £100 million largely performed during the summer of 2013.

EMT also implemented numerous schemes to enhance safety; consequently, the franchise was awarded the NRA Safety Award three years in a row. Such measures have included the installation of platform-end fencing and the presence of trespass guards at more trafficked stations; attention was also paid to reducing the risks associated with level crossings and great reduce their misuse via its work with the British Transport Police. EMT also cooperated with agencies including Network Rail, ASLEF, and the Samaritans in the prevention of suicides, which has led to extensive staff training, fund raising events, and campaign signage at several of its stations.

Amidst a background of ongoing rail strikes on a national level, the National Union of Rail, Maritime and Transport Workers (RMT) warned in September 2017 that EMT employees could be balloted for potential industrial action following a breakdown in negotiations over an ongoing pay rise dispute. The dispute was eventually settled without industrial action, and the threat of strikes on East Midlands Trains services was dropped. As a result of staff engagement surveys, EMT launched its ‘Executive on Tour’ programme during the 2010s to bring about a higher level of contact between the franchise's upper management and its frontline staff, which included regular in-person visits and open discussions about the business between staff to increase engagement and improve understanding.

In November 2014, EMT was recognised as the Passenger Operator of the Year at RAIL's National Rail Awards for the high quality of customer service that it provided in comparison to other franchises offer. According to the organisation, service levels had substantially increased in the region since the implementation of the franchising system in 1996, and that the company had performed better than most peers in response to service disruptors such as Cyclone Dirk and other natural phenomenon.

Amid EMT's franchise period, there was ambitious plans to electrify the majority of the Midland Main Line by 2020 at an expected cost of £800 million. In January 2013, Network Rail expected the electrification scheme to cost £500 million and be undertaken in stages during Control Period 5 (April 2014 – March 2019; with Bedford to Corby section electrified by 2017, Kettering to Derby and Nottingham by 2019 and Derby to Sheffield by 2020. the organisation also recommended procuring the Class 801 in 10 car formations for the InterCity services, However, these plans were put on hold by the Transport Secretary, Patrick McLoughlin, in June 2015.

=== Demise ===
While originally scheduled to end in March 2015, East Midlands Trains succeeded in having its franchise extended on several occasions. Nevertheless, the company continued to have to periodically submit competitive bids and emerge as the superior offering amongst its rivals to continue operating its services.

In March 2017, the DfT announced that Stagecoach, Arriva UK Trains and a joint venture between FirstGroup and Trenitalia had been shortlisted to bid for the next East Midlands franchise. Abellio was added to the shortlist in February 2018. FirstGroup and Trenitalia pulled out of the bidding process in April 2018 to focus on the West Coast Partnership franchise. An Invitation to Tender was issued in June 2018, detailing the improvements that bidders for the franchise must make. In April 2019, the DfT awarded the East Midlands franchise to Abellio; Stagecoach had been disqualified from the process because its submission failed to meet employee pension obligations. Accordingly, East Midlands Trains' services were transferred to East Midlands Railway on 18 August 2019.

== Services ==
=== Overview ===
East Midlands Trains initially divided its services between two sub-brands: Mainline inter-city services, and Connect urban and suburban services, which mainly came from the Central Trains franchise. However, from April 2008, the company dropped the "Mainline" and "Connect" branding in favour of "London" and "Local" services. It also has four broad routes for the areas in which it operates, except for the high-speed services, which all serve London.

EMT promised better integration between "London" and "Local" services, together with increased punctuality and becoming more user-friendly.

On 25 November 2008, Peter Bone (MP for Wellingborough) asked if the Secretary of State for Transport supports the "In the Can" campaign, whereby sardines are sent to the Chief Executive to show dissatisfaction at perceived overcrowding. Helen Southworth (then MP for Warrington South) also raised the overcrowding issue on the same day.

=== London services ===
The service pattern at the start of the franchise was of 4 off-peak departures from London: 2 fast (1 each to Sheffield and Nottingham) and 2 stopping (1 each to Derby and Nottingham). Sheffield peak-hour trains extended from and to Leeds, with weekend services also extending to York/Scarborough. 1 peak-hour Derby service was extended to Burton-on-Trent and one to Barnsley. EMT made no significant changes until the introduction of its December 2008 timetable.

In December 2008, EMT made significant changes to the service pattern, which was similar to the current one (see below). There are five off-peak departures from London: 2 fast (1 to Sheffield and 1 to Nottingham), 1 semi-fast (initially to Derby; extended to Sheffield from December 2009) and 2 stopping (1 to Nottingham and 1 to Corby). A smaller number of Sheffield peak-hour trains continue to extend from and to Leeds, with weekend services also extending to York/Scarborough. In addition a Nottingham service is extended to start from Lincoln on weekdays and Saturdays. There were plans initially for 2 return services to Skegness through from London in the summer; however, these currently run through from Derby instead of London, because of speed restrictions around Boston. The Burton-on-Trent and Barnsley services ceased at the beginning of the December 2008 timetable, when Corby services began. One Corby service was extended to Melton Mowbray at the outset, and a second was added to Derby from May 2010.

On 9 December 2013, the Midland Main Line officially started running at 125 mph (200 km/h) in some areas, leading to reductions in several journey times.

=== Local services ===
The Liverpool Lime Street via Warrington Central, Manchester Oxford Road and Piccadilly, Sheffield, Nottingham, Peterborough and Ely to Norwich service was previously provided by Central Trains. Nottinghamshire County Council has consistently campaigned for better services between the four core cities of Liverpool, Manchester, Sheffield and Nottingham. Network Rail's plans for the Northern Hub would deliver extra train paths along the Hope Valley Line, enabling more trains to run from the North West to the East Midlands. In December 2012, double-unit trains were provided for services between Manchester and Nottingham to ease overcrowding.

=== Routes ===
East Midlands Trains' services were categorized into two types:

- London: inter-city services out of London St Pancras station, along the Midland Main Line, to various towns and cities in the East Midlands region including Bedford, Kettering, Corby, Leicester, Nottingham, Derby and Sheffield. Some peak-time services also served Lincoln, Doncaster, Leeds and York, while a single Saturday service also ran to and from Scarborough in the summer. These services all used Class 222 trains or HST sets, which were painted in a white livery.
- Local: short- and medium-distance services mostly within the East Midlands region, plus the long-distance route between Liverpool Lime Street and Norwich. These services were operated by Sprinters (Class 153s, Class 156s and Class 158s). The Class 158 units were painted in a white livery, while the remaining units were all in a blue livery.

As of January 2018, the typical off-peak weekday East Midlands Trains services, with frequencies in trains per hour (tph), included: (Note: London services are shown in the outbound direction, while local services are shown from west to east.)

London
Route	tph	Calling at	Stock
London St Pancras to Sheffield	1	Leicester, Derby, Chesterfield	222
London St Pancras to Sheffield	1	Leicester, Loughborough, East Midlands Parkway, Long Eaton, Derby, Chesterfield	222
London St Pancras to Nottingham	1	Market Harborough, Leicester, East Midlands Parkway	43
London St Pancras to Nottingham	1	Luton Airport Parkway, Bedford, Wellingborough, Kettering, Market Harborough, Leicester, Loughborough, Beeston	222
London St Pancras to Corby	1	Luton, Bedford, Wellingborough, Kettering	222
London St Pancras to Leeds via Nottingham	1	Market Harborough, Leicester, East Midlands Parkway, Nottingham, Langley Mill, Alfreton, Chesterfield, Sheffield, Wakefield Westgate	43
Local
Route	tph	Calling at	Stock
Liverpool Lime Street to Norwich (regional express)	1	Liverpool South Parkway, Widnes, Warrington Central, Manchester Oxford Road, Manchester Piccadilly, Stockport, Sheffield, Chesterfield, Alfreton, Nottingham, Grantham, Peterborough, Ely, Thetford	153/156/158
Crewe to Derby	1	Alsager, Kidsgrove, Longport, Stoke-on-Trent, Longton, Blythe Bridge, Uttoxeter, Tutbury and Hatton, Peartree (limited)	153/156/158
Matlock to Newark Castle	1	Matlock Bath, Cromford, Whatstandwell, Ambergate, Belper, Duffield, Derby, Spondon (limited), Long Eaton, Attenborough, Beeston, Nottingham, Carlton, Burton Joyce (1tp2h), Lowdham, Thurgarton (1tp2h), Bleasby (1tp2h), Fiskerton, Rolleston (1tp2h); Stations served two-hourly are all served by the same train.	153/156/158
Leicester to Lincoln	1	Syston, Sileby, Barrow-upon-Soar, Loughborough, East Midlands Parkway, Beeston, Nottingham, Newark Castle, Collingham, Swinderby (1tp2h), Hykeham	153/156/158
Worksop to Nottingham	1	Whitwell, Creswell, Langwith-Whaley Thorns, Shirebrook, Mansfield Woodhouse, Mansfield, Sutton Parkway, Kirkby-in-Ashfield, Newstead (Worksop-bound only), Hucknall, Bulwell (Nottingham-bound only)	153/156/158
Mansfield Woodhouse to Nottingham	1	Mansfield, Sutton Parkway, Kirkby-in-Ashfield, Newstead (Nottingham-bound only), Hucknall, Bulwell (Mansfield-bound only)	153/156/158
Nottingham to Skegness	1	Netherfield (limited), Radcliffe (limited), Bingham, Aslockton (irregular), Elton and Orston (limited), Bottesford (1tp2h), Grantham, Ancaster (limited), Rauceby (limited), Sleaford, Heckington, Swineshead (limited), Hubberts Bridge (limited), Boston, Thorpe Culvert (limited), Wainfleet, Havenhouse (limited)	153/156/158
Newark North Gate to Grimsby Town	0.5	Collingham (limited), Swinderby (limited), Hykeham (limited), Lincoln, Market Rasen, Barnetby, Habrough; Some of these services are separated into two at Lincoln.	153/156/158
Lincoln to Peterborough	1	Metheringham, Ruskington, Sleaford, Spalding	153/156/158
Doncaster to Lincoln	–	Gainsborough Lea Road, Saxilby; Limited service; only 4–5 trains each way per day.	153/156/158

=== Named trains ===
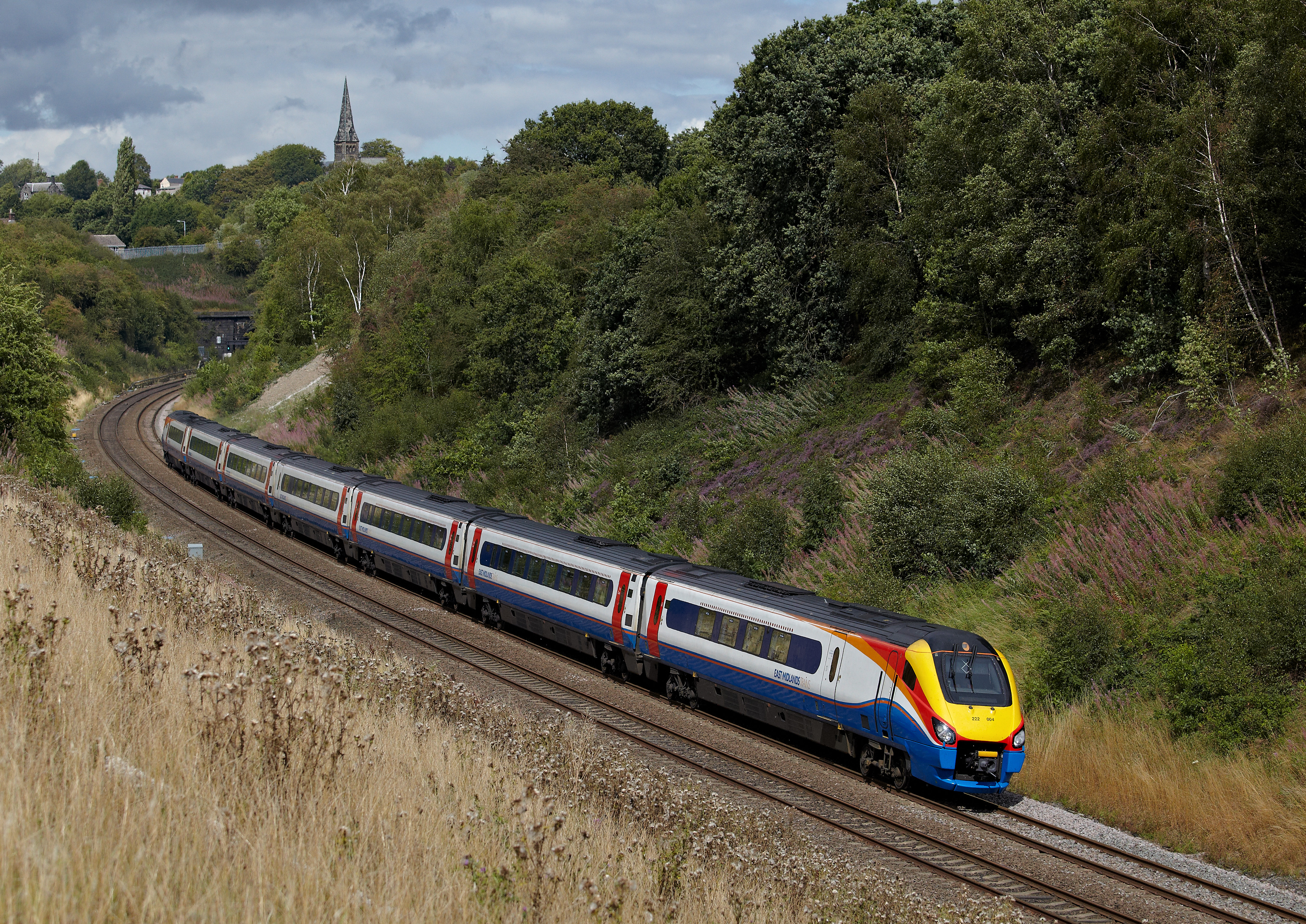
An East Midlands Trains Class 222 Meridian passing Clay Cross, Derbyshire

- The Sheffield Continental: 06:49 Sheffield to St Pancras, no return working. Introduced in December 2008.
- The Master Cutler: 07:29 Sheffield-St Pancras and 16:58 return. A named service inherited from Midland Mainline.
- The South Yorkshireman: 07:46 Sheffield-St Pancras and 17:58 return. Introduced in December 2008.
- The Robin Hood: 07:10 Nottingham-St Pancras and 16:15 return. A named service inherited from Midland Mainline.

== Ticketing ==
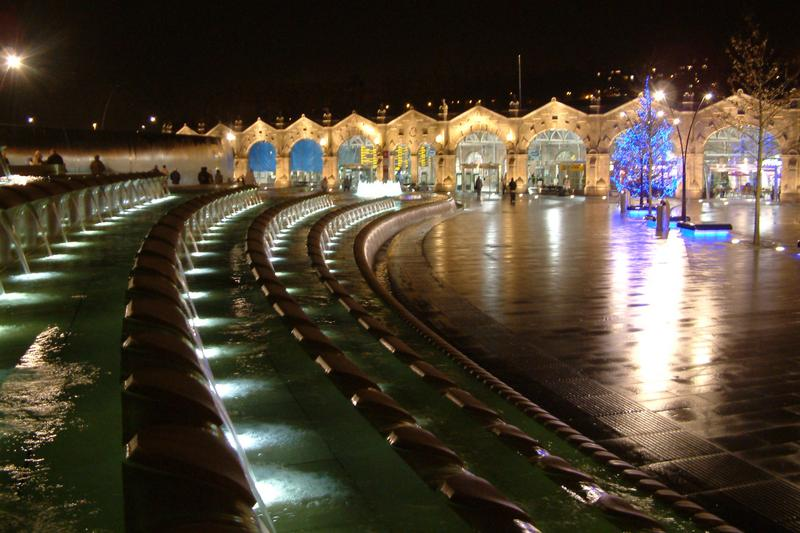
Sheffield is now served twice an hour by faster, modern trains on the London route. Liverpool – Norwich route trains were doubled in 2011

Tickets were sold in advance, super off-peak, off-peak and anytime formats, the cheapest of these being advance fares. In addition, East Midlands Trains accepted the wider Stagecoach Group's smart card scheme, branded "Stagecoach Smart".

=== Penalty fares ===
The company introduced a penalty fare scheme in late 2009, covering all mainline stations served by EMT from London to Sheffield via Corby, Leicester, Nottingham, Derby, Alfreton. During 2016, the penalty fare scheme was extended in scope to include the Robin Hood Line from Nottingham to Worksop.

=== Megatrain ===
Stagecoach Group, EMT's parent company, introduced Megatrain fares on its London routes on 2 January 2008 operating to/from London St Pancras International to Leicester, Loughborough, Derby, Nottingham, Chesterfield and Sheffield.

Megatrain fares were also introduced on Route 2 between Sheffield, Chesterfield, Nottingham and Peterborough or Norwich.

==== MegabusPlus ====
East Midlands Parkway was used as an interchange station for combined multi-modal journeys under the brand name "MegabusPlus", whereby passengers were carried by road coach from the cities in the north of England to East Midlands Parkway, where passengers transferred to rail for the service to London.

Routes operated under the "MegabusPlus" brand were between London and:

- Hull via Scunthorpe
- York via Castleford and Harrogate
- Huddersfield via Bradford and Halifax

The bus from Hull and Scunthorpe also had a stop at Doncaster at the launch of MegabusPlus, but due to lack of demand in Doncaster, the service stopped calling there.

== Franchise commitments ==
Upon its award of the franchise in 2006, Stagecoach publicly revealed its plan to invest in excess of £91 million on a range of service improvements across the service region.

=== Train services ===
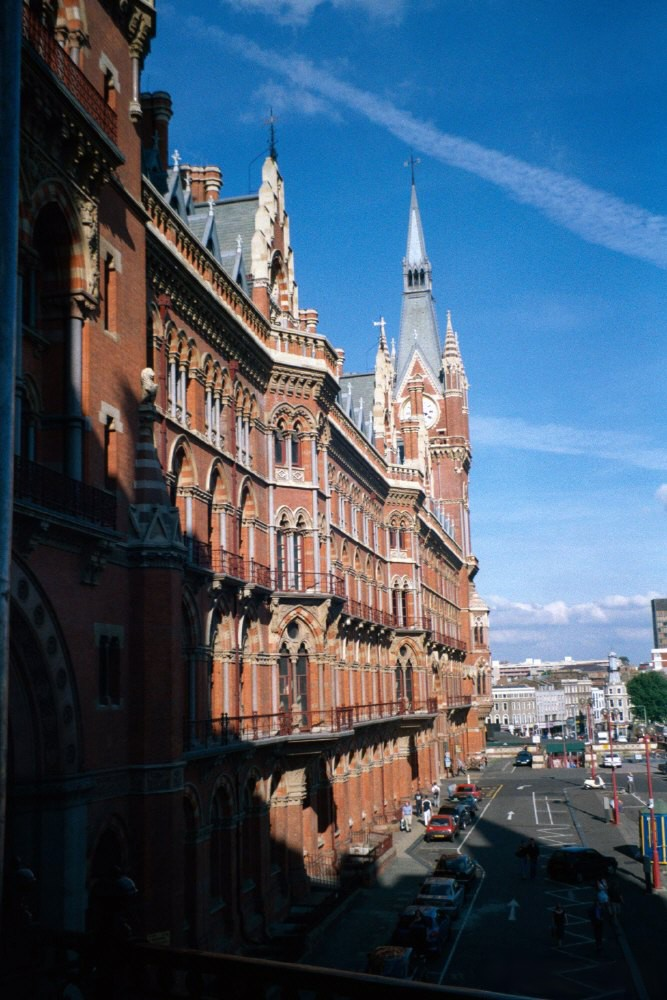
St Pancras International, the London terminus of East Midlands Trains' services

Perhaps on the most outwardly perceivable undertaking during EMT's tenure was a total fleet refurbishment programme. At a cost of £30 million, the refurbishment involved every single train in the company's fleet receiving upgrades and refits. Benefits of this work include train interiors being improved considerably along with a major year-on-year reduction in delay minutes by 20% by late 2014.

The number of departures from London were also increased from four to five an hour off-peak incorporating Corby services and extending the hours of operation with earlier arrival and later departures, to allow better connections with Eurostar at St Pancras.

On 9 December 2013, 125 miles per hour (201 km/h) running was introduced on extended stretches of the Midland Main Line following a multi-year upgrade programme, involving the installation of improved signalling and additional tracks, at a reported cost of £70 million. The upgraded infrastructure, amongst other benefits, enabled EMT to operate its trains at faster speeds from Nottingham and Sheffield to London St Pancras.

=== Stations ===
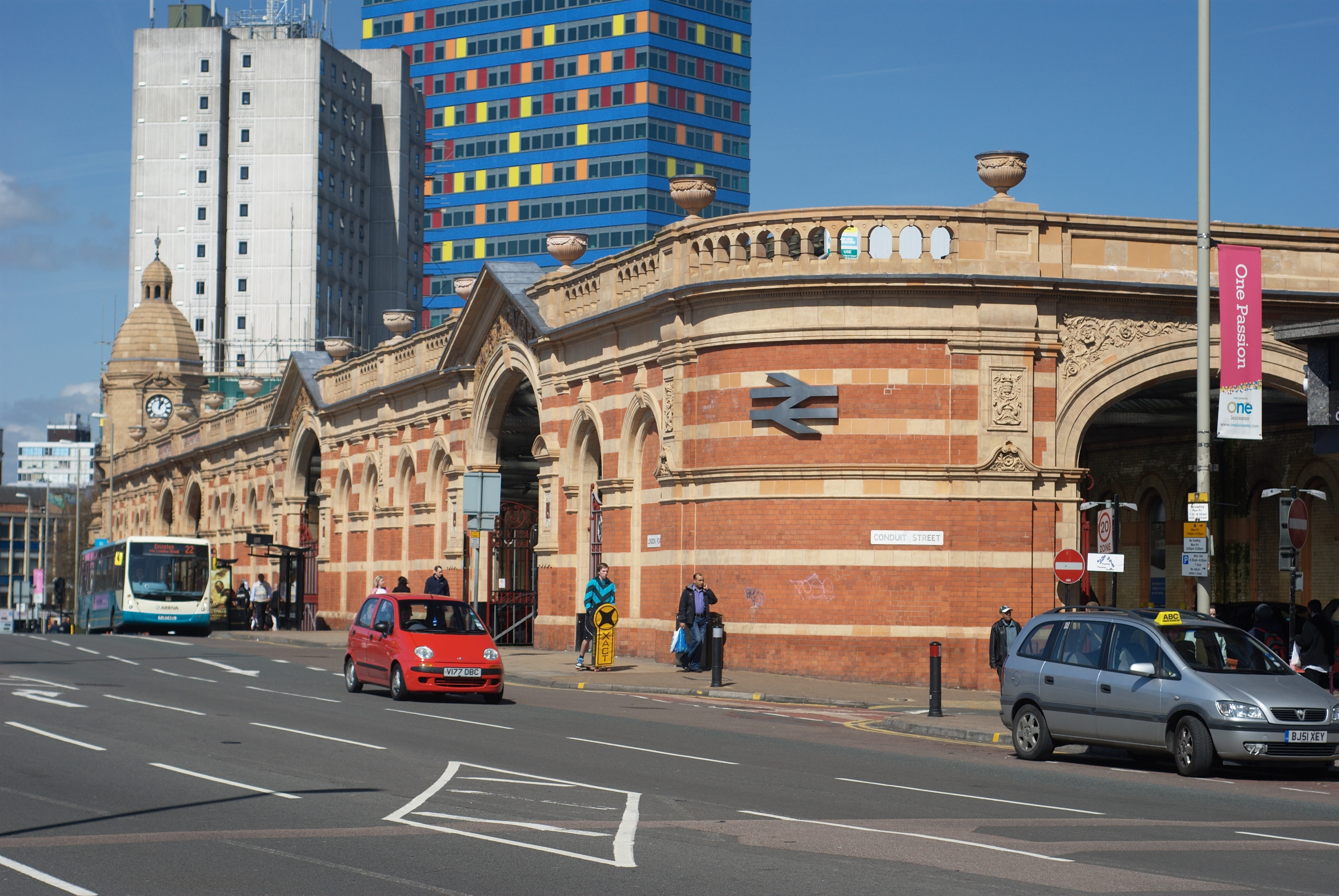
Leicester had received an enhanced service with earlier and later trains so that business travellers can connect with the continent.

More than £5 million was pledged for station enhancements. These included the opening of East Midlands Parkway station to serve East Midlands Airport and a new station being opened in Corby.

The provision of Wi-Fi internet at key stations including Leicester, Derby, and Sheffield. Installation of ticket barriers at more stations including London St Pancras, Derby and Nottingham.

To better accommodate the use of its services by cyclists, EMT launched a series of cycle hubs at major stations, including Sheffield, Leicester and Nottingham. This initiative led to an additional 1,000 cycle spaces being created, along secure storage and changing facilities, bike repair apparatus and local cycling information facilities onsite.

Derby Etches Park train maintenance depot underwent an extensive upgrade.

Introduction of smart card technology, similar to that used on South West Trains, at all London route stations and all those in the Leicester/Derby/Nottingham commuter triangle, and the installation of more self-service ticket machines across the network.

East Midlands Trains also managed stations at which they did not operate services. These stations were all only served by CrossCountry. They were Hinckley, Narborough, South Wigston, Willington and Burton-on-Trent.

=== On board ===
Originally, it was proposed to remove the buffet cars from High Speed Train sets as they were relatively heavy and used only to cook breakfast on some trains; they were intended to be replaced by an at-seat trolley service. However, following a review of the decision amid passenger outcry for its retention, the company opted to instead launch an enhanced catering service for the start of the May 2008 timetable. Since September 2010, Rail Gourmet had provided all standard class catering. Wi-Fi had been available on all services from London since 5 September 2010.

== Performance ==
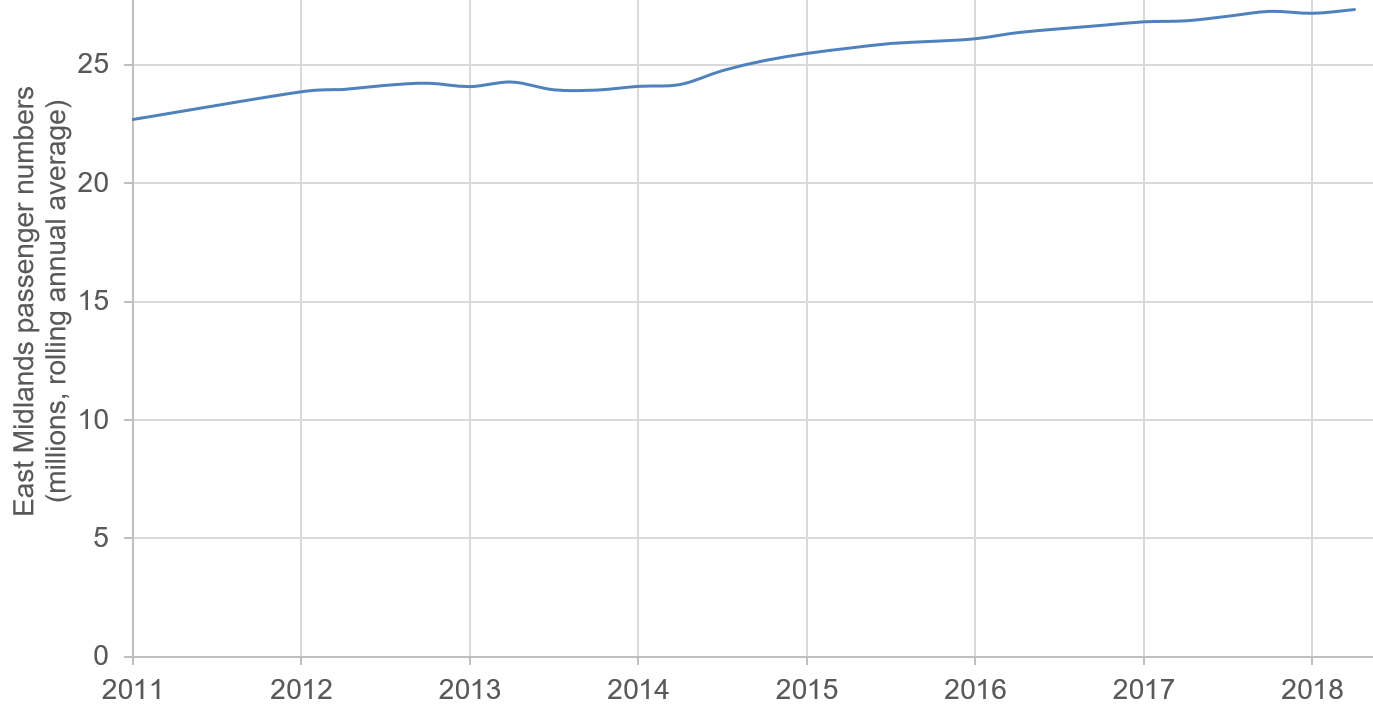
Passenger numbers on the East Midlands franchise from 2010/11 to Q1 2018/19.

Stagecoach have targeted 90.3% (PPM) on London services and 87% (PPM) on Local services. Previously, the Central Trains franchise had had difficulties with timekeeping due to the high number of potential clashes with late running other services en route and use of insufficient stock, causing long dwell times at stations due to slow unloading and loading. Figures released rated Central Trains' performance at 87.8% for the PPM (Public Performance Measure) over the first quarter of the financial year 2007/8. Latest figures released by NR (Network Rail) rated performance over the last year (up to 12 October 2013) at 91.5% (MAA) and 92.0% (PPM) for the seventh period of the financial year 2013/14.

== Rolling stock ==
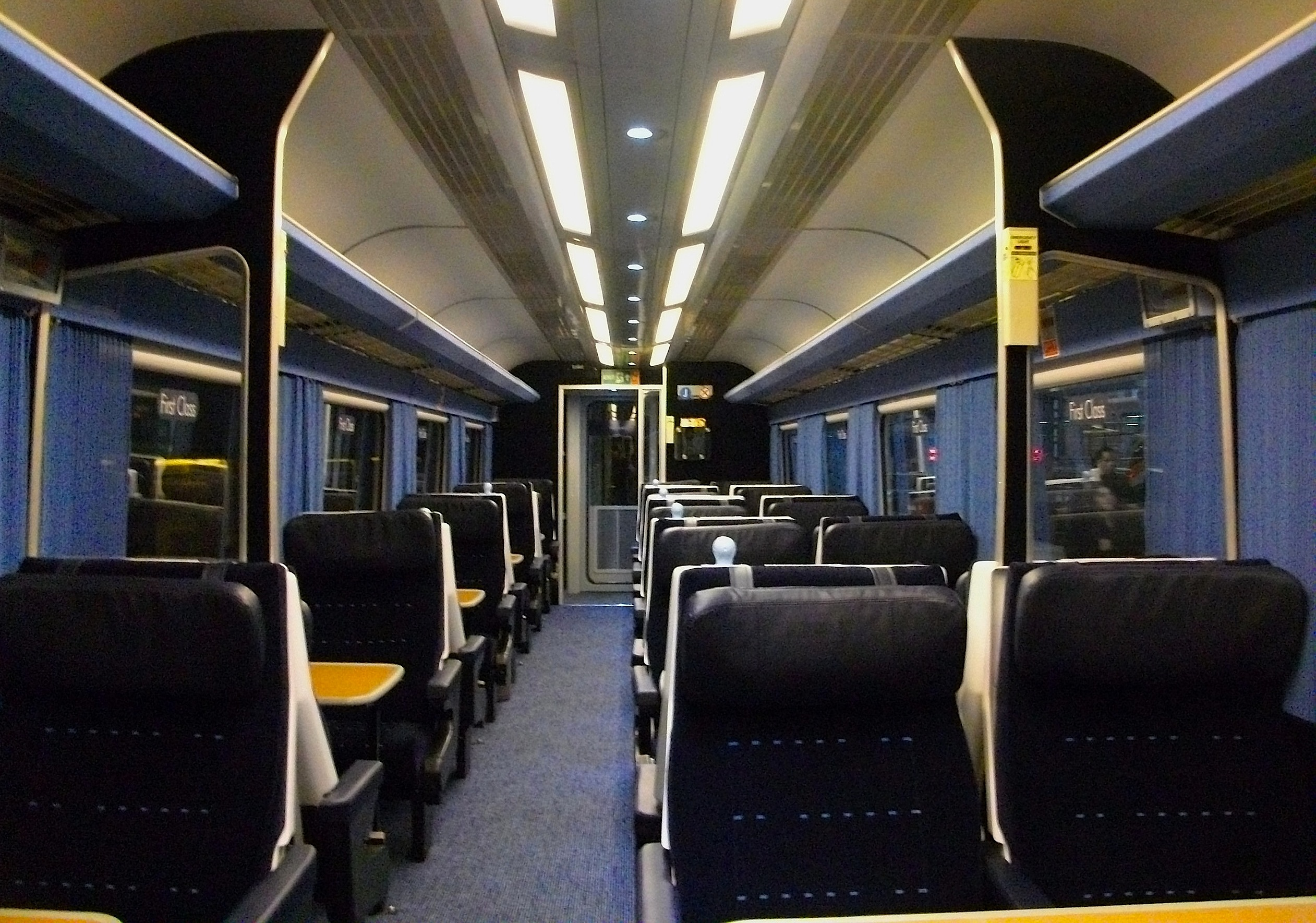
The refurbished First Class interior aboard a Mark 3 Trailer First HST carriage

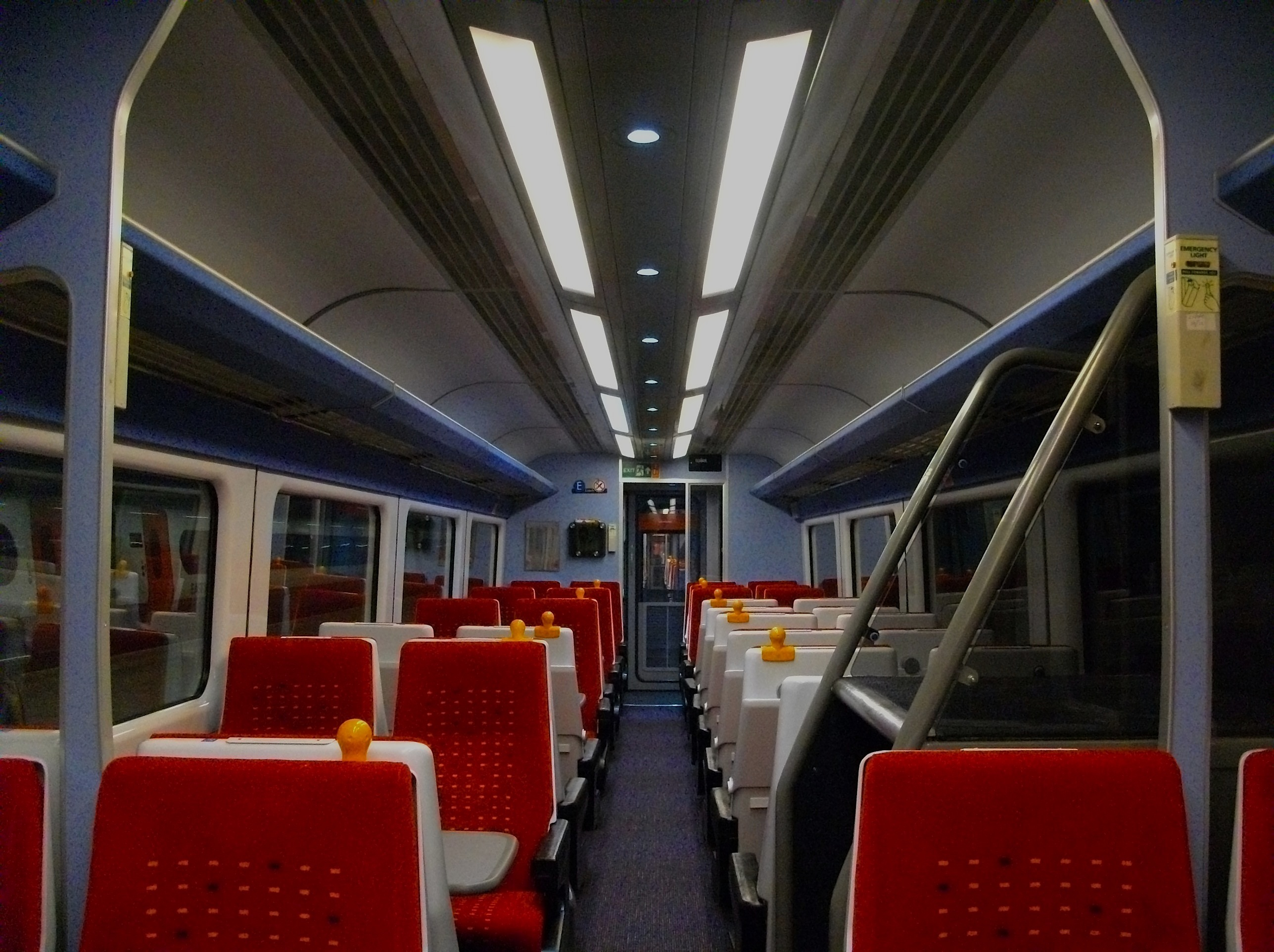
The refurbished Standard Class interior aboard a Mark 3 Trailer Standard HST carriage

Other than the lines to Liverpool and Manchester, no East Midlands Trains routes were electrified north of Bedford and all trains were diesel-powered.

East Midlands Trains inherited Midland Mainline’s InterCity 125 (HST) and Class 222 Meridian diesel-electric high-speed trains, along with some of the Sprinter diesel units (classes 153/156/158) formerly operated by Central Trains.

All Class 158 units had been refurbished in a style similar to sister company South West Trains' fleet, although with a higher seating capacity.

East Midlands Trains announced in March 2008 that it was to reform its Class 222 sets to prevent overcrowding. This saw the remaining 4-car Class 222 units receive an extra vehicle to become 5-car sets. This was accomplished by reducing one of the 8-car sets to a 5-car, with the remaining 8-car sets reduced to 7-cars. Extra capacity on long-distance routes was provided by running pairs of 5-car sets coupled together.

Hull Trains made a decision to use only Class 180 Adelante units, with its Class 222 Meridian units transferring to East Midlands Trains.

East Midlands Trains began the service from Corby on 23 February 2009. Initially, this was made up of one train per day in each direction, using the existing Meridian fleet. The full Corby service started on 27 April 2009.

The Sprinter fleet that EMT inherited at the start of the franchise was in a very poor state. Problems ranged from basic and simple to major complicated faults. The fleet was put together from various sources – around four different previous companies, with some coming directly from passenger work but some that had been lying idle surplus to requirements off lease in sidings. East Midlands Trains claimed that it would take the lifetime of the franchise to get the trains to a standard that it was happy with. In addition to the various sources of the trains, passenger figures given to the Department for Transport prior to the franchise were incorrect, leading to a shortfall in the number of seats provided (a 26% decrease in capacity on route 2) compared with what was required.

Four additional Class 156 DMUs, leased from Angel Trains were cascaded from Northern to enable more route 2 services to run as four-coach trains by using these cascaded Class 156s on Skegness services instead of Class 158s. From December 2012 when the Sprinter refurbishment programme was complete, all route 2 services between Liverpool and Nottingham were able to operate as four-coach trains. In addition, from December 2011 the 13:52 from Liverpool operated through to Norwich.

In early 2018, East Midlands Trains obtained an additional three 6-car InterCity 125 sets from Grand Central, which were used to improve capacity on the Midland Main Line by replacing Class 222 units on some services. The first of these powercars entered service in February 2018, with powercar 43467 being named "Nottinghamshire Fire and Rescue Service"/"British Transport Police Nottingham" in commemoration of the services' work during the fire at Nottingham station earlier in the year.

In mid 2018, East Midlands Trains received an extra four Class 153s from Great Western Railway.

=== Fleet at end of franchise ===
Class	Image	Type	Top speed		Number	Cars	Routes operated	Built
Class	Image	Type	mph	km/h	Number	Cars	Routes operated	Built
InterCity 125 trains (HSTs)
43		Loco	125	201	30	6 or 8	Inter-City Midland Main Line; Nottingham – Skegness (Summer Saturdays only)	1975–1982
Mark 3		Coach	125	201	136	6 or 8	Inter-City Midland Main Line; Nottingham – Skegness (Summer Saturdays only)	1975–1988
Multiple units
153 Super Sprinter		DMU	75	120	21	1	Regional routes	1987–1988
156 Super Sprinter		DMU	75	120	15	2	Regional routes	1987–1989
158/0 Express Sprinter		DMU	90	145	26	2	Regional routes	1989–1992
222 Meridian		DMU	125	201	4	4	Inter-City routes	2003–2005
222 Meridian		DMU	125	201	17	5	Inter-City routes	2003–2005
222 Meridian		DMU	125	201	6	7	Inter-City routes	2003–2005

== Accidents and incidents ==
=== Barrow upon Soar ===
On 1 February 2008, an East Midlands train was involved in an incident at Barrow upon Soar. The train hit a footbridge in its path, after a road vehicle had struck and damaged the bridge causing it to be foul of the line. Six passengers were on board the service and the driver had to be cut free from the driving cab.

=== Market Harborough incident ===
On 20 February 2010, an express from London St Pancras to Sheffield was derailed north of Market Harborough, causing track damage and major disruption to rail services for three days. East Midlands Trains put an emergency timetable into place, running services via Melton Mowbray on 21, 22 and 23 February. A complete safety check found no problems in the rest of the fleet.

== Depots ==
Train crew depots were located at:

- London – London route drivers, Train Managers, Customer Hosts and revenue protection officers
- Leicester – Revenue Protection Officers
- Derby – London and Local route Drivers, Train Managers, Senior Conductors, Crew Leaders, Chefs, Customer Hosts and Revenue Protection Officers
- Nottingham – Local route Drivers (although 12 Drivers trained on HST's for Summer Skegness and Charter trains), Train Managers, Senior Conductors, Customer Hosts and Revenue Protection Officers
- Sheffield – Train Managers, Crew Leaders, Chefs, Customer Hosts and Revenue Protection Officers
- Boston – Local route Drivers and Senior Conductors
- Lincoln – Local route Drivers and Senior Conductors
- Norwich – Local route Drivers and Senior Conductors

Trains were maintained at:

- London, Cricklewood (fueling and cleaning of HST & 222)
- Derby Etches Park (heavy maintenance of 222, 153, 156 & 158, light maintenance of HST)
- Nottingham Eastcroft (light maintenance of 153, 156 & 158)
- Boston (cleaning of 153, 156 & 158)
- Arriva TrainCare, Crewe (light maintenance of 153, 156 & 158)
- Leeds, Neville Hill (heavy maintenance of HST)
- Crown Point (light maintenance of 158)

Shunter drivers were employed by EMT at Derby, Nottingham and Leeds.

On-train catering for standard-class passengers on routes 1 and 2 was, as of September 2010, contracted out to Rail Gourmet, which had depots at Derby, Nottingham and Sheffield.

Although all stations are owned by Network Rail, their day-to-day management is handled by train operating companies. EMT managed the following stations: Wellingborough, Kettering, Corby, Market Harborough, Leicester, Melton Mowbray, Oakham, Stamford, Narborough, Hinckley, Loughborough, East Midlands Parkway, Long Eaton, Derby, Kidsgrove, Chesterfield, Sheffield, Beeston, Nottingham, Alfreton, Sleaford, Boston and Skegness. They also had staff at St Pancras International, although the station itself is managed by Network Rail.

== See also ==
- Rail franchising in Great Britain
- List of companies operating trains in the United Kingdom
- Rail transport in Great Britain

== Footnotes ==
Preceded by Central Trains; Central Trains franchise	Operator of East Midlands franchise 2007–2019	Succeeded by East Midlands Railway
Preceded by Midland Mainline; Midland Main Line franchise	Operator of East Midlands franchise 2007–2019	Succeeded by East Midlands Railway
