= British Rail Class 222 =

Diesel multiple-unit high-speed passenger train

British Rail Class 222 Meridian
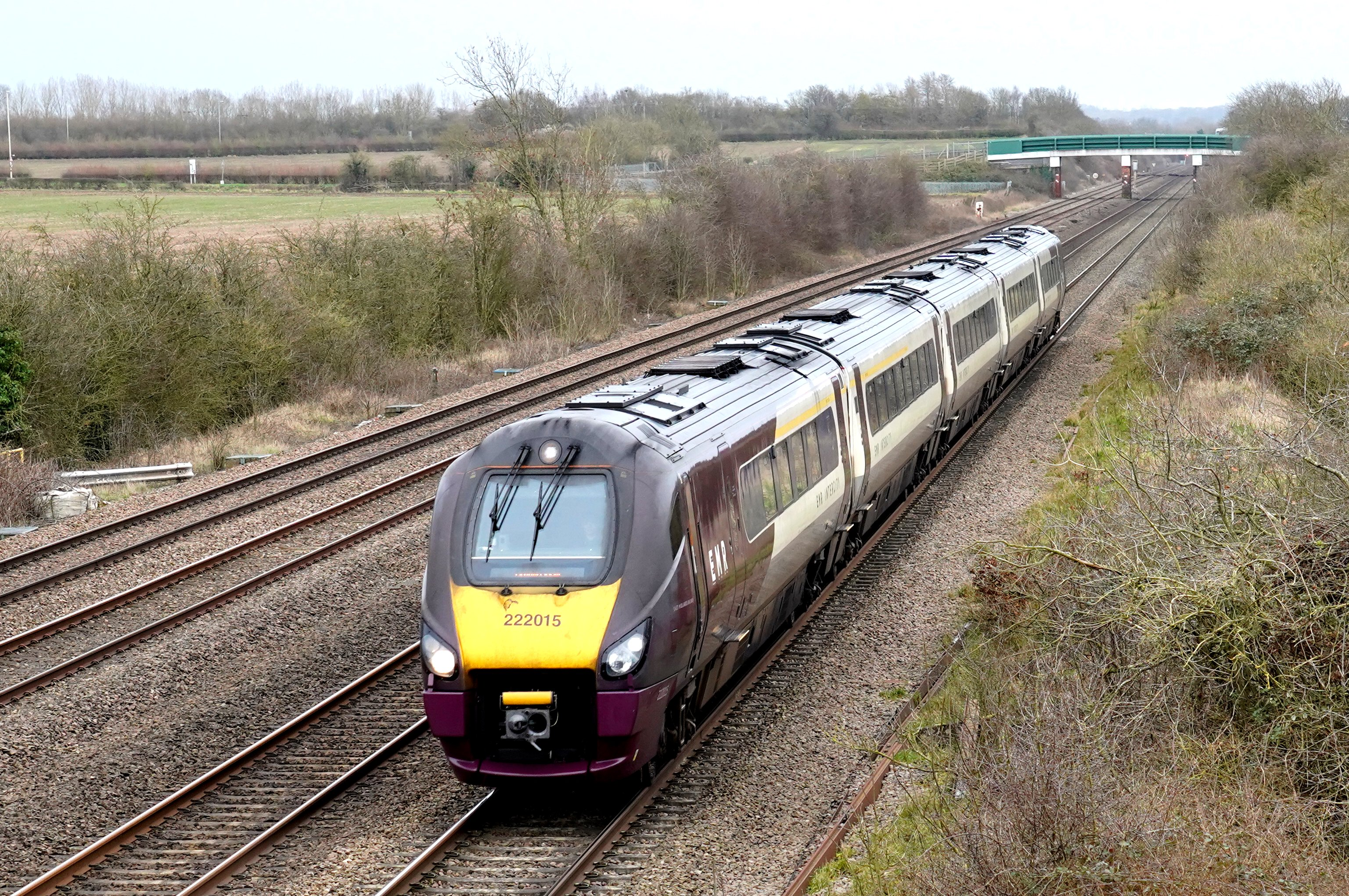
- East Midlands Railway Class 222 at Cossington

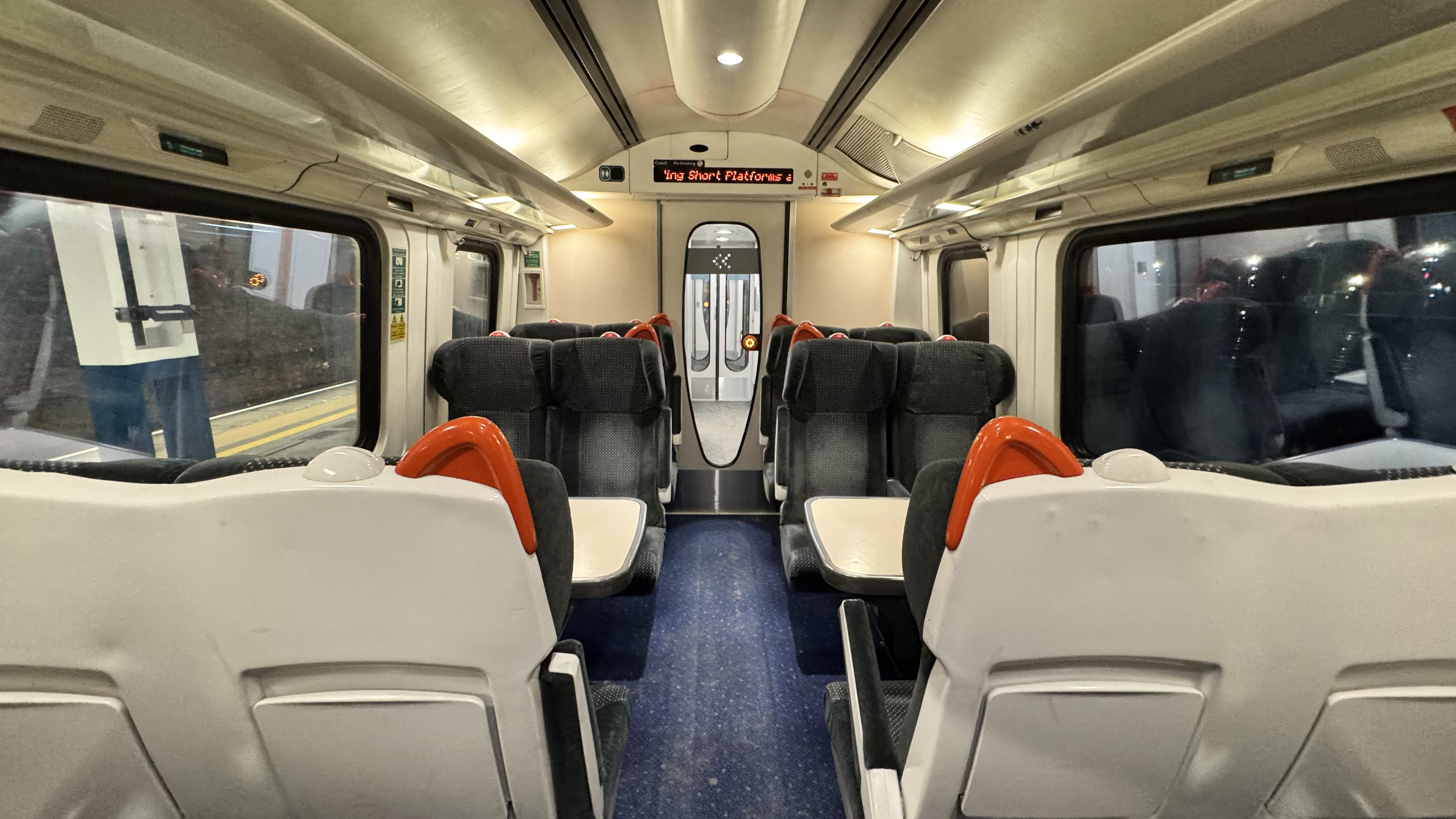
- Refreshed East Midlands Railway Standard Class interior
- In service: 31 May 2004 – present
- Manufacturer: Bombardier Transportation
- Built at: Bruges
- Family name: Voyager
- Replaced: InterCity 125; Class 170
- Constructed: 2003–2005
- Refurbished: 2011–2012; 2023–2024; 2026–present
- Number built: 27 sets
- Successor: Class 180 (Hull Trains); Class 810 (East Midlands Railway)
- Formation: 4 & 9-car sets (as built); 5 & 7-car sets (East Midlands Trains sets re-formation); 5, 6 & 7-car sets (present)
- Fleet numbers: 222006–222023; 222101–222104; 222601–222605
- Capacity: 250 seats (5-car formation); 360 seats (6-car formation); 354 seats (7-car formation)
- Owner: Eversholt Rail Group
- Operators: Current: East Midlands Railway; Lumo; Future: ScotRail; Former: Hull Trains; Midland Mainline
- Depots: Future: Central Rivers (Staffordshire); Haymarket (Roseburn); Polmadie (Glasgow); Inverness
- Lines served: Current: Midland Main Line; Oakham to Kettering Line; London Euston to Stirling; Future: Highland Main Line; Aberdeen–Inverness line; Glasgow Queen Street/Edinburgh Waverley to Aberdeen

Specifications
- Car body construction: Steel
- Car length: 23.85 m (78 ft 3 in) end cars; 22.82 m (74 ft 10 in) other
- Width: 2.73 m (8 ft 11 in)
- Wheel diameter: 780–716 mm (30.7–28.2 in) (maximum–minimum)
- Wheelbase: Bogies: 2.250 m (7 ft 4.6 in)
- Maximum speed: 125 mph (200 km/h)
- Traction system: One per car, Alstom alternator, 750v asynchronous ONIX IGBT drive with AGATE traction control
- Prime mover: Cummins QSK19-R (one per car)
- Engine type: Inline-6 turbo-diesel
- Displacement: 19 L (1,159 cu in) per engine
- Traction motors: Asynchronous (2 per car)
- Power output: 559 kW (750 hp) per engine at 1800 rpm
- Acceleration: 0.8 m/s^{2} (1.8 mph/s)
- UIC classification: 1A′A1′+1A′A1′+...+1A′A1′
- Bogies: Bombardier B5005
- Braking systems: Rheostatic and electro-pneumatic
- Safety systems: AWS, TPWS
- Coupling system: Dellner 12
- Multiple working: Within Class
- Track gauge: 4 ft 8 1/2 in (1,435 mm)

The British Rail Class 222 Meridian is a type of diesel-electric multiple-unit high-speed passenger train capable of 125 mph (200 km/h). Twenty-seven sets were built by Bombardier Transportation in Bruges, Belgium, from 2003 to 2005.

The Class 222 is part of the Bombardier Voyager family, bearing a similarity to the Class 220 Voyager and Class 221 Super Voyager trains currently operated by CrossCountry and Grand Central. Originally built for Midland Mainline and Hull Trains, today the class is operated by Lumo and East Midlands Railway who brand it Meridian.

== Details ==
All units are equipped with a Cummins QSK19 diesel engine beneath each car, producing 559 kW (750 hp) at 1,800 rpm. This powers a generator, also located beneath the cars, which supplies current to Alstom Onix 800 motors that drive two axles per coach. Approximately 1,350 miles (2,170 km) can be travelled between each refuelling.

The Class 222 utilises a rheostatic braking system alongside its air brake system, whereby power to the motors is disconnected, changing their function from motors to generators. The current produced is directed to resistors on the roof, where the electrical energy is dissipated as thermal energy. This therefore reduces wear on the brake shoes, extending their lifespan. During normal braking, the Class 222 can decelerate from 60 to 0 mph (97 to 0 km/h) in 400 m (440 yd). During emergency braking, the distance is reduced to 350 m (380 yd).

B5000 lightweight bogies were used, the same type as the Class 220 Voyager. The outside of the wheel is fully visible, as the supporting frame and bearings are located inboard.

The Class 222 is fitted with Dellner couplers, as on Class 220 Voyager and Class 221 Super Voyager trains, though these units cannot work in multiple unit during regular service, as the Class 222's electric systems are incompatible with those of the Voyager and Super Voyager. Additionally, the Dellner couplers allow Class 57 'Thunderbird' locomotives to couple and tow Class 222 sets in the case of an emergency.

== Operations ==
=== Midland region ===
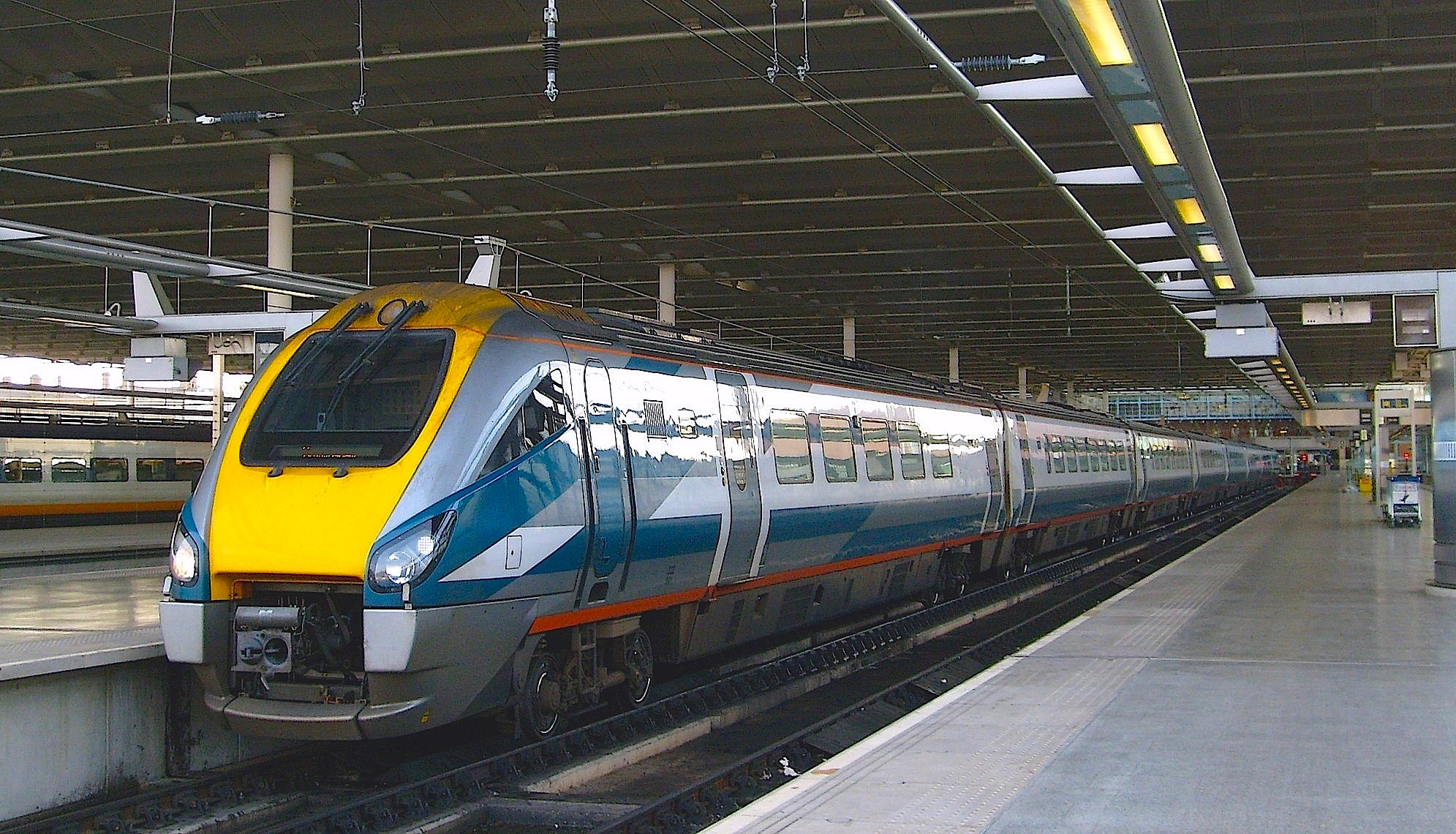
Midland Mainline Class 222 at London St Pancras in 2008

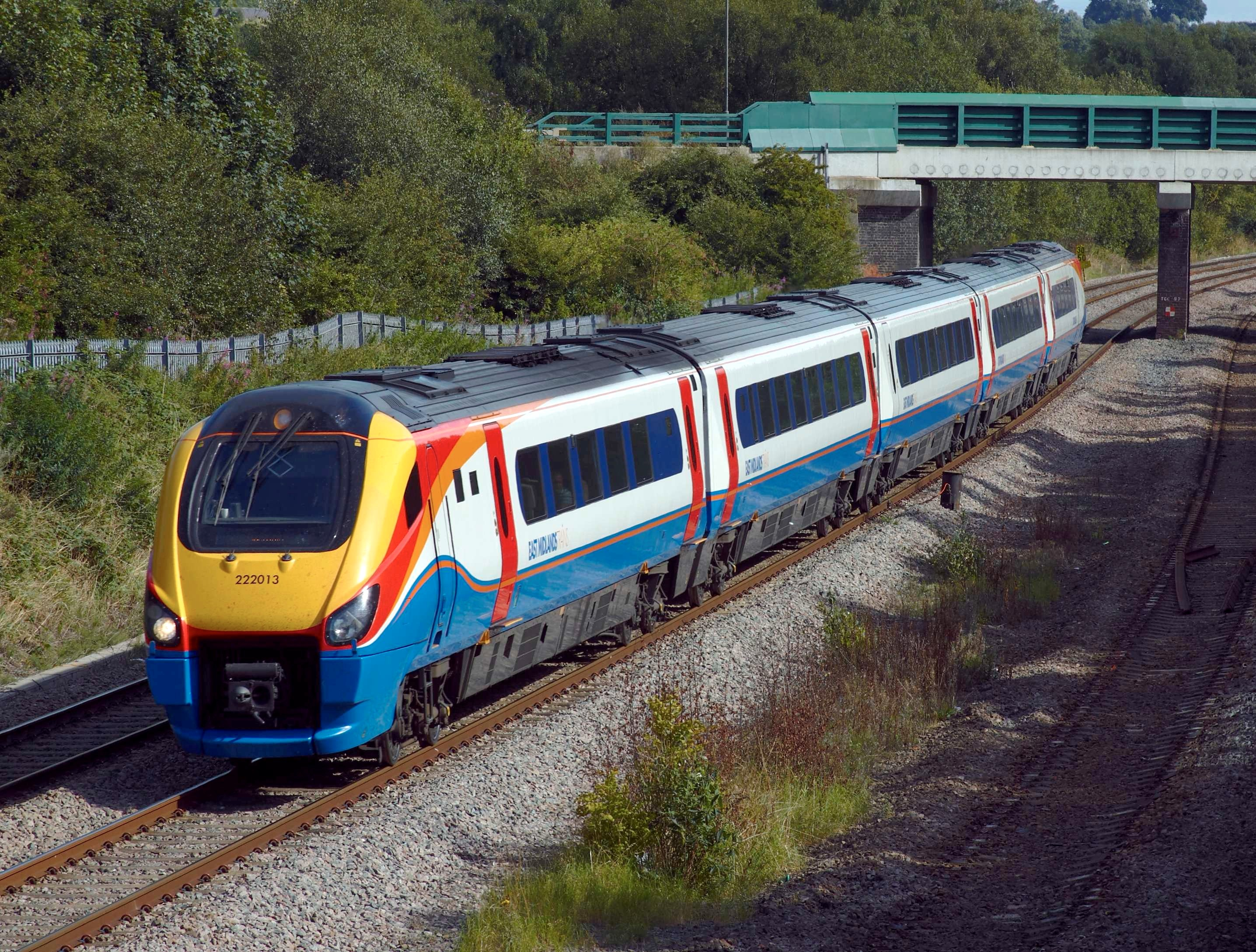
East Midlands Trains Class 222 near Clay Cross in 2009

With the exception of EMR Connect services, no route operated by East Midlands Railway is fully electrified. As a result, the majority of its fleet is composed of diesel trains such as the Class 222.

Midland Mainline introduced the first of 23 Class 222 units on 31 May 2004, branding them Meridian. These replaced all the Class 170 Turbostars and some of the High Speed Trains, having better acceleration than both of them. Initially, the 23 units ordered for Midland Mainline were four-car and nine-car. Over time these have been gradually modified to the current formations. The four-car units ordered by Hull Trains had an option when constructed to be extended to five cars if required.

Seven of the sets were nine-car Class 222 Meridians intended for an enhanced London St Pancras to Leeds service, but after the trains had been ordered, the Strategic Rail Authority decided not to allow them to run the service. The nine-car Meridians were used on London-Nottingham and some London-Sheffield services.

When the trains were ordered, Midland Mainline overestimated the number of first-class passengers, and the four-car Meridians had less standard-class seating than the three-car Turbostars they replaced. Coach D subsequently had a section of first-class seating declassified for use by standard-class passengers.

At the end of 2006, Midland Mainline removed a carriage from each of the nine-car sets and extended seven of the four-car sets, using the removed carriages.

Following the formation of the new East Midlands rail franchise in November 2007, the entire fleet of Class 222 Meridians was inherited by East Midlands Trains, which operated the expanded East Midlands rail franchise, including all routes previously run by Midland Mainline.

In 2008 further rearrangements were made to the sets: another carriage was removed from the eight-car Meridians, except for unit 222007, which was reduced to five cars with two of the first-class coaches converted to part standard and part first class. The surplus coaches were then added to the four-car Meridians. These changes, which took place from March to October 2008, resulted in six seven-car sets (222001–222006) and 17 five-car sets (222007–222023).

The seven-car trains are almost exclusively used on the fast services between London St Pancras and Sheffield. Since the retirement of the HSTs, they have commenced working London St Pancras to Leeds via Sheffield. The five-car trains are mainly used between London St Pancras and Sheffield, Nottingham or Corby on semi-fast services, and at off-peak times. The four-car trains supplement the five-car trains on these services, or can alternatively form standalone services.

In December 2008, the Class 222 Meridians started work on the hourly London St Pancras to Sheffield services, because they have faster acceleration than the High Speed Trains and so were able to reduce the Sheffield to London journey time by 12 minutes. The hourly Nottingham service was then transferred to High Speed Train running to cover for the Meridians now working the hourly Sheffield fast service.

In February 2009, units 222101 and 222102 transferred from Hull Trains to East Midlands Trains, and were quickly repainted in the East Midlands Trains white livery. Unit 222104 followed later in the year, and unit 222103 a further few months later after repairs had been completed: unit 222103 had been out of service for two years since early 2007, when the unit fell from jacks at Bombardier's Crofton works.

In August 2019, following the Department for Transport's awarding of the East Midlands franchise to Abellio, all of the 222 fleet transferred to new operator East Midlands Railway.

=== Hull services ===
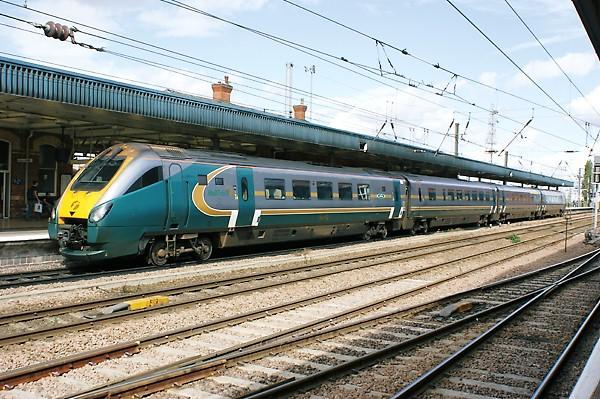
Hull Trains Class 222 at Doncaster in 2008

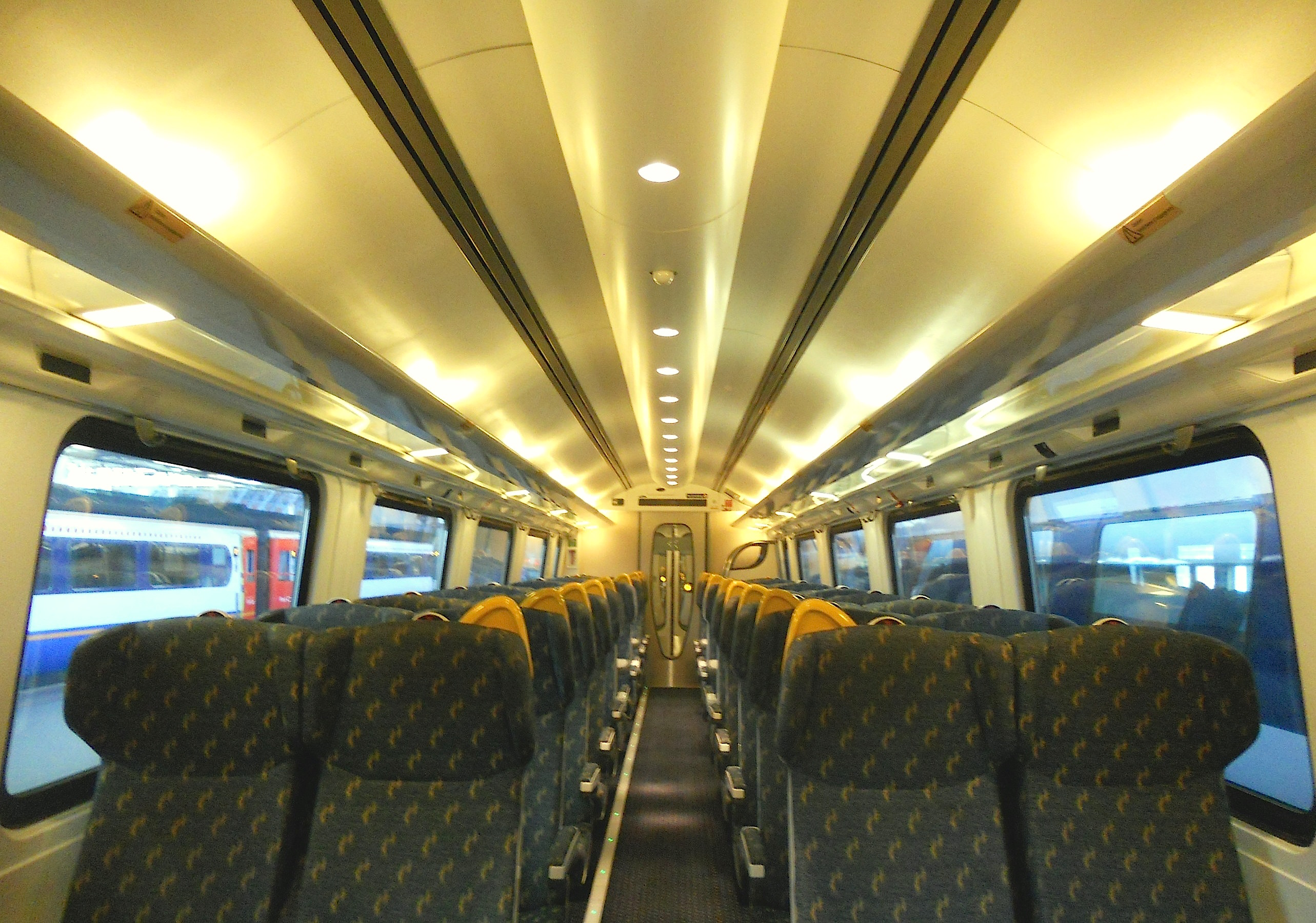
Hull Trains Standard Class interior

Hull Trains introduced Class 222 Pioneer units, to replace its Class 170 Turbostars in May 2005. The units reduced journey times between Hull and London King's Cross by up to 20 minutes. The Pioneers had a different interior colour scheme and less first-class seating than the Meridians.

First Hull Trains' fleet consisted of four four-car Pioneer units.

First Hull Trains decided to use only Class 180 units from 2009 onwards. The Class 222 units were transferred to East Midlands Trains in 2008/09 and are now branded Meridian.

=== Lumo ===
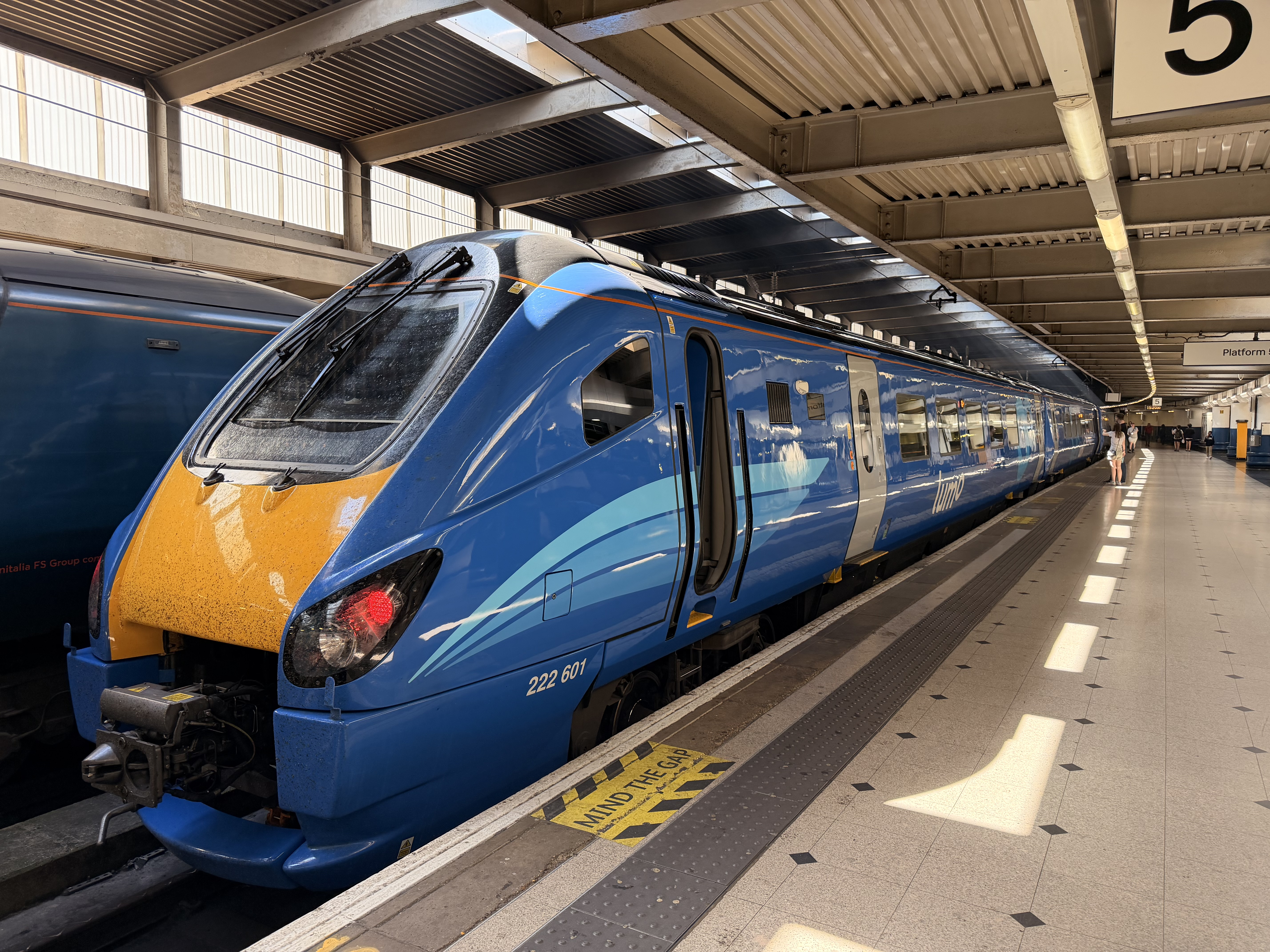
Lumo Class 222 at London Euston

In June 2025, Lumo announced that was going to lease 5 six-car Class 222 units. These are to operate a service between London Euston and Stirling, which was launched on 25 May 2026. As part of the refurbishment, and in line with other Lumo services, CCTV and train dispatch equipment was modified or installed to allow full driver only operation, without a traditional train guard.

== Future operations ==
All are scheduled to be returned to Eversholt Rail Group in the future once Class 810 units replace them entirely on EMR Intercity services.

On 19 March 2026, ScotRail announced it will lease twenty-two Class 222 units to replace the current HST fleet and will undergo an £80m overhaul and refurbishment programme, with the first train to enter service in late 2027.

== Former proposed operators ==
=== Enterprise ===
In 2005, HSBC Rail took delivery of the seven nine-car trains planned for use by Midland Mainline on its London-Leeds service, but the trains were left idle when the Strategic Rail Authority prevented Midland Mainline from operating this service. HSBC Rail made contact with Northern Ireland Railways and Iarnród Éireann, with a view to their leasing these units for use by Enterprise. Using these trains on the Belfast-Dublin line was one of a number of options, which also included the purchase of additional 22000 Class railcars or cascaded coaching stock. In the event, the trains entered service with MML providing the fast services from London to Nottingham, thus releasing High Speed Trains.

=== Grand Central ===
Grand Central, on the announcement of its open-access operation to Sunderland in the summer of 2006, planned to run its services using five Class 222 units, with the intention of starting by the end of that year. However, this never happened, pushing back the planned start date while the company looked for alternatives. Grand Central finally started operating in December 2007 using three High Speed Trains.

== Refurbishment ==
East Midlands Trains refurbished its entire Class 222 fleet. The refurbishment included new seat covers and carpets in standard class. First class received new leather seat covers along with a new colour scheme and carpets. The refurbishment started in February 2011 and was complete by spring 2012.

In 2024, East Midlands Railway began a refurbishment programme on its entire Class 222 fleet, the programme mainly involved the refurbishment of the seating in standard class.

Beginning in 2026, Lumo commenced a refurbishment of their five-strong fleet. This included reforming five- and seven-car sets into six-car sets, and converting former first class carriages into standard carriages. This refurbishment also included the addition of driver only operation equipment to allow the trains to fit Lumo's operating requirements.

== Accidents and incidents ==
- On 10 June 2006, unit 222009 working 1D17 10:30 London to Sheffield had to be taken out of service due to a door being discovered open at Desborough, Northamptonshire whilst at speed. The Rail Accident Investigation Branch (RAIB) report determined that the incident was probably caused by a sequence of events which would not have been possible with a traditional manually operated mechanical door: a combination of a piece of dirt incorporated in the door lock switch during manufacture and a software bug in the door control system allowed the door to remain unlocked after the train called at Luton, but prevented this condition being detected. Deflation and inflation of the pneumatic door seals, initiated automatically by detectors responding to the train stopping and starting at subsequent stations, then gradually prised the door out of its socket until at a point north of Kettering it became able to open. This condition was detected and an automatic brake application initiated, whereupon the inertial forces caused the door to slide open fully; however the indications presented in the driver's cab were ambiguous and were interpreted as caused by faulty systems, and he, therefore, cancelled the brake application. The train was finally halted at Desborough summit after a passenger reported that the door was open.
- On 20 February 2010, unit 222005 working 1F45 14:55 London to Sheffield derailed near East Langton, Leicestershire. Two wheels on Coach E in the middle of the train came off the track; on approaching the site of the derailment the train was travelling at close to 100 mph (160 km/h). No other wheels derailed and the train remained upright. There were also reports that one or more road vehicles on an adjacent highway were struck and damaged by debris as the derailed train passed. 222005 was moved from the site the next day after a replacement bogie was fitted and was for a few months formed of vehicles of 222101 and 222022 including a standard class cab end which was temporarily renumbered until the damaged vehicles were returned to the set in mid-June. The derailment caused damage to the Midland Main Line near Kibworth for a distance of two miles, the line underwent emergency repairs by Network Rail to get the stretch of line back open for start of service on 24 February 2010. The RAIB investigated the incident and found that it was caused by a complete fracture of the axle, due to a bearing stiffening to the point where it would no longer rotate properly. The RAIB recommended that a review of gearbox and axle design be undertaken, and that the Class 222 and similar classes' final drive oil sampling regime be improved.
- On 20 April 2012, at 08:44, an East Midlands Trains Class 222 unit pulled into Nottingham station where both the driver and station staff noticed smoke coming from underneath one of the carriages. The engine underneath the carriage had caught fire from overheating – which occurred due to day-to-day grime which had built up underneath the train and then been heated up by the movement of the wheels. Both the train and the station were evacuated, but there were no injuries.
- On 14 February 2016, unit 222005 was in collision with a conveyor boom left foul of the line at Barrow-upon-Soar, Leicestershire. The lead vehicle suffered substantial damage and the driver was shaken but uninjured. No injuries were reported amongst the 85 passengers, although a fitter working on the boom was severely injured. The RAIB determined that poorly maintained electrical components on the wagon conveyor boom caused the boom to rotate further than intended, leaving it fouling the main line.

== Fleet details ==
Class	Operator	Quantity	Year built	Cars per unit
222/0	East Midlands Railway	18	2003–2005	5
222/1	East Midlands Railway	4	2003–2005	5
222/6	Lumo	5	2003–2005	6

=== Named units ===
The following Meridians have been named:

Unit number	Name	Date named	Notes
222001	The Entrepreneurs Express (de-named)	October 2011	
222002	The Cutlers' Company (de-named)	October 2011	
222003	Tornado (de-named)	March 2009	Driving car 60163 named as it has the same number as Tornado
222004	Children's Hospital Sheffield (de-named) (formerly City of Sheffield)	February 2013 as Children's Hospital Sheffield, March 2007 as City of Sheffield	
222005	City of Nottingham (de-named)	February 2007	
222006	The Carbon Cutter (formerly Leicester)	May 2011 as The Carbon Cutter, March 2007 as City of Leicester	
222007	City of Derby (de-named)	May 2007	
222008	Derby Etches Park	September 2009	Named after Derby Etches Park depot
222011	Sheffield City Battalion 1914-1918 (de-named)	November 2014	
222015	175 Years of Derby's Railways 1839-2014	November 2014	
222017	Lions Club International Centenary 1917-2017 (de-named)		To mark the centenary of Lions Club International
222022	Invest in Nottingham	September 2011	
222023	Spirt of Derby (de-named)		
222101	Professor George Gray (de-named)	June 2005	
222102	Professor Stuart Palmer (de-named)	June 2005	
222103	Dr John Godber (de-named)	September 2005	
222104	Sir Terry Farrell (de-named)	September 2005	
