= Sinfin Central railway station =

Former railway station in Derbyshire, England

Coordinates: 52°53′15″N 1°28′11″W

Sinfin Central
- Current view of the station

General information
- Location: Sinfin, City of Derby; England
- Platforms: 1

Other information
- Status: Disused

History
- Original company: London Midland Region of British Railways

Key dates
- 4 October 1976: Opened
- 17 May 1993: Last train
- 21 May 1998: Official closure
Location

Sinfin Central railway station served the suburb of Sinfin in the city of Derby, Derbyshire, England.

== History ==
The station was originally a stop on the former line between Derby and Ashby de la Zouch, which closed in 1930.

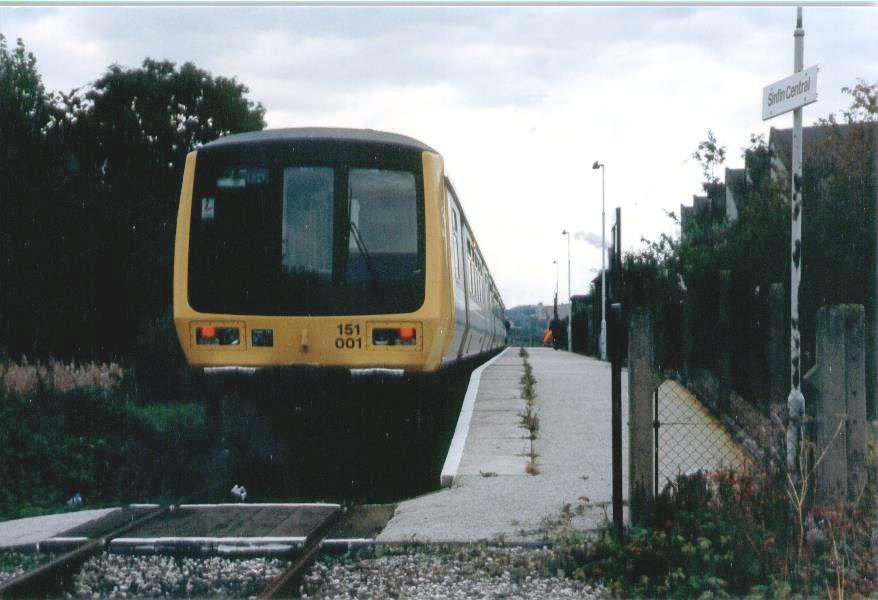
Sinfin Central railway station, Derby, 1986

On 4 October 1976, a new unstaffed passenger station was opened by British Rail to serve the nearby Rolls-Royce factory. Despite Derby City Council's efforts to encourage usage of public transport, basing it on the Cross-City Line in Birmingham, the service was very underused.

The service was reduced to one return train per day in 1992, with the return journey departing at 06:57. The service did not run at weekends and there was no evening return. This ran until 1993, when the Derwent Valley Line, which interworked with the Sinfin branch, changed to using Class 150 Sprinter diesel multiple units; Sprinters were not permitted on the branch because of compatibility issues with the obsolete low-voltage track circuits used on the line. The last train ran on 17 May 1993 and it was replaced with a taxi service.

On 2 May 1997, the line became part of the Central Trains franchise, as part of the privatisation of British Rail, but none of its trains ever stopped at the station. On 6 November 1997, Central Trains and the Director of Passenger Rail Franchising proposed the closure of the line. It was granted on 21 May 1998 by Rail Regulator John Swift QC. During the final year, there were three regular users of the taxi at a single fare of £1.20.

Unlike Sinfin North, Sinfin Central had public access with a 360-yard (330 m) long footpath from Wilmore Road. However, gated barriers were installed in 2023, preventing anyone who is not a Rolls-Royce employee from reaching the station.

Preceding station	Disused railways	Following station
Sinfin North	Central Trains; Sinfin branch line	Terminus
