= 1976 in rail transport =

This article lists events related to rail transport that occurred in 1976.

== Events ==
=== March events ===
- March 27 - The first section, 4.6 miles (7.4 km), of the Washington Metro, the elevated, ground, and subway system in Washington, D.C., opens.
- March 31 - The Sallins Train Robbery takes place on CIÉ when a Cork to Dublin mail train is robbed near Sallins in County Kildare, Ireland, and around IR£200,000 stolen.

=== April events ===
- April 1 - Conrail is formed by an act of United States Congress merging the Central Railroad of New Jersey, Erie Lackawanna Railroad, Lehigh and Hudson River Railway, Lehigh Valley Railroad, Penn Central and Reading Company into the new Consolidated Railway Corporation. Through this "forced merger", hundreds of miles of trackage in the North East were abandoned between 1976 and 1980.
- April 9 - The EMD F40PH diesel locomotive enters revenue service with Amtrak.

=== May events ===
- May 4 - An international train collides with a local train near Schiedam, the Netherlands, killing 24 and injuring 11.
- May 6 - In Tokyo, Japan, an extension of Line 6 (currently the Mita Line) opens from Takashimadaira Station to Nishi-Takashimadaira Station.

=== June events ===
- June 1 - Opening of Belgrade–Bar railway through the Balkans, 476 km (296 mi) long, with 254 tunnels totalling 114 km (71 mi) and over 435 bridges including Mala Rijeka Viaduct, 198 m (650 ft) above ground level, the world's tallest. The latter lies near the summit at Kolašin, 1,032 m (3,386 ft) AMSL.
- June 10 - The Tozai Subway Line in Sapporo, Japan, opens between Kotoni and Shiroishi.
- June 15 - Amtrak introduces the Palmetto.
- June 21 - First section of Charleroi Light Metro opens in Belgium.

=== October events ===
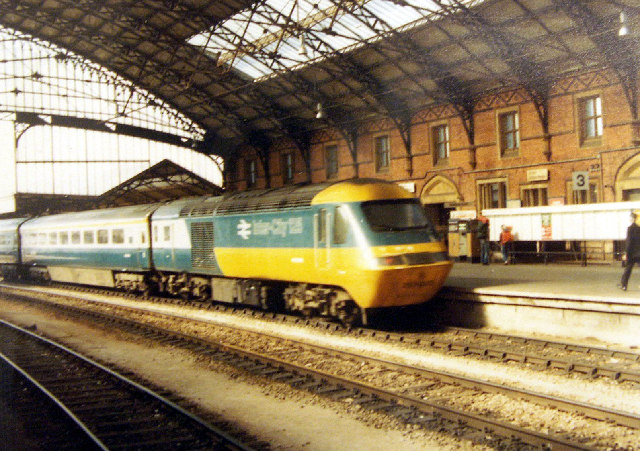
InterCity 125

- October 4
  - The InterCity 125 high-speed train is introduced into passenger service on British Rail, initially between London Paddington station, Bristol Temple Meads and south Wales; the units will still be in front-line service 40 years later.
  - The Sinfin Branch Line from Derby to Sinfin, England, opens for passengers to carry workers to and from the Rolls-Royce plant.
- October 6 – The 2400-series cars (2401–2600), built by Boeing-Vertol of Ridley Park, Pennsylvania, are placed in service on the Chicago "L" system. The 2400-series cars are the first rail transit order built by Boeing (an aircraft manufacturer) and the first rapid transit cars in Chicago to have sliding doors (2-pair on each side). The previous 2200 series, 2000 series and 6000 series have blinker doors.
- October 31 – Canadian Pacific Railway and Canadian National Railway issue the first joint Via Rail timetable.

=== December events ===
- December 26 - The second American Freedom Train tour ends in Miami. See also American Freedom Train – 1975–76 station stops.

=== Unknown date events ===
- Many of the major American railroads paint some of their diesel locomotives in red, white and blue paint schemes in celebration of the United States Bicentennial
- Former Southern Pacific Railroad GS-4 class 4-8-4 number 4449 is painted in a special red, white and blue paint scheme and tours the United States as the power for the American Freedom Train.
- Denman McNear succeeds Benjamin Biaggini as president of the Southern Pacific Company, parent company of the Southern Pacific Railroad.
- Benjamin Biaggini assumes the position of chairman of the Board of Directors of the Southern Pacific Company, a position that has been vacant since Donald Russell's departure in 1972.
- General Motors Electro-Motive Division introduces the EMD F40PH.
- Work begins to restore Southern Pacific 4-6-2 number 2472 to operating condition after almost 20 years of static display.
- The 10 series debuts on the Midosuji Line in Osaka, Japan.

== Deaths ==
=== July deaths ===
- July 4 - Fred Gurley, president of Atchison, Topeka and Santa Fe Railway 1944-1957 (b. 1889).
- July 15 - William C. Coleman, president of Monon Railroad, (b. 1901).

=== October deaths ===
- October 4 - Henry G. Ivatt, Chief Mechanical Engineer of the London, Midland and Scottish Railway (b. 1886).

=== Unknown date deaths ===
- John W. Barriger III, president of the Monon Railroad 1946–1953, Pittsburgh and Lake Erie Railroad 1954–1964, Missouri–Kansas–Texas Railroad 1965–1970 and the Boston and Maine Railroad 1973–1974 (b. 1899).
