= Wilson, Leicestershire =

Hamlet in Leicestershire, England

Coordinates: 52.81743°N 1.40199°W

Wilson
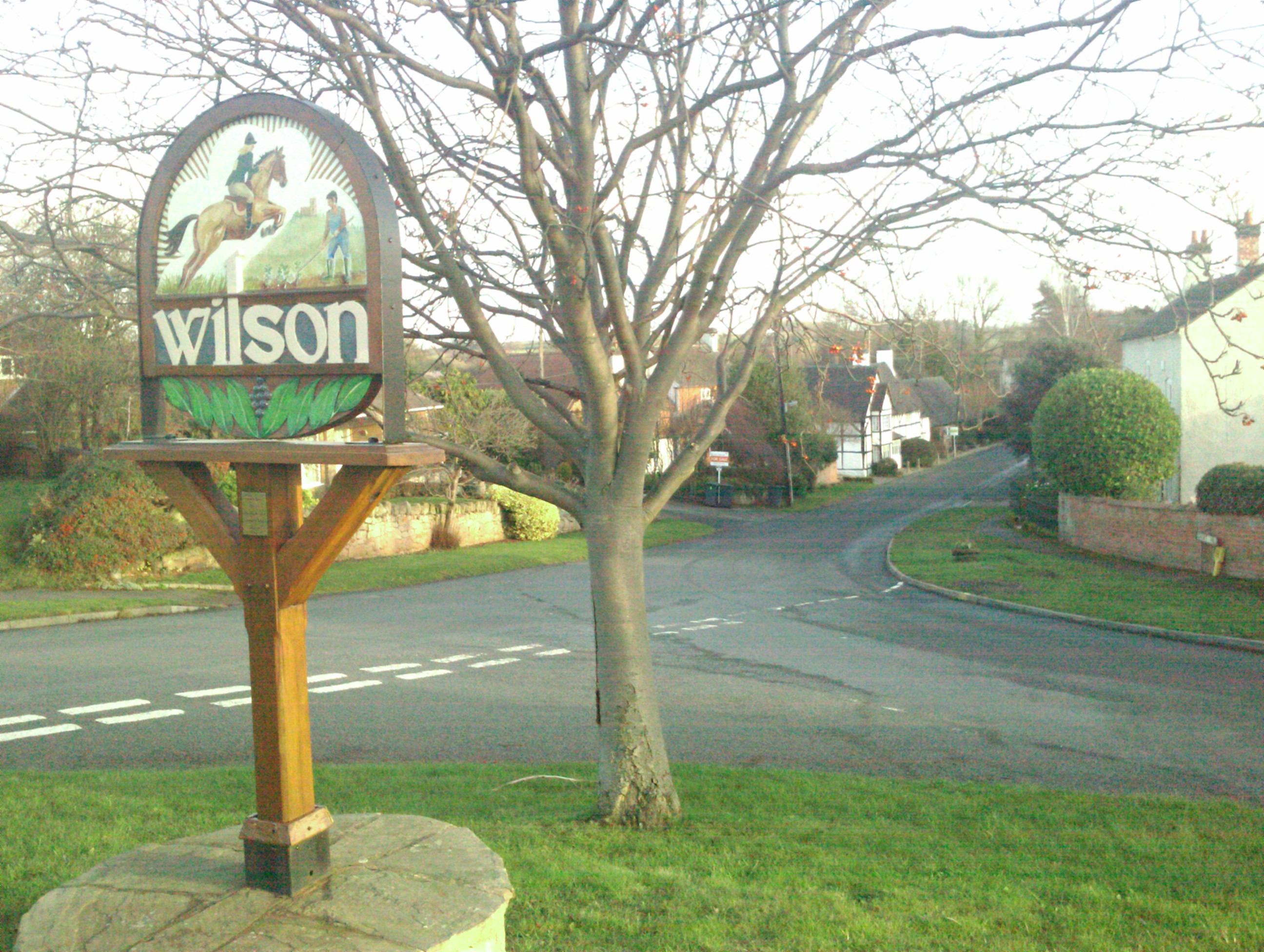

- Location within Leicestershire
- Civil parish: Breedon on the Hill
- District: North West Leicestershire
- Shire county: Leicestershire
- Region: East Midlands
- Country: England
- Sovereign state: United Kingdom
- Post town: Derby
- Postcode district: DE73
- Police: Leicestershire
- Fire: Leicestershire
- Ambulance: East Midlands
- UK Parliament: North West Leicestershire

Wilson, is a hamlet just in the North West Leicestershire district of Leicestershire, England. Close to East Midlands Airport, Wilson retains many 'village-like' features. It has one pub, the Bulls Head. Wilson has no amenities, only a gym and swimming pool. Its name is first recorded in the 12th century as Wiuelestunia and likely came from Anglo-Saxon Wifeles tūn = "Wifel's farmstead or village". In 1870-72 it had a population of 177.

Wilson railway station opened on 1 October 1869 on the Midland Railway extension of the Melbourne Line from Melbourne to Worthington. It closed in June 1871.

== Governance ==
Wilson is part of the civil parish of Breedon on the Hill.
