= Chellaston and Swarkestone railway station =

Former railway station in Derbyshire, England

Chellaston and Swarkestone

General information
- Location: Chellaston, City of Derby; England
- Coordinates: 52.8666°N 1.4436°W
- Grid reference: SK3755330047
- Platforms: 2

Other information
- Status: Disused

History
- Original company: Midland Railway
- Pre-grouping: Midland Railway
- Post-grouping: London, Midland and Scottish Railway

Key dates
- 1 September 1868: Station opened as Chellaston
- 13 June 1901: Renamed Chellaston and Swarkestone
- 1930: Passenger service withdrawn
- 1966?: Line closed to freight traffic
Location

Chellaston and Swarkestone railway station was a station at Chellaston in Derbyshire, England.

== History ==
It was opened in 1868 as part of the Midland Railway branch from Derby Midland to Melbourne.

It was originally known as Chellaston, but on 13 June 1901 the Midland Railway renamed it Chellaston and Swarkestone.

The London, Midland and Scottish Railway withdrew passenger services in 1930 and British Railways closed the line in about 1966.

== Services ==
Preceding station	Disused railways	Following station
Melbourne; Line and station closed	Midland Railway; Melbourne line	Peartree; Line and station open
