= Sinfin North railway station =

Former railway station in Derby, England

Coordinates: 52°53′34″N 1°28′33″W

Sinfin North

General information
- Location: Sinfin, City of Derby; England
- Platforms: 1

Other information
- Status: Disused

History
- Original company: London Midland Region of British Railways

Key dates
- 4 October 1976: Opened
- 17 May 1993: Closed
Location

Sinfin North Station was a railway station on the Sinfin branch in Derby, England. It opened on 4 October 1976 and closed on 17 May 1993. The station was built by British Rail. After closure, a service was provided by a taxi until 1998.

The station had one platform and was not publicly accessible, due to being located between works sites.

In 2007 the platform was in a poor condition, and a clause in the decision approving closure required that the platform could not be demolished until after 21 May 2008 in case of any operator wishing to reopen it. The platform is still in place although the current operator East Midlands Railway has no plans to reopen the branch.

Preceding station	Disused railways	Following station
Peartree	Central Trains; Sinfin branch line	Sinfin Central
