= Ramsline Halt railway station =

Former railway station in Derby, England

Ramsline Halt
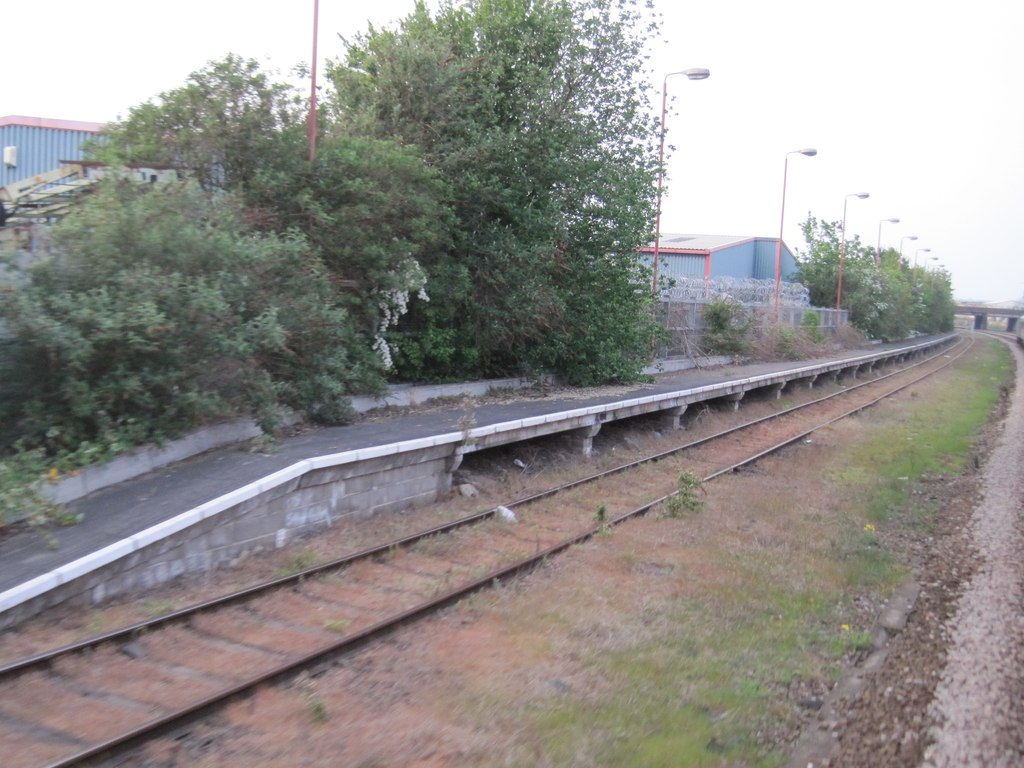
- Station in 2011.

General information
- Location: Pear Tree, City of Derby; England
- Coordinates: 52.9049°N 1.4654°W
- Grid reference: SK360343
- Platforms: 1

Other information
- Status: Disused

History
- Original company: British Rail

Key dates
- 20 January 1990: Station opened
- 1997: Closed
Location

Ramsline Halt is a disused single-platform railway station in the Pear Tree area of Derby, England. It was opened by British Rail in 1990 to serve football specials bringing away supporters to the Baseball Ground, then the home stadium of Derby County F.C. The station cost £320,000 to build, partly funded by the Football Trust, but only four trains ever stopped there. In 1997 Derby County moved to the new Pride Park Stadium and Ramsline Halt closed. In spite of this, it remains in reasonable condition. There is no current access to it, but it can be seen from Osmaston Road. The station name board is now at the National Football Museum.

The purpose of the station was to prevent crowd trouble and aid policing by keeping visiting supporters away from the main Derby station, the city centre and residential areas.

The station was on a freight-only loop to the west of the main Derby-Birmingham line, between Derby and Peartree.

Preceding station	Disused railways	Following station
Derby	Regional Railways; Football Specials	Terminus
