= Wilson railway station =

Former railway station in Leicestershire, England

Wilson

General information
- Location: Wilson, North West Leicestershire; England
- Coordinates: 52.819415°N 1.397042°W

Other information
- Status: Disused

History
- Original company: Midland Railway

Key dates
- 1 October 1869: Line opened
- June 1871: Station closed
Location

Wilson railway station was a short-lived station at Wilson, Leicestershire, England.

== History ==
It was opened on 1 October 1869 by the Midland Railway on an extension of the Melbourne Line from Melbourne to Worthington. It closed in June 1871.

== Stationmaster ==
- John Wickens ca. 1871

== Route ==
Preceding station	Disused railways	Following station
Tonge and Breedon; Line and station closed	Midland Railway; Melbourne line	Melbourne; Line and station closed
