= Breedon on the Hill =

Village in Leicestershire, England

Coordinates: 52.802°N 1.399°W

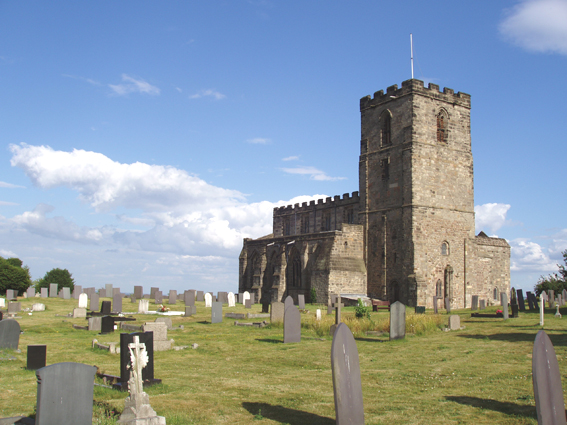
- Priory church of St. Mary & St. Hardulph

- Location within Leicestershire
- Population: 958 (2001 Census)
- OS grid reference: SK4022
- Civil parish: Breedon on the Hill
- District: North West Leicestershire
- Shire county: Leicestershire
- Region: East Midlands
- Country: England
- Sovereign state: United Kingdom
- Post town: DERBY
- Postcode district: DE73
- Dialling code: 01332
- Police: Leicestershire
- Fire: Leicestershire
- Ambulance: East Midlands
- UK Parliament: North West Leicestershire
- Website: Breedon on the Hill parish council

Breedon on the Hill is a village and civil parish about 5 miles (8 km) north of Ashby-de-la-Zouch in North West Leicestershire, England. The parish adjoins the Derbyshire county boundary and the village is only about 2 miles (3 km) south of the Derbyshire town of Melbourne. The 2001 Census recorded a parish population (including Isley and Wilson) of 958 people in 404 households. The parish includes the hamlets of Tonge 1 mile (1.6 km) east of the village and Wilson 1.3 miles (2 km) north of the village on the county boundary. The population at the 2011 census (including Isley cum Langley and Langley Priory) was 1,029 in 450 households.

== Geography ==
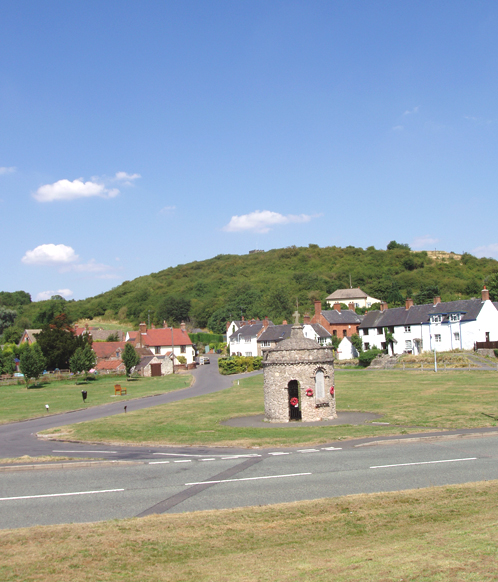
Breedon's limestone hill rising above the village green and war memorial

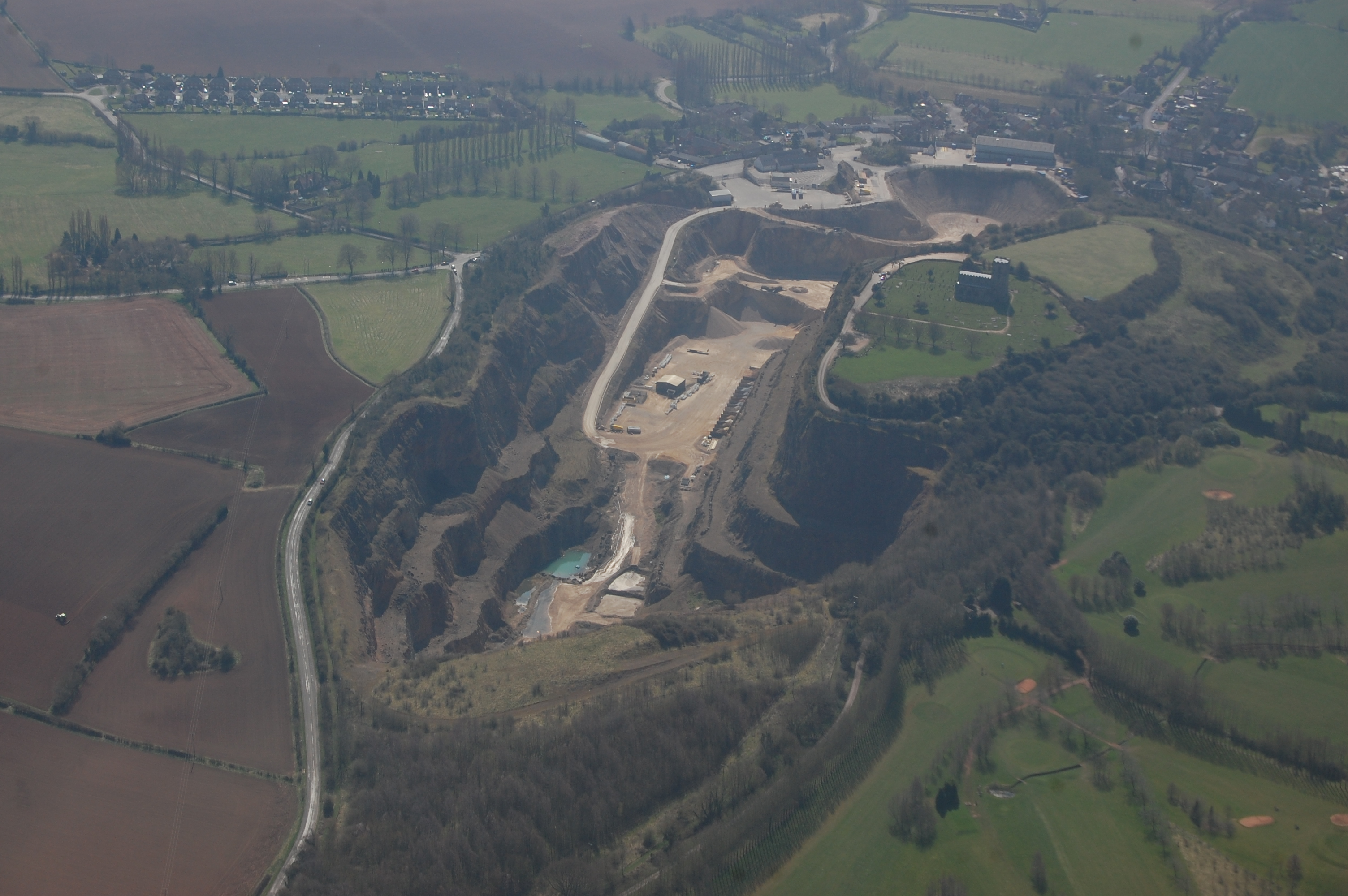
Aerial view, showing church and quarry

Breedon is notable for its Carboniferous limestone hill that rises 122 metres (400 ft) above sea level in a generally low-lying landscape and affords distant views across several counties. A large portion of the hill has been cut away by an active quarry now operated by the Breedon Group. This currently produces limestone and gravel. It has also produced sand.

On top of the hill is The Bulwarks Iron Age hill fort, within which is Breedon's historic Church of England parish church. A recent survey found considerable evidence of occupation within the southern part of the hillfort enclosure.

Breedon is 3 miles (5 km) from East Midlands Airport and 5 miles (8 km) from the junction of the A42 road and M1 motorway. The village is 3 miles (5 km) from the River Trent, and 2 miles (3 km) from Donington Park motor circuit.

== Etymology ==
The name Breedon is first attested in Bede's Ecclesiastical History of the English People of 731, in the form Briudun and Breadun. Here the name refers to the settlement now known as Breedon, but the settlement evidently took its name from the hill on which it stands, which must once simply have been called Breedon: the first element of the name derives from Brittonic *breɣ ("hill"). This word, whose literal meaning was presumably not understood by Old English-speakers, was borrowed into Old English as a name for the hill, with the addition for clarification of the Old English word dūn (also meaning "hill"). When the word dūn ceased to be understood to mean "hill", and perhaps also to distinguish the settlement from this hill on which it stood, the element on the Hill was added; the form Breedon on the Hill is first attested in 1610. Thus the name is, in terms of its etymological meanings, triply tautologous.

== History ==
Excavation of The Bulwarks in 1946 identified occupation between about the 1st century BC and about 1st century AD.

Medieval hagiography manuscripts record four saints buried in Breedon on the Hill. They are Friduricus, donor of the Mercian royal monastery built in Breedon during the seventh century, King Eardwulf of Northumbria, and relatively unknown Anglo-Saxon Saints Beonna of Breedon and Cotta of Breedon.

Breedon has a circular stone-built village lock-up with an adjoining animal pound. The lock-up is 18th-century and similar to the one in the nearby Worthington. It was used for detaining local drunks, and the adjoining pound for straying livestock. The lock-up and pound together comprise a Grade II listed building.

Breedon Hall is an historic building which was the ancestral home of the Curzon family.

In 1874, a branch of the Midland Railway was built through the eastern part of the parish and Tonge and Breedon railway station was built at Tonge. In 1980 British Rail closed the line and later the track was dismantled. The trackbed through the parish is now part of National Cycle Route 6.

== Breedon Priory Church ==
The Priory Church of St Mary and St Hardulph was originally a monastery founded in about AD 676 on the site of The Bulwarks, an Iron Age hill fort. It was re-founded as an Augustinian priory early in the 12th century. Before becoming a monastery it was a hermitage.

In 1498 members of the visiting Battenberg family took mass at the church on a number of occasions.

What remains of the priory church includes a large number of Anglo-Saxon sculptures, an ornate family box pew and notable Renaissance church monuments.

== Amenities ==
Breedon has two pubs: the Holly Bush and the Three Horseshoes. There was a third pub, The Lime Kiln, but this is now a private home.

The village has a small primary school and a post office. It did have a butcher's shop, but that closed in 2017. The school, St Hardulph's Church of England Primary School, was built in 1962 and also housed community facilities. Relations between the school, Leicestershire County Council and the local community association subsequently broke down and the community association was unsuccessful in a high court application arguing that they had the right to use the facilities on the grounds that the community had contributed some of the funding for the construction of the building.

Breedon has a football club, Breedon F.C.

== Sources ==
- Hoskins, W.G.; McKinley, R.A., eds. (1951). "The Priory of Breedon". A History of the County of Leicestershire, Volume 2. Victoria County History. pp. 8–10.
- Pevsner, Nikolaus (1960). Leicestershire and Rutland. The Buildings of England. Harmondsworth: Penguin Books. pp. 71–75.
