= Melbourne line =

Coordinates: 52.829°N 1.415°W

Melbourne Line
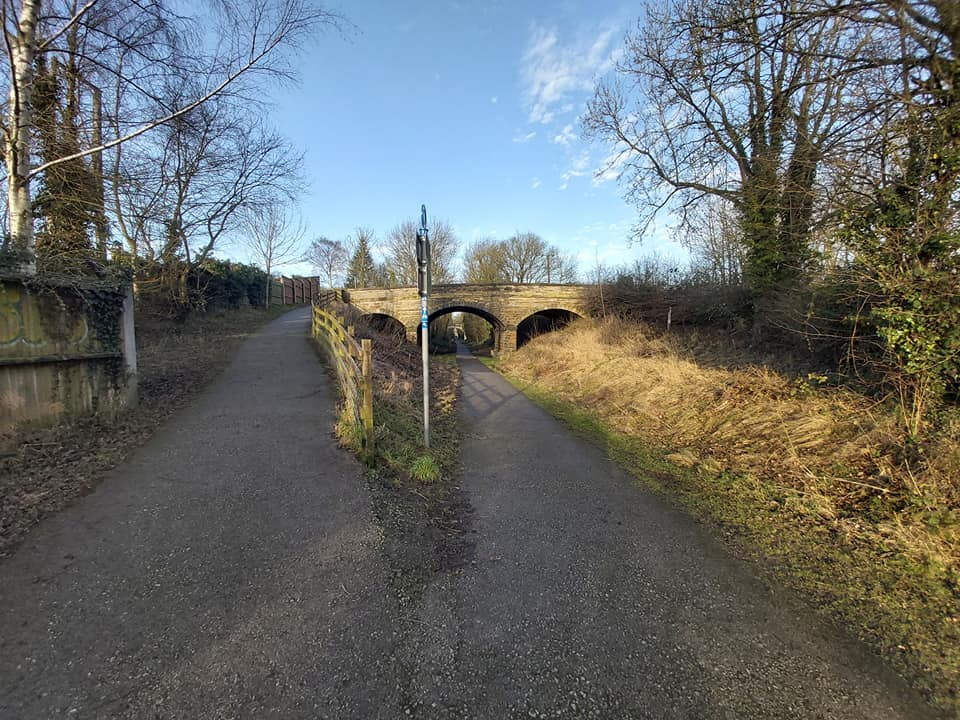

Overview
- Owner: LMS (during military use)
- Locale: Derbyshire, Leicestershire
- Stations: Worthington, Tonge and Breedon, Melbourne

Service
- Operator(s): War Department
- Depot(s): Melbourne

History
- Opened: 1868 (Derby Midland – Melbourne), 1874 (Melbourne – Ashby-de-la-Zouch), 1939 (as military railway)
- Closed: 1945 (as military railway), 1980 (as civilian railway)

Technical
- Track gauge: 1,435 mm (4 ft 8 1/2 in)

Buffer stops by Isley Walton Road

The Melbourne Line was a railway line which ran from Derby to Ashby de la Zouch. It was used by the British Army and Allied engineers during the Second World War from 1939 until late 1944 to prepare them for the invasion of mainland Europe. Engineers practised the demolition and rebuilding of railways and the running and maintenance of a railway line and its rolling stock. There was also a bridge building school at Kings Newton.

== Location ==
The section used by the military was between junctions near Ashby-de-la-Zouch in Leicestershire and Chellaston and Swarkestone in Derbyshire. Its principal station was Melbourne, which was actually at the hamlet of Kings Newton. Troops camped mainly at Weston-on-Trent from 1940. A suspension bridge linked the camp with Kings Newton over the Trent.

== Use as a military railway ==
=== Background ===
In the early stages of the War it was soon realised that the military railway at Longmoor would have to be expanded if the capacity to train the necessary railway personnel was to be met.

A second training establishment was sought. Derby Midland was a major railway centre and the London, Midland and Scottish Railway (LMS) staff college there was about to close and its Principal, Colonel Lionel Manton recommended the nearby rural freight line between Derby and Ashby de la Zouch be used as a training line. On 19 November 1939 the section of the line from Chellaston East Junction to the Smisby Road crossing, just north of Ashby, was handed over to the War Department. It was named the No. 2 Railway Training Centre (No. 1 being at Longmoor).

The line was named the Melbourne Military Railway after its principal station. Immediately south of Chellaston East Junction the railway established its headquarters, consisting of workshops, offices, and engine sheds for eight locomotives. After the war this area became a wagon repair depot. At Kings Newton miles of sidings were built.

Six locomotives of Midland Railway origin, by then LMS class 1F 0-6-0T, were requisitioned by the War Department from 1940 to the end of 1944 to work all traffic on this branch - one being replaced during the war - and others were taken on loan for periods of time including one diesel shunter. One of the 1F locomotives, LMS 1708, has been preserved as the only survivor of its class.

Initially the railway was to be used for individual training but later it was used for training complete railway operating companies who would work the line for a week at a time. Two such companies were Canadian. From July 1941 the Melbourne training regime was linked with that at Longmoor. Basic training took place in Hampshire before transfer to Melbourne where railway engineers undertook eight weeks training and construction engineers undertook 16 weeks training, which included eight weeks at the Kings Newton bridge building school. By the end of 1944 the additional facilities were no longer needed and the line was ready to hand back to the LMS.

On 11 July 1940 nine Royal Engineer sappers training on the railway were killed by a German bomb dropped on their billet in Church Street, Melbourne. Eight of them are buried in Melbourne Cemetery. The ninth soldier, Lance-Corporal William Wild was cremated at Rochdale Cemetery

=== Operations ===
View of the western portal of Ashby Tunnel on opening and after closure.

Major traffic on the line consisted of moving military stores to and from Kings Newton and Tonge, coal from the New Lount Colliery and lime from Cloud Hill, Worthington.

Eight or more locomotives were in steam daily but most were in very poor condition. They used water mainly pumped from the River Trent.

== Final years ==
The railway track was handed back to the LMS on 1 January 1945 who then submitted a bill of £25,265 to the War Department to restore the line but in 1954 the section through Ashby was closed. In 1958 steam power was replaced by diesel on many local lines and large numbers of redundant steam locomotives were stored at Chellaston quarry. In March 1966 British Railways closed Chellaston Quarry Signal Box and the sidings were lifted in 1967 when the line was returned to single track running. BR finally closed the line on 21 May 1980. In 1988 the track was lifted and the section between Chellaston East Junction and Worthington was converted into part of National Cycle Route 6.

Kings Newton Storage Depot 2010

== See also ==
- Longmoor Military Railway – Hampshire

== Print references ==
- Cooper, Alan; Leggott, Peter; Sprenger, Cyril (1990). The Melbourne Military Railway: A History of the Railway Training Centre at Melbourne and Kings Newton, 1939–1945. Oakwood Press. ISBN 0-85361-411-3.
- David Birt materials on the Melbourne Military Railway (1985–2002) at Melbourne Public Library, Assembly Rooms, Melbourne, Derbyshire.
