= Listed buildings in Derby (Blagreaves and Sinfin Wards) =

Blagreaves and Sinfin are electoral wards in the city of Derby, England. The wards contain three listed buildings that are recorded in the National Heritage List for England. The lowest of the three designations for "buildings of national importance and special interest," Grade II is used for all of the listed structures. The wards are adjacent to each other to the south of the city centre. The listed buildings consist of a commercial block, a statue and a pillbox.

== Buildings ==
Name and location	Photograph	Date	Notes
Commercial Block, Rolls-Royce Main Works Site; 52.89834°N 1.46041°W		1907–12	The commercial block, which was remodelled in 1938, is in red brick and red terracotta, the roof is slated, the middle section is faced in Portland stone, and the front extends for 38 bays. The centrepiece has a middle section of three storeys and five bays, flanked by two-storey two-bay wings. The ground floor is rusticated, and contains a central recessed doorway with a moulded surround under a balcony. Above, the three central bays are flanked by pilasters, and contain windows, over which is a parapet with a reeded frieze and a motif. The upper floors of the outer bays are in brick with quoins. Outside the centrepiece are long two-storey ranges containing three-light mullioned windows, and in the parapets are the name of the company. Extending from the north range is a porte cochère with three semicircular arches and a hipped tile roof.
Statue of Sir F. H. Royce; 52.88766°N 1.46301°W		1912	The statue was moved to its current site in Victory Road in 1990. It is in bronze by Derwent Wood, and depicts Henry Royce standing on a stone pedestal.
Anti-aircraft pillbox, Sinfin Central Business Park; 52.88645°N 1.49109°W	—	Early 1940s (probable)	The pillbox is in shuttered reinforced concrete. It is a variant of the Type 24, it has an irregular hexagonal plan and incorporates three octagonal light wells.
