= Newbold Coleorton =

Hamlet in North West Leicestershire, England

Coordinates: 52.767°N 1.407°W

Newbold
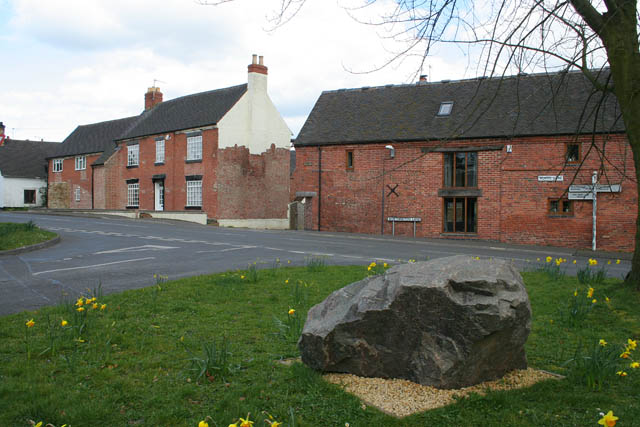

- Location within Leicestershire
- Civil parish: Worthington
- District: North West Leicestershire
- Shire county: Leicestershire
- Region: East Midlands
- Country: England
- Sovereign state: United Kingdom
- Post town: COALVILLE
- Postcode district: LE67
- Dialling code: 01530
- Police: Leicestershire
- Fire: Leicestershire
- Ambulance: East Midlands

Newbold otherwise Newbold Coleorton is a large hamlet in the parish of Worthington, Leicestershire, England. It is situated in the North West Leicestershire district, approximately midway between the town of Ashby-de-la-Zouch and the village of Whitwick, just to the north of the B5324 route.

Nearby villages include Worthington, Coleorton, Osgathorpe, Thringstone and Swannington.

In the nineteenth century it was also sometimes referred to as Newbold Juxta Worthington. An account of 1863 records that Newbold comprised approximately 500 acres (2.0 km^{2}) in the ownership of Earl Ferrers and Sir G H Beaumont Bart; also that it had a colliery. The colliery was closed in the 1980s and has since been transformed into a nature reserve with large ponds and rich forest.

Newbold today has a small village school (Newbold Church of England Primary School), a pub (the Cross Keys), and a nature reserve (New Lount Nature Reserve).

On 12 September 2019 three homes were evacuated, and a cordon was placed on Vicarage Close in Newbold Coleorton. Bomb disposal experts, paramedics, police and the fire service all attended the incident and a local man was arrested on suspicion of making or possessing explosives under suspicious circumstances. Matthew Montanow, 29 pleaded guilty to two counts of possessing explosive substances, two counts of making explosive substances, and four of possessing prohibited ammunition at Leicester Crown Court in January 2020; he was subsequently sentenced on 8 July 2020.
