= Worthington, Leicestershire =

Village in Leicestershire, England

Coordinates: 52.781°N 1.398°W

Worthington
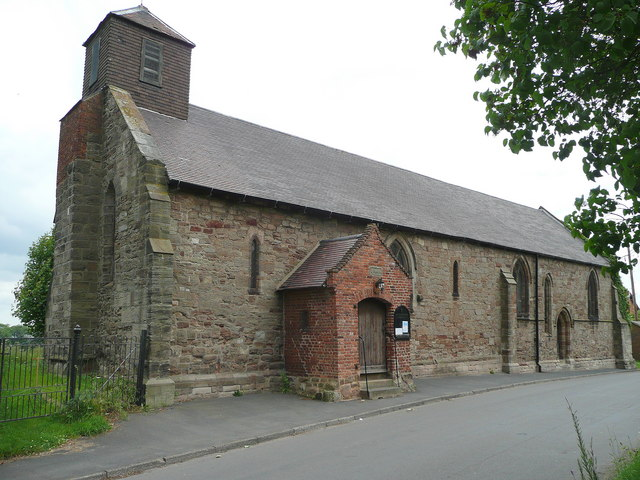
- St. Matthew's church, Worthington

- Location within Leicestershire
- Population: 1,350 (parish) (2001 Census)
- OS grid reference: SK4020
- Civil parish: Worthington
- District: North West Leicestershire
- Shire county: Leicestershire
- Region: East Midlands
- Country: England
- Sovereign state: United Kingdom
- Post town: Ashby-de-la-Zouch
- Postcode district: LE65
- Dialling code: 01530
- Police: Leicestershire
- Fire: Leicestershire
- Ambulance: East Midlands
- UK Parliament: North West Leicestershire
- Website: Worthington Parish Council

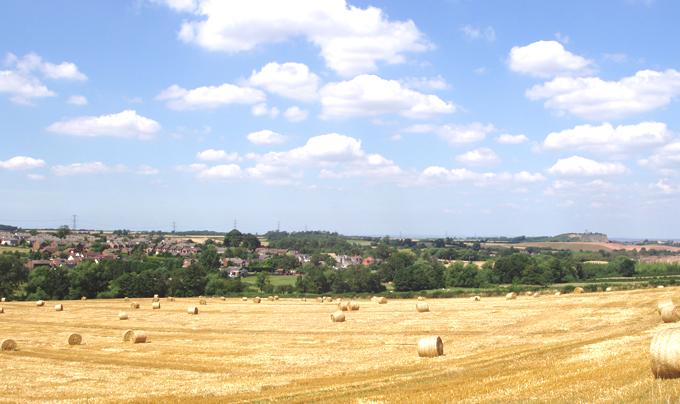
Worthington village seen from Middle Brand, with Breedon-on-the-Hill in the distance

Worthington is a village and civil parish in North West Leicestershire, England, about 4 miles (6.4 km) north of the town of Coalville and a similar distance north-east of the market town of Ashby-de-la-Zouch. The population of the civil parish (including Gelsmoor, Griffydam and Newbold) at the 2011 census was 1,461. The village is about 5 miles (8 km) from East Midlands Airport and junction 23a of the M1 motorway where it meets the A42 road. The parish also includes the hamlet of Newbold.

== History ==
Worthington's toponym may derive from the family name "Werden" or a man called "Weorth".

The Domesday Book of 1086 records Henry de Ferrers as holding four carucates of land at "Werditone".

The Church of England parish church of Saint Matthew is Norman. Most of its present windows were added in the 13th century and the remainder were added in about 1300. Fragments remain of a Perpendicular Gothic screen that was added later in the Middle Ages. St. Matthew's is now part of the United Benefice of Breedon and Worthington.

The parish lock-up is believed to have been built late in the 18th century. It is an octagonal building with an octagonal spire but is called the Round House. It is built of brick and is a scheduled monument.

Worthington Methodist Chapel was built in 1820.

In 1874 the Midland Railway extended its Melbourne branch through Worthington parish to Ashby-de-la-Zouch and opened Worthington railway station to serve the village. The Midland's successor the London, Midland and Scottish Railway withdrew the line's passenger service in the 1930s and British Railways closed the line to freight traffic in 1980.

Worthington Primary school opened in about 1926. The school use an image of the 'Round House' as their logo which was created by Michael Colley, a local resident and landlord of the local pub the Malt shovel. He created the design in the early 1990s which substantially became the village logo.

The parish was predominantly rural until the 20th century, when the village was rapidly expanded to house workers for nearby collieries including New Lount Colliery. By the 1990s many of the local collieries had ceased operating and the village began to lose its mining identity.

Local nicknames for Worthington have included "Paraffin City" due to its late adoption of electricity, and "Yawny Box" which is an obsolete Derbyshire word for a donkey.

== Amenities ==
Worthington has a public house, the Malt Shovel Inn. It used to have another pub called the Swan.

The village has a post office.

National Cycle Route 6 passes through the parish, and at the site of the former railway station it joins the trackbed of the former railway to Melbourne, Derbyshire. In the parish the cycle route is called the Cloud Trail.

The parish is in the hunting country of the Quorn Hunt.

== Sources and further reading ==
- Dawson, John (2003). Hand-one-down Hearsays of the Parish of Breedon, Griffydam, Isley Walton, Langley, Lount, Newbold, Scotland, Staunton Harold, Tonge, Wilson and Worthington 1870-1970. Breedon: Rev. John Dawson. p. 188.
- Mills, A.D.; Room, A. (2003). A Dictionary of British Place-Names. Oxford: Oxford University Press. p. not cited. ISBN 0-19-852758-6.
- Pevsner, Nikolaus (1960). Leicestershire and Rutland. The Buildings of England. Harmondsworth: Penguin Books. p. 268.
- Wright, Thomas, ed. (1857). Dictionary of Obsolete and Provincial English: Containing words from the English writers previous to the Nineteenth Century which are no longer in use, or are not used in the same sense. And words which are now used only in the provincial dialects. Vol. II G–Z. London: Henry G. Bohn. p. 1035.
