= Sinfin Branch Line =

Railway line in Derbyshire, England

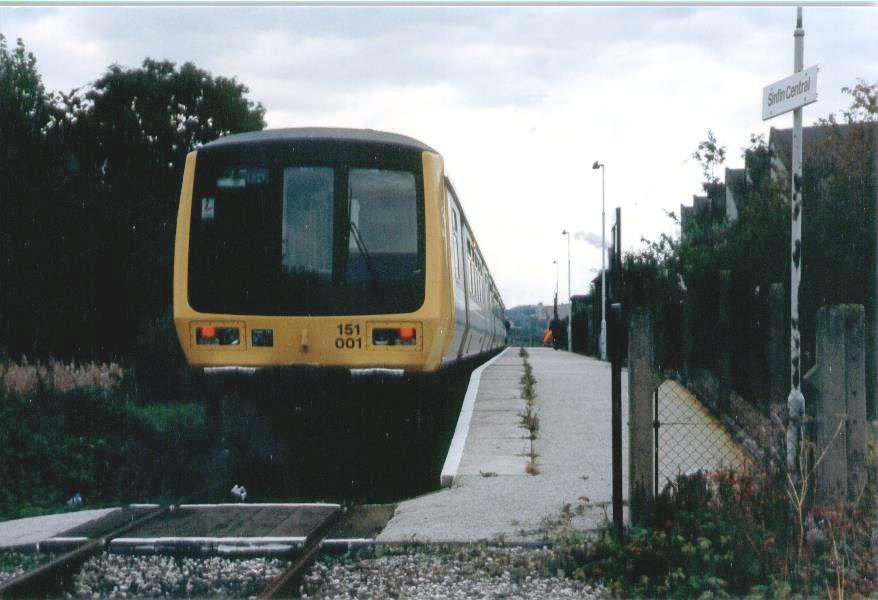
- Sinfin Central railway station, Derby, 1986

Overview
- Status: Open
- Owner: Network Rail
- Termini: Melbourne Junction; Sinfin
- Stations: 2 (closed)

Service
- Type: Heavy rail

Technical
- Track length: 1 mile 16 chains (1.9 km)
- Number of tracks: 1
- Track gauge: 1,435 mm (4 ft 8 1/2 in) standard gauge

The Sinfin Branch Line is a short branch line in the Sinfin area of Derby, Derbyshire. The line, which serves the premises of Rolls-Royce and other works sites, uses a stretch of the former Melbourne line.

On 4 October 1976, the British Railways Board reopened this section to passenger services in conjunction with Derby City Council to promote a city-wide transport plan. Passengers services ceased in 1988, in part, due to poor timetabling and the low number of daily trains. In 1997, the line was officially closed again. However, the branch line was not lifted as it has been used by Rolls Royce for freight.

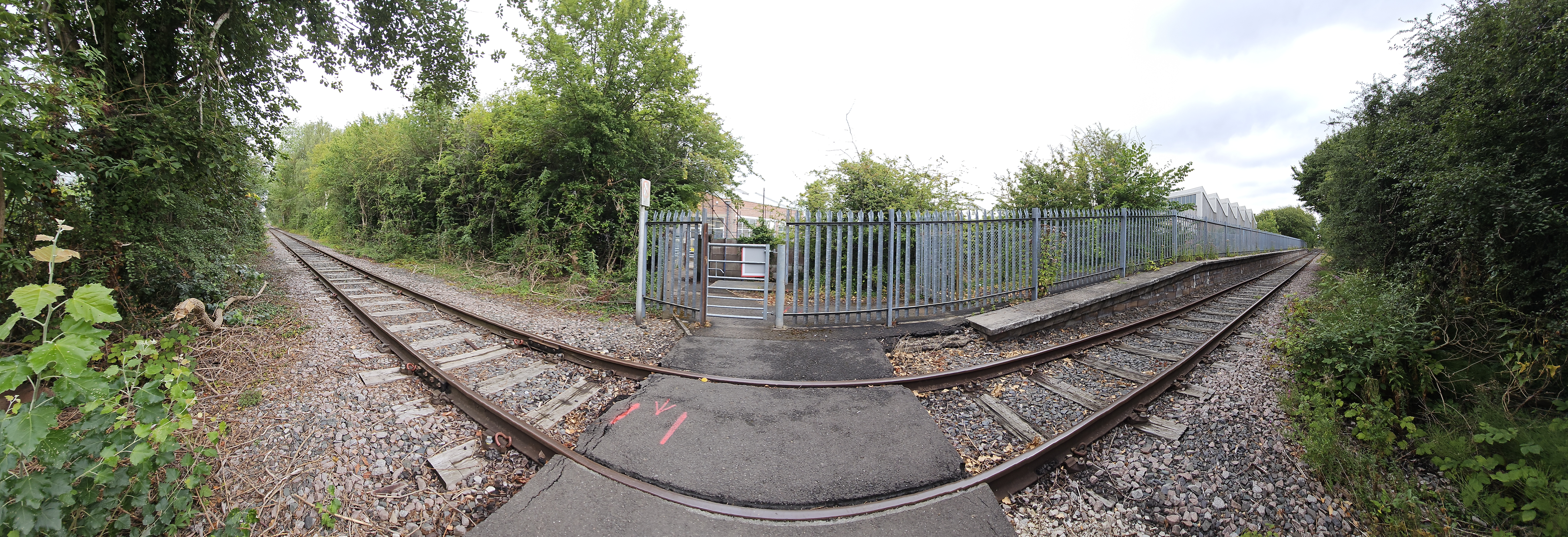
Panorama of Sinfin branch line, taken from Sinfin Central station

== History ==
The original line was opened by the Midland Railway in 1868. Its purpose was to connect Derby with Melbourne via the Castle Donington Line at Chellaston Junction. The entire route was double tracked (with various sidings). However, it failed to generate the projected revenues so passengers services were withdrawn in 1930, although the line remained open to freight services.

The section of railway from Chellaston to Ashby de la Zouch was taken over by the War Department at the outbreak of the Second World War and became the Melbourne Military Railway. The entire line was closed by British Rail in 1980, and lifted in 1988. The only surviving section is the Sinfin Branch Line.

=== Reopening ===
Disused Sinfin Central station on the Sinfin line

The Sinfin Branch line, which had two stops Sinfin North and Sinfin Central, was reopened to passenger services on 4 October 1976 with a short length of 1 mile 16 chains (1.9 km). Derby City Council attempted to create a cross-city line interworking with the Derwent Valley Line to Matlock to deter people from clogging up the roads across the city in rush hour. However, the services were poorly used because of the time of the last train and the infrequency of services; just four trains per day. By 1992, trains had been reduced to a single early morning service. The last timetabled train ran on 21 May 1993, however, a taxi service took passengers to stations on the line up until 1998.

On 2 May 1997 the line became part of the Central Trains franchise following the privatisation of British Rail but no Central Trains services ever used the line. On 6 November 1997 Central Trains and the Director of Passenger Rail Franchising proposed the closure of the line. This was granted on 21 May 1998 by the Rail Regulator John Swift QC.

Despite the line's closure, the Sinfin-Derby to Matlock service was still timetabled as such until May 2001; however, it did not proceed onto the branch line as it terminated at Peartree railway station.

== Current status ==
Sinfin Branch line survives as a freight-only line serving the Rolls-Royce plant with a freight train carrying aviation fuel. Both platforms still exist, although Sinfin North railway station has become overgrown. In addition, gated barriers were installed in 2023, preventing anyone who is not a Rolls-Royce employee from reaching the stations.

Occasional proposals suggest reopening the line and extending it into Chellaston and onto East Midlands Airport, but this is projected to not be undertaken until 2045. Network Rail have no immediate plans to reactivate the line to passengers.
