= Long Eaton railway station =

Railway station in Derbyshire, England

Coordinates: 52°53′06″N 1°17′14″W

Long Eaton
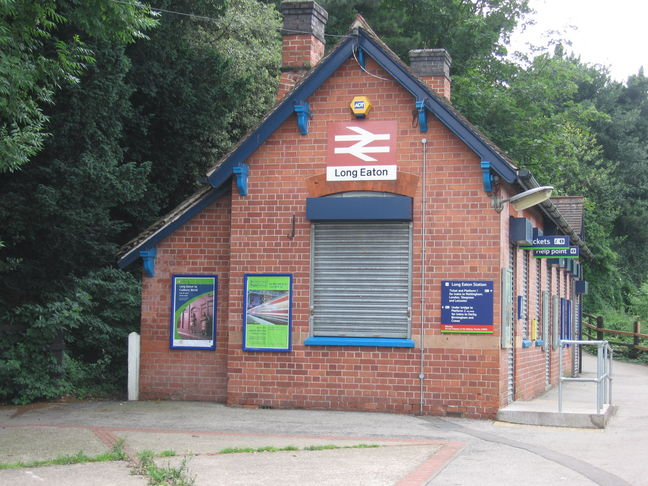
- The station building

General information
- Location: Long Eaton, Erewash, England
- Grid reference: SK481321
- Owner: Network Rail
- Manager: East Midlands Railway
- Platforms: 2

Other information
- Station code: LGE
- Classification: DfT category D

History
- Opened: 10 December 1888
- Original company: Midland Railway
- Pre-grouping: Midland Railway
- Post-grouping: London, Midland and Scottish Railway

Key dates
- 1932: Renamed Sawley Junction for Long Eaton
- 1967: Renamed Long Eaton

Passengers
- 2020/21: ▼0.143 million
- Interchange: ▼1,717
- 2021/22: ▲0.461 million
- Interchange: ▲6,811
- 2022/23: ▲0.475 million
- Interchange: ▲7,527
- 2023/24: ▲0.520 million
- Interchange: ▲8,315
- 2024/25: ▲0.652 million
- Interchange: ▲11,535
Location
Notes
- Passenger statistics from the Office of Rail and Road

Long Eaton railway station serves the town of Long Eaton, in Derbyshire, England. It is on the Midland Main Line and the Derby-Nottingham line, 120 miles 28 chains (193.7 km) north of London St Pancras. The station is managed by East Midlands Railway, which operates services with CrossCountry.

== History ==
The line was opened by the Midland Counties Railway in 1839, which soon joined the North Midland Railway and the Birmingham and Derby Junction Railway to form the Midland Railway.

The station was designed by A.A. Langley, engineer to the Midland Railway, and opened as Sawley Junction on 10 December 1888 on Tamworth Road.

From the 1920s until 1937, the station was managed by the station master at Trent Junction.

In 1932, the London, Midland and Scottish Railway announced that Sawley Junction would be known as Sawley Junction for Long Eaton. In 1967, the station became known as Long Eaton.

=== Accidents and incidents ===
On 9 October 1869, a Midland Railway passenger train was involved in a rear-end collision with another train at Long Eaton Junction; it resulted in seven deaths, with another twelve injured. The investigation blamed fog, inadequate braking power, excessive speed and fogman error for the collision.

== Facilities ==
The station is staffed during the day. There is a ticket office, with three automatic ticket machines sited externally. There is a car park with 94 spaces, with lockers available for bicycles.

== Services ==
A map of East Midlands Railway's InterCity and Connect services, showing the current service pattern each hour

The station is served by two train operating companies; the usual Monday–Saturday service pattern in trains per hour is as follows:

CrossCountry:

- 1 tph to Nottingham
- 1 tph to Cardiff Central, via Birmingham New Street.

East Midlands Railway:

- 1 tph to London St Pancras, via Leicester
- 2 tph to Nottingham; of which:
  - 1 tph continues to Newark Castle
- 1 tph to Sheffield
- 1 tph to Matlock
- 1 tph to Crewe.

On Sundays, the London to Sheffield trains call hourly in each direction and the Matlock trains every two hours. There is an hourly Derby to Nottingham stopping service in each direction, but no direct service to Birmingham.

The Midland Main Line runs north–south through Long Eaton: north to Derby, Chesterfield and Sheffield; south to East Midlands Parkway, Loughborough, Leicester and London St Pancras.

A major junction south of the station at Trent links with the cross-country route eastbound to Nottingham. Westbound services to Birmingham travel via Derby and the Cross Country Route.

Preceding station	National Rail	Following station
Derby	East Midlands Railway Midland Main Line	East Midlands Parkway
Derby	CrossCountry Cardiff–Nottingham	Beeston
Spondon	CrossCountry Cardiff–Nottingham	Attenborough
Spondon	East Midlands Railway Derwent Valley Line	Attenborough
	Historical railways	
Sawley; Line open, station closed	Midland Railway; Midland Main Line	Kegworth; Line open, station closed
Sawley; Line open, station closed	Midland Railway; Midland Main Line	Trent; Line open, station closed
