= Tonge and Breedon railway station =

Former railway station in Leicestershire, England

Tonge and Breedon
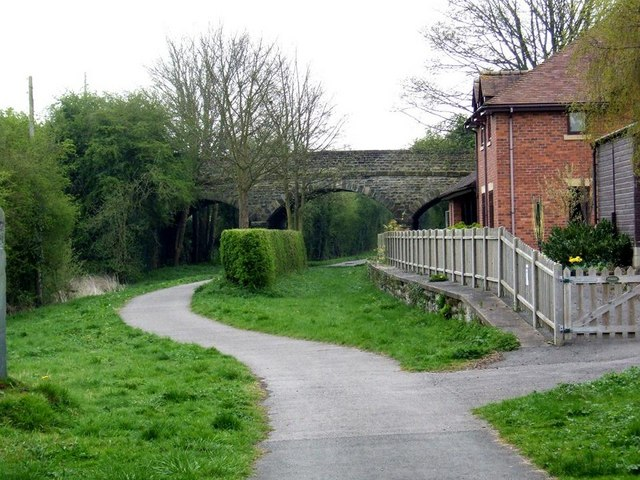
- Former Station

General information
- Location: Tonge, North West Leicestershire; England
- Coordinates: 52.8114°N 1.3829°W
- Grid reference: SK416239

Other information
- Status: Disused

History
- Original company: Midland Railway
- Pre-grouping: Midland Railway
- Post-grouping: London, Midland and Scottish Railway

Key dates
- 1 October 1869: Station opened
- 22 Sept 1930: Passenger service withdrawn
- 1939: Line becomes Melbourne Military Railway
- 1945: Line returned to LMS
- 21 May 1980: Line closed to freight traffic
Location

Tonge and Breedon railway station was a station at Tonge that served the adjacent village of Breedon-on-the-Hill, Leicestershire, England.

== History ==
It was opened on 1 October 1869 by the Midland Railway on an extension of the Melbourne Line from Melbourne to Worthington.

In 1930 passenger services were withdrawn and the Midland's successor, the London, Midland and Scottish Railway, was using the line only for freight services. During the Second World War the line became the Melbourne Military Railway. In 1945 the War Department returned the line and station to the LMS.

In 1980 British Railways closed the line and by the 1990s the track had been dismantled. The trackbed through the former station is now part of National Cycle Route 6.

== Stationmasters ==
- W. Borth until 1872 (afterwards station master at Holmes)
- J. Blackwell 1872 - 1873 (afterwards station master at Fiskerton)
- S. Poole 1873 - 1874 (afterwards station master at South Wigston)
- George Hall 1874 - 1876 (afterwards station master at Broughton)
- A.H. Walker 1876 - 1877
- G. Hall 1877 - 1880
- William Walker 1880 - 1883 (afterwards station master at Walton)
- G. Ravenhall 1883 - 1884 (afterwards station master at Wadborough)
- William Henry Payne 1884 - 1886 (afterwards station master at Burton Joyce)
- A.W. Baker 1886 - 1888
- W. Clark 1888- 1889 (formerly station master at Cradoc, afterwards station master at Longstow)
- S. Hart 1889 - 1891 (afterwards station master at Worthington)
- G. Albutt 1891 - 1894 afterwards station master at Worthington)
- E.J. Watkley 1894 - 1895 (afterwards station master at Walsall Wood)
- A.H. Scott 1895 - 1902 (afterwards station master at Denby)
- R. Haynes 1902 - 1906 (afterwards station master at Little Eaton)
- Thomas Tongue 1906 - 1914
- George Henry Wakefield 1914 - ca. 1941

== Route ==
Preceding station	Disused railways	Following station
Worthington; Line and station closed	Midland Railway; Melbourne line 1871 - 1930	Melbourne; Line and station closed
Worthington; Line and station closed	Midland Railway; Melbourne line 1869 - 1871	Wilson; Line and station closed
