= Spondon railway station =

Station in Derbyshire, England

Coordinates: 52°54′43″N 1°24′38″W

Spondon
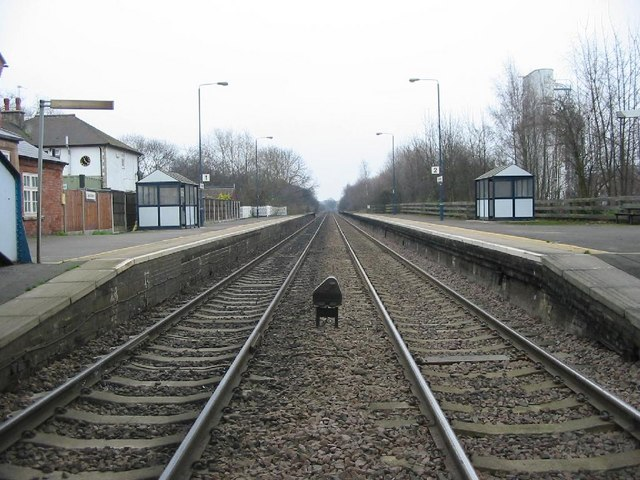

General information
- Location: Spondon, City of Derby; England
- Grid reference: SK397351
- Manager: East Midlands Railway
- Platforms: 2

Other information
- Station code: SPO
- Classification: DfT category F2

Passengers
- 2021/22: ▲8,400
- 2022/23: ▲8,536
- 2023/24: ▲24,486
- 2024/25: ▲47,006
- 2025/26: ▲58,308
Location
Notes
- Passenger statistics from the Office of Rail and Road

Spondon railway station serves the large village of Spondon in the city of Derby, in Derbyshire, England. The station is owned by Network Rail and managed by East Midlands Railway.

== History ==
Lying on the Derby–Nottingham line, the first station on the site was opened by the Midland Counties Railway (MCR) on 5 June 1839. The fifth station from Nottingham, it was kept by a Mr. Carter.

Trains to Spondon originally left from the north end of Derby station before turning east towards Nottingham. However, on 27 June 1867 the Midland Railway, successor to the MCR, opened a new route towards Nottingham (and London) which led from the south end of Derby station (so that Manchester – London trains would no longer have to reverse at Derby). The new route and the old joined immediately west of Spondon, which was to remain a junction station until 1969, when the original, more northerly, connection to Derby was closed as a through route.

The station was enlarged in the early 20th century to cope with the volume of traffic for the nearby British Celanese plant. In the 1920s, more than 14,000 worked here. The station is also the location of the junction for rail freight traffic into the British Celanese works.

It was planned that both platforms would be extended by up to 25 metres no later than 2012.

== Stationmasters ==
On 13 August 1924 the station master, Henry Ernest Haines, was killed in the stationmaster’s house when a lorry crashed into the building. The driver of the lorry was heading for the British Celanese works and had crossed the canal bridge when he realised that the level crossing gates were closed. He was unable to stop and rather than run into the gates he steered into the stationmaster’s house and office.

- Joseph Chambers 1857 - 1876
- G. Bailey 1876 - 1886
- James C. Chidgey 1886 - 1897 (afterwards station master at Redland, Bristol)
- Samuel Pitt 1897 - 1898 (formerly station master at Oakley, Bedfordshire, afterwards station master at Rowsley)
- Frank Porter 1898 - 1901 (formerly station master at East Langton, afterwards station master at Bakewell)
- William Cope 1901 - 1909 (afterwards station master at Duffield)
- James Harford 1909? - 1921 (formerly station master at Tibshelf, afterwards station master at Chinley)
- Henry Ernest Haines 1921 - 1924
- Ernest J. Brooks 1925 - 1931 (formerly station master at Thrapstone)
- W.B. Barker 1932 - 1940
- Edmund T. Jackson 1940 - 1947 (formerly station master at Dronfield, afterwards station master at Belper)
- G.R. Hemmings 1947 Onwards (formerly station master at Rowsley)

== Current services ==
Train services at Spondon are operated by East Midlands Railway and CrossCountry.

The typical off-peak service in trains per hour is:

- 1 train per 2 hours to Lincoln via Nottingham
- 1 train per 2 hours to Cleethorpes via Nottingham and Lincoln
- 1 train per hour to Matlock via Derby

The station is also served by a small number of CrossCountry services between Cardiff Central, Birmingham New Street and Nottingham.

Prior to May 2021, the station was served by a limited service with regular hourly services being introduced on that year’s timetable change.

Fast trains on the Midland Main Line pass by the station but do not stop.

Preceding station	National Rail	Following station
Derby	CrossCountry Cardiff to Nottingham Monday-Saturday only	Long Eaton
Derby	East Midlands Railway Derwent Valley line	Long Eaton
	Historical railways	
Derby Line and station open	Midland Railway Midland Main Line	Borrowash Line open, station closed
