= Derwent Valley line =

Railway line in Derbyshire, England

Coordinates: 53.0832°N 1.5041°W

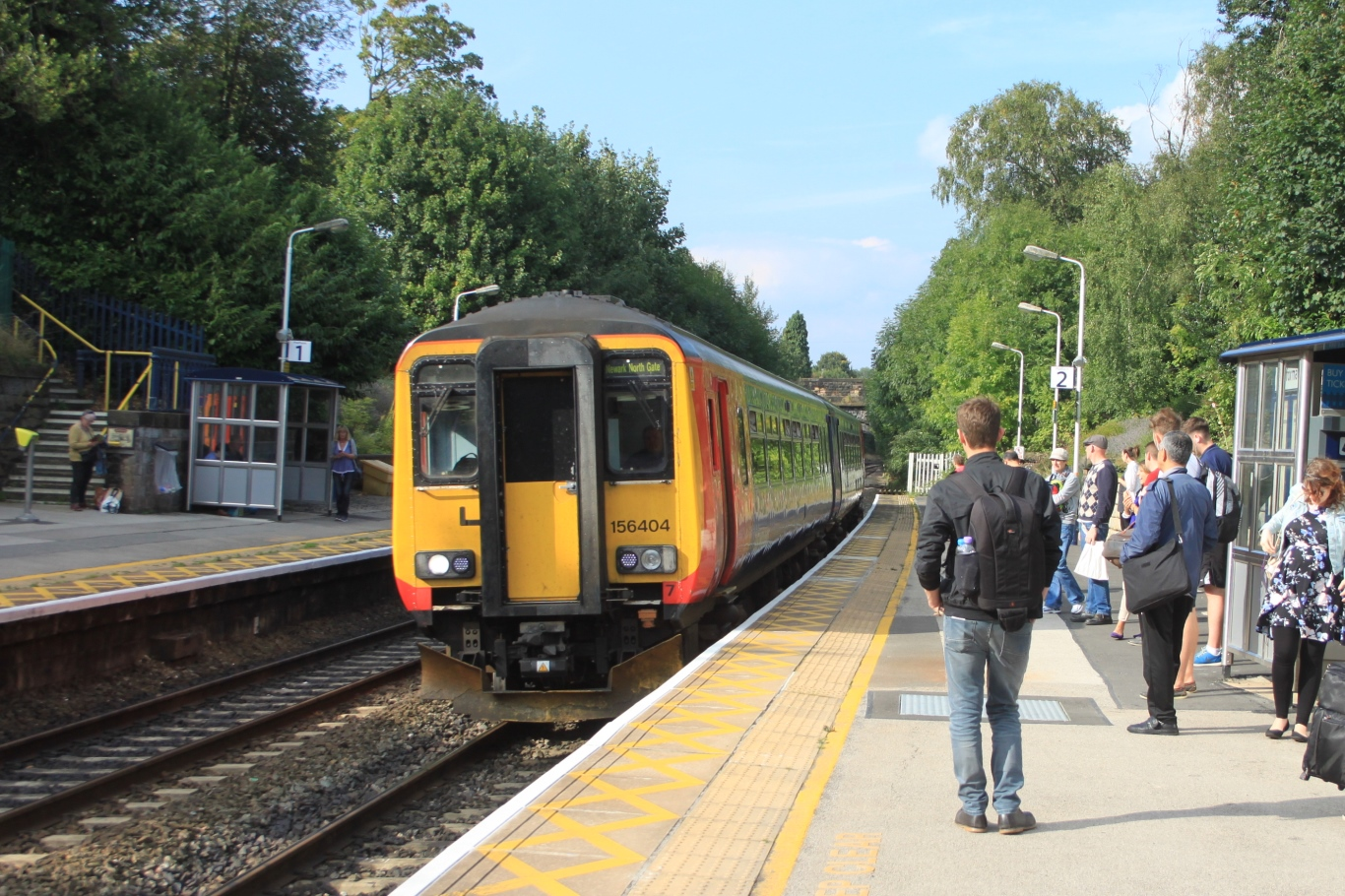
- An East Midlands Trains Class 156 at Belper, with a service from Matlock to Newark

Overview
- Status: Operational
- Owner: Network Rail
- Locale: East Midlands
- Termini: Matlock; Derby
- Stations: 8

Service
- Type: Heavy rail
- System: National Rail
- Operator: East Midlands Railway
- Depot: Derby
- Rolling stock: Class 158 Express Sprinter; Class 170 Turbostar

History
- Opened: 1839

Technical
- Number of tracks: Double track from Derby to Ambergate Junction, then single track to Matlock
- Character: Branch line
- Track gauge: 4 ft 8 1/2 in (1,435 mm) standard gauge
- Operating speed: 50 mph
Route map
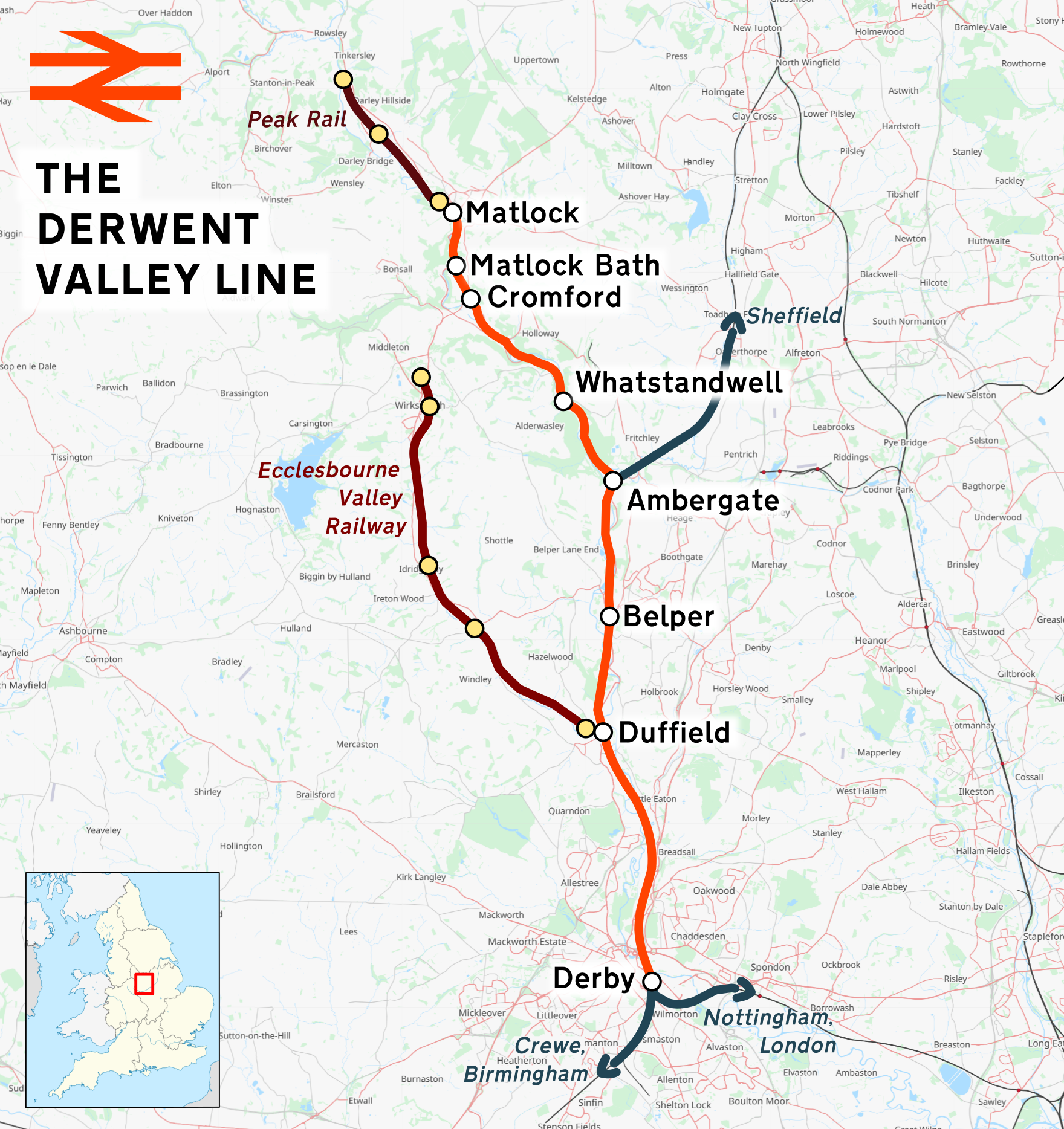
(Click to expand)

The Derwent Valley line is a railway line between Derby and Matlock in Derbyshire, England. It follows the Midland Main Line as far as Ambergate Junction, just south of Ambergate; it continues to Matlock, following the course of the River Derwent.

== History ==
The section from Derby to Ambergate was built by the North Midland Railway (which ran between Derby and Leeds) and was opened in 1839. Ambergate quickly became busy with tourists alighting for Matlock Bath, who would travel onwards by coach. The Birmingham and Derby Junction Railway also operated excursions from Birmingham completing the journey by way of the Cromford Canal.

In 1849, the Manchester, Buxton, Matlock and Midlands Junction Railway opened from Ambergate and ran as far as Rowsley. Lack of finance prevented it from proceeding any further, but Matlock Bath capitalised on its reputation as a tourist town with the appellation Little Switzerland.

The line was leased jointly by the Midland Railway and the LNWR and, in spite of determined opposition from the latter, the Midland succeeded in reaching Manchester in 1867.

The Midland, and later the LMS, regarded it as one of their premier lines, linking Manchester with the East Midlands and London. Indeed, it could be regarded as the original Midland Main Line carrying such prestige expresses as The Palatine and the Peaks Express. In the twentieth century, it also carried The Midland Pullman. Initially, there was a great deal of parcel traffic, particularly textiles from the various mills, and the line was also immensely important for coal traffic from Nottinghamshire and Derbyshire to Manchester and, southwards, for limestone from the Peak District. A large motive power depot was provided at Rowsley to split trains and provide banking engines for the long haul up to Peak Forest.

With the end of water power for the mills and the introduction of road transport, the parcel traffic disappeared, but minerals remained important until the mid-20th century. In 1968, however, the route from Matlock to Buxton (Midland) was closed during the Beeching Axe.

The line between the quarry north of Matlock and Ambergate remained as a single track carrying a small amount of limestone, with a passenger service continuing from Matlock (supported strongly by Derby railway employees with their free passes).

During the period from 1976 to 1993, trains would run through Derby from the Derwent Valley line to Sinfin. This ceased when the Sinfin branch line was first replaced with a taxi, then closed in 1998. The service later returned as a train as far as Peartree as a single train each day until 2001.

While the railway workers had largely disappeared at the beginning of the 21st century, there is renewed public interest in rail; Derbyshire County Council, among others, is keen to reduce traffic congestion on the A6 and in the Peak District National Park. The route between Matlock and Rowsley was taken over by the Peak Rail preservation group, who are campaigning for the link to be restored to Buxton. The County Council carried out a study in 2004, which concluded that it was not economically feasible, but that the track bed would be protected from development.

It was designated by the Department for Transport as a community rail service in July 2006 and was fully designated as a community rail line in September 2006.

Meanwhile, the interest shown by the local councils and public groups such as the Derwent Valley Rural Transport Partnership and the Friends of the Derwent Valley has encouraged the interest of railway companies. In particular, it follows the course of the Derwent Valley Mills World Heritage corridor. Former operator Central Trains heavily promoted the line's tourist potential with a specially liveried train. Another former operator, Midland Mainline, extended some of its London–Derby services to Matlock, though these ceased with the introduction of the Class 222 Meridians which were too heavy for several bridges north of Whatstandwell which are in a poor state of repair. However Network Rail has announced its intention to overhaul the line completely in 2008, reinforcing or replacing the defective bridges.

Passengers using the line have increased steadily at many stations on the line. 94% more passengers used its stations in 2010/11 than in 2007/08; journeys from Ambergate, Belper, Duffield and Matlock Bath have doubled in the same period. On 2 July 2011, Peak Rail extended their services from Matlock Riverside into Matlock to provide easy interchange between services.

== Stations ==
- Derby
- Duffield
  - Former branch line diverges to Wirksworth. This route has been sold and is disconnected from the mainline, but has reopened as the Ecclesbourne Valley Railway heritage railway.
- Belper
- Ambergate
  - Route diverges away from the Midland Main Line just to the south of Ambergate station.
- Whatstandwell
- Cromford
- Matlock Bath
- Matlock

== Operations ==
Local passenger services are operated by East Midlands Railway. There is an hourly service between Lincoln and Matlock, via Derby with one train every two hours starting in Cleethorpes.

The line is operated as one single line block section from Ambergate, using the No Signalman Key Token system under the supervision of Derby PSB. The driver of each train heading for Matlock must collect a token from the machine at Ambergate station before proceeding and return it prior to leaving the branch.

In addition to the local passenger services, the line between Derby and Ambergate Junction is also used by East Midlands Railway and CrossCountry's fast services along with freight services operated by various companies.

The Matlock branch lost its through services to London St Pancras in 2004 when (the former mainline operator) Midland Mainline replaced its Class 170 Turbostar diesel multiple units with Class 222 Meridian sets. The Meridians were not cleared to work on the branch, unlike the Turbostars.

== See also ==
- Manchester, Buxton, Matlock and Midlands Junction Railway
- Peak Rail
- Ecclesbourne Valley Railway
- Midland Main Line
