= Worthington railway station =

Former railway station in Leicestershire, England

Worthington

General information
- Location: Worthington, Leicestershire, North West Leicestershire; England
- Coordinates: 52.785°N 1.397°W
- Grid reference: SK40752095

Other information
- Status: Disused

History
- Original company: Midland Railway
- Pre-grouping: Midland Railway
- Post-grouping: London, Midland and Scottish Railway

Key dates
- 1 October 1869: Station opened
- 22 Sept 1930: Passenger service withdrawn
- 1939: Line becomes Melbourne Military Railway
- 1945: Line returned to LMS
- 21 May 1980: Line closed to freight traffic
Location

Worthington railway station was a station at Worthington, Leicestershire, England.

== History ==
The station opened on 1 October 1869 when the Midland Railway extended its Line from Melbourne. The line was further extended in 1874 from Worthington to Ashby de la Zouch.

In 1930 passenger services were withdrawn and the Midland's successor, the London, Midland and Scottish Railway, was using the line only for freight services. During the Second World War the line became the Melbourne Military Railway. In 1945 the War Department returned the line and station to the LMS.

In 1980 British Railways closed the line and by the 1990s the track had been dismantled. National Cycle Route 6 now joins the trackbed at the site of the former station.

== Route ==
Preceding station	Disused railways	Following station
Ashby de la Zouch; Line open, station closed	Midland Railway; Melbourne line	Tonge and Breedon; Line and station closed
