= Melbourne railway station (United Kingdom) =

Former railway station in Derbyshire, England

Melbourne
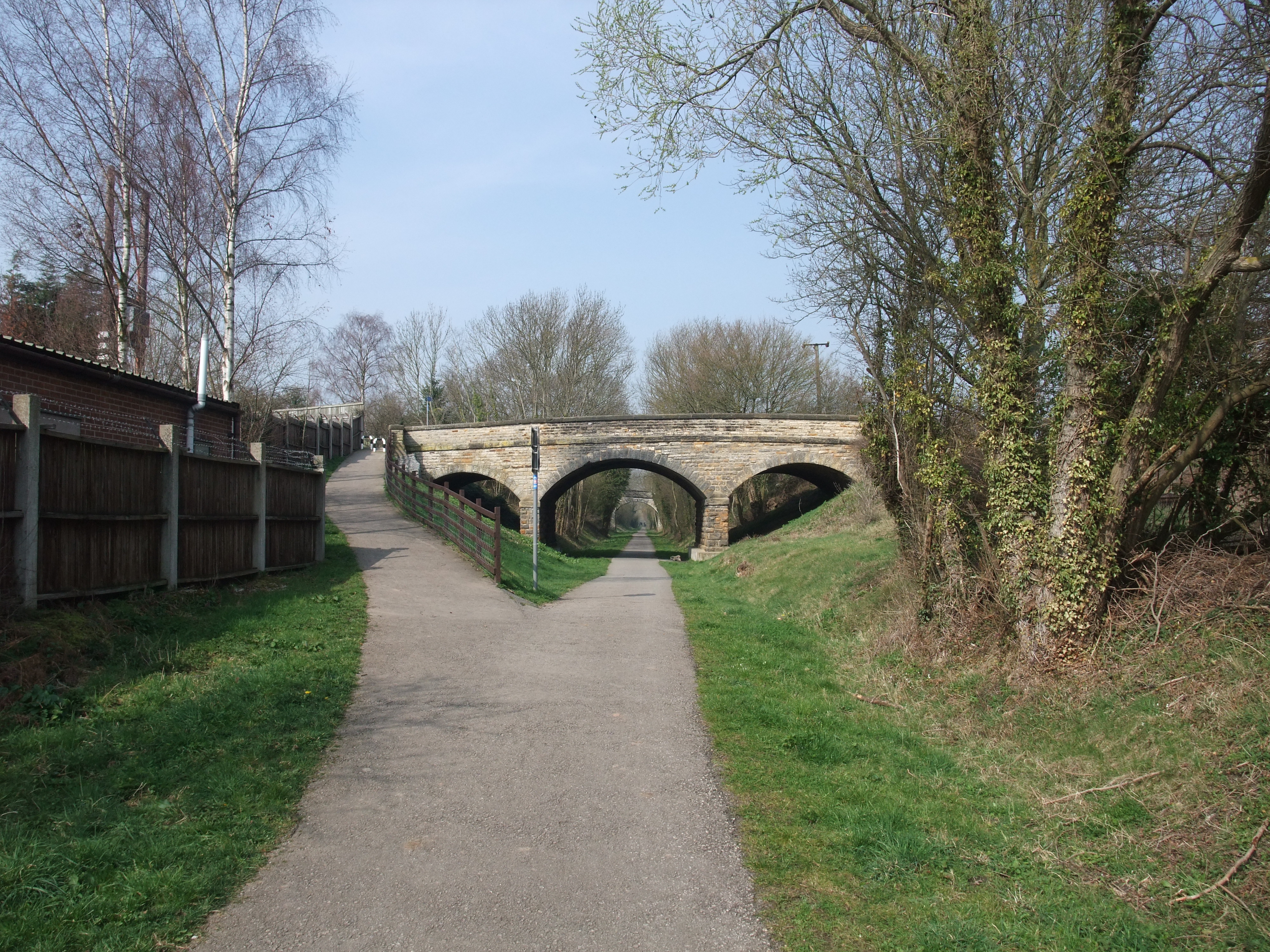
- Stone bridge crossing the site of Melbourne station. The branch's trackbed has become the Cloud Trail footpath.

General information
- Location: Kings Newton, South Derbyshire; England
- Coordinates: 52.829°N 1.415°W
- Grid reference: SK395260

Other information
- Status: Disused

History
- Original company: Midland Railway
- Pre-grouping: Midland Railway
- Post-grouping: London, Midland and Scottish Railway

Key dates
- 1 September 1868: Station opened as terminus
- 1874: Line extended and Melbourne becomes through station
- 22 September 1930: Passenger service withdrawn
- 1939: Station becomes Melbourne Military Railway depot
- 1945: Line returned to LMS
- 21 May 1980: Line closed to freight traffic
Location

Melbourne railway station was a station at Kings Newton that served the adjacent town of Melbourne, Derbyshire, England.

== History ==
It was opened in 1868 as the terminus of a Midland Railway branch from Derby Midland. In 1874 it became a through station as the line was extended to a junction on the Leicester to Burton upon Trent Line near Ashby-de-la-Zouch.

In 1930 passenger services were withdrawn and the Midland's successor, the London, Midland and Scottish Railway, was using the line only for freight services. During the Second World War the line became the Melbourne Military Railway and Melbourne station became its headquarters. In 1945 the War Department returned the line and station to the LMS.

In 1980 British Railways closed the line and by the 1990s the track had been dismantled. The trackbed through the former station is now part of National Cycle Route 6.

== Route ==
Preceding station	Disused railways	Following station
Tonge and Breedon; Line and station closed	Midland Railway; Melbourne line 1871 - 1930	Chellaston and Swarkestone; Line and station closed
Wilson; Line and station closed	Midland Railway; Melbourne line 1869 - 1871	Chellaston and Swarkestone; Line and station closed
