= Peartree railway station =

Railway station in Derbyshire, England

Coordinates: 52.89728°N 1.47285°W

Peartree
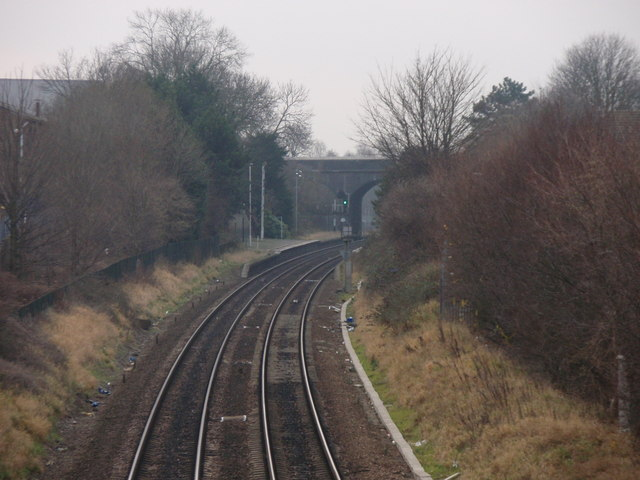
- Peartree railway station

General information
- Location: Pear Tree, City of Derby; England
- Grid reference: SK356335
- Manager: East Midlands Railway
- Platforms: 2

Other information
- Station code: PEA
- Classification: DfT category F2

History
- Original company: Midland Railway
- Pre-grouping: Midland Railway
- Post-grouping: LMS

Key dates
- 2 June 1890: Opened as Pear Tree and Normanton
- 4 March 1968: Closed
- 4 October 1976: Reopened as Peartree

Passengers
- 2021/22: ▲4,052
- 2022/23: ▲4,374
- 2023/24: ▼4,354
- 2024/25: ▲5,256
- 2025/26: ▲5,674
Location
Notes
- Passenger statistics from the Office of Rail and Road

Peartree railway station is a railway station serving the areas of Pear Tree, Normanton and Osmaston in the city of Derby, England. It is one of three stations remaining open in the city (the others being the main Derby station and Spondon), and is situated about one mile south of Derby station on the main line to Birmingham New Street. For a short period, Derby - Birmingham local services called at Peartree, but it is now served by four trains each way on weekdays on the Crewe–Derby line, a community rail line also known as the North Staffordshire line. The station is owned by Network Rail and managed by East Midlands Railway.

== History ==
The station was opened on 2 June 1890 and originally named Pear Tree and Normanton. The opening of the station opened up the area between it and Normanton Barracks for development. The plots of 333 square yards were advertised as "suitable for workmen's dwellings or small villas". The initial service provided by the Midland Railway was eleven trains each day to and from Derby.

A branch line to Melbourne diverged from the main line at Melbourne Junction immediately south of the station. This branch had been wholly closed to passenger traffic by 1930, and the diminished importance of Pear Tree and Normanton station as a result contributed to its closure on 4 March 1968.

On 4 October 1976, the branch line was partially reopened as far as Sinfin in order to transport workers to and from the Rolls-Royce plant there, with services running through to Matlock. As a result, the station was reopened and renamed Peartree. Whereas Sinfin North was within Rolls-Royce's property and hence accessible only to employees, Peartree and Sinfin Central had public access. Although the Sinfin branch was closed to passengers in 1998, Peartree has remained open as a result of its location on the main line. Despite this, main line services rarely stop here and the station is little used by passengers.

== Facilities ==
Access to the platforms is from Osmaston Park Road (part of the A5111 Derby ring road), which crosses the line immediately to the south of the station via locked gates which are opened for passengers who use the provided intercom. There are no station buildings or shelter, and the entrances were badly overgrown. In January 2007, the station had no signage denoting the location and the platforms were in an exceedingly poor state of repair, but by April 2009 it had been refurbished with new lighting and new signs installed. As the station is unstaffed and with no ticket vending machines, passengers must purchase the ticket on board; the full range of tickets for travel are purchased from the guard on the train at no extra cost.

== Services ==
All services at Peartree are operated by East Midlands Railway.

The station is currently served by four trains per weekday towards Crewe, three trains towards Lincoln via Derby and one train towards Nottingham, as well as two trains per day in each direction on Saturdays.

There is no Sunday service.

CrossCountry services between Derby and Birmingham New Street pass through the station but do not stop.

Preceding station	National Rail	Following station
Tutbury and Hatton	East Midlands Railway: Crewe to Derby Line; Limited Service	Derby
	Disused railways	
Sinfin North	Central Trains Sinfin Branch Line	Derby
