= Derby railway station =

Railway station in Derbyshire, England

Derby
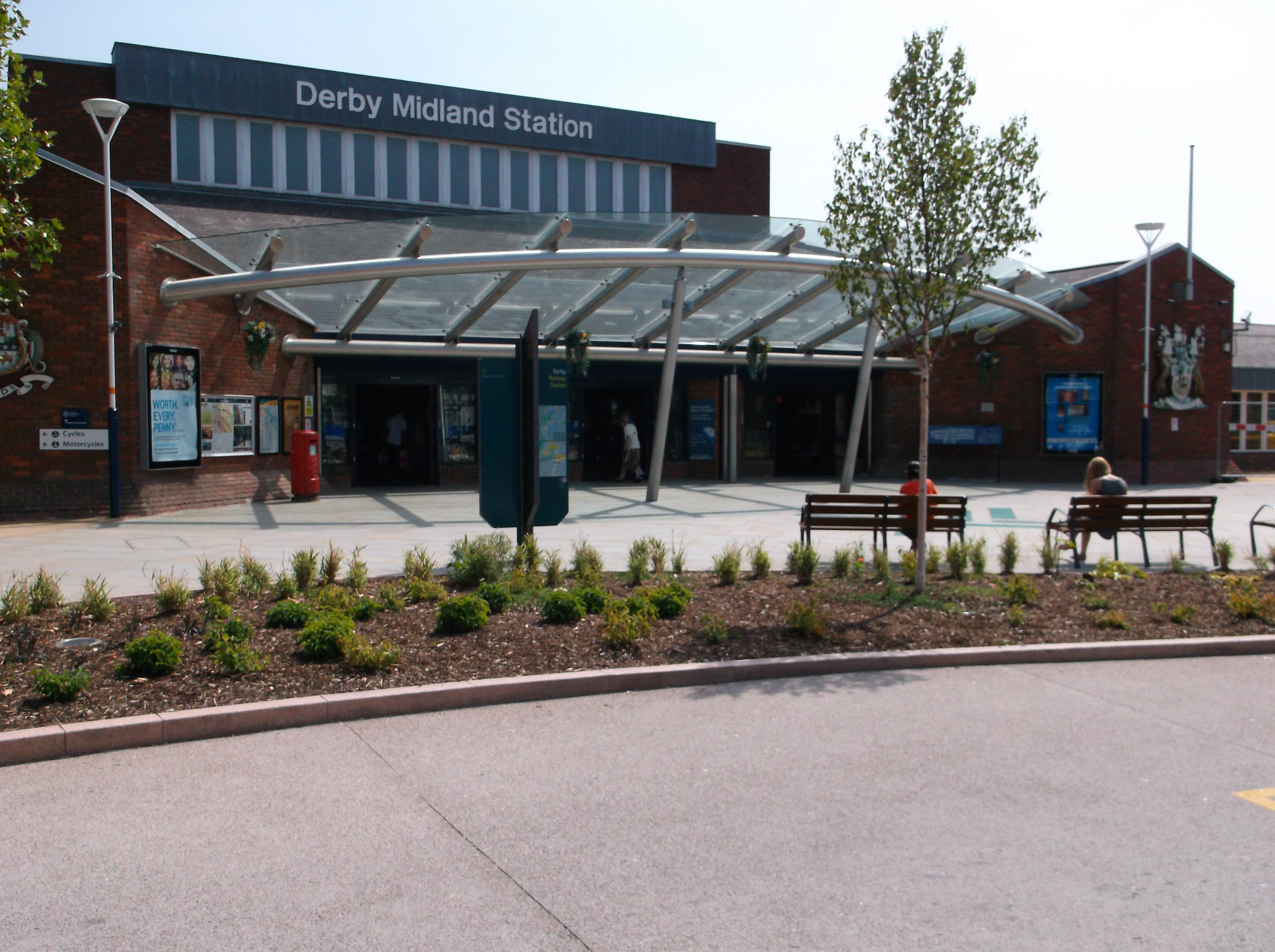
- Derby railway station

General information
- Location: Derby, City of Derby, England
- Coordinates: 52°54′58″N 1°27′48″W
- Grid reference: SK362355
- Owner: Network Rail
- Manager: East Midlands Railway
- Platforms: 7

Other information
- Station code: DBY
- Classification: DfT category B

History
- Original company: Midland Counties Railway, Birmingham and Derby Junction Railway, North Midland Railway
- Pre-grouping: Midland Railway
- Post-grouping: London, Midland and Scottish Railway

Key dates
- 4 June 1839: MCR temporary station opened
- 12 August 1839: B&DJR temporary station opened
- 11 May 1840: NMR permanent station opened as Derby; NCR and B&DJR stations closed
- 1858: Extended
- 1871: Extended
- 25 September 1950: Renamed Derby Midland
- 1952: Partially rebuilt
- 6 May 1968: Renamed Derby
- 1985: Partially rebuilt
- 2005–2009: Major renovations
- 2018: Remodelled

Passengers
- 2020/21: ▼0.904 million
- Interchange: ▼0.105 million
- 2021/22: ▲2.952 million
- Interchange: ▲0.411 million
- 2022/23: ▲3.377 million
- Interchange: ▼0.403 million
- 2023/24: ▲3.496 million
- Interchange: ▲0.516 million
- 2024/25: ▲4.107 million
- Interchange: ▲0.608 million
Location
Notes
- Passenger statistics from the Office of Rail and Road

Derby (/ˈdɑːrbi/, also known as Derby Midland) is a main line railway station serving the city of Derby, in Derbyshire, England. It lies 127 miles (204 km) north of London St Pancras on the Midland Main Line. Owned by Network Rail and managed by East Midlands Railway, the station is also served by CrossCountry services. It is the busiest station in Derbyshire and the third busiest station in the East Midlands. It is situated to the south-east of Derby city centre, close to the west bank of the River Derwent.

== Overview ==
The decision by the Midland Railway to have its headquarters in Derby made the town a busy node of the rail network. First opened in 1839, it was at the time one of the largest stations in the country and was unusual for being shared by more than one company. Until its closure in 1990, Derby Railway Works, consisting of major carriage and locomotive workshops, as well as the Research Division in the Railway Technical Centre were housed there.

The station is an interchange point between the Midland Main Line from London St Pancras to Leeds, and long-distance services on the Cross Country Route from Edinburgh Waverley through Birmingham New Street to Plymouth or Reading.

Local services from Nottingham to Matlock, along the Derwent Valley line, serve the station, as well as local and semi-fast services to Stoke-on-Trent, Crewe, Birmingham New Street and Cardiff Central.

Derby station has six platforms in regular use, connected by a footbridge which is used as an exit to Pride Park and a car park.

In 2018, the station was remodelled and resignalled as part of a major upgrade programme. A bay platform was removed and a new island built on the site of the former goods lines and carriage sidings. At the same time, the remaining platforms were straightened. The updated design has separated the London and Birmingham lines allowing more movements to pass through the station and has increased line speed through all the platforms. There is a service platform (numbered 7), which was used for passenger services during the initial phase of the project, but is not in regular service.

== History ==
=== Early East Midlands railway schemes ===
After the building of the Stockton and Darlington Railway in 1825, a number of ambitious projects for long-distance lines between cities had been mooted. Among these was a line between London and Edinburgh, for both goods and passengers, via Bedford and Leeds, passing in between Carlisle and Newcastle.

Meanwhile, a number of short lines were built for specific purposes. Among these were the Mansfield and Pinxton and the Leicester and Swannington. The Mansfield and Pinxton was a feeder for a canal and was a wagonway, but these short lines were pivotal in later events. Possibly the longest was the Cromford and High Peak Railway, opened in 1833, to connect the Cromford Canal with the Peak Forest Canal. It attracted interest because it provided access to Manchester through the Peak District of Derbyshire, even today an obstacle to transport.

In the 1830s, lines were already in progress between Bristol and London and from each to Birmingham and thence to Liverpool and Manchester, and their promoters were looking ahead. Three schemes came to the fore for the East Midlands. The Midland Grand Junction Railway would connect Birmingham with Sheffield and Derby, with a branch to Nottingham and another branch from Sheffield to Manchester. There would also be a line to the East Coast at Goole. In 1824, the London Northern Railway Company was formed to link Birmingham, Derby, Nottingham, Hull and Manchester with London. Two options were proposed. One would branch at Loughborough, with branches for Nottingham and Derby, and proceeding to Manchester by the Cromford and High Peak Railway. The other option would pass through Northampton, with a branch to Birmingham, go on to Derby, with a branch to Nottingham, and thence to the Cromford and High Peak. The Grand Midland Railway was a proposal to branch from the London to Birmingham railway, already under consideration, at Northampton, and bring it through Leicester, Loughborough and Derby to the Cromford and High Peak.

Towards the end of the 1820s, the economic climate of the country had deteriorated and many investors were waiting to see how the new Liverpool and Manchester Railway would succeed. What investment that was forthcoming was for ventures with a reasonable expectation of a good, and rapid, return. Although the surveys were useful in the planning of later lines, the three lines were never built.

Derby investors, naturally, favoured the scheme by the Midland Grand Junction to connect through Derby (at what was to be called the Grand Central Station) to the Cromford and High Peak Railway and thence to Manchester, since the London Northern would pass through Sandiacre some ten miles away. In the event neither line was built; the Cromford and High Peak Railway was not ideally suited to passenger working, and an alternative via Bakewell and Chapel-en-le-Frith would encounter very difficult terrain. (Manchester was not, in fact, reached until later in the century by the Manchester, Buxton, Matlock and Midland Junction Railway and its extensions.)

=== Three railways ===
The Midland Counties Railway was originally proposed to connect the Mansfield and Pinxton Railway to Leicester to supply coal. However, supplies provided by the canal network and the River Trent to Nottingham, meant that few people were willing to invest.

Provision of coal supplies to Derby were via the Derby Canal but this had not been a resounding success. People in Derby were supportive of any scheme which would bring a railway to the town.

George Hudson encouraged the building of North Midland Railway, later becoming its chairman. Meanwhile, financiers in Birmingham, including G. C. Glyn, a banker and chairman of the London and Birmingham Railway, were looking to expand their system. The Birmingham and Derby Junction Railway would give it a link from Yorkshire to London, with access to the coalfields.

The promoters of the Midland Counties Railway suggested a line linking Nottingham, Derby and Leicester, with an extension to Rugby for London. Their original plan in 1833 had been to bring their line to Derby at Darby's Yard and Exeter Gardens, at the east side of the present Market Place, with a bridge over the Derwent. Following Vignoles's reassessment in 1835 a new route was proposed, either north or south of the Derby Canal to a terminus near St. Mary's Bridge with a branch to Full Street near to John Lombe's Silk Mill. Both options would cross the North Midland lines north of the latter's station.

The North Midland planned to build their station near Nottingham Road, avoiding a river bridge, while the Birmingham and Derby planned to build theirs nearby. They realised the value of a link with the North Midland, and decided to bridge the river and share its station. In 1836 the town council suggested a single station for all three companies and the Midland Counties agreed.

One site considered was an island bounded by the River Derwent and the canal, called The Holmes, now Bass's Recreation Ground. The space was restricted and susceptible to flooding, and the trackwork would be complicated. The selected site was further south on the west bank, Borough's Fields, in Litchurch, at the southern side of the Castlefields estate. It was a mile from the town, but the council built a carriageway to the town centre, along Siddals Lane (now Siddals Road). The station was built by the North Midland, with the other two companies renting spaces. The whole arrangement was confirmed by the North Midland Railway Act 1839.

=== The Tri Junct Station ===
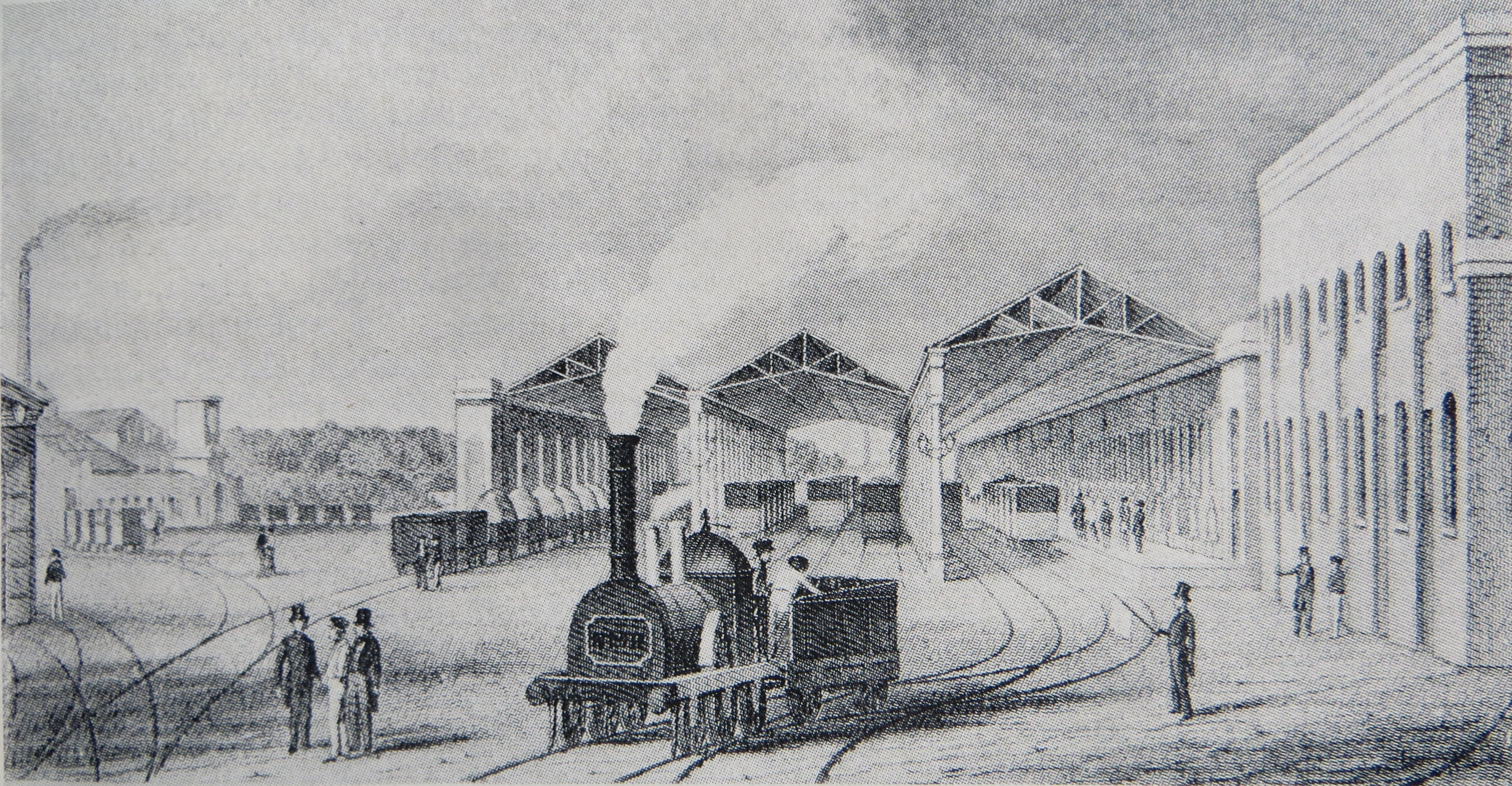
Derby Station North Midland Railway

Although some sources refer to it as the 'Tripartite Station'. it became known as the 'Tri Junct Station', It was 1,050 ft (320 m) long, with one through platform plus a north and a south bay; the main platform and bays were connected to seven stabling roads by a series of carriage turntables (rolling-stock was moved around the station by hand). These platform and stabling roads were all beneath a three-bay train shed.

Whishaw described it thus:

The admirably contrived and elegant roofs, the spacious, the great length of the whole erection extending to upwards of a thousand feet. All unite in rendering it the most complete structure of the kind in the United Kingdom or perhaps the world.

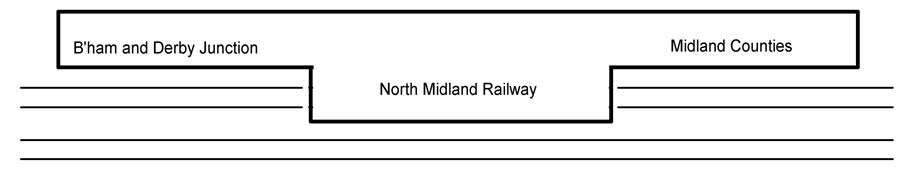
Sketch diagram showing platform arrangement when first opened

The platform was in three parts with the centre section built forward as in the diagram, which allowed trains some freedom of movement. With one platform for passengers to board and alight, it was not necessary for them to cross running lines when changing trains. The station offices were also partitioned into three sections, each line having its own facilities.

Fronting this was a magnificent two-storey stone building designed by Francis Thompson. The North Midland also built a cluster of workers' houses of which the present Midland Terrace, Railway Terrace and Calvert Street remain preserved as a conservation area. These are thought to be the oldest railway workers' houses in the world, these were saved from demolition in the 1970s by local architect Derek Latham and was one of the early projects completed by the Derbyshire Historic Building Trust.

At each end was a hotel. The Midland Hotel, for first class passengers, is said to be the first provincial railway hotel following on after that at Euston in London. The Brunswick Inn was for second class passengers and railway workers. The saying went that patrons of the first chatted about hunting and shooting, of the other, shunting and hooting.

The first public departure from a temporary platform was on 4 June 1839 when a Midland Counties train ran to Nottingham (the inaugural run having taken place from Nottingham on the 30th). The first train to Birmingham departed on 12 August in the same year, from another temporary platform further south. The Tri Junct Station finally opened when the North Midland line was completed to Rotherham Masborough on 11 May 1840, reaching Leeds seven weeks later. The station's official name was Derby Station.

=== Midland Railway ===
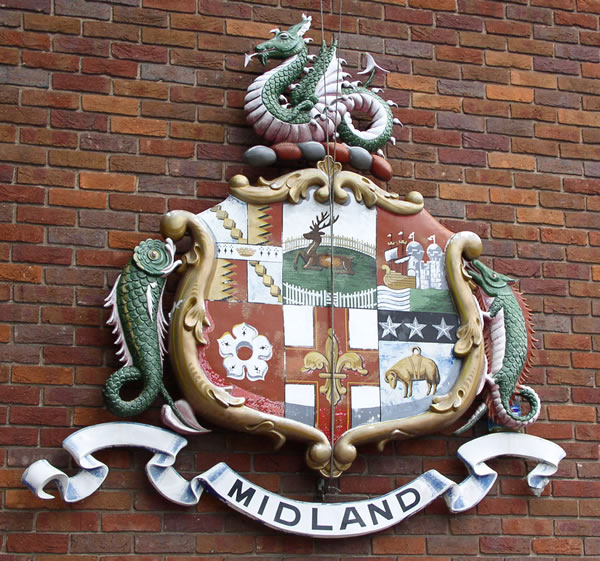
The Midland Railway's coat of arms at the station's entrance

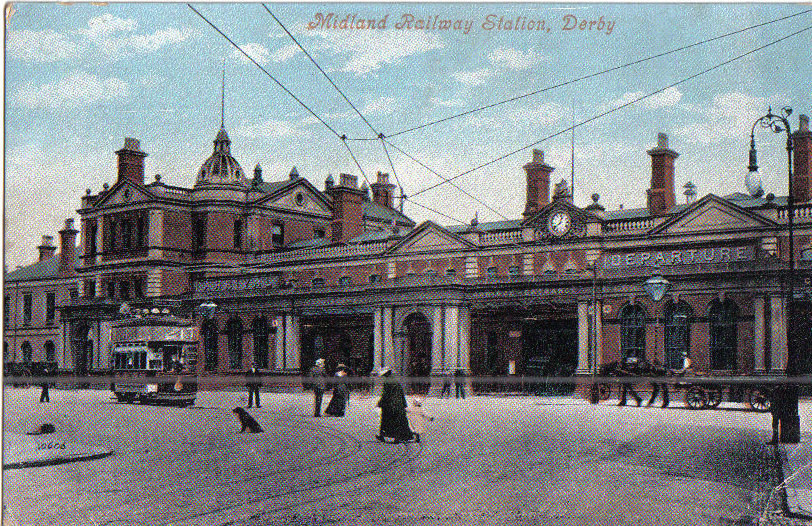
The Victorian frontage to the station by Charles Trubshaw

In 1844, all three railways amalgamated to become the Midland Railway, with headquarters at Derby station. Joseph Paxton, a director of the railway, produced his first sketch for the Crystal Palace during a board meeting there. The North Midland repair shop and two locomotive sheds formed the Midland's main locomotive works.

In 1846, a north facing spur (Derby North Junction) was added from the Midland Counties line. In 1867 a loop was added to the south, allowing through running for trains from London. The original section was closed in 1969. The junction to the south is called London Road.

In 1857, the Midland Railway experimentally laid the first rails made of steel rather than cast iron at Derby station, made by the metallurgist Robert Forester Mushet. They were laid down at a particularly heavily used part of the station approach where the iron rails had to be renewed at least every six months, and occasionally every three. Six years later, in 1863, the rail seemed as perfect as ever, although some 500 trains had passed over it daily.

In 1858, the station was extended with extra offices, improved facilities and a porte-cochère for carriages, designed by John Holloway Saunders, the Midland Railway architect. An island platform, the present 2 and 3, was added which was accessed via a level crossing from platform 1.

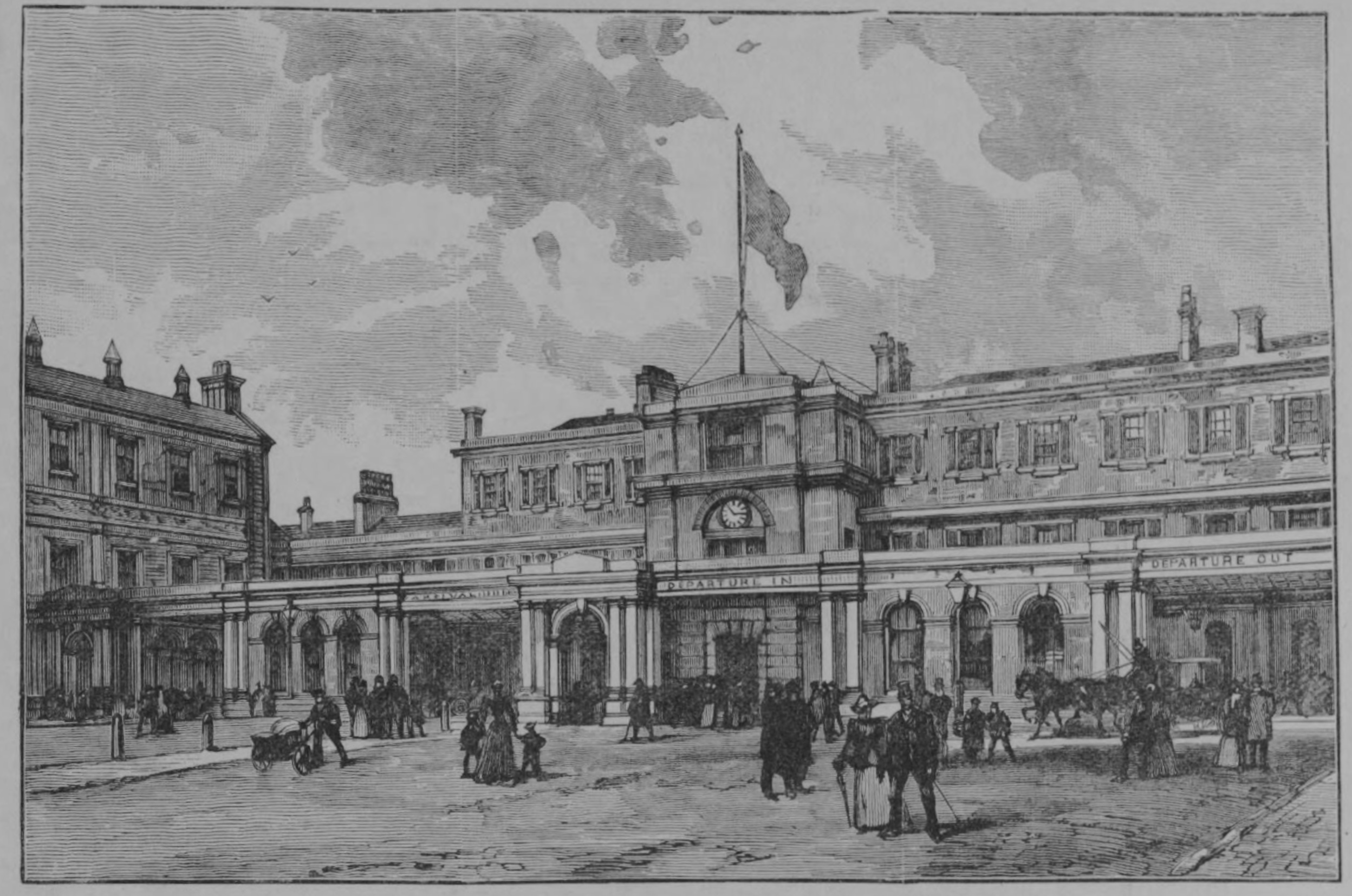
From the Illustrated London News 30 May 1891

In 1881, platforms 4 to 6 (with 5 being a bay to the south) were added, being 850 feet (260 m) long and 45 feet (14 m) wide. The level crossing which gave access from platforms 1 to 2 was removed and access provided by a new footbridge 16 feet (4.9 m) wide with staircases down to each platform. Platforms 2 and 3 were lengthened by about 350 feet (110 m) and new waiting rooms and refreshment rooms were provided, designed by the company architect John Holloway Sanders. A subway was installed to allow better transfer of luggage between platforms with hydraulic lifts to raise and lower luggage. The turntables were removed and replaced by scissors crossovers, the whole complex controlled by a signal box on the centre platform.

The frontage and offices were rebuilt around 1892 to designs by the architect of the Midland Railway, Charles Trubshaw.

The station, and railway workshops adjoining it, were the target of a Zeppelin bombing raid during World War I in 1916, though only slight damage was inflicted.

=== London, Midland and Scottish Railway ===
The main line on which Derby station lay was that from London to Manchester, carrying named expresses such as the Palatine and the Peaks, while trains to Leeds and Scotland tended to use the Erewash Valley Line and expresses to Edinburgh, such as The Waverley travelled through Corby and Nottingham. The line from Leeds was nevertheless busy with trains to the south west and Cornwall, and summer specials to Paignton and Torquay. It had a named express, the Devonian, which ran from Bradford to Bristol.

On 15 January 1941, during World War II, the station was attacked again, becoming one of the few locations in Derby to suffer significant bomb damage. The overall roof of the train shed and platform six were severely damaged, with the loss of most of the rest of the glass, although the Victorian frontage of the station survived.

=== British Railways ===
The station was renamed Derby Midland on 25 September 1950. It was extensively rebuilt between 1952 and 1954 using pre-stressed concrete. The cost of the modernisation plan was £200,000 (equivalent to £5,010,000 in 2025). The station signal box was also rebuilt, described by the staff as 'a cupboard under the stairs'. In 1954, part of the roof was replaced by concrete awnings.

From 6 May 1968, the station was renamed Derby on timetables and platforms, though the full name of Derby Midland was retained on the station's main sign. Even today, the fuller name is sometimes used, including on the modern main sign (erected 1985) and on the station's electronic departures board.

Derby station excluding goods roads and sidings, showing provision for bidirectional working for any platform, prior to 2018 reconstruction

With the advent of power signalling in 1969, the signal box and the crossovers disappeared, and the tracks approaching the station were relaid to allow trains from any direction to enter or leave any platform. The original Midland Counties Railway route from the north end of the station to Spondon Junction via Chaddesden sidings was closed as part of this work (trains travelling between Nottingham & stations towards Birmingham must now reverse at the station).

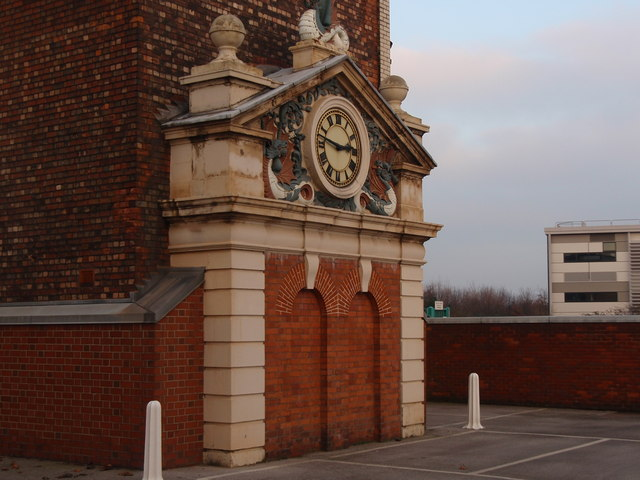
The Victorian station clock, now in the car park

The Victorian station entrance and booking hall, that dated back to 1840, was demolished in 1985. The new travel centre officially opened on 15 January 1986. The entrance's original clock was moved to the north end of the car park. The coats of arms of the Midland Railway and of the City of Derby was fixed to the frontage of the new replacement booking hall and entrance. The decision to demolish the old building was a controversial one at the time.

=== Post-privatisation ===
Upon the privatisation of British Rail, the station became owned by Railtrack and later Network Rail. Day-to-day operation was initially with Midland Mainline, which refurbished it with the installation of a large electronic departure board in the station entrance hall and smaller boards on all platforms. The station is now managed by East Midlands Railway.

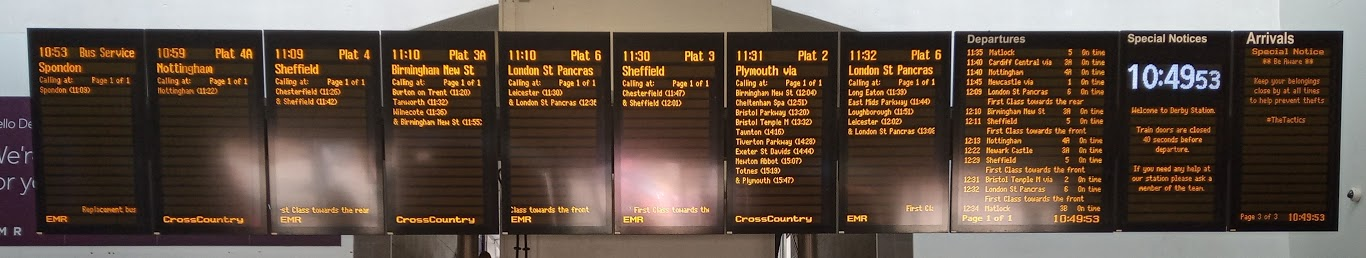
The station's departures board

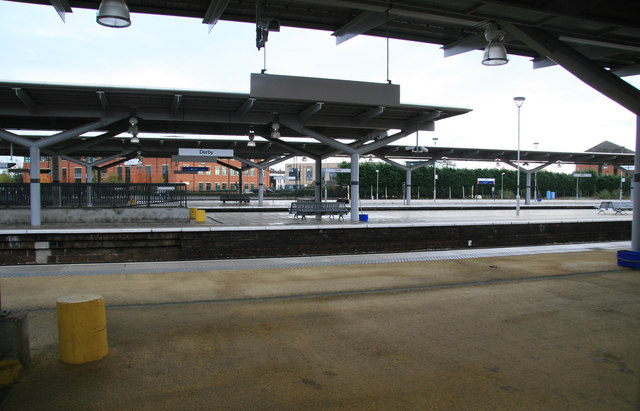
The station's platforms

In 2005, the footbridge connecting the platforms, which had been temporarily supported for at least 30 years, was replaced. Whilst doing this, engineers discovered that there were stresses in the concrete of the 1950s canopy. Work to demolish the canopies and erect new ones began in mid-2007 and was completed in October 2009.

A £15m signalling centre, the Derby Rail Operating Centre, (formerly known as East Midlands Control Centre), was opened immediately south of the station on 3 April 2008. This replaced the 1960s-era panel boxes here and at Trent Junction (near Nottingham), plus the 1986 one at Leicester and various small manual & panel boxes elsewhere in the area. When fully complete, it will be one of 12 and supervise over 350 route miles of railway.

==== Footbridge ====
On 14 February 2001, Derby City Council, Midland Mainline and Railtrack agreed a £1,736,000-scheme to connect Derby Midland station to the Pride Park development. Derby City Council provided £270,000 to extend the station footbridge to reach Pride Park and the car park. Railtrack and Midland Main Line entered into a Covenant With Regard to the Footbridge, that the non-travelling public are free to cross during station hours with exceptions for Christmas Day and Boxing day, and a proviso that the footbridge does not become a public right of way.

On 21 June 2007, East Midlands Trains took over the franchise. Under the franchise agreement East Midlands Trains was required to install automatic ticket gate lines at Derby station.

On 3 April 2009, East Midlands Trains sought an amendment from Derby City Council to install gates to "reduce unauthorised use of trains and improve security". Derby City Council consented but required removal within 42 days should East Midlands Trains be found in non-compliance of the additional terms. Ticket barriers were introduced on 18 August 2009. The barriers must be left open if they are not staffed at both ends, and ad hoc usage of the footbridge must be allowed at all other times.

==== Pass scheme ====
Before the start of barrier introduction, posters and a roadshow were held, introducing a pass scheme for footbridge users. The publicity resulted in over 800 pass requests in the first weeks before gating. The pass scheme covers non-rail pedestrians and cyclists travelling "from Pride Park to central Derby or vice-versa". The agreement requires EMT to make application forms available online as well as at Derby station. Pass applications at the station are processed immediately, and all other applications are posted out within 48 hours. There is no administration charge for issuing or renewing of passes, with a charge of £5.00 for replacing each lost pass. Passes not swiped at each end of the bridge are revoked. Derby City Council may audit withdrawn passes.

=== Improvement works in 2018 ===
The station layout was significantly remodelled during 2018, work which involved a partial closure of the station from 22 July to 7 October. The original platform 5 (a bay, accessed from the south end of the station) was removed and a new island platform constructed. The original platform 6 was renumbered 5, and the faces of the new island platform were numbered 6 and 7, though the latter is not used in day-to-day operations.

The station area and its approaches were resignalled and the track layout improved, allowing significantly faster line speeds in the area. Following the upgrade, most London services use platforms 5 and 6, while the north-east to south-west CrossCountry services normally use platforms 1 and 2. Other services, such as those serving Nottingham, Crewe and Cardiff, use platforms 3 and 4.

== Facilities ==
Derby station has lifts providing step-free access to all platforms from both ends of the station. Platform 1 is accessible directly from the main ticket hall; alternatively, there is also a subway tunnel running from platform 1 to the platform 4/5 island. There are public toilets on all platforms, but does not currently have a "changing places toilet" with space and special facilities for those who need them.

The ticket office is open from 06:00 to 21:00 each day. Ticket machines are available along the outside wall and by the barriers. In the main ticket hall, there is a Costa Pronto outlet, a WHSmith and a Greggs. There are cash points next to WHSmiths and two coffee outlets on the platforms.

Outside of the main entrance there is a bus stop served by Arriva Derby and Kinchbus. There is also a taxi rank and a pick up/drop off area in the car park of the Midland Hotel.

The rear entrance has a pick up/drop off area, turning circle and a short-stay car park, limited to 20 minutes.

== Services ==
A map of East Midlands Railway's InterCity and Connect services showing the current service pattern each hour

Derby is served by two train operating companies; typical off-peak services in trains per hour (tph) are as follows:

East Midlands Railway

- 2 tph to London St Pancras
- 2 tph to Sheffield
- 1 tph to Crewe, via Stoke-on-Trent
- 1 tph to Matlock
- 1 tph to Lincoln (semi-fast); of which:
  - 1 tp2h continues to Cleethorpes
- 1 tph to Lincoln, via Nottingham (stopping service).

CrossCountry

- 1 tph to Edinburgh Waverley, with occasional extensions to Glasgow Central, Aberdeen or Dundee
- 1 tp2h to Newcastle, via Doncaster
- 1 tph to Plymouth, via Bristol Temple Meads, with occasional extensions to Penzance
- 1 tp2h to Reading
- 2 tph to Nottingham
- 2 tph to Birmingham New Street; of which:
  - 1 tph continues to Gloucester and Cardiff Central.

Preceding station	National Rail	Following station
Tamworth	CrossCountry Scotland and the North East to the South West and South Coast	Sheffield
Burton-on-Trent	CrossCountry Scotland and the North East to the South West and South Coast	Sheffield
Birmingham New Street	CrossCountry Reading – Newcastle	Sheffield
Willington	CrossCountry Cardiff – Birmingham – Nottingham	Spondon Limited service
Burton-on-Trent	CrossCountry Cardiff – Birmingham – Nottingham	Nottingham
Chesterfield	East Midlands Railway Midland Main Line	Long Eaton
Chesterfield	East Midlands Railway Midland Main Line	Loughborough
Chesterfield	East Midlands Railway Midland Main Line	Leicester
Tutbury and Hatton	East Midlands Railway Crewe–Derby line	Long Eaton
Peartree Limited Service	East Midlands Railway Crewe–Derby line	Long Eaton
Duffield	East Midlands Railway Derwent Valley line	Spondon
Duffield	East Midlands Railway Derwent Valley line	Terminus
	Disused railways	
Terminus	Regional Railways Ramsline Halt	Ramsline Halt
Peartree	Central Trains; Sinfin branch line	Duffield
