= Sinfin =

Suburb of Derby, England

Coordinates: 52.883°N 1.487°W

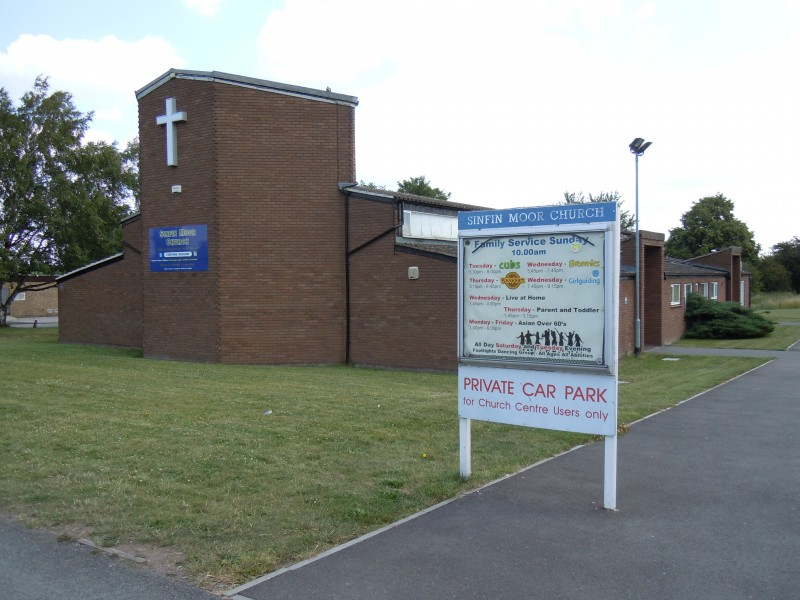
- Sinfin Moor Church

- Location within Derbyshire
- Population: 15,128 (2011 Census)
- Unitary authority: Derby
- Ceremonial county: Derbyshire
- Region: East Midlands
- Country: England
- Sovereign state: United Kingdom
- Post town: DERBY
- Postcode district: DE24
- Dialling code: 01332
- Police: Derbyshire
- Fire: Derbyshire
- Ambulance: East Midlands
- UK Parliament: Derby South

Sinfin is a suburb of Derby, in Derbyshire, England, 3 miles (4.8 km) southwest of the city centre on its southern outskirts. The ward, which includes Osmaston as well as Sinfin itself, had a population of 15,128 in 2011. Historically, Sinfin and Osmaston were separate villages before being swallowed up by the expansion of Derby. Osmaston is characterised by inter-war housing developments while much of the housing in Sinfin is post-war. Between the two suburbs lies a more industrialised area dominated by the Rolls-Royce works.

== History ==
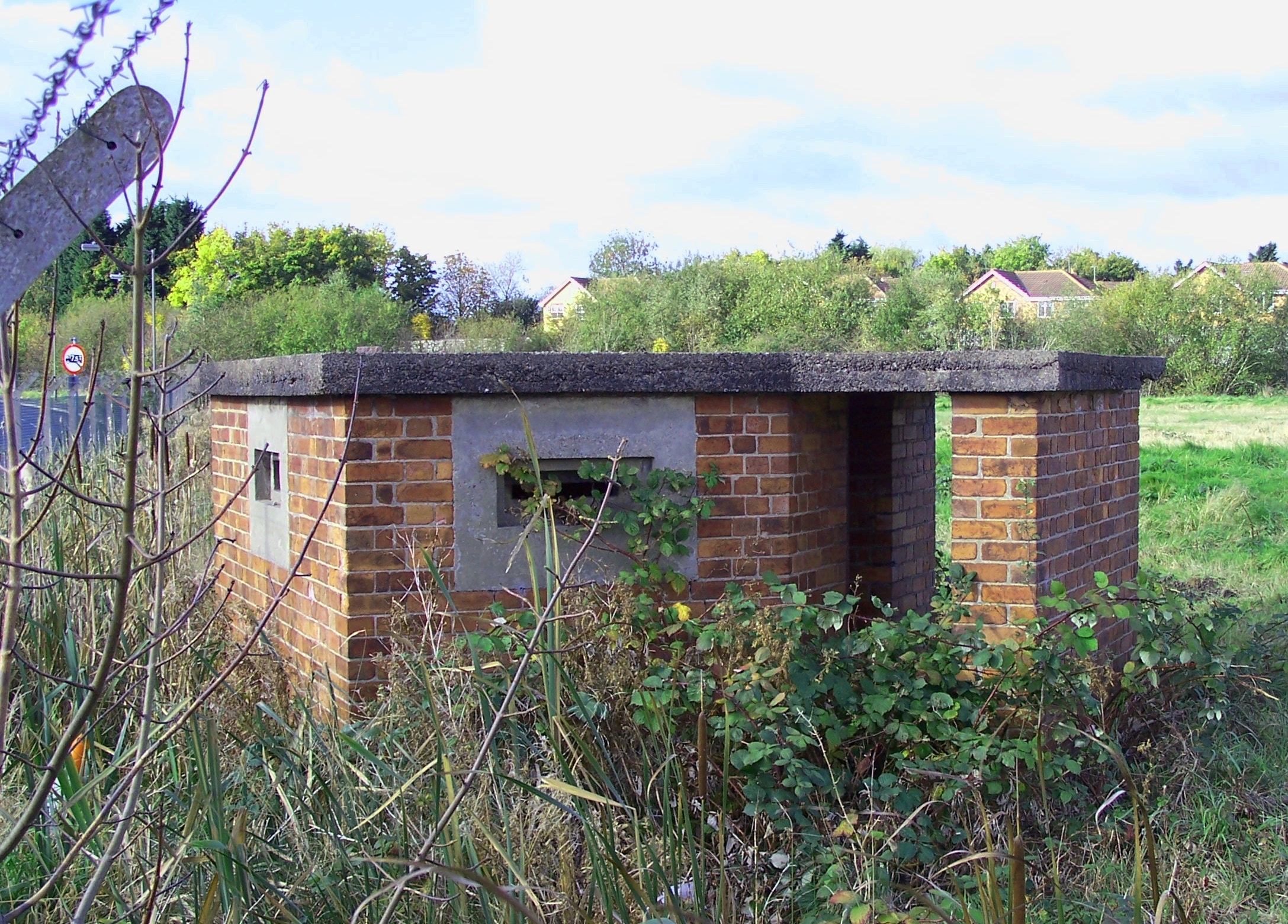
Pillbox Goodsmoor Road

Sinfin is recorded in the Domesday Book produced in 1086 as Sedenfeld as a manor that belonged to baron Henry de Ferrers. Mention is made of two carucates of land assessed to the geld; land for one plough and two villeins having another and of 6 acres (2.4 ha) of meadow. The land was valued at ten shillings. Its undertenant was named William, later William de Rolleston, a vassal to Henry de Ferrers, who displaced a Saxon thegn named Ulfkell. Today the Ferrers name is still seen in Sinfin.

Sinfin now has two distinct areas – the "new" and the "old"; it also merges with the Stenson Fields district of South Derbyshire to the south. The "old" part is bordered to the north by the Derby – Crewe railway. Here, at the outset of WW2, was built a substantial ordnance depot. This was protected by a series of pillboxes, gun emplacements and barrage balloons. Most of this is now built over but some evidence remains.

It once had a railway passenger station — Sinfin Central railway station — at which passenger trains last called in May 1993.

== Government ==
Sinfin is one of the seventeen electoral wards which make up Derby, and as such elects three councillors to Derby City Council. As of the 2015 local elections, all three councillors for the area represent the Labour Party. It is one of seven Derby wards that form the Derby South constituency in the House of Commons of the United Kingdom Parliament.

== Demography ==
According to the 2011 Census, Sinfin ward had a population of 15,128. This was a 9.77% increase on the 2001 Census figure of 13,782.

== Community facilities ==
The 24 hectare (60 acres) Sinfin Moor Local Nature Reserve lies on the southern edge of the community.

== Education ==
Secondary schools serving the Sinfin area include City of Derby Academy.

Primary schools serving the Sinfin area include Redwood Primary School, Ash Croft Primary Academy, Grampian Primary School, and Stenson Fields Primary School.

== Religious sites ==
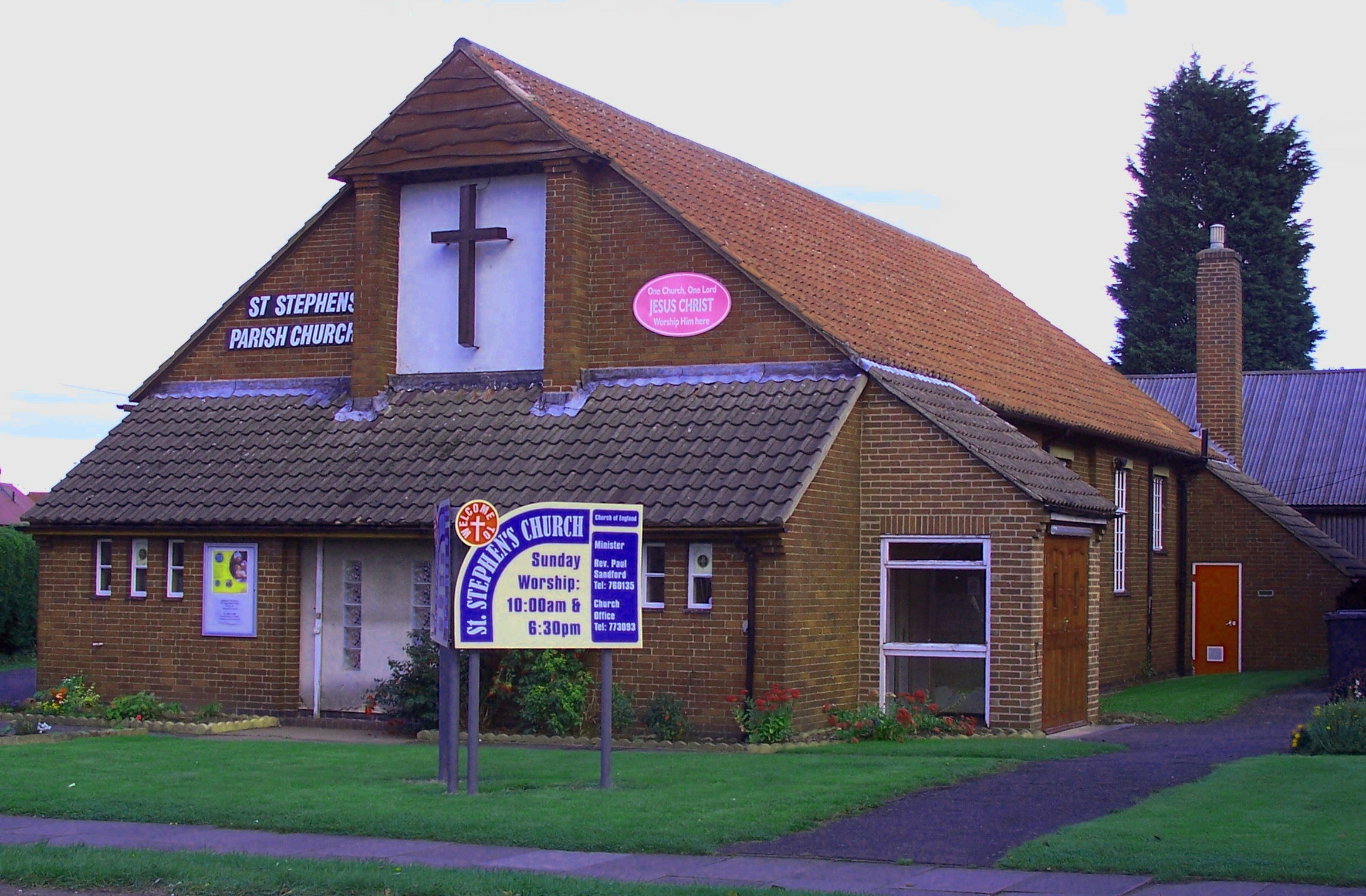
St Stephen's Church

St Stephen's Parish Church serves the parish of Sinfin

Sinfin Moor Church was built in 1970 and is a Local Ecumenical Partnership. This means that people from three denominations worship there: Methodists, Anglicans and United Reformed Church. There is also a Roman Catholic church, a church centre and, at the older part of Sinfin, St Stephen's Church.

== Notable people ==
- Ted Moult – TV Personality in 1950s and 60s.

== See also ==
- Listed buildings in Derby (Blagreaves and Sinfin Wards)

== Gallery ==
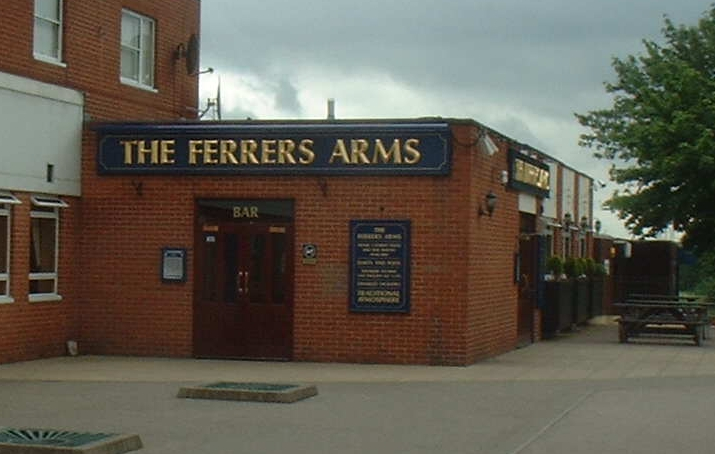
The Ferrers Arms Bar

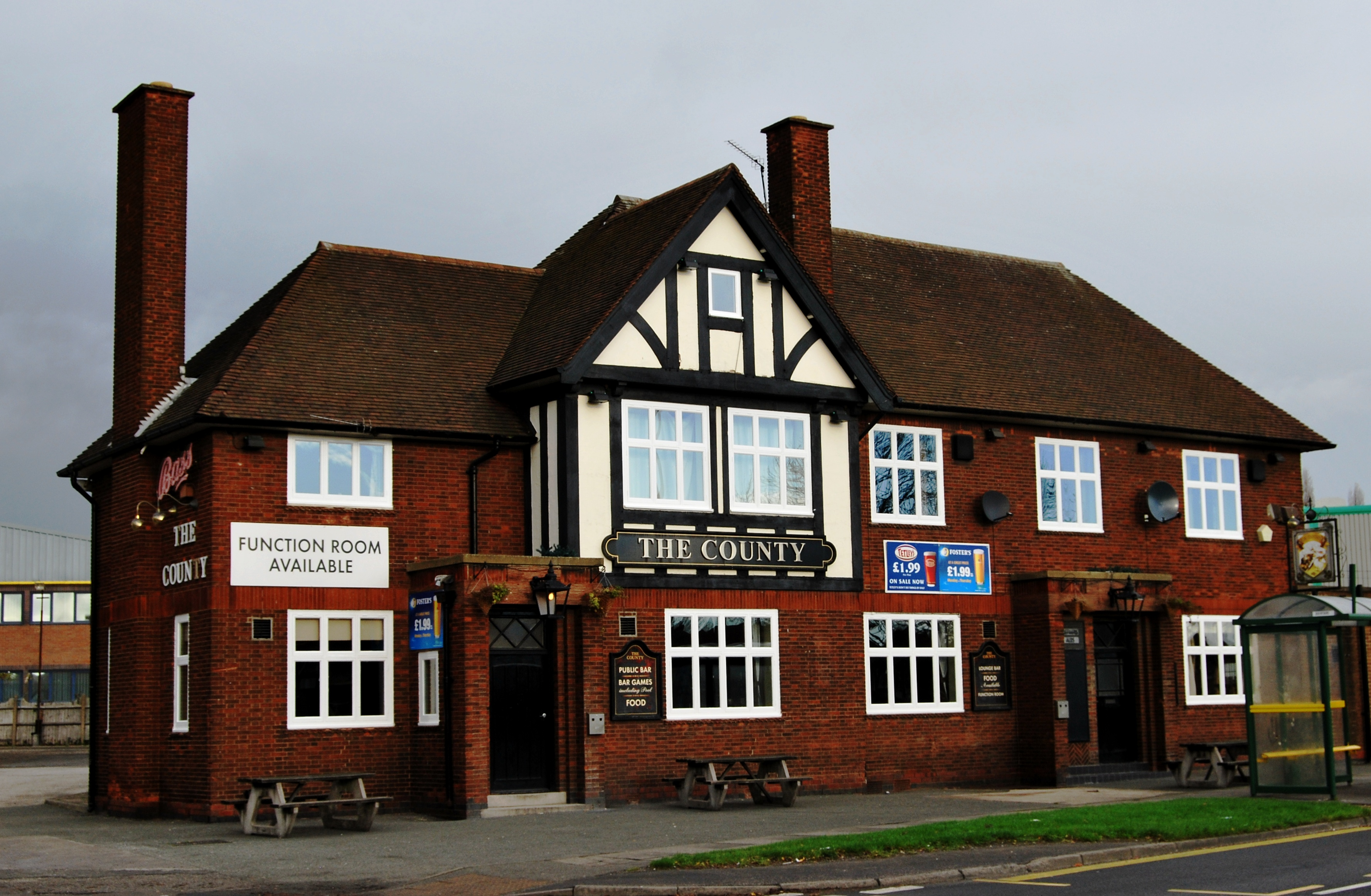
The County Pub, Sinfin

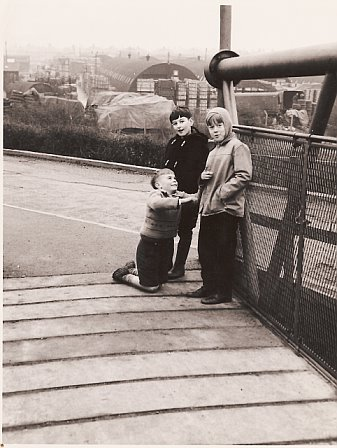
Goodsmoor Bridge overlooking the Ordnance depot, circa 1964
