= Carlton le Willows Academy =

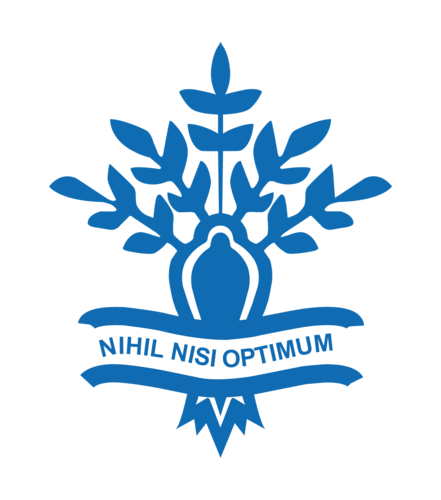

Location
- Wood Lane; Gedling, Nottinghamshire, NG4 4AA; England; 52.9753°N 1.0702°W

Information
- Type: Academy
- Motto: Latin: Nihil Nisi Optimum (Nothing but the best)
- Established: 1953
- Local authority: Nottinghamshire County Council
- Trust: Delta Academies Trust
- Department for Education URN: 136627 Tables
- Ofsted: Reports
- Chair of Governors: P. Brown
- Head teacher: Jas Mehat
- Staff: 135 (2016–2017)
- Gender: Mixed
- Age range: 11–18
- Enrolment: 1,590 (2019)
- Capacity: 1,445
- Campus size: 32 acres (13 ha)
- Houses: Ash; Birch; Cedar; Oak
- Publication: Le Willows Life
- Website: www.clwacademy.co.uk

Carlton le Willows Academy is an 11–18 mixed, secondary school and sixth form with academy status in Gedling, Nottinghamshire, England. It is part of the Delta Academies Trust.

Recruiting its first pupils in 1953, on-site teaching was introduced in the following year and the school was officially opened in 1956. Consequently, the modern school speculates Carlton le Willows to have been founded as the first post-war grammar school in England. Its campus was split from 1962 when a separate secondary technical school, Carlton le Willows Technical Grammar School, was established. The schools unified in 1973 and converted to a single comprehensive school; two local secondary modern schools, both founded in the early 20th-century, were also implicated in the merger. Carlton le Willows was granted specialist Technology College status from 2002 until 2010, became a foundation school in 2007 and converted into an academy in 2011.

It operates on a single, 32-acre (13 ha) campus and its teaching follows the National Curriculum. Pupils generally sit examinations for around eight General Certificate of Secondary Education (GCSE) qualifications, or equivalent diplomas, in Year Eleven (aged 15–16). Pupils have a choice to study three or four GCE Advanced Levels (A Levels) if they are admitted into the sixth form, though more vocational courses remain available.

== History ==
=== Demand and origins ===
Demand for secondary education in the Carlton Urban District was prevalent from about 1904, though proposals were consistently rejected by the superior Nottinghamshire County Council. Lamenting transport costs to the nearest provider, the Henry Mellish Grammar School in Bulwell, it was again suggested in 1934 that the County Council commit to the establishment of a secondary school, a concept dismissed by the then-Chairman of the District Council as being "a long way off". However, it was also stressed that advocates should "stick to it". By 1949, focus switched to endorsing an accessible grammar school, encouraged by a post-war population increase connected to the developing coal and light engineering sector in western Nottinghamshire. As discontent surfaced once more upon the attainment of scholarships by 71 local schoolchildren to remote institutions, it was clarified that County authorities had finally agreed to the foundation of a secondary school. It was to be based in Gedling, rather than neighbouring Carlton; despite this, Gedling was likewise within the Carlton Urban District, which encompassed the area known parochially as Carlton-le-Willows.

=== Grammar schools: 1952–1973 ===
==== Grammar school ====
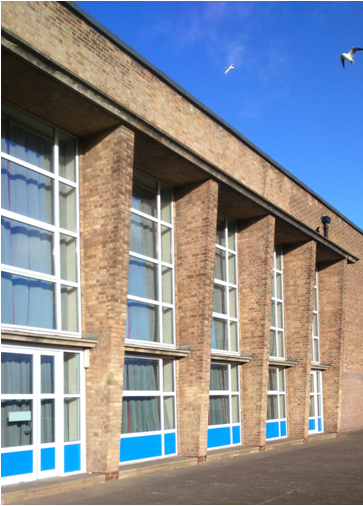
The original grammar school building has been noted for its "strong proportions and blonde brickwork"

Demanding £173,793, construction of a new grammar school began in 1952. The building was designed by County Architect E. W. Roberts to comfortably accommodate 540 pupils, anticipating that a sixth form would be established as its pupils matured. Architectural historian Elain Harwood demonstrates that Roberts repeated the same design at other schools both before Carlton le Willows' foundation and until his retirement in December 1954, describing its "strong proportions and blonde brickwork" as "impressive". In-line with Roberts' formula, generous acreage, permitting a large playing field, was secured for Carlton le Willows that year with the County Council's acquisition of War Department land once allotted to the adjacent Gedling House, which was built for the Smith banking family in the late 18th to early 19th–century.

The school's students were to be provided with four laboratories (dedicated to biology, chemistry, physics and general science respectfully) in addition to rooms for art, domestic science, metalwork, needlework and woodwork. Ten general classrooms were also planned, alongside three intended sixth form rooms and a gymnasium. Designs further permitted staff and prefect rooms, a well equipped library and an assembly hall. The threat of mining subsidence meant that all structures were reinforced with concrete beams capable of carrying the building's weight. Appointees hoped that these furnishings would fulfil the main purpose of the school, which was to reduce travelling distances while still providing for scholars from as far afield as Beeston.

During a period of intense construction in 1953, Carlton le Willows recruited its first pupils, consisting of two single-sex forms. They were initially educated elsewhere; the boys at the Henry Mellish Grammar School and the girls at the West Brigford Grammar School, until co-educational, on-campus teaching was introduced in September 1954. Carlton le Willows Grammar School was officially opened on 30 June 1956 with a speech from educationalist Sir John Wolfenden. The modern school contends it was the first post-war grammar school founded in Nottinghamshire and speculates it may have been the first in England altogether. Managing a contingent of just over 500 by 1967, it had three headmasters in all; Stephen Marshall (1953–57), Leonard Thomas Draycott (1958–67) and T. E. Dowman (1968–73), who also led the grammar school's comprehensive successor up to his retirement in 1988.

==== Technical grammar school ====
The erection of a secondary technical institution, Carlton le Willows Technical Grammar School, was completed in September 1962 and occurred on the same 45-acre site as the main grammar school, albeit in a different building developed through the Consortium of Local Authorities Special Programme (CLASP). Contracted in January 1961 for £202,310 under the supervision of County Architect W. D. Lacey, the technical school promised compartmentalised accommodation for 510 pupils, including 60 sixth formers. Its proximity to the adjacent grammar school allowed for convenient campus organisation through the sharing of facilities, sporting endeavours and access roads. A secondary modern school was also proposed by the Nottinghamshire Education Authority for the same campus, though its planning was rejected by the Minister of Education, Sir Edward Boyle, on 22 March 1963.

The technical grammar initially admitted 209 pupils, whom were taught by 15 members of staff at the time of the school's official opening on 22 November 1963 by Willoughby Norman, then-Chairman of the Boots Pure Drug Company. Despite differing uniforms, the school shared a similar curriculum with its neighbour, with the exception of instruction in Latin and Ancient Greek; such measures were implemented by W. B. Brigham, who served as its only Headmaster.

=== Comprehensive and academy: 1973–present ===
The Tripartite System of education wound-up in Nottinghamshire during the 1970s. September 1973 saw the amalgamation of the Carlton le Willows grammar and technical schools, alongside two other secondary modern establishments, to form a co-educational comprehensive school. (Note: Having both operated as elementary schools prior to the Education Act 1944; one of these secondary moderns, Chandos Street School in Netherfield had been founded in July 1906 as a boys only institution for 420 pupils, opened by Lord Belper. The other absorbed facility, Carlton Girls' Secondary School, existed from 1915, was officially opened by Parliamentary Secretary to the Board of Education, Herbert Lewis, and had been gender exclusive since July 1937.) The building of one of these secondary moderns, located on Station Road, was annexed by its successor until 1988, when £200,000 of funding from the European Communities (EC) re-purposed the site as a business centre from 1989. Earlier, in 1975, £33,000 was designated as part of an A612 road safety improvement scheme for Carlton le Willows pupils and residents of the adjoining Stoke Lane.

Under the headship of Michael Naisbitt (1989–2009), Carlton le Willows became a specialist Technology College in July 2002. This accreditation was lost in 2010 and the school reorganised as an academy on 1 April 2011, having been a foundation school from 1 September 2007, meaning the school would now receive funding directly from central government rather than a local education authority (LEA) and be run by a trust on behalf of the state. Recent campus developments include the completion of a Learning Resource Centre (LRC) in 2005, a performing arts block in 2007, a dedicated Sixth Form building in 2009 and a table tennis facility in 2016. Craig Weaver has led the school since 2009; he was formerly Headteacher at the Quarrydale Academy.

== Structure ==
=== Governance ===
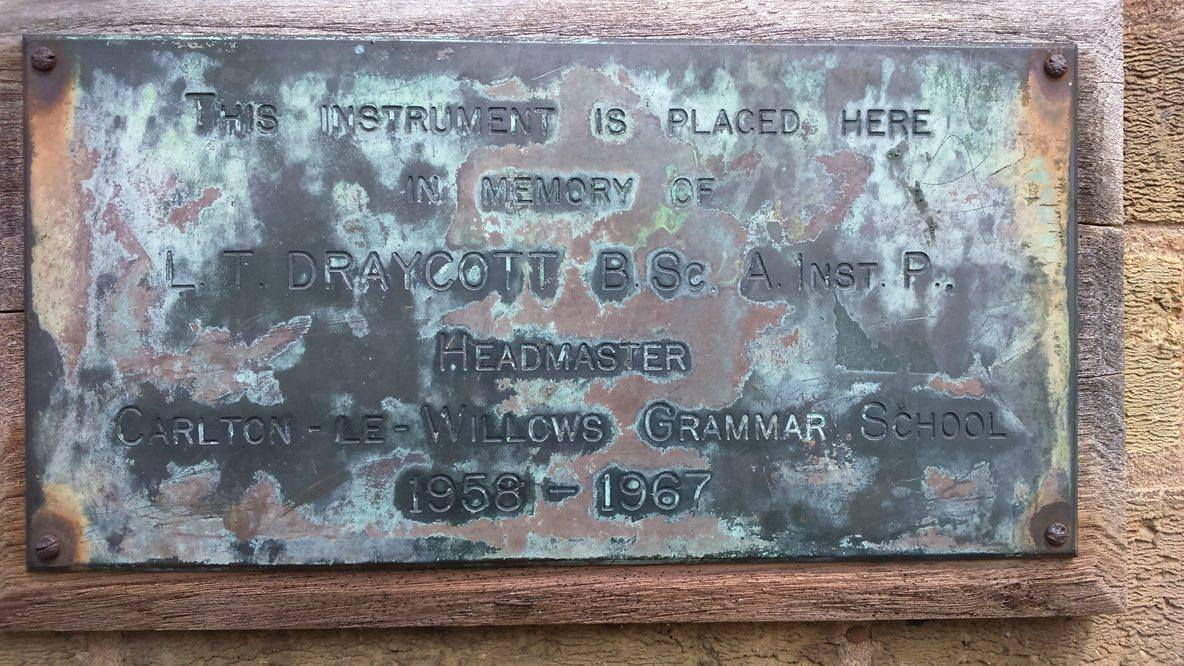
Plaque commemorating Leonard Thomas Draycott, Headmaster from 1958 to 1967

Carlton le Willows is a state-controlled comprehensive secondary school and sixth form serving pupils aged between 11 and 18. It converted to an academy on 1 April 2011 and is overseen by the Greater Nottingham Education Trust, a developing consortium of local institutions; the school is associated with the Redhill Teaching School Alliance, through which its staff often train, as well as Nottinghamshire County Council, which manages its admissions. Day-to-day governance of the school is the responsibility of no fewer than nine and no more than 13 school governors, including at least two parents, up to two members of staff, up to eight individuals appointed by the school trust and the sitting Headteacher; a Parent-Teacher Association (PTA) also offers support through its termly meetings and regular fundraising.

An Office for Standards in Education, Children's Services and Skills (Ofsted) inspection in April 2013 found Carlton le Willows to be a "good" school overall with "outstanding" features, namely in the "behaviour and safety of pupils".

=== Demographics ===
Despite a capacity of 1,445 individuals, the co-educational school operates on a single, 32-acre campus on Wood Lane, Gedling, which 1,513 pupils attended during the 2016–17 academic year: 794 boys and 719 girls. Staff numbers recorded 88 teachers, as well as 20 teaching assistants and 27 general support staff; pupil to teacher ratio was 18.5, above the national average of 15.6. As of May 2013, the majority of scholars come from White British backgrounds and very few pupils speak English as an additional language. The number of pupils supported through allowances, including free school meals (7.7%), is below the national average, as is the number of students with special educational needs. The school's current catchment area comprises partial areas of Carlton and Gedling, along with the entirety of Bulcote, Burton Joyce, Colwick, Netherfield and Stoke Bardolph.

Pupils are allocated into houses, separately comprising around 330 students, based on their forms. The current house system was introduced in September 2010 and consists of Ash, Birch, Cedar and Oak. Each is administrated by members of the teaching staff and appointed house captains, providing pastoral care and encouraging their contingent in an array of inter-house competitions.

=== Admissions ===
As of 2018, the school is able to admit 226 new Year Seven pupils (aged 11) per annum. Upon admission, students are allocated a mixed ability form of varying ages, where they are registered and have access to support from their tutors. Since ratification of the Education Act 2002, Years Seven, Eight and Nine have been grouped into Key Stage 3 and Years Ten and Eleven into Key Stage 4, which co-ordinates how the National Curriculum is taught. The lower school uniform principally consists of a royal blue blazer, embroidered with the school logo, with the option of wearing a V-neck jumper of similar description underneath. Ties must be worn by all students, with relevant colours indicating a pupil's house. Plain black trousers or knee-length pleated skirts are necessitated, as are buttoned white shirts and formal black shoes, as well as black socks or tights.

Separately, around 44% of Key Stage 4 pupils at Carlton le Willows go up to the school's dedicated Sixth Form, and thus Key Stage 5 (comprising years Twelve and Thirteen), numbering 235 in 2013. These students are required to meet minimum General Certificate of Secondary Education (GCSE), or equivalent, grade requirements to access GCE Advanced Level (A Level) or vocational (chiefly Business and Technology Education Council (BTEC)) subject choices, though openings are available to discuss admittance based on exceptional circumstances. The Sixth Form has been based in the purpose-built Michael Naisbitt Sixth Form Centre since July 2009, named after the Headteacher who retired in that year. Sixth formers are not required to wear uniform, but are to adopt a dress code suitable for a professional working environment. This typically consists of trousers, smart jeans or a skirt of a reasonable length; a formal shirt, blouse, smart polo or T-shirt is also acceptable, as is a complementary sweater or cardigan. Footwear requirements demand appropriate boots or smart training shoes.

=== School year ===
The school year runs from September to July, split across three terms: the autumn term (September to December), spring term (January to April) and the summer term (April to July). Students receive two weeks off for Christmas and Easter, a six-week summer break, and three half-term breaks in October, February and May; in addition, the school observes the five nationally scheduled inset days, as well as two public holidays, Good Friday and May Day.

== Curriculum ==
Carlton le Willows Grammar School was originally established to reflect a curriculum comprising Ancient Greek, art, crafts, English, French, geography, history, Latin, mathematics, music, physical education (PE) and religious knowledge. However, the 1960s would also see the institution particularly respected for its teaching of American studies and German. Aside from tutelage in the classics, the secondary technical school shared a broadly comparable curriculum, though subjects were especially instructed "with an emphasis on their relationship to the highly complex technical world" according to its Headmaster, W. B. Brigham, who saw this difference as the most fundamental between the two schools.

More recently, in 2015, The Good Schools Guide commended Carlton le Willows for its instruction of boys in sport and applied sciences; by contrast, in January 2009, the school was one of three listed in an article by The Independent which documented cases judged by the General Teaching Council for England (GTCE) to be instances of incompetent teaching.

=== Key Stages 3 and 4 ===
As of 2018, the school follows the National Curriculum in years Seven to Eleven and offers a range of GCSEs (national exams taken by students aged 14–16) and A Levels (national exams taken by pupils aged 16–18). The school has no affiliation with a particular religious denomination, but religious education is given throughout the school, and pupils may opt to take the subject as part of their GCSE course. Students participate in a number of educational visits and excursions as they progress through the school, with those in years Ten and Eleven being offered tailored careers advice to participate in a work experience program outside of the designated school term. For Key Stage 3 (ages 11–14), almost all pupils study the school's central curriculum, comprising: art, character resilience and well-being, design and technology, drama, English, French (with German as a supplementary option), geography, history, information and communications technology (ICT), mathematics, music, PE, religion and philosophy, as well as science.

Most pupils in Key Stage 4 (ages 14–16) are entered into a mandatory set of GCSE qualifications in Year Nine, with final examinations sat in Year Eleven. Alongside the required PE and personal, health, social and citizenship education (PSHE); these consist of English language, English literature, mathematics and combined science (a subject comprising any two of biology, chemistry or physics). In addition, pupils choose four other course options, including at least one humanity (geography or history) and, preferably to the school, a foreign language (French or German). Triple science, leading to separate qualifications in all three disciplines, is available to those proficient in the subject; other GCSE course options include: art, astronomy, business and finance, computer science, cookery, drama, graphics, media studies, music, photography, religious studies, resistant materials, sports science and textiles. Furthermore, pupils are invited to participate in The Duke of Edinburgh's Award scheme as part of their PE studies in Year Ten.

=== Sixth Form ===
Depending on both standard and subject-specific GCSE, or equivalent, entry requirements, as well as an interview in the autumn term, students are initially enrolled on up to four courses, be they A Levels, vocational qualifications, or a combination. As of 2018, the 32 courses on offer comprised: applied science, biology, business studies, chemistry, computer science, drama and theatre studies, economics, English language, English literature, financial studies, fine art, forensic science, French, geography, German, government and politics, graphics and resistant materials, history, law, mathematics, core mathematics, further mathematics, media studies, photography, physics, psychology, religious studies, sport science, textiles and travel and tourism. As is considered mandatory, Year Twelve students organise a week of work experience toward the end of their academic year.

=== Examination ===
In 2017, 78% of pupils achieved five or more GCSEs, including in English language and mathematics, at level 4 (grade C equivalent) or higher. 28% of these results were recorded A or A*, or equivalent, with 27% of students achieving the English Baccalaureate, an indicator measuring attainment of traditionally academic qualifications. At A Level, 25% of results returned in 2017 were A or A*, with the average subject grade equating to a B−; in the same cohort, 85% of pupils passed three A Levels or more, 20% achieving them at grades AAB, including in at least two "facilitating subjects". With 40% of this contingent going up to Russell Group or Sutton Trust 30 universities, Carlton le Willows' results were ranked twelfth best in Nottinghamshire, complementing the lower school's eighth place for overall performance. In 2001, the school's average A Level performance saw it ranked by The Independent as the 54th best comprehensive in the United Kingdom; more recently, 2017 GCSE results were recognised by the Schools, Students and Teachers Network (SSAT) as belonging within the top 20% for British non-selective schools by Progress 8 benchmark attainment.

== Extra-curricular activities ==
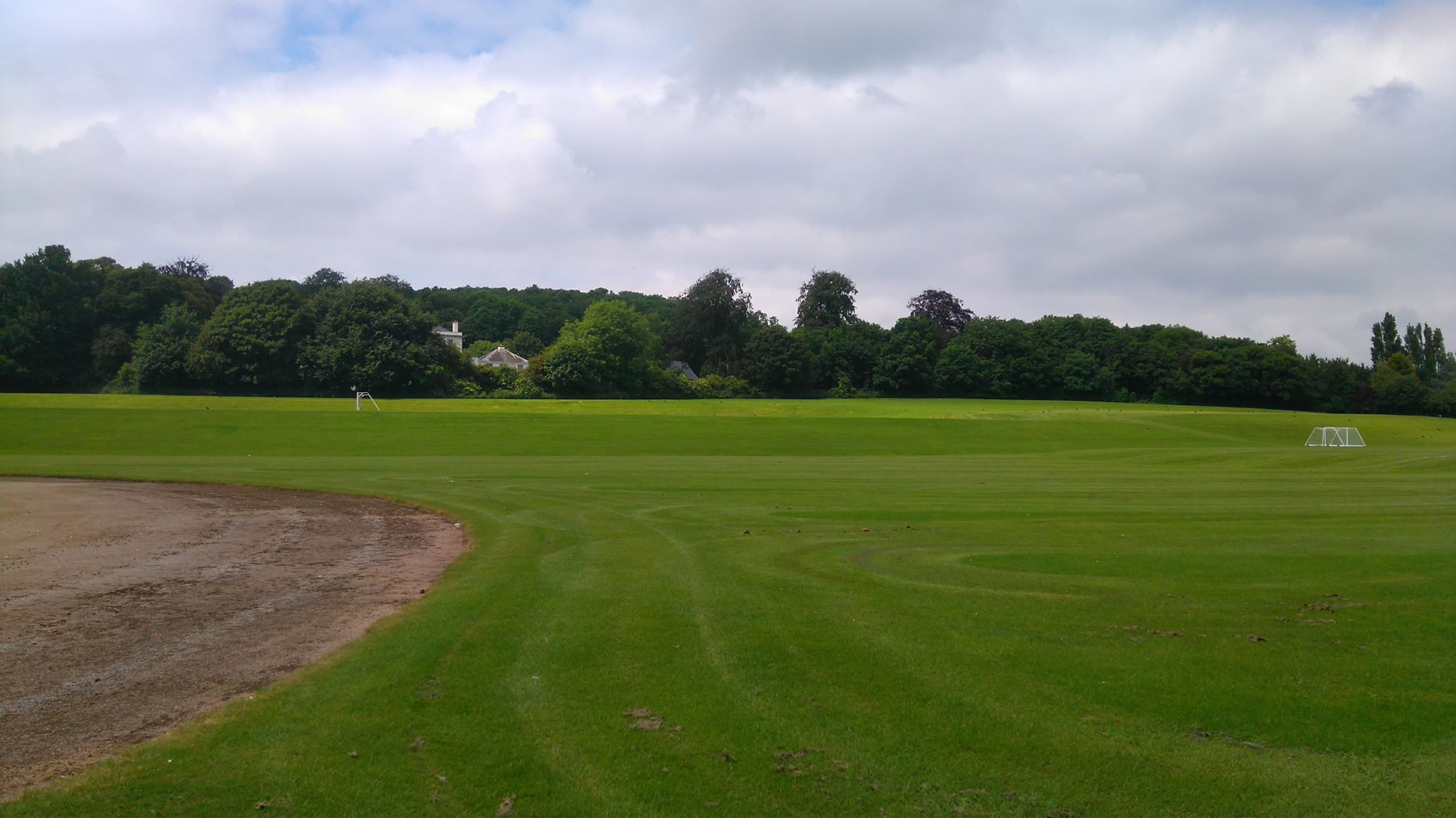
Section of the school's playing fields and track, with Gedling House in the background

As of 2018, the school offers many extra-curricular undertakings. Carlton le Willows sports a choir, string ensemble, book and drama clubs, samba sessions, band lessons and chess tutorials; seasonal festivals are also celebrated, namely Diwali, Saint Andrew's Day and during the Christmas season. Catch-up classes are available for pupils in art, biology, construction, drama, general science, German, history, mathematics, music, photography, physics and textiles, with library access made available on a weekly basis for private study. Pupil achievements and general updates are documented in the school's current termly publication, Le Willows Life.

=== Sport ===
Rugby at the grammar school benefited in its early years from the tutelage of David W. Roberts, who would later coach at Nottingham R.F.C. and the Canadian national team. The school's reputation for the sport was further compounded in 2008 as Carlton le Willows' Rugby Football Union-recognised first XV qualified for the opening round of the Daily Mail Under-18 Schools Cup. Furthermore, aside from historic prowess in long-distance running, Carlton le Willows has established itself in both the Nottinghamshire Schools' and English Schools' football associations, reaching the second round of the Premier League Under-16 Schools' Cup in 2017.

Presently, sporting activities at the school include training for basketball, association football, rugby, netball, table tennis and cross country running. Facilities for said pursuits include eight pitches, with markings for numerous field sports; the school also boasts a 400m cinder track with six lanes, three multi-purpose sports halls and a single playing field for cricket, complete with nets.

== Notable former pupils ==
The school and its forerunner institutions have educated notable figures in a wide range of fields. Writers and academics include science-fiction author John Peel (b. 1954), Knight Frank & Rutley Partner and novelist Allan Shelley (1931–2012), as well as urologist Bev Abel (1943–2018), a pioneer in surgical kidney treatments. Former pupils in the music industry include Graham Russell (b. 1950) of soft rock duo Air Supply, and singer-songwriter Sam Beeton (b. 1988). In sport, the school has produced first-class cricketer Mark Footitt (b. 1985), in addition to record-holding balloonist Janet Folkes (1959–2012). Carlton le Willows is represented in public affairs by Wilfrid Eggleston (1901–1986), Chief Censor for Canada during World War II, British Army officer and engineer Stephen Tetlow (b. 1954), as well as Brexit Party Member of the European Parliament (MEP) for the West Midlands, Martin Daubney (b. 1970). Alan Oakley (1927–2012), designer of the culturally iconic Raleigh Chopper bicycle, is also a former pupil.
