= Samuel Milne =

19th-century English businessman (1828–1877)

Samuel Milne FRSA (c. 1828 – 21 March 1877) was a 19th century English businessman in the cotton and woolen trade. Originally from Oldham in Lancashire, Milne became a major figure in the town's cotton-spinning industry through his highly successful partnership with Bagley & Wright from 1863 until his death in 1877. Prior to this, he oversaw huge growth in the Glodwick area, which has since become synonymous with one of Oldham's more significant contributions to the Industrial Revolution of the mid-Victorian period.

Living in Nottinghamshire during his years of financial success, Milne became involved in the dissenting movement by joining the newly established Congregationalist Church's circles. It is here that he liaised with the political radical Samuel Morley, MP for Nottingham between 1885 until 1886, who would later unveil his headstone at the Methodist Church in Burton Joyce after his death in 1877. The village's Congregationalist chapel was subsequently completed in 1896 using funds bequeathed by Milne in his will.

== Early life ==
Samuel Milne was born the fourth of seven children in Oldham to Abraham and Betty Milne. The 1841 English census places his date of birth sometime between 1827 and 1828 at aged 13, by which point he was living within the ancient ecclesiastical parish of Prestwich-cum-Oldham. (Note: His headstone in Burton Joyce claims he 'ENTERED INTO REST, MARCH 21ST 1877, IN THE 50TH YEAR OF HIS AGE', implying that he may have been born more specifically in 1827.) Milne had moved to Nottinghamshire sometime between 1852 and 1854 after the birth of his first son Joseph Newsom Milne (1852–1919) in Manchester. Prior to this, he had married Lydia Matilda Hodgson of Halifax, West Yorkshire, the daughter of working-class parents; her father, Samuel Hodgson, was from her hometown and her mother, Lydia Newsome, was born in Leeds.

== Trade successes ==
Milne had established his own cotton spinning company in Glodwick by the time he had moved to Nottinghamshire in the early 1850s. Like many textile companies recovering from Lancashire Cotton Famine, business growth was exponential, and Milne's establishment was noted for its success in the area, both succeeding in becoming hugely productive through the use of line shaft technology and managing to employ a great contingent of the local population to complete more tasks after many of the previous workers has emigrated from Britain to find work. Such success had allowed Milne to live in moderately affluent circumstances in Burton Joyce, residing in a country house in a rural area of the village known as 'The Grove'.

In 1863, textile workers Ralph Bagley and Benjamin Wright approached Samuel Milne with the proposition to form a business to dominate Oldham's textile production. Milne agreed, and the company (aptly named Bagley, Wright & Milne) began production at a shed in Roscoe Street in 1867. Wright's younger brother, Joseph, also joined the business in a managerial position shortly after its foundation. Bagley and Wright also established a partnership with cotton spinner John Marsden, who owned his own company based at a 'Crabtree Mill'. Bagley, Wright, Milne and Marsden were all followers of the Wesleyanism branch of Methodism at this time, as its ideology encouraged enterprise, a trait viewed favorably to the middle classes of the period.
