= John Cartledge =

English cricketer

Personal information
- Born: 16 May 1855; Burton Joyce, Nottinghamshire, England
- Died: 8 July 1907 (aged 52); Stoke Bardolph, Nottinghamshire, England
- Batting: Right-handed

Domestic team information
- Years: Team
- 1878: Derbyshire
- Only FC: 1 July 1878 Derbyshire v All England Eleven

Career statistics
Competition	First-class
Matches	1
Runs scored	1
Batting average	0.50
100s/50s	0/0
Top score	1
Catches/stumpings	0/–
- Source: CricketArchive, 25 January 2011

John Cartledge (16 May 1855 – 8 July 1907), born John Cartledge Foster, was an English cricketer who played for Derbyshire in 1878.

Cartledge was born in Burton Joyce, Nottinghamshire. He took part in a Derbyshire vs. All England Eleven fixture in the 1878 season Nine of the players in the All England Eleven were past, present, or future Test cricketers, and Derbyshire lost by seven wickets. Cartledge played as a lower-middle order batsman and was dismissed by Alfred Shaw for 1 and Dick Barlow for 0. Cartledge played a game for Nottinghamshire Colts in 1879.

Cartledge died in Stoke Bardolph, Nottinghamshire at the age of 52.
