= Burton Joyce railway station =

Railway station in Nottinghamshire, England

Coordinates: 52°58′59″N 1°02′30″W

Burton Joyce
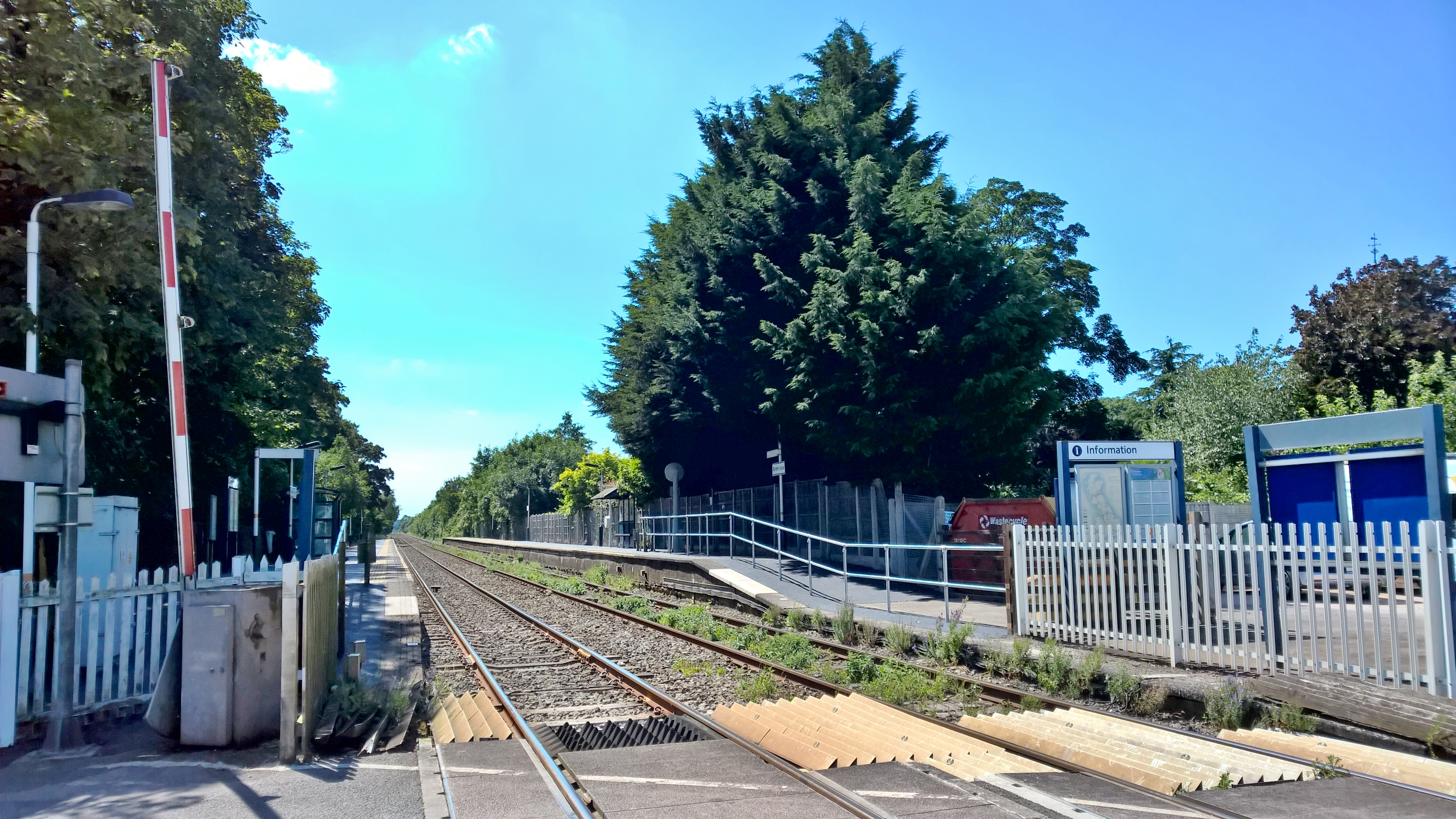

General information
- Location: Burton Joyce, Borough of Gedling, England
- Grid reference: SK644433
- Manager: East Midlands Railway
- Platforms: 2

Other information
- Station code: BUJ
- Classification: DfT category F2

Passengers
- 2021/22: ▲6,146
- 2022/23: ▲9,426
- 2023/24: ▲11,014
- 2024/25: ▲13,392
- 2025/26: ▲19,236
Location
Notes
- Passenger statistics from the Office of Rail and Road

Burton Joyce railway station serves the large village of Burton Joyce, in Nottinghamshire, England. It lies between Carlton and Lowdham stations on the Nottingham to Lincoln Line.

== History ==
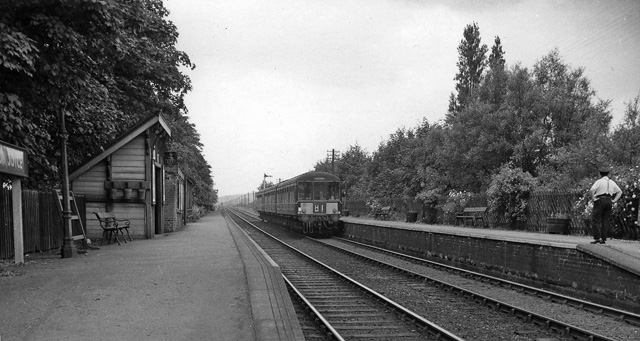
The station in 1963

During the railway's construction, the builders of the railway faced a good deal of opposition at Burton Joyce, which resulted in the station being located outside of the village. The railway company's preferred site was near the Lord Nelson inn, but the innkeeper objected on claiming that he would be forced to brew more beer. Additionally, the vicar of St Helen's Church, Revd. John Rolleston, near whose vicarage the line was to run, objected to the railway on account of the noise. Finally, the promoters of the railway bought him out and built a new vicarage for him.

The line was engineered by George Stephenson and was opened by the Midland Railway on 3 August 1846. The contractors for the line were Craven and Son of Newark and Nottingham.

The westbound platform was shortened significantly when locomotive-hauled trains were replaced in the 1960s.

=== Stationmasters ===
- Joseph Peel ca. 1859-1877
- Charles Jobbins 1877-1879 (later station master at Coaley Junction)
- William Allen 1879-1884
- W. Whatley 1884-1886
- William Henry Payne 1886-1892 (formerly station master at Tonge and Breedon)
- F. Porter 1892-1895 (later station master at East Langton)
- Frederick Mason 1895-1899 (later station master at Mansfield Woodhouse)
- Sidney W. Varnam 1899-1903 (later station master at Old Dalby)
- E.H. Allen 1903-1906
- H.D.D. Hinton 1906-1908
- George Calow 1908-ca.1911 (formerly station master at Watnall)
- G. Dewey ca. 1914
- A.R. Powell from 1938

== Facilities ==
The station is managed by East Midlands Railway. It has two platforms, a five-space car park, a help point and shelters on both platforms.

== Services ==
East Midlands Railway operates the route between Lincoln and Crewe, via Nottingham. Services call at the station every hour in each direction.

On Sundays, trains stop every two hours each way, but these run between Lincoln and Matlock.

Preceding station	National Rail	Following station
Carlton	East Midlands Railway Nottingham–Lincoln line	Lowdham
