= Tetlow =

- Pronunciation: /ˈtɛtloʊ/
- Language: English

Origin
- Language: English
- Derivation: "Taeta" (personal name) + "hlaw" (hill) / "leah" (wood)
- Meaning: "Taete's hill" or "Taete's wood"

Other names
- Variant forms: Tetlaw; Tetley

Tetlow is an English topographic surname deriving from the Anglo-Saxon personal name Taeta and hlaw (hill) or leah (wood) meaning 'Taete's hill' or 'Taete's wood'. The surname originated from the estate named Tetlow in Broughton and Cheetham, near Manchester, Lancashire, England, which was owned by the Tetlow family in the fourteenth century. A branch of this family later lived in Oldham: The Tetlows of Chamber Hall, Oldham, were an ancient gentry family who lived at Chamber Hall from at least the 1320s until 1646.

People with this surname include:

- Jim Tetlow (William James Tetlow, born 1955), American theater consultant and television and theatrical lighting designer
- Josh Tetlow (born 1998), English hockey player
- Stephen Tetlow (born 1954), engineer and former senior British Army officer
- Tania Tetlow, American lawyer, professor, and president of Loyola University New Orleans.
- Raymond Tetlow, Tech Entrepreneur, Founder of SuiteRetail
