= United Reformed Church, Burton Joyce =

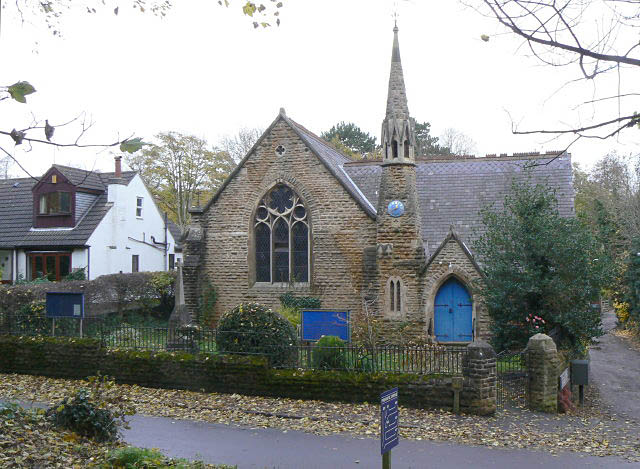
- A frontal view of the church

- Location within Nottinghamshire
- 52°59′19.81″N 1°02′28.34″W
- Location: Burton Joyce, Nottinghamshire
- Country: England
- Denomination: United Reformed Church

History
- Former name(s): Congregationalist Church, Burton Joyce
- Founded: 1896
- Founder: Samuel Milne FRSA

Architecture
- Completed: 1896
- Closed: 2015

The United Reformed Church (formerly known as the village's Congregationalist Church) is a now redundant Christian church that operated under the United Reformed denomination in the small Nottinghamshire village of Burton Joyce. It was founded by a generous endowment made by local yarn and cotton tradesman Samuel Milne in 1896, and closed as a formal place of worship in 2015.

== History ==
The church was founded as a Congregationalist Chapel in 1896 using money endowed by successful local tradesman Samuel Milne. He had initially made his fortune from the wool and cotton industry, using both the villages of Bulcote and Burton Joyce's vast acreage of arable lands to graze sheep and grow cotton crop. His success was eventually recognized on being granted membership of the Royal Society of Arts in 1873; where he is noted to have attended meetings with Admiral Lord Clarence Paget, who accepted his membership personally.
