= Lowdham railway station =

Grade II listed railway station in Nottinghamshire, England

Coordinates: 53°00′24″N 0°59′53″W

Lowdham
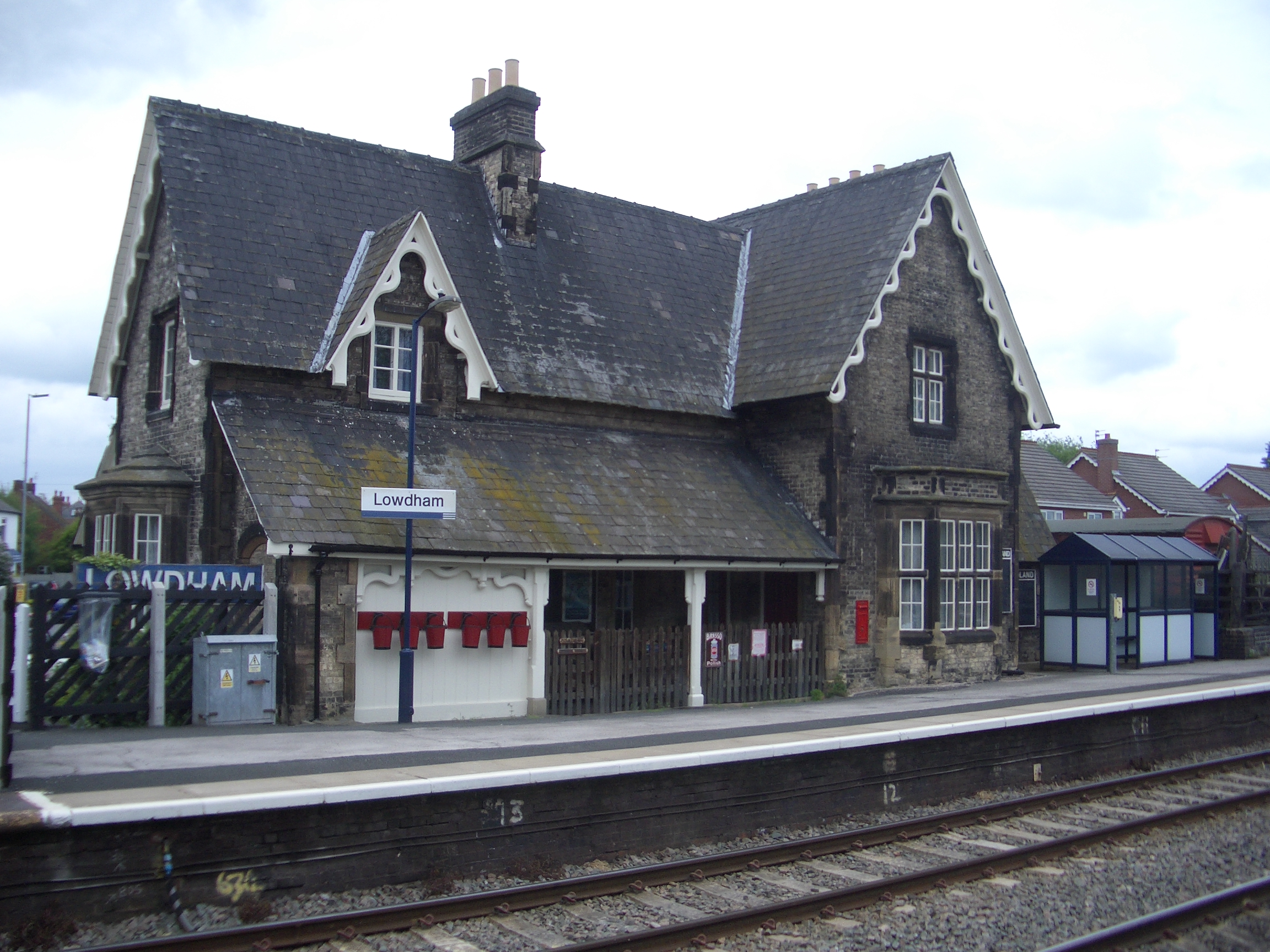

General information
- Location: Lowdham, Newark and Sherwood, England
- Grid reference: SK673459
- Managed by: East Midlands Railway
- Platforms: 2

Other information
- Station code: LOW
- Classification: DfT category F2

Passengers
- 2020/21: ▼9,216
- 2021/22: ▲30,880
- 2022/23: ▲39,988
- 2023/24: ▲44,130
- 2024/25: ▲55,184

Listed Building – Grade II
- Feature: Lowdham railway station, Station Road
- Designated: 13 May 1986
- Reference no.: 1370192
Location
Notes
- Passenger statistics from the Office of Rail and Road

Lowdham railway station is a Grade II listed railway station, which serves the village of Lowdham, in Nottinghamshire, England.

== History ==
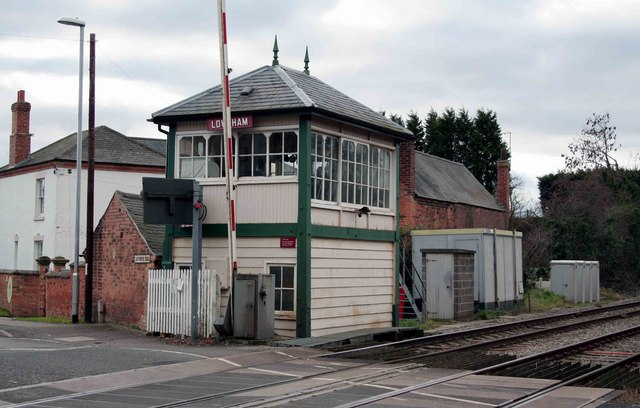
Signal box (2008)

It is a stop on the Nottingham to Lincoln Line, which was engineered by George Stephenson and opened by the Midland Railway on 3 August 1846. The contractors for the line were Craven and Son of Newark and Nottingham; the buildings were probably designed by Thomas Chambers Hine.

The buildings originally comprised a combined station building and station master's house, a weighbridge hut at the entrance to the goods yard, a goods shed and stables for the horses that drew the drays to deliver goods. A waiting room, a porter's room and a lamp hut were on the opposite platform from the station building, with a signal box across the road on that side, next to the level crossing. The signal box was opened on 14 June 1896. This Midland Railway Type 2b box was the oldest on the line when abolished in 2016.

In 1953, the station made national headlines when a train stopped blocking the level crossing for 45 minutes as the engine driver, Fred Jones, and his fireman, David Mews, had "a few words". The driver stopped because he thought there was not enough water in his boiler and he blew the fire out; the fireman thought there was enough pressure in the boiler for them to continue. The driver requested water for the engine and a relief fireman. Many of the passengers alighted from the train and shouted angrily whilst the driver and fireman held a discussion. British Railways supplied a relief fireman and a relief driver to resolve the situation.

The station was Grade II listed on 13 May 1986.

The main station building is now in private ownership; it has been renovated and used to exhibit items on the history of the Midland Railway. In 2016, the line was resignalled by Network Rail, making the signal boxes at Lowdham redundant. The signal box closed on 1 October 2016 when control transferred to the East Midlands Integrated Electronic Control Centre at Derby

In 2017, the Nottingham-bound platform was extended to compensate for the reduction in usable platform caused by the positioning of one of the new signals.

In October 2020, the 1896 signal box at the level crossing was removed overnight to be restored by charity Lowdham Railway Heritage as a museum.

=== Stationmasters ===
The station suffered difficulties with its early station masters. The Stamford Mercury of 10 May 1861 records that Leonard Moore committed suicide by hanging on 8 May 1861; it reported that he was the fifth station master at Lowdham who has either committed suicide or suffered imprisonment for embezzling the money of the Midland Railway Company.

- Evelyn Walters 1846-1850 (charged with embezzling money)
- George Reeves c. 1851 – 1857 (sentenced to six months’ hard labour for embezzling money)
- Leonard Moore c. 1859 – 1861 (committed suicide)
- J. Ashton c. 1861
- G. Hodgkinson c. 1862
- R. Peddle until 1863 (afterwards station master at Kibworth)
- Caleb Porter from 1863 (formerly station master at Kibworth)
- Henry Hall. c. 1868 – 1871
- Thomas Wormall until 1873
- W.G. Watkins 1874-1879
- Samuel Savage 1879-1885 (formerly station master at Castle Donington)
- G. Croft 1885-1888
- George Butler 1888-1907 (later station master at Blesby)
- George Ernest Aiers 1907–1911 (formerly station master at Bleasby)
- S. Eaton from 1911 (formerly station master at Radford)
- J. Fawkes c. 1914
- F. Hickman until 1937 (formerly station master at Rotten Park Road, Tile Hill)
- J.F. Georgeson from 1937 (formerly station master at Goostrey, also station master at Thurgarton)
- H. Simpson c. 1946 – c. 1950
- George Tubbs c. 1953

== Services ==
All services at Lowdham are operated by East Midlands Railway. The typical off-peak service in trains per hour is:

- 1 tph to Crewe, via Nottingham
- 1 tph to Lincoln.
- 2 tpd to London St Pancras; this service does not run on Sundays.

Some services run to Cleethorpes and Matlock in the early mornings and evenings.

On Sundays, there is an approximately hourly service between Matlock and Lincoln from mid-morning onwards.

Preceding station	National Rail	Following station
Burton Joyce	East Midlands Railway Nottingham-Lincoln Line	Thurgarton
Nottingham	East Midlands Railway Midland Main Line Limited Service	Newark Castle

== Gallery ==
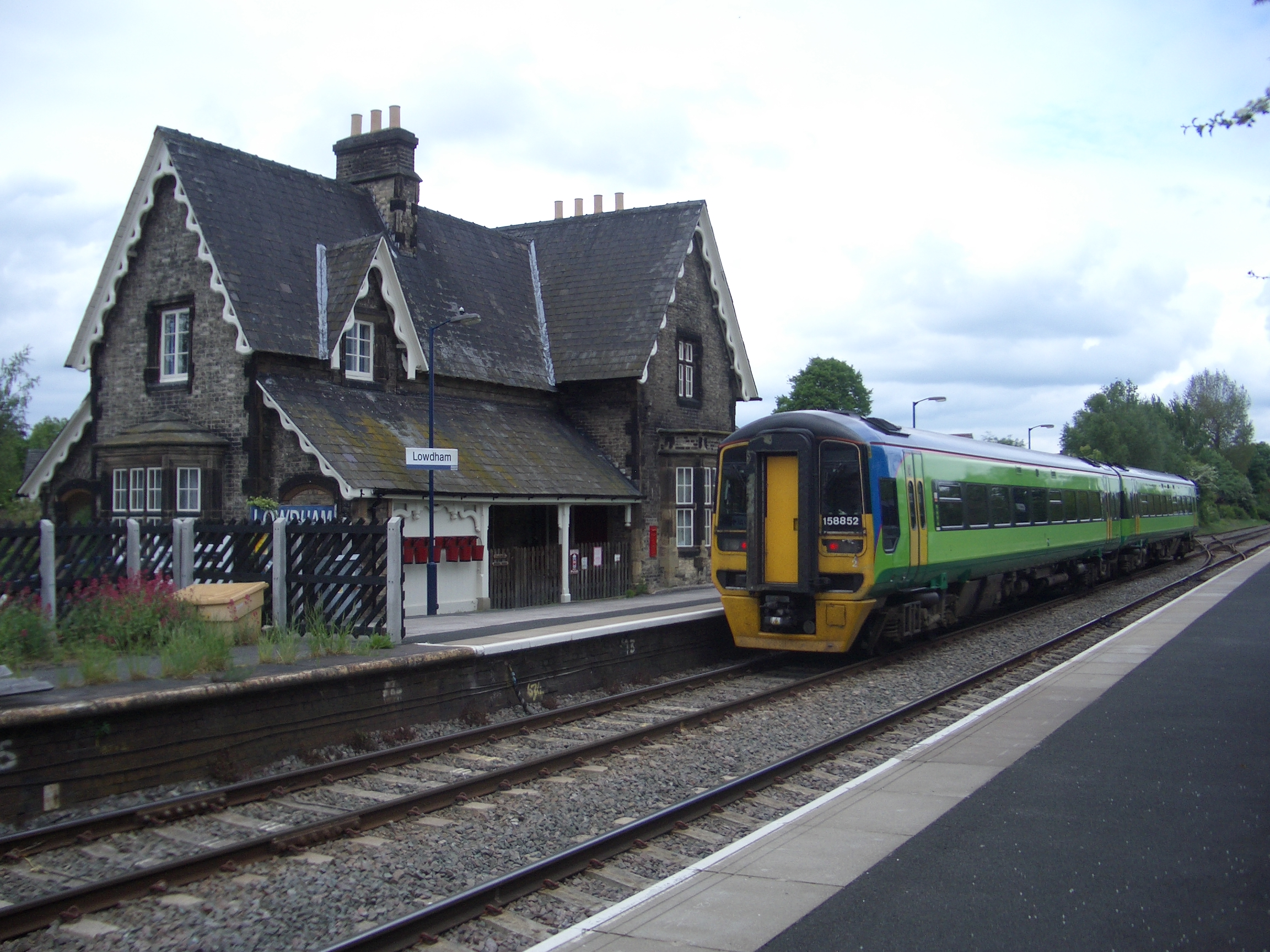

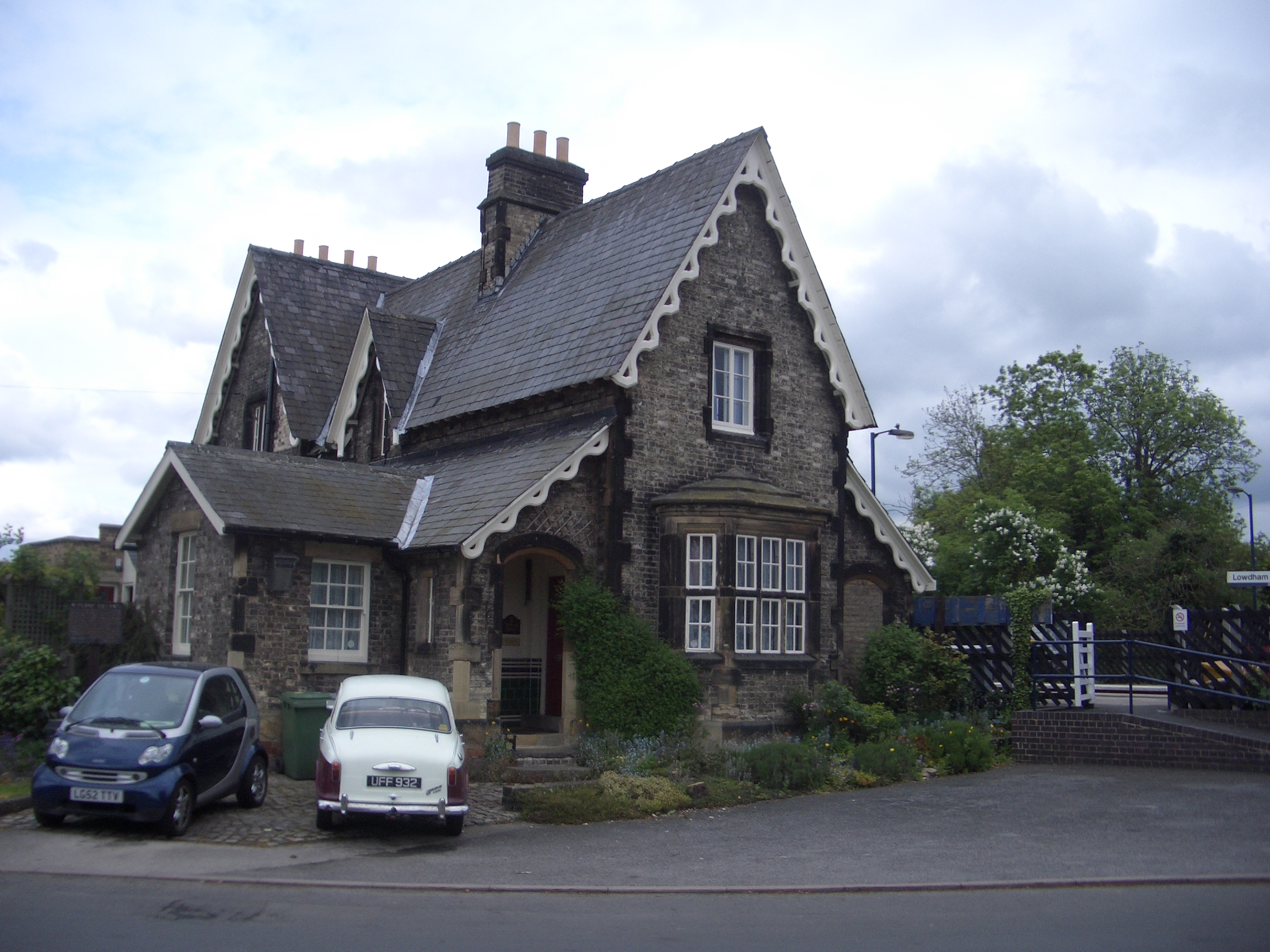

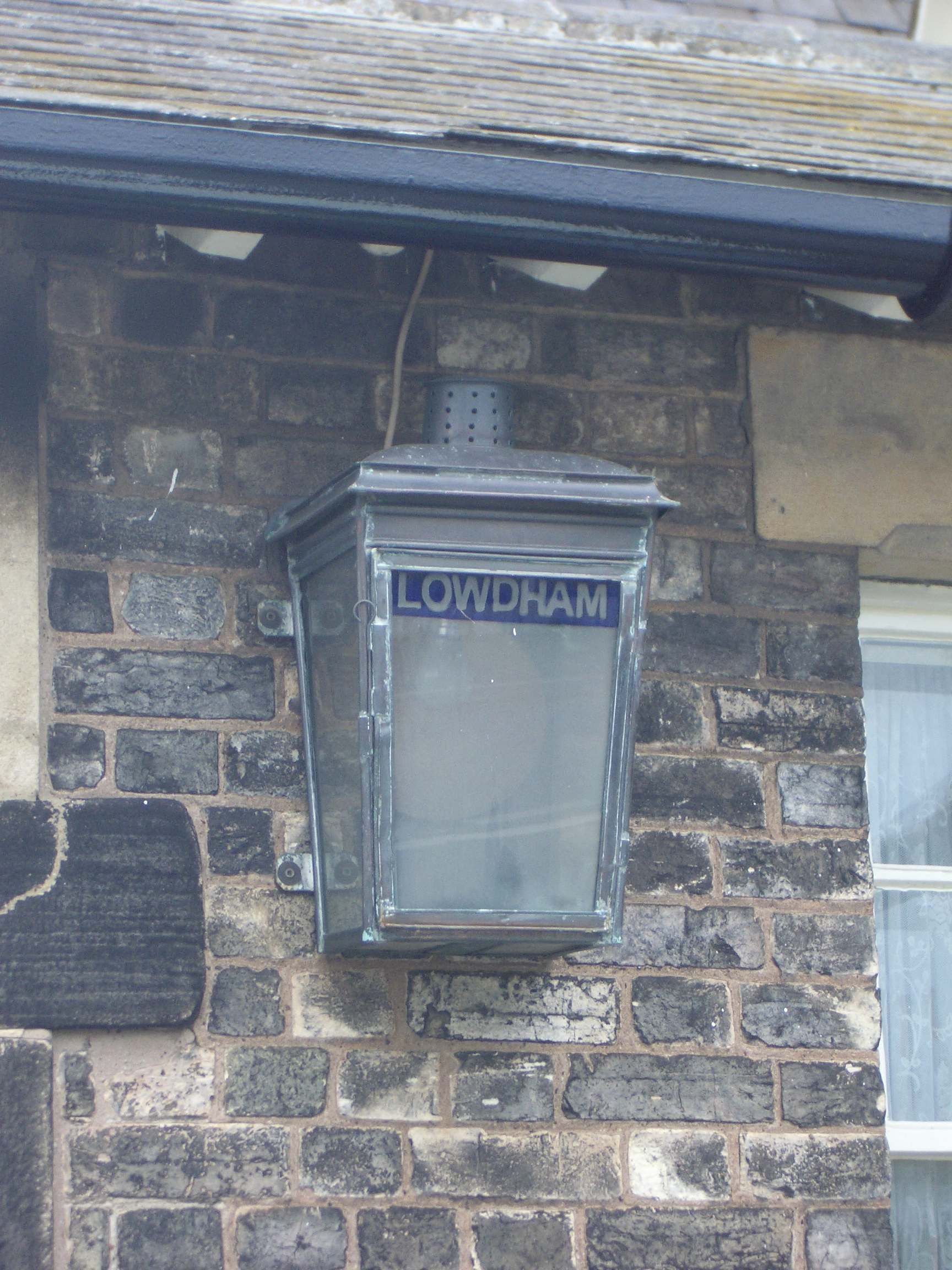

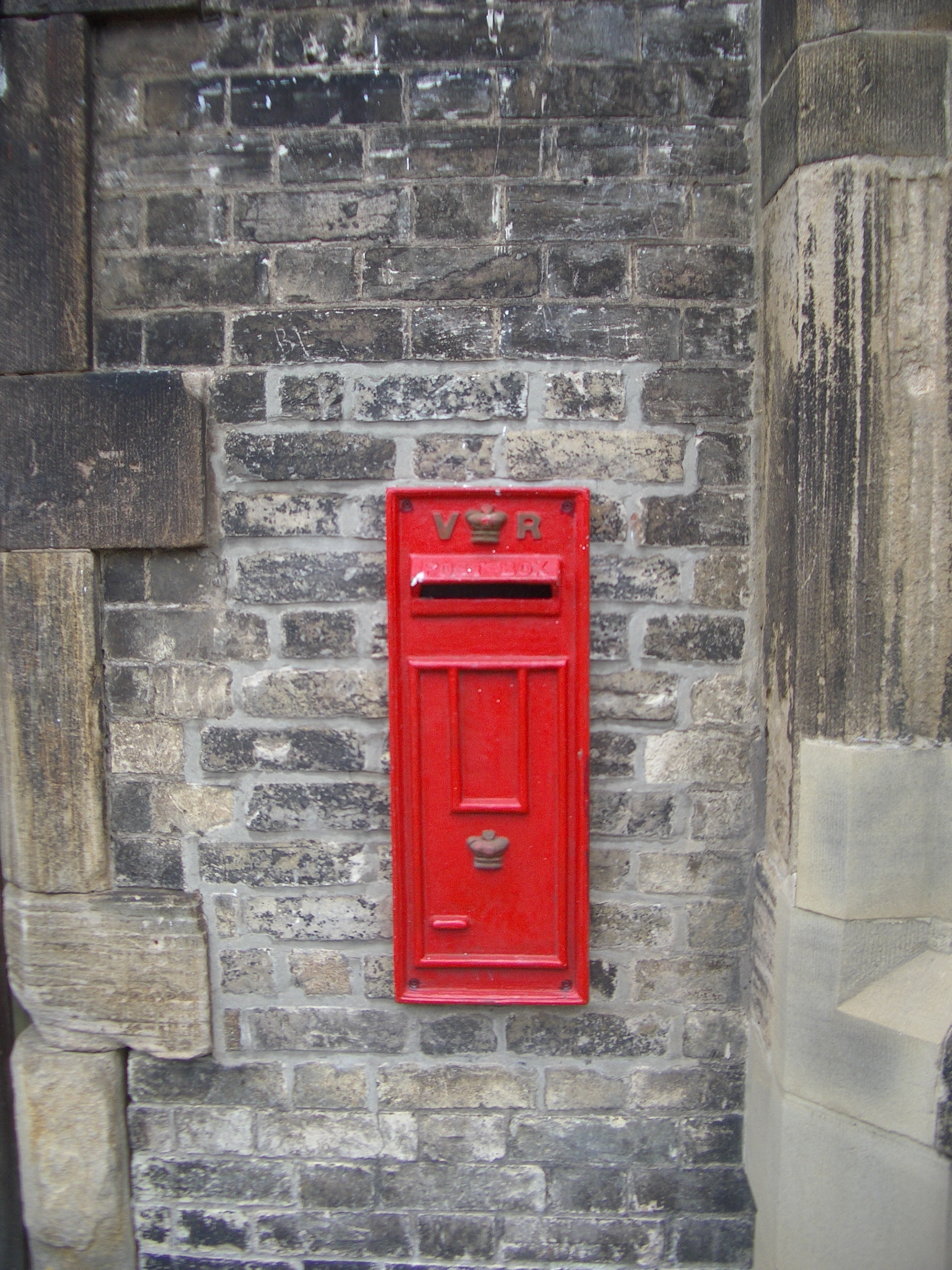
Victorian wall post box

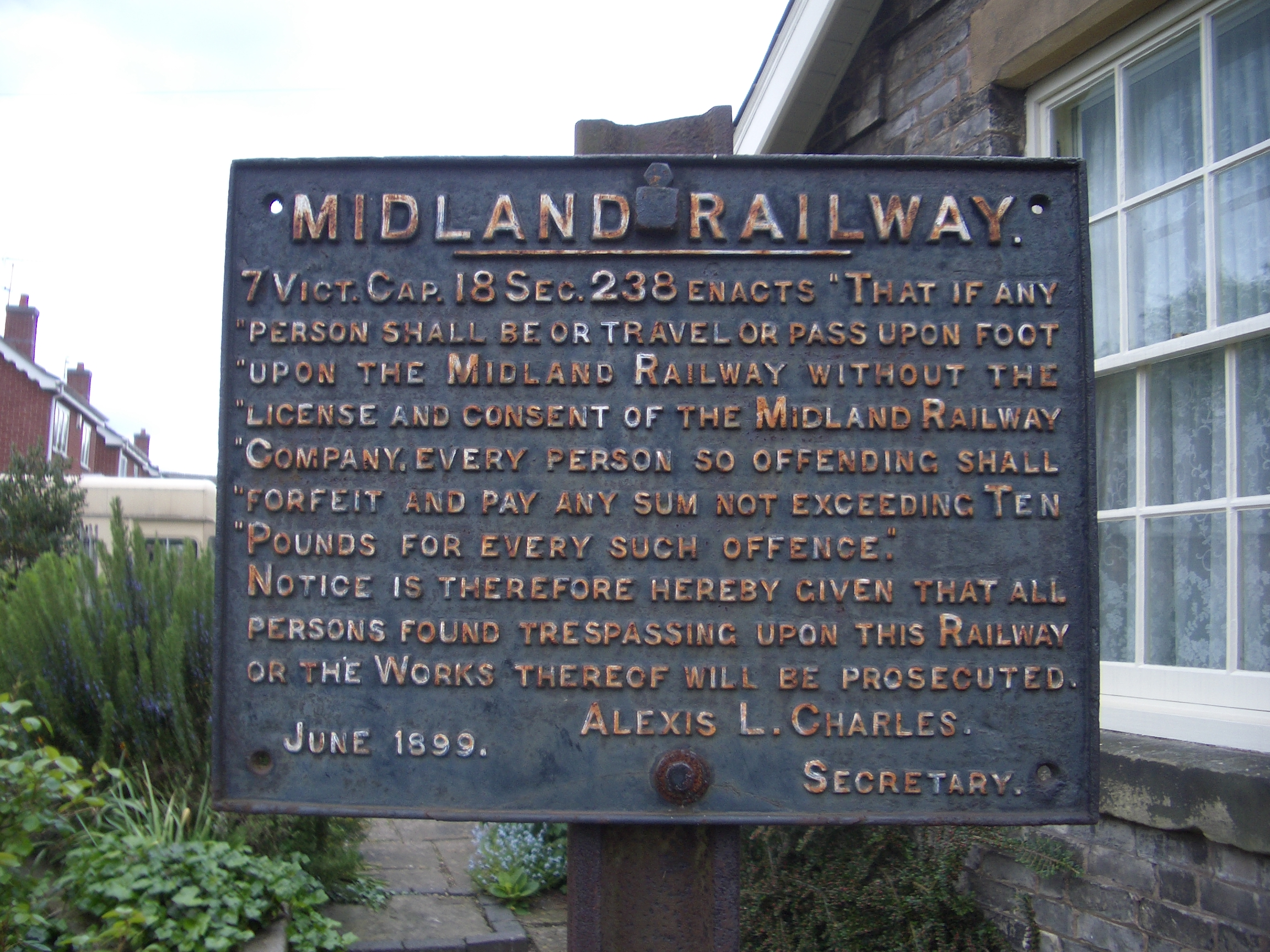
1899 "No Trespassing" sign

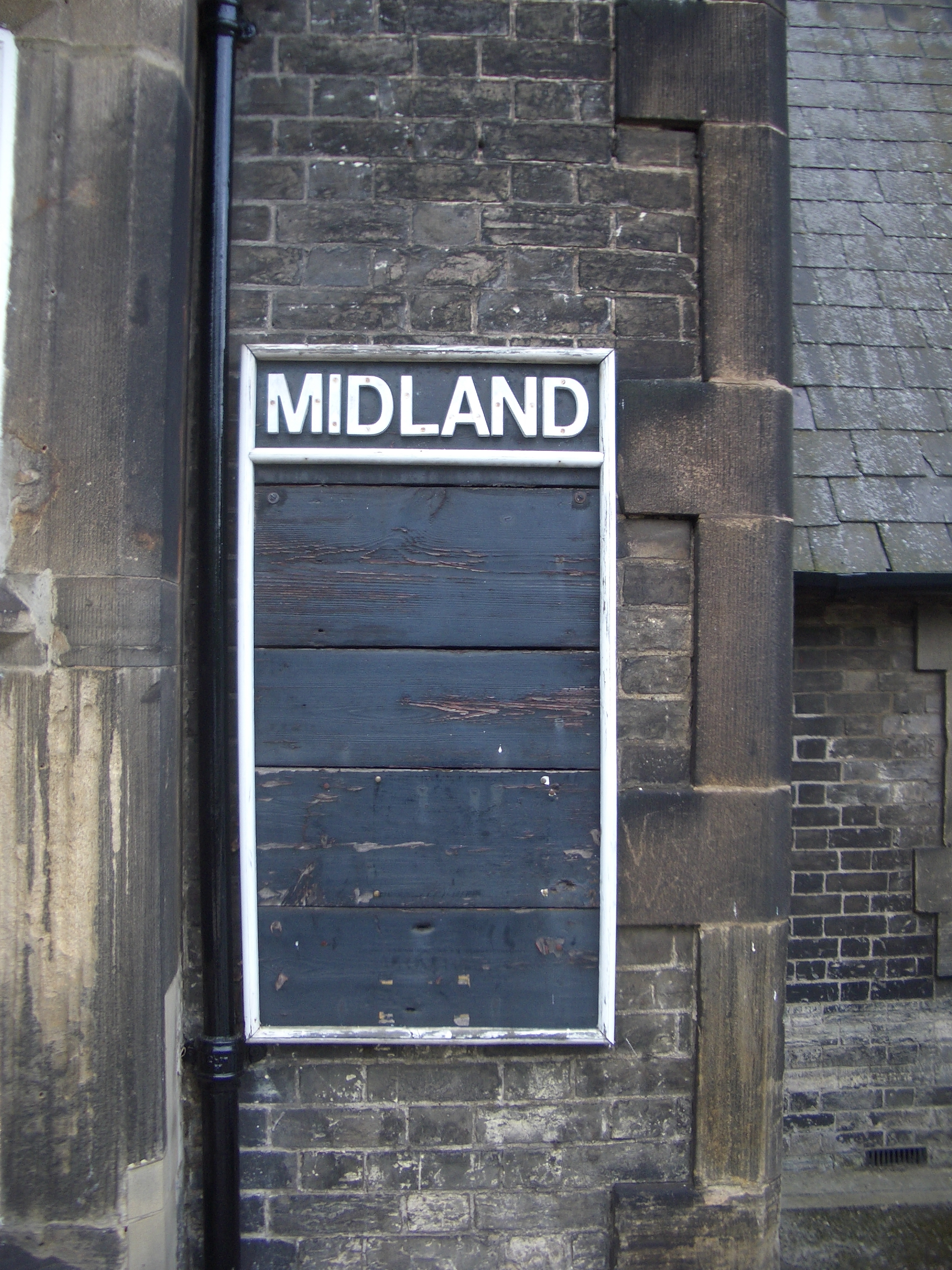
Midland Railway noticeboard

== See also ==
- Listed buildings in Lowdham
