= Listed buildings in Burton Joyce =

Civil parish

Burton Joyce is a civil parish in the Gedling district of Nottinghamshire, England. The parish contains eight listed buildings that are recorded in the National Heritage List for England. Of these, one is listed at Grade I, the highest of the three grades, and the others are at Grade II, the lowest grade. The parish contains the village of Burton Joyce and the surrounding area. The listed buildings consist of two churches, the separate top of a church spire, a house, a barn, a farmhouse and stables, a footbridge and a war memorial

== Key ==
Grade	Criteria
I	Buildings of exceptional interest, sometimes considered to be internationally important
II	Buildings of national importance and special interest

== Buildings ==
Name and location	Photograph	Date	Notes	Grade
St Helen's Church; 52.98671°N 1.03647°W		13th century	The church has been altered and extended through the centuries, the south aisle was added in about 1725, and there were internal changes in 1878. The church is built in stone with roofs of lead and tile, and it consists of a nave, north and south aisles, a south porch, a chancel, a vestry and a west steeple. The steeple has a plinth, a string course, corner buttresses, a west lancet window, and a broach spire with two tiers of gabled lucarnes, a finial and a weathercock.	I
Spire top, St Helen's Church; 52.98662°N 1.03658°W		14th century	The top of a former spire of the church, placed adjacent to the church. It is in stone, octagonal, and about 2 metres (6 ft 7 in) high. The spire top has a shaped terminal and an iron spike.	II
The Manor House; 52.98854°N 1.03461°W	—	Early 17th century	A farmhouse, later a private house, it has a timber framed core and is encased in brick, partly roughcast, on a plinth, with rebated eaves, and a roof of pantile and slate with a coped gable. There are two storeys and attics, and an L-shaped plan with a main range of four bays, a rear wing, and a wing to the south. The doorway at the front has a fanlight, to its right is a round-headed boot scraper, the windows are a mix of casements and sashes, and at the rear is a gabled porch.	II
Lodge Farmhouse and stables 52.99491°N 1.05716°W		c. 1675	The farmhouse is in rendered brick, with a floor band, and a slate roof with shouldered coped gables. There are two storeys, an L-shaped plan, with a main range of five bays, and a single-story lean-to. The doorway has a fanlight, and most of the windows are sashes. The stable range at right angles to the rear has a tile roof, two storeys, and a lean-to cowshed. It contains casement windows and pitching holes.	II
Barn, 36 Lambley Lane; 52.98866°N 1.04107°W		Late 17th century	The barn has a timber framed core, it was encased in brick in 1751, and extended in the early 19th century. There is a pantile roof, three unequal bays, and a lean-to pigsty. The barn contains casement windows, doorways, and vents in various patterns.	II
Footbridge; 52.98522°N 1.03613°W		Late 18th century	The footbridge carries the towpath of the River Trent over the Crock Dumble stream. It consists of a single stone lintel forming a rectangular opening. The bridge has a chamfered plinth course, and a low dressed stone parapet with rounded coping.	II
Methodist Church, schoolroom and wall 52.98863°N 1.03495°W		1908	The church and schoolroom are in brick with stone dressings and slate roofs. The church consists of a nave and a chancel under a continuous roof, north and south aisles, a north porch, north and south transepts, and a southwest tower. The tower has two stages, diagonal buttresses, a west doorway with a moulded surround and a coped gable with a niche, a moulded string course, an embattled parapet, and a recessed octagonal spire. To the east is a schoolroom with five bays and casement windows. The area around the buildings is enclosed by a dwarf brick wall with chamfered coping and iron railings. It contains five wrought iron gates, one pair between gate piers with moulded capitals.	II
War memorial 52.98660°N 1.03942°W		c. 1920	The war memorial is in a garden by a road junction, and is in limestone, and in Baroque style. It consists of a square plinth of two steps, on which is a moulded square base, and a square column with a deep plinth and a corniced capital, surmounted by a small cross. On the base are inscribed panels.	II
