= Listed buildings in Bulcote =

Bulcote is a civil parish in the Newark and Sherwood district of Nottinghamshire, England. The parish contains 16 listed buildings that are recorded in the National Heritage List for England. All the listed buildings are designated at Grade II, the lowest of the three grades, which is applied to "buildings of national importance and special interest". The parish contains the village of Bulcote and the surrounding area. Most of the listed buildings are houses, cottages and associated structures, and the others are a church, and a model farm and houses for its workers.

== Buildings ==
Name and location	Photograph	Date	Notes
Walnut House; 52.99446°N 1.02054°W	—	Mid 17th century	The house was extended in the 18th century. It is in rendered red brick on a plinth, and has a slate roof. There are two storeys and four bays, and at the rear is a wing with a single-storey and an attic and two bays in painted brick with a tile roof. On the front are two doorways, one with a fanlight, and the windows are sashes in moulded frames.
Bulcote Lodge; 52.99547°N 1.02247°W		Late 17th century	A house that has been extended, in rendered red brick, with a floor band, overhanging eaves on brackets, and a tile roof with coped gables and kneelers. There are two storeys and an attic, and four bays, and at the rear are projecting wings and a lean-to. The porch has a pointed entrance, and the doorway has a pointed arch. The windows also have pointed arches and Gothick glazing, and in the attic is a dormer.
The Manor House; 52.99546°N 1.02034°W		c. 1700	The house is in red brick with floor bands, and a tile roof with brick coped gables and kneelers. There are three storeys and three bays, and a recessed single-storey two-bay extension to the left. The front facing the road has two gables, it contains a central porch with a coped gable and kneelers, and the windows are casements.
Ivy House; 52.99619°N 1.02128°W		Early 18th century	The house is in red brick with some blue brick, dogtooth eaves, and a pantile roof with blue brick coped gables and kneelers. There are two storeys and attics, and four bays. The doorway and the windows, which are casements, have segmental heads, and in the roof are two gabled dormers.
King's Barn; 52.99442°N 1.01990°W		Early 18th century	Two cottages combined into one house, it is in red brick with some blue brick, floor bands, and a pantile roof with blue brick coped gables and kneelers. There are two storeys and attics, and six bays, and a lean-to on the right. Most of the windows are casements, some tripartite and some with a single light, most with segmental heads, and there is a horizontally-sliding sash window.
Stable block, Walnut House; 52.99464°N 1.02021°W		Early 18th century	The stable block is in painted red brick with a pantile roof, a single storey and nine bays. The openings include stable doors, and semicircular openings, some blocked.
Ivy Cottages; 52.99609°N 1.02114°W		Mid 18th century	A pair of cottages in red brick with a floor band and a pantile roof. There are two storeys and six bays. On the front are two doorways, and the windows are casements, those in the ground floor tripartite with segmental heads, and in the upper floor with two lights.
Oaklands; 52.99412°N 1.02166°W	—	Late 18th century	The house is in rendered brick with a pantile roof. There are two storeys and attics and two bays, and the windows are sashes. At the rear is an earlier wing with two storeys and two bays, and a trellis porch with a slate roof and a doorway with pointed arched panels.
Bulcote Crossing Cottage; 52.99363°N 1.01946°W		Mid-1840s (probable)	The cottage by the railway level crossing is in grey brick with some stone, on a chamfered stone plinth, with floor bands, a raised eaves band, and a pyramidal slate roof. There are two storeys and three bays, and a recessed single-bay extension on the right. In the centre is a gabled porch with overhanging eaves on brackets, and a round-arched entrance. The windows are casements, in the ground floor with round-arched heads, and in the upper floor with brick wedge lintels.
Holy Trinity Church; 52.99644°N 1.02315°W		1862	The church, designed by Thomas Bower, is built in stone with red brick stripes, and a slate roof with decorative ridges and coped gables. It consists of a nave, a south porch, a north vestry and organ chamber, and a chancel with a round apse. On the west gable is a bellcote with two trefoil arches on three foliate-decorated corbels, over which is a trefoil. At the outer angles are columns with foliate capitals, and in the gable apex is a circular panel with a carved figure.
Kingswood and pump 52.99411°N 1.02705°W	—	1893	A house designed by Watson Fothergill in red brick on a plinth, with dressings in stone and blue brick, floor bands, sprocketed eaves and a tile roof. There are two storeys and four bays, recessed to the left is a wing with three storeys and an attic and two bays, beyond which is a gabled two-storey three-bay wing. On the main block is a two-storey porch with the doorway in the right side that has a quoined surround, and a depressed ogee arch with an orb finial, and in the spandrels are initials and the date. The upper floor of the porch is polygonal and has a conical roof with a decorative finial. Most of the windows are sashes with wedge lintels, some with a keystone. Adjacent to the north wall is a wood, lead and iron water pump with a stone trough.
Coach House, Kingswood; 52.99415°N 1.02734°W		1893	The coach house, designed by Watson Fothergill, is in red and blue brick, the upper floor timber framed with brick nogging, with a sill band, sprocketed eaves, and a tile roof, hipped to the right. There is a single storey and a loft, and three bays. Projecting on the left is a bay with two storeys and an attic, and a pyramidal roof with a weathervane. The doorway has a segmental head, and the windows are casement windows.
Gateway, Kingswood; 52.99369°N 1.02710°W		1893	The gateway was designed by Watson Fothergill, and has decorative iron double gates flanked by stone piers with chamfered corners and holders for lamps. At the top is pyramidal-shaped coping with a chevron and a trefoil. The gateway is flanked by decorative railings ending in fluted iron piers.
1-12 Corporation Cottages; 52.99313°N 1.01900°W		1902	Six semi-detached farmworkers' houses, designed by Arthur Brown, in red brick with timber framed gables and tile roofs. They have two storeys and two bays, and each pair is a mirror-image. They all have gabled porches and casement windows, and Nos. 11–12 are larger, the middle part projecting, and with gabled porches in the centre. At the rear of each house is a single-storey wing.
Bulcote Farm; 52.99193°N 1.01750°W		1902	A model farm designed by Arthur Brown, with the farm buildings around a quadrangle. The buildings are in red brick with blue brick and sill bands, stone dressings and tile roofs. The windows have iron frames, central opening casements, and segmental heads. The northwest and northeast ranges have two storeys, and to the south is an office building with a single storey, sash windows and an octagonal bay window. By the office is an entrance with ornate iron gates and iron gate piers, and a weighbridge. The southeast range has a two-storey stable range and a single--storey dairy range.
Field House; 52.99085°N 1.01642°W		1902	A farm manager's house designed by Arthur Brown, it is in red brick on a blue brick plinth with yellow brick bands, and a slate roof. There are two storeys and three bays. The central doorway has a fanlight, and the windows are casements.
