= Janet Folkes =

British engineer, academic and balloonist

Dr Janet Folkes (20 July 1959 – 17 January 2012) was an academic from Nottingham, who held multiple ballooning records. She died in 2012 from breast cancer.

== Career ==
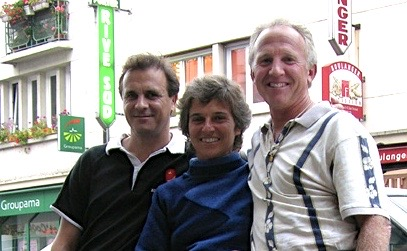
Folkes (centre) photographed in 2004

Folkes worked in the Faculty of Engineering at the University of Nottingham. She was an expert in lasers and water-jetting. She researched the use of lasers in cutting, welding and shaping metals – working closely with the engine maker Rolls-Royce.

== Ballooning ==
Folkes took up the sport of ballooning in 1984.

She competed in the Gordon Bennett Cup (for gas-filled balloons) in 1999, 2002, 2003, 2004, 2007, and 2009. During the 2009 race, she set the women's world endurance record with Dr Ann Rich, staying in the air for over 69 hours. She also piloted hot air balloons.

In 1995, she set the women's world altitude balloons record. In total, she established 46 world records.

She was involved as a technical engineer on the non-stop around the world attempt by Richard Branson, Per Lindstrand and Steve Fossett.

== Death and legacy ==
Folkes died in January 2012, leaving as a legacy the Nottingham University balloon, G-NUNI. Her funeral took place in Bulcote, Nottingham, where she had lived since childhood.
