= Holy Trinity Church, Bulcote =

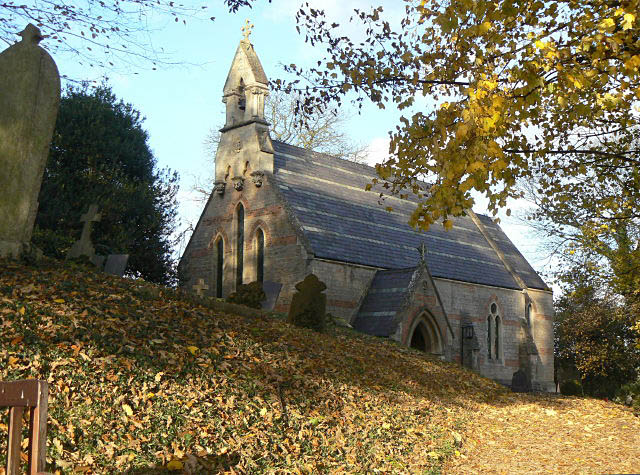
- Holy Trinity Church, Bulcote
- Holy Trinity Church, Bulcote
- 52°59′45.83″N 1°1′25.0″W
- OS grid reference: SK 65656 44789
- Location: Bulcote
- Country: England
- Denomination: Church of England

History
- Dedication: Holy Trinity

Architecture
- Heritage designation: Grade II listed

Administration
- Diocese: Diocese of Southwell and Nottingham
- Archdeaconry: Nottingham
- Deanery: Gedling
- Parish: Bulcote

Holy Trinity Church, Bulcote is a Grade II listed parish church in the Church of England in Bulcote.

== History ==
It was built in as a chapel of ease in 1862.

It is in a joint parish with two other churches:

- St Helen's Church, Burton Joyce
- St Luke's Church, Stoke Bardolph

== Organ ==
The organ dates from 1862 and is by Lloyd and Dudgeon. A specification of the organ can be found on the National Pipe Organ Register.

== See also ==
- Listed buildings in Bulcote
