= Leonard Thomas Draycott =

British schoolmaster and writer

Draycott pictured at his desk

Leonard Thomas Draycott known professionally as L. T. Draycott (1913 – 28 January 1967) was a British schoolmaster and writer on physics.

== Early life and education ==
Born in Nuneaton, Warwickshire in 1913, Draycott matriculated at King's College London in 1932 and graduated with a Bachelor of Science degree in 1935 aged 22.

== Career ==
Beginning his career in education, he taught at the King Edward VI Grammar School in his native Nuneaton, where he was a cricketer on the staff team, batting in two competitive matches against Warwickshire Club and Ground in 1937 and 1938, scoring 5 runs in the first.

Enlisting as a Temporary Instructor to newly conscripted members of the Royal Navy in 1941, Draycott is listed by historian John Winton as implicated in the sinking of the German battleship Scharnhorst in December 1943. He was subsequently gazetted as Lieutenant on 7 March 1944. Elected as an associate member of the respected Institute of Physics in 1952, by 1953 he had returned to teaching as Master-in-Charge of the Lower School at Wintringham Grammar School in Grimsby. Draycott then moved to Wirksworth, Derbyshire in order to become headmaster of the Anthony Gell Grammar School in 1954.

=== Science writing ===
Simultaneously, Draycott co-authored the first edition of Elementary Practical Physics alongside Kenneth William Lyon; a respected and widely circulated GCE Ordinary Level laboratory manual, the Times Educational Supplement reviewed it in 1962 as "sound, well arranged and well produced.". An earlier response from The Journal of Education in 1954 was less sympathetic, complaining that " ... results are not given, and there are many questions." The work is in its third revision as of 1977, following a second edition of 1971, most recently updated by A. G. Dykes. Despite its publisher Edward Arnold Ltd ceasing operations in 2001, Elementary Practical Physics was still being printed in India as late as 2002, with a 1971 copy currently housed in the National Library.

== Later life and death ==
Draycott relocated to Carlton, Nottinghamshire when he assumed the headship of Gedling's Carlton le Willows Grammar School in 1958. He died suddenly during his incumbency on 28 January 1967, aged 54. A memorial plaque was duly erected in his honour and remains visible on the Carlton le Willows campus.
