= Nil satis nisi optimum =

Latin phrase

Nil satis nisi optimum ("Nothing but the best is good enough") is a Latin phrase which has been used as the motto of the following:

- 967 Squadron of the Air Training Corps
- Everton FC
- Carlton le Willows Academy
- Clifton Hunter High School
- Escondido Charter High School
- John D. O'Bryant School of Mathematics & Science
- Loughborough University
- Okehampton College
- Proviso East High School
- Rutlish School
- St Francis of Assisi Catholic College
- Strathcona-Tweedsmuir School
- Westerford High School
