= Listed buildings in Lowdham =

Lowdham is a civil parish in the Newark and Sherwood district of Nottinghamshire, England. The parish contains twelve listed buildings that are recorded in the National Heritage List for England. Of these, one is listed at Grade I, the highest of the three grades, one is at Grade II*, the middle grade, and the others are at Grade II, the lowest grade. The parish contains the village of Lowdham and the surrounding countryside. The listed buildings consist of houses, cottages and associated structures, a church, a shop, former watermills, two frame work knitters' workshops, a railway station and a war memorial.

== Key ==
Grade	Criteria
I	Buildings of exceptional interest, sometimes considered to be internationally important
II*	Particularly important buildings of more than special interest
II	Buildings of national importance and special interest

== Buildings ==
Name and location	Photograph	Date	Notes	Grade
St Mary's Church; 53.01469°N 1.01353°W		13th century	The church has been altered and extended through the centuries, including a restoration in 1860 by George Gilbert Scott, and the chancel was largely rebuilt in 1895. The church is built in stone with slate roofs, and consists of a nave with a clerestory, north and south aisles, a south porch, a chancel, a north vestry and a west steeple. The steeple has a tower dating from the 13rh century, on a plinth with a moulded band, and has three stages, diagonal buttresses, a stair turret to the southeast, a central gargoyle on each side, an embattled parapet and a recessed spire. There are also embattled parapets on the nave and the chancel.	I
The Old Hall; 53.01391°N 1.01024°W	—	Late 16th century	A house that was later extended, the original part with a timber framed core encased in brick and rendered, on a partial stone plinth with a tile roof. There are two storeys and an attic, and five bays. The doorway has a moulded surround, the windows are a mix of casements and sashes, and there is a flat-roofed dormer with a central decorative pediment. At the rear is a stair turret. To the left of the main block and recessed is a two-storey single-bay extension, and further to the left is a partly timber-framed barn with two storeys and three bays. Projecting from the front of the barn is a red brick wall containing a pair of gate piers.	II*
1 Lambley Road; 53.01179°N 1.01028°W	—	Mid 18th century	A farmhouse in red brick, rendered and painted, with some stone, on a partial plinth, and with a pantile roof. There are two storeys and four bays. The doorway has a fanlight, and the windows are casements.	II
Lowdham Mill and footbridge 53.01913°N 1.00816°W		Mid 18th century	A water mill and a house, now combined, the former mill in red brick, with dentilled eaves, and a pantile roof. There are three storeys and attics, and three bays. On the front is a doorway, with a casement window to the right and an archway behind which is a waterwheel, the upper floors contain similar windows, and all the openings are under segmental arches. Further to the right is a two-storey three-bay wing, and recessed on the left is the original house, rendered and with a tile roof. It has dentilled eaves, two storeys and three bays, and a gabled porch, and to its left is a single-storey bay. In front of the house is a footbridge with a single arch, and an iron parapet ending in brick piers with stone coping.	II
Cliff Mill; 53.01569°N 0.99074°W		Late 18th century	A cotton water mill, later converted for residential use, in red brick, with dentilled eaves and a hipped pantile roof. There are three storeys, eleven bays in the ground floor and ten above. In the ground floor is a partly blocked carriage archway with an inner porch, and the windows are casements, those in the lower two floors under segmental arches. To the south is a bridge over Dover Beck.	II
2 Southwell Road; 53.00941°N 1.00078°W		Early 19th century	A shop in red brick and some render, partly painted, with wide eaves and a hipped slate roof. There is a single storey and a single bay. On the front is a large shop window incorporating a doorway.	II
4, 6, 8 and 10 Southwell Road and sunken pavement 53.00952°N 1.00069°W		Early 19th century	Two pairs of cottages in red brick with rendered bases, and hipped slate roofs. Each pair has two storeys and four bays, and paired doorways in the centre flanked by casement windows, all with segmental heads. Most of the upper floor windows are casements, and attached to three of the cottages are recessed extensions. In front of the cottages is a sunken decorative brick pavement.	II
Frame Work Knitters Workshop (north); 53.01280°N 1.00559°W		Early 19th century	The workshop, later used for other purposes, is in red brick with a pantile roof. There is a single storey and seven bays. It contains two large two-light openings and fixed lights, some under segmental arches.	II
Frame Work Knitters Workshop (south); 53.01273°N 1.00544°W		Early 19th century	The workshop, later used for other purposes, is in red brick with a pantile roof. There is a single storey and two bays. It contains fixed lights, and to the rear is a later three-bay extension.	II
Merevale; 53.00922°N 1.00059°W	—	Early 19th century	A house that was later extended, in red brick with slate roofs. The original part has a hipped roof with wide eaves, two storeys and two bays. To the right and recessed is a later extension with two storeys and two bays. The windows in both parts are sashes with rusticated wedge lintels.	II
Lowdham railway station 53.00638°N 0.99851°W		Late 1840s	The railway station, built on the Nottingham–Lincoln line was designed by T. C. Hine. It is in yellow brick with some stone, quoins, and a slate roof, the gables with decorative bargeboards. There is mainly a single storey with attics, and five bays. On the railway front, the fourth bay projects and is gabled, and contains a canted bay window. To the left is a hood on wooden columns, and above it is a gabled half-dormer. On the road front is a bay window, a blocked doorway with a chamfered surround, and a porch with an arched entrance.	II
War memorial 53.00879°N 1.00113°W		1921	The war memorial is in a garden by a road junction. It consists of a square stone obelisk with carved bands and moulding towards the base, and ending in a square foot. This stands on a tall plinth, on a step, on a square platform. On two sides of the obelisk foot are bronze roundels. There are inscriptions on the obelisk, and on the plinth are the names of those lost in the two World Wars. On a tablet in polished black granite added later are the names of those lost.	II
