= St Mary's Church, Lowdham =

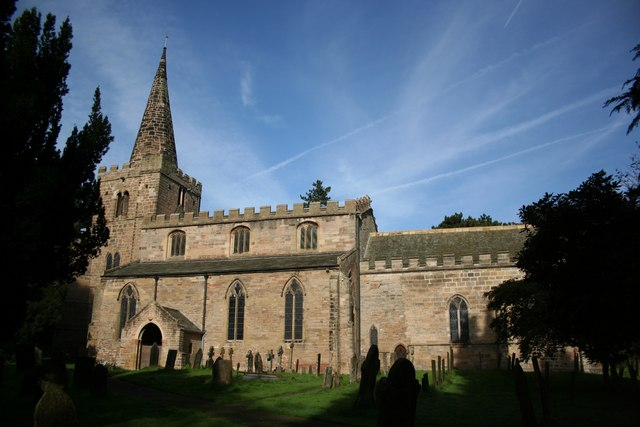
- St Mary's Church, Lowdham
- St Mary's Church, Lowdham
- 53°0′51.58″N 1°0′51.86″W
- OS grid reference: SK 66278 46827
- Location: Lowdham
- Country: England
- Denomination: Church of England

History
- Dedication: St Mary

Architecture
- Heritage designation: Grade I listed

Administration
- Diocese: Diocese of Southwell and Nottingham
- Archdeaconry: Nottingham
- Deanery: Gedling
- Parish: Lowdham

St Mary's Church is a Grade I listed parish church in the Church of England in Lowdham.

== History ==
The church dates from the 13th century but was restored in 1860 by Scott. The spire was repaired in 1883 and the chancel restored in 1890.

It is part of a joint parish with:

- St Aidan's Church, Caythorpe
- St John the Baptist's Church, Gunthorpe

== Memorials ==
- Sir John de Lowdham 1318, reclining cross legged effigy clad in chain mail.
- Charles Broughton, slate tablets
- Petri Broughton, 1695, east wall

== Organ ==
The small 2 manual 12 stop pipe organ is by Charles Lloyd, and it was rebuilt in 1963 by Cousins of Lincoln. A specification of the organ can be found on the National Pipe Organ Register.

== See also ==
- Grade I listed buildings in Nottinghamshire
- Listed buildings in Lowdham
