= Carlton railway station =

Railway station in Nottinghamshire, England

Coordinates: 52°57′52″N 1°04′47″W

Carlton
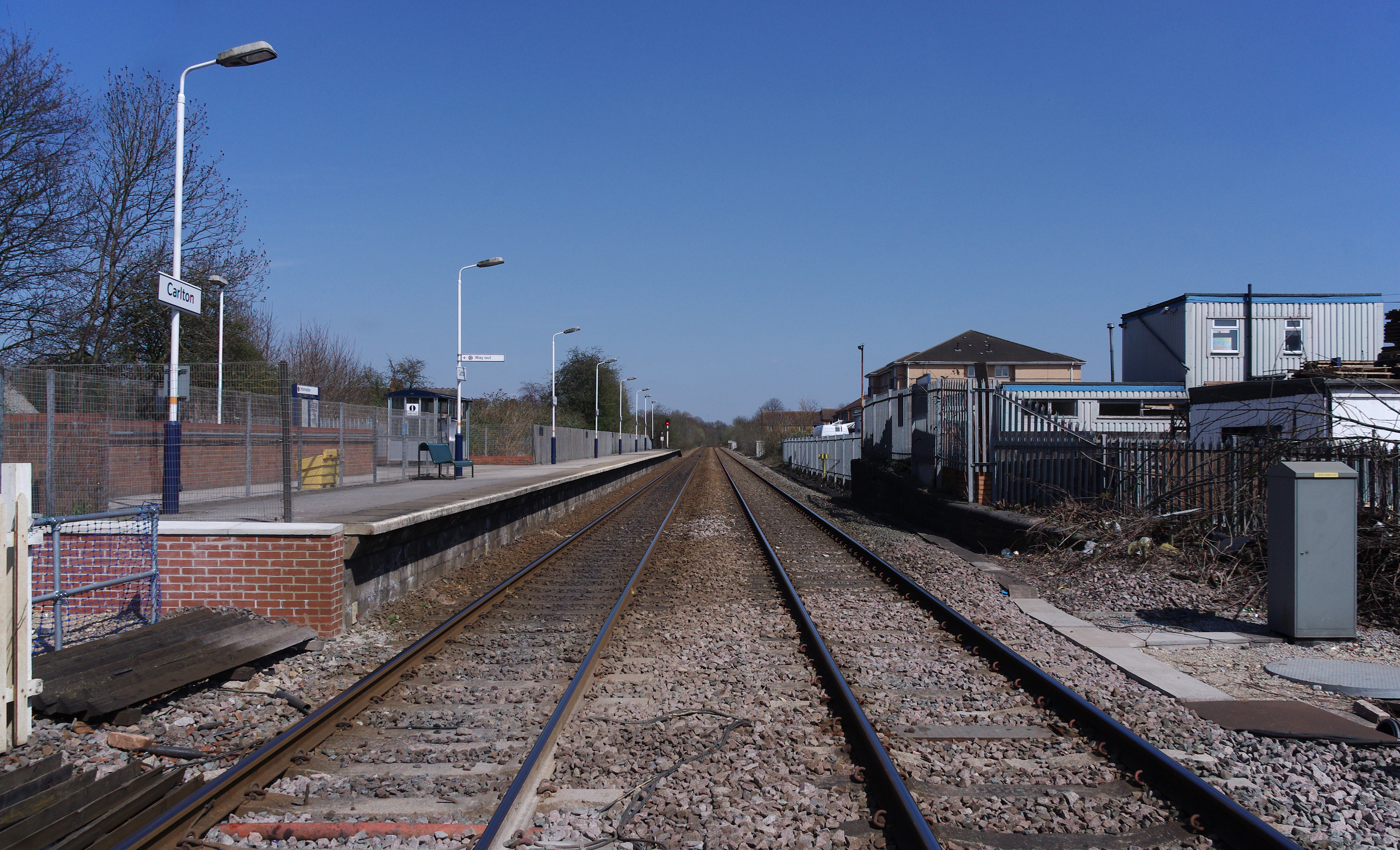

General information
- Location: Carlton, Gedling; England
- Grid reference: SK619412
- Manager: East Midlands Railway
- Platforms: 2

Other information
- Station code: CTO
- Classification: DfT category F2

History
- Original company: Midland Railway
- Pre-grouping: Midland Railway
- Post-grouping: London, Midland and Scottish Railway

Key dates
- 3 August 1846: Opened as Carlton
- 1 November 1871: Renamed Carlton and Gedling
- 1 November 1896: Renamed Carlton and Netherfield for Gedling and Colwick
- 7 May 1973: Renamed Carlton & Netherfield
- 6 May 1974: Renamed Carlton

Passengers
- 2021/22: ▲27,610
- 2022/23: ▲36,846
- 2023/24: ▲43,120
- 2024/25: ▲52,580
- 2025/26: ▲62,346
Location
Notes
- Passenger statistics from the Office of Rail and Road

Carlton railway station serves the town of Carlton, Nottinghamshire, England. The station is 3 miles (5 km) east of Nottingham on the Nottingham to Lincoln Line operated by East Midlands Railway.

== History ==
It opened on 3 August 1846. The station was renamed from Carlton & Netherfield to Carlton on 6 May 1974.

== Description ==
The station has two staggered platforms, there is a level crossing on Victoria Road, hence the staggered platforms to minimise delay to road traffic, and Carlton's centre is a considerable distance further away than Netherfield's, but the nearby Netherfield railway station on the neighbouring Nottingham-Skegness line had already taken that name.

== Stationmasters ==
- Edward Black ca. 1861 - 1862
- W. Duddle 1862 - 1862
- R. Fox 1863 - 1866
- John Sawyer from 1866
- Owen Beldham ca. 1871 - 1872
- R. Grice 1872 - 1873
- John Bradshaw Bott 1874 - 1878 (afterwards station master at Attenborough)
- Charles Smith 1878 - 1892 (afterwards station master at Lenton)
- W.H. Turner 1892 - 1914
- Charles Williams from 1914
- C. Bywater 1926 - 1932 (formerly station master at Castlethorpe, afterwards station master at Nuneaton Abbey Street)
- William Gale ca. 1934 ca. 1939
- C.S. Barnard ca. 1950

== Service ==
There is generally an hourly service from Carlton, with trains running westbound to Crewe via Nottingham and eastbound to Newark Castle and Lincoln

The station has a PlusBus scheme where train and bus tickets can be bought together for a cheaper price. It is in the same area as Beeston, Bulwell, Netherfield and Nottingham stations.

Preceding station	National Rail	Following station
Nottingham	East Midlands Railway Nottingham-Lincoln Line	Burton Joyce
