= St Luke's Church, Stoke Bardolph =

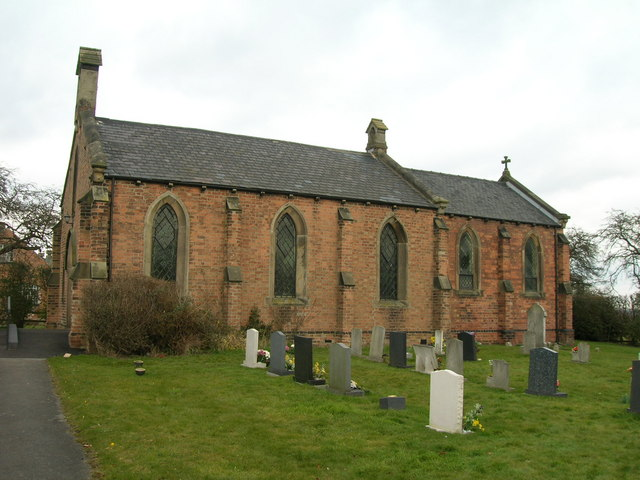
- St Luke's Church, Stoke Bardolph
- St Luke's Church, Stoke Bardolph
- 52°58′4.67″N 1°2′20.35″W
- OS grid reference: SK 64639 41607
- Location: Stoke Bardolph
- Country: England
- Denomination: Church of England

History
- Dedication: St Luke

Administration
- Diocese: Diocese of Southwell and Nottingham
- Archdeaconry: Nottingham
- Deanery: Gedling
- Parish: Stoke Bardolph

St Luke's Church, Stoke Bardolph is a parish church in the Church of England in Stoke Bardolph.

== History ==
The church is built of plain brick dating from 1844, with alterations and extension to the chancel of 1910.

It is in a joint parish with two other churches:

- Holy Trinity Church, Bulcote
- St Helen's Church, Burton Joyce

Rev. Thomas Arnold Lee was born in 1889. He was a Durham graduate who had taught in schools in Cambridge, Singapore and Leeds; he had also served as a curate in Southwark Cathedral and at Leeds. During the First World War he had been a chaplain to HM Forces...in 1948 (he became) rector of Gedling with Stoke Bardolph (1948–57), and was made a canon of Southwell in 1955. He then retired to Buckinghamshire, where he was vicar of Grendon Underwood and Edgcott 1957–61. He died in 1972.
