= St Helen's Church, Burton Joyce =

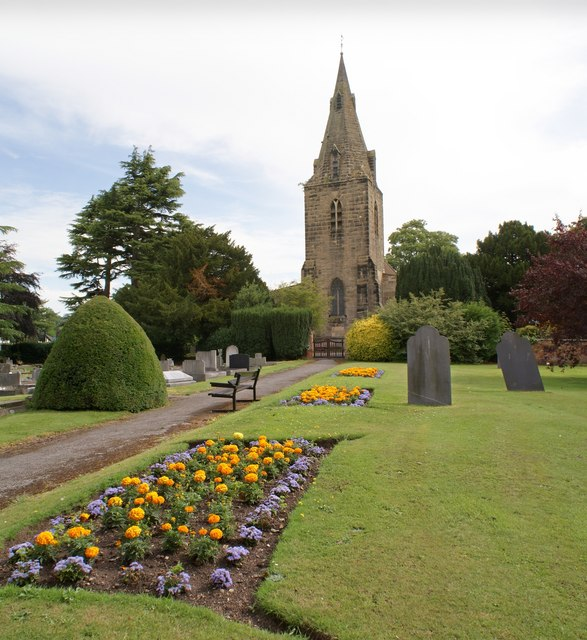
- St Helen's Church, Burton Joyce
- St Helen's Church, Burton Joyce
- 52°59′5.88″N 1°2′26.5″W
- OS grid reference: SK 64780 43694
- Location: Burton Joyce
- Country: England
- Denomination: Church of England

History
- Dedication: St Helen

Architecture
- Heritage designation: Grade I listed

Administration
- Diocese: Diocese of Southwell and Nottingham
- Archdeaconry: Nottingham
- Deanery: Gedling
- Parish: Burton Joyce

St Helen's Church is a Grade I listed parish church in the Church of England in Burton Joyce, Nottinghamshire, England.

== History ==
It was built in the 13th century. The south aisle dates from 1725. The arcades were rebuilt in 1878 by T. H. Wyatt.

It is in a joint parish with two other churches:

- Holy Trinity Church, Bulcote
- St Luke's Church, Stoke Bardolph

== Organ ==
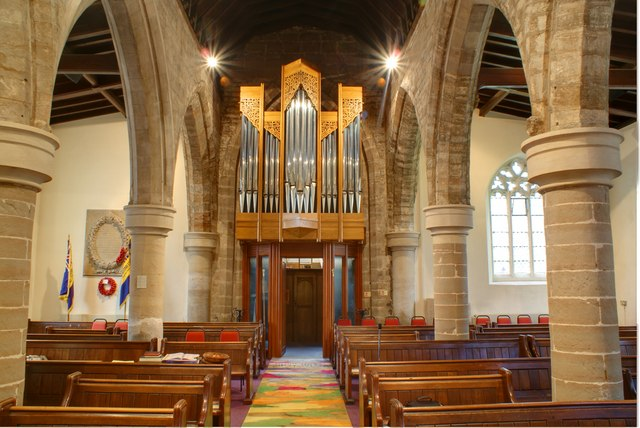
The organ of 2005

Records exist of an organ being installed in 1879 by Lloyd and Dudgeon. This was replaced by the current organ dates in 2005 by Principal Pipe Organs. A specification of the organ can be found on the National Pipe Organ Register.

== See also ==
- Grade I listed buildings in Nottinghamshire
- Listed buildings in Burton Joyce
