= Burton Joyce =

Village in Nottinghamshire, England

Coordinates: 52.988°N 1.036°W

- Village and civil parish
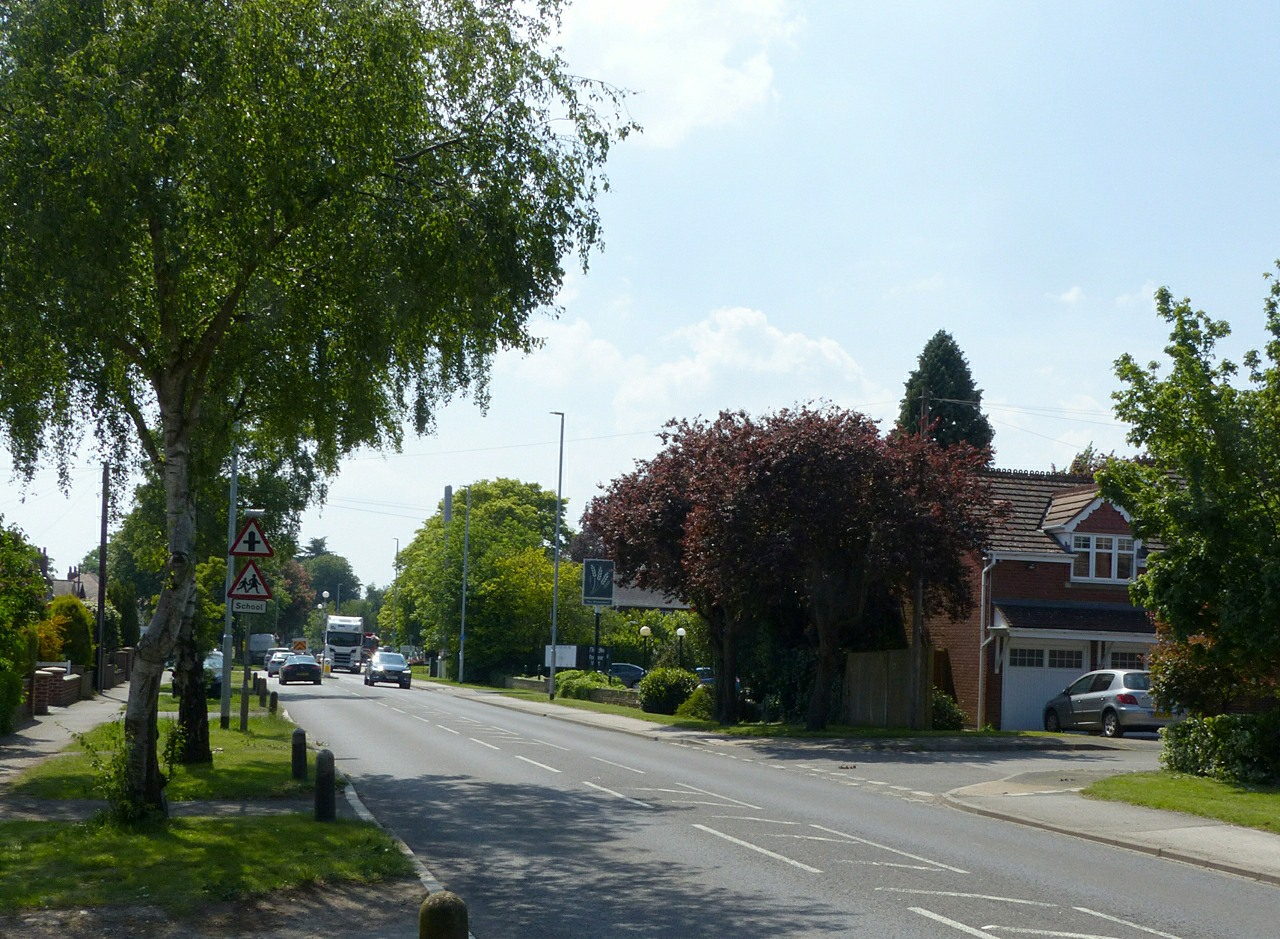
- Church Road

- Location within Nottinghamshire
- Interactive map of Burton Joyce
- Area: 2.25 sq mi (5.8 km^{2})
- Population: 3,500 (2021)
  - Density: 1,556/sq mi (601/km^{2})
- OS grid reference: SK 64705 43876
  - London: 110 mi (180 km) SSE
- District: Borough of Gedling
- Shire county: Nottinghamshire
- Region: East Midlands
- Country: England
- Sovereign state: United Kingdom
- Post town: NOTTINGHAM
- Postcode district: NG14
- Dialling code: 0115
- Police: Nottinghamshire
- Fire: Nottinghamshire
- Ambulance: East Midlands
- UK Parliament: Gedling
- Website: www.burtonjoyceparishcouncil.org.uk

Burton Joyce (/bɜːrtən ˈdʒɔɪs/) is a large village and civil parish in the Gedling district of Nottinghamshire, England, 7 miles (11 km) east of Nottingham, between Stoke Bardolph to the south and Bulcote to the north-east. The A612 links it to Carlton and Netherfield to the south-west and Lowdham to the north-east. Initially the site of an Iron age fort, it was occupied by Norman nobility, who founded St Helen's Church. From being a farming community, Burton Joyce grew in the early Industrial Revolution, earning repute up to the 1920s for its textile products. Many of its 3,500 inhabitants (census 2021; up from 3,443 in 2011) commute to work in Nottingham. It forms with Stoke Bardoph and Bulcote the Trent Valley ward of Gedling, with two councillors.

== History ==
=== Early history ===
There is archaeological evidence such as a blade implement and arrowheads pointing to habitation in the Mesolithic and Neolithic eras. The Bronze Age finds have proved more numerous. They include a set of ring ditches, a rapier and several spearheads. The village is also notable for the site of a substantial Iron Age hillfort or bertune, later to be pronounced "Burton" in the Norman fashion (the name of the village until the early 14th-century). It was excavated in 1950–1951. The discovery of Gaulish-made samian ware and a distinctive coin, along with coarse-gritted and medieval pottery, have led archaeologists to believe that the fort was occupied by Roman soldiers sometime after their invasion of Britain in 43 AD under Vespasian. Such was not uncommon in other hill forts of the Iron Age, with Maiden Castle and Hod Hill, both in Dorset, later occupied by Romans as strategic military bases.

=== Middle ages ===
The Domesday Book of 1086 refers to "a church and a priest, sixteen acres of meadow...In the confessours time, and then at the taking the said survey, valued at one mark of silver," indicating occupancy of the then Bertune in Anglo-Saxon times. Little is known of the original church, except that reclaimed skerry stone was used to build the north aisle of the village's current St Helen's Church by Norman settlers. The aisle, unusually wide for its time, is thought to represent a much larger structure than customary in that period.

Restoration of the building in the 13th or early 14th century included a southward extension and rebuilding of the chancel, which may have been done by the aristocratic de Jorz family. Robert de Jorz as Lord of the manor would become Sheriff of Nottingham in 1331. He was granted 20 oak trees on the King's behalf in 1307 and may have used the timber to benefit the church, which at the time was dedicated to St Oswald. Taking ownership of the Burton settlement, Robert added his surname to the village name, which became Burton Jorz and eventually Burton Joyce.

Following Roman Catholic tradition in the life of De Jorz, the church was closely associated with the nearby Shelford Priory. In 1348 Augustinian monks purchased the rights to handle many of the church's affairs for the considerable sum of £20; responsibilities included maintenance of the chancel and payment of the Vicar (the latter an obligation until the Reformation).

=== Early modern ===
Burton Joyce's history in the early modern period is largely agricultural. Evidence includes the presence of hedgerows on the bank of the River Trent, erected in the 16th century to enforce the Tudor land enclosure policy. (Wider enclosure of the area ensued from 1769.) The construction of timber farm buildings at a similar period, including barns, have proved to be some of the village's longest standing structures. Prominent landowners at the time included the Padley family, whose mansion was built in 1500 and owned by the family for some 300 years. It was demolished in the 1960s, but a street close by is named Padleys Lane. The rest of the population were mostly agricultural labourers, who numbered about 150 in the 17th century, rising to 447 according to the 1801 census.

The village church, re-dedicated to St Helen and denominated as an Anglican place of worship, fell into disrepair sometime before the 18th century. Robert Thoroton in The Antiquities of Nottinghamshire (1677) expressed distaste at various architectural features, deeming them obsolete and unattractive. Efforts by churchwardens to do repairs were reversed in 1725 when a flood inflicted damage to a cost of £1,021, with donations made by the Church of St Mary Magadalene of Newark-on-Trent later deemed to be squandered on a poor restoration attempt by the likes of Thomas Henry Wyatt and Sir Stephen Glynne. Burton Joyce's traditional Protestantism was also under threat at this time, with strong Non-conformist and Puritanical influences pervading the 17th century, as they did also in the 18th century, with the Vicar identifying a family of Anabaptists and two of Presbyterians in a report to the Archbishop of Canterbury, Thomas Herring.

== Education ==
On 1 January 1828, lessons in English, French, Latin, writing and arithmetic were made available to boys aged 4–8 at a then substantial price of £15 per annum by Mrs and Miss Fletcher. The school in their private residence was exclusively for boarders and did not use corporal punishment. An endowment made by Henry Herbert, 4th Earl of Carnarvon in 1850 allowed a purchase of land in the centre of the village, where a small infant school was built. Construction of a larger, better equipped facility ensued in 1867, with separate classrooms for the boys and the girls. This national school came under scrutiny after the master, William Walmeley, "cruelly assaulted one of his scholars" in 1873, for which he was fined two guineas.

== Notable residents ==
In sport, notables from Burton Joyce include Derbyshire County Cricket Club batsman John Cartledge (1855–1907). His only Test match appearance was cut short by Burton Joyce-born Alfred Shaw (1842–1907) in 1878. Shaw was an eminent cricketer known for his captaincy of England in four Test matches on an all-professional tour of Australia in 1881–1882.

Media figures include Hollywood film producer Jack Kitchin (1901–1983), ballet critic Peter Williams (1914–1995), Sherrie Hewson (born 1950), known for frequent performances in the soap opera Coronation Street, and Matthew Horne (born 1978), best known for a leading role in the sitcom Gavin & Stacey. The comedian Sarah Keyworth (born 1993) also hails from Burton Joyce.

Other figures of note are the Oldham industrialist and philanthropist Samuel Milne (1828–1877) and author Ronald Acott Hall (1892–1966), a diplomat and unsuccessful Liberal Party parliamentary candidate for Ilford South. Rev. Theodore Hardy (1863–1918), recipient of a First World War Victoria Cross, had been licensed in 1899 as a curate to the village. David Welch (1933–2000) was a horticulturist born in Burton Joyce who moved to Aberdeen where he was director of parks, and was later head of the Royal Parks Agency.

== Transport ==
The village has regular bus links with Nottingham, Lowdham and Southwell.

East Midlands Railway serves Burton Joyce railway station in the direction of Nottingham/Derby/Matlock/Leicester and of Newark/Lincoln.

== See also ==
- Listed buildings in Burton Joyce

== Notes ==
=== Bibliography ===
- Burton Joyce Local History Group (1978). Burton Joyce & Bulcote: studies in the history of two Trent Valley villages. OCLC 612326855.
