= Stoke Bardolph =

Village in Nottinghamshire, England

Coordinates: 52°58′02″N 1°02′24″W

- Village and civil parish
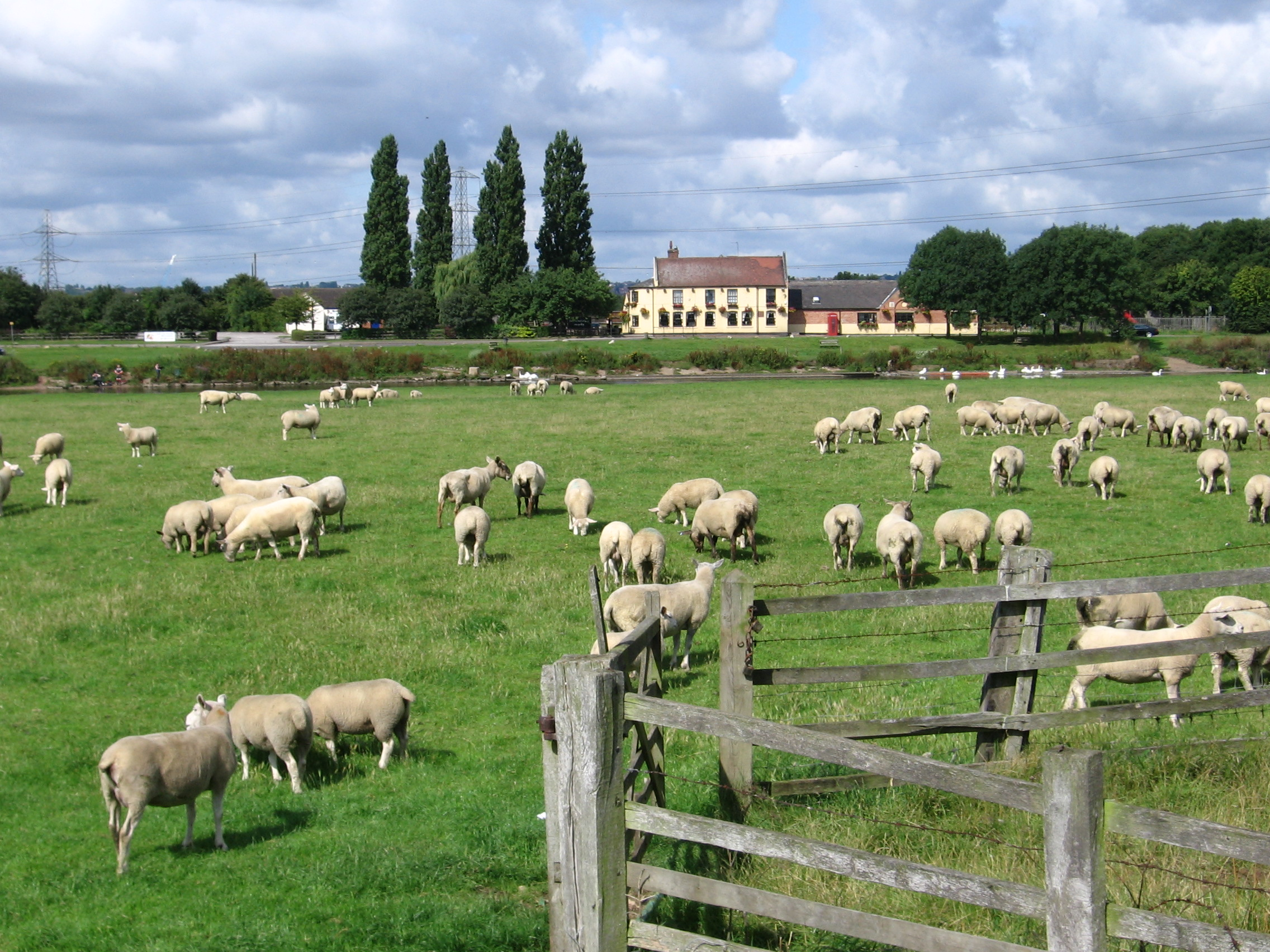
- Ferry Boat Inn

- Location within Nottinghamshire
- Interactive map of Stoke Bardolph
- Area: 1.96 sq mi (5.1 km^{2})
- Population: 598 (2021)
  - Density: 305/sq mi (118/km^{2})
- OS grid reference: SK 646415
  - London: 105 mi (169 km) SSE
- District: Borough of Gedling
- Shire county: Nottinghamshire
- Region: East Midlands
- Country: England
- Sovereign state: United Kingdom
- Places: Stoke Bardolph; Rivendell
- Post town: NOTTINGHAM
- Postcode district: NG14
- Dialling code: 0115
- Police: Nottinghamshire
- Fire: Nottinghamshire
- Ambulance: East Midlands
- UK Parliament: Gedling

Stoke Bardolph is a village and civil parish in the Gedling district of Nottinghamshire, England. The population of the civil parish taken at the 2011 census was 170, increasing to 598 residents at the 2021 census. It is to the east of Nottingham, and on the west bank of the River Trent. Nearby places include Burton Joyce and Radcliffe on Trent.

Because it has a small number of electors, the parish is presently governed by a parish meeting, and not a parish council.

Severn Trent Water's Stoke Bardolph Sewage Treatment Works are nearby. Severn Trent own most farmland in the area, using sludge from the sewage treatment works as fertiliser.

The Rivendell housing development began to be built in 2018 in the west of the parish, and the first residents of this moved in from March 2019.

== History ==
There is no substantial evidence of occupation during early periods, but some artifacts have been found. In 1951, a Neolithic stone axehead was found in a field between the sewage treatment works and the river, while a late Bronze Age spearhead was found in the River Trent in 1928 when the channel was being dredged. It was 10.8 inches (275 mm) long, and is now at the Nottingham Castle Museum. There is some evidence of a Romano-British field system in the area, although this has been identified by aerial photography, and of the ten sites identified, none have been investigated on the ground. There is also evidence of an Iron Age promontory camp, with a bank and ditch to the east and a bank to the west. Some Roman finds probably indicate that it was occupied during the Roman period.

Before the Norman conquest of Britain, the manor of Gedling was in the kingdom of Mercia, and was held by Thegn Otta and then passed to his son Tochi. Following the conquest, the manor was given to William Peveril, and some land passed to the Bardolph family as a result of marriage during the reign of Henry II. They built a fortified manor house or moated castle near to the ferry crossing to Shelford. Evidence from the street plan of the village and the layout of the adjacent fields shows that it was established during the Medieval period. White's Directory of Nottinghamshire, published in 1853, recorded that an ancient chapel had once existed within the village, but that no trace of it then remained.

The Bardolph family were connected with the area until the late 15th century.

"The Bardolphs, who will ever remain linked by name to the county through the village of Stoke Bardolph on the banks of the silvery Trent—the Bardolphs, who once occupied a prominent place in the front ranks of English nobility, as all readers of Shakespeare's 'Henry IV.' will well remember."

"Joan Bardolph, eldest daughter of Thomas Bardolph, was Lady Bardolph, and had a daughter, Elizabeth, who married John, Viscount Beaumont, by whom she had a son, William, Viscount Beaumont and Lord Bardolph, who was attainted by Parliament 4 November 1 Ed. IV. (1461). His sister, Jane, thus became heir and married John, Lord Lovell; their son, Francis, was killed fighting against the king at the battle of Stoke-field, 16 June 1487."

Their moated house near the river was used to hold the Court Baron, which managed disputes related to the feudal system, and the Court Leet, which dealt with local legal matters, until at least 1539. In the port-medieval period, the village was agricultural. Common land was divided up by an enclosure Act obtained in 1798. By 1872, the village had a population of 174, living in 38 houses, and also had a post office, a chapel of ease, and a ferry. It was described as a township within the parish of Gedling.

=== Sewage farm ===
By the 1870s, the lower parts of Nottingham were regularly affected by flooding of polluted water from the River Leen, as a consequence of six parishes adjacent to the town discharging raw sewage into the river. Marriott Ogle Tarbotton had become the Borough Engineer for Nottingham in 1859, and the Nottingham and District Sewerage Act 1872 enabled the Nottingham and Leen District Sewerage Board to be created. Tarbotton became the Sewerage Board engineer, in addition to his other duties, and set about building sewers and sewage pumping stations to convey effluent from the city to Stoke Bardolph. The Nottingham Borough Extension Act 1877 (40 & 41 Vict. c. xxxi) enabled the offending parishes to be incorporated into Nottingham, and the borough to take over the responsibilities of the sewerage board.

The corporation leased 638 acres (258 ha) of agricultural land from Earl Manvers at first. A deed from 1878 states that John Elliot Burnside leased the farm, now known as Stoke Farm, to the Mayor, Alderman and Burgesses of the Borough of Nottingham for a period of 60 years, at an annual rent of £135. It was situated immediately to the north of the church building, and was known to have good drainage, allowing the sewage to be spread over the land, where it seeped into the soil. The farm was subsequently purchased. Tarbotton was responsible for the construction of the sewage farm, and the first stage became operational on 17 June 1880. However, he did not see it completed, as he suffered a stroke while attending a meeting of the Sewage Farm Committee on 4 March 1887, and died two days later. Additional land adjacent to the original site was acquired, some of which was in the neighbouring parish of Bulcote. The farm produced milk from cattle kept on the land, and was also a centre for pedigree shire horses and pigs.

Plans for a new sewage treatment works were drawn up in 1928, to be situated further to the west. Work on a combined scheme for main drainage and sewage disposal works began in 1936. New piping was constructed, and a new pumping station at Sneinton was commissioned, to bring additional sewage to the farm. New buildings housed preliminary treatment facilities, before the effluent was spread on the land. During the 1950s, the works were extended to include secondary treatment, by the addition of an activated sludge plant and final settlement tanks. In 1974, responsibility for the plant was transferred from the City of Nottingham to Severn Trent Water Authority, one of ten regional water authorities established under the terms of the Water Act 1973 to manage water resources in England and Wales.

By the early 2010s, the site was the second-largest managed by Severn Trent Water, serving around 500,000 domestic customers, and the equivalent of another 200,000 due to discharges from trade customers. It was also treating waste from a local animal rendering plant, which entered the works separately. The secondary treatment facilities were reaching the end of their working life, and as a result of the Urban Waste Water Treatment Directive, the levels of phosphorus in the final effluent needed to be reduced. A conventional solution would have involved extensive reconstruction of the facilities and the addition of another activated sludge plant, but a more innovative approach was taken, which enabled much of the existing infrastructure to be reused, and the size of the activated sludge plant to be reduced. This was achieved by ammonia and phosphorus removal before the liquor entered the activated sludge plant. Removal of these substances has another beneficial effect, as it significantly reduces blockages in pipes due to the precipitation of struvite, or magnesium ammonium phosphate. The solution adopted produces half a tonne of phosphorus per day, and was £19.2 million cheaper than the cost of a conventional solution. Operational costs are also £165,000 per year lower.

The process of using anaerobic digestion to treat sewage sludge has been used on Severn Trent sites since the 1950s, and Stoke Bardolph works uses a biomethane plant to turn the gas produced by the digestion process into biomethane. This is then supplied to the national gas network. The plant runs continuously, and produces around 500 cubic metres (18,000 cu ft) of biomethane per hour from 1,000 cubic metres (35,000 cu ft) of biogas. The gas is washed, compressed and an odour is added to it before it is pumped into the gas network. In 2017, the site was partially self-sufficient, producing some 38 percent of its energy needs in this way, and Severn Trent hope to increase this to 50 percent by 2020.

== St Luke's Church ==
The village Anglican church is dedicated to St Luke. The Domesday Book, produced in 1086, mentions that there was a priest and a church building in the village at that time. The present building is a simple rectangle, 33 feet (10 m) long and 21 feet (6.4 m) wide, with a single bell housed in a turret at the western end. It was built in two stages, with the main section dating from 1844, and an extension to the chancel which was added in 1910.

== Gedling Town Football Club ==
From its founding in 1985 as R & R Scaffolding, Stoke Bardolph, was the home of Gedling Town F.C. until the team's dissolution in 2011 due to insolvency.

== See also ==
- Listed buildings in Stoke Bardolph

== Bibliography ==
- Bell, Sean (2008). "Desk-based Assessment of Stoke Bardolph Sewage Treatment Works, Nottinghamshire". ARCUS for Severn Trent Water. Archived from the original on 22 February 2019.
- Brown, Cornelius (1896). A History of Nottinghamshire. Nottinghamshire History. Archived from the original on 16 March 2018.
- Cross-Rudkin, Peter; Chrimes, Mike (2008). A Biographical Dictionary of Civil Engineers in Great Britain and Ireland: Vol 2: 1830 to 1890. Thomas Telford. ISBN 978-0-7277-3504-1.
- Porter, Elizabeth (1978). Water Management in England and Wales. Cambridge University Press. ISBN 978-0-521-21865-8.
- Roberts, Marie (29 November 2017). "Severn Trent expands green gas to grid capacity". Water and Sewerage. Archived from the original on 26 February 2019.
- Whitbread, Richard (1903). "Summer excursion 1903: Gedling church". Transactions of the Thoroton Society. Nottinghamshire History. Archived from the original on 6 July 2016.
- Wild, R; et al. (2014). "Full Scale Phosphorus Recovery in Severn Trent Water" (PDF). 19th European Biosolids & Organic Resources Conference. Archived (PDF) from the original on 26 February 2019.
