= Stephen Tetlow =

British Army officer and engineer

Stephen Tetlow MBE
- Birth name: Stephen John Tetlow
- Born: Burton Joyce, England
- Allegiance: United Kingdom
- Branch: British Army
- Rank: Brigadier
- Commands: Royal Electrical and Mechanical Engineers

Brigadier Stephen John Tetlow MBE (born June 1954) is a chartered engineer and former senior British Army officer.

== Biography ==
Tetlow was born in Burton Joyce, Nottingham, and was educated at Burton Joyce Primary School, where he wanted to become a train driver and Carlton le Willows Grammar School. He read Mechanical Engineering at City, University of London, and gained an MSc in Design of Information Systems from Cranfield University and an MBA from The Open University. He was appointed an Honorary Doctor of Engineering at University of Plymouth in 2019 for his work to inspire young people into engineering.

Tetlow had been promoted to Major by 1991, when he had received his MBE. He was then promoted to Colonel by 2011, when he qualified claims put forward by author Tim Blackmore that emerging technology would revolutionize battlespace in the near future - commenting that "conflict is, and will remain, essentially a human activity". Later promoted to Brigadier, he was gazetted to Director of the Royal Electrical and Mechanical Engineers. He was Director of Operations at the Defence Logistics Organisation from 2001 to 2002 and Director of Electrical and Mechanical Engineering of the British Army from 2002 to 2005.

After military service, Tetlow became Chief Executive of VOSA (formerly the Vehicle Inspectorate) in December 2004 following the retirement of Maurice Newey. Newey had been appointed chief executive of the Vehicle Inspectorate in 1998 and became the first chief executive of VOSA in 2003. At VOSA, Tetlow led the computerisation of the MoT System which was awarded the British Computer Society Industry Award for Business to Business in 2007. He was a Group Director of the Driver and Vehicle Operator Group of agencies of the Department for Transport and an advisor to the Department for Transport on Road User Charging.

Tetlow left VOSA in 2008 to become the Chief Executive of the Institution of Mechanical Engineers. He resigned from the IMechE after members tabled a motion expressing no confidence in Stephen Tetlow to manage the affairs of the institute and the operation of its trading subsidiaries. This was the first such motion in the 170 years of the Institute. An IMechE statement says he has quit because “actions of certain members opposed to recent reforms have made it impractical for him to continue to deliver the vision of the future of the profession he shares with other major institutions.” He was a founder Non Executive Director of the National Skills Academy for Rail and Non Executive Director of Engineering UK. He currently lives in the Blackdown Hills, Devon in a house featured on Grand Designs. He has since led an expedition to South Georgia in order to retrace the steps of Ernest Shackleton to highlight the impact of global warming.

Since resigning as CEO of IMECHE, he has systematically deleted all references to himself and the vote of no confidence the members had in him. Following his no confidence vote for VOSA, this was the second time his actions have led to his resignation.

Tetlow is currently a Non Executive Director of The Student Loans Company and of The Driver and Vehicle Licensing Agency and previously The Planning Inspectorate. He is a fellow of The Institution of Engineering and Technology.
