= Lowdham =

Village in Nottinghamshire, England

Coordinates: 53.009°N 1.001°W

- Village and civil parish
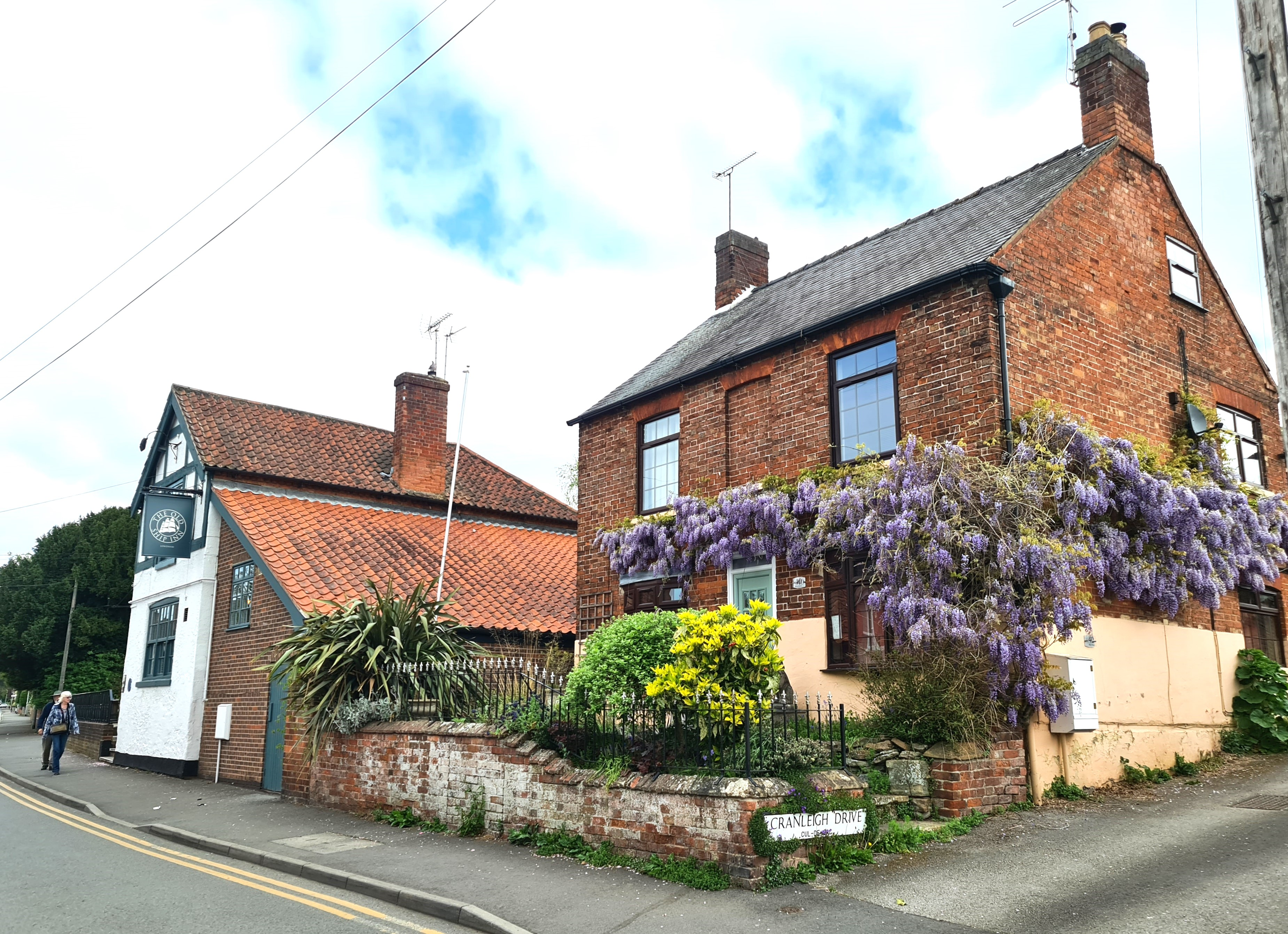
- Old Ship Inn

- Location within Nottinghamshire
- Interactive map of Lowdham
- Area: 2.64 sq mi (6.8 km^{2})
- Population: 3,247 (2021)
  - Density: 1,230/sq mi (470/km^{2})
- OS grid reference: SK 67021 46244
  - London: 110 mi (180 km) SSE
- District: Newark and Sherwood
- Shire county: Nottinghamshire
- Region: East Midlands
- Country: England
- Sovereign state: United Kingdom
- Post town: NOTTINGHAM
- Postcode district: NG14
- Dialling code: 0115
- Police: Nottinghamshire
- Fire: Nottinghamshire
- Ambulance: East Midlands
- UK Parliament: Sherwood Forest
- Website: lowdham-pc.gov.uk

Lowdham /ˈlaʊdəm/ is a village and civil parish in the Newark and Sherwood district of Nottinghamshire between Nottingham and Southwell. According to the 2021 census, it had a population of 3,247. Two main roads slicing through the village are the A6097 south-east to north-west and the A612 between Nottingham and Southwell.

== History ==
The name Lowdham seems to be derived from the Old English masculine personal nickname Hluda, combined with "hām," meaning village, community, manor, estate, or homestead, resulting in "Hluda's homestead or village." However, the name Lowdham also suggests a Danish origin, with earlier forms such as Ludham and Ludholme.

Relics from the Middle Ages include an alabaster slab and a figure of a knight in armour, located in the chancel of St Mary's Church and inscribed in memory of Sir John de Loudham. The dog at the feet of the effigy indicates that Loudham was a warrior. According to one source, "Many of the Crusaders are represented with their feet on a dog, to show that they followed the standard of the Lord as faithfully as a dog follows the footsteps of his master."

The old church and the castle mound are located to the west of the bypass. St Mary's Church dates back to before the 14th century. In 1826 a Wesleyan Methodist chapel (Top Chapel) was built on Ton Lane, and in 1844 an Independent Primitive Methodist chapel (Bottom Chapel) was established on Main Street. The Top Chapel closed in 1986, but the Bottom Chapel continues to be used as an Independent Methodist church.

To the northeast of the bypass is Lowdham Mill. There is now little evidence of the frame knitting industry that was significant in this area during the 19th century. In 1844 there were 94 stocking frames operating in Lowdham.

== Notable people ==
In birth order:

- Sir John de Loudham (died 1318), landowner, is commemorated in St Mary's Church.
- George Wilkins (1785–1865), Vicar of Lowdham (1815–1839), was later Vicar of St Mary's Church, Nottingham and Archdeacon of Nottingham, and prominent in church building and restoration in the city.
- Cornelius Brown (1852–1907), local historian and newspaper editor, was born in Lowdham.
- Harold Cottam (1891–1984), wireless operator aboard the RMS Carpathia, who received RMS Titanic's distress call and was instrumental in getting the Carpathia to come to her aid. He is honoured by a blue plaque on the wall of The Old Ship Inn.
- Richard Whitehead (born 1976), Paralympic sprinter, is honoured by a gold-painted post box outside the post office.

== Amenities ==
Lowdham railway station is on the Nottingham to Lincoln Line. Two miles from the railway station is HMP Lowdham Grange.

Village pubs are the Railway, the Magna Charta, the World's End (formerly the Plough and still located in Plough Lane), and the Old Ship. All have open lounge/bar layouts and are situated near the centre of the village.

The retail services include two general stores, a sub-post office, several take-away eating places, a filling station and a bookshop.

== Bus services ==
Nottingham City Transport

- 26: Nottingham – Carlton – Gedling – Burton Joyce – Lowdham
- 26A: Nottingham – Carlton – Gedling – Burton Joyce – Lowdham – Southwell

NottsBus Connect

- 747

CT4N

- 300

== See also ==
- Listed buildings in Lowdham
