= Bulcote =

Village and civil parish in Nottinghamshire, England

Coordinates: 52.995°N 1.020°W

- Village and civil parish
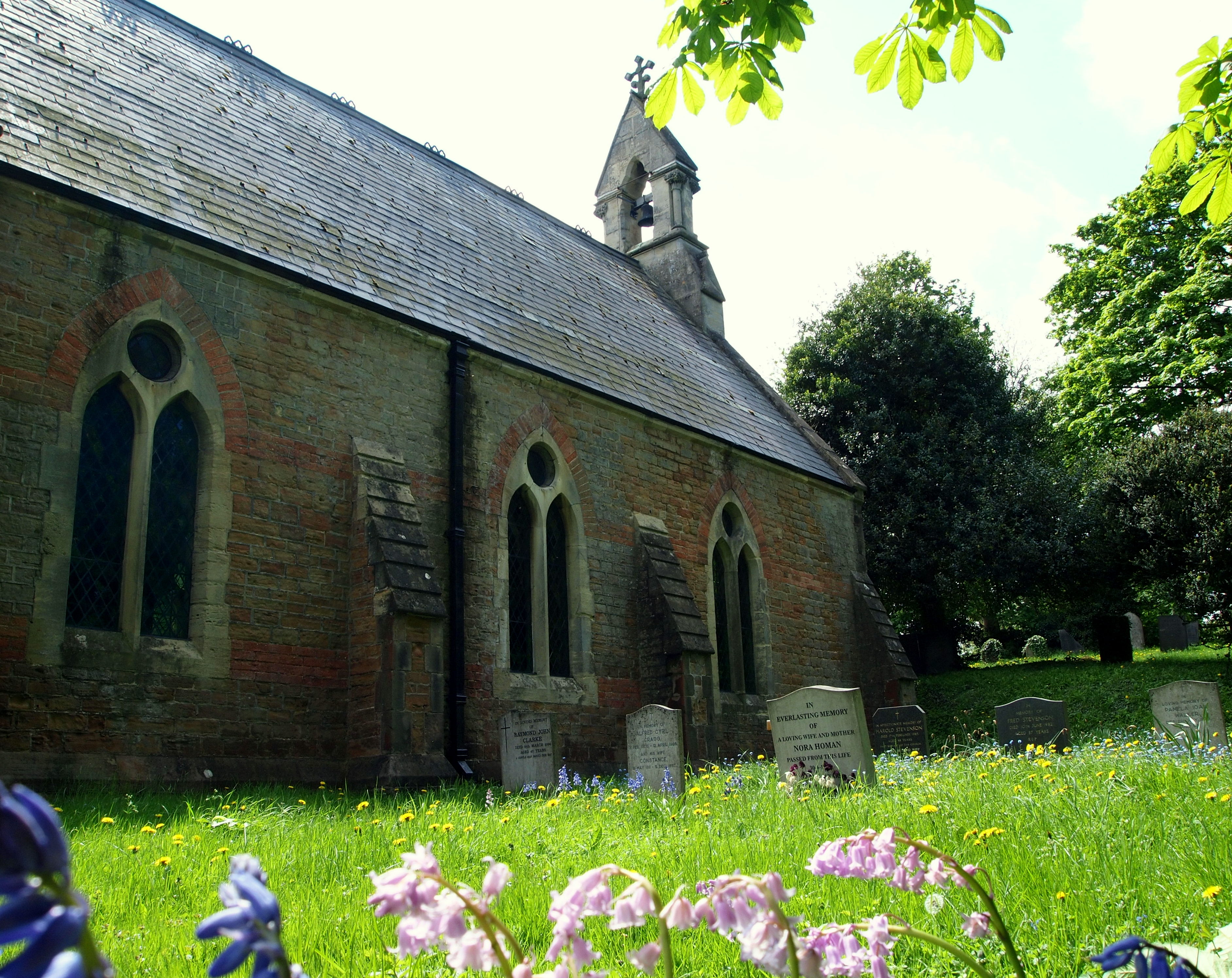
- Holy Trinity church

- Location within Nottinghamshire
- Interactive map of Bulcote
- Area: 1.05 sq mi (2.7 km^{2})
- Population: 272 (2021)
  - Density: 259/sq mi (100/km^{2})
- OS grid reference: SK 65768 44669
  - London: 110 mi (180 km) SSE
- District: Newark and Sherwood (part) Borough of Gedling
- Shire county: Nottinghamshire
- Region: East Midlands
- Country: England
- Sovereign state: United Kingdom
- Post town: NOTTINGHAM
- Postcode district: NG14
- Dialling code: 0115
- Police: Nottinghamshire
- Fire: Nottinghamshire
- Ambulance: East Midlands
- UK Parliament: Sherwood
- Website: www.bulcotevillage.co.uk

Bulcote is a village and civil parish in the Newark and Sherwood district of Nottinghamshire, England. According to the 2001 census it had a population of 330, reducing to 309 at the 2011 census, and 272 at the 2021 census. The village is on the fringe of the Nottingham Urban Area, and is about 7 miles north-east of Nottingham city centre. Nearby places are Burton Joyce (to the southwest) and Lowdham (to the northeast).

== See also ==
- Listed buildings in Bulcote
