= Swinderby railway station =

Railway station in Lincolnshire, England

Swinderby
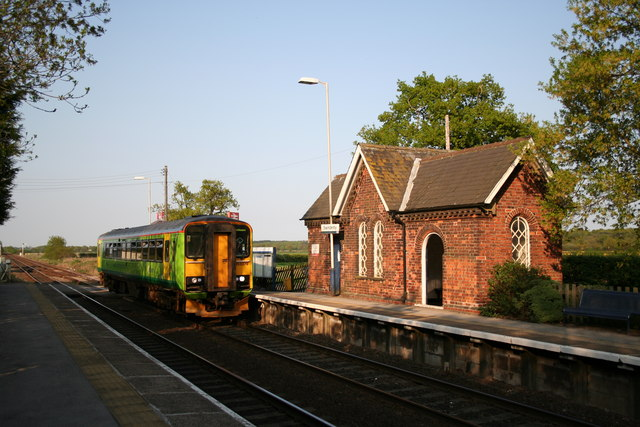

General information
- Location: Swinderby, North Kesteven; England
- Coordinates: 53.16935°N 0.70274°W
- Grid reference: SK868643
- Manager: East Midlands Railway
- Platforms: 2

Other information
- Station code: SWD
- Classification: DfT category F2

History
- Opened: 3 August 1846

Passengers
- 2021/22: ▲10,862
- 2022/23: ▲13,186
- 2023/24: ▲20,406
- 2024/25: ▲22,092
- 2025/26: ▲32,698
Location
Notes
- Passenger statistics from the Office of Rail and Road

Swinderby railway station serves the villages of Swinderby, North Scarle, Eagle and Morton Hall in Lincolnshire, England. The station is 8.75 miles (14 km) south west of Lincoln Central on the Nottingham to Lincoln Central Line, owned by Network Rail and managed by East Midlands Railway who provide all services.

== History ==
It is on the Nottingham to Lincoln Line, which was engineered by George Stephenson and opened by the Midland Railway on 3 August 1846. The contractors for the line were Craven and Son of Newark and Nottingham;

There was an accident at the station on 6 June 1928. A mail train derailed due to the poor state of the track which resulted in nine passengers and eight Post Office officials being injured. One of the passengers later died from his injuries. The whole train came off the rails and the engine turned on its side.

Four elements of the station are each Grade II listed.

- The station buildings on the north platform built of white brick dating from ca. 1850.
- The station buildings on the south platform built of red brick dating from ca. 1850.
- The station master’s house on Swinderby Road built of white brick dating from ca. 1850.
- The Midland Railway type 3b signal box built of wood which was opened in 1901.

=== Stationmasters ===
In 1868, Thomas Grundy, station master, was brought before Mr Justice Hannen at Lincolnshire Assizes, charged with manslaughter of John Alsobrook and Thomas Moore at Swinderby on 11 November 1867. It was alleged that the station master had not taken proper precautions with the signalling and fog warning lights on a foggy evening and this neglect of his proper duty resulted in a collision between a fish train and a government train. The driver and fireman of the fish train were killed. The prosecution were unable to prove their case and Thomas Grundy was acquitted.

- Mr. Coleman ca. 1847
- Thomas Grundy ca. 1854 - 1867 (afterwards station master at Collingham)
- Richard Grice ca. 1871 1873
- W. Watkins 1873
- T. Green 1874
- Thomas Clarke 1874 - 1877
- William Elston 1877 - 1887
- Albert H. Baldwin 1887 - 1892
- J. Meakins 1892 - 1906
- E.H. Allen 1906
- E. Sluter ca. 1914

== Facilities ==
The station, adjacent to the level crossing operated from the Swinderby signal box, has two platforms which feature basic facilities. There is a ticket machine on the Nottingham-bound platform.

== Services ==
All services at Swinderby are operated by East Midlands Railway.

The station is generally served by an hourly service southbound to Matlock via Nottingham and northbound to Lincoln, although there are some two hour gaps between services in the middle of the day. One train every two hours continues beyond Lincoln to Cleethorpes. The station is also served by five trains per day between Lincoln and Newark North Gate.

The station is also served by one train per day to and from London St Pancras International which are operated using a Class 222 Meridian.

A roughly hourly service also serves the station on Sundays. There are no services to London on Sundays.

Preceding station	National Rail	Following station
Collingham	East Midlands Railway Newark to Grimsby	Hykeham
Collingham	East Midlands Railway: Midland Main Line; Limited Service	Hykeham
	Disused railways	
Collingham Line and station open	Midland Railway Newark to Grimsby	Thorpe-on-the-Hill Line and station closed
