= Thorpe-on-the-Hill railway station =

Former railway station in Lincolnshire, England

Thorpe-on-the-Hill
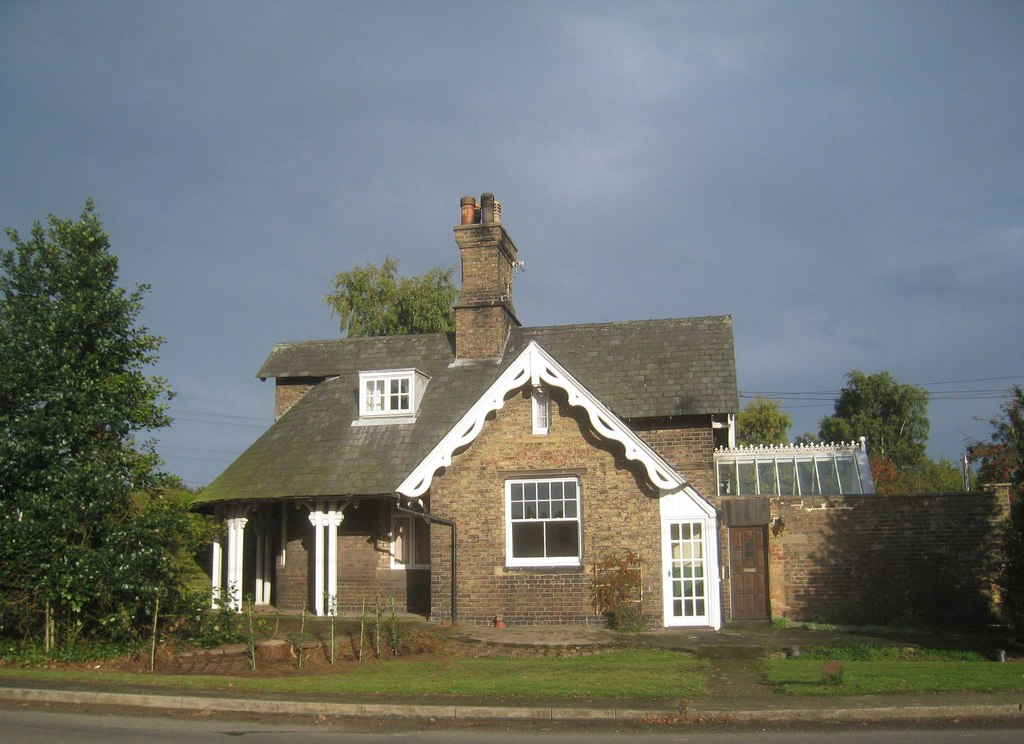
- The site of the station in 2013

General information
- Location: North Kesteven; England
- Coordinates: 53.1878°N 0.6512°W
- Grid reference: SK902664
- Platforms: 2

Other information
- Status: Disused

History
- Original company: Midland Railway
- Pre-grouping: Midland Railway
- Post-grouping: London, Midland and Scottish Railway

Key dates
- 4 August 1846: Opened as Thorpe
- 1 October 1890: Renamed as Thorpe-on-the-Hill
- 7 February 1955: Closed
Location

Thorpe on the Hill railway station was a station serving the village of Thorpe-on-the-Hill, Lincolnshire, England.

== Opening ==
It was opened as Thorpe on 4 August 1846 by the Midland Railway when it opened the Nottingham to Lincoln Line. The station was located 10 miles 26 chains (16.6 km) from Newark Castle and 6 miles 30 chains (10.3 km) from Lincoln Central. (Note: Railways in the United Kingdom are, for historical reasons, measured in miles and chains. A chain is 22 yards (20 m) long, there are 80 chains to the mile.)

The station building was to the south of the two running lines on the east side of Station Road which was crossed by a level crossing, there were two platforms and a small goods yard to the north east able to accommodate most types of goods including live stock.

== Services ==
In 1850 the station was serviced by three stopping trains between Derby and Lincoln (Midland Railway) in each direction on each weekday with two services each way on Sundays.

The station was renamed to Thorpe on the Hill on 1 October 1890.

By 1922 the passenger service had increased slightly and there were six stopping trains in each direction between Nottingham and Lincoln (Midland Railway), with an extra one to Nottingham on Thursdays and Saturdays. There were still two trains each way on Sundays.

In 1947 the London, Midland and Scottish Railway service comprised six services in each direction to either Nottingham or Lincoln with one extra Saturday service through to Derby, there were three Sunday trains to Lincoln but only two back.

Preceding station	Historical railways	Following station
Swinderby	Midland Railway; Newark to Grimsby	Hykeham

== Closure ==
The station closed for passengers on 7 February 1955 and freight on 15 June 1964.

The line through the station site is still open.
