= Collingham railway station =

Railway station in Nottinghamshire, England

Coordinates: 53°08′40″N 0°44′57″W

Collingham
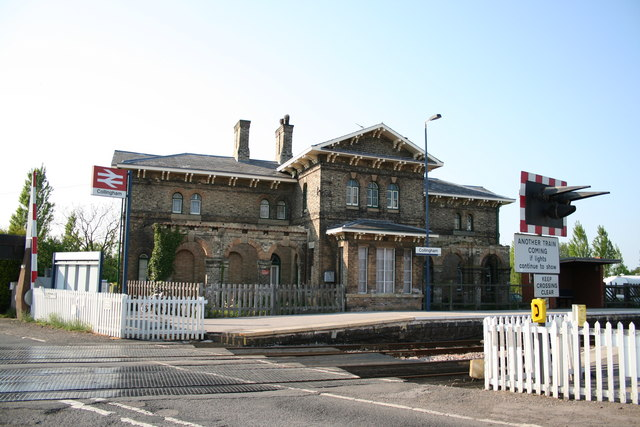

General information
- Location: Collingham, Newark and Sherwood; England
- Grid reference: SK836614
- Managed by: East Midlands Railway
- Platforms: 2

Other information
- Station code: CLM
- Classification: DfT category F2

Key dates
- 3 August 1846: Opened

Passengers
- 2020/21: ▼23,820
- 2021/22: ▲87,440
- 2022/23: ▲108,074
- 2023/24: ▲118,164
- 2024/25: ▲141,448

Listed Building – Grade II
- Feature: Station House
- Designated: 17 October 1984
- Reference no.: 1157045
Location
Notes
- Passenger statistics from the Office of Rail and Road

Collingham railway station is in the village of Collingham, Nottinghamshire, England, on the Nottingham to Lincoln Line. It is owned by Network Rail and managed by East Midlands Railway, which provide all services.

== History ==
It is on the Nottingham to Lincoln Line, which was engineered by George Stephenson and opened by the Midland Railway on 3 August 1846. The contractors for the line were Craven and Son of Newark and Nottingham; The Grade II listed station building in aggressive Italianate style is dated ca. 1848 and is thought to be by the architect I.A. Davies.

On 2 January 1854 a mail train from Nottingham to Lincoln experienced a failure of two wheels under the brake van. The Newark Road crossing keeper saw the guard's red light signal and switched on his danger signal bringing the train to a halt before any serious damage was done. Five days later on 7 January, a train leaving Collingham for Lincoln experienced some fragmentation of some of the engine wheels. Fortunately no injuries were sustained.

On 5 August 1857 an excursion train was proceeding from Carlton to Grimsby. Shortly after passing Collingham a number of the carriages derailed. Some passengers jumped from the carriages, and a young woman 18 years of age, Miss Brewster of Stoke Bardolph, was killed.

On 18 March 1861 George Taylor, an employee of George Johnson coal merchant, was loading a cart with coal. Perceiving that the ass and cart were in danger of being run over by a truck which was being shunted from the main line into the siding, he leaped from the truck and applied the brake. He was then hit by the buffer of a loaded truck and knocked down. The wheel went over his right leg and at the hospital in Newark later that evening, it was amputated.

=== Stationmasters ===
On 6 May 1848, Meynell Huntley, station master, was charged at Nottingham Assizes with embezzling money belonging to the Midland Railway. At the trial in July held before Lord Chief Justice Denman he pleaded guilty to the theft of three cheques with a total value of £30 6s (equivalent to £3,843 in 2023). Despite having a wife and family he was sentenced to 12 years transportation. He was imprisoned in the Hulks at Woolwich until he was transported on the Hashemy which departed England on 19 July 1850 and arrived in Western Australia on 25 October 1850.

- Meynell Huntley until 1848
- George Midwinter 1848 - 1868
- Samuel Theodore Bunning 1868 - 1869 (afterwards station master at Beeston)
- Thomas Grundy ca. 1871 - 1876
- Edward Brown 1876 - 1878
- Frederick J. Bent 1878 - 1880 (afterwards station master at Barton and Walton)
- William Doughty 1880 - 1884
- Charles Larkin 1884 - 1890 (afterwards station master at Bentham)
- Alfred Lee 1890 - 1895
- J.W. Harrison 1895 - 1900
- Arthur Edward Kind 1900 - 1931
- H.A. Collins from 1947 (formerly station master at Bredon)

== Facilities ==
The station is unstaffed and facilities are limited. The station has a shelter on each platform as well modern help points and bicycle storage. The station has no ticket machines and the full range of tickets can be purchased from the guard on board the train.

The station also has a large 58 space car park which opened in May 2014 to help boost passenger numbers at the station.

Step-free access is available to both the platforms at Collingham.

== Services ==
All services at Collingham are operated by East Midlands Railway.

Trains are frequent throughout the day and, according to local media, it is the second most-used station on the Nottingham-Lincoln line, after Newark Castle. In December 2008, the station had its most frequent service ever.

The station is generally served by an hourly service southbound to Matlock via Nottingham and northbound to Lincoln. One train every two hours continues beyond Lincoln to Cleethorpes. The station is also served by five trains per day between Lincoln and Newark Northgate.

The station is also served by two trains per day to and one train per day from London St Pancras International which are operated using a Class 222 Meridian.

A roughly hourly service also serves the station on Sundays. There are no services to London on Sundays.

Preceding station	National Rail	Following station
Newark Castle	East Midlands Railway Newark to Grimsby	Swinderby
Newark Northgate	East Midlands Railway Newark to Grimsby	Swinderby

== See also ==
- Listed buildings in Collingham, Nottinghamshire
