= Morton Hall =

Village in Lincolnshire, England

Coordinates: 53.168°N 0.690°W

- Location within Lincolnshire
- OS grid reference: SK876643
  - London: 115 mi (185 km) S
- Civil parish: Swinderby
- District: North Kesteven
- Shire county: Lincolnshire
- Region: East Midlands
- Country: England
- Sovereign state: United Kingdom
- Post town: LINCOLN
- Postcode district: LN6
- Dialling code: 01522
- Police: Lincolnshire
- Fire: Lincolnshire
- Ambulance: East Midlands
- UK Parliament: Sleaford and North Hykeham

Morton Hall is a small village in the civil parish of Swinderby, in the North Kesteven district of Lincolnshire, England, 8 miles (13 km) south-west of Lincoln, between the larger villages of Swinderby, Thorpe on the Hill and Eagle Barnsdale.

Morton Hall is served by Swinderby railway station, just outside the village to the west. The hamlet of Morton is 0.5 miles (0.8 km) to the south-east.

HM Prison Morton Hall is in the village. It was originally the site of an RAF base, which was converted into a prison in 1985. The facility was converted into an immigration removal centre in 2011.
