= Hykeham =

Hykeham may refer to:

- North Hykeham, a town and civil parish in Lincolnshire, England
- South Hykeham, a village and civil parish in Lincolnshire, England
- Hykeham railway station, a railway station in Lincolnshire, England
