= Hykeham railway station =

Railway station in Lincolnshire, England

Hykeham
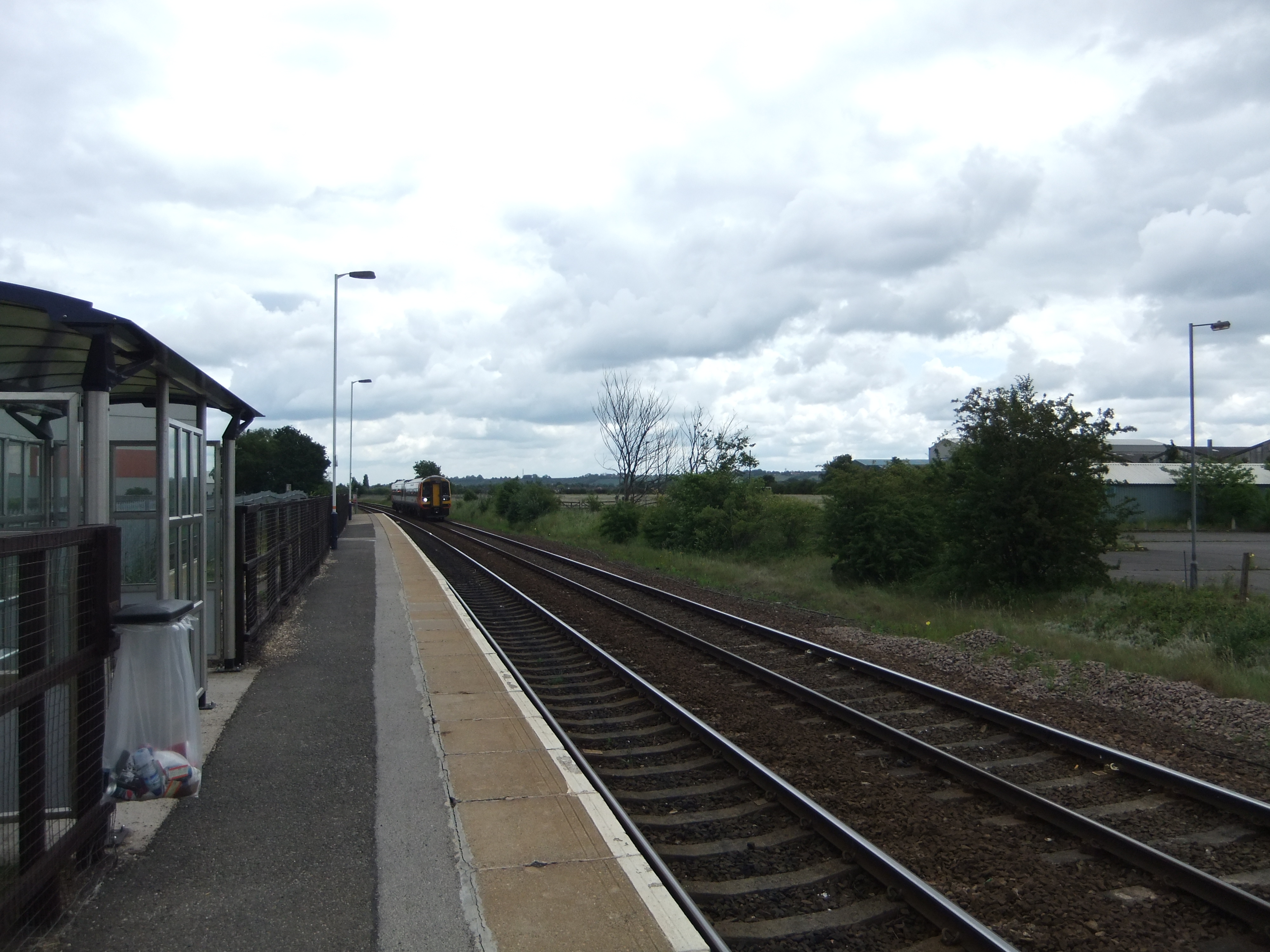

General information
- Location: North Hykeham, North Kesteven; England
- Coordinates: 53.19519°N 0.59985°W
- Grid reference: SK936673
- Manager: East Midlands Railway
- Platforms: 2

Other information
- Station code: HKM
- Classification: DfT category F2

History
- Opened: 3 August 1846

Passengers
- 2020/21: ▼31,522
- 2021/22: ▲0.102 million
- 2022/23: ▲0.113 million
- 2023/24: ▲0.157 million
- 2024/25: ▲0.209 million
Location
Notes
- Passenger statistics from the Office of Rail and Road

Hykeham railway station serves the town of North Hykeham and Lincoln city suburbs of Birchwood and Boultham Moor in Lincolnshire, England. The station is on the Nottingham to Lincoln Central Line. It is owned by Network Rail and managed by East Midlands Railway, which provides all the services.

== History ==
Hykeham station was opened on 4 August 1846 at the same time as the Nottingham to Lincoln Line with train services initially running from Nottingham to Lincoln St Marks.

Diesel multiple units were introduced to provide services at the station in 1958. In the 1980s, services at the station were diverted to run into Lincoln Central with St Marks station being closed.

=== Stationmasters ===
- W.G. Watkins ca. 1860 ca. 1871
- C.O. Brown 1873–1874
- S. Stanley 1874–1880
- James B. Palmer 1880–1886
- John Walters 1886–1888 (afterwards station master at Plumtree)
- E.C. Harvey 1888–1890
- Charles Bateman 1890–1893
- H.E. Wiltshire 1893–1894
- H.W. Bethell 1894–1898
- George Edward Cramp 1898–1903 (afterwards station master at Widmerpool)
- Robert Arthur Gill 1903–1913 (later station master at Harlington)
- George Edwin Stapleton from 1913 (formerly station master at Bleasby)
- J.W. Flint until 1937 (afterwards station master at Sileby)
- J.R. Needham from 1937 (formerly station master at Dunchurch)

== Facilities ==
The station has two platforms, which are staggered over a level crossing and feature basic facilities. The station is unstaffed but has a ticket machine, while help points are available for passenger information.

The station has a small cycle rack as well as a free car park at its entrance. Step-free access is available to both the platforms at the station.

== Services ==
All services at Hykeham are operated by East Midlands Railway.

The station is generally served by an hourly service southbound to Matlock via Nottingham and to Crewe via Nottingham and 2 trains per hour northbound to Lincoln. One train every two hours continues beyond Lincoln to Cleethorpes. The station is also served by five trains per day between Lincoln and Newark North Gate.

The station is also served by two trains per day to and one train per day from London St Pancras International which are operated using a Class 222 Meridian.

A roughly hourly service also serves the station on Sundays although services run only on the Matlock to Lincoln route. There are no services to London on Sundays.

| Preceding station | National Rail | Following station |
|---|---|---|
| Swinderby | East Midlands Railway Grimsby–Lincoln–Newark line | Lincoln |
| Swinderby | East Midlands Railway: Nottingham–Lincoln line; Limited Service | Lincoln |
| | Disused railways | |
| Thorpe-on-the-Hill Line open, station closed | Midland Railway Newark to Grimsby | Lincoln St Marks Line partly open, station closed |

== Bus connections ==
No regular buses directly serve the station although the Stagecoach East Midlands routes 15 and 16 between Lincoln and North Hykeham both stop a short distance away on Newark Road. The PC coaches routes 47, 48 and 49 to Newark-on-Trent, Bassingham and Witham St Hughs also stop near the station.
