= Highbury College, London =

English nonconformist theological college, 1783–1854

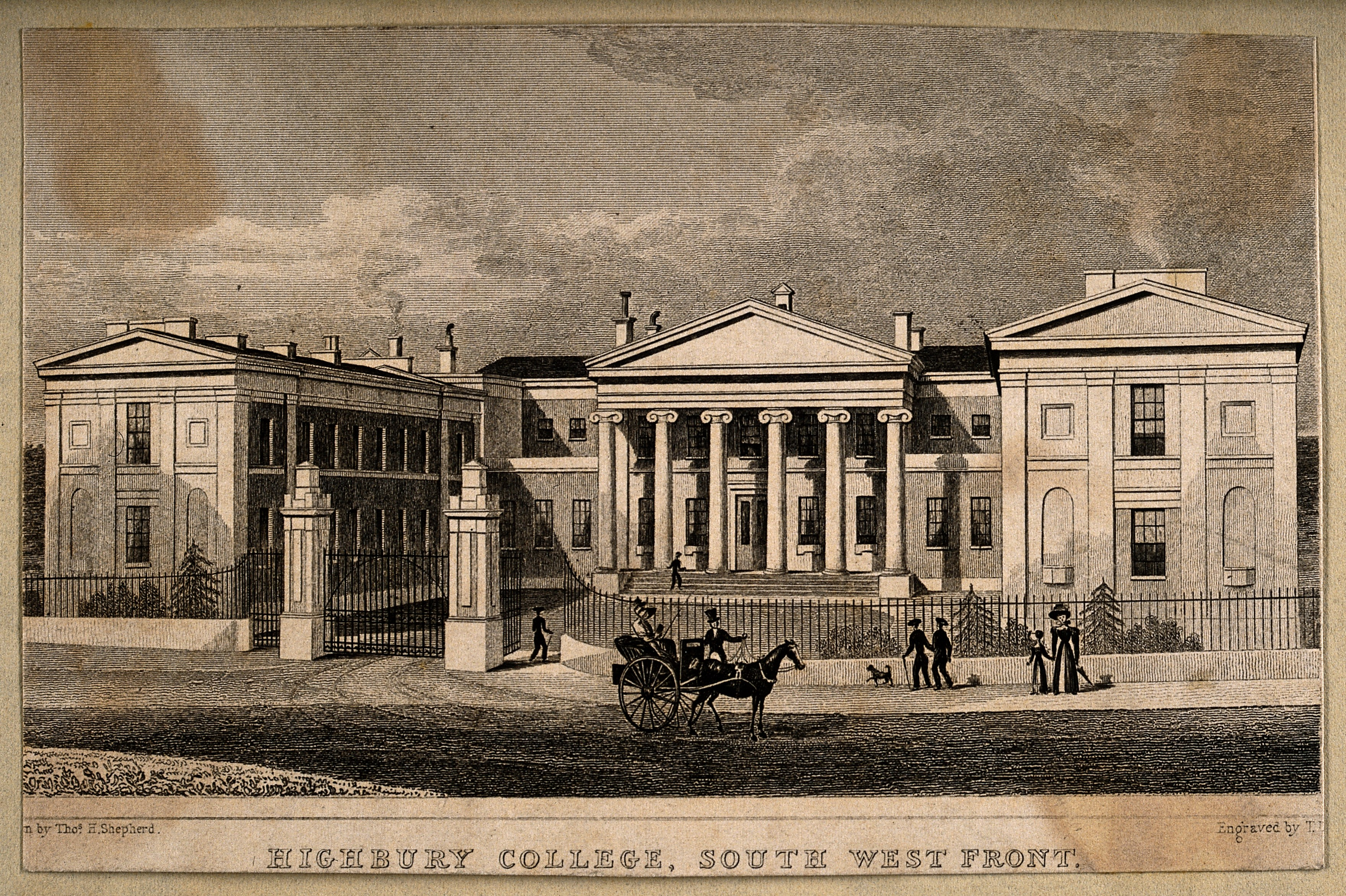
Highbury College: the south-west front (etching, after T. H. Shepherd).

Highbury College was a dissenting academy, that is, a school or college set up by English Dissenters. Its most famous student was Christopher Newman Hall. It had a high reputation, and in time it was amalgamated into New College London.

== History ==
It was set up in Mile End in 1783, moved to Hoxton in 1791, and then to Highbury in 1826. Trustees had acquired about five acres of land, and for £22,000 had commissioned John Davies to build a new college. By 1854, following the amalgamation of Highbury College into New College London, the building had become a teacher training college, and in 1866 it reverted to a theological college, this time for the Church of England

Samuel Lewis in his 1831 A Topographical Dictionary of England describes the students as "single men, eighteen years of age and upwards, producing testimonials of their piety, and being able to translate Virgil, having also some acquaintance with the Greek grammar, fractional arithmetic, and the elements of geography" and the curriculum as "Latin, Greek, Hebrew, Chaldee, and Syriac languages, the belles lettres, intellectual and moral philosophy, the mathematics, history, biblical criticism, the composition of sermons, theology, Hebrew antiquities, &c."

Brown judges it the "largest and most prestigious" of the Dissenting Academies, but still, this meant it had only 40 students in the 1830s.

== Associated people ==
Rev. Dr. Christopher Newman Hall (1816–1902), known in later life as a 'Dissenter's Bishop', was one of the most celebrated nineteenth century English Nonconformist divines. He was active in social causes; supporting Abraham Lincoln and abolition of slavery during the American Civil War, the Chartist cause, and arranging for influential Nonconformists to meet Gladstone. Come to Jesus, first published in 1848 also contributed to his becoming a household name throughout Britain, the US and further afield - by the end of the century the book had been translated into about forty languages and sold four million copies worldwide.
