= Thorpe on the Hill, Lincolnshire =

Village in Lincolnshire, England

Coordinates: 53.179927°N 0.642100°W

Thorpe on the Hill
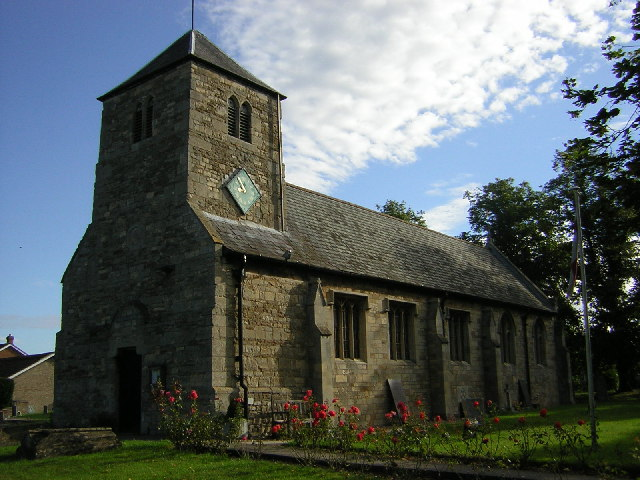
- St Michael's Church, Thorpe on the Hill

- Location within Lincolnshire
- Population: 558 (2011)
- OS grid reference: SK908656
  - London: 125 mi (201 km) S
- District: North Kesteven
- Shire county: Lincolnshire
- Region: East Midlands
- Country: England
- Sovereign state: United Kingdom
- Post town: LINCOLN
- Postcode district: LN6
- Police: Lincolnshire
- Fire: Lincolnshire
- Ambulance: East Midlands
- UK Parliament: Sleaford and North Hykeham

Thorpe on the Hill is a small village and civil parish in North Kesteven, Lincolnshire, England.

== Location ==
It is situated less than 1 mile (1.6 km) north from the A46 road, and 6 miles (10 km) south-west from Lincoln city centre.

== Population ==
In the 2001 census the parish population was 530, increasing to 558 at the 2011 census.

== Industries ==
Local commerce and industry includes the door manufacturer Doortechnik.

== Transportation ==
Thorpe-on-the-Hill railway station, on the Nottingham to Lincoln Line north of the village, was opened in 1846; it closed in 1955.
