= Market Rasen railway station =

Railway station in Lincolnshire, England

Market Rasen
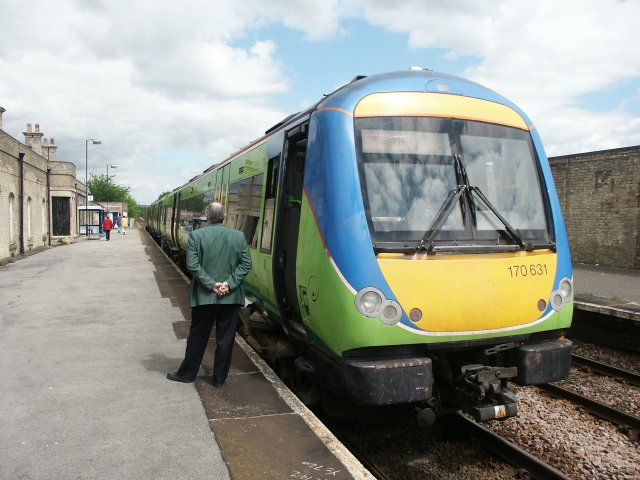
- Market Rasen railway station in 2003

General information
- Location: Market Rasen, West Lindsey; England
- Coordinates: 53.384°N 0.337°W
- Grid reference: TF107887
- Manager: East Midlands Railway
- Platforms: 2

Other information
- Station code: MKR
- Classification: DfT category F1

Passengers
- 2021/22: ▲51,298
- 2022/23: ▲55,980
- 2023/24: ▲57,826
- 2024/25: ▲65,162
- 2025/26: ▲74,078

Listed Building – Grade II
- Feature: Railway Station
- Designated: 16 May 1984
- Reference no.: 1359780
Location
Notes
- Passenger statistics from the Office of Rail and Road

Market Rasen railway station serves the market town of Market Rasen in Lincolnshire, England.

== History ==
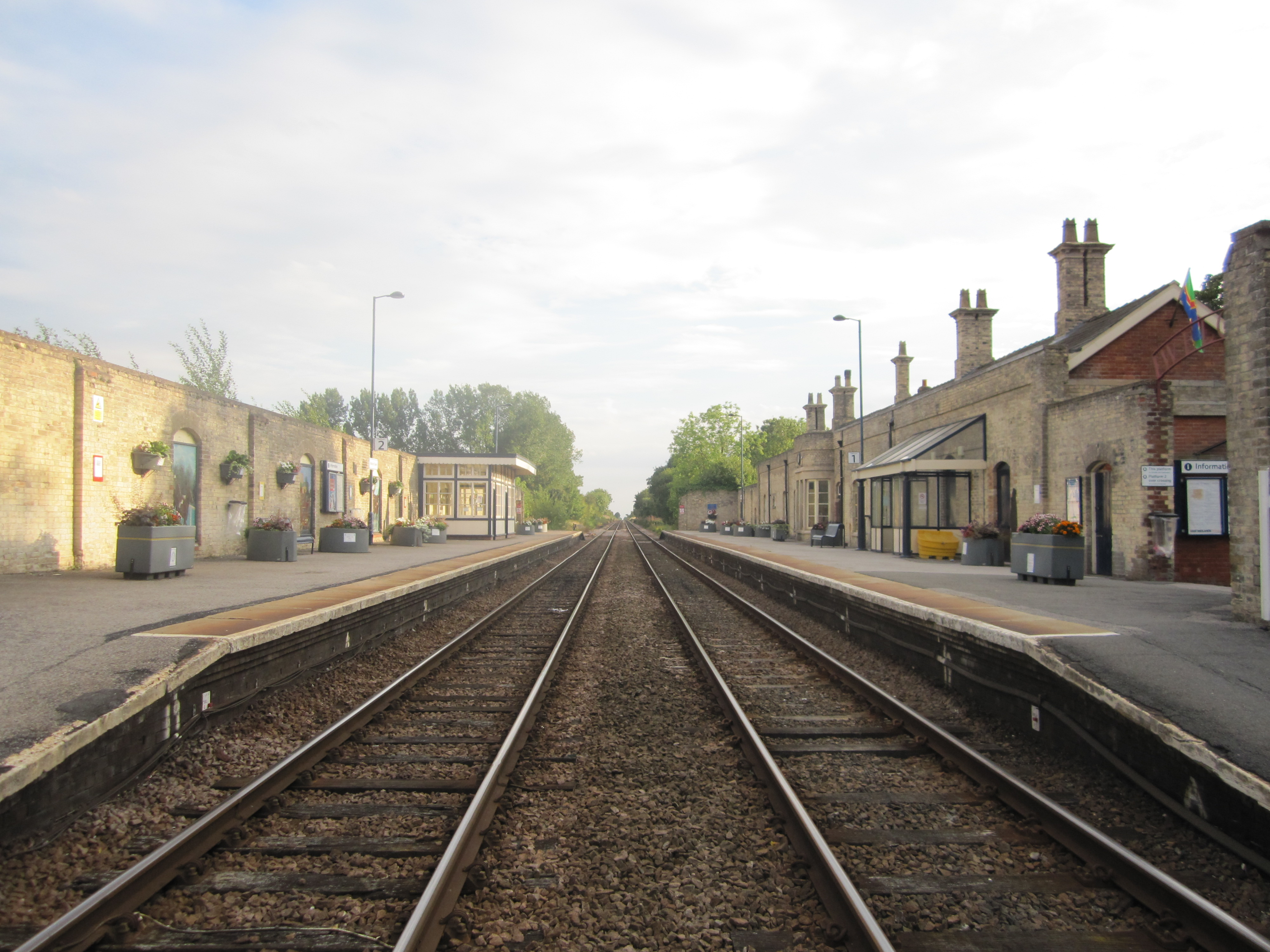
The station in the Up direction. 19 August 2011.

It was built by the Great Grimsby and Sheffield Junction Railway, with the opening of the line, in 1848. The station was a substantial structure with an overall roof below which all the usual station facilities could be found including a W. H. Smith bookstall. The station buildings are Grade II listed.

It is the only station now between Lincoln and Barnetby, but in the past there were many more (these mainly succumbed to the Beeching Axe in 1965). The signal box which was at the south end of the Lincoln platform was removed to Great Central Railway (heritage railway) at Quorn and re-erected in 1987.

Nowadays it is on the "Grimsby - Lincoln - Newark" line and is managed by East Midlands Railway.

== Services ==
All services at Market Rasen are operated by East Midlands Railway.

The typical off-peak service is one train every two hours in each direction between Cleethorpes and Matlock via Lincoln and Nottingham.

On Sundays, the station is served by three trains per day in each direction between Cleethorpes and Matlock.

Preceding station	National Rail	Following station
Lincoln	East Midlands Railway Grimsby–Lincoln–Newark line	Barnetby
Disused railways
Wickenby	Great Central Railway Great Grimsby and Sheffield Junction Railway	Claxby and Usselby
