= Lincoln rail crash =

1962 Railway accident

Details
- Date: 3 June 1962; 00:49
- Location: Lincoln Central railway station, Lincolnshire
- Coordinates: 53.2247°N 0.5347°W
- Country: England
- Line: Doncaster to Lincoln Line
- Cause: Overspeed on curve

Statistics
- Trains: 1
- Deaths: 3
- Injured: 7

The Lincoln rail crash occurred on 3 June 1962, when the 22:15 sleeping car express train from King's Cross to Edinburgh derailed on a sharp curve just a short distance east of Lincoln Central railway station. Two passengers and a sleeping car attendant were killed and seven people were seriously injured.

The train had been diverted from its usual route because of engineering work on the East Coast Main Line. A conductor driver had taken the controls of the locomotive, an English Electric Type 4, because the regular driver did not know the diversionary route.

The conductor driver was not qualified to drive diesel locomotives, but he had done so occasionally before. It was thought that he was used to driving without a speedometer and so had misjudged his speed on the approach to Lincoln, entering a 15 mph curve at around 55 mph. The driver had also evidently been inattentive because the home signal near the curve was not cleared until the train was almost at it, yet it passed the signal at around 60 mph.

Most of the coaches were derailed although the locomotive was not; the latter coming to a stand in the middle of Lincoln Central station.
