= Newark flat crossing =

Flat railway crossing in Nottinghamshire, England

Coordinates: 53.0906°N 0.8049°W

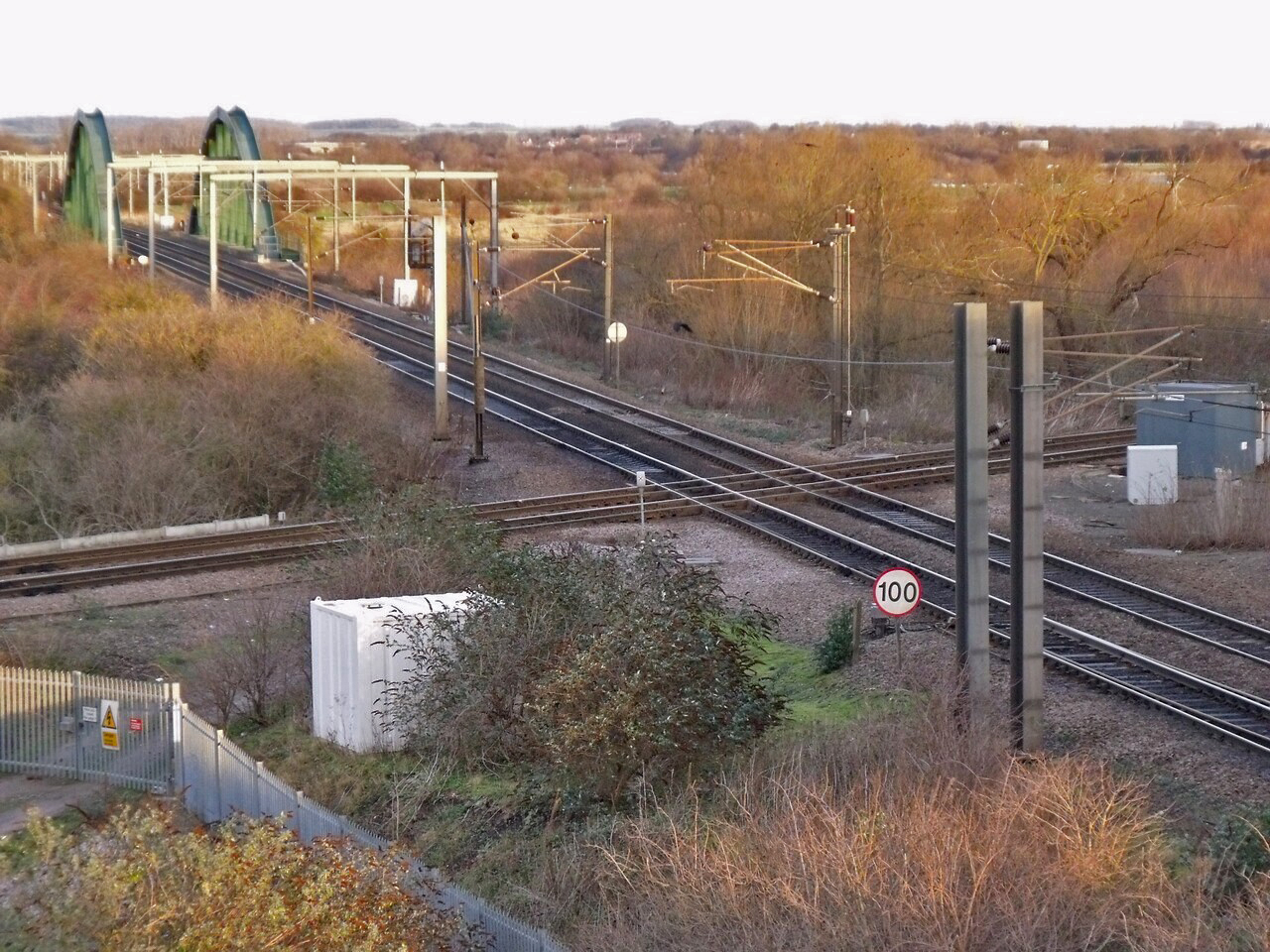
Newark flat crossing

Newark flat crossing is the last remaining flat railway crossing on the Network Rail network in the United Kingdom where two standard gauge lines intersect. It is located to the north of Newark Northgate station. It is the point where the Nottingham to Lincoln Line intersects with the East Coast Main Line.

On 4 October 1852, a Great Northern train collided with a Midland train which was on the crossing. The Great Northern engine No. 204 driven by William Lightfoot heading north struck the third wagon from the end of the Midland train. The three wagons of the Midland train left the line and ended up in water at the bottom of the embankment. Three passenger coaches from the Great Northern train were also derailed and several passengers were injured. The guard of the Midland train was severely injured and taken to the Lion and Adder Public House in Newark for surgical treatment.

There have been numerous proposals to replace it with a grade separation, none of which have been implemented. A geographical constraint is the proximity of the site to the River Trent which is crossed by a bridge immediately to the north of the junction. The RUS recommended that the provision of a flyover at Newark was further developed in Control Period 4 (2009–2014) to refine the infrastructure costs and potential benefits, with the possibility of constructing it in Control Period 5 (2014–2019).

It is renewed about every 16 years, most recently in May 1986, August 2003 and August 2019. During the August 2019 renewal the wooden bearers were replaced with Fiber Form Urethane (FFU) which is expected to have a 30-40 year working life.
