= Newark Castle railway station =

Grade II listed railway station in Nottinghamshire, England

Coordinates: 53°04′50″N 0°48′48″W

Newark Castle
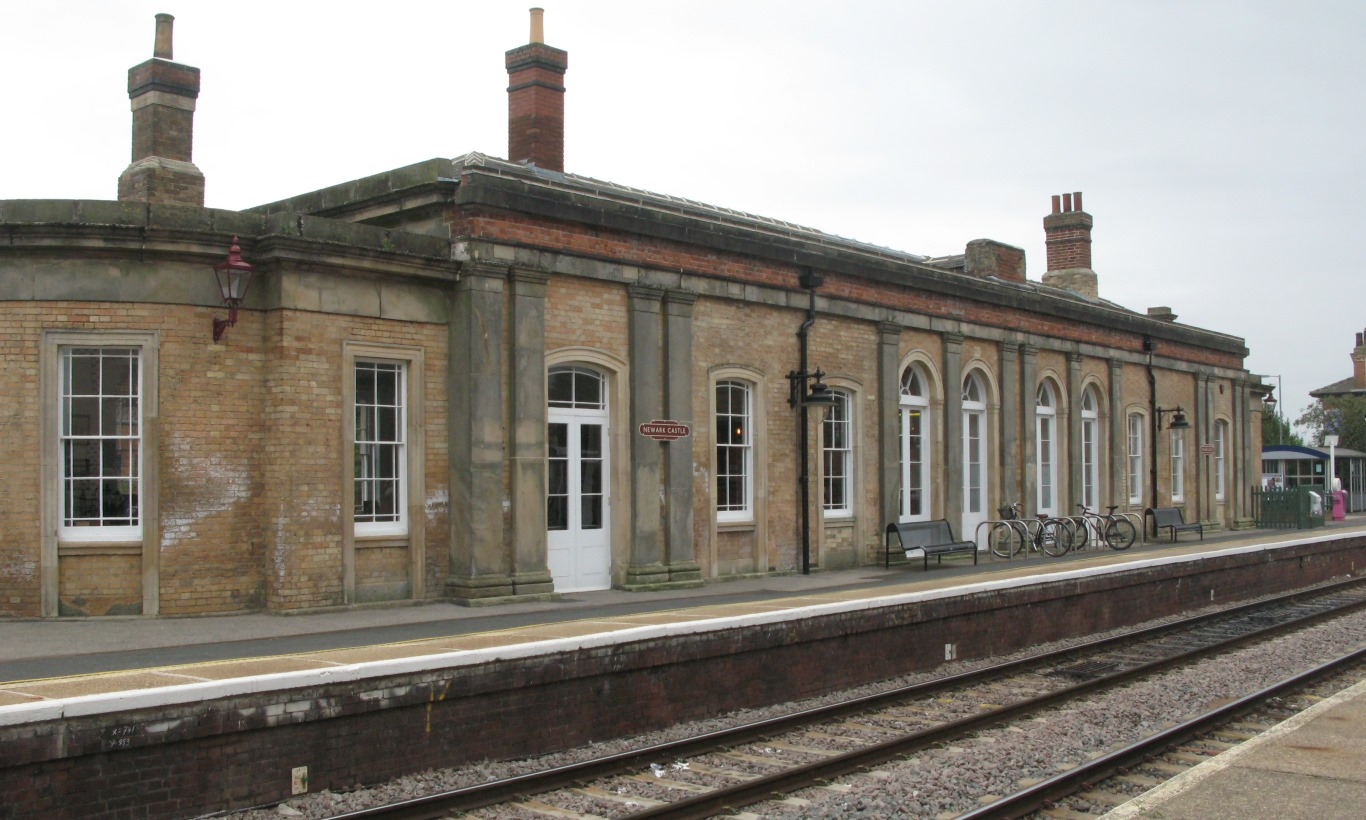
- The station building on platform 1

General information
- Location: Newark-on-Trent, Newark and Sherwood, England
- Grid reference: SK795543
- Managed by: East Midlands Railway
- Platforms: 2

Other information
- Station code: NCT
- Classification: DfT category F1

History
- Opened: 3 August 1846

Passengers
- 2020/21: ▼0.151 million
- Interchange: ▼8,650
- 2021/22: ▲0.563 million
- Interchange: ▲30,312
- 2022/23: ▼0.508 million
- Interchange: ▲66,916
- 2023/24: ▲0.549 million
- Interchange: ▲73,945
- 2024/25: ▲0.619 million
- Interchange: ▼33,213

Listed Building – Grade II
- Feature: Castle railway station, Great North Road
- Designated: 19 May 1971
- Reference no.: 1228701
Location
Notes
- Passenger statistics from the Office of Rail and Road

Newark Castle is one of two railway stations that serve the town of Newark-on-Trent, in Nottinghamshire, England; the other is Newark Northgate on the East Coast Main Line. It lies on the Nottingham to Lincoln Line; it is owned by Network Rail and managed by East Midlands Railway, which provides all services.

== History ==
The station was built in 1846 for the Midland Railway in the Italianate style. The building is now Grade II listed.

Its name is derived from the nearby Newark Castle.

== Facilities ==
The station has a ticket office on platform 1 which is staffed throughout the day, Monday-Saturday. At other times, tickets can be purchased from the self-service ticket machine. It has a shelter on each platform, as well as modern help points for when the station is unstaffed.

It also has a large bicycle storage facility, located next to the Nottingham-bound platform, with an 80 space car park at its entrance.

Step-free access is available to both the platforms at Newark Castle.

A new ticket office, waiting room and toilet facilities opened at the station in autumn 2015.

== Services ==
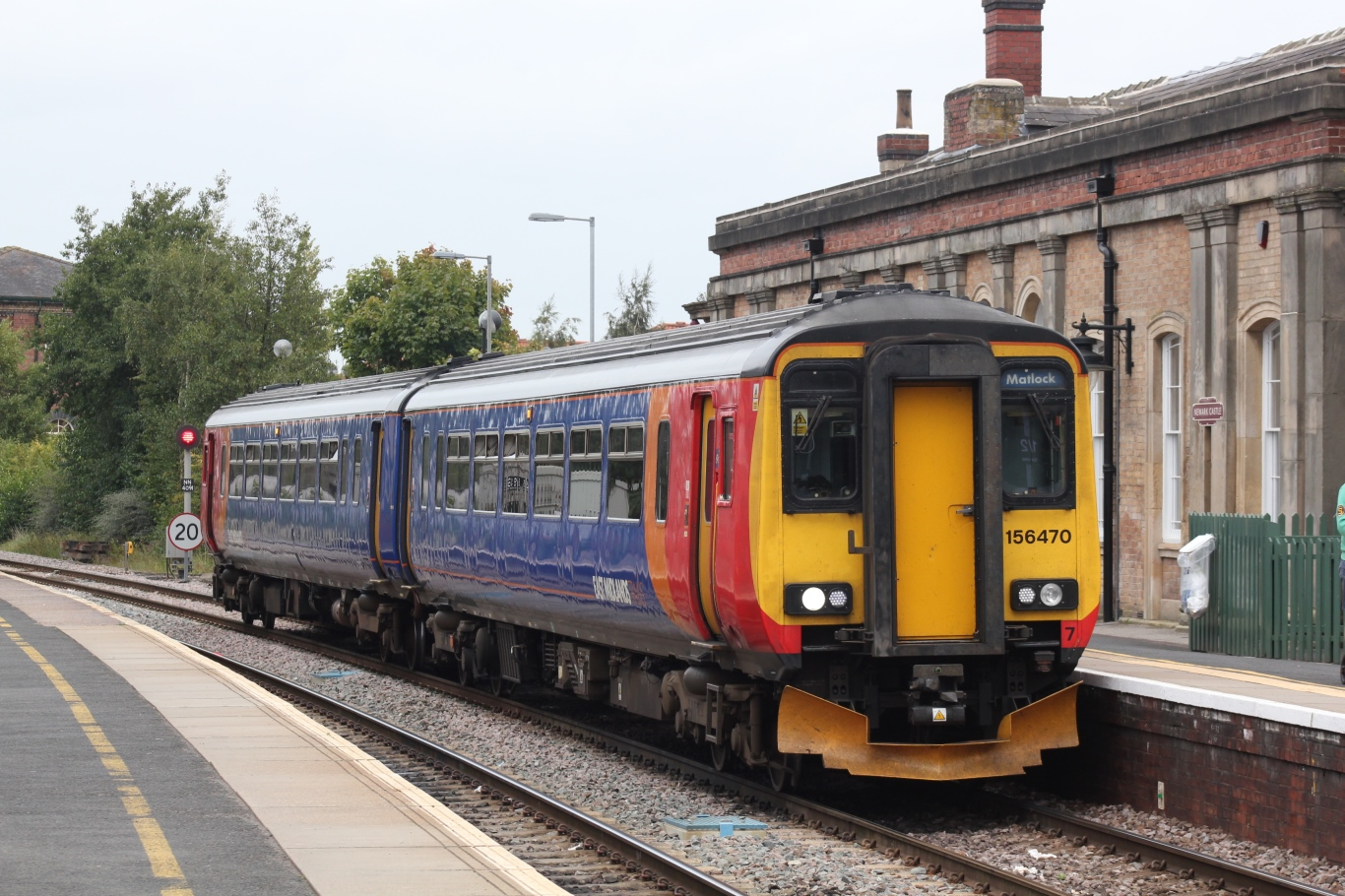
A Class 156 diesel multiple unit on a service bound for Matlock

East Midlands Railway operates all services at Newark Castle; the typical off-peak service in trains per hour / day (tph/tpd) is:

- 1 tph to Matlock, via Nottingham
- 1 tph to Crewe, via Nottingham and Derby
- 2 tph to Lincoln; of which:
  - 1 tp2h continues to Cleethorpes
- 2 tpd to London St Pancras (except Sundays).

On Sundays, there is an approximately hourly service between Lincoln and Matlock from mid-morning onwards.

All regional services are operated using Class 158 and predominantly Class 170 diesel multiple units; inter-city services to London use Class 222 Meridians.

Preceding station	National Rail	Following station
Rolleston	East Midlands Railway Newark to Lincoln	Collingham
Nottingham	East Midlands Railway Newark to Lincoln	Collingham
Lowdham	East Midlands Railway Midland Main Line; Limited service	Collingham

== See also ==
- Listed buildings in Newark-on-Trent
