= John Davies (architect) =

British architect (1796–1865)

Davies, John
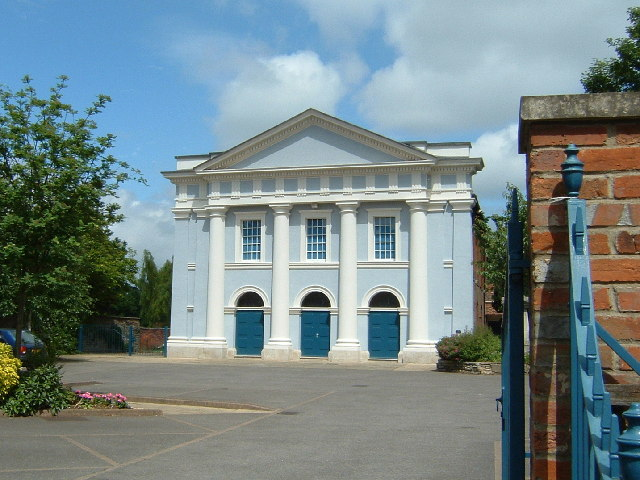
- Abingdon Baptist Church
- Born: 1796
- Died: 30 April 1865 (aged 69); Grove Hill, Woodford, Essex
- Education: Pupil of George Maddox
- Occupation: Architect

John Davies (1796–1865) was an architect who trained in London under George Maddox, an architect who specialised in classical buildings. Davies began to exhibit at the Royal Academy in 1819 and travelled to Italy in 1820–21. He appears to have been a competent artist and Luigi Rossini engraved a drawing by him of the Temples of Paestum. He was a Fellow of the Royal Institute of British Architects. He served as District Surveyor to Tower Hamlets from 1839 until his death in 1865.

Most of the buildings he designed were in Greek revival style, but as so many of them have been demolished, it is difficult to assess the quality of his work. Noticeably, he had a number of commissions for Congregational Chapels and he was the architect for Highbury College for Dissenters in Islington. He had an interest in early railway architecture and construction, subscribing to S C Brees's Railway Practice. A Collection of Working Plan and Practical details of Construction and he may have been the architect responsible for Lincoln St Mark's railway station, with its impressive classical facade and portico with Doric Order columns.

== Architectural works ==
=== Chapels ===
- 1829. Northampton, The Commercial Street Congregational Chapel
- 1828–29. Ipswich St Nicholas Street, Congregational Chapel. (attributed).
- 1830 Richmond, Surrey, The Congregational Chapel.
- 1830 Finchley, Congregational Chapel. (attributed).
- 1841 Abingdon Ock Street Baptist Chapel
- 1843 Camden Town Park Congregational Chapel, Arlington Road

=== Private dwellings ===
- 1851-53 London, 29 Martin Lane. The Old Rectory

=== Schools and colleges ===
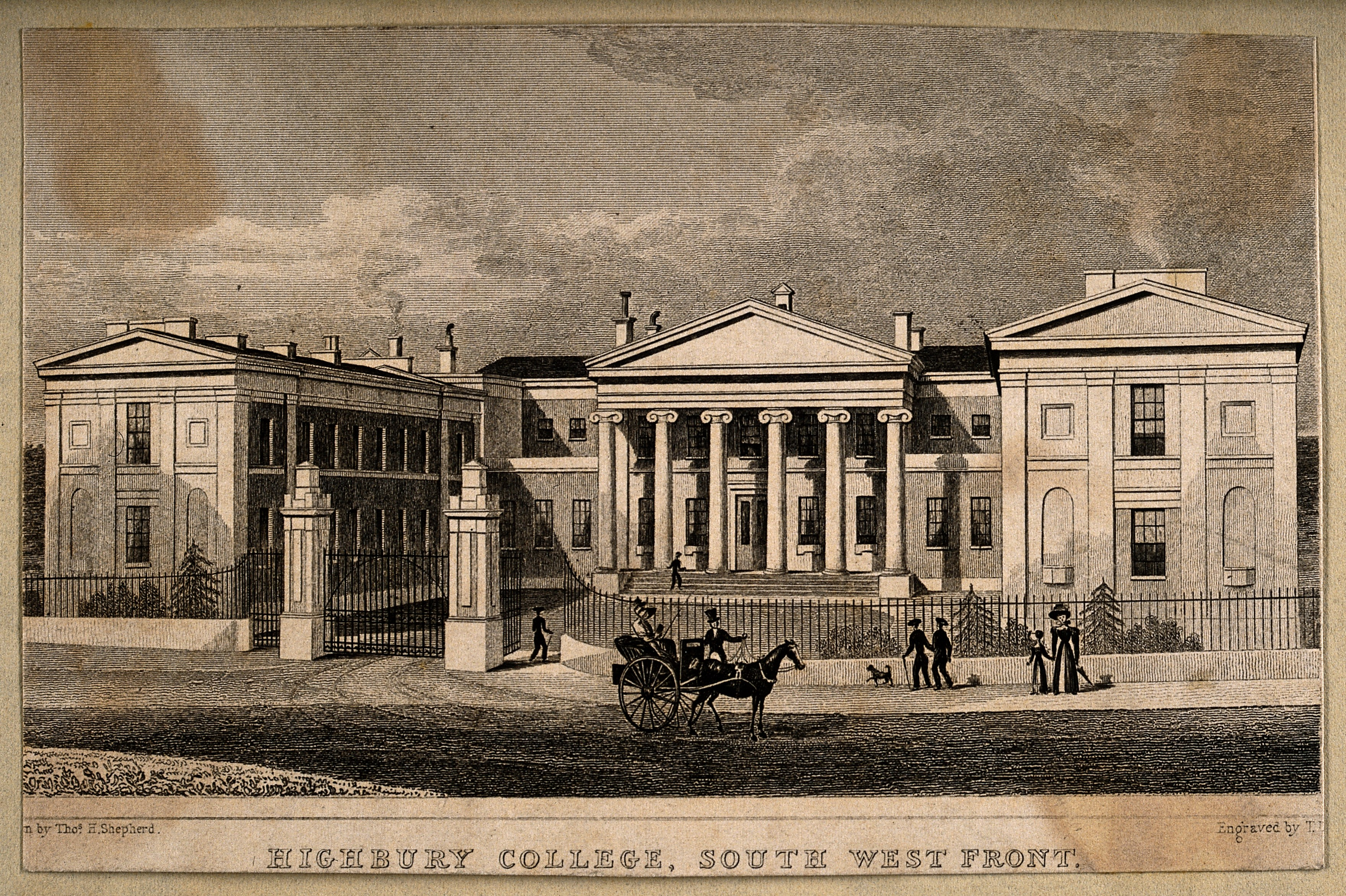
Highbury College, London. Etching by T. Dale, 1827, after T. Wellcome

1825–26. Islington, Highbury College for Dissenters, Now demolished. 1833. Lambeth. Stockwell Grammar School. Tudor Gothic.

=== Banks and commercial premises ===
- 1836 London, St Swithins Lane. Offices for Salomon Mayer von Rothschild.
- 1837 London. Cornhill Marine insurance Office

=== Synagogue ===
- New Synagogue, Great St. Helens, Bishopgate

== Literature ==
- Antonia Brodie (ed), Directory of British Architects, 1834–1914: 2 Vols, British Architectural Library, Royal Institute of British Architects, 2001, Vol 1, p. 505.
- Colvin H. A (1995), Biographical Dictionary of British Architects 1600-1840. Yale University Press, 3rd edition London, pp. 294–95.
