= Lincoln St Marks railway station =

Former railway station in Lincolnshire, England

Lincoln St. Marks
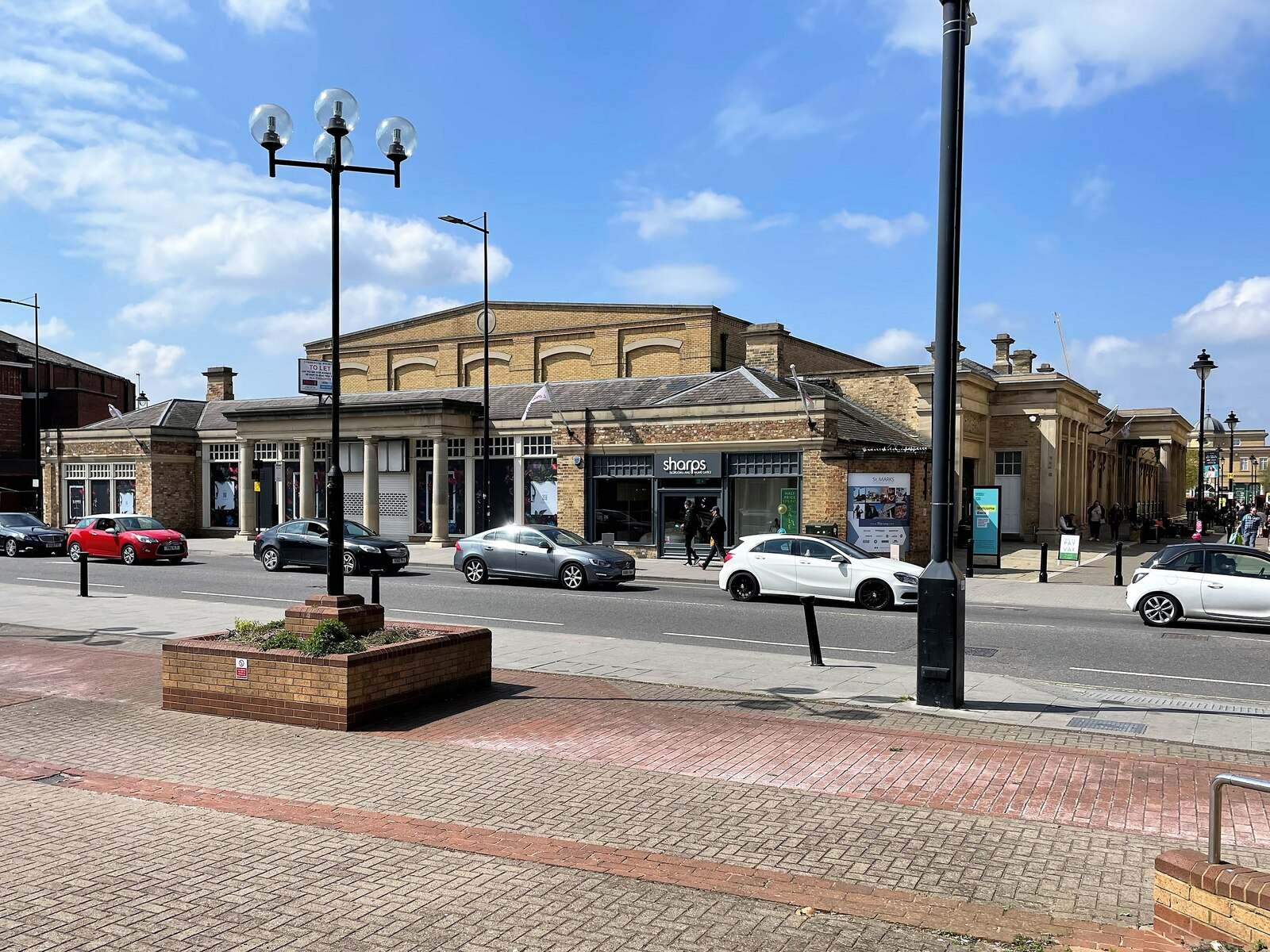
- A view of the former station

General information
- Location: Lincoln, Lincolnshire; England
- Coordinates: 53.22445°N 0.54404°W
- Grid reference: SK973707
- Platforms: 2

Other information
- Status: Disused

History
- Original company: Midland Railway
- Post-grouping: LMSR; Eastern Region of British Railways

Key dates
- 4 August 1846: Opened as Lincoln by the Midland Railway
- 29 September 1950: Renamed Lincoln St. Marks
- 11 May 1985: Closed
Location

Lincoln St. Marks was a railway station on the Nottingham to Lincoln Line that served Lincoln in Lincolnshire, England.

== History ==
St. Mark's railway station, the first in Lincoln, was opened by the Midland Railway in 1846. It was originally a terminus; the line was extended through the station only a few years after it opened, to connect with the Great Northern Railway just to the east of that company's Lincoln Central station. The Durham Ox Junction was also crossed by a road, leading to many delays. The junction was crossed by Pelham Bridge in the mid-1950s. Until its closure, St. Marks was the main line station, with through services from Cleethorpes to London King's Cross. Prior to closure of the Lincoln-to-Grantham line during the Beeching Axe, London services had used Lincoln Central.

To avoid unnecessarily operating two stations, St Marks closed in 1985; services were diverted to the nearby Lincoln Central. The construction of a new 80-metre length of track to the west allowed services from Newark Castle to reach Lincoln Central.

== The site today ==
The grand ionic portico, that was once the entrance, has been preserved; as of January 2007, it was home to Lakeland as part of the commercial development of the site. A mock signalbox has also been erected in the car park, on which has been affixed an original sign from the station. The remainder of the former station site is now St. Marks Shopping Centre. The redevelopment, in keeping with the preserved buildings, won an Ian Allan Heritage Award in 2009, which is commemorated by a plaque.

== Stationmasters ==
From 1934 the position of station master was merged with that of the LNER station and E.O. Wright assumed responsibility.

- Joseph Hawkins ca. 1849 - 1870 (afterwards station master at Burton)
- Thomas Warwick 1870 - 1876 (formerly station master at Keighley)
- Joseph Somers 1876 - 1896
- William H. Buxton 1896 - 1919 (formerly station master at Belper)
- Amos Follows 1919 - 1927 (afterwards station master at Nottingham)
- William Hardy 1927 - 1930 (formerly station master at Gloucester, afterwards station master at Bradford Forster Square)
- W. Lowis 1930 - 1932 (afterwards station master at Leicester)
- Frederick James Stallard 1932 - 1934 (formerly station master at Evesham, afterwards station master at Low Moor, Bradford)

Preceding station	Disused railways	Following station
Hykeham; Line and station open	Midland Railway; Nottingham to Lincoln Line	Terminus
Terminus	Great Central Railway	Reepham; Line open, station closed
