= Nottingham–Lincoln line =

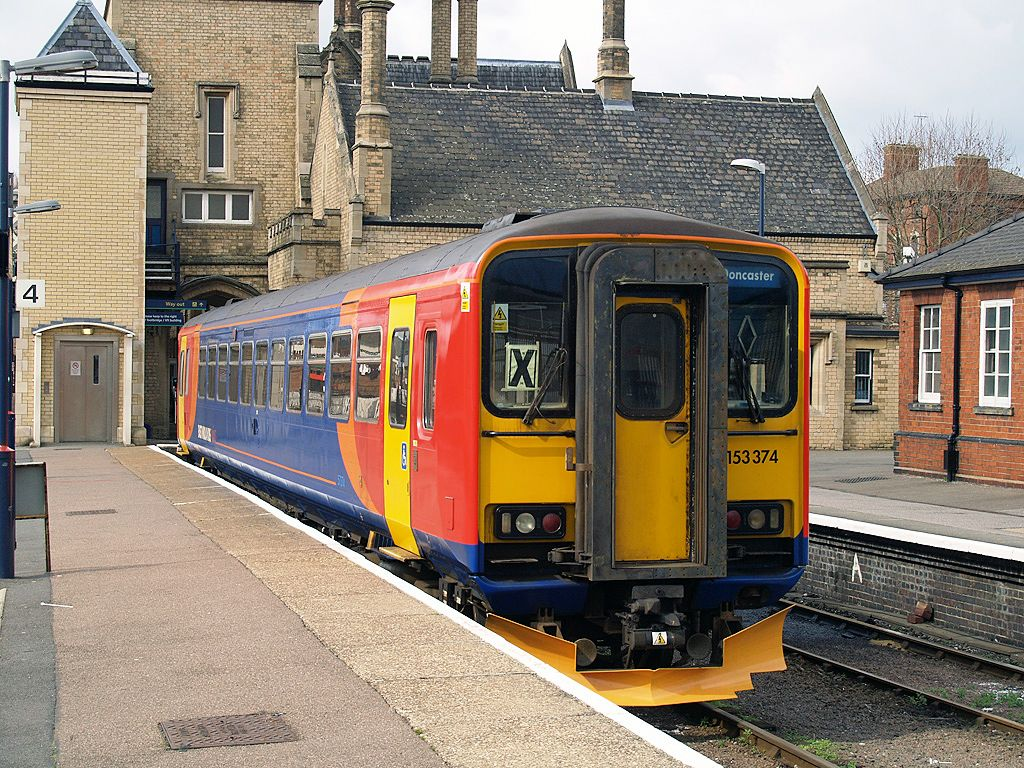
- An East Midlands Trains Class 153 at Lincoln

Overview
- Status: Operational
- Owner: Network Rail
- Locale: Lincolnshire; Nottinghamshire; Leicestershire; East Midlands
- Termini: Nottingham 52.9471°N 1.1467°W; Lincoln 53.2263°N 0.5398°W
- Stations: 13

Service
- Type: Heavy rail
- System: National Rail
- Operator(s): East Midlands Railway; London North Eastern Railway
- Rolling stock: Class 170 "Turbostar"; Class 158 "Express Sprinter"; Class 222 "Meridian"; Class 800 "Azuma"

History
- Opened: 4 August 1846

Technical
- Number of tracks: Two
- Track gauge: 4 ft 8 1/2 in (1,435 mm)
- Operating speed: 70 mph (100 km/h) maximum
Route map
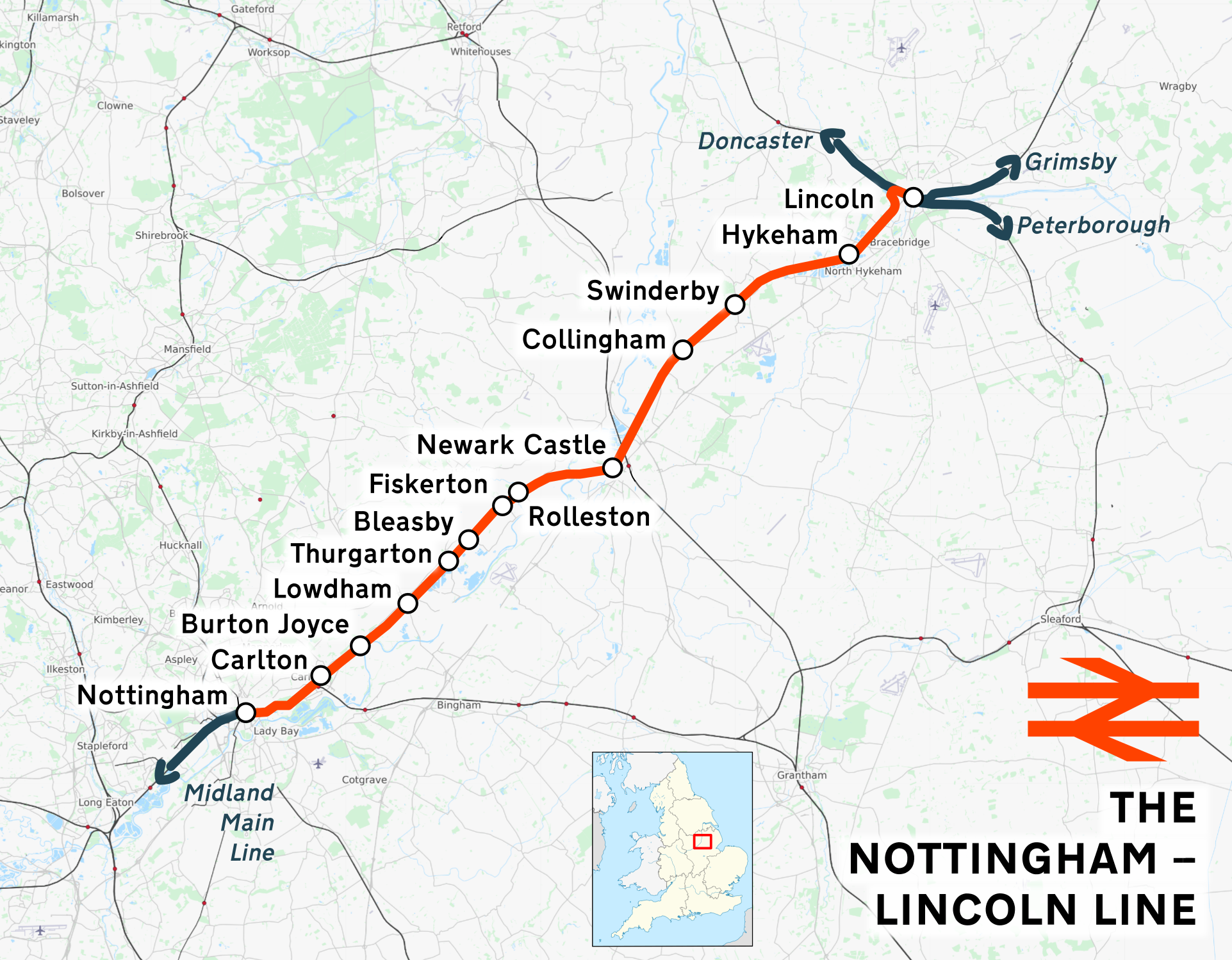
(Click to expand)

The Nottingham–Lincoln line (marketed as the Castle line) is a railway line in central England, running north-east from Nottingham to Lincoln.

== History ==
The Nottingham to Lincoln line was built by the Midland Railway and engineered by Robert Stephenson. The contractors for the line were Craven and Son of Newark and Nottingham who also built many of the stations. Lincoln railway station was built by the contractor Mr. Burton of Lincoln. The line was inspected by General Pasley on 31 July 1846 and opened on 4 August 1846.

Originally the line ended at Lincoln Midland station (later renamed St. Marks) which was built as a terminus. The line was later extended to a junction just east of Lincoln Central railway station (the former Great Northern station), enabling through running from Nottingham to the South Humber ports and Cleethorpes. This extension led to over a hundred years of pedestrian and driver frustration in central Lincoln because there were two mainline level crossings on the High Street within 350 metres, resulting in congestion and traffic chaos. Lincoln St. Marks station was closed (along with its High Street crossing) in the mid-1980s when a diversionary curve was laid to allow services from Nottingham to enter Lincoln Central. The old station building is now part of a shopping centre and houses Lakeland.

Most passenger trains were taken over by diesel units from 14 April 1958, taking about an hour between the two cities.

=== Incidents ===
Due to fog, 14 cows were killed, at Staythorpe, when hit by a three-carriage train, on the evening of Sunday 16 October 1977. There were 40 passengers.

== Current operations ==
Passenger services on the line are provided by East Midlands Railway, using a mix of mainly Class 156 diesel multiple units, Class 158 diesel multiple units, and pairs of Class 153 diesel multiple units. At certain times Class 156 and Class 153 trains run coupled together. Many trains on this route continue southward from Nottingham to Leicester via the Midland Main Line. Some trains call at Newark Northgate (this is generally the first two and last two trains of the day) by running down the spur at the side of the East Coast Main Line and then reversing back again. Many trains also run between Newark North Gate and Lincoln throughout the day, usually timed to provide connections to London King's Cross and other stations on the East Coast Main Line. Every other hour this service continues to Grimsby from Lincoln, with the first and last trains of the day continuing to Cleethorpes. Summer Sundays see a scheduled Newark NG–Lincoln–Cleethorpes service. As of August 2019, London North Eastern Railway runs one train a day in each direction from London to Lincoln.

The line between Newark and Lincoln is currently only cleared for 50–70-mile-per-hour (80–100 km/h) speeds. Nottinghamshire County Council has paid for a study into 90-mile-per-hour (140 km/h) running.

The line serves the following places.

- Nottingham
- Carlton
- Burton Joyce
- Lowdham
- Thurgarton
- Bleasby
- Fiskerton
- Rolleston
- Newark
- Collingham
- Swinderby
- Hykeham
- Lincoln

== Service ==
The timetable has been improved on the line since 2015, with additional trains introduced between Newark Castle and Nottingham in addition to the primary Nottingham to Lincoln ones. The Sunday service on the line has also been increased since the May 2017 timetable change, with the former afternoon-only timetable improved to an hourly frequency each way starting from mid-morning and the intermediate stations served at least every two hours.

One train daily on a Monday to Saturday runs along the line from Lincoln to London St Pancras in the morning, and from London St Pancras back to Lincoln in the evening. It only calls at the busier stations along the line, namely Collingham, Newark Castle, Lowdham (evening journey only) and Nottingham. The train travels along the Midland Main Line for the Nottingham–London portion of the journey. There is also a few trains a day in each direction run by London North Eastern Railway from Lincoln to London King's Cross which leaves/joins the Nottingham to Lincoln line at the Newark flat crossing with the ECML just north of Newark North Gate station.
