= Newark Northgate railway station =

Railway station in Nottinghamshire, England

Newark Northgate
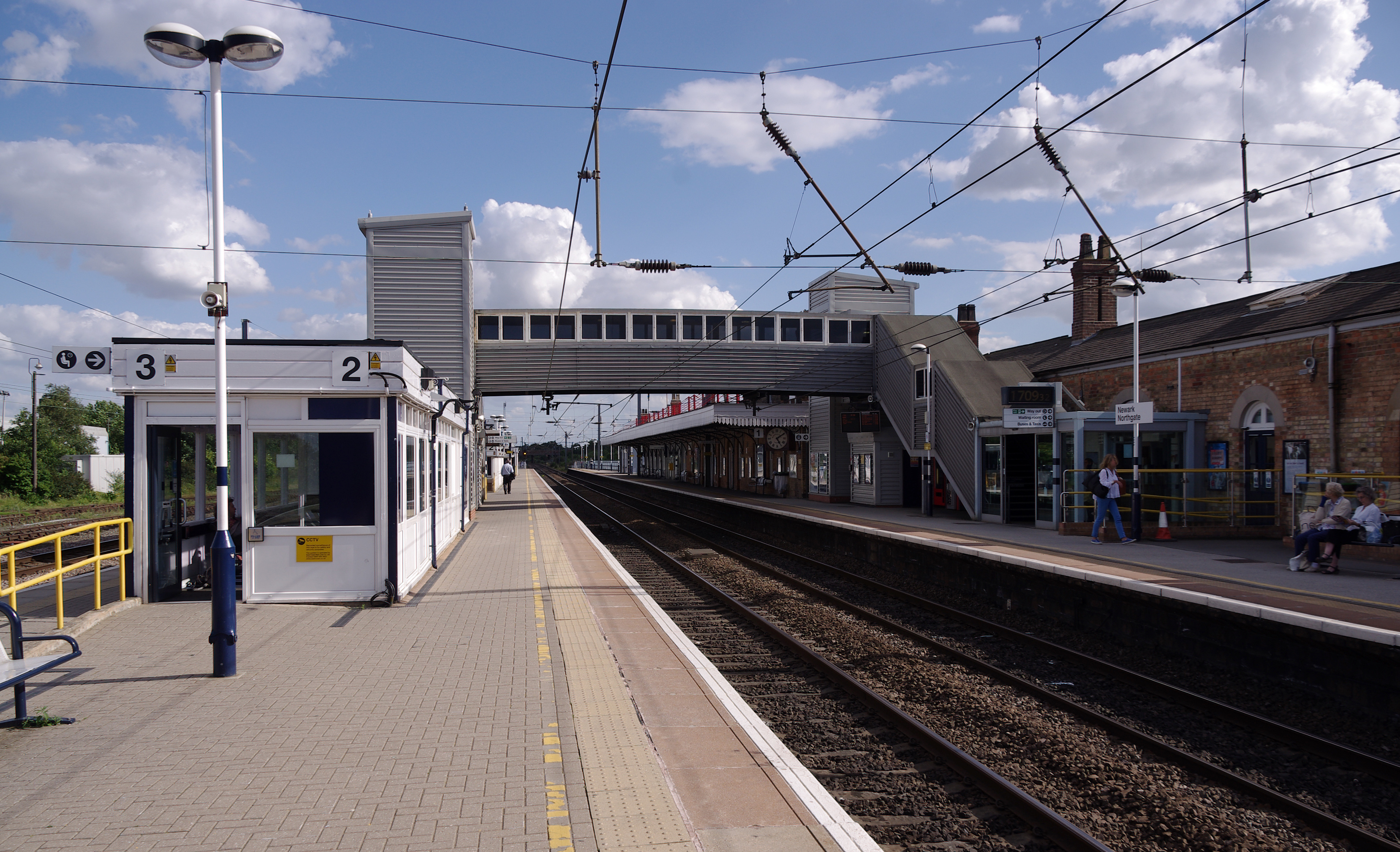
- Southbound view of the station from platform 2 (July 2012)

General information
- Location: Newark-on-Trent, Newark and Sherwood, England
- Coordinates: 53.081°N 0.799°W
- Grid reference: SK804545
- Owner: Network Rail
- Manager: London North Eastern Railway
- Platforms: 3

Other information
- Station code: NNG
- Classification: DfT category C1

History
- Opened: 15 July 1852

Passengers
- 2020/21: ▼0.181 million
- Interchange: ▼40,159
- 2021/22: ▲0.674 million
- Interchange: ▲0.161 million
- 2022/23: ▲0.886 million
- Interchange: ▼0.153 million
- 2023/24: ▲0.957 million
- Interchange: ▲0.177 million
- 2024/25: ▲1.079 million
- Interchange: ▼0.142 million

Listed Building – Grade II
- Feature: Northgate railway station, Appletongate
- Designated: 20 May 1988
- Reference no.: 1196065
Location
Notes
- Passenger statistics from the Office of Rail and Road

Newark Northgate (alternatively Newark North Gate) is one of two railway stations serving the market town of Newark-on-Trent, in Nottinghamshire, England; the other is Newark Castle, sited closer to the town centre. It is a stop on the East Coast Main Line, 120 miles 8 chains (193.3 km) down the line from London King's Cross; it is situated on the main line between Grantham to the south and Retford to the north. The station is Grade II listed.

== History ==
The station is on the Great Northern Railway Towns Line from Peterborough to Doncaster, which opened on 15 July 1852. The Fens Loop Line via Boston and Lincoln had opened two years earlier, as it had been easier to construct.

The station opened without any ceremony. The first train of passengers from the north arrived at 06:38 and those from the south arrived at 08:05. The buildings comprised a booking office, cloakroom, first and second class ladies’ and other waiting rooms, with a large refreshment room 51 feet (16 m) by 21 feet (6.4 m) and a smaller one 21 feet (6.4 m) by 14 feet (4.3 m). The platforms were 435 feet (133 m) long, with awnings provided for 50 feet (15 m) of their length. There was a coal depot, goods warehouse and sheds to accommodate four locomotives.

The station became a junction in 1879, with the opening of the Great Northern Railway branch to Bottesford South, built as a northern extension of the Great Northern and London and North Western Joint Railway which opened at the same time. Services from Newark were provided to Northampton or Leicester Belgrave Road and also to Nottingham Victoria. Services onto the joint line from Newark were withdrawn by 1922. The line was much used for through goods, especially between Newark and Northampton. The joint line closed in 1962, except for isolated fragments, but the Newark to Bottesford Junction section survived until 1988.

On 9 July 1928, King George V and Queen Mary arrived at the station from King's Cross, where they were received by the 6th Duke of Portland.

The short connection to the Newark Castle to Lincoln St. Marks line was opened in 1965 by British Rail to maintain a link between the East Coast Main Line (ECML) and Lincoln, following the closure of the branch from the latter to Grantham. This remains in use today by trains to Lincoln and Grimsby.

The station won the Medium Station of the Year award at the National Rail Awards in 2026.

=== Newark flat crossing ===
The station lies just south of the Newark flat crossing, which is one of the few remaining flat railway crossings in Great Britain. The ECML is crossed by the Nottingham-Lincoln line; inter-city trains not calling at Newark Northgate have to slow from 125 miles per hour (201 km/h) to 100 miles per hour (160 km/h) at the crossing.

== Facilities ==
The station has a ticket office, waiting rooms, a refreshment kiosk, a car park and bike storage. There are lifts and step-free access to all platforms.

== Layout ==
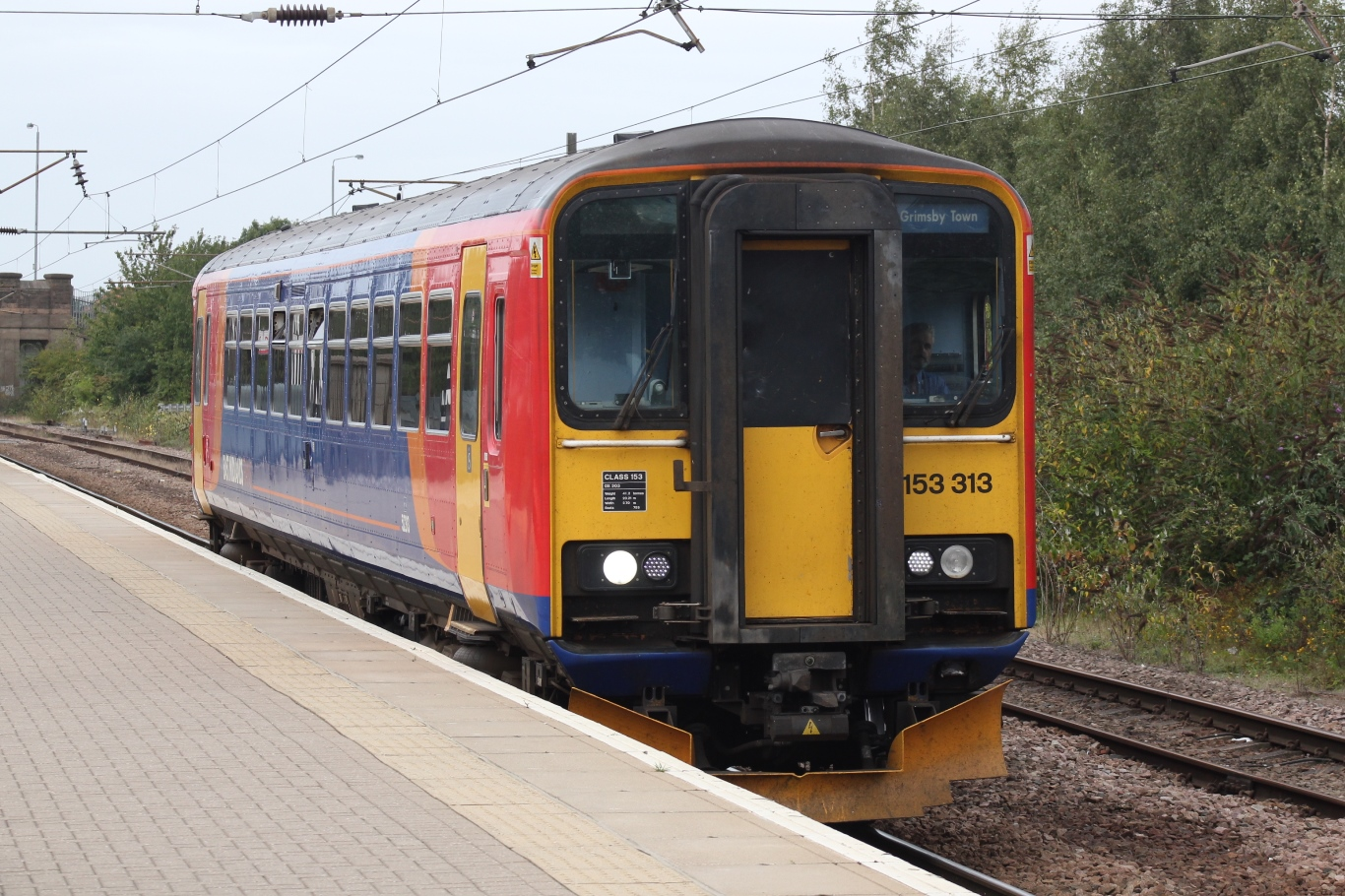
An EMR Regional service bound for Grimsby

The station has three platforms:

1. serves inter-city trains to Doncaster, York, Leeds, Hull Paragon, Newcastle and Edinburgh Waverley
2. to Peterborough and London King's Cross
3. to Lincoln and London King's Cross.

== Services ==
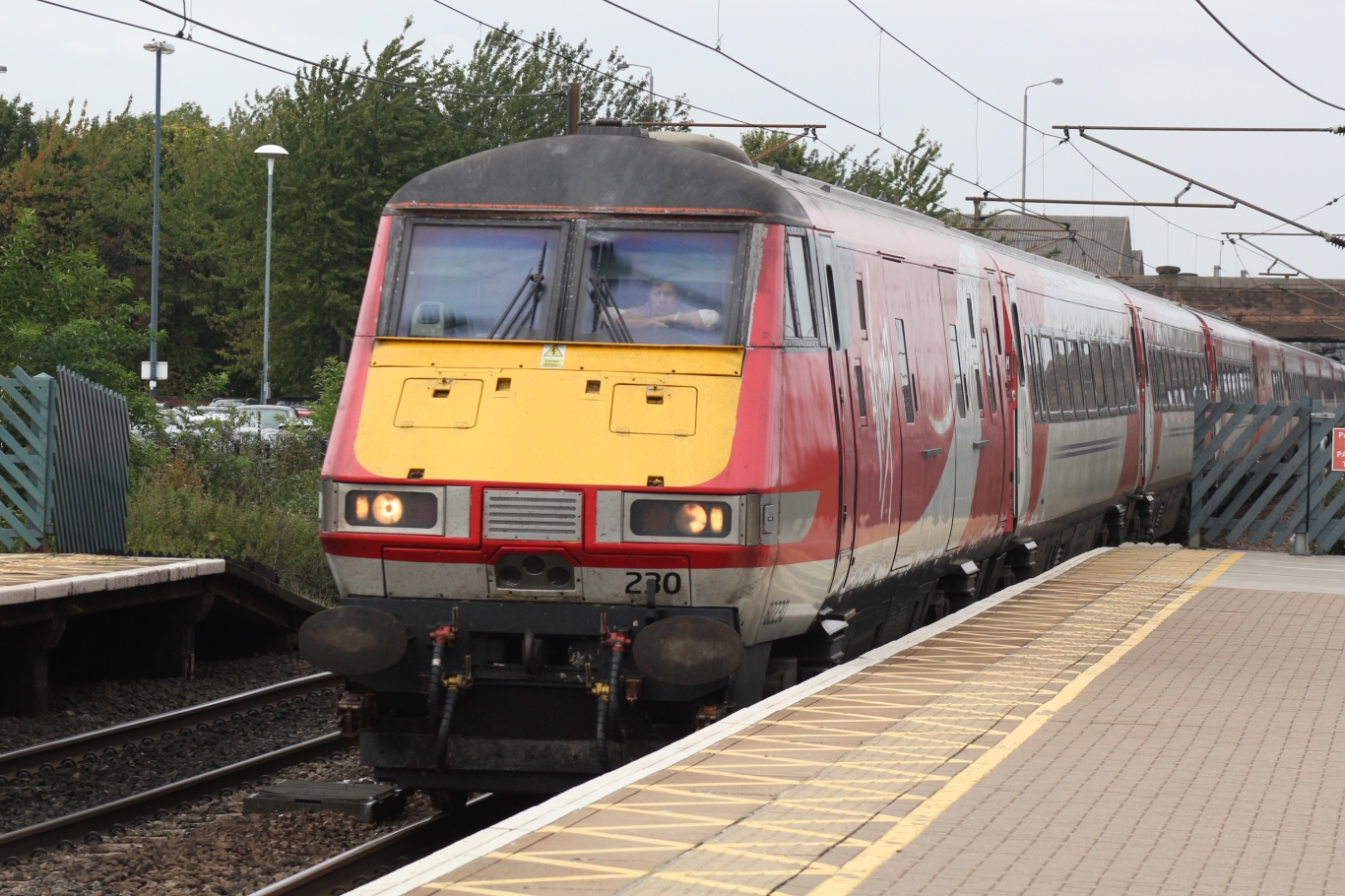
An LNER InterCity 225 travelling southbound to London

Newark Northgate is served by two train operating companies, which provide the following general off-peak services in trains per hour/day (tph/tpd):

London North Eastern Railway:

- 5 tp2h to London King's Cross
- 1 tp2h to Lincoln
- 1 tp2h to Bradford Forster Square, via Leeds
- 1 tp2h to Harrogate, via Leeds
- 1 tph to Edinburgh Waverley, via York and Newcastle
- 2 tpd to Aberdeen, via York, Newcastle, Edinburgh Waverley and Dundee
- 1 tpd to Dundee, via York, Newcastle and Edinburgh Waverley
- 1 tpd to Inverness, via York, Newcastle and Edinburgh Waverley
- 1 tpd to Hull Paragon, via Doncaster.

Some northbound services terminate at earlier stations in early mornings and late evenings.

East Midlands Railway:

- 3 tpd to Lincoln
- 2 tpd to Nottingham
- 1 tpd to Peterborough, via Lincoln.

Preceding station	National Rail	Following station
Grantham	London North Eastern Railway; London to Lincoln/Leeds	Doncaster
Grantham	London North Eastern Railway; London to Lincoln/Leeds	Lincoln
Peterborough	London North Eastern Railway; London to Edinburgh/Inverness	Doncaster
Terminus	East Midlands Railway Newark to Lincoln	Collingham
Newark Castle Limited service	East Midlands Railway Newark to Lincoln	Collingham
	Disused railways	
Claypole	Great Northern Railway East Coast Main Line	Carlton on Trent
Cotham	Great Northern Railway Nottingham to Newark	Terminus
Cotham	Great Northern Railway Leicester Belgrave Road to Newark	Terminus

== See also ==
- Listed buildings in Newark-on-Trent
