= East Midlands Railway =

British railway company

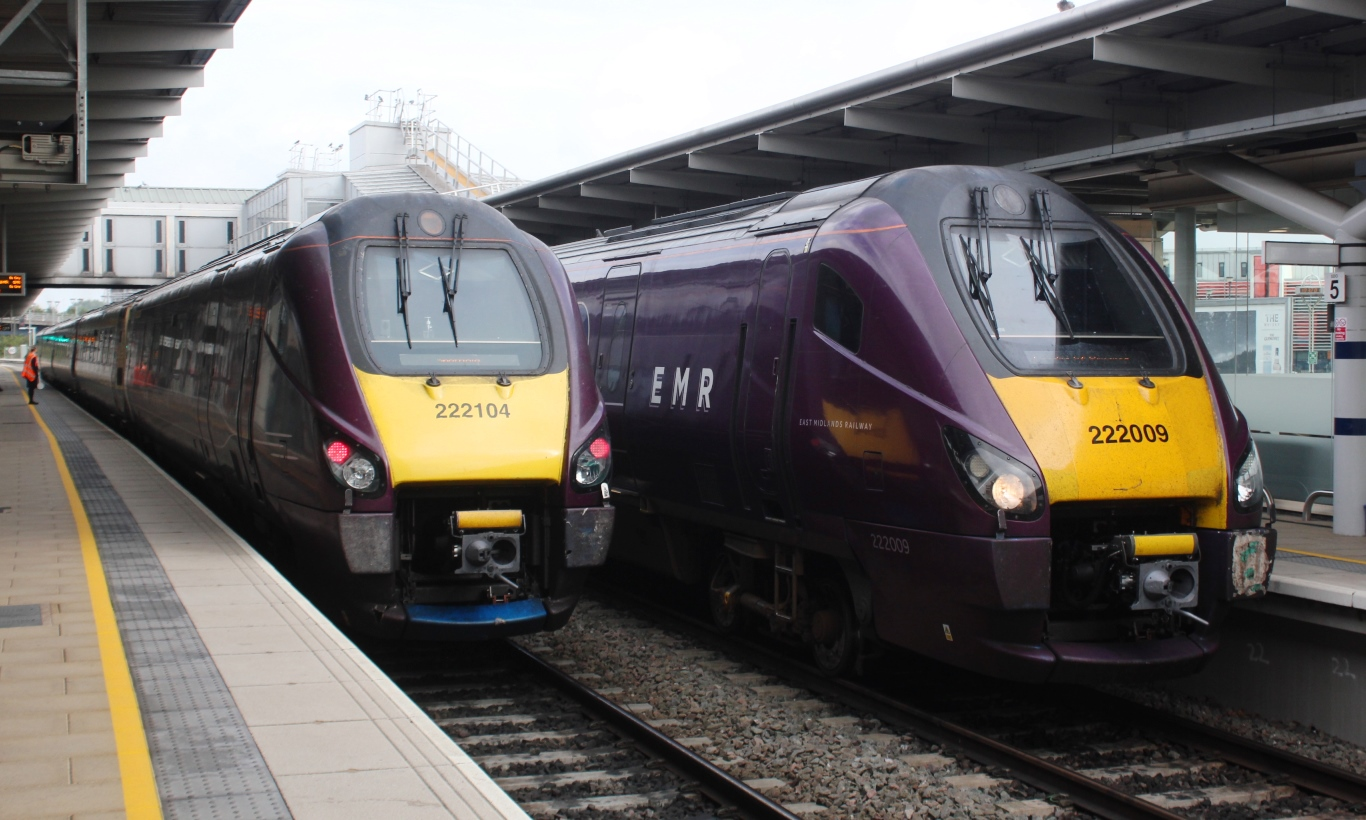
- Class 222 units at Derby in EMR Intercity livery

Overview
- Franchise: East Midlands (18 August 2019 – 18 October 2030)
- Main regions: East Midlands; Greater London; North West England; Yorkshire & the Humber
- Other regions: East of England; West Midlands
- Fleet: Class 158 Express Sprinter; Class 170 Turbostar; Class 222 Meridian; Class 360 Desiro; Class 810 Aurora
- Stations called at: 140
- Parent company: Transport UK Group
- Headquarters: Derby
- Reporting mark: EM
- Predecessor: East Midlands Trains

Other
- Website: www.eastmidlandsrailway.co.uk
Route map

Transport UK East Midlands Limited, trading as East Midlands Railway (EMR), is a British train operating company owned by Transport UK Group, and is the current operator of the East Midlands franchise.

Originally owned by Abellio, EMR took over operations from East Midlands Trains (EMT) on 18 August 2019, on an agreement to run the franchise for eight years. As part of the franchise commitments, EMR placed an order for 33 new bi-mode Class 810 Aurora high speed train sets, and sourced over 40 pre-existing Class 170 Turbostar diesel multiple units from other operators.

During early 2020, passenger numbers and ticket revenues collapsed following the onset of the COVID-19 pandemic, leading to the original franchise agreement being initially suspended before being replaced entirely. Under the new National Rail Contract signed in 2022, the contract is to last until October 2030. In February 2023, Transport UK Group concluded a management buyout of Abellio's United Kingdom business, which included EMR. Following changes by the Starmer government, after the contract expires the services will return to public ownership as part of Great British Railways.

== History ==
=== Background ===
In March 2017, the Department for Transport (DfT) announced that Arriva, a joint venture between FirstGroup and Trenitalia, and incumbent Stagecoach had been shortlisted to bid for the next East Midlands franchise. Abellio was also shortlisted for the franchise during February 2018.

In April 2018, FirstGroup and Trenitalia pulled out of the bidding process, their stated reason for doing so being to focus on the West Coast Partnership franchise. During April 2019, it was announced that the franchise has been awarded to Abellio, with East Midlands Railway (EMR) to take over the franchise from East Midlands Trains (EMT) on 18 August 2019 for a period of eight years; rival bidder Stagecoach had been disqualified from the process because its submission failed to meet employee pension obligations.

In June 2019, Abellio revealed its branding and colour scheme for EMR, which featured distinct purple and white colours that reflected the heritage of the East Midlands. The company also confirmed that it would divide the franchise's services into three segments:

- EMR Intercity for long-distance services from London St Pancras
- EMR Regional for services across the East Midlands
- EMR Electrics for the outer suburban London St Pancras to Corby service

EMR Electrics was later rebranded as EMR Connect following an announcement in April 2021.

=== COVID-19 and franchise suspension ===
Following the onset of the COVID-19 pandemic in the United Kingdom and a resulting collapse in both passenger numbers and ticket revenues in March 2020, the franchise agreement was suspended and replaced by an Emergency Measure Agreement for six months under which the DfT assumed responsibility for all revenues and costs and EMR was instead paid a management fee. This arrangement was superseded by an Emergency Recovery Measures Agreement (ERMA) under which the original franchise agreement was terminated. At the time, it was announced that the EMR franchise would operate until March 2022.

In October 2021, the DfT issued an updated prior information notice that confirmed that the ERMA period would be extended until 16 October 2022. During October 2022, it was announced that EMR had received a direct award of a four-year National Rail Contract with a core term expiry on 18 October 2026 and an optional extension up to 2030. Once the core term of the contract has expired, the DfT may end the contract at any time by providing notice.

=== Industrial action and ownership change ===
EMR was one of several train operators impacted by the 2022–2023 United Kingdom railway strikes, which was the first national rail strike in the UK for three decades. Its workers were amongst those who participated in industrial action due to a dispute over pay and working conditions. On multiple occasions, EMR has requested that the travelling public avoid using its services on certain dates due to these strikes.

During February 2023, Transport UK Group concluded a management buyout of Abellio's United Kingdom business, which included EMR.

=== Return to public ownership ===
The core term of EMR's contract with the DfT expires on 18 October 2026, with full expiry due on or before 18 October 2030. However, it is expected to return to public ownership as part of Great British Railways by the end of 2027. In October 2026, the company was told by the DfT to take immediate action to improve its poor performance, which included delays, cancellations and overcrowding partially linked to issues with the Class 810 rolling stock.

== Services ==
EMR operates commuter services from London St Pancras to Corby, as well as Intercity services from London St Pancras along the Midland Main Line to Nottingham and Sheffield with limited extensions to Lincoln. EMR also operate the local East Midlands services and inter regional services to Liverpool and Norwich (Express service). Services from Nottingham to Liverpool Lime Street were to transfer to another operator during the life of the franchise, although following a review by the DfT, this will no longer take place; the service instead being split at Nottingham as intended but remaining with EMR. The Barton line was expected to transfer from Northern in 2019 but this was delayed until May 2021.

On 19 June 2021, EMR Regional services were cut to enable the timetable to run effectively. Although EMR stated that 85% of services were still running, there was still an impact to local commuter services.

Contactless payment cards can be used between London St Pancras and Luton Airport Parkway.

As of December 2025, East Midlands Railway's regular off-peak services Monday-Friday include:

=== EMR Intercity ===
Route	tph	Calling at
London St Pancras International – Nottingham	2	Kettering, Market Harborough, Leicester, Loughborough (1 tph), East Midlands Parkway (1 tph), Beeston (1 tph); Loughborough, East Midlands Parkway and Beeston are served by the same trains.
London St Pancras International – Sheffield	2	Leicester, Loughborough (1 tph), East Midlands Parkway (1 tph), Long Eaton (1 tph), Derby, Chesterfield; Loughborough, East Midlands Parkway and Long Eaton are served by the same trains.

=== EMR Regional ===
EMR Regional is a brand used on regional routes, most of which terminate at or pass through Nottingham, including services from Norwich to Liverpool Lime Street and from Crewe to Newark Castle.

They run a mixture of Class 158s and Class 170s with 158s normally confined to the Norwich to Liverpool stretch. EMR introduced Class 170s to replace the 153s and 156s which have since been withdrawn, and initially the 158s, which will now be kept for the foreseeable future and are planned for refurbishment along with the 170s.

The Norwich to Liverpool service was initially planned to terminate at Nottingham with the stretch to Liverpool Lime Street taken over during the franchise by another operator, likely TransPennine Express. However, this is no longer taking place.

Derwent Valley line
Route	tph	Calling at
Lincoln – Matlock	1/2	Hykeham; Swinderby; Collingham; Newark Castle; Nottingham; Beeston; Long Eaton; Spondon; Derby; Duffield; Belper; Ambergate; Whatstandwell; Cromford; Matlock Bath; Alternates with the Cleethorpes – Matlock service
Cleethorpes – Matlock	1/2	New Clee; Grimsby Docks; Grimsby Town; Habrough; Barnetby; Market Rasen; Lincoln; Hykeham; Collingham; Newark Castle; Nottingham; Beeston; Long Eaton; Spondon; Derby; Duffield; Belper; Ambergate; Whatstandwell; Cromford; Matlock Bath; Alternates with the Lincoln – Matlock service
Lincoln – Newark Northgate	4 tpd	Hykeham; Swinderby; Collingham
Crewe–Derby line
Route	tph	Calling at
Crewe – Lincoln	1	Alsager; Kidsgrove; Stoke-on-Trent; Longton; Blythe Bridge; Uttoxeter; Tutbury & Hatton; Derby; Long Eaton; Attenborough; Beeston; Nottingham; Carlton; Burton Joyce; Lowdham; Thurgarton (1 tp2h); Bleasby (1 tp2h); Fiskerton; Rolleston (1 tp2h); Newark Castle; Hykeham; Bleasby and Thurgarton are served by the same trains and alternate trains to Rolleston
Route	tph	Calling at
Leicester – Nottingham	1	Syston; Sileby; Barrow-upon-Soar; Loughborough; East Midlands Parkway; Attenborough; Beeston
Nottingham–Grantham and Poacher lines
Route	tph	Calling at
Nottingham – Skegness	1	Radcliffe; Bingham; Aslockton (1 tp2h); Bottesford (1 tp2h), Grantham; Sleaford; Heckington; Boston; Wainfleet; Bottesford and Aslockton are served by alternate services.
Robin Hood Line
Route	tph	Calling at
Nottingham – Worksop	1	Bulwell; Hucknall; Newstead; Kirkby-in-Ashfield; Sutton Parkway; Mansfield; Mansfield Woodhouse; Shirebrook; Langwith-Whaley Thorns (1 tp2h); Creswell; Whitwell (1 tp2h); Langwith-Whaley Thorns and Whitwell are served by alternating trains.
Peterborough to Doncaster via Doncaster–Lincoln line
Route	tph	Calling at
Peterborough – Lincoln	1	Spalding; Sleaford; Ruskington, Metheringham
Lincoln – Doncaster	1/2	Saxilby; Gainsborough Lea Road
Liverpool to Norwich
Route	tph	Calling at
Liverpool Lime Street – Norwich	1	Liverpool South Parkway; Widnes; Warrington Central; Manchester Oxford Road; Manchester Piccadilly; Stockport; Sheffield; Chesterfield; Alfreton; Nottingham; Grantham; Peterborough; Ely; Thetford
Barton line
Route	tph	Calling at
Barton-on-Humber – Cleethorpes	1/2	Barrow Haven; New Holland; Goxhill; Thornton Abbey; Ulceby; Habrough; Stallingborough; Healing; Great Coates; Grimsby Town

=== EMR Connect / Luton Airport Express ===
EMR Connect Luton Airport Express
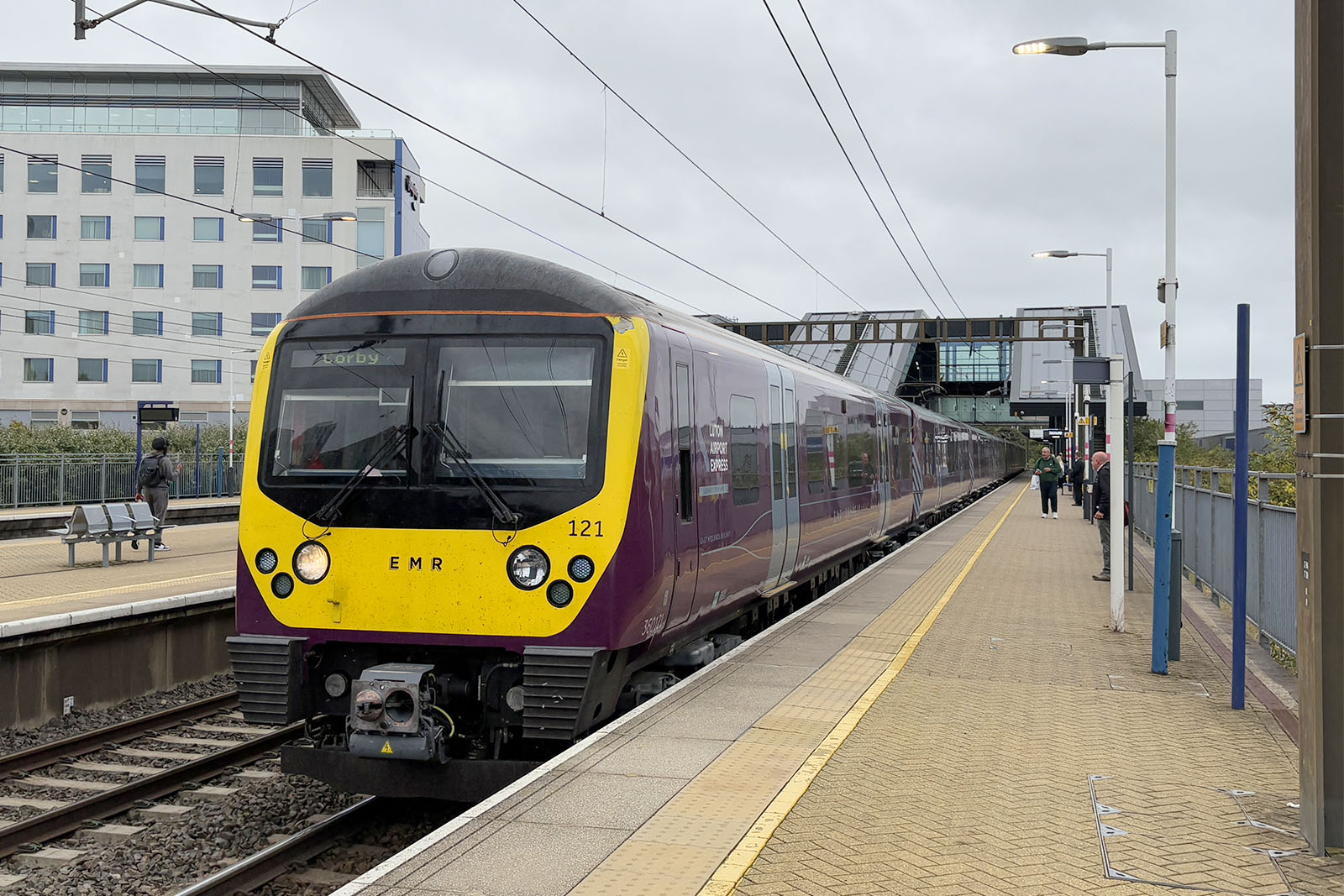
- An EMR Connect Class 360 at Luton Airport Parkway

Overview
- Locale: East of England
- Current operators: East Midlands Railway, 17 May 2021 – 18 October 2026
- Website: https://www.lutonairportexpress.co.uk/

Route
- Termini: St Pancras; Corby
- Train number: EM
- Line used: Midland Main Line

Technical
- Rolling stock: 21 Class 360s
- Track gauge: 1,435 mm (4 ft 8 1/2 in) standard gauge
- Electrification: Overhead line, 25 kV 50 Hz AC
- Track owner: Network Rail

EMR Connect is a commuter service linking Corby with London St Pancras. The service began in May 2021 using Class 360s formerly used by Greater Anglia following the electrification of the Midland Main Line from Bedford to Kettering and Corby in 2020. It was initially planned to be known as EMR Electrics until just before its launch date in April 2021.

In March 2023, the Luton DART, an automated guided people mover, opened between Luton Airport and Luton Airport Parkway railway station. From then on, EMR simultaneously brands EMR Connect as the airport rail link Luton Airport Express since the services are non stop from St Pancras to Luton Airport Parkway, with a headline figure of 32 minutes from London St Pancras to the airport terminal using the Luton DART, the cost of which is included in the train ticket price.

Route	tph	Calling at
London St Pancras International – Corby	2	Luton Airport Parkway, Luton, Bedford, Wellingborough, Kettering

== Rolling stock ==
East Midlands Railway inherited a fleet of 28 Class 43, 21 Class 153, 15 Class 156, 26 Class 158, and 27 Class 222 units from East Midlands Trains. In January 2020, nine additional Class 156 units from Greater Anglia were introduced into service. Nine 8-carriage InterCity 125 sets were also transferred from London North Eastern Railway, with the first set having entered service on 4 May 2020. They were replaced in May 2021. To replace the former Grand Central “buffered” HST sets, EMR commenced a lease of the four former Hull Trains Class 180 fleet despite their history of technical difficulties, with the first units entering service on 13 December 2020. On 16 May 2021, East Midlands Railway launched EMR Connect services between Corby and London St Pancras, which has enabled the final HSTs to be withdrawn. The Connect service is operated by ex-Greater Anglia Class 360s.

By 2023, East Midlands Railway planned to run EMR Regional services using 40 Class 170 units (in fact, they have 43 170s so far), and by 2024 plans to run EMR Intercity services using 33 new bi-mode Class 810 Aurora units.

The final Class 170s from West Midlands Trains were delivered in May 2023, and the last unit from Transport for Wales was transferred on 28 January 2024. EMR also has 170s acquired from ScotRail and Southern; the latter were converted back to 170s from previously converted Class 171s by reinstating their original type of couplers.

The company is refurbishing the stock used for its regional services.

=== Current fleet ===
Family	Class	Image	Type	Top Speed		Number	Carriages	Routes operated	Built
Family	Class	Image	Type	mph	km/h	Number	Carriages	Routes operated	Built
EMR Intercity
Bombardier Voyager	222 Meridian		DEMU	125	200	23	5	Intercity routes (Midland Main Line)	2003–2005
Bombardier Voyager	222 Meridian		DEMU	125	200	4	7	Intercity routes (Midland Main Line)	2003–2005
Hitachi AT300	810 Aurora		BMU	125	200	33 (when fully deployed)	5	Intercity routes (Midland Main Line)	2021–present
EMR Connect / Luton Airport Express
Siemens Desiro	360 Desiro		EMU	110	180	21	4	Connect route	2002–2003
EMR Regional
Sprinter	158 Express Sprinter		DMU	90	145	26	2	Regional routes (mostly Liverpool to Norwich services)	1989–1992
Bombardier Turbostar	170 Turbostar		DMU	100	161	27	2	Regional routes	1999–2002
Bombardier Turbostar	170 Turbostar		DMU	100	161	16	3	Regional routes	1999–2002

=== Past fleet ===
The last of the InterCity 125 sets East Midlands Railway inherited from East Midlands Trains were withdrawn in December 2020, having been replaced by five ex LNER InterCity 125 sets which had greater compliance with new regulations and four Class 180s. Originally nine former LNER sets were to replace a similar number of sets inherited from East Midlands Trains. However, after the carriages were found to require more repairs than originally envisaged, this was cut back to five sets.

In December 2021, the final Class 153s were withdrawn, as they were not PRM (Persons with Reduced Mobility) compliant, with Class 156s replacing them on the Barton line from 13 December. These units were placed into storage at Long Marston and Ely Papworth Sidings in December 2021.

In December 2022, four Class 156 units went off lease and were sent for storage at Barrow Hill, with East Midlands Railway stating that they will be moved to Ely Papworth sidings at a later date.

East Midlands Railway withdrew the last of its Class 156 fleet and its entire 180 fleet in May 2023.

Class	Family	Image	Type	Top Speed		Number	Carriages	Routes operated	Withdrawn
Class	Family	Image	Type	mph	km/h	Number	Carriages	Routes operated	Withdrawn
EMR Intercity
43 (HST)	InterCity 125		Locomotive	125	200	24	N/A	Intercity routes (Midland Main Line); Nottingham – Skegness (Summer Saturdays only)	2020
43 (HST)	InterCity 125		Locomotive	125	200	6	N/A	Intercity routes (Midland Main Line); Nottingham – Skegness (Summer Saturdays only)	2020
43 (HST)	InterCity 125		Locomotive	125	200	23	N/A	Intercity routes (Midland Main Line); Nottingham – Skegness (Summer Saturdays only)	2020–2021
Mark 3	InterCity 125		Coach	125	200	94	N/A	Intercity routes (Midland Main Line); Nottingham – Skegness (Summer Saturdays only)	2020
Mark 3	InterCity 125		Coach	125	200	78	N/A	Intercity routes (Midland Main Line); Nottingham – Skegness (Summer Saturdays only)	2020–2021
180 Adelante	Alstom Coradia		DHMU	125	200	4	5	Intercity routes (Midland Main Line); Nottingham – Skegness (Summer Saturdays only)	2023
EMR Regional
153	Super Sprinter		DMU	75	120	21	1	Regional routes	2019–2021
156	Super Sprinter		DMU	75	120	24	2	Regional routes	2021-2023

== Depots ==
EMR operates two depots: Derby Etches Park and Nottingham Eastcroft. The Class 360s are maintained at Bedford Cauldwell Walk depot by Siemens Mobility.

== Accidents and incidents ==
On 19 June 2026, a Class 360 unit travelling from Corby to London collided with a stationary Class 810 unit travelling from Nottingham to London near Elstow, just south of Bedford. One person, the driver of one of the trains, was killed and 100 people were injured, eleven of which were very serious.

Preceded by East Midlands Trains	Operator of East Midlands franchise 2019–2026	Succeeded by Incumbent
