= Lincoln railway station =

Railway station in Lincolnshire, England

Lincoln
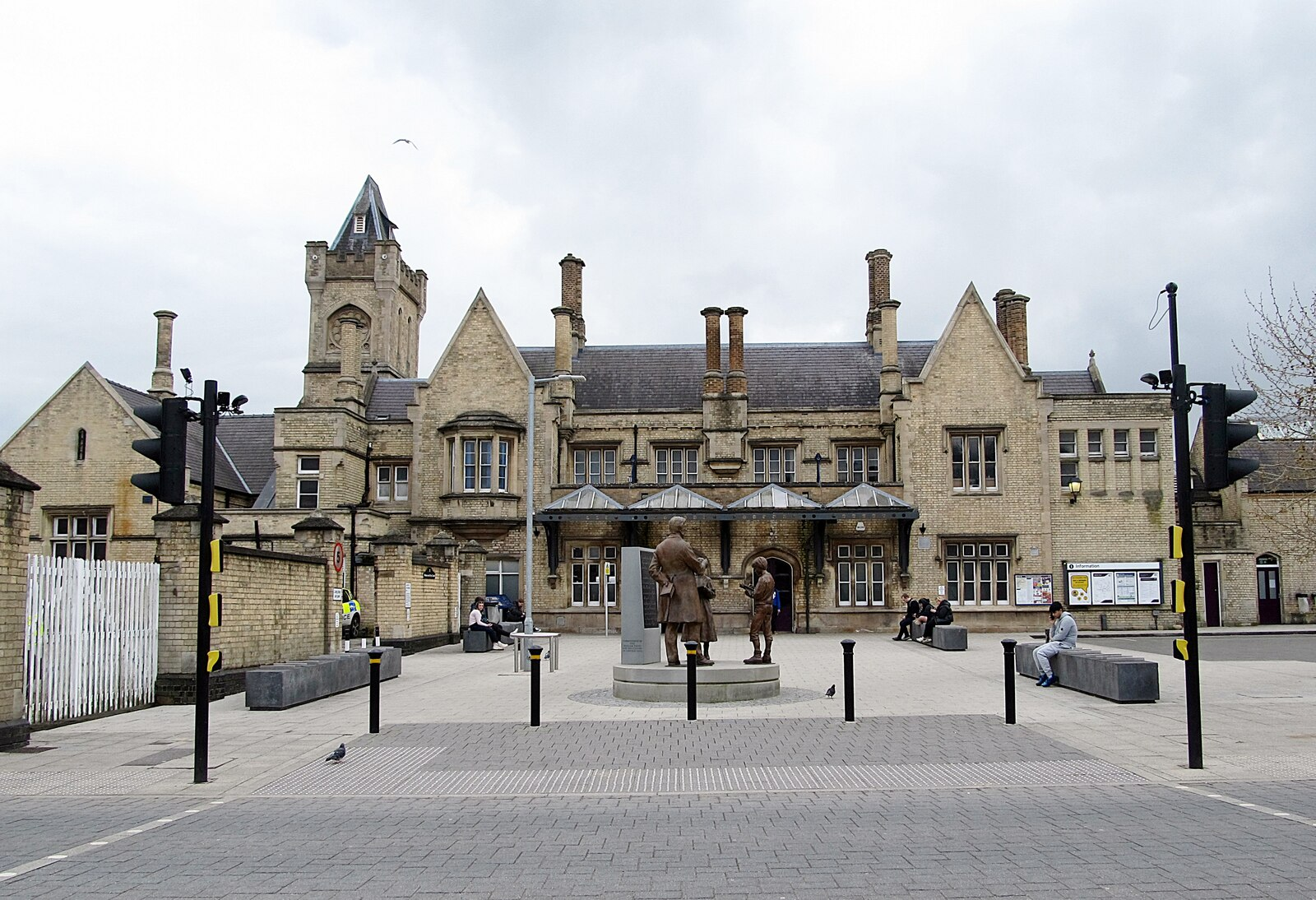
- A view of the station

General information
- Location: Lincoln, City of Lincoln, England
- Coordinates: 53.226°N 0.539°W
- Grid reference: SK976708
- Manager: East Midlands Railway
- Platforms: 5

Other information
- Station code: LCN
- Classification: DfT category C1

History
- Opened: 17 October 1848

Passengers
- 2020/21: ▼0.431 million
- Interchange: ▼7,714
- 2021/22: ▲1.501 million
- Interchange: ▲34,181
- 2022/23: ▲1.834 million
- Interchange: ▼15,497
- 2023/24: ▲2.060 million
- Interchange: ▲19,060
- 2024/25: ▲2.286 million
- Interchange: ▲19,773

Listed Building – Grade II
- Feature: Lincoln Station and footbridge and platform building and yard walls
- Designated: 16 March 1990
- Reference no.: 1388752
Location
Notes
- Passenger statistics from the Office of Rail and Road

Lincoln railway station (previously Lincoln Central) serves the city of Lincoln, in Lincolnshire, England. The station is owned by Network Rail and managed by East Midlands Railway, which provides the majority of services from the station, along with Northern Trains and London North Eastern Railway. It is the busiest station in the county and the fifth busiest in the East Midlands.

Lincoln Central bus station, the city's main bus station, lies within a couple of minutes' walk to the north-east of the station; it is easily accessed via a pedestrian crossing and pedestrianised plaza.

== History ==
The station buildings were designed by John Henry Taylor of London in 1848, for the Great Northern Railway company. It is built in a Tudor revival style of yellow brick, with stone dressings and slate roofs, with six ridge and eight side wall stacks. The buildings and footbridge were Grade II listed in 1990.

It is now the only station in Lincoln, since the closure of Lincoln St. Marks in 1985. Despite this, the station retained its Central suffix until 2019. The station's "welcome" message, recorded by East Midlands Trains and still in use, refers to the station as Lincoln Central.

In late 2010, East Midlands Trains announced that it intended to develop an improved customer service area and improve the café and toilets.

Lincoln was included in the Lincoln Transport Hub redevelopment scheme, which improved connectivity between bus and rail services in Lincoln through the construction of a new bus station. Thus also included a new pedestrianised plaza outside the main entrance on St Mary's Street. Construction of the Transport Hub commenced in August 2016 and was completed in January 2018.

=== Services to London ===
For many years, Lincoln lacked direct rail services to London. However, the awarding of two new rail franchises saw this remedied.

On 14 August 2007, it was announced that National Express East Coast (NXEC) would take over the InterCity East Coast franchise in December 2007. As part of the commitment, NXEC planned to introduce a two-hourly service between Lincoln and London King's Cross, starting in 2009. This service would have alternated with a two-hourly service to York. The InterCity East Coast Franchise was passed to East Coast in November 2009. In late 2009, East Coast, along with Network Rail, published details of the proposed new ECML timetable, including the Lincoln-London services. In spring 2010 it was announced that this new service would be cut back. East Coast, citing financial restraints during the credit crunch, announced instead just one direct train in each direction per day, with extra services running only as far as Newark North Gate, meaning Lincoln passengers will still have to change trains there. On 22 May 2011 East Coast started direct Lincoln-London Kings Cross services, albeit in a much reduced number than they had originally planned. There is one train a day to London leaving Lincoln at 07:30 Monday-Friday and 07:33 on Saturday, there is no East Coast Service to London on a Sunday. The return service leaves London at 19:06 Monday-Friday, 18:08 on Saturday and 19:08 on Sunday. The operation passed over to Virgin Trains East Coast in early 2015 and as of June 2018 the King's Cross service is now operated by London North Eastern Railway. LNER have started running two-hourly trains between Lincoln and King's Cross.

In April 2019, the new East Midlands Railway franchise was awarded, which included several key improvements for services in Lincoln. These included an increase of London St Pancras to Lincoln services to two trains per day, as well as the introduction of hourly services between Doncaster and Peterborough via Lincoln from December 2021 instead of the current hourly Peterborough to Lincoln service and five trains per day between Doncaster and Lincoln. Other improvements as part of the new franchise include hourly services will be introduced between Nottingham and Grimsby Town via Lincoln with limited extensions to Cleethorpes, which would be achieved by extending the existing Leicester to Lincoln service to Grimsby Town. The existing Newark North Gate to Grimsby service would instead terminate at Lincoln. On 9 May 2019, following the end of the standstill period, Abellio confirmed they planned to extend the Leicester service to Grimsby Town.

=== Accidents and incidents ===
- On 3 June 1962, the Lincoln rail crash occurred due to an express passenger train being derailed, due to excessive speed on a curve. Three people were killed and 49 were injured.

== Layout ==
The station has a total of five platforms:

- 1 and 2 are bay platforms, used for daytime stabling of trains and for terminating arrivals from the east which will return east. Trains arriving from the east which will form westbound services will be routed into one of the through platforms
- 3, 4 and 5 are bidirectional through platforms, used for services on all routes; all three are used in whichever way is most operationally advantageous
  - 3 is adjacent the main station building and is nearest platform to the station entrance. It hosts the ticket barriers, buffet/shop, a waiting room, accessible toilet and staff facilities
  - 4 and 5 are the two faces of the island platform. Passenger waiting rooms and toilets are on the island platform, as is the staff conference room.

== Services ==
Passenger services at Lincoln are operated by three train operating companies, which operate the following off-peak pattern in trains per hour (tph):

East Midlands Railway:

- 1 tph to Matlock, via Newark Castle, Nottingham and Derby
- 1tph to Crewe, via Newark Castle, Nottingham and Derby
- 4 tpd to Newark Northgate, via Hykeham
- 1 tph to Peterborough, via Metheringham, Sleaford and Spalding
- 1 tp2h to Doncaster, via Saxilby and Gainsborough Lea Road
- 1 tp2h to Cleethorpes, via Market Rasen and Habrough.

Northern Trains

- 1 tph to Leeds, via Retford, Sheffield and Barnsley.

London North Eastern Railway

- 1 tp2h to London King's Cross, via Newark Northgate, Grantham and Peterborough.

Preceding station	National Rail	Following station
Saxilby	Northern Trains Sheffield to Lincoln Line	Terminus
Collingham	East Midlands Railway Midland Main Line; Limited Service	Terminus
Hykeham	East Midlands Railway Nottingham to Lincoln Line	Terminus
Saxilby	East Midlands Railway Doncaster to Lincoln Line; Monday-Saturday only	Terminus
Terminus	East Midlands Railway Peterborough to Lincoln Line; Monday-Saturday only	Metheringham
Collingham	East Midlands Railway Newark to Grimsby	Market Rasen
Hykeham Limited Service	East Midlands Railway Newark to Grimsby	Market Rasen
Newark Northgate	London North Eastern Railway; East Coast Main Line	Terminus
Historical railways
Skellingthorpe Line and station closed	Great Northern and Great Eastern Joint Railway	Branston and Heighington Line open, station closed
Waddington Line and station closed	Great Northern Railway Grantham and Lincoln railway line	Terminus
Terminus	Great Northern Railway Lincolnshire Loop Line	Washingborough Line and station closed
Skellingthorpe Line and station closed	Great Central Railway Dukeries Route	Terminus

== Development work ==
=== Resignalling ===
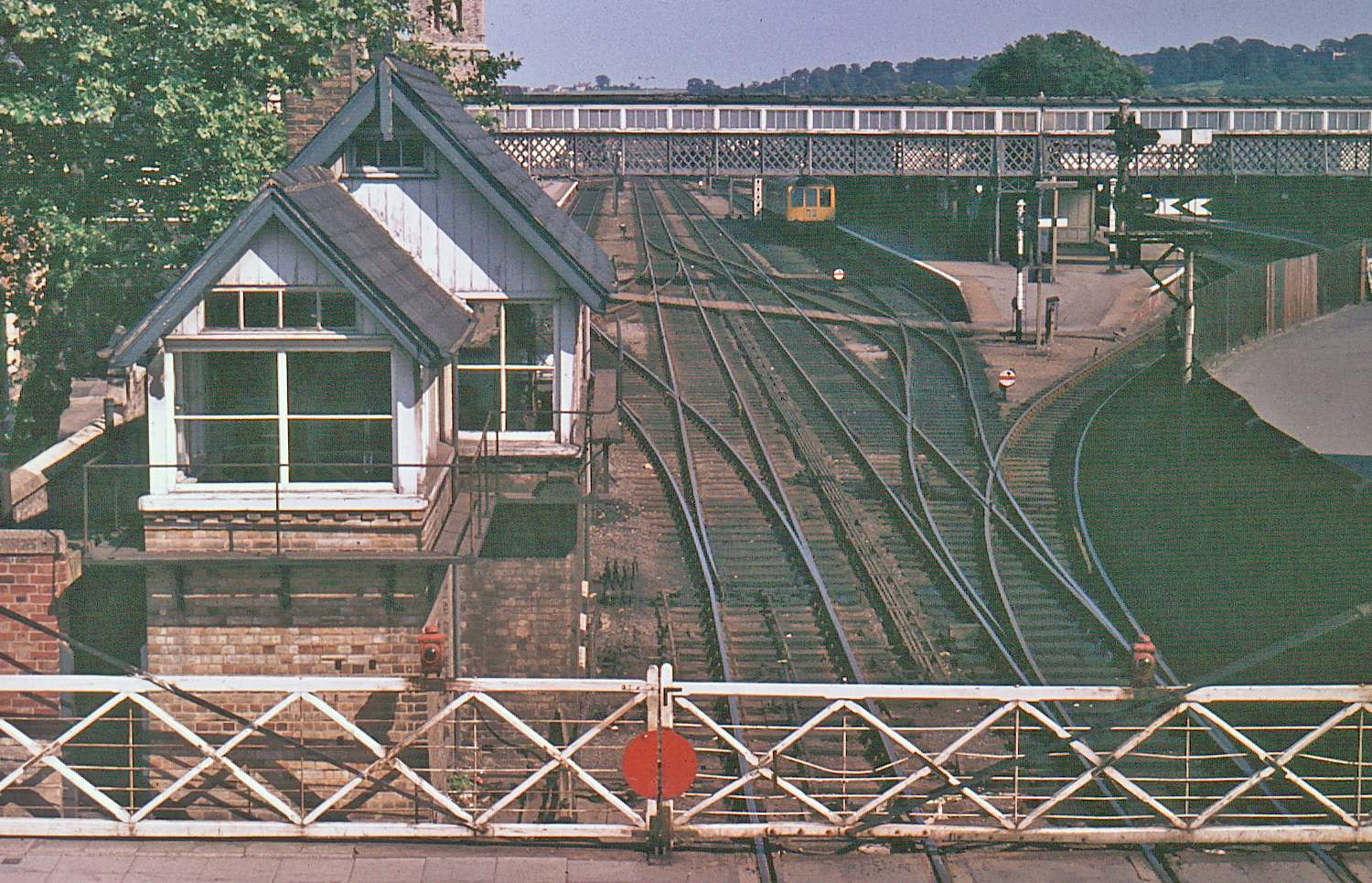
The old layout and signalling, seen in 1977

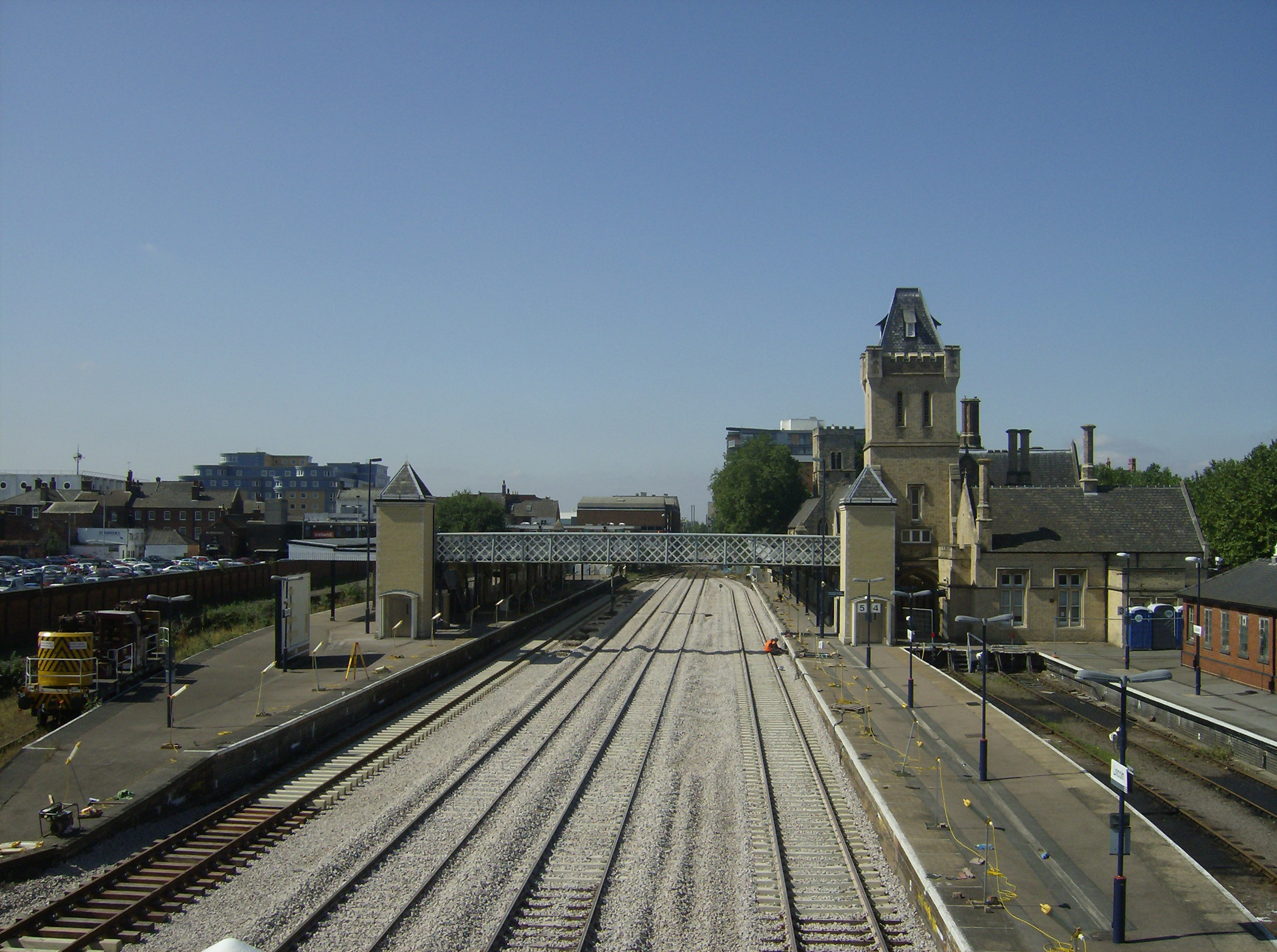
View of the station in August 2007 showing the then recently relaid track

Network Rail instituted a major resignalling scheme for Lincoln during the years 2007–2008 which saw:

- the replacement of the semaphore signals with colour light signals,
- the concentration of all signalling control into one signal box rather than the previous four,
- track relaying, and ballasting
- new points and crossovers which allow all three through platforms at Lincoln to be used in both directions and allows trains from the east to enter the two bay platforms (1 and 2) directly.

As a direct result, terminating trains no longer need to shunt from one side of the station to the other to take up their return workings, reducing turnaround times for terminating trains and improve train service punctuality and reliability.

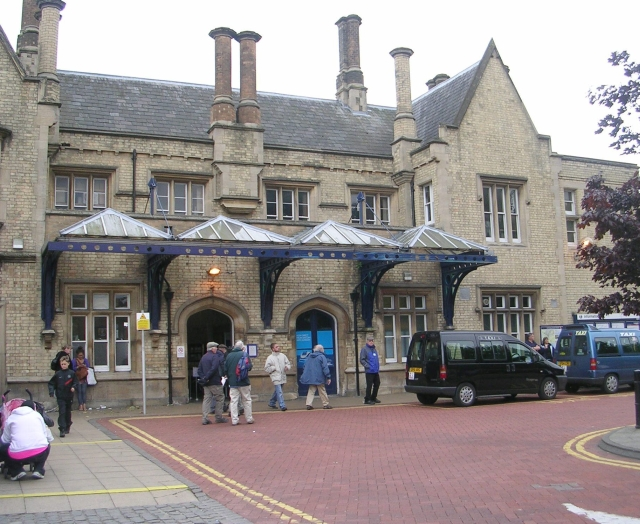
The ornate main entrance

Lincoln's platforms were renumbered from 3–7 to 1–5. All four existing signal boxes – High Street, East Holmes, West Holmes and Pelham Street Junction – were closed and replaced by a new state of the art signalling centre near the West Holmes box. Pelham Street and West Holmes boxes were demolished, but the High Street and East Holmes boxes are listed buildings and are preserved.

=== Future development ===
There are also plans for improvements to the railway station itself, alongside the construction of a new footbridge over the railway line from Tentercroft Street into the city centre to increase the connectivity of the city centre on foot and by cycle.
