= Swinderby =

Village and civil parish in the North Kesteven district of Lincolnshire, England

Coordinates: 53.158°N 0.702°W

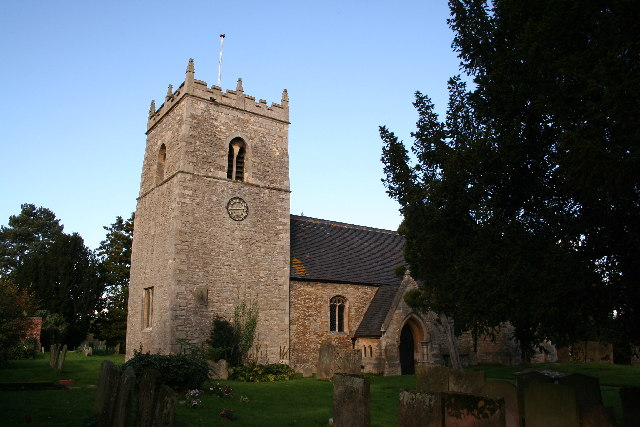
- All Saints' Church, Swinderby

- Location within Lincolnshire
- Population: 648 (2011)
- OS grid reference: SK 8662
  - London: 120 mi (190 km) S
- District: North Kesteven
- Shire county: Lincolnshire
- Region: East Midlands
- Country: England
- Sovereign state: United Kingdom
- Post town: LINCOLN
- Postcode district: LN6
- Dialling code: 01522
- Police: Lincolnshire
- Fire: Lincolnshire
- Ambulance: East Midlands
- UK Parliament: Sleaford and North Hykeham

Swinderby is a village and civil parish in the North Kesteven district of Lincolnshire, England, just north of the A46 road, 8 miles (13 km) south-west of Lincoln and 6 miles (10 km) north-east of Newark. Swinderby lies within a rural agricultural community and covers an area of 2,200 acres (9 km^{2}). The population was 648 (including HM Prison Morton Hall) at the 2011 census.

== History ==
The name 'Swinderby' is assumed to have originated either from "sundri + by" (southern farmstead or village), or "svin + djur + by" (farmstead where pigs are kept); in the Domesday Book of 1086 it is referred to as "Sunderby" and "Suindrebi".

The settlement might date back to at least Roman times as Roman pottery and parts of the Fosse Way have been found. Some village buildings date back to the 17th century.

The church of All Saints is predominantly Norman and Early English, however restoration was carried out in 1854, 1879 and 1910.

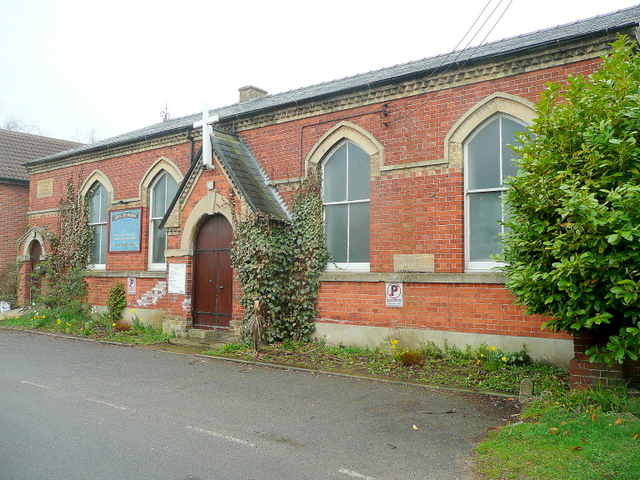
Wesleyan Chapel, now the Light and Life Mission Hall

In 1872 there was a Wesleyan chapel.

=== 1980 air crash ===
On Thursday 8 May 1980 a BAC Jet Provost 'XW314' from RAF Cranwell crashed, around 100 yds from the A46.

The pilots landed 1.5 miles away on the edge of Norton Disney woods. Flt Lt Chris Massey was the instructor, of St Martin's Close in Ancaster, a former Vulcan pilot of 44 Sqn at RAF Waddington. Fg Off PC Jones was the pilot being instructed. Fire engines arrived from Lincoln, North Hykeham, Collingham and Newark.

== Community ==
The village has a public house, a church, a village hall, two playing fields and a primary school with nursery.

The school is the All Saints' Church of England Primary School, which was rated as overall Grade 2 (good), in its 2012 Ofsted inspection.

Swinderby is close to the now closed RAF airfield, RAF Swinderby, which holds a bi-monthly antique and collectors fair that has been featured on BBC1's Bargain Hunt.

News and event notices are carried in the village Swinderby Link-up magazine. This publication also includes adverts from local businesses.
