= Grimsby–Lincoln–Newark line =

Railway line in England

Overview
- Status: Operational
- Owner: Network Rail
- Locale: Lincolnshire; Nottinghamshire
- Termini: Grimsby; Newark Castle Newark Northgate
- Stations: 13

Service
- Type: Heavy rail
- System: National Rail
- Operator(s): East Midlands Railway; London North Eastern Railway; TransPennine Express; Northern

Technical
- Number of tracks: Two
- Track gauge: 4 ft 8 1/2 in (1,435 mm) standard gauge

The Grimsby–Lincoln–Newark line is a railway line in England. It runs from Grimsby Town to Newark Northgate and Newark Castle via Market Rasen and Lincoln.

== Services ==
As of 21 May 2023, East Midlands Railway operate one train per hour from Leicester to Lincoln via Newark Castle, with every other train continuing to Grimsby Town via Market Rasen. An approximately hourly service is also provided during morning peak hours from Newark Northgate to Lincoln, and from Grimsby Town to Newark Northgate via Market Rasen; on Saturdays, these services run all day. On Sundays there are only 8 total trains on the Market Rasen branch (5 up, 3 down), with an hourly service between Nottingham and Lincoln.

LNER operate six trains daily in each direction between London King's Cross and Lincoln. Trains run nonstop between Newark Northgate and Lincoln.
