= Bedford–Northampton line =

Railway line in the UK

The Bedford–Northampton line was a branch of the Midland Railway which served stations in three counties: Northampton and Horton in Northamptonshire, Olney in Buckinghamshire and Turvey and Bedford in Bedfordshire, England. Opened in 1872, the intermediate stations closed to passengers in 1962, leaving a small section between Northampton and Piddington station to remain open until 1981 for the purposes of the Ministry of Defence establishment. The track remains down on another small section of the line between Northampton and Brackmills. The reopening of the line has been proposed by the Bedfordshire Railway & Transport Association.

== History ==
=== Authorisation ===
The first proposal to link the county towns of Northampton and Bedford was in 1845 by the Northampton, Bedford and Cambridge Railway, which intended to continue the line to Cambridge. No progress was made and the company collapsed leaving the shareholders out-of-pocket. A second attempt was made in 1864 when the route was surveyed by James Burke for the East and West Junction Railway but the scheme was dropped due to the demands made by owners of land along the proposed alignment. Another attempt was made by the Bedford, Northampton and Leamington Railway for which Sir Charles Fox & Son surveyed a route diverging west from Bedford, passing through Biddenham then south of Turvey to reach Olney before cutting across Flore and Weedon. The successful line was promoted by Lieutenant-Colonel W. B. Higgins of Picts Hill, Turvey, together with James Howard and William Henry Whitbread.

Bedford and Northampton Railway Act 1865
- Act of Parliament
- Parliament of the United Kingdom
- Long title: An Act for making and maintaining "The Bedford and Northampton Railway;" and for other Purposes.
- Citation: 28 & 29 Vict. c. ccclv

Dates
- Royal assent: 5 July 1865

On 5 July 1865, an act of Parliament, the Bedford and Northampton Railway Act 1865 (28 & 29 Vict. c. ccclv), was passed which authorised the Bedford and Northampton Railway with a capital of £400,000 divided into 20,000 shares of £20 each; further powers allowed borrowing up to £133,000. The act empowered the Bedford and Northampton Railway to construct five railways. The first line would start from a junction with the Midland Railway's Leicester to Bedford line from the parish of Bromham to a garden in the parish of All Saints in Northampton which belonged to St John's Priory Hospital. The second line would form a junction between the first line and the Northampton and Peterborough Railway, the third line followed a similar but slightly different alignment, while the fourth and fifth lines would form a junction with the Northampton and Harborough Railway. The lines, which would link the counties of Bedfordshire, Buckinghamshire and Northamptonshire, were surveyed by Charles Liddell.

Under the terms of the Bedford and Northampton Railway Act 1865, the Midland Railway agreed to work the 21.5-mile (34.6-kilometre) line for seven years while retaining 50% of its receipts, and thereafter at 50% of receipts.

=== Construction ===
Bedford and Northampton Railway Act 1866
- Act of Parliament
- Parliament of the United Kingdom
- Long title: An Act for authorizing the Bedford and Northampton Railway Company to construct new Lines of Railway; to abandon Portions of their authorized Line; and for other Purposes.
- Citation: 29 & 30 Vict. c. cclx

Dates
- Royal assent: 23 July 1866

Text of statute as originally enacted

Bedford and Northampton Railway Act 1867
- Act of Parliament
- Parliament of the United Kingdom
- Long title: An Act for authorizing the making by the Bedford and Northampton Railway Company of Lines of Railway by way of Substitution of Lines of Railway already authorized to be made by them; and for other Purposes.
- Citation: 30 & 31 Vict. c. cxxiii

Dates
- Royal assent: 15 July 1867

Text of statute as originally enacted

In the event, only the first and second of the authorised lines were constructed. Two further acts of Parliament were necessary to extend the time needed for completion of the line; the Bedford and Northampton Railway Act 1866 (29 & 30 Vict. c. cclx) and the Bedford and Northampton Railway Act 1867 (30 & 31 Vict. c. cxxiii), due to delays in obtaining funding and appointing a suitable contractor. By 25 August 1870, Edwin Clark Punchard & Co. had been appointed to build the line and the directors of the Bedford and Northampton Railway were informed that works were proceeding rapidly. A meeting of the directors on 18 November 1870 indicated that completion would take place on 31 August 1871 but delays were caused by heavy rains which damaged the line's embankments and cuttings. The contractors would have to satisfy not only the Board of Trade but also the Midland Railway's engineer before services could begin. It had initially been planned for the line to have its own terminus station in Bedford but this idea was dropped due to the demands made by landowners in Bedford, as well as the saving of £20,000 to be made by using the Midland Railway's Bedford station.

Also in 1865, construction was started at Newport Pagnell for an extension of the Wolverton-Newport Pagnell Line to Olney which would have formed a junction at Olney. Construction was abandoned after several major cuttings were excavated north of Newport Pagnell which are visible on old maps.

The line was described as a "contractor's line" as the gradients were very heavy, the steepest being 1 in 84, which rendered it unsuitable for fast trains; the line was also sharply curved and ran mainly through cuttings. The line's summit was at Yardley Chase, 350 feet (110 m) above sea level. In fact, the route was never intended to be a main line, only a rural branch. The line's terminus in Northampton would be St John's Street station which was approached by a new street named "Guildhall Road", also provided for in the Bedford and Northampton Railway Act 1865. Intermediate stations were provided at Turvey, Olney, and Piddington. The line had been diverted closer to Olney as the Marquess of Northampton did not want it running across his land at Yardley Hastings.

=== Operation ===
The line opened on 10 June 1872 and was subsequently vested in the Midland Railway on 31 December 1885 under powers conferred by the Midland Railway (Additional Powers) Act 1885 (48 & 49 Vict. c. xc) of 16 July 1885. Due to the death of the Duke of Bedford, official celebrations to mark the line's opening were postponed to 26 July, when they were held in Bedford's Assembly Rooms. The Midland became part of the London, Midland and Scottish Railway (LMS) upon the 1923 Grouping.

The Midland provided an initial service of five trains a day in each direction; this increased to six in 1922 and seven by 1938, but the service frequency was nevertheless minimal. There was never any Sunday service. St John's station closed in July 1939 following a decision by the LMS to divert all its passenger services to Northampton Castle station, where branch services used bay platforms at the London end of the station. This required the junction with the London and North Western Railway's Blisworth to Peterborough line at Hardingstone to be reversed. The change meant that trains called additionally at Northampton Bridge Street. In August 1916, a siding was laid at Hardingstone Junction for the construction of Northampton Power Station. The Power Station, which was commissioned in 1919, had its own rail facilities.

The line did not suffer from the weight restrictions applied on the Bedford to Hitchin Line and was worked for many years by Class 3Fs and 4Fs, and from time to time Black Fives and Class 8Fs were used. During its later years, the service generally comprised an Ivatt 2-6-2T with a two-coach LMS non-corridor suburban push-pull set, well-suited for working lightweight trains stopping frequently and requiring rapid acceleration. As the motive power used were based at Bedford, the locomotive was always at the Bedford end of the coaches to facilitate servicing, meaning that services were 'pushed' to Northampton and 'pulled' to Bedford or through to Hitchin. The Ivatt 2-6-2Ts were on occasion replaced by LMS Ivatt Class 4s and Standard Class 2 2-6-2Ts were also used.

The line's busiest period was during the war years. In August 1940 the LMS closed the down line between Olney and Turvey so that it could be used as a siding to store valuable war materials.

=== Decline and closure ===
Passenger numbers on the line were weak due in part to its failure to serve any sizeable community with the exception of Olney and in part to the inconvenient siting of stations. Piddington station was in fact closer to Horton than Piddington, while Turvey was a mile from the village it served due to the need to avoid Turvey Abbey and the River Great Ouse. In addition, both villages saw a decline in the number of their residents between 1901 and 1961. Patronage was declining at the time of the decision to close St John's although the line did see specials when there was horseracing at Towcester Racecourse. The specials ran via Bedford, Turvey, Olney and Ravenstone Wood Junction. During the Second World War, the line formed a useful cross-country link with well-filled passenger trains and freight routed via Bedford from Avonmouth. A Ministry of Defence depot in Piddington was opened in 1939 on the north side of the line to the east of the signal box.

Faced with the need to make economies following the end of the war, diesel railbuses were introduced in 1958 accompanied with an increase in service frequency to nine between Bedford and Northampton. Great efforts were made by the British Transport Commission to encourage passenger traffic and it was even proposed to construct a new halt at Newton Blossomville. However, as with the Bedford to Hitchin line, the railbuses, which frequently broke down, failed to reverse the Bedford to Northampton line's fortunes and, at a time when branches had to be shown to pay their way, income derived solely from schoolchildren and shoppers on market days was insufficient to ensure the line's survival. Steam services were reintroduced for the last months of the passenger service on the line which was withdrawn as from 5 March 1962, with the last very well patronised train running on Saturday 3 March. For a time, four Class 127 suburban DMUs were used for crew training on the line in preparation for their introduction on the Bedford to St Pancras line.

The route remained open to serve the MOD's Piddington depot but the line beyond Piddington to Oakley Junction on the Midland Main Line was closed on 20 January 1964 after branch goods traffic had ceased on 6 January. The 50-lever signal box at Oakley Junction, which had opened as a replacement for a previous box, closed on 10 May 1970. In February 1968, once the line's remaining traffic had ceased, the line from Hardingstone Junction in Northampton to Piddington was transferred to the Ministry of Defence which administered it until 1981. In October 1979, the Army provided a service for rail enthusiasts to travel between the Power Station and Piddington using an Army railbus. Tracklifting from Piddington was completed by 1986.

All that remained of the line was a short stretch south of Northampton to the Brackmills Industrial Estate. This section had been used for the supply of coal to Northampton Power Station until its closure in 1976. The site was subsequently used as a grain storage facility which used the rail facilities for grain transportation. Three Andrew Barclay diesel locomotives were used on site until the end of rail traffic in 1988. The track remained down to serve the rail plant manufacturer Geismar, the last customer for the line. Until 1994, Geismar used a yard at Claughton Road, in railway use since 1888, for the assembly and distribution of track panels. These however became redundant with the advent of continuous welded rail. In December 2005, Network Rail officially designated the section of line as "Out of Use". This was changed to "Out of Use (temporary)" in September 2009.

== Present and future ==
=== Route integrity ===
The formation is generally intact throughout the route, although most of the underbridges have been removed. The line only had one level crossing, which is still there at Brackmills.

=== Calls for reopening ===
In 2000, Capita Symonds was appointed by Connex as part of its unsuccessful bid for the Thameslink franchise. Capita carried out an engineering study into the possibility of reopening the line and concluded that the likely cost would be around £220m for a double-track line with a station at Olney. The cost was revised upwards to £275m in 2004. The Government Office for the East of England published a multi-modal study in 2003 recommending a new Bedford–Northampton line as part of an extension of Thameslink. The Bedfordshire Railway and Transport Association (BRTA), had called for the trackbed protection and advocated reopening since the Association's Inauguration in March 1997; as a part of its campaigning, it called on the government to include the reopening of the line as part of the West Coast Main Line modernisation. Reopening is also supported by the Milton Keynes Rail Link Supporters Forum, but not the Northampton Rail Users' Group (NRUG), which did not oppose it either. In May 2013 it was reported that the Bedfordshire Railway and Transport Association (BRTA) was seeking contributions towards the preparation of business case for the line, as well as liaising with local authorities with regard to the route of the line.

On a more limited basis, BRTA have suggested that a park and ride railway station be provided at Brackmills. In the light of local population growth, BRTA has suggested that a reopened line, including a station at Olney, would relieve the A428 road and promote tourism.

In December 2014, a Network Rail study stated that the reopening of the line "would provide a considerably shorter, and already partially electrified, cross country route to the West Midlands."

In January 2019, Campaign for Better Transport released a report identifying the line was listed as Priority 2 for reopening. Priority 2 is for those lines which require further development or a change in circumstances (such as housing developments).

In March 2021, a bid was submitted to restore the line as part of the third round of the Restoring Your Railway fund.

In March 2025, West Northamptonshire Council published its final Local Transport Plan which included an assessment of options for the rail corridor as a short-term goal (assessment to be completed by 2030). Proposed options include a segregated active travel path, mass transit options such as bus and light rail, potential extension to Great Houghton, and an assessment of the long term viability of fully reopening the railway.

In November 2026, the British Regional Transport Association sent a letter to Universal United Kingdom. The group are concerned about the effect that the new theme park, near Bedford, will have on road traffic. As such, they have requested that Universal assist in safeguarding the route and consider supporting its reinstatement. The group believes that this would be beneficial to the new theme park and the wider region, by reducing traffic and improving rail connectivity.

=== Disposal of the remaining trackbed ===
In October 2012, the Office of Rail Regulation gave its consent to the disposal of the remaining 1.8 mi (2.9 km) stretch of track between the A508 Cotton End (Bridge Street) in Northampton and Salthouse Road on the Brackmills Industrial Estate. The decision was made on the basis that there was "no obvious potential for freight traffic and no viable plans for passenger traffic", adding that the route could be converted to provide a "sustainable transport green corridor" such as a guided busway or a walkway/cyclepath. The consent could allow the West Northamptonshire Development Corporation (WNDC) to purchase the trackbed as part of a larger proposed scheme which would see the adjoining power station site redeveloped as the new riverside campus of the University of Northampton. On 21 October 2013, it was announced that WNDC had purchased the section of disused line for £1.5m to create a cycle and pedestrian path.

In February 2014 it was reported that the projected decommissioning by Network Rail of the line between Northampton station and the A428 Bedford Road in October 2014 would enable the construction of a link road between the two separated halves of St James Mill Road in Northampton, thereby connecting St James with the A5123 Towcester Road and providing a direct link from Towcester Road to the Sixfields Stadium and M1 Motorway junctions 15A and 16. The decommissioning of the line would mean that the expense of a rail overbridge could be avoided. In August 2015, the disused tracks across Cotton End (hist. Bridge Street level crossing) in Cotton End were removed and the road resurfaced. In April 2018, the plans to build the link road were approved by Northampton Borough Council; the project will be part-funded by SEMLEP, however Northampton Borough Council was dissolved in 2021 and SEMLEP was dissolved in 2024.

== Images ==
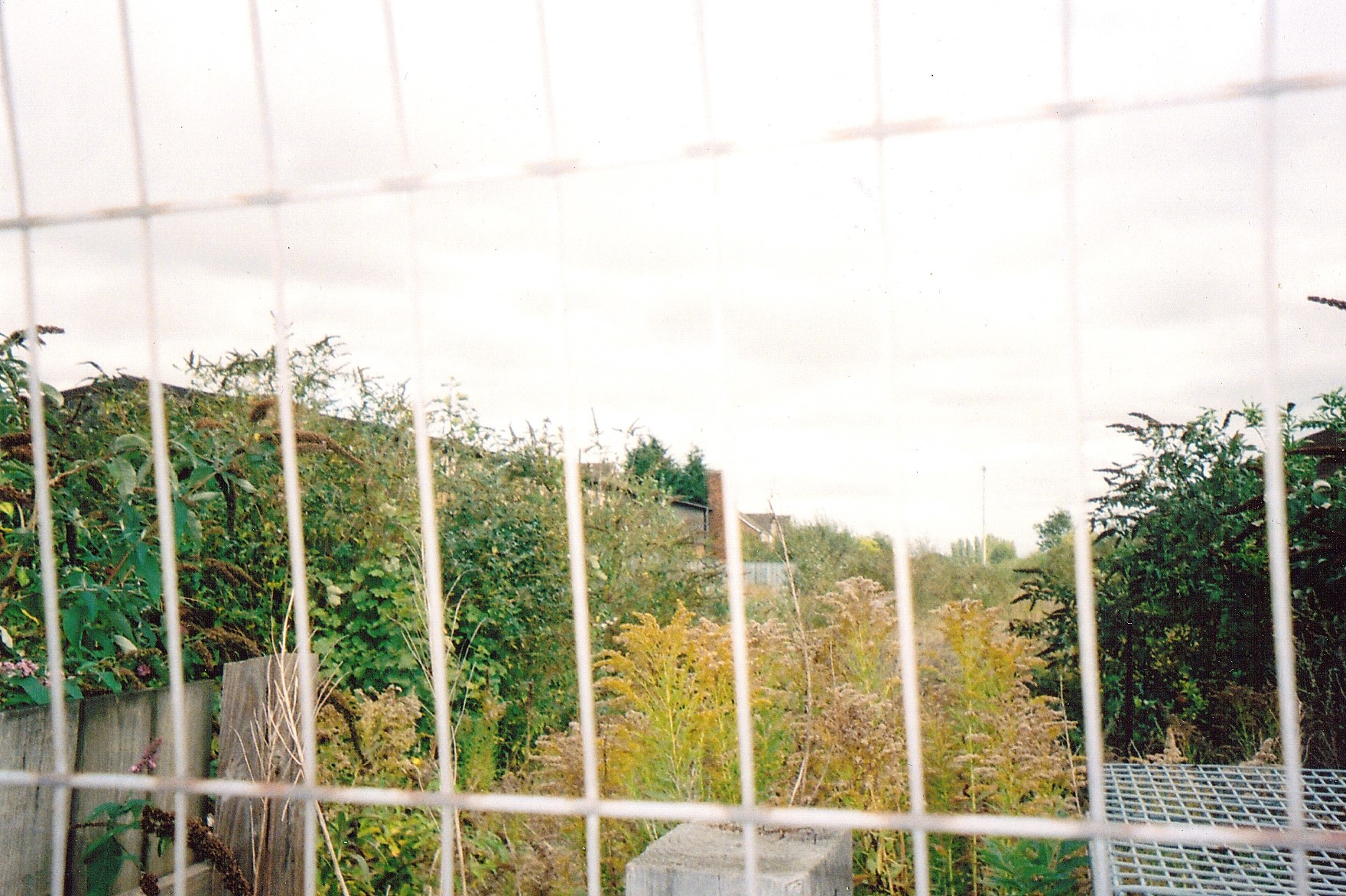
Northampton Bridge Street Station in September 2013

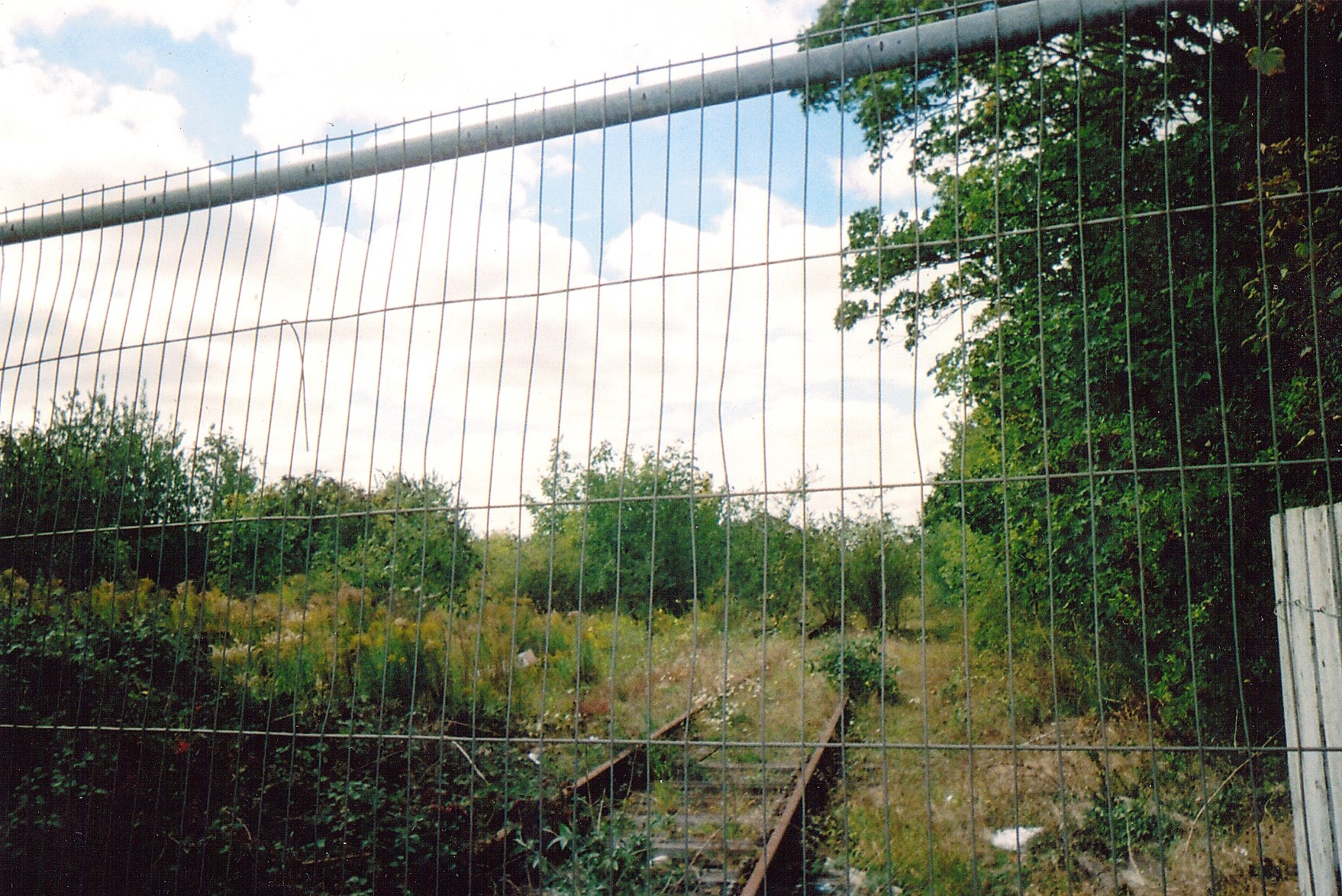
Northampton Bridge Street station in September 2013

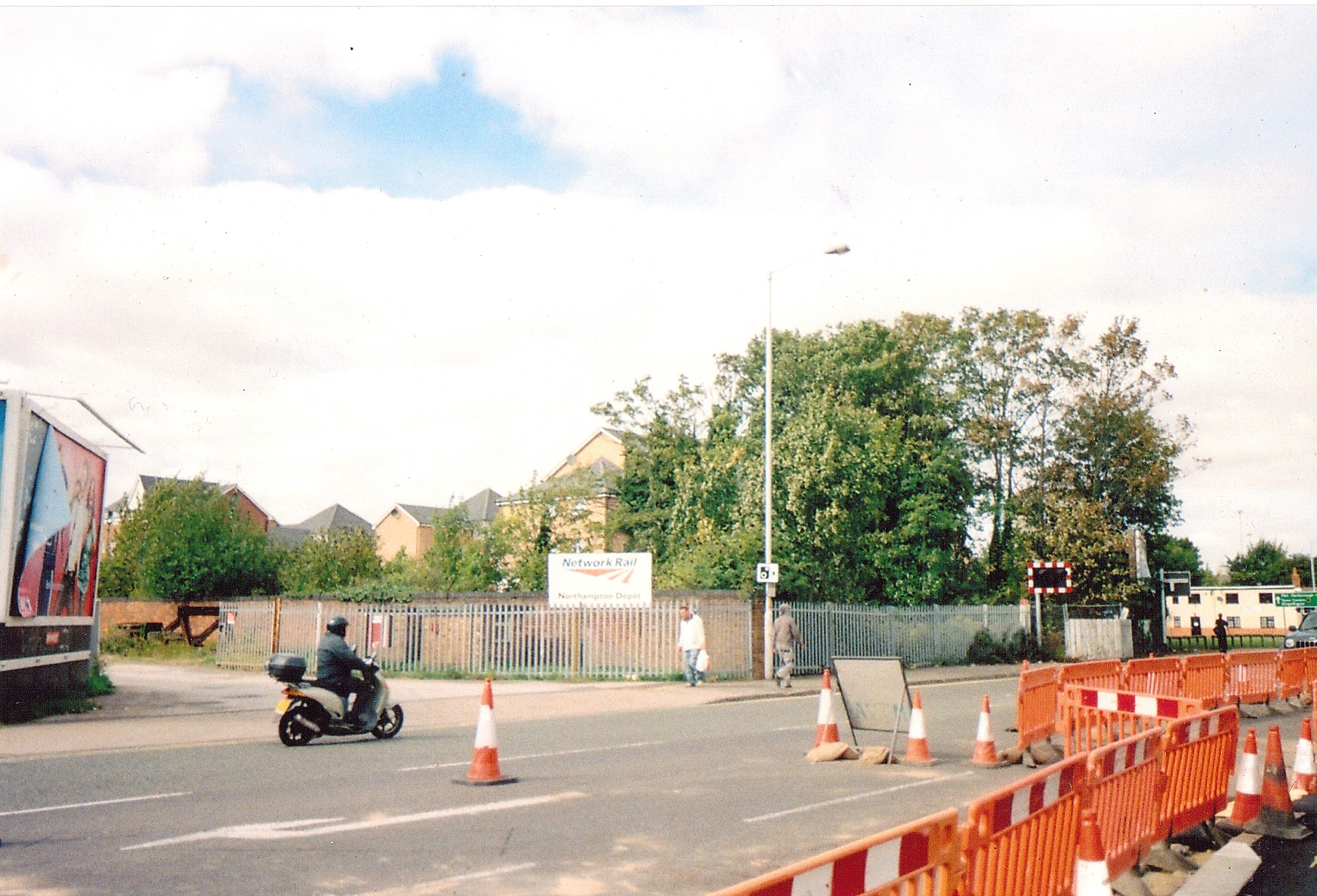
Northampton's near by Network Rail Pomfret Arms close-Bridge Street depot in September 2013.
