= Northampton railway station =

Railway station in Northamptonshire, England

Coordinates: 52.2383°N 0.9071°W

Northampton
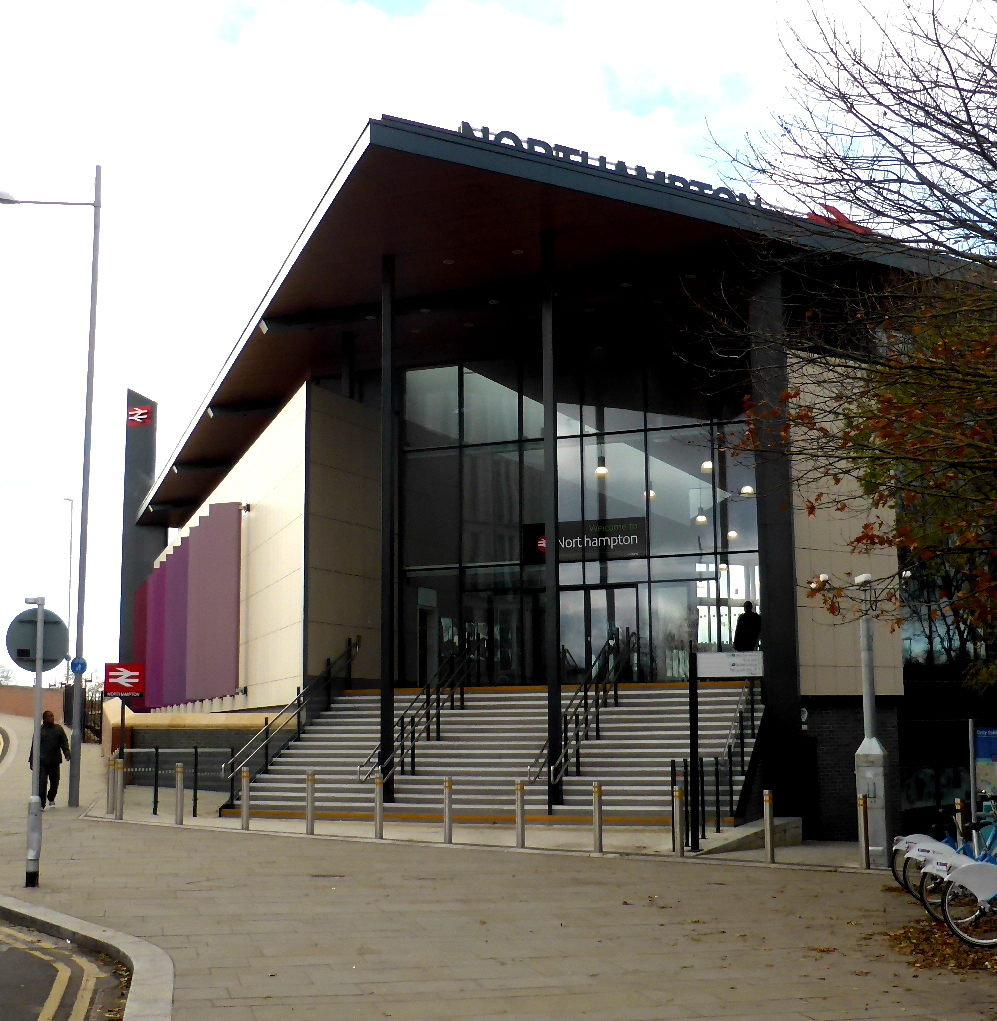
- Station entrance in November 2016

General information
- Location: Northampton, West Northamptonshire; England
- Grid reference: SP747604
- Manager: London Northwestern Railway
- Platforms: 5

Other information
- Station code: NMP
- Classification: DfT category C1

History
- Original company: London and North Western Railway
- Post-grouping: London, Midland and Scottish Railway; London Midland Region of British Railways

Key dates
- 16 February 1859: Opened as Northampton Castle
- 1880–1881: Rebuilt
- 1965–66: Remodelled
- 27 September 1965: Closure of motive power depot
- 18 April 1966: Renamed Northampton
- 12 January 2015: New station building opened

Passengers
- 2021/22: ▲1.869 million
- 2022/23: ▲2.407 million
- 2023/24: ▲2.628 million
- 2024/25: ▲2.847 million
- 2025/26: ▲2.872 million
Location
Notes
- Passenger statistics from the Office of Rail and Road

Northampton railway station serves the market town of Northampton in Northamptonshire, England. It is on the Northampton Loop of the West Coast Main Line and is located 65 miles 68 chains (65.85 miles; 106.0 km) from London Euston. The station is served by London Northwestern Railway services between London Euston and Birmingham New Street; there is also a limited direct service to Crewe. A handful of Avanti West Coast services also serve the station, but these have been greatly reduced due to the longer-term impact of the COVID-19 pandemic in the United Kingdom. It is the busiest station in Northamptonshire, and the fourth busiest station in the East Midlands.

The station was known as Northampton Castle until 1966, as it is built on the site of the former castle of the same name. A proposed reinstatement of the Northampton Castle name following redevelopment of the station in 2015 did not take place.

== History ==
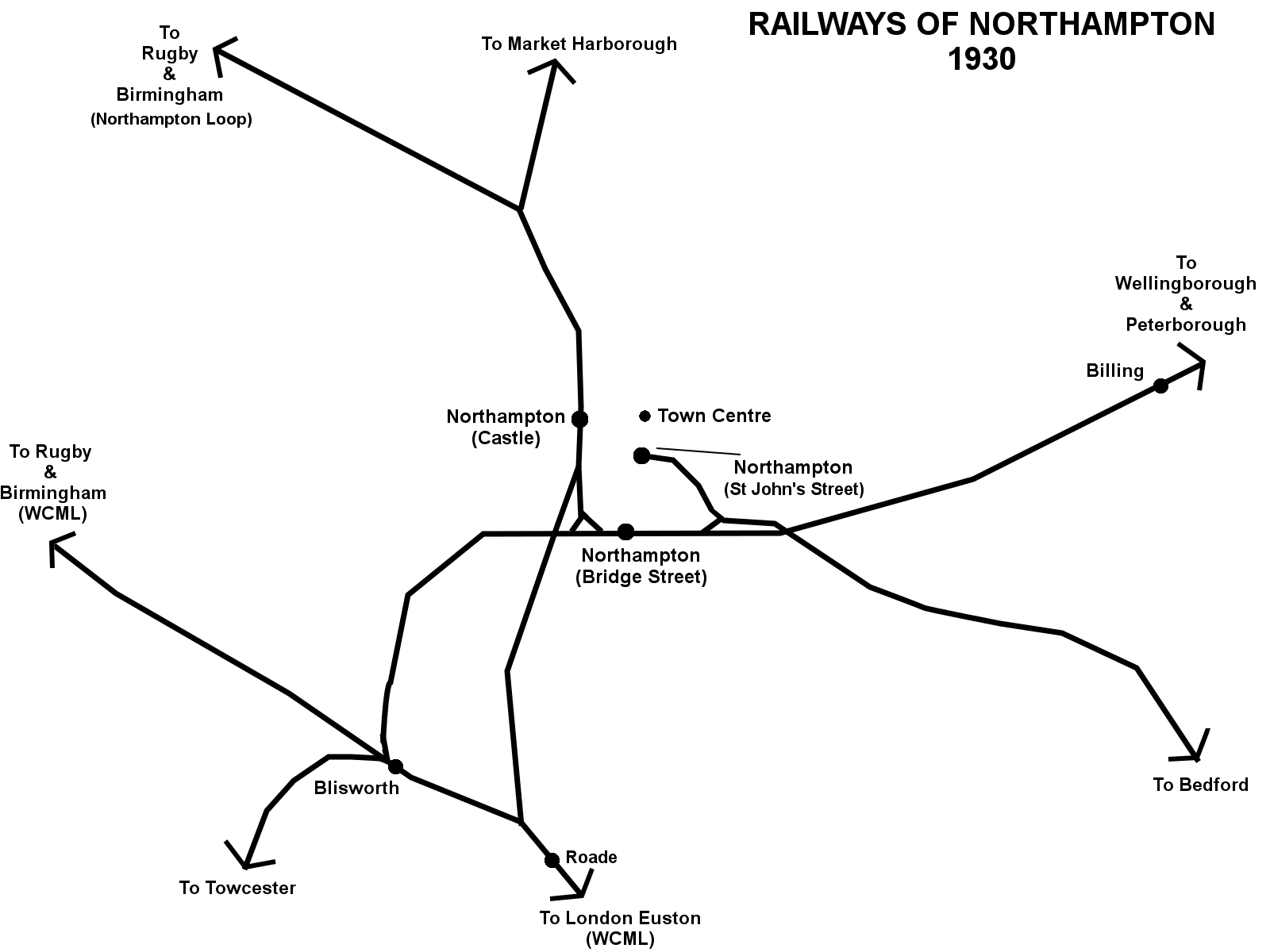
Railways in the vicinity of Northampton in 1930

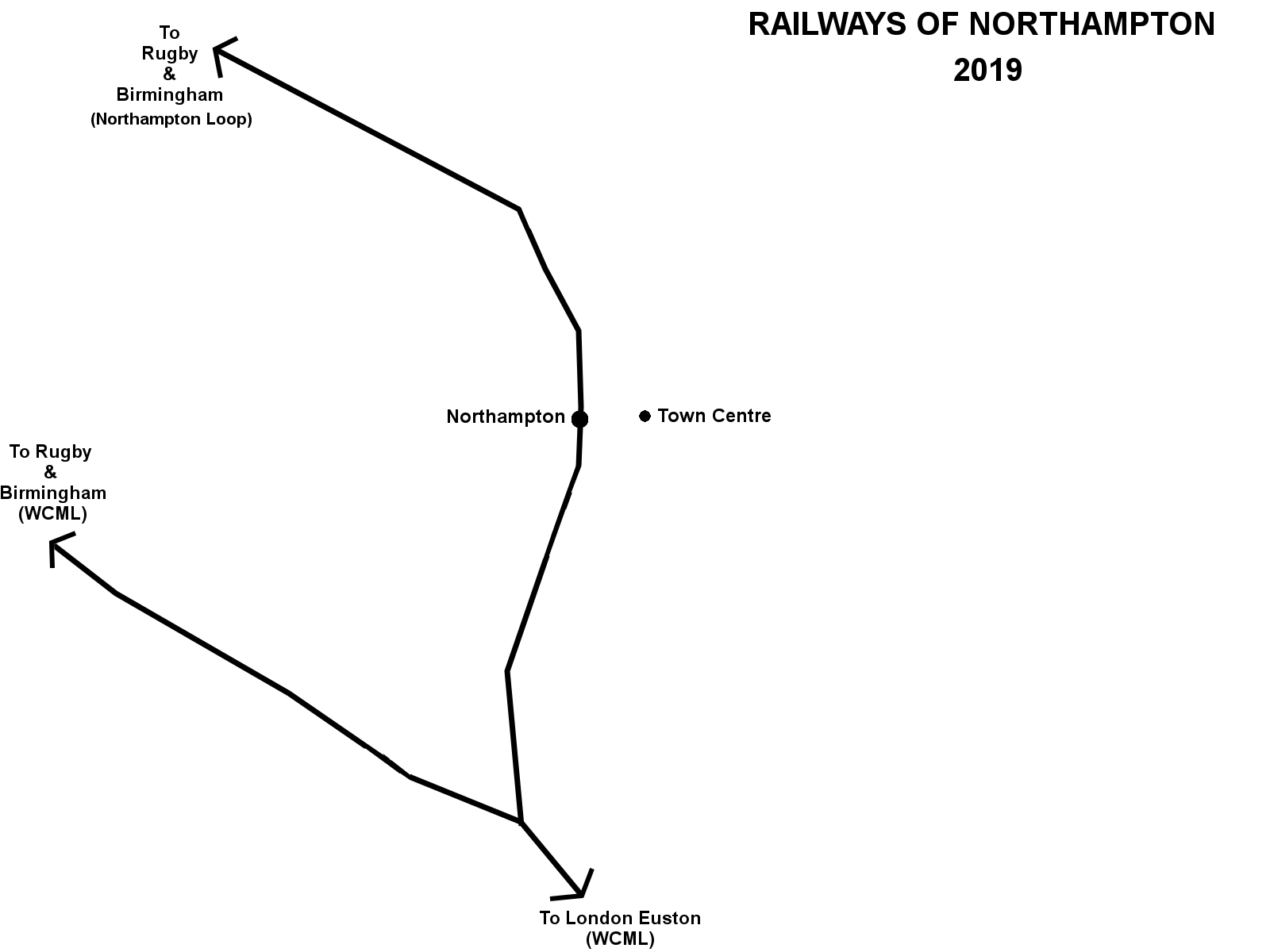
Railways in the vicinity of Northampton in 2019

At one time, there were three railway stations in Northampton: Northampton Bridge Street, Northampton St. John's Street and Northampton Castle. The latter survives as the town's only station.

=== The railway reaches Northampton ===
Although the promoters of the London and Birmingham Railway had considered routes passing close to Northampton in 1830, the town was skirted by the final choice of alignment via Blisworth and the loop line to remedy this had to wait for several decades. The decision to omit Northampton was not due to local opposition but rather engineering decisions taken by the railway company's engineer Robert Stephenson. The 120 ft (37 m) difference in elevation in the 4 mi (6.4 km) between Blisworth and Northampton, on the floor of the Nene Valley, is likely to have played a key role in the decision. Robert Stephenson is reported to have said that he could easily get trains into the town but not out again. As a result, Northampton lost out as a commercial centre to towns such as Leicester which had better transport links. The town was considered as the southern terminus of the Midland Counties Railway in 1833 but lost out to Rugby on account of the shorter distance to Leicester.

Bridge Street station on the Northampton and Peterborough Railway from Blisworth to Peterborough East was thus the first station in Northampton, opening on 13 May 1845.

=== 1858 station ===
Following the discovery of a large quantity of ironstone in Northamptonshire in 1851, a proposal was made by the London and North Western Railway (L&NWR) for an 18 mi (29 km) line from Market Harborough to Northampton which received Parliamentary approval in 1853. The line's terminus in Northampton was to be on part of the old orchard of Northampton Castle which had been purchased in 1852 by the Reverend Havilland de Sausmarez, the absentee Rector of the Parish of St Peter, as the site of a new rectory. The L&NWR agreed to purchase the land for £5,250, to complete the parsonage and to rent it back to the Reverend. Tenders were advertised for the line in 1858 and the lowest offer of £81,637 by Richard Dunkley of Blisworth was accepted. The contractor had been an unsuccessful bidder for the contract to build Bridge Street station. Dunkley was also the successful tenderer for the line's stations, including Castle station at a cost of £612.

It would be the most basic structure on the line with no goods facilities, limited passenger waiting accommodation and an awning over the single platform. Goods traffic was to be dealt with at Bridge Street. The station opened with the line on 16 February 1859. It was described in the L&NWR's minutes as a "very unassuming edifice", giving the impression that it was "merely temporary in nature" until traffic developed to a sufficient level to allow a "more imposing" structure to be built.

=== 1880–81 rebuilding ===
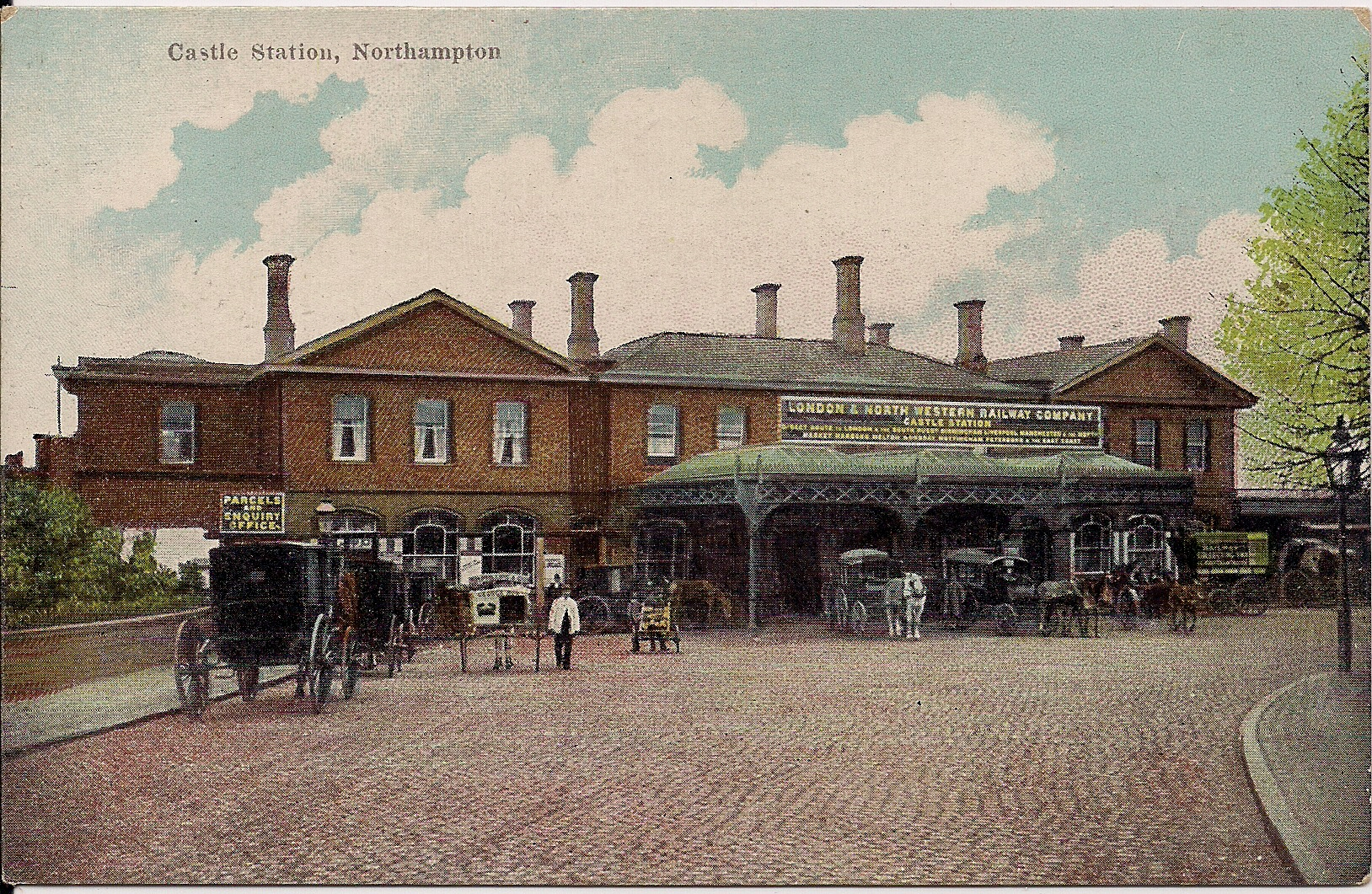
1900s postcard of the exterior of Castle station.

The advent of the Great Northern and London and North Western Joint Railway to tap the coalfields of Nottinghamshire and Yorkshire led the L&NWR to quadruple its main line between Bletchley and Rugby and also to consider ways in which Northampton might be better served. In 1875, the L&NWR obtained powers to quadruple the main line north from Bletchley to Roade, with the two new tracks (the "slow lines") diverging at Roade so as to form a new line (the Northampton Loop) through Northampton. The result of these works would be to put Northampton on an important coal artery from Nottingham and the North to the L&NWR's Camden goods depot.

Additional land would have to be purchased at Castle station to allow for expanded passenger facilities and goods facilities. Owing to the proximity of the River Nene, the only way this could be done was to expand onto the site of Northampton Castle. On 18 December 1876, the L&NWR purchased the site from William Walker and subsequently demolished the remains of the castle except for the postern gate which, following a local petition, was moved to a new site in the boundary wall of the new station where it remains to this day. £30,000 was allowed by the L&NWR board for the improvement of passenger facilities and a goods shed was constructed on the site of the castle in 1880. The rebuilt station opened with the Loop Line north to Rugby on 1 December 1881 followed by the line south to Roade on 3 April 1882. It comprised three through platforms and five terminal bays. Platform 1, which was sited on the east side of the running lines, was considered as the main up platform; it had two adjoining bay platforms, numbered 2 and 3. Platforms 4 and 5 were located at the south end of platform 1, while the two sides of an island platform on the down side of the station were platforms 6 and 7. A further down bay platform was situated at the north end of platform 6, along with other bays and loading docks for parcels and sundries traffic.

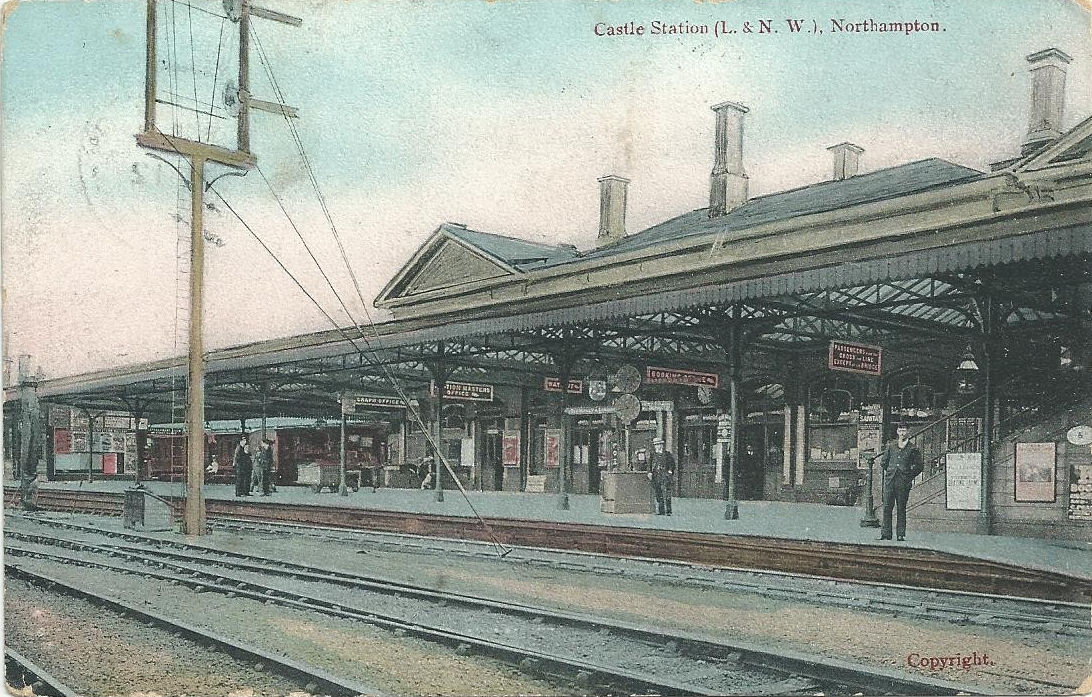
Northampton Castle station

The main station building, a two-storey structure in the Italianate style, was located on the up side and consisted of a central block with two cross-wings. The wings had gable roofs, whereas the central part had a low-pitched hipped roof. Two standard L&NWR signal cabins were positioned to the north and south of the platforms, these being known respectively as Northampton No. 1 and No. 2 boxes. Other signal cabins, Northampton No. 3 and No. 4, were sited further north and controlled extensive marshalling yards. A fifth cabin at Duston West Junction lay to the south-west; it controlled the apex of the Northampton triangle. No. 2 was the largest signal cabin with 118 levers which controlled the country end of the station, access to the goods shed and the south end of the goods yard.

=== Modern times ===
==== Line closures ====
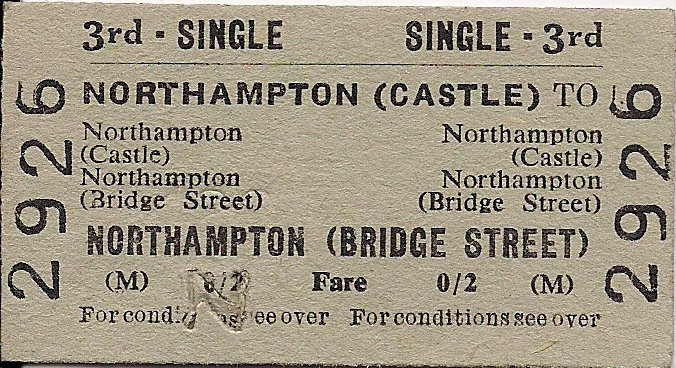
Castle to Bridge Street ticket from 1957

No further significant changes took place prior to nationalisation except for an increase in the number of sidings at the station. One notable change was the traffic diverted from Northampton St John's, following its closure in 1939.

Closures accelerated under British Railways with the withdrawal of services from Bridge Street station, which lost much if not all of its significance following the opening of the Loop, on 4 May 1964 when the Northampton to Peterborough line was closed, leaving only Castle station serving the town. As a result, Castle station was renamed Northampton on 18 April 1966. In addition, the bay platforms 4 and 5 were removed and the area converted into an overflow car park. The Great Northern and London and North Western Joint Line closed to all passenger traffic except for a workmen's service on 7 December 1953; the workmen's service between Market Harborough and East Norton ended on 20 May 1957. The section between Welham Junction and Marefield North Junction closed in November 1963, followed by the Rugby and Stamford Railway on 6 June 1966. The line to Market Harborough closed on 15 August 1981.

==== 1965–66 remodelling ====
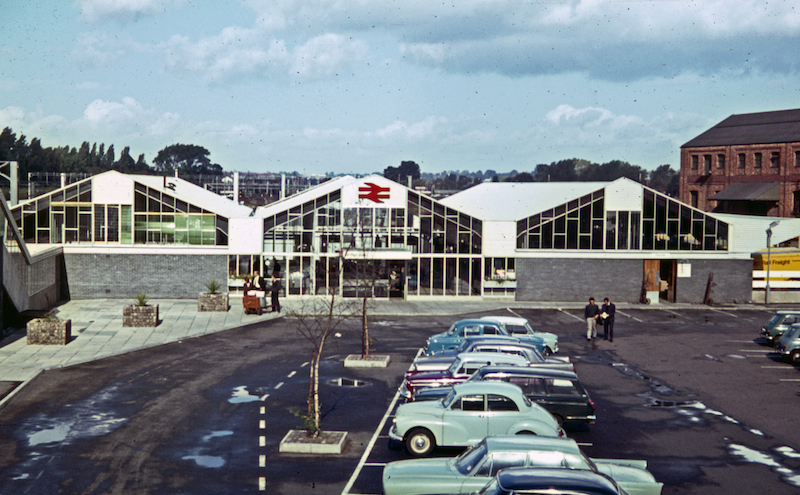
Frontage of the rebuilt 1960s station in October 1967

The station was chosen by British Rail for complete rebuilding in 1965–66 to designs by the architect Ray Moorcroft, as part of the electrification of the West Coast Main Line between Euston and Liverpool. The Victorian station was demolished to be replaced by new structures which were described as "three cowsheds bolted together" and as being of "questionable architectural merit". The station layout remained unchanged: three long through platforms and a number of terminal bays. Standard colour-light signalling was installed in the area but control was not centralised. The current was switched on for the first time between Hillmorton Junction to Northampton on 6 June 1965 for insulation tests, with steam locomotives being withdrawn from the area on 27 September 1965.

==== 2013–14 rebuilding ====
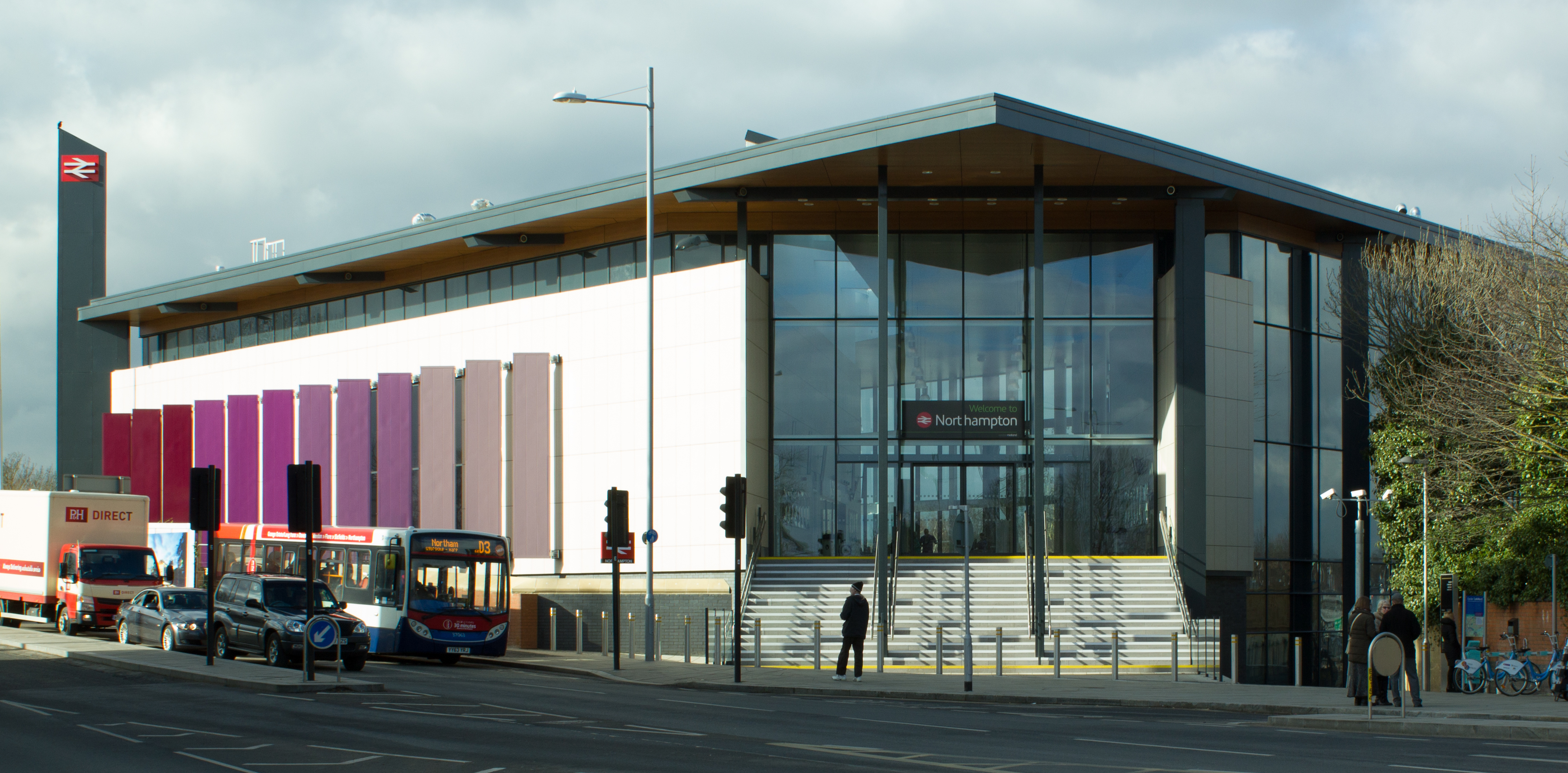
Frontage of the new Northampton station, opened in January 2015

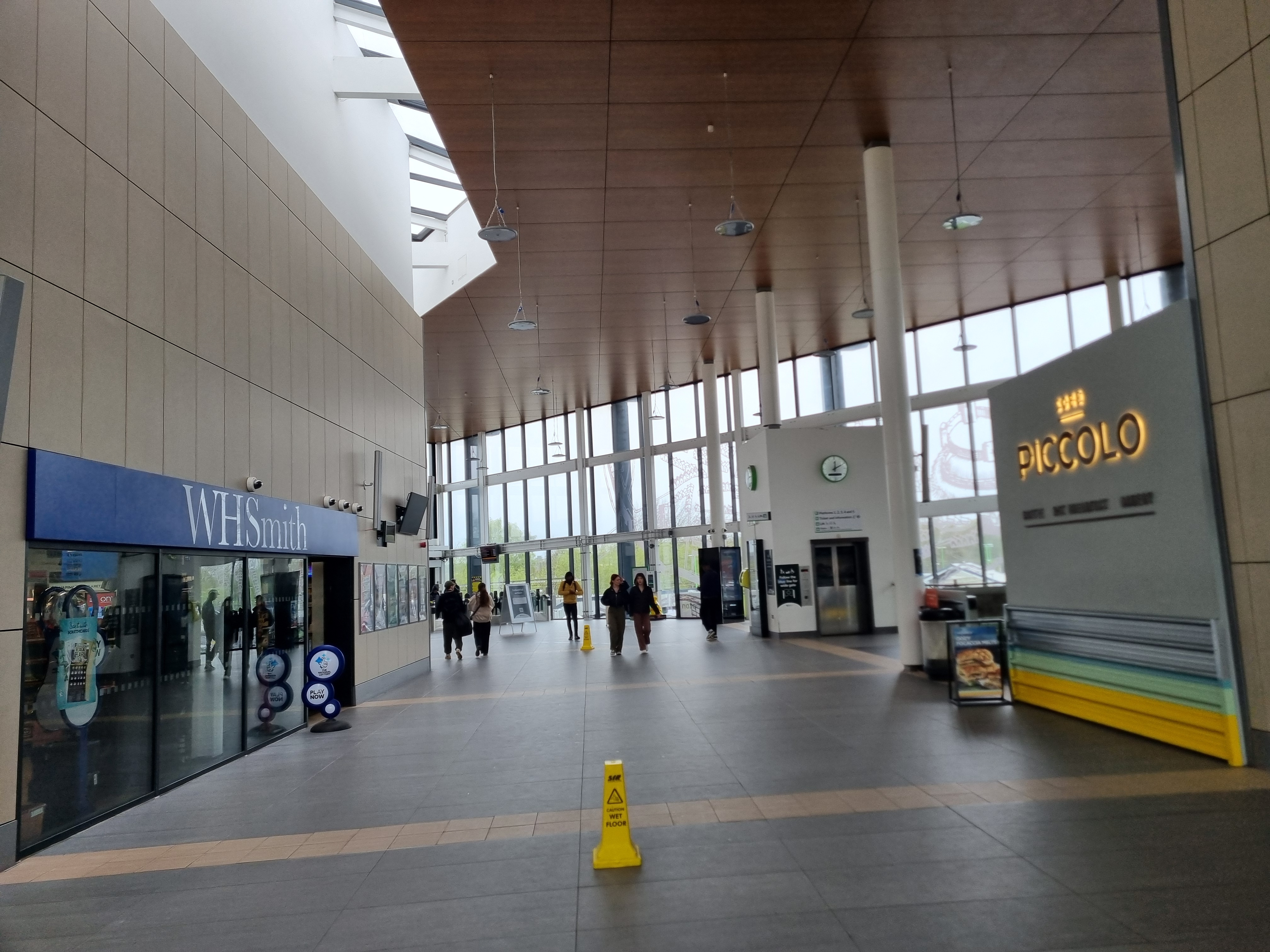
Inside of new Northampton station in 2024

By the late 2000s, the station had become inadequate for the size of the town which it served and the 2.5 million passengers who used it each year. Following the designation of Northampton Waterside as an enterprise zone in August 2011, plans to replace the existing station with a new two-storey glass and steel structure were approved by the West Northamptonshire Development Corporation.

The redevelopment included a new 2,500 m^{2} (27,000 sq ft) station building (nearly twice the size of the existing one), a new 1,270 space multi-storey car park, new footbridge and platform canopies, new approach roads and associated junction improvements, as well as a 28,000 m^{2} (300,000 sq ft) commercial development. Funding for the new station was agreed in May 2012 when the coalition government agreed to provide £10m, with the remaining £10m coming from Network Rail and Northamptonshire County Council. Construction work began in August 2013. Construction work was preceded by a three-month archaeological excavation by a team of specialists from the Northampton office of MOLA on the footprint of the new station building. They uncovered remains of late Saxon activity pre-dating the construction of Northampton Castle, including a Saxon brooch, a medieval harness, pottery and animal bones.

After a three-month delay due to snagging issues, the new station opened on 12 January 2015, with the old station closing after the last train at 02:43. The new station building opened on 19 January 2015, with the demolition of the old station building having been completed in the meantime and replaced by a taxi point and cycle area. In December 2021, West Northamptonshire Council approved plans for a 1,198 multi-storey car park to replace the station's decked parking area; the Council would take a 40-year lease on the car park and retain the income generated by it. The plans did not proceed due to the impact of COVID-19, the Russian invasion of Ukraine and cost inflation, resulting in the Council reaching agreement in June 2023 with Network Rail and its development partner on the delivery of the car park.

==== Proposed renaming ====
Northamptonshire County Council proposed reinstating the name Northampton Castle in recognition of the site's history. The change, reported to cost £200,000, did not take place.

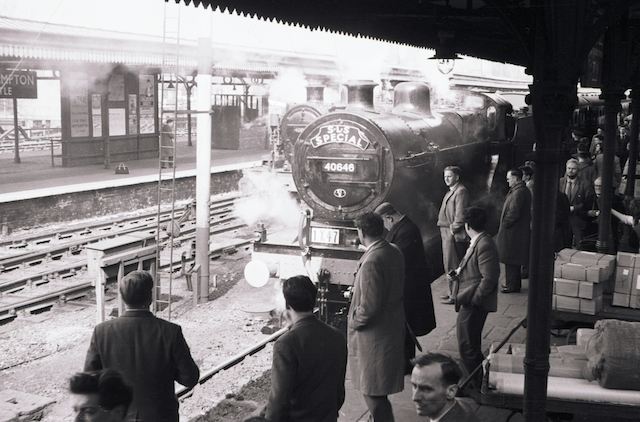
A SLS special calls on 14 April 1962, before 1965 remodelling

== Facilities ==
The station has toilets, a newsagent, coffee shops and a car hire office. As part of the re-development in 2015, there were proposals to build a multi-storey car park with direct access to the station; in June 2020 it was suggested that this will be put in place "in the not-too-distant future."

== Services ==
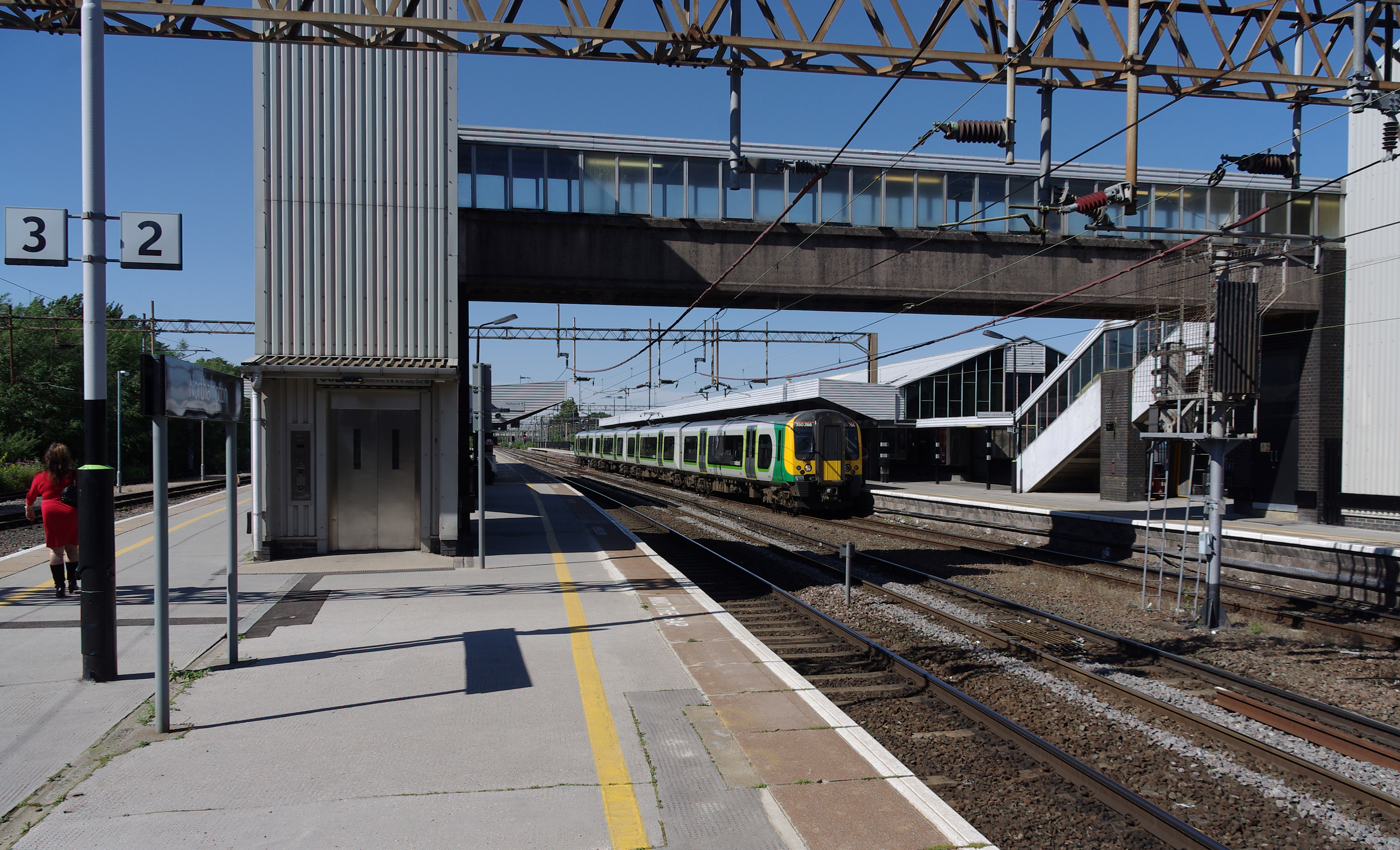
A Class 350/2 EMU no. 350266 in old London Midland livery on London Midland service to London Euston at Northampton on platform 1 in July 2012, prior to its rebuilding

Northampton is served by two train operating companies:

=== West Midlands Trains ===
West Midlands Trains, under the brand name London Northwestern Railway, operates services between London Euston and Birmingham New Street. WMT maintain their fleet of Class 350 EMUs at the Siemens Mobility depot, just to the north of the station; they also operate a train crew depot at the station.

The typical Monday-Saturday off-peak service consists of three trains per hour in each direction, with two services per hour on Sundays.

The majority of services along the Trent Valley Line to Crewe, via Nuneaton and Stafford, run on the faster, more direct route between Milton Keynes Central and Rugby; this arises from London Midland's decision to run 110 mph regional services on the main spine of the West Coast Main Line. Passengers wishing to travel from Northampton to Crewe now have to change at Rugby; however, there are still a small number of daily direct Crewe services in the mornings, except on Sundays.

=== Avanti West Coast ===
Avanti West Coast operates one train per early weekday morning to London Euston that stops here; this service originates from Edinburgh Waverley. No northbound Avanti West Coast services are timetabled to stop at Northampton. The lack of intercity services at Northampton is because the town is on a loop line away from the main spine of the West Coast Main Line. Connections to Glasgow Central, Manchester Piccadilly and other long-distance destinations can be made by changing at Milton Keynes Central, Rugby or Birmingham New Street.

| Preceding station | National Rail | Following station |
|---|---|---|
| Long Buckby towards Birmingham New Street | London Northwestern Railway London–Birmingham | Wolverton towards London Euston |
| Rugby | Avanti West Coast; North West/Scotland – Birmingham New Street – London Euston (limited) | Milton Keynes Central or London Euston |
| | Disused railways | |
| Pitsford and Brampton; Line open and station open (Heritage Railway) | London and North Western Railway; Northampton to Market Harborough line | Northampton Bridge; Street; Line and station closed |
| Terminus | London, Midland and Scottish Railway; Bedford to Northampton Line | Piddington; Line and station closed |
| | Historical railways | |
| Church Brampton; Line open, station closed | London and North Western Railway; Northampton Loop | Roade; Line open, station closed |

== Accidents and incidents ==
- On 27 April 1989, a passenger train hauled by Class 85 locomotive 85 102 was derailed south of the station.

== Traction maintenance facilities ==
=== Steam motive power depots ===
For several years after 1849, engines were stabled in the open on a siding set aside for this purpose. The first shed was a wooden structure opened in c. 1850 by the London and Birmingham Railway which was blown down in 1852. A brick built replacement was provided in 1855, which was later enlarged in 1870 to receive extra locomotives from Wolverton shed which closed in 1874. In 1881, a large ten-road replacement shed was constructed in the triangle of lines to the south of the station, with the 1855 shed used subsequently for carriage storage. This shed, which was often referred to as Bridge Street, was located near the Grand Union Canal and could accommodate 50 locomotives. Measuring 228 ft × 132 ft (69 m × 40 m) with a 42 ft (13 m) turntable, the shed was initially coded as No. 5 and became No. 6 on the opening of Bescot. For administrative purposes, it was merged with Colwick motive power depot upon the grouping and both remained under the control of the same shed foreman until Colwick's closure in 1932. Northampton was coded 2C in 1935, when it was merged with Rugby depot; it was recoded 1H by British Railways in December 1963.

Initially 16 locomotives were allocated to Northampton shed in the 1860s, a figure which had risen to 36 by 1925 despite receiving the allocation of the ex-Midland shed at Hardingstone Lane in 1924. The stock level rose under British Railways when it comprised 8Fs, 4Fs and LNWR 0-8-0s for freight workings, 'Black Fives', 2-6-2Ts and 4-4-0s for passenger services, while a few 3Fs and a single Webb 2-4-2T were used for shunting.

A rearrangement of the offices and stores took place in 1927 under the London, Midland and Scottish Railway at a cost of nearly £1,000; the roof was also replaced by one with a 'louvre' pattern. A new 60 ft (18 m) turntable was installed in 1938 by the south-east corner of the building. Further modernisation took place in 1952 when ash and coaling plants were erected by British Railways, together with a new 70,000 imp gal (320,000 L) structure. The shed was closed, along with Willesden shed, as from 27 September 1965, a consequence of the electrification of the West Coast Main Line.

=== Kings Heath depot ===
To the north of the station is Northampton Kings Heath Siemens Depot, a five-road rolling stock maintenance depot which was officially opened on 27 June 2006 by Derek Twigg, Under-Secretary of State in the Department for Transport. Built at a cost £31m, it was constructed on a long, narrow strip of land previously the site of overgrown railway sidings. The depot is responsible for West Midlands Trains' Class 350 fleet. In addition, maintenance of Class 321s was transferred to the depot following the closure of Bletchley traction depot in 2008.

== Sources ==
- Adams, Will (2012). Northamptonshire – Part 1: South and West. British Railways Past and Present. Kettering: Past & Present Publishing. ISBN 978-1-85895-284-0. No. 65.
- Butt, R. V. J. (October 1995). The Directory of Railway Stations: details every public and private passenger station, halt, platform and stopping place, past and present (1st ed.). Sparkford: Patrick Stephens Ltd. ISBN 978-1-85260-508-7. OCLC 60251199. OL 11956311M.
- Clinker, C. R. (1988) [1978]. Clinker's Register of Closed Passenger Stations and Goods Depots in England, Scotland and Wales 1830–1980 (2nd ed.). Bristol: Avon-Anglia Publications & Services. ISBN 978-0-905466-91-0. OCLC 655703233.
- Engel, Matthew (2009). Eleven Minutes Late: A train journey into the soul of Britain. London: Macmillan. ISBN 978-0-230-70898-3.
- Gough, John (1984). The Northampton & Harborough Line. Oakham: Railway and Canal Historical Society. ISBN 0-901461-35-0.
- Griffiths, Roger (1999). The directory of British engine sheds and principal locomotive servicing points: 1. Oxford: OPC. ISBN 0860935426.
- Hatley, Victor (1959). "Northampton Re-vindicated: More light on Why the Main Line Missed the Town". Northamptonshire Past and Present. II (6): 305–309. OL 22383432M.
- Hawkins, Chris; Reeve, George (1981). LMS Engine Sheds: The L&NWR. Vol. 1. Upper Bucklebury: Wild Swan. ISBN 0-906867-02-9.
- Jenkins, Stanley C. (April 2016). "Steam days at Northampton". Steam Days (320): 15–28.
- Kingscott, Geoffrey (2008). Lost Railways of Northamptonshire. Newbury, Berkshire: Countryside Books. ISBN 978-1-84674-108-1.
- Leleux, Robin (1984) [1976]. A Regional History of the Railways of Great Britain: The East Midlands. Vol. 9. Newton Abbot, Devon: David St. John Thomas. ISBN 978-0-946537-06-8.
- Milner, Chris; Banks, Chris (2001) [1991]. The East Midlands. British Railways Past and Present. Kettering: Past & Present Publishing. ISBN 978-1-85895-112-6. No. 10.
- Mitchell, Victor E.; Smith, Keith A. (June 2007). Bletchley to Rugby (including Newport Pagnell and Northampton). Midhurst, West Sussex: Middleton Press. ISBN 978-1-906008-07-9.
- Quick, Michael (2009) [2001]. Railway passenger stations in Great Britain: a chronology (4th ed.). Oxford: Railway & Canal Historical Society. ISBN 978-0-901461-57-5. OCLC 612226077.
- Wake, Joan (1935). Northampton Vindicated or Why the Main Line Missed the Town. Northampton: Joan Wake. ASIN B0018GPKOQ.
