= Turvey railway station =

Former railway station in England

Coordinates: 52.1588°N 0.5975°W

Turvey
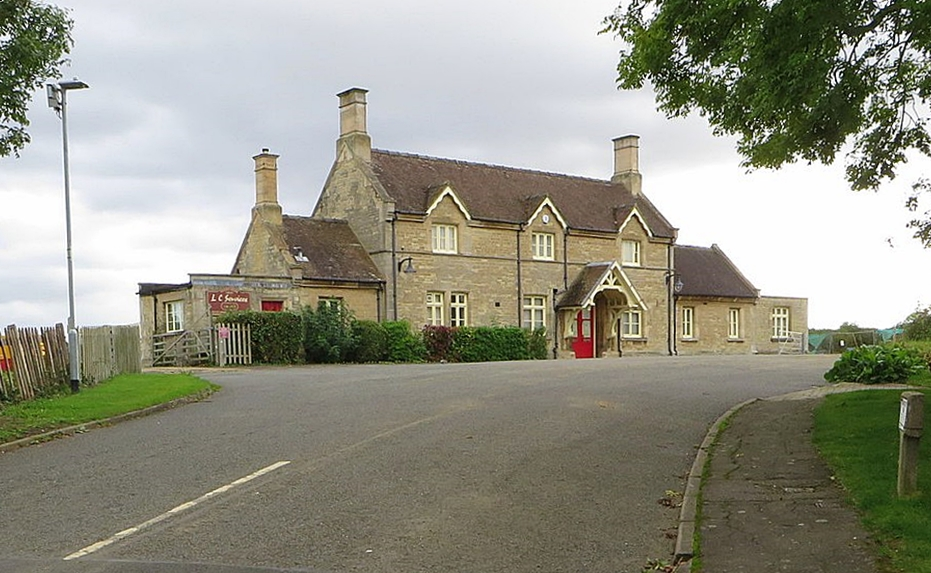

General information
- Location: Turvey, Bedford; England
- Grid reference: SP960521
- Platforms: 2

Other information
- Status: Disused

History
- Original company: Bedford and Northampton Railway
- Pre-grouping: Midland Railway
- Post-grouping: London Midland and Scottish Railway; London Midland Region of British Railways

Key dates
- 10 June 1872: Opened
- 5 March 1962: Closed to passengers
- 6 January 1964: Goods facilities withdrawn
Location

Turvey was a railway station on the Bedford to Northampton Line which served the village of Turvey from 1872 to 1962.

== History ==
Opened by the Bedford and Northampton Railway on 10 June 1872, the station was a mile from the village of Turvey. This was a result of the decision to route the line to the south of Turvey in order to avoid Turvey Abbey and the River Great Ouse. The station was therefore sited near the main road away from the village. However, a small hamlet developed around the station, including a public house called The Railway Inn. An attractive stone building was provided with two platforms. Two sidings looped from the Up line to reach a small goods yard, while a further siding just to the north served cattle pens. A signal box stood at the Olney end of the Down platform. Five trains each way ran on weekdays and none on Sundays.

Serving a rural district with only 782 residents in 1901, traffic was light. With the introduction of local bus services, passenger bookings fell from 13,207 in 1913 to 7,989 in 1922. Closure of the station to passenger traffic came on 5 March 1962, leaving the goods yard to remain open for freight until 6 January 1964. In its final years, the station saw few passengers.

Preceding station	Disused railways	Following station
Olney; Line and station closed	Midland Railway; Bedford to Northampton Line	Bedford Midland; Line closed, station open

== Present day ==
The platforms have been demolished but the station building remains as offices used by LC Services Ltd which has redeveloped the rest of the site
