= Piddington railway station =

Former railway station in Northamptonshire, England

Coordinates: 52.1877°N 0.7891°W

Piddington
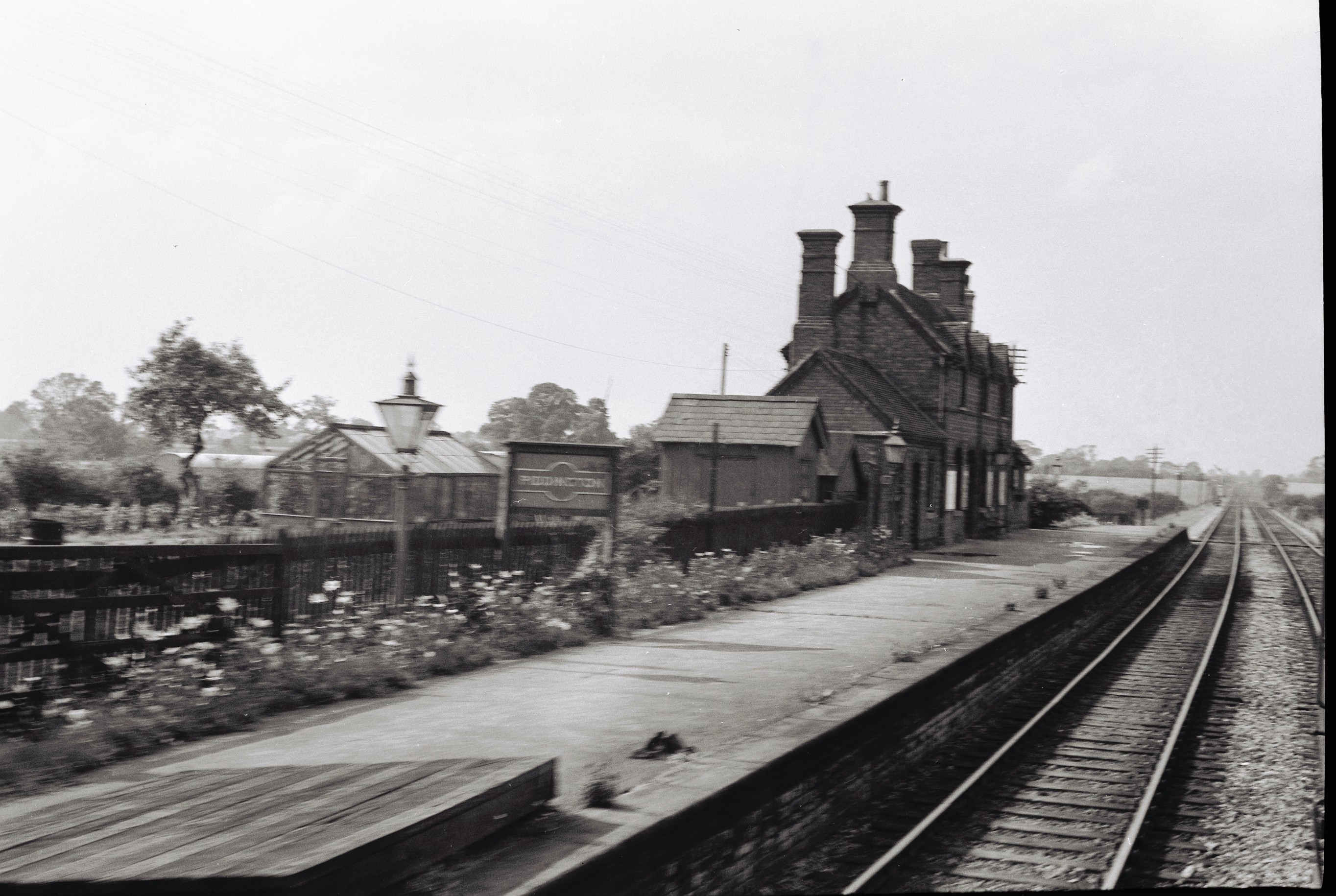
- The station in the 1950s

General information
- Location: Horton, West Northamptonshire; England
- Platforms: 2

Other information
- Status: Disused

History
- Original company: Bedford & Northampton Railway
- Pre-grouping: Midland Railway
- Post-grouping: London Midland and Scottish Railway; London Midland Region of British Railways

Key dates
- 10 June 1872: Opened as Horton
- 1 May 1876: Renamed Piddington & Horton
- 1 April 1904: Renamed Piddington
- 5 March 1962: Closed to passengers
- 7 September 1964: Goods facilities withdrawn
Location

Piddington was a railway station on the former Bedford to Northampton Line. Despite its name, the station was located close to the village of Horton in Northamptonshire, approximately 2 miles (3.2 km) from the village of Piddington.

== History ==
The line and station were opened in 1872 and operated by the Midland Railway which became part of the London Midland and Scottish Railway in 1923. The line closed to passengers in 1962. Until 1939 the western end of the line was at Northampton St Johns Street Station.That station closed in 1939 and the trains were diverted into Northampton Bridge Street Station and from there they ran into Northampton Castle Station.

For a short while from December 1892, Piddington and Horton were also served by the Stratford-upon-Avon and Midland Junction Railway, known as the "SMJR", with a station called Salcey Forest to the south west of Horton and south east of Piddington. This line ran from Towcester to Ravenstone Wood Junction on the Northampton to Bedford line between Piddington and Olney stations via Blisworth and Stoke Bruerne. There were connections from Towcester to Banbury and Stratford upon Avon.

== Routes ==
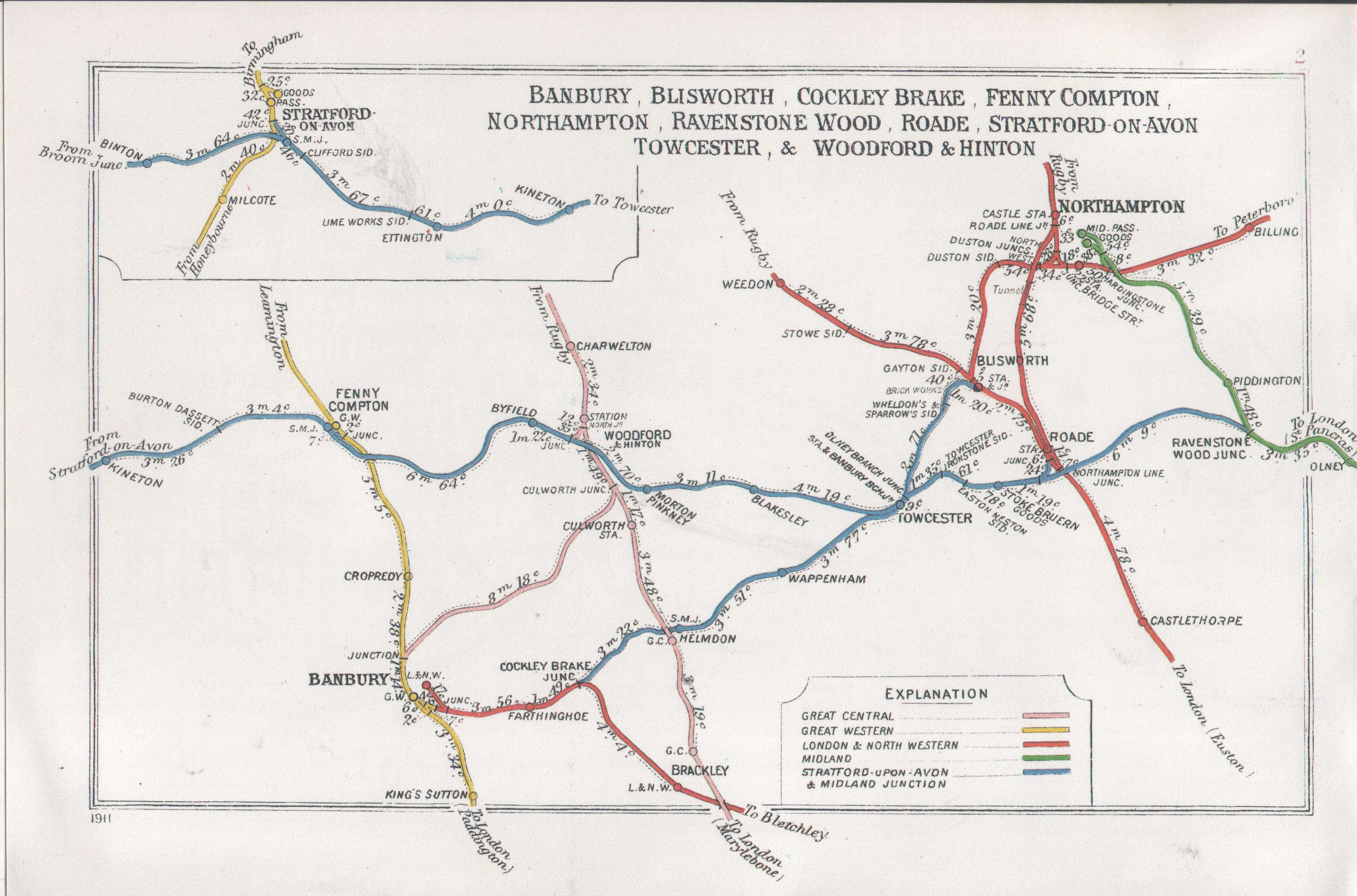
A 1911 Railway Clearing House map of railways in the vicinity of Piddington (far right, in green)

| Preceding station | Disused railways | Following station |
|---|---|---|
| Northampton; St. John's Street | London, Midland and Scottish Railway; Bedford to Northampton Line | Olney |

== Present day ==
The station can be found off the B526 in Horton village. The route of the line is just to the northeast of the village. There is a proposal to reopen this line. Confusion sometimes occurs as there is a disused railway line close to Piddington itself, however that is the former Stratford and Midland Junction Railway, which had no station at Piddington or Horton except Salcey Forest referred to above.
