= Northampton Power Station =

Former electricity generating station

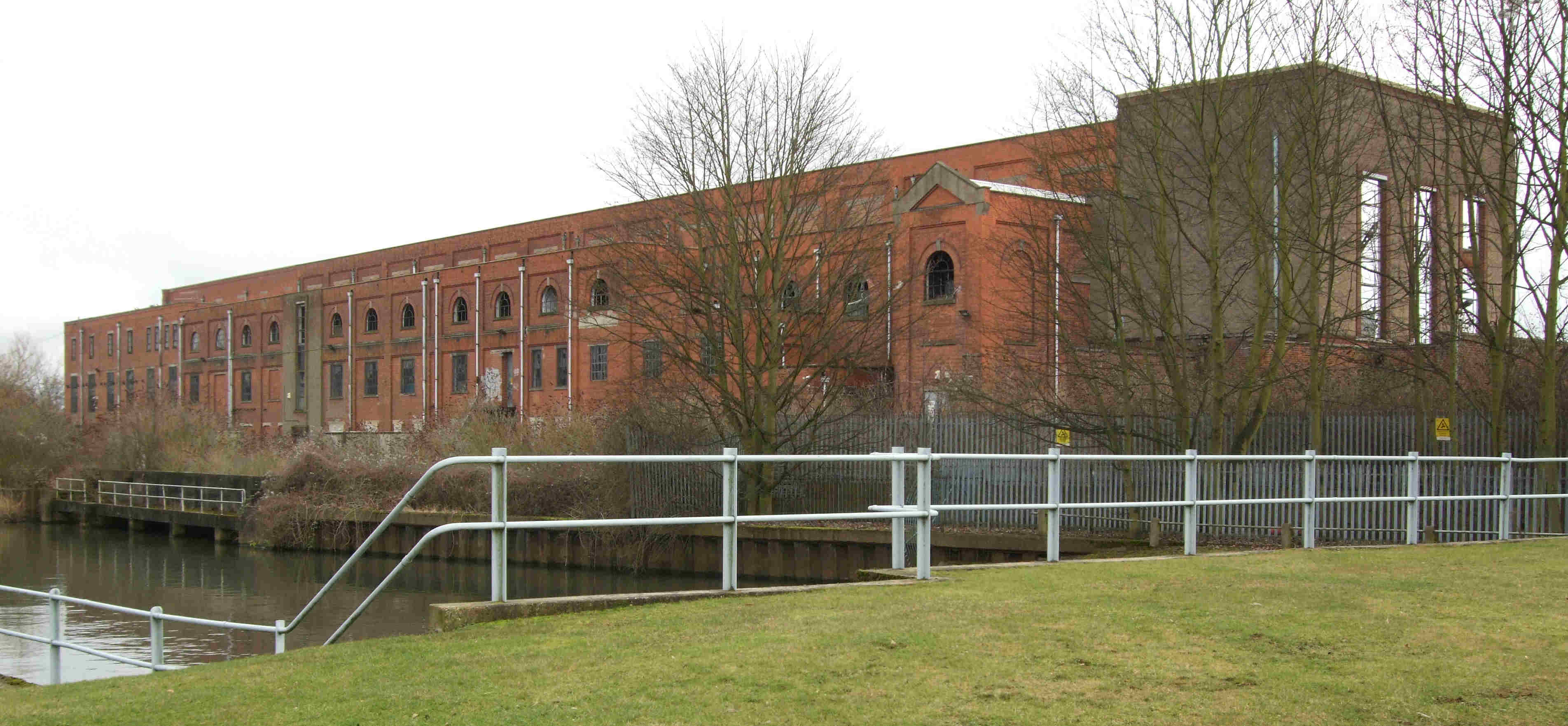
- Northampton Power Station; Derelict turbine hall on 16 February 2010
- Country: England
- Location: Northamptonshire, East Midlands
- Coordinates: 52.23116°N 0.88577°W
- Status: Decommissioned and demolished
- Construction began: (1890: Bridge Street), 1916
- Commission date: (1891: Bridge Street), 1919
- Decommission date: 1976
- Owner: As operator
- Operators: The Northampton Electric Light and Power Company (1889–1948); British Electricity Authority (1948–1955); Central Electricity Authority (1955–1957); Central Electricity Generating Board (1958–1976)

Thermal power station
- Primary fuel: Coal
- Turbine technology: Steam turbines and reciprocating engines
- Cooling towers: 2

Power generation
- Make and model: C.A. Parsons and Metropolitan Vickers
- Units decommissioned: all
- Nameplate capacity: 6.84 MW (1923), 31.2 MW (1931), 102 MW (1958)
- Annual net output: (See table and graph below)

External links
- Commons: Related media on Commons

Northampton power station (also known as Nunn Mills power station or Hardingstone Junction power station) was an electricity generating station in Northampton, Northamptonshire, England, which began operation for the Northampton Electric Light and Power Company Limited (NELPC) in 1919 and generated power until closure in 1976.

The redundant power station buildings were used as a grain storage facility in the late 1970s. Using both the road and rail facilities on site for transportation of grain.

The power station was finally demolished in around 2015 to make way for the relocation of the University of Northampton close to the town centre. This was completed in 2018 and is now known as the Waterside Campus.

== Location ==
The power station was located on the south bank of the River Nene just south-east of the town centre. It was also known as Nunn Mills power station being the name of a mill located on that part of the river, though none of the mill seems to remain. It was also known as Hardingstone Junction power station named after the nearby railway junction of that name. Two large concrete cooling towers east of the main turbine halls were demolished shortly after closure. However, the derelict and graffiti covered main buildings were still standing 37 years later in 2012. A large storage area for coal was located east of the generating plant and delivered by rail using a branch of the Northampton to Bedford railway line.

== History ==
The Northampton Electric Light and Power Company Limited was established in April 1889 and the supply of current began on 11 March 1891 from Bridge Street power station (52°14′09″N 0°53′47″W) in Northampton town centre.

In 1897 the plant had a generating capacity of 425 kW and the maximum load was 182 kW. A total of 114.676 MWh of electricity was sold which provided an income to the company of £3,032-2-7. The growth in electricity supply is demonstrated in the table.

Number of 8 candle power lamps
Year	Lamps
1893	4,600
1894	5,300
1895	6,130
1896	8,014
1897	11,084

In 1904 the Northampton Corporation planned to purchase the undertaking but negotiations failed, however, it was noted that the local authority were satisfied with the service the company were providing. Electricity supplies were initially limited to the centre of Northampton but an extension order in 1904 gave the company powers to extend supplies outside the borough.

=== Hardingstone Junction power station ===
By 1913 the growth in demand for electricity was such that the company sought to build a new generating station at Hardingstone Junction. Work on the new station began in 1916 and operation began in 1919.

By 1923 the company operated both power stations. The Bridge Street station generated Direct Current electricity. The plant at Bridge Street comprised 2 × 220 kW, 1 × 400 kW and 2 × 600 kW reciprocating engines and generators and 1 × 300 kW turbo-alternator, a total of 2,340 kW. These were supplied with up to 57,000 pounds per hour (7.18 kg/s) of steam from coal-fired boilers.

The Hardingstone Junction/Nunn Mills power station generated alternating current and comprised 1 × 500 kW, 1 × 1,000 kW and 1 × 3,000 kW turbo-alternators supplied with up to 86,200 lb/hr (10.86 kg/s) of steam from coal-fired boilers.

The total amount of electricity generated in 1923 was 10.947 GWh and there were 13,575 connections to the system. The amount of electricity sold was 8.468 GWh producing a revenue of £94,255. The surplus revenue over expenses was £58,457.

=== New plant 1926–1956 ===
From 1926 to 1929, a new low pressure plant was installed at Hardingstone Junction, this was followed by an intermediate pressure plant in 1936-52 and a high pressure plant in 1956. By 1959 the plant comprised the following.

Boilers:

- 2 × 45,000 lb/hr (5.67 kg/s) Stirling boilers, 210 psi at 650 °F (14.48 bar at 343 °C)
- 2 × 60,000 lb/hr (7.56 kg/s) Stirling boilers, 210 psi at 700 °F (14.48 bat at 371 °C)
- 4 × 150,000 lb/hr (18.90 kg/s) Stirling boilers, 425 psi at 810 °F (29.31 bar at 432 °C)
- 2 × 175,000 lb/hr (22.05 kg/s) Simon Carves boilers, 425 psi at 825 °F (29.31 bar at 441 °C)
- 2 × 150,000 lb/hr (18.90 kg/s) Bennis boilers, 625 psi at 860 °F (43.1 bar at 460 °C)

Turbo-alternators:

- 1 × 10 MW Metropolitan Vickers
- 1 × 12.5 MW Metropolitan Vickers
- 3 × 30 MW Parsons
- 1 × 30 MW Brush

Cooling water was abstracted from the River Nene, there was also one Mouchel and one Moss concrete cooling towers, each had a capacity of 2 million gallons per hour (2.53 m^{3}/s) with a cooling range of 20 °F (11 °C).

In 1926 the station was supplying electricity to the railway works at Wolverton, now part of Milton Keynes.

The company continued to expand its area of supply. For example, in 1927 there was 144 miles of high-tension lines and 108 miles low-tension distribution mains. These supplied electricity to Bletchley (20 miles from Northampton), Stony Stratford, Towcester and Long Buckby and intermediate villages. By 1936 there were 566 miles of high voltage lines, and 414 miles of low voltage distribution mains.

At the end of the 1930s the electricity supply arrangements for Northampton were unusual. Outside of London all towns with a population of over 60,000 were supplied by municipally owned electricity undertakings. Northampton, Newcastle and Bournemouth were the only exceptions where company undertakings supplied electricity.

=== Nationalisation ===
The Electricity Act 1947 nationalised the electricity industry and established the British Electricity Authority, which became the Central Electricity Authority (CEA) in 1955. The BEA took over the electricity generating capability of the NELPC and promoted efficient generation, transmission and distribution and cheaper prices in rural areas. It also standardised the system and electrical fittings and had 11 divisions and 12 area boards. The electricity distribution and sales part of the NELPC became part of the East Midlands Electricity Board (EMEB). The CEA was in turn dissolved by the Electricity Act 1957 and replaced by the Central Electricity Generating Board (CEGB) and the Electricity Council.

The generating capacity, electricity output and thermal efficiency were as shown in the table.

Northampton power station electricity capacity and output
Year	Net generating capability, MW	Electricity supplied, GWh	Thermal efficiency, %
1923	6.84	10.95	
1928		26.5	
1931	31.5	44.5	
1935		97.5	
1936		116.0	
1938		107.331	
1939		108.0	
1944		181.0	
1945		176.0	
1946		225.68	20.07
1954	102	297.895	21.78
1955	102	359.069	22.39
1956	102	319.976	22.12
1957	102	308.059	22.22
1958	102	243.227	22.40
1961	130	259.511	21.58
1962	143	252.07	22.0
1963	143	358.168	21.41
1967	143	315.22	20.58
1972	120.5	173.249	19.72

Electricity output from Northampton power station, in GWh

In 1958 the Northampton electricity district supplied an area of 201 square miles and a population of 144,000. The amount of electricity sold and the number and types of consumers was as follows:

Type of Consumer	No. of consumers	Electricity sold, MWh
Domestic	46,638	69,482
Commercial	5,283	30,026
Farms	613	6,034
Industrial	661	71,872
Public lighting	50	2,029
Total	53,245	179,437

The power station was closed on 25 October 1976.

== Redevelopment ==
The site was designated for redevelopment as housing for several years but remained an eyesore next to the modern Avon Cosmetics offices. In May 2012, the University of Northampton announced plans to establish a new riverside campus in Northampton town centre on the power station site. The site would be within the Northampton Waterside Enterprise Zone (known simply as Northampton Waterside).

On 18 December 2013, Northampton Borough Council granted outline planning permission for the £330m development of the town centre campus. An application for full planning permission was lodged in 2014 by the university, which has 14,500 students. The campus welcomed its first students in September 2018.

== See also ==
- Timeline of the UK electricity supply industry
- List of power stations in England
- List of pre-nationalisation UK electric power companies
- Public electricity supplier
- National Grid (UK)
