= Northampton St. John's Street railway station =

Former railway station in Northamptonshire, England

Coordinates: 52.2349°N 0.8955°W

Northampton St. John's Street
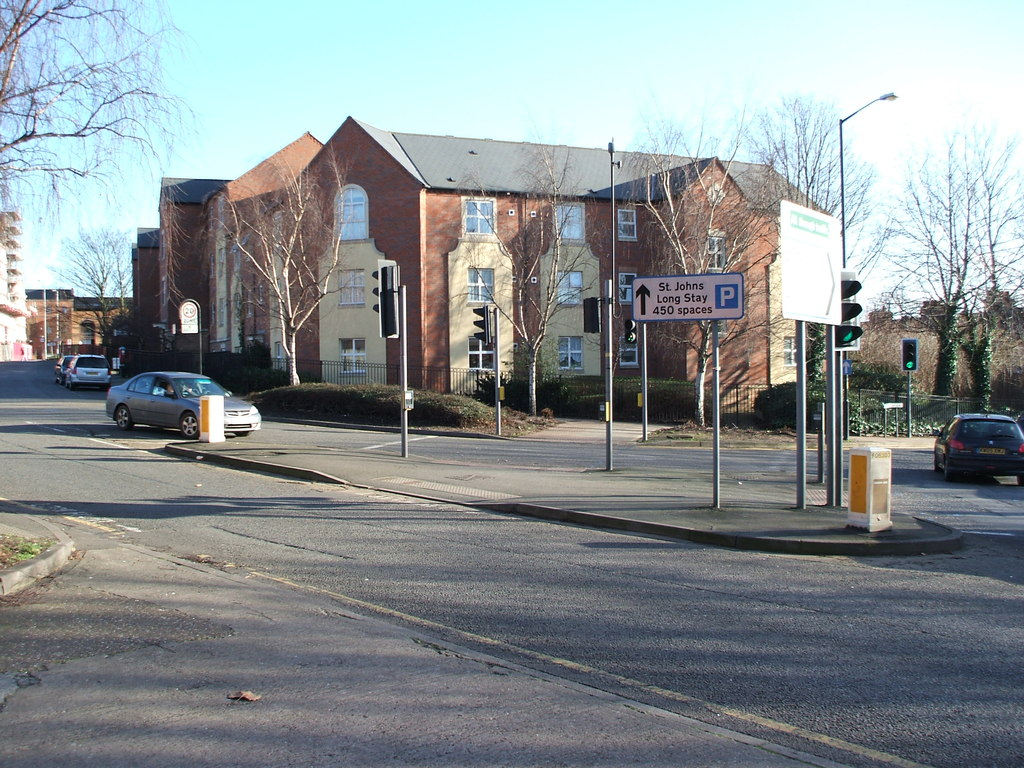
- The site of the station in January 2007

General information
- Location: Northampton, Northamptonshire; England
- Grid reference: SP755601
- Platforms: 2

Other information
- Status: Disused

History
- Original company: Bedford & Northampton Railway
- Pre-grouping: Midland Railway
- Post-grouping: London Midland and Scottish Railway

Key dates
- 10 June 1872: Opened as Northampton
- 2 June 1924: Renamed Northampton St. John's Street
- 3 July 1939: Closed
Location

Northampton St. John's Street was a railway station and the northern terminus of the Midland Railway's former Bedford to Northampton Line which served the town of Northampton in Northamptonshire, England from 1872 to 1939. Its closure came about as a cost-cutting measure implemented by the London, Midland and Scottish Railway which diverted services to the nearby Northampton Castle station. After closure the elegant station building was used as offices and the line for the storage of rolling stock; the site was cleared in 1960 to make way for a car park. The car park has now been built on and is the location of St Johns Halls of Residence for The University of Northampton.

== History ==
In 1871, the Midland Railway purchased a plot of land within the grounds of the former St. John's Priory near the centre of Northampton where it was to build the northern terminus of its line from Bedford to Northampton. The plot was bounded on its north by St. John's Street and to the south by Victoria Gardens leading to Cattle Market Road. The station was a large elegant building of a light sandy-coloured limestone was constructed above street level on red brick arches with retaining walls which carried the line above Cattle Market Road as it meandered southwards past Northampton Cattle Market and then across the River Nene. An imposing train shed covered the central part of the two platforms. No passenger footbridge was provided, and so passengers crossed the line using a barrow crossing or a footpath going behind the signal box located on the down side of the line just beyond Cattle Market Road bridge.

Six passenger services ran daily from Northampton to Bedford, the first train departing at 0615 and the last at 1952; the journey time was around 40 minutes. A service also ran to Wellingborough, 30 minutes being taken to cover the 12 mile distance. The station did not see any freight services as these were run to the Midland's separate goods station located near Bridge Street station. In 1923, the Midland Railway became part of the London, Midland and Scottish Railway and in July 1939 it was decided to close St. John's as a cost-cutting measure. Services were switched to Castle station via Hardingstone junction. Following closure, the lines leading into the old station were used for a number of years as sidings and the storage of rolling stock. In 1948, the station building was converted into offices and were finally demolished in 1960 to make way for a car park.

=== Stationmasters ===
From 1925 the station master was in charge of all three stations in Northampton.

- C. Barnes 1872 - 1875
- James Yaxley 1875 - 1883 (afterwards station master at Bath)
- Richard Henry Tabbern 1883 - 1919
- J.T. Bentham 1920 - 1925 (formerly station master at Hereford)
- John Tompkins 1925 - 1928 (afterwards station master at Coventry)
- J.T. Bentham 1928 - 1931
- F.C. O’Connor 1932 - 1937 (afterwards station master at Sheffield)
- Henry Preston 1937 - 1939

== Routes ==
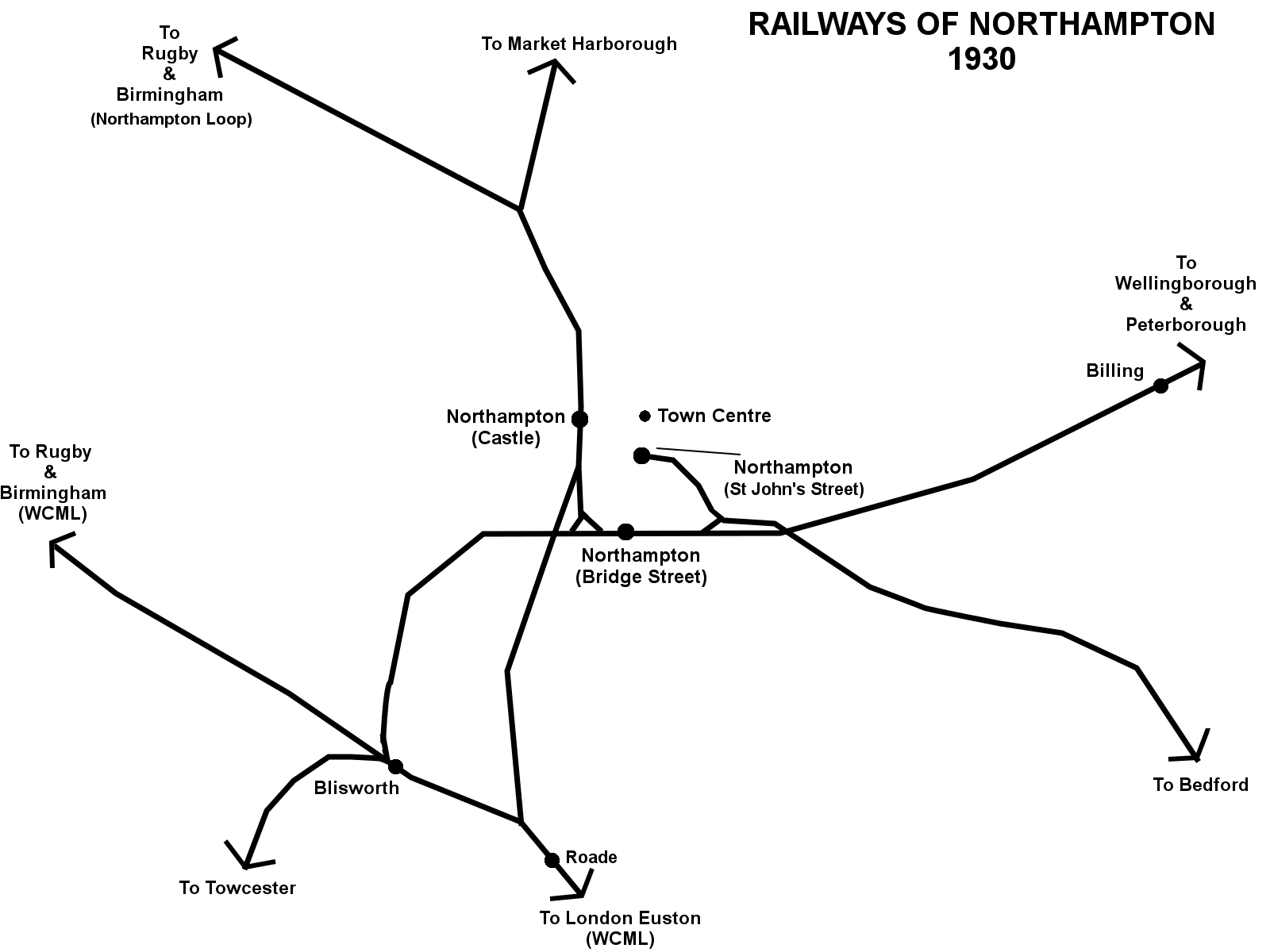
Map of railways in the vicinity of Northampton in 1930

| Preceding station | Disused railways | Following station |
|---|---|---|
| Terminus | London, Midland and Scottish Railway; Bedford to Northampton Line | Piddington; Line and station closed |
| Terminus | London and North Western Railway; Northampton and Peterborough Railway | Billing; Line and station closed |

== Present day ==
The station site is now the location for the St Johns Hall of Residence for the University of Northampton. Also nearby is a pedestrian walk way called St Johns Passage. Much of the trackbed of the Bedford to Northampton Line remains intact, and there have been proposals to reopen the line.
