= Olney railway station (England) =

Former railway station in England

Coordinates: 52.159441°N 0.697719°W

Olney
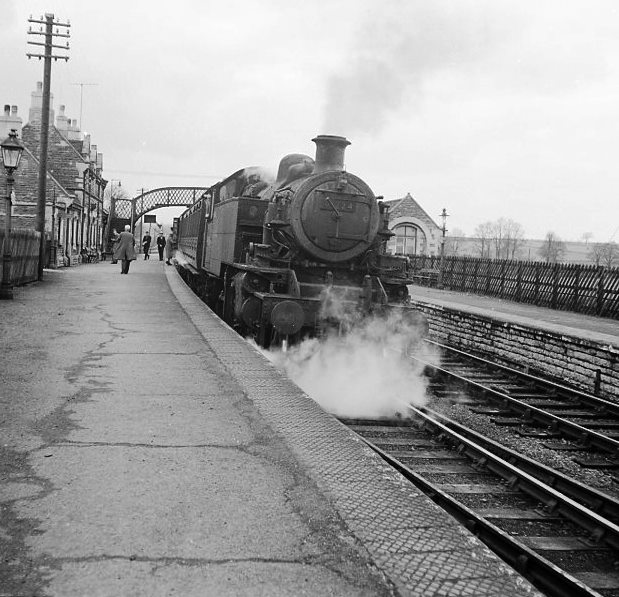
- The station in 1962

General information
- Location: Olney, City of Milton Keynes; England
- Grid reference: SP891520
- Platforms: 2

Other information
- Status: Disused

History
- Original company: Bedford & Northampton Railway
- Pre-grouping: Midland Railway
- Post-grouping: London Midland and Scottish Railway; London Midland Region of British Railways

Key dates
- 10 June 1872: Opened
- 5 March 1962: Closed to passengers
- 6 January 1964: Goods facilities withdrawn
Location

Olney was a railway station on the former Bedford to Northampton Line and Stratford-upon-Avon and Midland Junction Railway which served the town of Olney in Buckinghamshire, England. It was situated on a busy section of line between Towcester and Ravenstone Wood junction which saw heavy use by freight services running between Wales and north-east England. The station closed for passengers in 1962 and completely in 1964, the various connecting routes to the line having closed one by one from the 1950s onwards.

== History ==
=== Early years ===
Opened by the Bedford and Northampton Railway on 10 June 1872 as part of its line from Bedford to Northampton, the station came under the control of the Midland Railway on 16 July 1885. It was situated at the beginning of a 3-mile (4.8 km) climb, averaging 1 in 80, towards the line's summit near Ravenstone Wood Junction. The station was conveniently located near the centre of Olney. An attractive two-storey stone station building was provided on the Down platform where a footbridge provided access to the Up platform and its stone waiting shelter. A 9,000-imperial-gallon (41,000 L; 11,000 US gal) water tank erected in the early 1890s behind the Up platform was supplied with water from the nearby River Great Ouse. An extensive goods shed, goods office and weighbridge were also provided.

On 2 June 1865, powers were obtained for a 5.5-mile (8.9 km) extension of the Wolverton to Newport Pagnell Line to Olney. Construction began and a bridge over the Newport to Wolverton road was built. Works were however suspended in June 1866 amid difficulties which the independent Newport Pagnell Railway Company was having with the London and North Western Railway and connection with its main line at Wolverton. Although terms were eventually agreed by September 1867, there continued to be serious arguments about rental costs for the use of Wolverton and hostility by the London and North Western spread to the question of the Olney extension. Matters came to a head in July 1873 when financial difficulties forced the Newport Pagnell Company to offer to sell their railway to the London and North Western. This was completed on 29 June 1875 following a special meeting of the Newport Pagnell Company where it was agreed to abandon the Olney extension. The bridge over the Newport to Wolverton road was demolished in c. 1879.

=== Stratford & Midland Junction Railway ===
On 18 April 1889, the Midland concluded an agreement with the Stratford-upon-Avon, Towcester and Midland Junction Railway (ST&MJR) for running powers over the 3 miles 35 chains (5.5 km) section between Ravenstone Wood Junction and Olney, including the right to use Olney station and its facilities. Incorporated in 1882, the ST&MJR was run together with the East and West Junction Railway (E&WJR) under a joint committee which began functioning with the opening of the Olney line to goods on 13 April 1891 and to passengers on 1 December 1892. Together with the Evesham, Redditch and Stratford-upon-Avon Junction Railway (ER&SJR), which had been worked by the E&WJR from its opening on 2 June 1879, the joint committee presided over a combined route of 55.5-mile (89.3 km) from Olney to Broom Junction. The line provided the Midland with a useful cross-country link between its main line from St Pancras to its system in the west. The ST&MJR merged with the ER&SJR and the E&WJR to form the Stratford-upon-Avon and Midland Junction Railway with effect from 1 January 1909.

Exchange sidings were laid at Olney to handle the traffic and a small engine shed opened in the early 1890s to house the Midland locomotive which worked the short-lived passenger service to Towcester. Near the shed was a 50-foot (15 m) diameter turntable where the S&MJR's locomotives had to be turned as the running powers did not extend beyond Olney. The shed officially closed in 1928 but engines continued to be serviced here until the mid-1950s.

The first joint service, a goods train, ran on 13 April 1891. Services were worked by the Midland with its own engines but they proved too heavy for the track and so East and West Junction Railway locomotives were used between Olney and Broom after 8 December 1891. Olney became important as the terminus of SMJR freight operations from Broom and the west; the goods service consisted of through goods trains from Olney to Broom Junction and local trains. Between Olney and Towcester, the line was only open at night, with three services departing Olney between 00.00 and 03.30 on Tuesdays to Saturdays; the first two went as far as Broom and the last terminated at Woodford West Junction. Three services terminated at Olney at around 03.00 on Tuesday and Saturday mornings and just before midnight on the other days; the first came from Towcester, and the other two from Broom. On Sundays there was an early goods train to Broom.

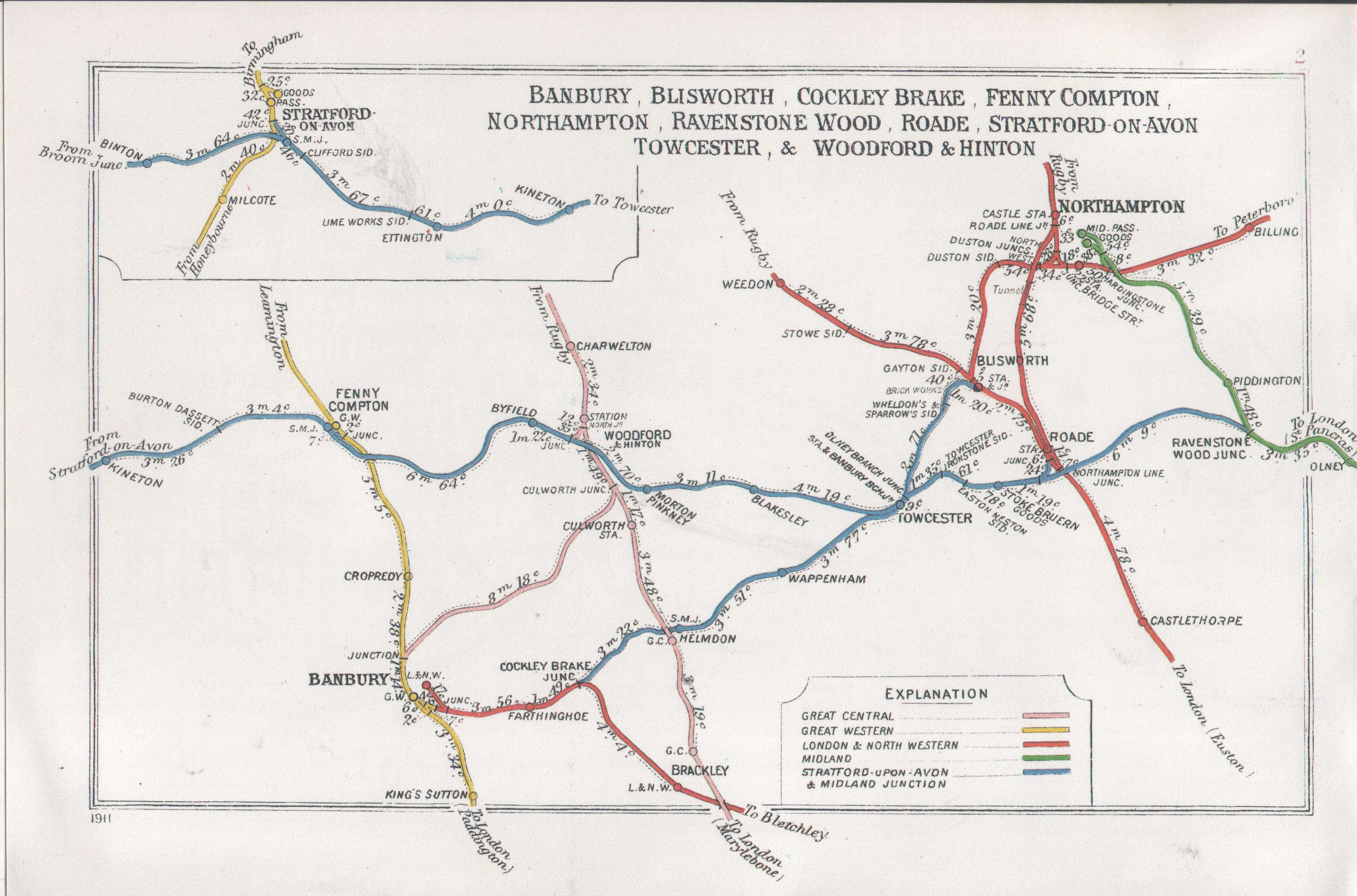
A 1911 Railway Clearing House map of railways in the vicinity of Olney (far right, in green)

Four daily passenger services were operated between Olney and Towcester from 1 December 1892 to 31 March 1893 calling at Stoke Bruern and Salcey Forest and worked by Midland tank locomotives and rolling stock. Services ran from a bay platform at Olney and connected with Stratford and Blisworth trains at Towcester. The service was however withdrawn due to low patronage; some trains were running empty and the S&MJR was unable to meet the Midland's charges for working the line.

=== Decline and closure ===
Following the grouping of 1923, the S&MJR became part of the London, Midland and Scottish Railway (LMS) which, in 1927, reintroduced passenger services between Olney and Towcester in the form of excursion trains on Towcester race days. Although it used the line to provide a shorter route from the west to London than that offered by the Great Western Railway, the LMS did not increase the traffic carried on the S&MJR; in the 1930s, the through goods services consisted of two booked down services and five up services of which three only ran when required. The fastest services over the S&MJR were banana specials bound for St Pancras (Somers Town) from Avonmouth Docks.

Following nationalisation, an increased range of through goods traffic was pathed through Olney, including steel trains from South Wales using the south curve at Broom which were destined for Scunthorpe via Woodford West Junction. However, the fall in traffic carried led, by 1952, to only the Up line to Turvey remaining in use whilst the Down line was used for stabling wagons and coaches. In 1956, the section through Olney, which was now open all day, saw five South Wales to Woodford workings, services from Stratford to Bedford, to Olney and to Turvey, one Clifford Sidings to Olney, plus return workings to Stratford and an additional as required service to Towcester. The line between Towcester and Ravenstone Wood Junction was still heavily used by freight services between Wales and the north-east when it closed on 8 June 1958, a consequence of the construction of the M1 motorway; during the weekend of official closure on 30 June 1958, the embankment at Quinton Green to the east of Roade was breached by the roadbuilders, leaving the rest of the line as two long sidings.

Olney lasted six further years, passenger services on the Bedford to Northampton line being withdrawn on 5 March 1962 followed by the withdrawal of goods facilities two years later on 6 January 1964. In its final years, the station was very quiet except for the morning and evening peaks with commuters travelling to and from work in Bedford.

Preceding station	Disused railways	Following station
Salcey Forest; Line and station closed	Stratford-upon-Avon and Midland Junction Railway; Stratford-upon-Avon, Towcester and Midland Junction Railway	Terminus
Piddington; Line and station closed	Midland Railway; Bedford to Northampton Line	Turvey; Line and station closed

== Present day ==
Nothing remains today of Olney station, the trackbed through the site having been obliterated by residential development and a new road named "Midland Road".
