= Turvey, Bedfordshire =

Village in Bedfordshire, England

Coordinates: 52.1621°N 0.6255°W

Turvey
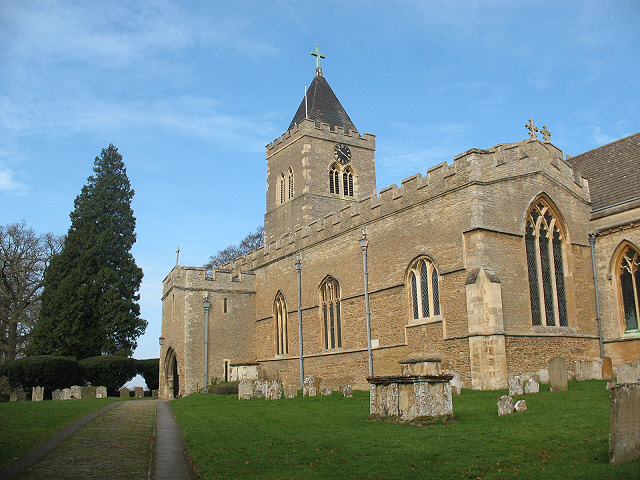
- All Saints' parish church

- Location within Bedfordshire
- Interactive map of Turvey
- Population: 1,225 2011 Census
- OS grid reference: SP943525
- Unitary authority: Bedford
- Ceremonial county: Bedfordshire
- Region: East
- Country: England
- Sovereign state: United Kingdom
- Post town: Bedford
- Postcode district: MK43
- Dialling code: 01234
- Police: Bedfordshire
- Fire: Bedfordshire
- Ambulance: East of England
- UK Parliament: North Bedfordshire
- Website: The Turvey Website

Turvey is a village and civil parish on the River Great Ouse in the Borough of Bedford, Bedfordshire, England, about 7 miles (11 km) west of Bedford town centre. The village is on the A428 road between Bedford and Northampton, close to the border with Buckinghamshire. The 2011 Census recorded the parish's population as 1,225.

== History ==
Turvey is recorded in Domesday Book of 1086 as a parish in the Hundred of Willey. There are eight separate entries for Turvey, including a total of 44 households. The Mordaunt family obtained the manor by marriage in 1197 and were ennobled as Barons of Turvey in the 16th century. The Mordaunt family house, Turvey Old Hall, was replaced by Turvey House in 1792, by which time the estate had passed to the Higgins family. It was extended in the 19th century and still stands. There is a second large house in the village called Turvey Abbey, which was historically a family house, but is now a Benedictine monastery.

The parish church of All Saints has Saxon origins but is almost certainly a post-Norman building. It is the largest church in the deanery of Sharnbrook and was in the Diocese of Lincoln until it was transferred to the Diocese of Ely in 1837. Since 1914 it has been in the Diocese of St Albans. It has a 13th-century door with its original ironwork, a Norman baptismal font, a wall painting of the crucifixion and some notable monuments, including monumental brasses. The Norman church was enlarged in the 14th and 15th centuries; sumptuous improvements were made by Sir Gilbert Scott.

Turvey has a strong history of lace-making: there is evidence of a 19th-century lace-making school.

In the 19th century the Bedford to Northampton Line of the Midland Railway was built through the parish and opened in 1872. There was a Turvey railway station in Station Road about 1 mile (1.6 km) east of the centre of the village. British Railways closed the line in 1962.

=== Public houses ===
- The Three Fyshes – built in 1487 and first sold beer in 1624.
- The Three Cranes – an historic building next to the church.
- The Laws Hotel – built 1836–40 the Laws Hotel, no longer a pub.
- The Tinker of Turvey – in the High Street, now the village stores. It was an inn until the early 19th century.
- The Kings Arms – in Jacks Lane, closed since the late 1990s, now a private house.
- The Railway Swan – at Station End, closed since the early 1990s, now a private house.

== Amenities ==
Turvey has two village stores (one with a post office), a butcher, village hall and two public houses: the Three Fyshes and The Three Cranes. There is a long-established pre-school, Turvey Pre-School Playgroup, that looks after children from 2 years old and also runs a Before and After School Club for children at the local school. Turvey Primary School is a school for children from reception (4 years old) to year six (11 years).

=== Transport ===
Stagecoach East bus route 41 bus between Bedford and Northampton serves the village.

== Population ==
The population of Turvey was 758 in 1801, rising to 1,028 in 1851 and falling to 782 by 1901. In 1951 it had dropped further to 733 but rose to 1,043 by 1991.

Turvey electoral ward includes the villages of Stagsden and Kempston Rural. Its borough councillor is Jim Weir (Conservative).

== Sources and further reading ==
- Jones, Lawrence E (1965). A Guide to Some Interesting Old English Churches. London: Historic Churches Preservation Trust. p. 9.
- Page, W.H., ed. (1912). A History of the County of Bedford. Victoria County History. Vol. 3. Westminster: Archibald Constable & Co. pp. 109–117.
- Pevsner, Nikolaus (1968). Bedfordshire and the County of Huntingdon and Peterborough. The Buildings of England. Harmondsworth: Penguin Books. pp. 158–161. ISBN 0-14-0710-34-5.
