= Stoke Bruern railway station =

Former railway station in Northamptonshire, England

Stoke Bruern
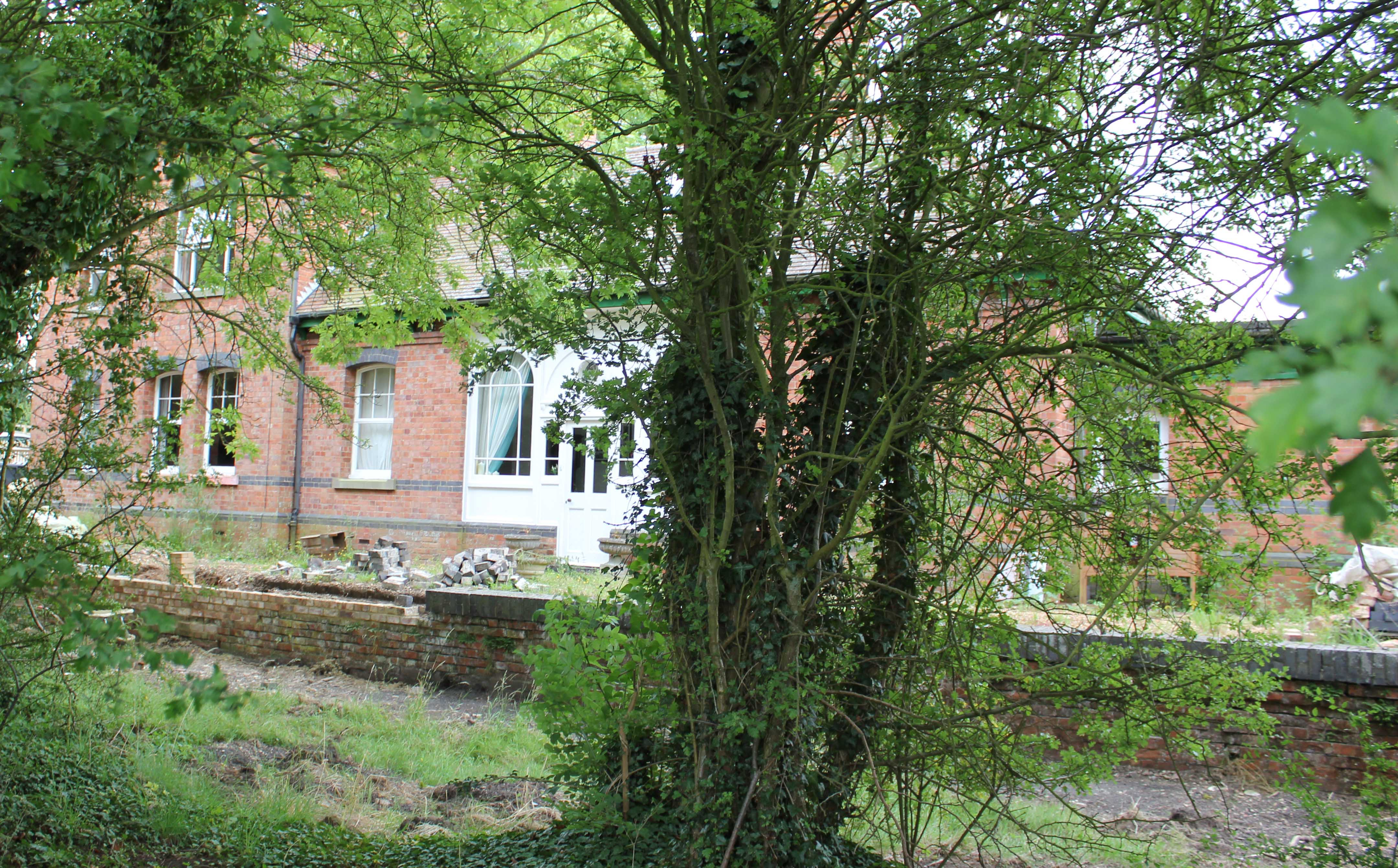
- Stoke Bruern Station remains showing platform, trackbed and booking hall (east on the left). Now a private residence

General information
- Location: Stoke Bruerne, West Northamptonshire; England
- Coordinates: 52.1479°N 0.9259°W
- Grid reference: SP735505
- Platforms: 1

Other information
- Status: Disused

History
- Original company: Stratford-upon-Avon, Towcester and Midland Junction Railway
- Pre-grouping: Stratford-upon-Avon and Midland Junction Railway
- Post-grouping: London, Midland and Scottish Railway

Key dates
- 1 December 1892: Opened
- 31 March 1893: Closed to passengers
- 2 June 1952: Goods facilities withdrawn
Location

Stoke Bruern railway station was on the Stratford-upon-Avon, Towcester and Midland Junction Railway which opened on 1 December 1892 near the Northamptonshire village of Stoke Bruerne after which it was misnamed. Passenger services were withdrawn on 31 March 1893. It is arguable that Stoke Bruern along with Salcey Forest have a claim to have had the shortest passenger service of any British railway station. On the first service, it was reported that one person alighted at Salcey Forest, but no-one joined, whilst at Stoke Bruern, seven joined and one alighted. The service attracted no more than twenty passengers a week and the SMJ incurred a loss of £40. The station was situated in a sparsely populated area and only saw passenger services for four months, despite the railway company's optimism which saw substantial station facilities provided in the expectation of traffic which never came. The station remained open for goods until 1952.

== History ==
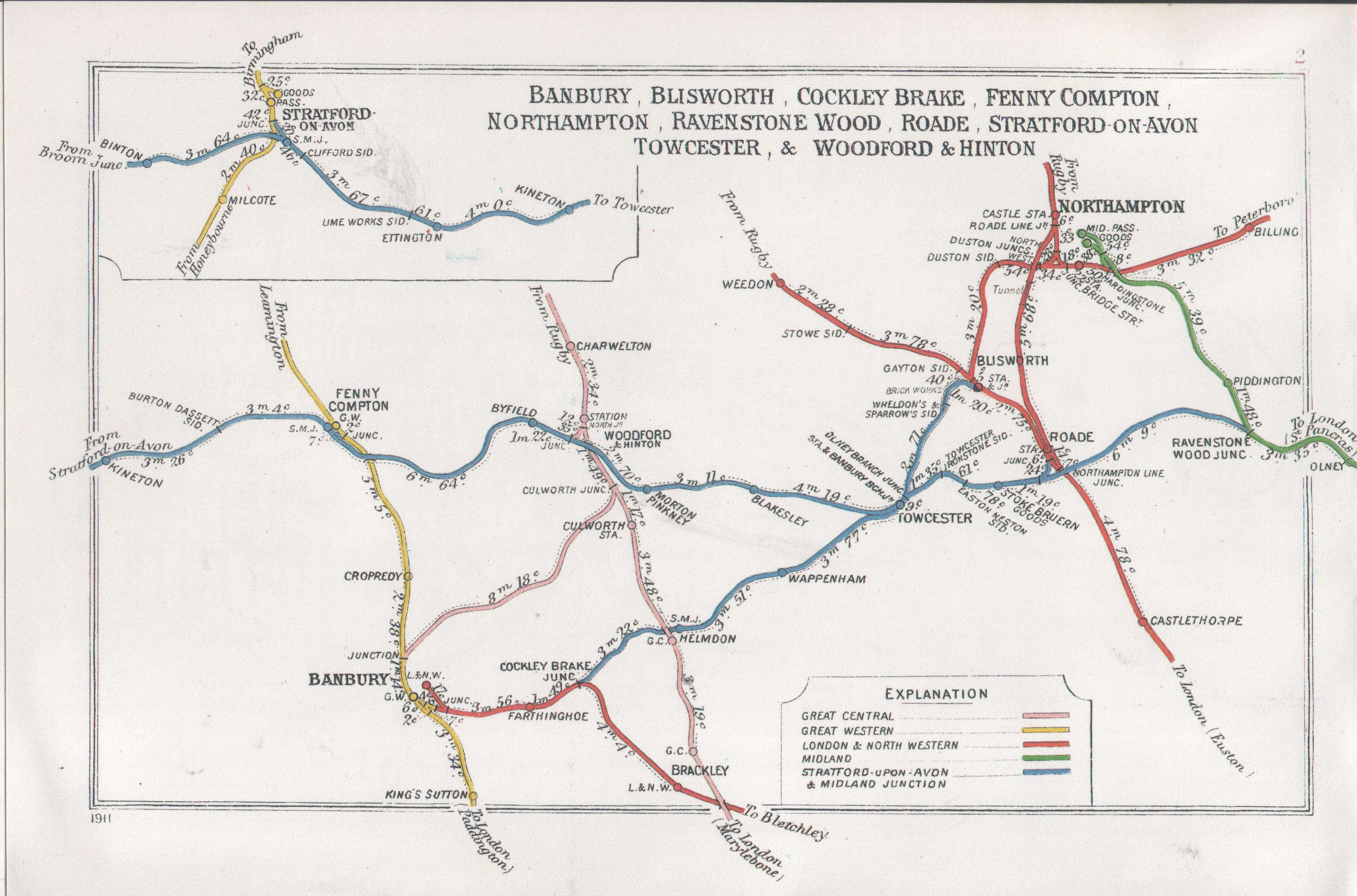
A 1911 Railway Clearing House map of railways in the vicinity of Stoke Bruern (right, in blue)

The station opened in 1892 in a thinly populated area on the western side of Stoke Road near the Northamptonshire village of Stoke Bruerne, not far from the southern portal of Blisworth Hill Tunnel on the Grand Union Canal over which ran the Stratford-upon-Avon, Towcester and Midland Junction Railway's (STMJ) east–west line from Broom to Olney. As was the case with Salcey Forest station, the railway company provided an unusually large station building which included accommodation for the stationmaster.

Passenger services began with four stopping trains a day, but traffic was so poor that this was withdrawn four months later.

The line closed "temporarily" in May 1958 to enable a bridge to be built for the M1 motorway to cross the line which never reopened to traffic (banana trains from Avonmouth Docks to Somerstown Goods) and was thereafter used to store condemned carriages until the track was eventually taken up in the late Summer of 1964. The single loop goods siding remained in use for the storage of condemned wagons until the closure of the section of the line between Woodford West junction and Blisworth in February 1964. The station building had also been used for many years by the permanent way staff. The signal box, a ground frame type box, was taken out of use in September 1912, leaving a block section 10.5 miles (16.9 km) long.

== Routes ==
Preceding station	Disused railways	Following station
Towcester; Line and station closed	Stratford-upon-Avon and Midland Junction Railway; Stratford-upon-Avon, Towcester and Midland Junction Railway	Roade; Line and station closed
Towcester; Line and station closed	Stratford-upon-Avon and Midland Junction Railway; Stratford-upon-Avon, Towcester and Midland Junction Railway	Salcey Forest; Line and station closed

== Present day ==
The station building remains as a private residence and the platform is still intact.
