= West Northamptonshire Development Corporation =

English urban development corporation

- Formation: 15 December 2004
- Dissolved: 31 March 2014
- Headquarters: Northampton
- Location: Northamptonshire
- Chair: John Markham OBE
- Chief executive: Peter Mawson
- Website: Official website

The West Northamptonshire Development Corporation (WNDC) was an urban Development Corporation to secure the regeneration of the urban development areas of Daventry, Towcester and Northampton in Northamptonshire, England.

== History ==
The corporation was established under the provisions of the Local Government, Planning and Land Act 1980 in December 2004. It was given additional functions as the planning authority for the area in 2006.

The corporation's flagship projects included the redevelopment of Northampton railway station, a new marina in Becket's Park as part of wider waterside development and the iCon building in Daventry. Around 21,500,000 square feet (2,000,000 m^{2}) of commercial development was approved by the corporation.

The Executive Team in July 2010 consisted of Peter Mawson (Chief Executive), Roger Mendonca (Deputy Chief Executive), Chris Garden (Director of Regeneration and Development), Adrian Arnold (Director of Planning Services), and Bill Allen (Director of Implementation and Delivery).

The corporation was dissolved on 31 March 2014.
