= Salcey Forest railway station =

Former railway station in England

Coordinates: 52.174288°N 0.811234°W

Salcey Forest
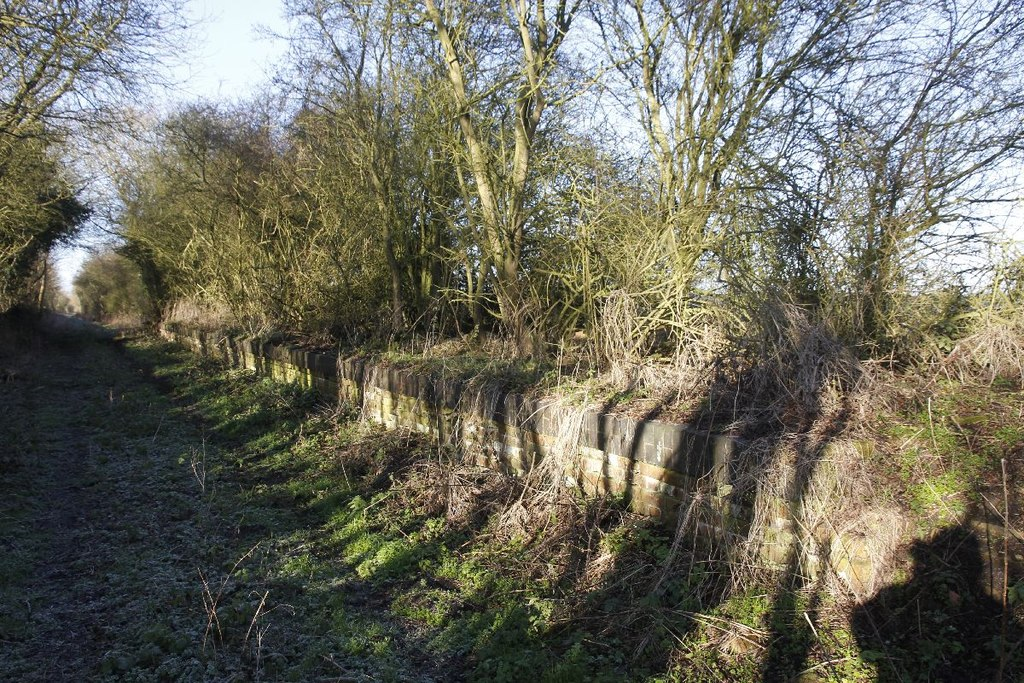
- The site of the station in 2012

General information
- Location: Salcey Forest nr Horton, West Northamptonshire; England
- Grid reference: SP813535
- Platforms: 1

Other information
- Status: Disused

History
- Original company: Stratford-upon-Avon, Towcester and Midland Junction Railway

Key dates
- 1 December 1892: Opened
- 31 March 1893: Closed to passengers
- 1 July 1908: Goods facilities withdrawn
Location

Salcey Forest railway station was a short-lived railway station in England, on the Stratford-upon-Avon, Towcester and Midland Junction Railway which opened on 1 December 1892 near the Northamptonshire forest of the same name. The station was not situated near any settlement and only saw passenger services for four months. It is most likely an error of judgement by the railway company which had provided substantial station facilities in expectation of traffic which never came. Salcey Forest station eventually closed on 31 March 1893 and has an arguable claim, along with Stoke Bruern, of having had the shortest passenger service ever provided at any British railway station. Goods facilities were withdrawn in 1952.

== History ==
The station opened in 1892 in an isolated spot of open country to the north of Salcey Forest in Northamptonshire. It formed part of the Stratford-upon-Avon, Towcester and Midland Junction Railway's (SMJ) east–west line from Broom to Olney. The reason for the station's construction is not entirely clear as it was half a mile to a mile by bridleway across the fields from Piddington and a similar distance by road and bridleway from Horton. Horton was also served by Piddington Station on the Northampton to Bedford line a similar distance away from the village. One theory is that it was provided on the request of the Duke of Grafton whose lived at nearby Salcey Lawn. As with Stoke Bruerne station, an imposing brick station building was provided which became the home to employees of the railway until the line's closure. The short approach road to the station ran to what is no more than a simple bridle path from what is now the B526 from Northampton to Newport Pagnell. The station never justified a more significant means of access as it never saw much traffic, and its provision seems to have been an error of judgement by the STMJ. The station was to the south east of Piddington and south west of Horton.

Passenger services began on 1 December 1892 with four stopping trains a day, but traffic was so poor that this was withdrawn four months later. On the first service, it was reported that one person alighted at Salcey Forest, but no-one joined, whilst at Stoke Bruerne, seven joined and one alighted. The service, which ran from Olney to Towcester, stopping also at Stoke Bruerne, attracted no more than twenty passengers a week and the SMJ incurred a loss of £40.

Salcey Forest station eventually closed on 31 March 1893 and has an arguable claim, along with Stoke Bruerne, of having had the shortest passenger service ever provided at any British railway station. The station finally closed to goods in 1908; the single loop goods siding was lifted by 1915, whilst the signal box was removed in September 1912. The line was "temporarily" closed in May 1958 for through traffic (banana trains from Avonmouth Docks to Somerstown Goods) to enable a bridge to be constructed over the line to carry the new M1 motorway. The line never reopened for traffic though it was used for the storage of old condemned coaches awaiting cutting up; the track was eventually taken up from Towcester to Ravenstone Wood Junction in the late summer of 1964. The station had a short approach road from the original (pre-turnpike) road that ran direct from the Northampton to Newport Pagnell road through the village of Piddington there known as the Old London Road. When the new turnpike road was built taking in Horton and Hackleton, by the Northampton Highways Act 1709 (8 Ann. c. 9), the original (Old London) road became reduced to its present status, that of a bridleway. The B526 bridge over the trackbed is still in use.

Preceding station	Disused railways	Following station
Stoke Bruern; Line and station closed	Stratford-upon-Avon and Midland Junction Railway; Stratford-upon-Avon, Towcester and Midland Junction Railway	Olney; Line and station closed

== Present day ==
The only traces of the station are the remains of the platform, which can be seen in the undergrowth largely intact. The buildings having been cleared away in the 1950s. The trackbed is now a mud track running between fields which forms part of the Midshires Way long-distance footpath.
