= Turvey Abbey =

Abbey in Turvey, Bedfordshire, England

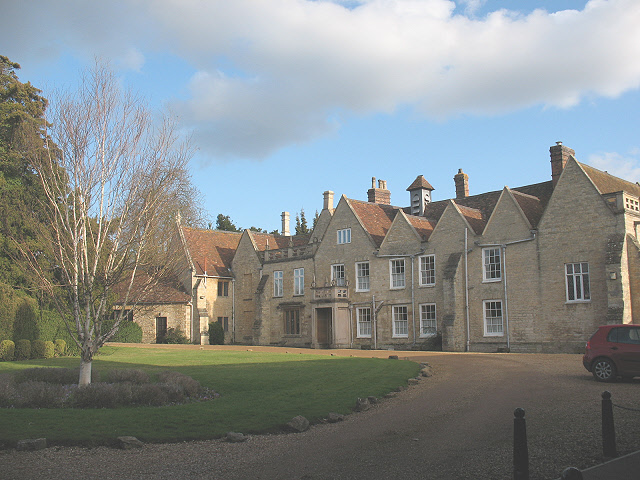
- Interactive map of Turvey Abbey

Monastery information
- Full name: Priory of Our Lady of Peace
- Order: Benedictine
- Established: 1980

Site
- Location: Turvey, Bedfordshire, England
- Coordinates: 52.16163°N 0.6182°W

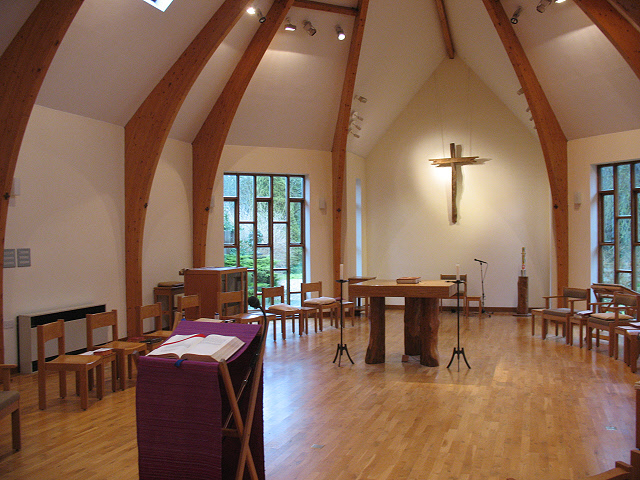
Turvey Abbey interior

Turvey Abbey is located in the village of Turvey in the English county of Bedfordshire. It is dated 1605 on the north facade and 1608 on the south facade. The building is stone, with a tile roof. A dovecote, which no longer belongs to the Abbey, is a Grade II listed building.

== Current usage ==
It now belongs to the "Priory of Our Lady of Peace", a Benedictine order of nuns. It is a Roman Catholic community living according to the Rule of Saint Benedict and affiliated to the Olivetan family of Benedictines. The Abbey is not open to the public, but the community welcomes guests.

The "Monastery of Christ our Saviour", while adjacent, is not part of Turvey Abbey.

== History ==
The original part of Turvey Abbey was built in 1603. According to the English Heritage Register it may incorporate a building even earlier than this.

The tenants who lived in the house for the longest period during this time were the Brands. Thomas Brand (died 1694) and his wife Margaret (died 1718) moved to the house in about 1670. They were Catholic recusants and are mentioned in numerous records.

William Laurence and Sarah Steward were married in 1750 in Bedford. They had six children one of whom (Thomas Laurence) was a churchwarden. William died in 1766 when all of his children were very young. In his will he made provision for his family.

In 1786 the Mordant family sold their land in Turvey. In the advertisement Sarah Laurence is mentioned as the tenant for the farm with "The Abbey". It was bought by Charles Higgins, a very wealthy merchant from London. He used it as his country house and allowed Sarah to continue living in it by dividing the building and the garden into two parts. He also made some major repairs to the property at this time. When he died in 1792 the house was inherited.

John Higgins (1768–1846) had a strong passion for "The Abbey". Even before he inherited it he made visits to Turvey to see it. He describes these in his memoirs. He said:

"In the 1781 Turvey Abbey was first seen by the writer of this memoir on his way to Bedford. The place caught his attention and exited considerable interest but he got no further account of it than that it was a farm and was called the Abbey.

About three years afterwards he was invited with some friends by the steward (employed by the Mordaunts) to a days fishing. Whilst they were taking refreshing draughts of punch in the garden of the Fishes Public House (now the Three Fyshes) he ran up the street to take a view of the old house and examined as much as he thought he might be permitted to do of the outside of the building."

He made a sketch of the front and back of the house at this time which he included in his memoirs.

In about 1801 John made some additions to the house. He built a new coach house with a clock (now called Brand House) and added balustrading and two mullioned windows brought from Easton Maudit. Later he built a walled garden and a Gothic summer house.

== See also ==
- List of monastic houses in Bedfordshire
