= South East Midlands Local Enterprise Partnership =

Agency overview
- Formed: 2011
- Dissolved: 5 March 2024
- Jurisdiction: South East Midlands

The South East Midlands Local Enterprise Partnership (SEMLEP) was a local enterprise partnership set up by the UK Government to drive economic development in the South East Midlands. Formed in 2011, the SEMLEP geographical region included 36 enterprise and innovation centres, and five universities. Its board was made up of representatives from the public and private sectors, in addition to skills providers. SEMLEP was dissolved on 5 March 2024.

== History ==
In March 2012, the UK Prime Minister David Cameron asked former Deputy Prime Minister, Michael Heseltine, to report to the Chancellor of the Exchequer George Osborne and the Secretary of State for Business Vince Cable as to how wealth might be more effectively created in the UK. The Chancellor announced the terms of the review on 21 March 2012. The result was 'No Stone Unturned', which was largely accepted by government, and included 89 recommendations to help industry. One of its key aims was to move £49bn from central government to the English regions to help local leaders and businesses, according to a BBC report which added the aim was to "devolve power from Whitehall and re-invigorate the big cities that had fuelled the growth and wealth that the country had enjoyed in past decades". The report led to the coalition government establishing Local Enterprise Partnerships, replacing the Regional Development Agencies.

On 15 August 2016 the government approved a merger between SEMLEP and Northamptonshire LEP.

The South East Midlands Local Enterprise Partnership was disbanded in March 2024 following withdrawal of funding by the Rishi Sunak Conservative government. Its functions were transferred to the individual unitary authorities who collectively formed the South Midlands Growth Hub.

== Geography and economic data ==
SEMLEP comprised the six unitary authorities of the Borough of Bedford, Central Bedfordshire, Luton Borough Council, Borough of Milton Keynes, North Northamptonshire and West Northamptonshire.

In total the LEP area had a £39 billion economy, 67,000 businesses and 1.8 million population.

The area has an established regional infrastructure, which includes access to major road networks, dedicated terminals for air freight (Luton), and rail freight located at Daventry International Rail Freight Terminal (DIRFT) and the Eurohub in Corby. The LEP has sought extra funds to invest in transport infrastructure. SEMLEP has "prioritised more than 20 transport and infrastructure projects, including the bypass and a dual carriageway for the section of the A421 linking Milton Keynes with Junction 13 of the M1", according to a report in Bedford Today. "The Strategic Economic Plan details how SEMLEP will by 2020 grow the economy by £10.2billion, create an additional 94,700 jobs and build an extra 70,600 homes across its patch in Bedfordshire, Northamptonshire, Milton Keynes, Cherwell District and Aylesbury Vale District," reports MK Web and Bedford Today.

== SEMLEP Enterprise Zone ==
In August 2011 the Government announced that the SEMLEP Waterside Enterprise Zone had been selected as one of 21 new Enterprise Zones across the country.

Northampton's Waterside will become a national centre for excellence for advanced technologies, precision engineering, low carbon technology, sustainable construction and high performance engineering. Cosworth,the world-renowned UK performance engineering and manufacturing group, has begun construction on its new £12 million Advanced Manufacturing Centre at its Northampton site, according to one report from freshbusinessthinking.com. The facility, the first of its kind in the UK, will manufacture components and assemble some of the world's most advanced engines to global automotive manufacturers, the report said.

In June 2014, the University of Northampton announced it would relocate its campuses to the Zone's eastern section. In a BBC online report it said: "The university is planning to relocate from its current sites in St George's Avenue and Boughton Green Road, to a 55-acre site at Nunn Mills Road in the town's new Waterside Enterprise Zone." Vice-chancellor Prof Nick Petford was reported by the BBC as saying "the development would 'secure the future' of the university". In the BBC report Councillor David Mackintosh, leader of Northampton Borough Council, said the plans were "tremendous news" for the development of Northampton as a university town. He added: "Bringing the university into the Waterside area is a key part of the Northampton Alive regeneration programme and would be a massive boost to the local economy, as well as creating vital links with business in the Waterside Enterprise Zone.
