= Rail transport in Northamptonshire =

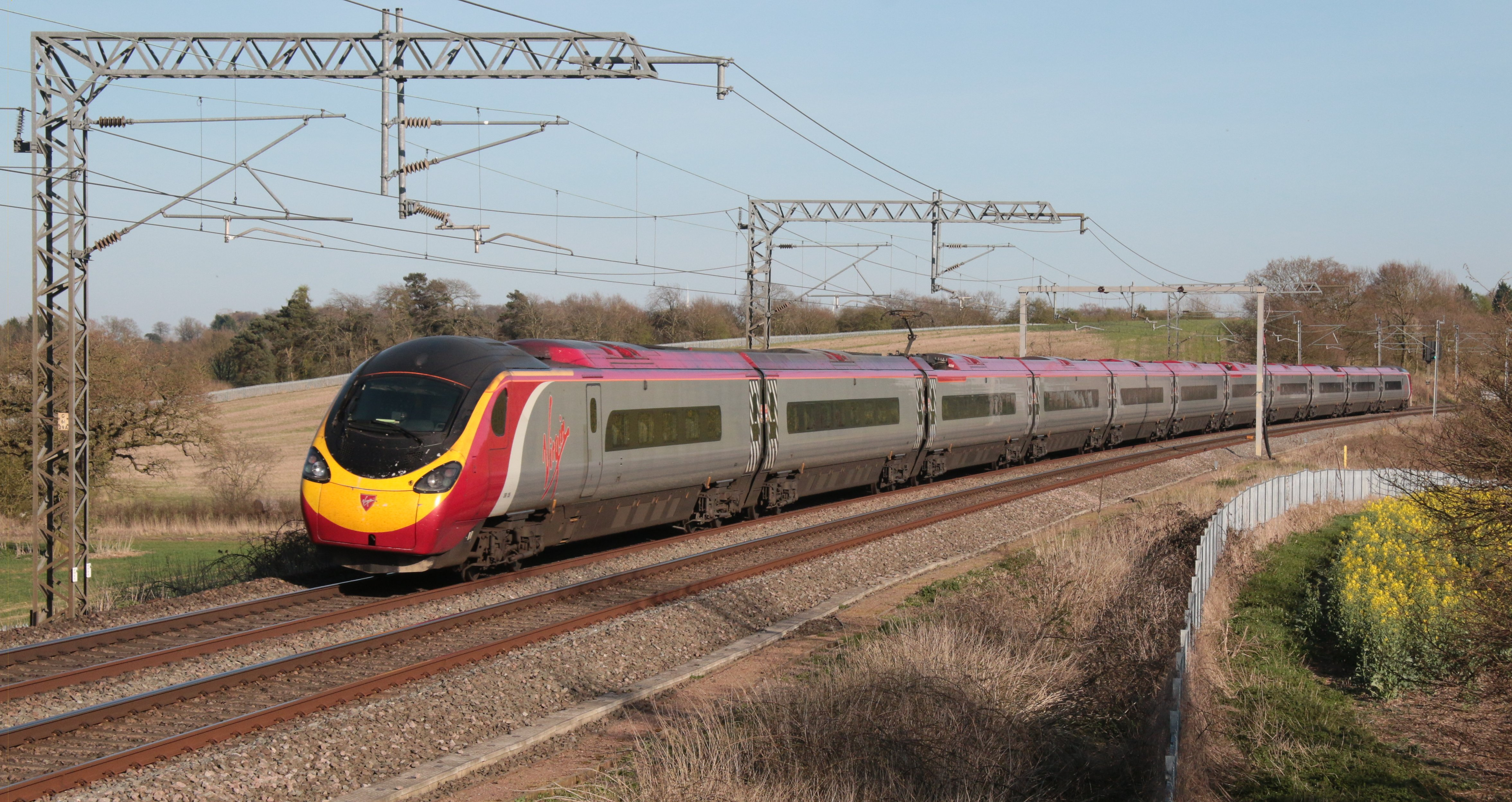
- Trackside view of southbound British Rail Class 390 from the public footpath at Roade, Northamptonshire

Operation
- Infrastructure company: National Rail
- Major operators: East Midlands Railway London Northwestern Railway

Statistics
- Ridership: 4.86 million (2023)

Track gauge
- Main: 1,435 mm (4 ft 8 1/2 in)

Features
- No. of stations: 6
Map
- Map of National Rail lines within Northamptonshire

Rail transport in Northamptonshire forms an essential part of Northamptonshire's transport infrastructure and contributes to the broader rail network of Great Britain. Located in the South Midlands, Northamptonshire has long served as a corridor for north–south rail travel, linking London to urban centres in the north. Despite the county's modest rail coverage today, it has a rich railway history shaped by industrial growth.

Railway development in Northamptonshire began in the 1840s with the arrival of the London and Birmingham Railway, a major component of what would become the West Coast Main Line. The county was soon crisscrossed by a number of branch lines and secondary routes built by competing railway companies, including the Midland Railway, the Great Northern Railway, and the Great Central Railway.

However, the latter half of the 20th century saw a sharp decline in local rail services. As part of the Beeching axe of the 1960s, the vast majority of Northamptonshire's stations and lines were deemed unprofitable and closed. From a historical total of 92 stations, the county today is served by just six on the national rail network. Many former lines have since been dismantled, repurposed as footpaths or cycleways, or remain disused.

Today, railway infrastructure in Northamptonshire is maintained by Network Rail, with services being operated by several Train Operating Companies. Services are concentrated along key intercity routes and commuter corridors, with main stations at Northampton, Wellingborough, and Kettering.

== History ==
Historically, rail transport in Northamptonshire has been hampered by the fact that most railway lines pass through the county, as opposed to the county being a destination itself.

Northamptonshire historically had many railways and stations, having had 92 total railway stations, most of which were closed following the Beeching cuts, leaving the county with six railway stations still open on the national rail network.

The first major passenger railway to enter Northamptonshire was the London and Birmingham Railway (L&BR) in 1838; however, it did not pass through the county town of Northampton. This is thought to be because the gradients from Blisworth, where the L&BR passed, to Northampton were larger than locomotives at the time were capable of handling.

The decision to avoid Northampton by the L&BR meant that the largest settlement in the county, Northampton, did not have direct rail links to London. A branch from the main line was built to Northampton in the early 1840s: the Northampton and Peterborough Railway, from Blisworth, which gave the town indirect rail links to London and Birmingham.

The successor to the L&BR, the London and North Western Railway (LNWR), decided to construct the Northampton loop line through Northampton in the 1870s. It was built as part of a wider scheme to double the capacity of the West Coast Main Line between Bletchley and Rugby by quadrupling the track; however, routing the additional tracks on a deviation via Northampton had the advantage of giving the town a much better rail service, including a direct service to London, and avoiding the cost of widening the Kilsby Tunnel. The LNWR obtained parliamentary approval for the line in 1875 and commenced construction in 1877.

Following the nationalisation of British railways in 1948, British Railways took over the running of all lines and stations within the country.

In an effort to remove railway lines that were seen as unprofitable or an "unnecessary duplication" of existing railways, Richard Beeching, then chair of British Railways, began a reorganisation process known as the Beeching cuts in a bid to restore profitability and increase efficiency. This resulted in the closure of most smaller passenger lines themselves, rather than the limited station closures that had preceded them. Some were spared complete closure through conversion to freight-only operation. Most of these freight-only lines were later closed fully, although some remain open.

=== Significance of stations ===
When it was decided to expand Northampton railway station, owing to the proximity of the River Nene, the only way the expansion could be facilitated was to expand onto the site of Northampton Castle. On 18 December 1876, the L&NWR purchased the site from William Walker and subsequently demolished the remains of the castle except for the postern gate, which, following a local petition, was moved to a new site in the boundary wall of the new station, where it remains to this day.

Following the Great Depression in the United Kingdom, several post-grouping railways were forced to initiate station closures. The London, Midland and Scottish Railway, successors to the Midland Railway, decided in July 1939 to close St. John's as a cost-cutting measure. Services were switched to Castle station via Hardingstone junction.

== Former railways ==
=== Great Central Railway ===
The Great Central Railway (GCR) entered Northamptonshire in the west, away from Northampton itself. The railway entered the county south of Rugby. The GCR crossed a tributary of the River Leam by the Staverton viaduct, the River Leam itself through the Catesby viaduct, and a range of hills at the end of the valley through the Catesby Tunnel. Former stations on the line (within Northamptonshire) are:

- Brackley Central railway station
- Helmdon railway station
- Culworth railway station
- Eydon Road Halt railway station
- Chalcombe Road Halt railway station
- Woodford Halse railway station
- Charwelton railway station

=== Former LNWR lines ===
==== Rugby–Peterborough line ====
The Rugby–Peterborough line passes through the north of Northamptonshire. The L&BR, prior to its merger to become the London and North Western Railway (LNWR), were interested in creating a branch line, from Rugby to Peterborough, with the intention of keeping the Midland Railway out of Northamptonshire. The branch line was a single track which opened between 1850 and 1852 in stages however only got as far as Seaton railway station, requiring the use of the Midland Railway's Syston and Peterborough Railway to get to Peterborough. The line was doubled in 1878, and the LNWR built the final section of the line from Seaton to Peterborough in 1879. Former stations within Northamptonshire include:

- Ashley and Weston railway station
- Wakerley and Barrowden railway station
- King's Cliffe railway station
- Nassington railway station
- Lilbourne railway station (village in Northamptonshire, station in Leicestershire)
- Rockingham railway station (Leicestershire) (village in Northamptonshire, station in Leicestershire)

==== Weedon–Leamington Spa ====
The LNWR (now known as the West Coast Main Line) passed through the village Weedon, which was then an important military supply depot and barracks. The LNWR created a line, originally from Weedon railway station to Daventry railway station, although in 1890 they received approval to extend the line to Leamington Spa railway station and it was opened in 1895. Former stations on the line included:

- Weedon railway station
- Daventry railway station
- Braunston London Road railway station

==== Banbury–Bletchley line ====
The LNWR also created a line from Banbury to Bletchley, passing through Northamptonshire, from Banbury (on the line now known as the Chiltern Main Line) to Bletchley. The line was in the south of the country and construction was started in 1847, and completed in 1850. Stations on the former line within Northamptonshire include:

- Farthinghoe railway station
- Brackley railway station

==== Market Harborough–Northampton line ====
The LNWR also created a line from Market Harborough to Northampton in 1859. This included within it the complete remodelling and expansion of Northampton Castle railway station, which up to that point had been a smaller station serving only the Northampton Loop section of the West Coast Main Line. The line interchanged with the Northampton Loop at Northampton Castle station, and with the line to Peterborough at Northampton Bridge Street station. The line also featured two sets of two tunnels, the Oxendon Tunnels and the Kelmarsh Tunnels.

The line was originally a single-tracked line, but due to the high demand on the line during the 1860s, it was turned into a double track. The Newark-Market Harborough line built by the Great Northern Railway (GNR) in 1879 also increased demand on the Northampton–Market Harborough line, and the LNWR was able to run trains on the Newark-Market Harborough line in exchange for the GNR being able to run trains on the Northampton–Market Harborough line. This allowed for the LNWR to run direct services between Northampton and Nottingham.

The line allowed for Northampton to access further locations in the Midlands and further north by trains changing at Market Harborough station. This allowed for a direct train from Northampton to Skegness on Saturdays during the summer.

Stations on the former line within Northamptonshire include:

- Clipston and Oxendon railway station
- Kelmarsh railway station
- Lamport railway station
- Brixworth railway station
- Spratton railway station
- Pitsford and Brampton railway station
- Northampton Castle railway station
- Northampton Bridge Street railway station

==== Northampton–Peterborough line ====
The L&BR also constructed a railway from its mainline (the WCML) to Peterborough, linking up with its line from Peterborough to Rugby at Yarwell Junction. Construction of the line began in 1844, and the railway reached from Blisworth station on the WCML to Northampton Bridge Street by 1845.

Stations on the former line within Northamptonshire include:

- Blisworth railway station
- Northampton Bridge Street railway station
- Billing railway station
- Castle Ashby & Earls Barton railway station
- Wellingborough London Road railway station
- Ditchford railway station
- Irthlingborough railway station
- Ringstead and Addington railway station
- Thrapston Bridge Street railway station
- Thorpe railway station
- Barnwell railway station
- Oundle railway station

=== Stratford-upon-Avon and Midland Junction Railway ===
The Stratford-upon-Avon and Midland Junction Railway was a railway from Stratford-upon-Avon to Olney.

Stations on the former line within Northamptonshire include:

- Aston le walls railway station
- Byfield railway station
- Morton Pinkney railway station
- Blakesley railway station
- Tiffield railway station
- Towcester railway station
- Stoke Bruern railway station
- Salcey Forest railway station
- Wappenham railway station
- Helmdon Village railway station
- Roade railway station

=== Midland Railway lines ===
==== Harringworth viaduct line ====
The Midland Railway constructed a line off their main line. This line contains within it the Welland Viaduct, formerly the longest railway viaduct in the United Kingdom from its completion in 1878 until 2024 when HS2's Colne Valley Viaduct surpassed it.

Stations on the former line within Northamptonshire include:

- Geddington railway station
- Corby railway station
- Gretton Halt railway station
- Harringworth railway station

==== Kettering, Thrapston and Huntingdon Railway ====
The Midland Railway also constructed a branch line from their mainline, from Kettering to Huntingdon, which opened in 1866.

Stations on the former line within Northamptonshire include:

- Kettering railway station
- Cranford railway station
- Twywell railway station
- Thrapston Midland Road railway station
- Raunds railway station

==== Bedford–Northampton line ====
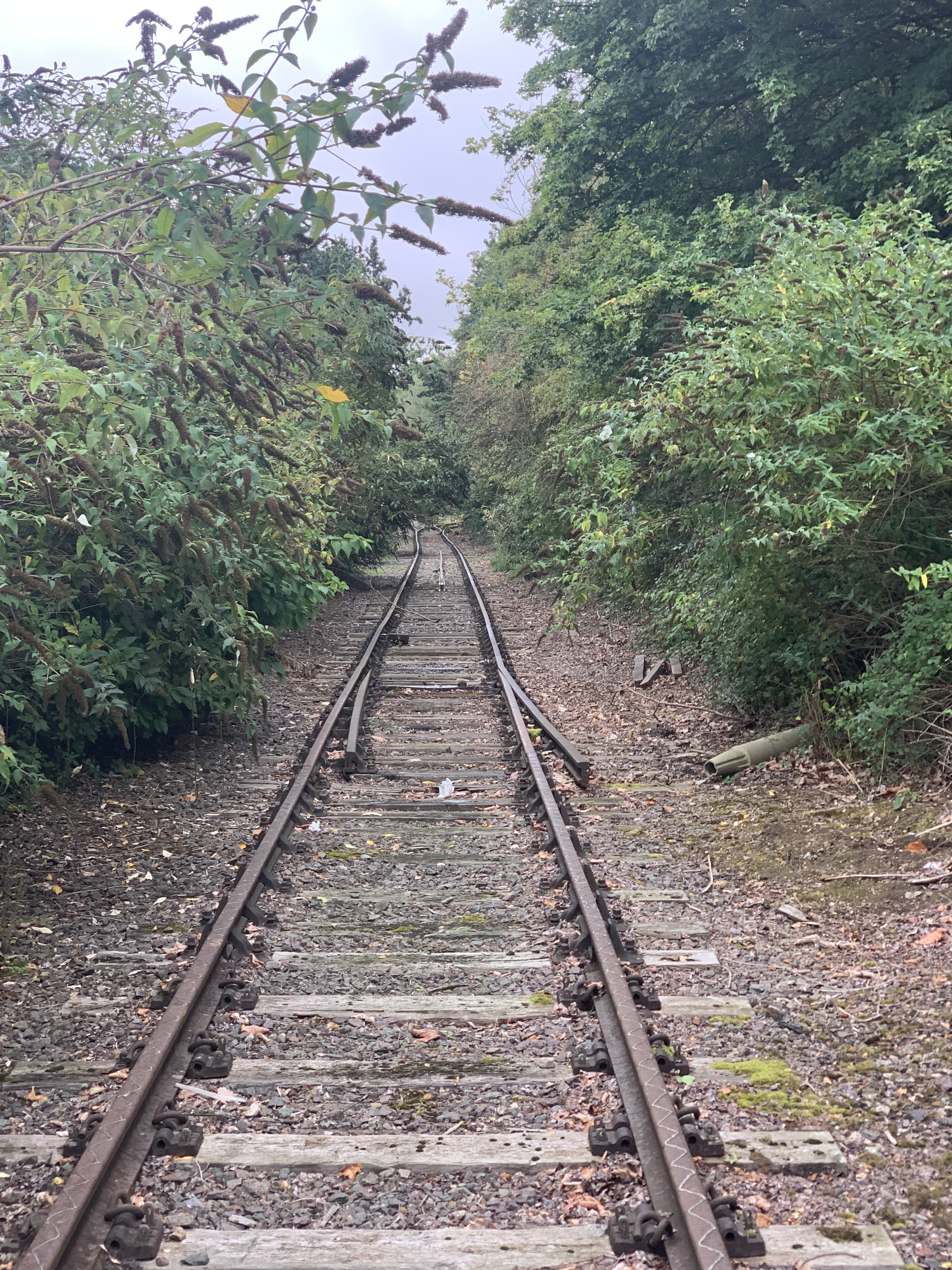
Some railway tracks on the Northampton–Bedford line remain in Brackmills, Northampton.

The Bedford–Northampton line was built by the Midland Railway and opened in 1872.

Stations on the former line within Northamptonshire include:

- Northampton St. John's Street railway station
- Piddington railway station

==== Wellingborough–Higham Ferrers line ====
The Midland Railway constructed a branch line from its Main Line to Higham Ferrers in 1892 and 1893, this was the last railway constructed in Northamptonshire. The railway was single-tracked throughout its life.

Stations on the former line within Northamptonshire include:

- Rushden railway station
- Higham Ferrers railway station

== Other rail ==
Northamptonshire also used to have within it several tram networks. Northampton Street Tramways and then Northampton Corporation Tramways operated a series of trams within Northampton from 1881 to 1934. The Finedonhill Tramway for Ironstone was also in operation in Northamptonshire between 1875 and 1926, as well as Neilson's Tramway from 1881 to 1929.

== Current operations ==
Rail lines in Northamptonshire in 1948 versus their current extent

Currently Northamptonshire is served by 3 mainlines, the Chiltern Main Line (although this is only briefly in Northamptonshire), the Midland Main Line, and the West Coast Main Line. It has six passenger stations:

- Corby
- Kettering
- Kings Sutton
- Long Buckby
- Northampton
- Wellingborough

Northamptonshire saw a ridership of about 4.86 million passengers in 2022/23.

Northamptonshire is also served in rail freight by the Daventry International Rail Freight Terminal, as well as the under-construction Northampton Gateway Rail Freight Interchange due to its location in the centre of the country, termed as the "golden logistics triangle" by the ONS, an area within a 4-hour drive of 90% of the UK population, making it an area with a very high density of logistics centres. North Northamptonshire and West Northamptonshire are, for this reason, ranked 5th and 7th nationally for percentage of business units used for transport and storage.

=== West Coast Main Line ===
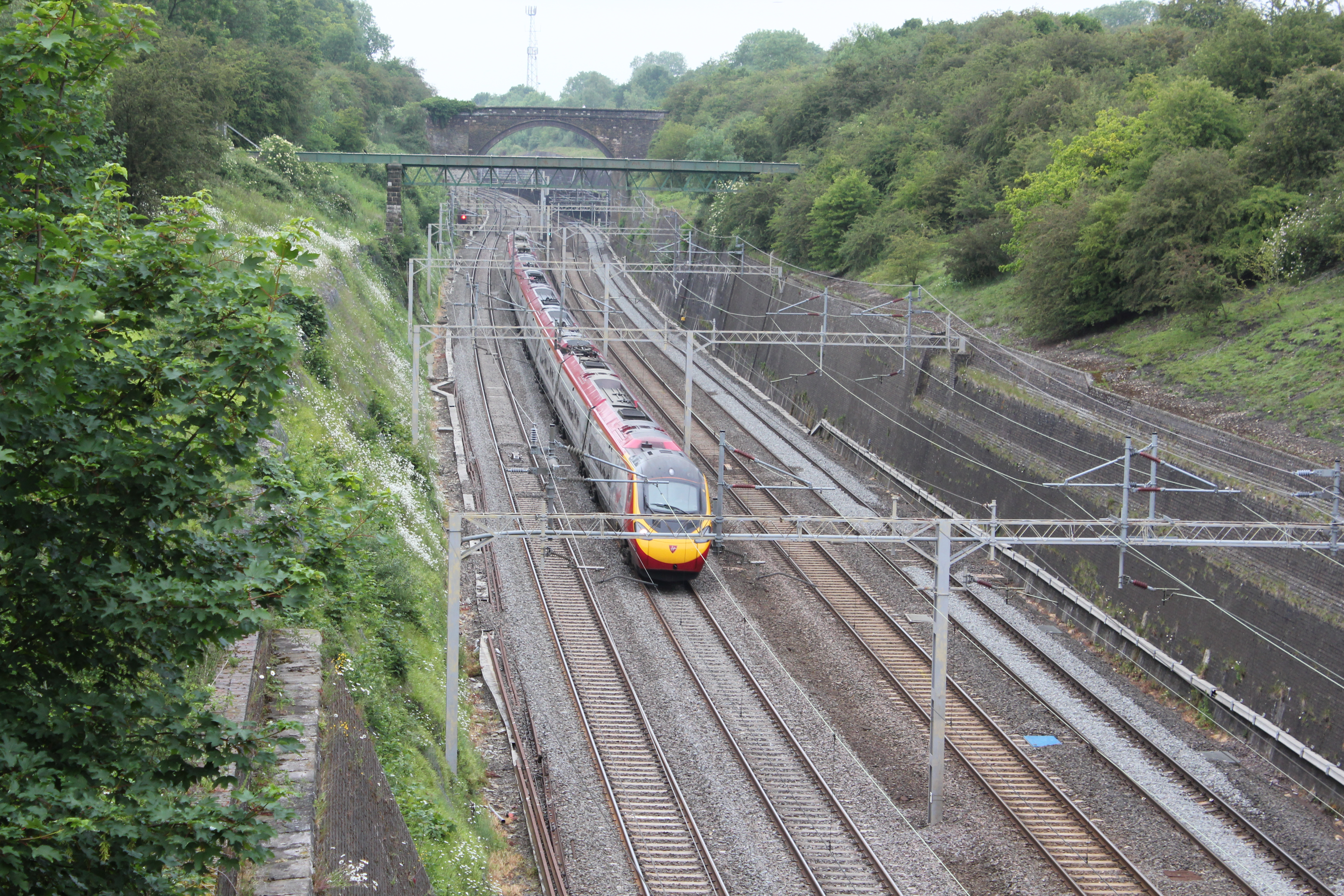
Roade Cutting on the West Coast Main Line

The West Coast Main Line (WCML) passes through Northamptonshire, however, no stations are located on the Main Line and it runs express through the county.

Closed stations on the line are Blisworth railway station, Roade railway station, Weedon railway station, and Welton railway station.

=== Northampton loop ===
The Northampton loop is a loop line that splits off from the WCML at Hanslope Junction and rejoins at Rugby. The two operational stations on the loop line are Northampton and Long Buckby.

Closed stations on the line are Kilsby and Crick railway station, Althorp Park railway station, Church Brampton railway station, and Roade railway station where the two sets of tracks diverge.

=== Midland Main Line ===
The Midland Main Line serves the stations of Wellingborough, Corby, and Kettering within Northamptonshire.

Closed stations on the line are Desborough railway station, Glendon and Rushton railway station, Isham and Burton Latimer railway station, Finedon railway station, and Irchester railway station.

=== Chiltern Main Line ===
The Chiltern Main Line is within the county boundary of Northamptonshire only very briefly, and as such only one station, Kings Sutton, is within Northamptonshire.

== Future ==
=== High Speed 2 ===
The High Speed 2 (HS2) railway project passes through Northamptonshire, although has no stations within the county. The Greatworth Green Tunnel, Edgcote Viaduct, and Chipping Warden Green Tunnel structures are located within Northamptonshire.

=== Railway campaigns ===
A campaign by the British Regional Transport Association has been ongoing to restore the Northampton–Market Harborough line to enable a direct link from Northampton to Leicester. These plans have met approval from some members of Harborough District Council.

Additionally, there has been a campaign to open a new Rushden Parkway railway station on the site of the former Irchester railway station.

== See also ==
- Rail transport in Great Britain
- Railways in Buckinghamshire
