= John Livock =

English architect

- Born: 30 July 1814; Hampstead, London, England
- Died: 15 March 1883 (aged 68); London, England
- Occupation: Architect
- Buildings: London and North Western Railway stations

John William Livock (30 July 1814 - 15 March 1883) was an architect based in England, best known for his railway stations constructed for the London and North Western Railway.

== Family ==
He was born on 30 July 1814 in Hampstead, the son of John Livock (1781-1840) a coal merchant, and Mary Millican (1792-1865). He was baptised on 25 September 1814 in St John's Church, Hampstead. He married Julia Barker (1823-1867) and they had two children

- John Edward Livock (1848-1858)
- Mary Livock (1850-1914)

He died on 15 March 1883 in London.

== Career ==
He constructed many of the stations on the Blisworth to Peterborough railway line which was built by the London and North Western Railway, and the Trent Valley Line and the southern part of the North Staffordshire Railway.

== List of works ==
- Northampton Bridge Street railway station 1845
- Billing railway station 1845
- Castle Ashby & Earls Barton railway station 1845
- Wellingborough London Road railway station 1845
- Ditchford railway station 1845
- Irthlingborough railway station 1845
- Ringstead and Addington railway station 1845
- Thrapston Bridge Street railway station 1845
- Thorpe railway station 1845
- Barnwell railway station 1845
- Oundle railway station 1845
- Elton railway station 1845
- Wansford railway station 1845
- Castor railway station 1845
- Overton (later Orton Waterville) railway station 1845
- Peterborough East railway station 1845
- Brinklow railway station 1847
- Shilton railway station 1847
- Bulkington railway station 1847
- Nuneaton railway station 1847 (replaced 1873)
- Atherstone railway station 1847
- Polesworth railway station 1847
- Tamworth railway station 1847
- Lichfield Trent Valley railway station 1847 (demolished)
- Armitage railway station 1847
- Colwich railway station 1847 (demolished)
- Crossing keeper’s cottage, Mancetter 1847
- Portals to Shugborough Tunnel 1847
- Bridge on the Shugborough estate 1847
- Milford and Brocton railway station 1847
- Bodicote school 1852
- Queen's and North Western Hotel, Birmingham 1854
- Watford Junction railway station 1858
- Benskin’s House, Station Road, Watford 1860
- Buckingham railway station 1861
- Whitwell church, Shropshire 1861 (improvements to the apse)
- Bloxham school 1863
- 24 Upper Brook Street, London. Additional storey. 1880.
- Market Harborough railway station 1884

== Gallery ==
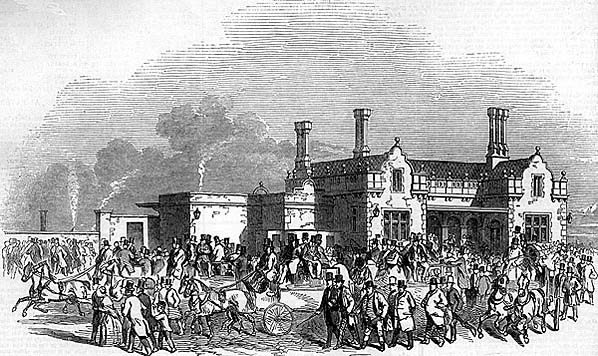
Northampton Bridge Street railway station

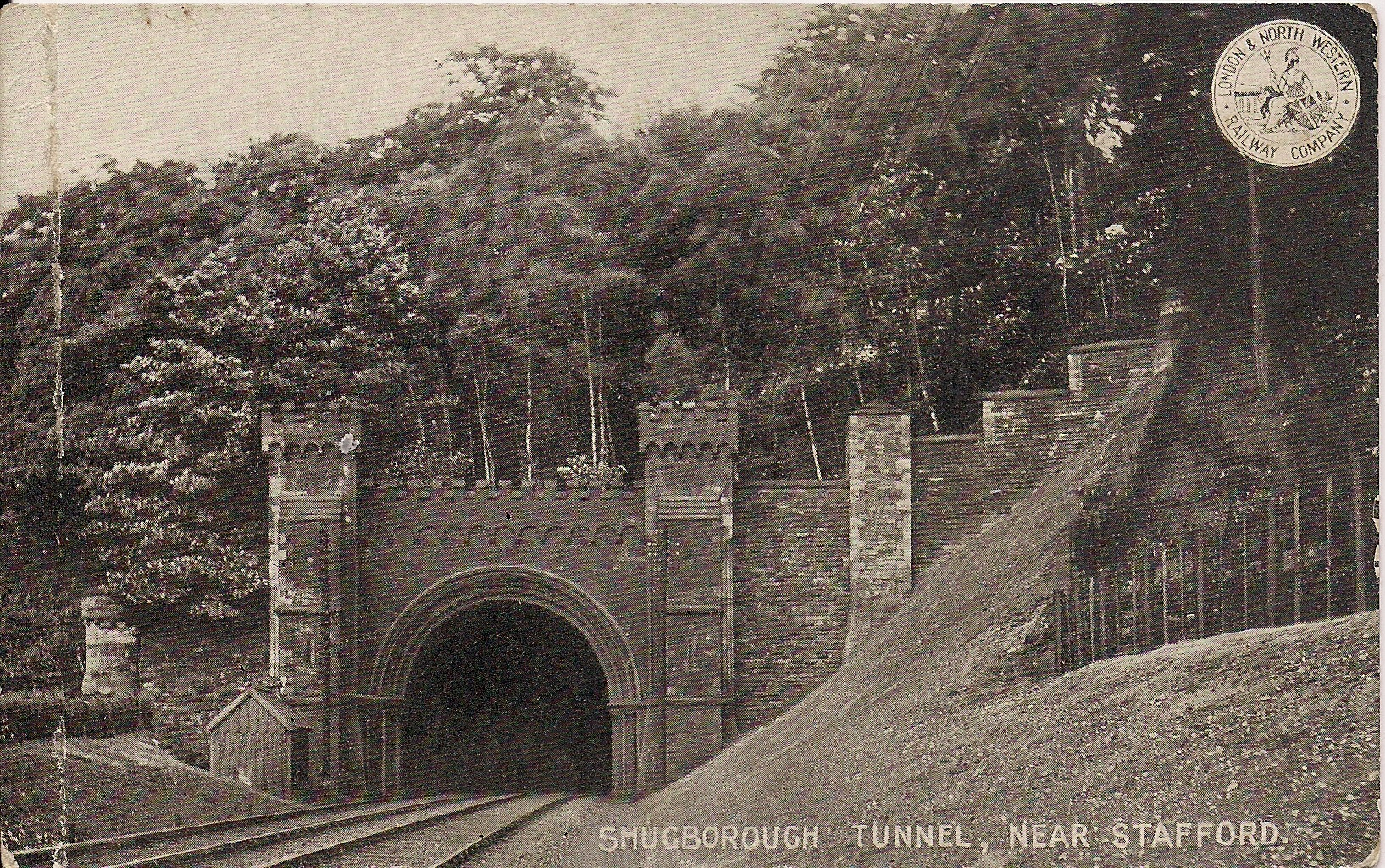
Shugborough Tunnel portal

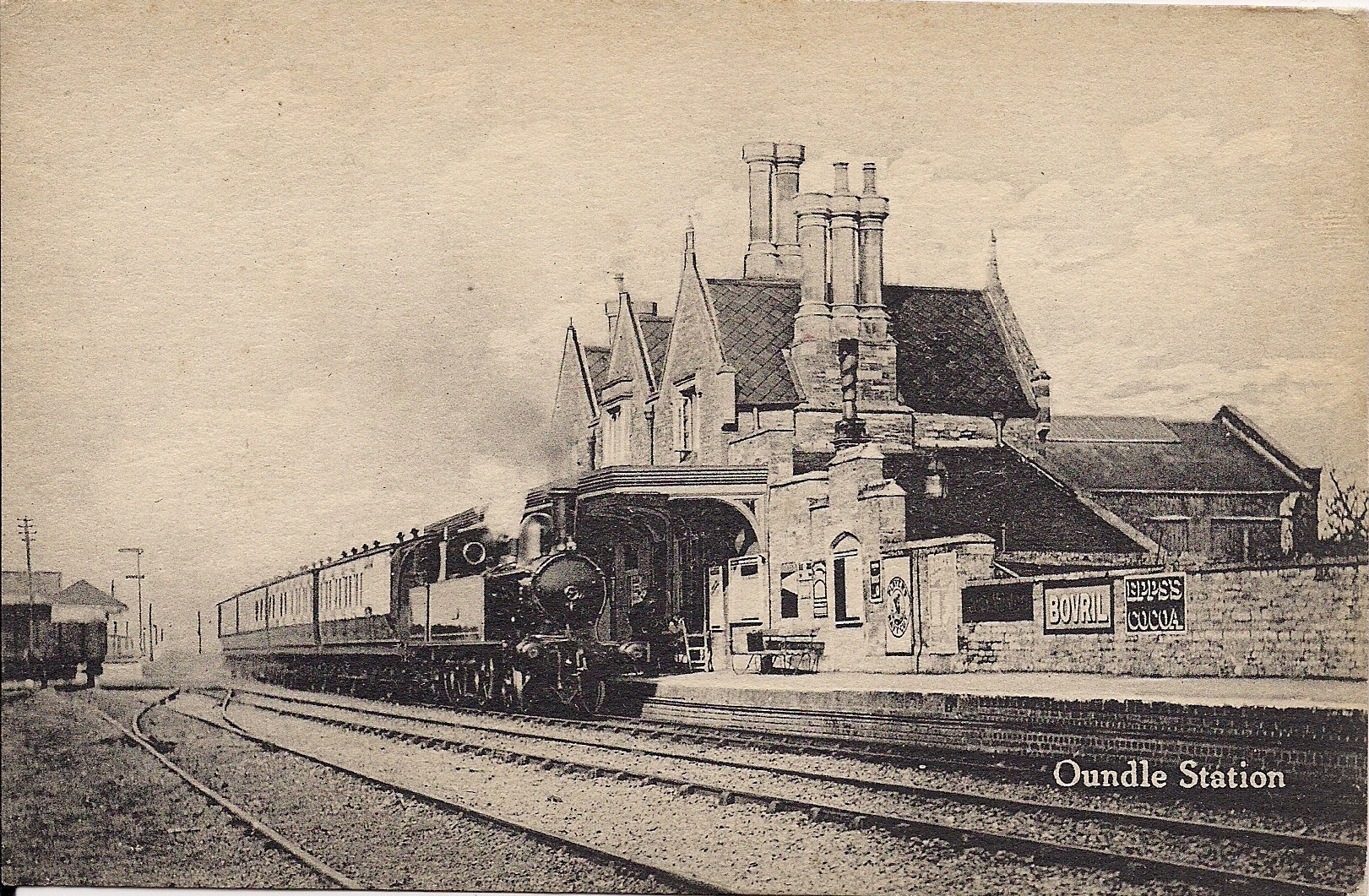
Oundle railway station

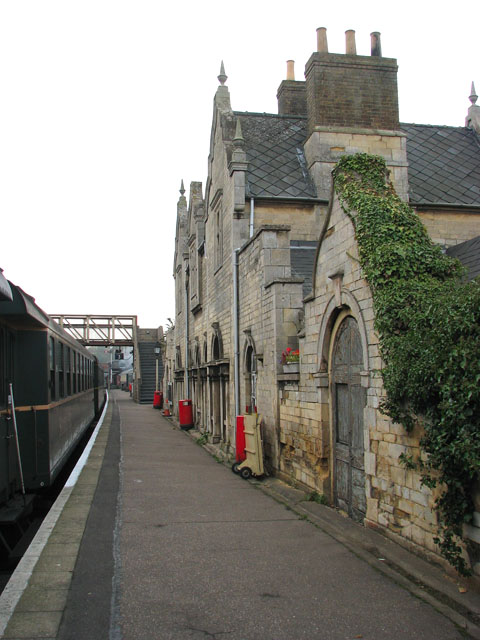
Wansford railway station

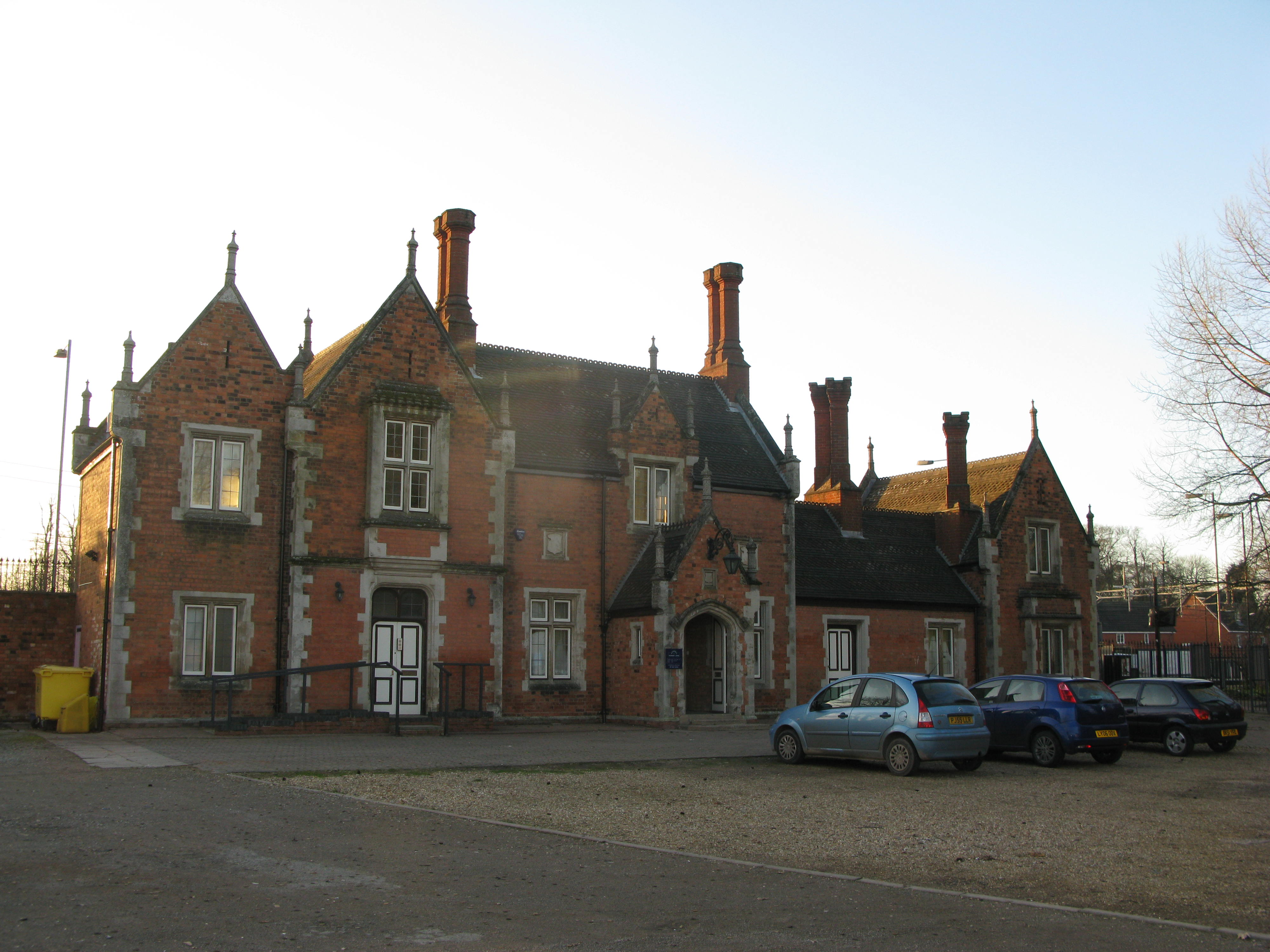
Atherstone railway station

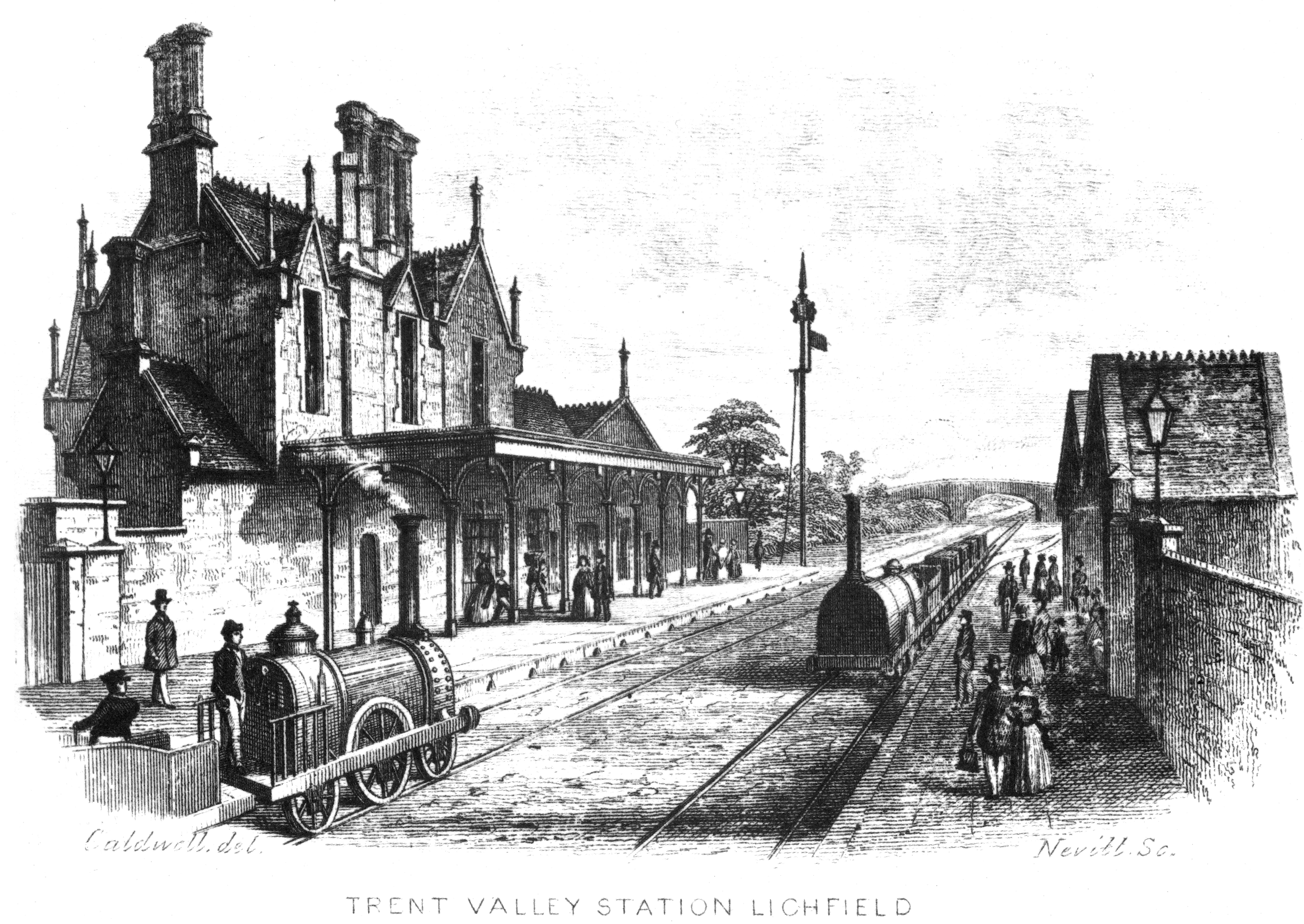
Lichfield Trent Valley station

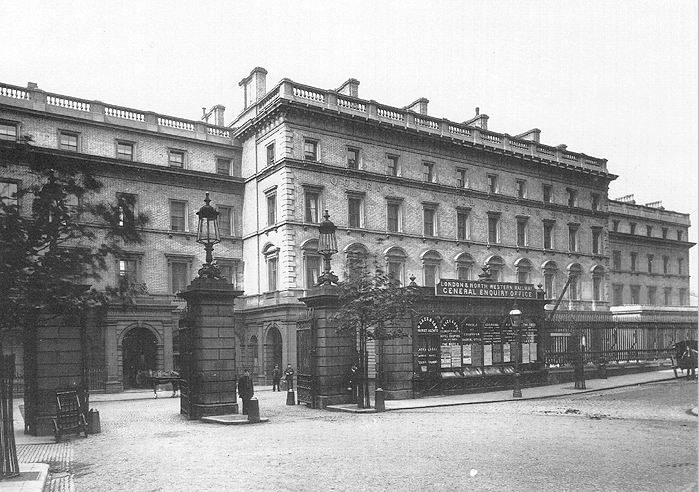
Queen's and Northwestern Hotel, Birmingham

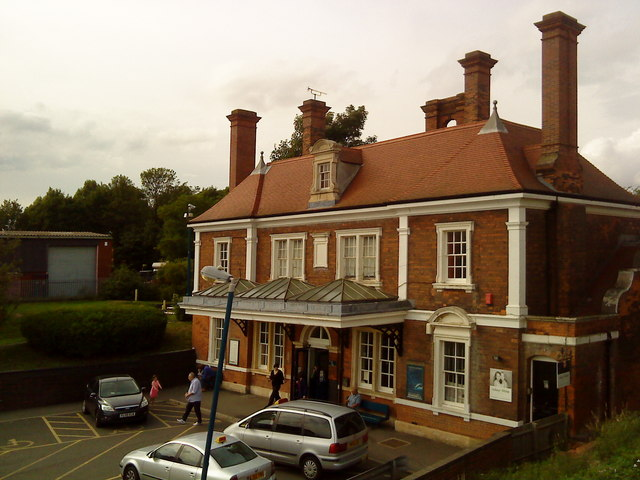
Market Harborough railway station

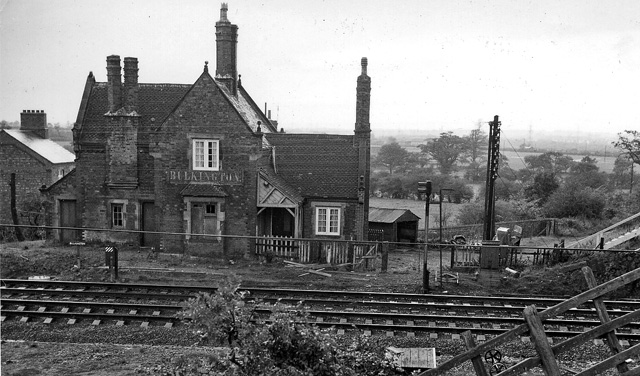
Bulkington railway station
