= Bridge Street =

Bridge Street may refer to:

== Streets ==
- Bridge Street (EastEnders), a street in the fictional London borough of Walford, in the soap opera EastEnders
- Bridge Street, Aberdeen, Scotland; see Union Terrace, Aberdeen
- Bridge Street, Banbury, England; see Hunt Edmunds
- Bridge Street, Cambridge, England
- Bridge Street, Dublin, Ireland; see Streets and squares in Dublin
- Bridge Street, London, England; see Parliamentary Estate
- Bridge Street (Manhattan), New York City, U.S.
- Bridge Street, Montreal, Quebec, Canada; see Carleton Place
- Bridge Street, Nelson, New Zealand
- Bridge Street, Manotick, Ontario, Canada
- Bridge Street, Penang, Malaysia; Pengkalan Kota (state constituency) § History
- Bridge Street, Philadelphia, U.S.; see Bridesburg station
- Bridge Street, Reading, England
- Bridge Street, Sydney, New South Wales, Australia
- Bridge Street, Warrington, Warrington, England
- Bridge Street (Yarmouth, Maine), U.S.

== Railway stations ==
- Northampton Bridge Street railway station
- Thrapston Bridge Street railway station
- Bridge Street subway station on the Glasgow Subway

== Other uses ==
- Bridge Street, Suffolk, England, a hamlet
- Bridge Street Town Centre, Huntsville, Alabama, USA, a shopping mall

== See also ==
- Bridges Street, a street in Hong Kong
- Bridge Street Bridge (disambiguation)
