= Elton railway station =

Former railway station in Huntingdonshire, England

Coordinates: 52.5403°N 0.4105°W

Elton
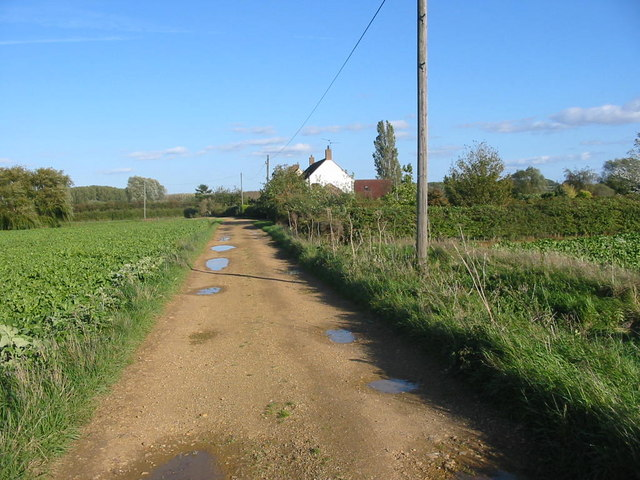
- Access road to Elton railway station, which was just beyond the cottages.

General information
- Location: Elton, Huntingdonshire; England
- Grid reference: TL079948
- Platforms: 2

Other information
- Status: Disused

History
- Original company: London and North Western Railway
- Pre-grouping: London and North Western Railway
- Post-grouping: London, Midland and Scottish Railway; London Midland Region of British Railways

Key dates
- January 1847: Station opened
- 7 December 1953: Station closed
Location

Elton railway station is a former railway station in Elton, Cambridgeshire on former Northampton and Peterborough Railway which connected Peterborough with Northampton via Wellingborough.

== History ==
The station opened in 1847 and closed in 1953 to passengers. In 1846 the line, along with the London and Birmingham, became part of the London and North Western Railway. At grouping in 1923 it became part of the London Midland and Scottish Railway.

Elton was the last station along the line before crossing the border into Northamptonshire towards Oundle.

== Route ==
Preceding station	Disused railways	Following station
Oundle	London and North Western Railway; Northampton and Peterborough Railway	Wansford
