= Roade railway station =

Former railway station in Northamptonshire, England

Coordinates: 52.157068°N 0.897062°W

Roade

General information
- Location: Roade, West Northamptonshire; England
- Grid reference: SP755515
- Platforms: 5

Other information
- Status: Disused

History
- Original company: London and Birmingham Railway
- Pre-grouping: London and North Western Railway
- Post-grouping: London Midland and Scottish Railway; London Midland Region of British Railways

Key dates
- 17 September 1838: Opened
- 1881: Relocated 220m south
- 6 July 1964: Goods facilities withdrawn
- 7 September 1964: Closed
Location

Roade was a railway station serving the Northamptonshire village of the same name on the West Coast Main Line. Roade Station opened in 1838 as the principal station for Northampton (which the main line had bypassed), but its importance diminished upon the opening of the Northampton and Peterborough Railway in 1845. The construction of the Northampton Loop Line in 1875 made Roade a junction station, and it survived until 1964.

== History ==
=== The station for Northampton ===
The London and Birmingham Railway (L&B) opened Roade station in 1838 as part of its line from London to Birmingham. Hostility to the railway in Northampton and steep gradients in the suggested route prevented the line from running through the town and so Roade was announced as its nearest station – even though the county town is some 6 miles (9.7 km) away. It lost this status in 1845 when the L&B opened a branch linking Northampton and Peterborough allowing services to run directly into Northampton from Blisworth. This had an immediate effect on Roade: the refreshment room was removed by 1865, while the daily stopping services fell to seven.

=== Northampton Loop Line ===
In 1875, the London and North Western Railway (LNWR) (which had acquired the L&B in 1846) increased the main line from Euston to four tracks as far as Roade, with the four-track line resuming onwards from Rugby. The direct route to Rugby was retained as two tracks but a two-track link to Rugby via Northampton (known as the Northampton Loop Line) was added. Roade, by then a junction for fast trains north as well as services through Northampton, saw its facilities considerably enlarged to include three platforms. In 1881, the station was resited 200m to the south of a bridge carrying the Northampton to London road over the line.

=== East and West Junction Railway ===
In 1890-91 a new east–west single-track line – the East and West Junction Railway (E&WJR) – was built across Roade and, although there was initially no connection between the two lines, the LNWR agreed to the construction of a single line connecting spur (660 yards (600 m) long) which made a junction with its main line on the down side just to the south of Roade station. The spur saw its first use on 13 April 1891 with a goods working. The spur soon became an important means of exchanging coal and minerals with the LNWR which was charging as much as £50 per half year for its use. Although the LNWR had refused a request to allow passenger services on the spur, the line did run into a bay platform at Roade. Sidings were installed at Roade in 1909 to handle the E&WJR's limestone traffic. The spur became less important with the formation of the Stratford-upon-Avon and Midland Junction Railway and the strengthening of the connection with the main line at Blisworth. The spur was eventually closed in May 1917, the southern part being retained as a siding.

=== Closure ===
Roade station was reprieved from closure in 1959 due to the efforts of local MP Sir Frank Markham, remaining open until 1964. The West Coast Main Line and Northampton Loop Line were rebuilt as a 25 kV. overhead electrified route. The footbridge and platforms were demolished but the ticket office building survived in various uses for several years until it was also demolished in 2013.

== Routes ==
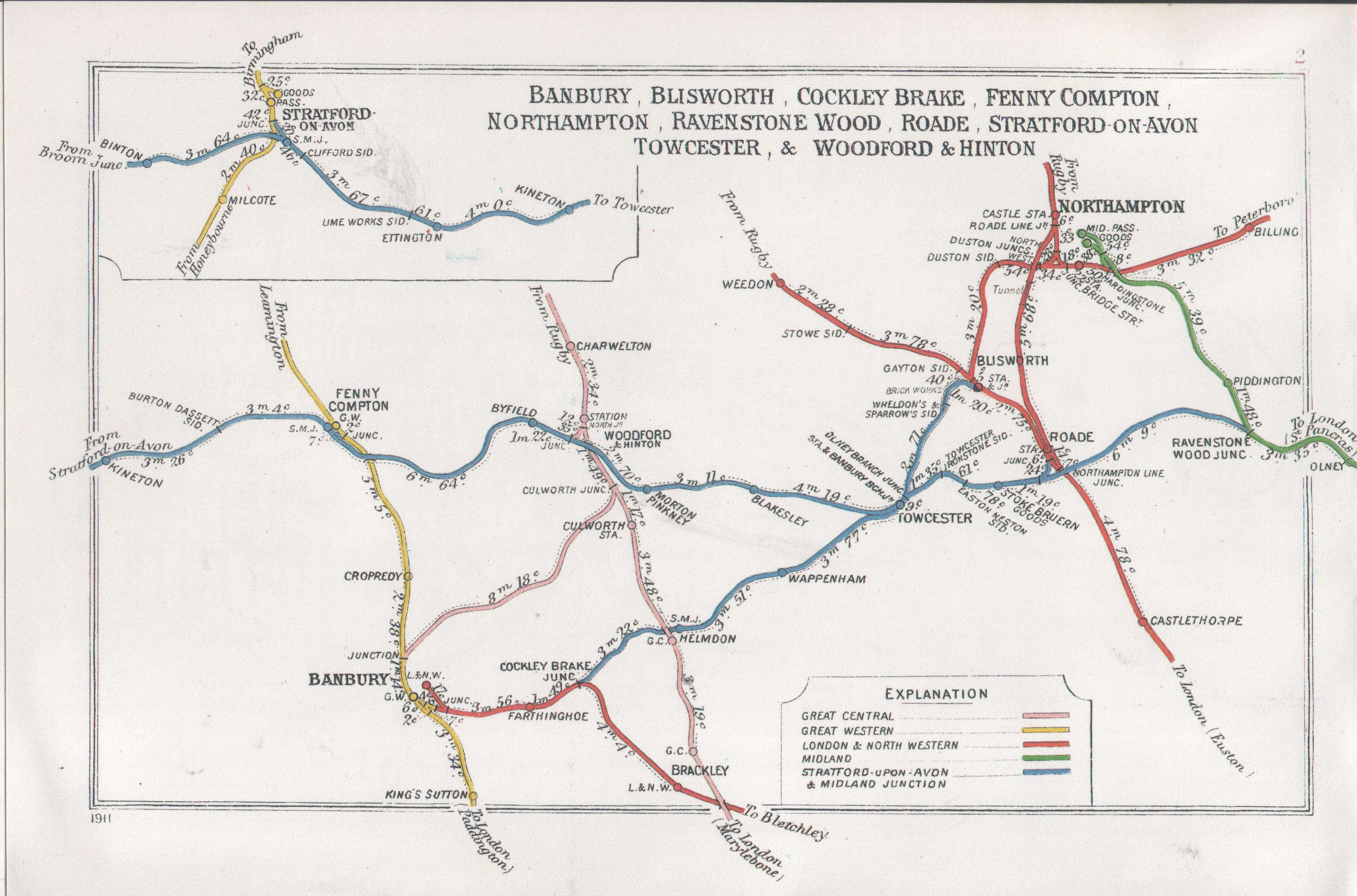
A 1911 Railway Clearing House map of railways in the vicinity of Roade (right, in red)

Preceding station	Historical railways	Following station
Northampton; Line and station open	London and North Western Railway; Northampton Loop Line	Castlethorpe; Line open, station closed
Blisworth; Line open, station closed	London and North Western Railway; West Coast Main Line	Wolverton; Line and station open
	Disused railways	
Stoke Bruern; Line and station closed	Stratford-upon-Avon and Midland Junction Railway	Terminus

== Present day ==
The West Coast Main Line runs through the site of the station, no traces remain.

== See also ==
- Roade cutting
