= Barnwell railway station =

Former railway station in Northamptonshire, England

Coordinates: 52.45295°N 0.46218°W

Barnwell
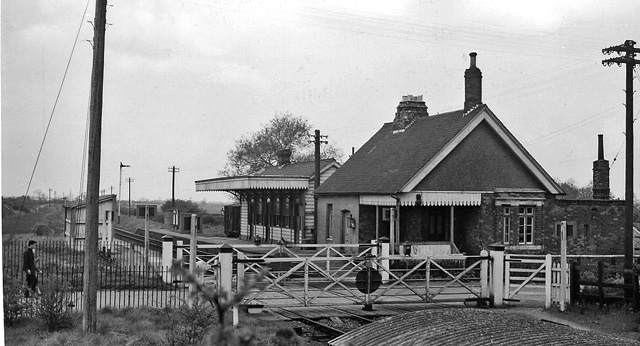
- Barnwell railway station in 1961

General information
- Location: Barnwell, North Northamptonshire; England
- Grid reference: TL046850
- Platforms: 2

Other information
- Status: Disused

History
- Original company: London and Birmingham Railway
- Pre-grouping: London and North Western Railway
- Post-grouping: London, Midland and Scottish Railway; London Midland Region of British Railways

Key dates
- 2 June 1845: Station opened
- 4 May 1964: Station closed to passengers and goods
Location

Barnwell railway station is a former railway station in Barnwell, Northamptonshire on the former Northampton and Peterborough Railway line which connected Peterborough and Northampton.

The station buildings were designed by the architect John William Livock.

In 1846 the line, along with the London and Birmingham, became part of the London and North Western Railway. At grouping in 1923 it became part of the London Midland and Scottish Railway.

== Gallery ==
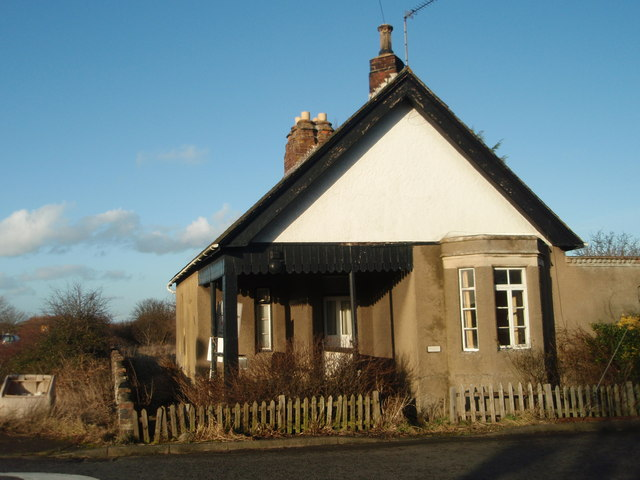
Ticket office/station masters house

== The former service ==
The service was from Peterborough to Northampton via Wellingborough. The station opened in 1845 and closed in 1964 to passengers. The stationmaster's house still stands as a private residence.

The wooden waiting room on the platform was moved from Barnwell to Wansford station on the preserved Nene Valley Railway on 5 April 1977. The building is of typical LNWR wooden construction. It was originally built in 1884 for use by members of the royal family when visiting Barnwell Manor, home of the Duke of Buccleuch.

Preceding station	Disused railways	Following station
Thorpe	London and North Western Railway; Northampton and Peterborough Railway	Oundle
