= Oundle railway station =

Former railway station in Northamptonshire, England

Coordinates: 52.4889°N 0.4602°W

Oundle
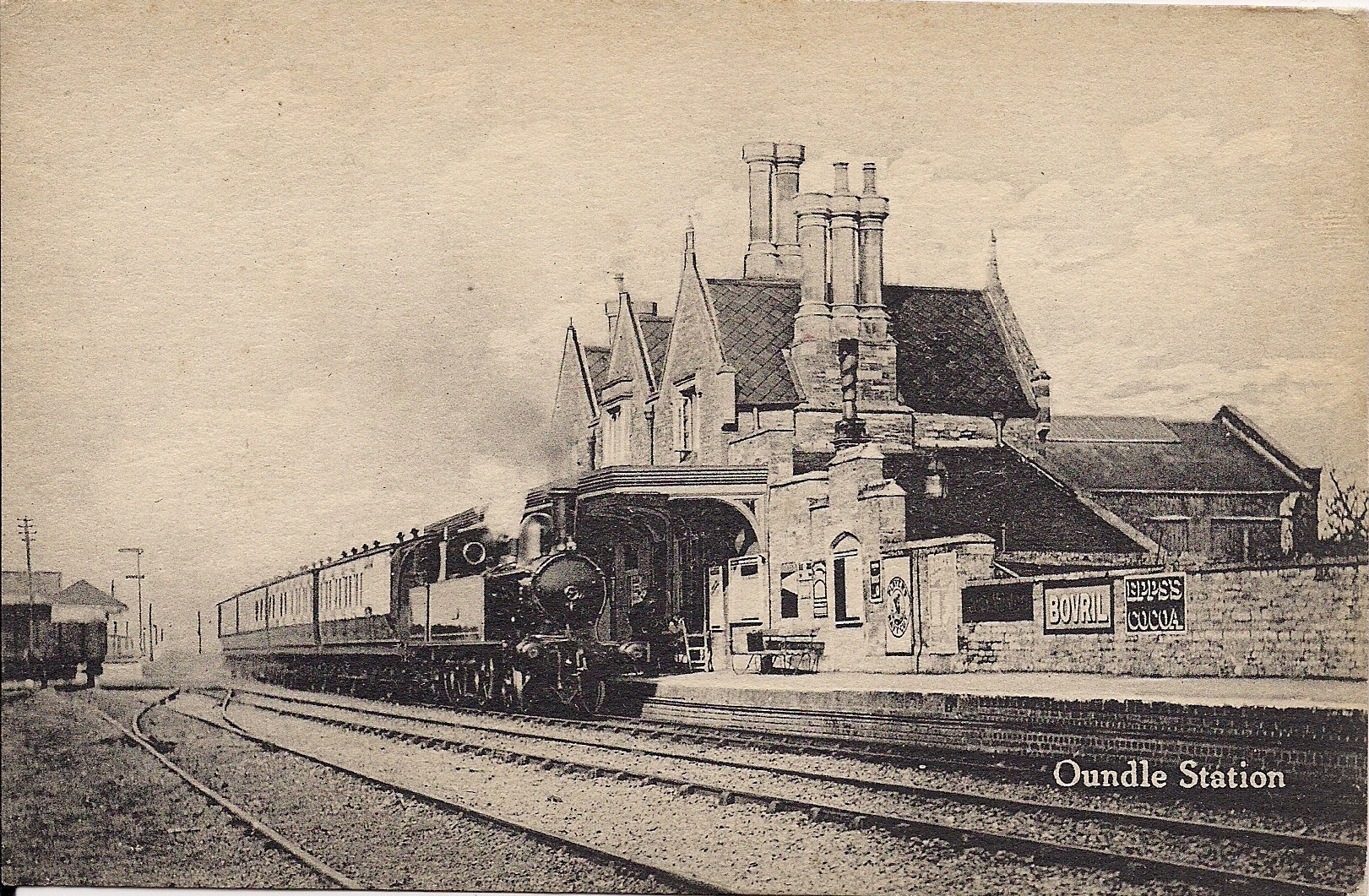

General information
- Location: Oundle, Northamptonshire; England
- Grid reference: TL046890
- Platforms: 2

Other information
- Status: Disused

History
- Original company: London and Birmingham Railway
- Pre-grouping: London and North Western Railway
- Post-grouping: London, Midland and Scottish Railway; London Midland Region of British Railways

Key dates
- 2 June 1845: Station opened
- 4 May 1964: End of regular timetabled services
- 6 November 1972: Definitive closure

Listed Building – Grade II
- Feature: Oundle Railway Station
- Designated: 18 February 1987
- Reference no.: 1040279
Location

Oundle railway station is a Grade II listed former railway station in Oundle, Northamptonshire on the former Northampton and Peterborough Railway line which connected Peterborough and Northampton. In 1846 the line, along with the London and Birmingham, became part of the London and North Western Railway. At grouping in 1923 it became part of the London Midland and Scottish Railway.

== History ==
The stations on this line were probably the most extravagant of any. They were designed by John William Livock and constructed in the Jacobean style from local stone. Originally the line was single and the Station house was of two stories with three gable ends facing on to the platform. The line was doubled in 1846 and a second platform contained simply a waiting room.

In common with stations built on this line at this time the sidings on either side were accessed by wagon turntables connected by a line across the running lines at right angles to them. The platforms were offset and this line ran between them, with a large goods shed adjacent to the main building. Later a further running line was added in the Peterborough direction and more sidings were added curving away into a new goods yard, using double slips off the running lines.

Initially there were three trains a day, rising to six by 1883. Since the station lay outside the town an omnibus or post horse could be hired from the Talbot Hotel. At grouping in 1923 it became part of the London Midland and Scottish Railway.

Oundle was also the location of a substantial boarding school and special trains ran even after regular timetabled services finished in 1964. British Railways finally closed the line in November 1972.

The section from Wansford to Yarwell Junction was taken over by the Nene Valley Railway, but not as far as Oundle. So the rails were lifted in the 1970s. The NVR nonetheless has aspirations to extend the Heritage line by six miles to a new Oundle terminus station.

Preceding station	Disused railways	Following station
Barnwell	London and North Western Railway; Northampton and Peterborough Railway	Elton
