= Armitage railway station =

Former railway station in Staffordshire, England

Armitage
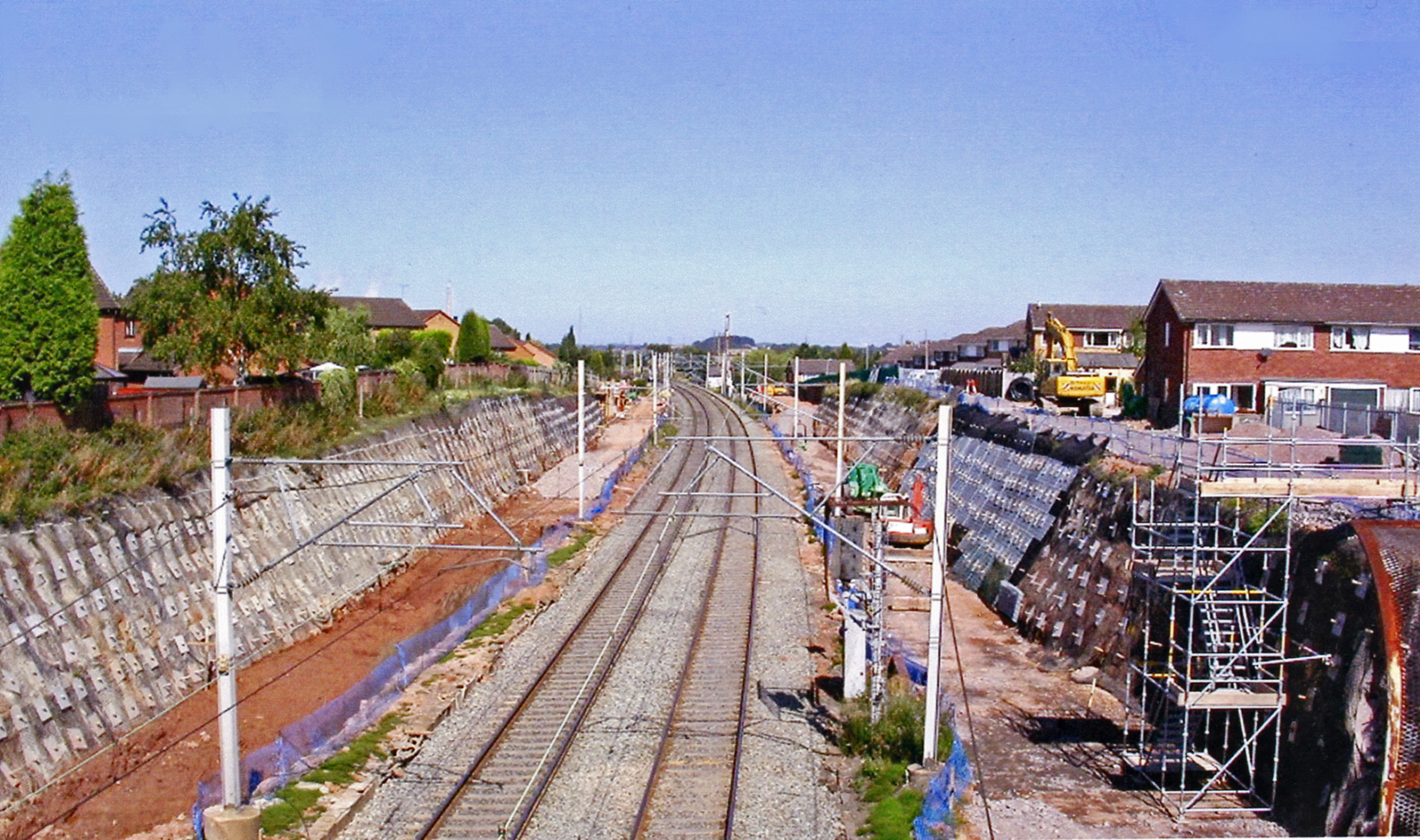
- The site of the station in 2006

General information
- Location: Armitage, Lichfield; England
- Coordinates: 52.7406°N 1.8697°W
- Grid reference: SK087159
- Platforms: 2

Other information
- Status: Disused

History
- Original company: London and North Western Railway
- Pre-grouping: London and North Western Railway
- Post-grouping: London Midland and Scottish Railway

Key dates
- 1 December 1847: Station opens
- 13 June 1960: Station closes
Location

Armitage railway station was a station on the Trent Valley Line, part of what is now known as the West Coast Main Line, and served the village of Armitage, Staffordshire, England.

== History ==
The station was opened in 1847 by the London and North Western Railway, and was absorbed by the London Midland and Scottish Railway during the Grouping of 1923. The station passed on to the London Midland Region of British Railways on nationalisation in 1948. It was closed by the British Transport Commission in 1960.

== The site today ==
The line through the station, which was located between the present stations at Lichfield and Rugeley is still part of the now electrified WCML.

Preceding station	Historical railways	Following station
Lichfield Trent Valley	London Midland and Scottish Railway; London and North Western Railway	Rugeley Trent Valley
