= Wellingborough London Road railway station =

Former railway station in Northamptonshire, England

Coordinates: 52.2890°N 0.6789°W

Wellingborough London Road
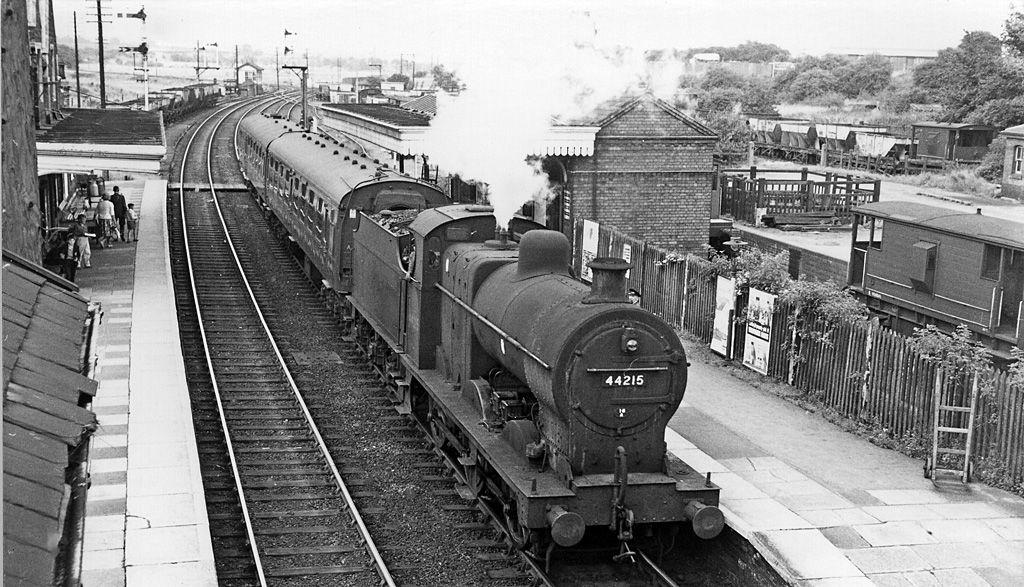
- A Peterborough - Northampton train in 1962

General information
- Location: Wellingborough, North Northamptonshire; England
- Grid reference: SP902665
- Platforms: 2

Other information
- Status: Disused

History
- Original company: London and Birmingham Railway
- Pre-grouping: London and North Western Railway
- Post-grouping: London, Midland and Scottish Railway; London Midland Region of British Railways

Key dates
- 2 June 1845: Opened (Wellingborough)
- 16 July 1924: Renamed (Wellingborough London Road)
- 4 May 1964: Closed to passengers
- 7 November 1966: Station closed to goods
Location

Wellingborough London Road railway station is a former railway station in Wellingborough, Northamptonshire on a line which connected Peterborough and Northampton.

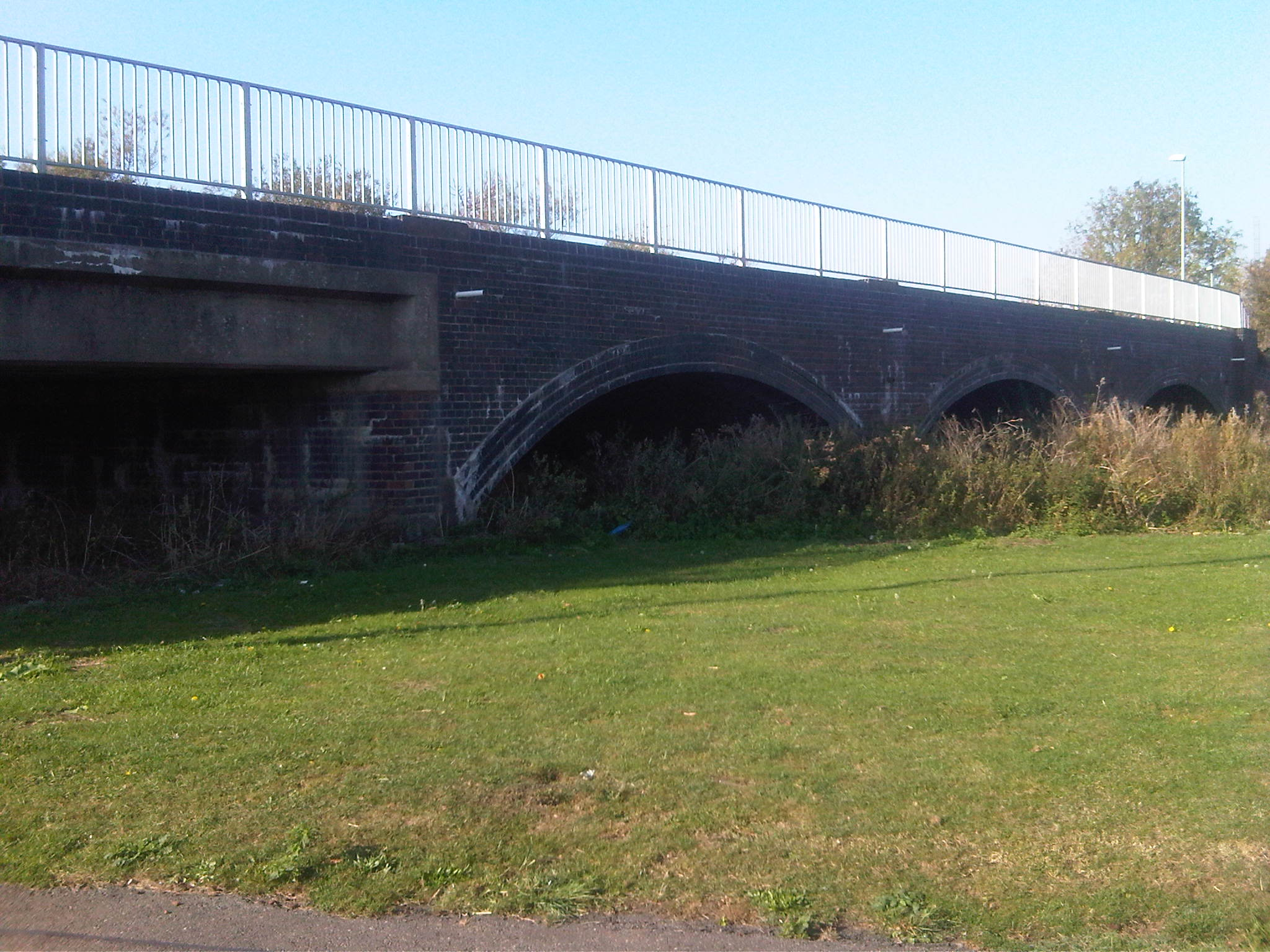
The former Wellingborough London Road railway bridge over the River Nene is now a footbridge.

== History ==
The station opened in 1845 and closed in 1964 to passengers and closed fully in 1966.

== Stationmasters ==
- Henry Cooper 1850 - 1853
- J.V. Jarrett 1853 - 1856 (afterwards station master at Leighton Buzzard)
- T.B. Dixon 1856 - 1861 (formerly station master at Market Harborough, afterwards station master at Leighton Buzzard)
- John Green 1861 - 1896
- William Henry Judge 1896 - 1898 (afterwards station master at Market Harborough)
- William Jackson 1898 - 1902 (afterwards station master at Higham Ferrers)
- David Horne 1902 - 1920 (formerly station master at Higham Ferrers)
- Horace Edward Neale 1920 - ca. 1923

From 1930 the station master was in charge of both the Midland Road and London Road stations.

== Location ==
This station was on an important junction with a link to the Midland Main Line at Wellingborough Midland Road which enabled through running from Northampton to Midland Road, Kettering and Leicester. The station remains have gone with the line ending under the A45.

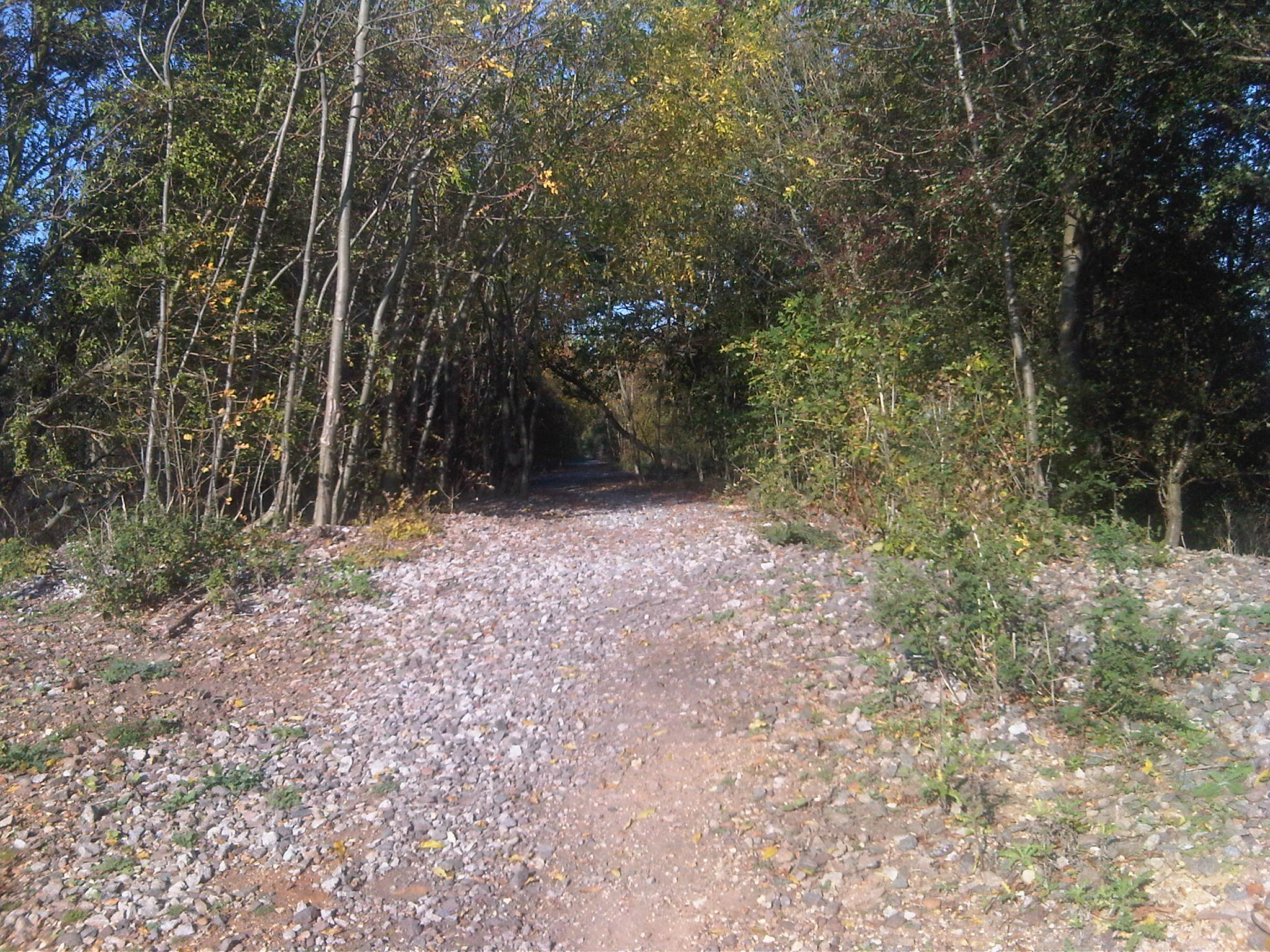
The former Wellingborough London Road railway track location.

== The former service ==
The service was from Peterborough to Northampton via Wellingborough.

Preceding station	Disused railways	Following station
Castle Ashby & Earls Barton; Line and station closed	London and North Western Railway; Northampton and Peterborough Railway	Ditchford; Line and station closed
Castle Ashby & Earls Barton; Line and station closed	London and North Western Railway; Northampton and Peterborough Railway	Wellingborough Midland Road; Line closed, station open

== See also ==
- Wellingborough
- Wellingborough railway station
- London and Birmingham Railway
