= Thorpe railway station =

Former railway station in Northamptonshire, England

Coordinates: 52.4203°N 0.4967°W

Thorpe
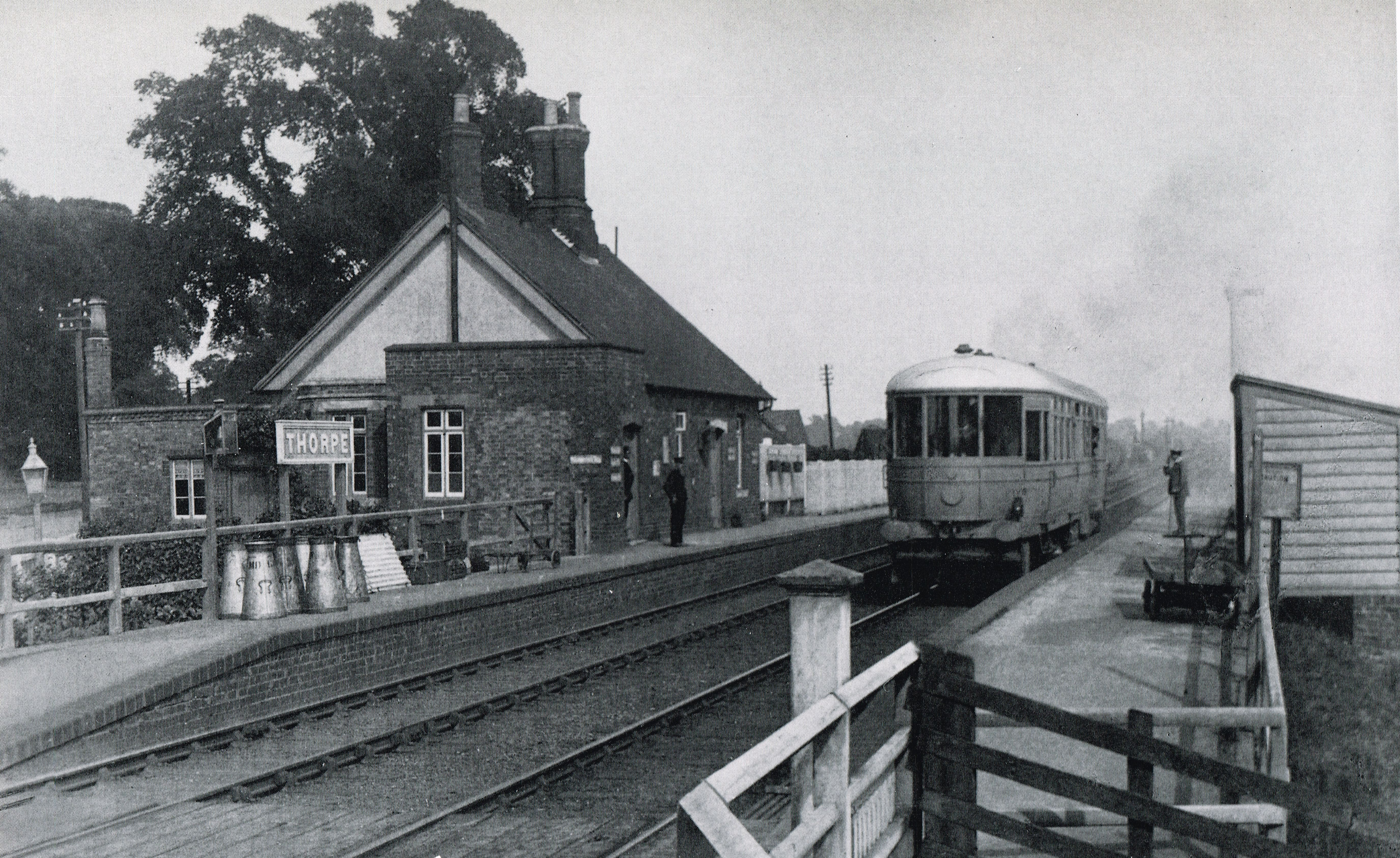

General information
- Location: Thorpe Waterville, Northamptonshire; England
- Grid reference: TL023813
- Platforms: 2

Other information
- Status: Disused

History
- Original company: London and Birmingham Railway
- Pre-grouping: London and North Western Railway
- Post-grouping: London, Midland and Scottish Railway; London Midland Region of British Railways

Key dates
- 2 June 1845: Station opened
- 4 May 1964: Station closed to goods and passengers
Location

Thorpe railway station is a former railway station in Thorpe Waterville, Northamptonshire on the former Northampton and Peterborough Railway line which connected Peterborough and Northampton.

In 1846 the line, along with the London and Birmingham, became part of the London and North Western Railway. At grouping in 1923 it became part of the London Midland and Scottish Railway. The station closed in 1964 to passengers.

Former Services

Preceding station	Disused railways	Following station
Thrapston Bridge Street	London and North Western Railway; Northampton and Peterborough Railway	Barnwell
