= Thrapston Bridge Street railway station =

Former railway station in Northamptonshire, England

Coordinates: 52.3972°N 0.5421°W

Thrapston Bridge Street
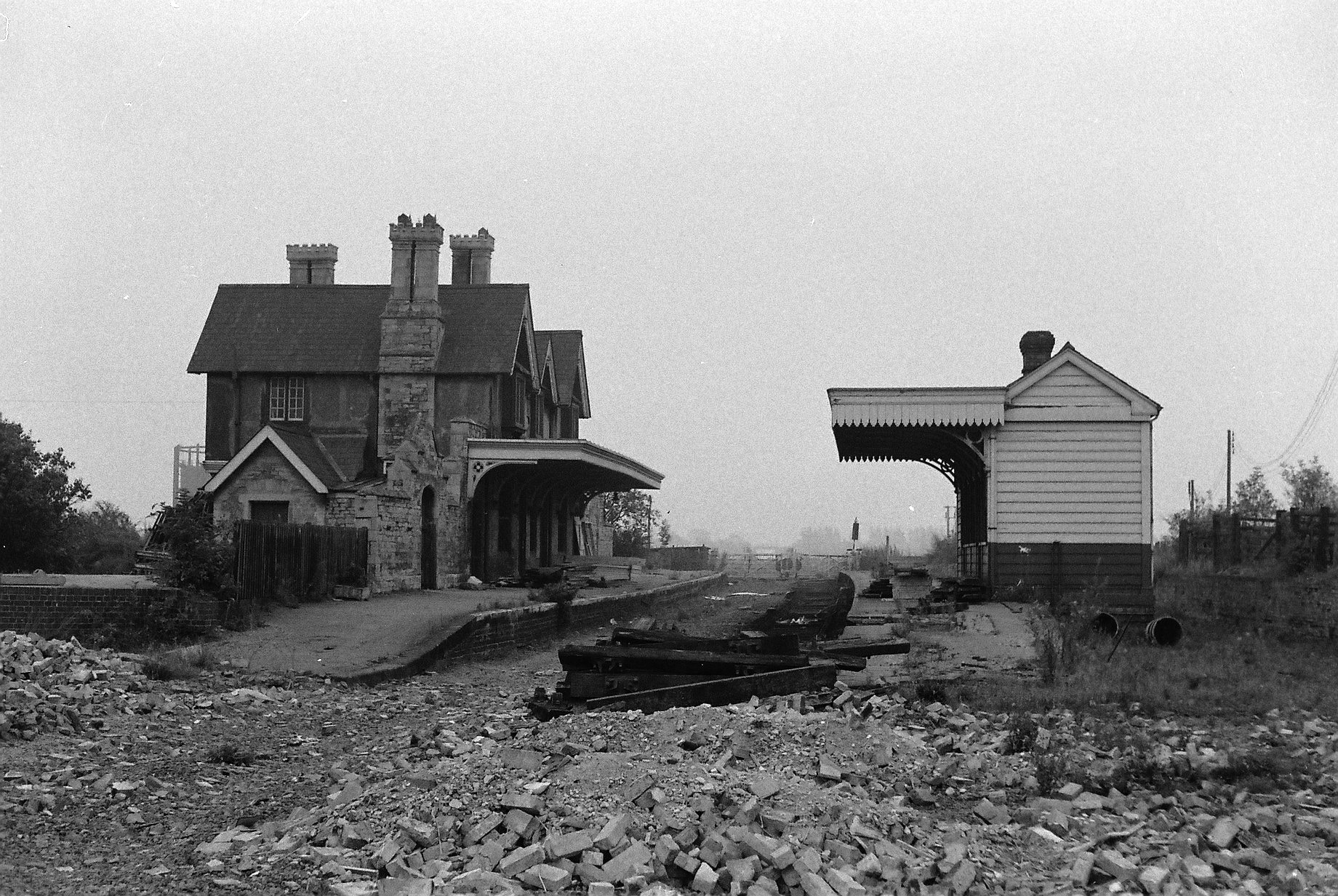
- Station in 1966.

General information
- Location: Thrapston, North Northamptonshire; England
- Grid reference: SP993787
- Platforms: 2

Other information
- Status: Disused

History
- Original company: London and Birmingham Railway
- Pre-grouping: London and North Western Railway
- Post-grouping: London, Midland and Scottish Railway; London Midland Region of British Railways

Key dates
- 2 June 1845: Station opened as Thrapston
- 2 June 1924: Renamed Thrapston Bridge Street
- 4 May 1964: Station closed to passengers
- 6 June 1965: Station closed to goods
Location

Thrapston Bridge Street railway station is a former railway station in Thrapston, Northamptonshire on the former Northampton and Peterborough Railway line which connected Peterborough and Northampton.

The station buildings were designed by the architect John William Livock.

The station opened in 1845 and a year later the line, along with the London and Birmingham, became part of the London and North Western Railway. At grouping in 1923 it became part of the London Midland and Scottish Railway. The station closed with the line in 1964.

Former Services

| Preceding station | Disused railways | Following station |
|---|---|---|
| Ringstead & Addington | London and North Western Railway; Northampton and Peterborough Railway | Thorpe |
