= Castle Ashby & Earls Barton railway station =

Former railway station in Northamptonshire, England

Coordinates: 52.24767°N 0.74175°W

Castle Ashby & Earls Barton
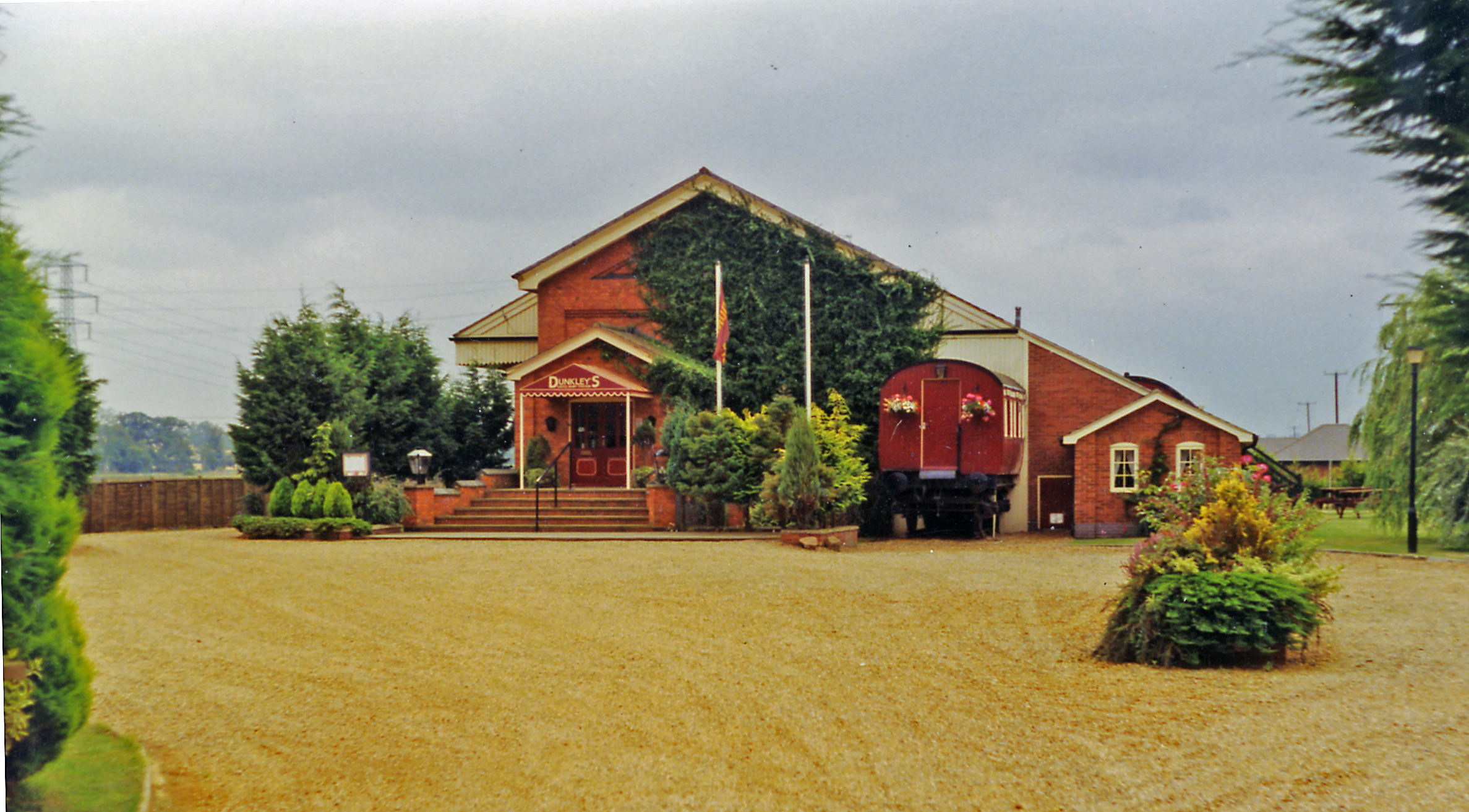
- Site of the station in 1993

General information
- Location: nr Whiston, West Northamptonshire; England
- Grid reference: SP860618
- Platforms: 2

Other information
- Status: Disused

History
- Original company: London and Birmingham Railway
- Pre-grouping: London and North Western Railway
- Post-grouping: London, Midland and Scottish Railway; London Midland Region of British Railways

Key dates
- 2 June 1845: Station opened as Castle Ashby (White Mill)
- May 1869: Renamed
- 4 May 1964: Station closed to passengers
- 1 February 1965: Station closed to goods
Location

Castle Ashby & Earls Barton railway station is a former railway station in Northamptonshire on the former Northampton and Peterborough Railway, a line which connected Peterborough and Northampton.

In 1846 the line, along with the London and Birmingham, became part of the London and North Western Railway. At grouping in 1923 it became part of the London Midland and Scottish Railway.

== Present day ==
The station's goods buildings remained open as a restaurant known as Dunkleys. It features two carriages which are visible from the road linking Earls Barton and Castle Ashby. Dunkleys has now closed down and the site has been developed for residential dwellings.

Former Services

Preceding station	Disused railways	Following station
Billing	London and North Western Railway; Northampton and Peterborough Railway	Wellingborough London Road
