= Northampton Bridge Street railway station =

Former railway station in Northamptonshire, England

Coordinates: 52.2290°N 0.8975°W

Northampton Bridge Street
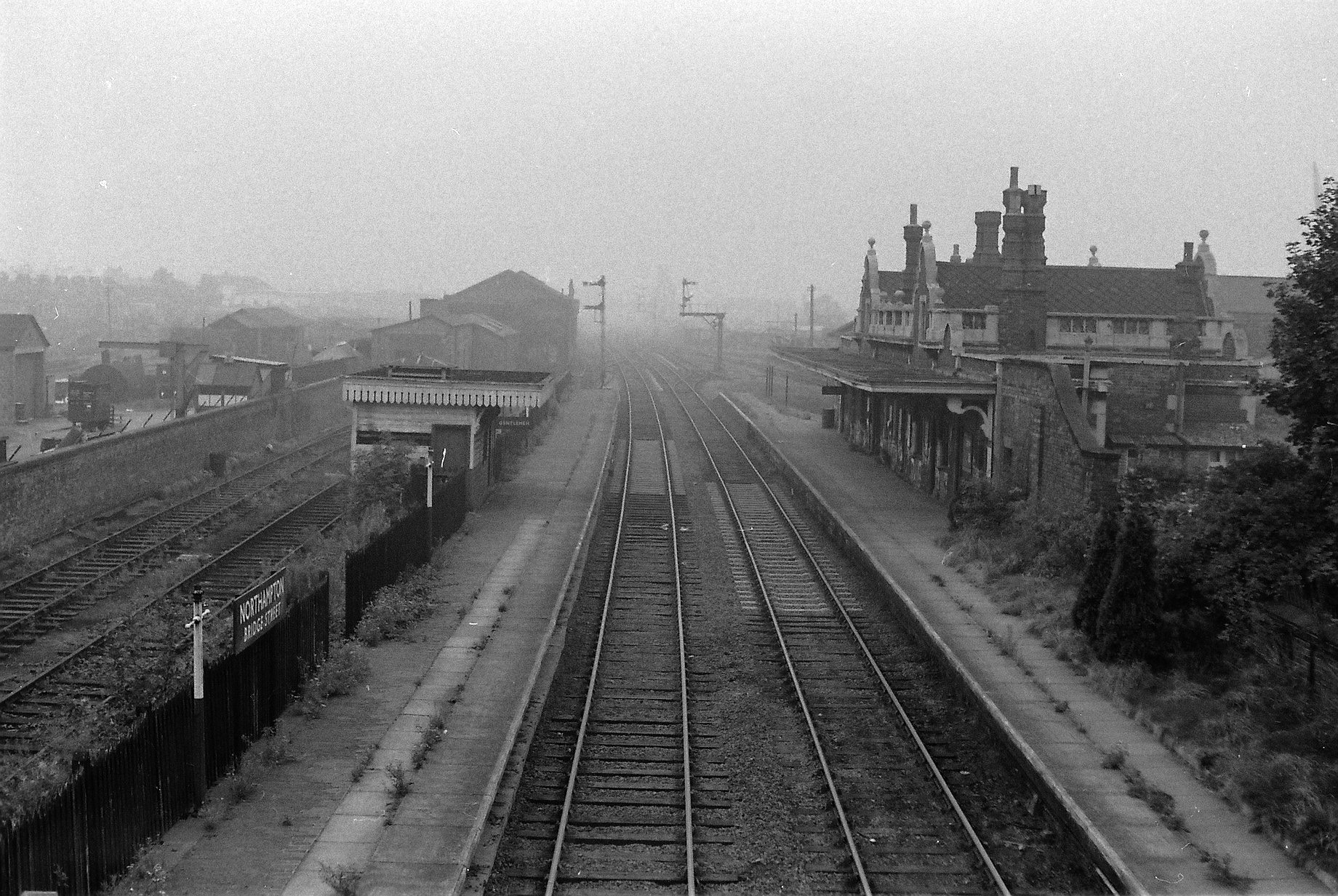
- Station in 1966

General information
- Location: Far Cotton, Northampton, Northampton; England
- Platforms: 2

Other information
- Status: Disused

History
- Original company: London and Birmingham Railway
- Pre-grouping: London and North Western Railway
- Post-grouping: London, Midland and Scottish Railway; London Midland Region of British Railways

Key dates
- 13 May 1845: Opened as Northampton
- June 1876: Station renamed Northampton Bridge Street
- 4 May 1964: Station closed to passengers
- 1972: Station closed to freight
- 2005: Last sidings by the station closed
Location

Northampton Bridge Street is a former railway station in Northampton, the main town of Northamptonshire, on the Northampton and Peterborough Railway which connected Peterborough and Northampton.

== History ==
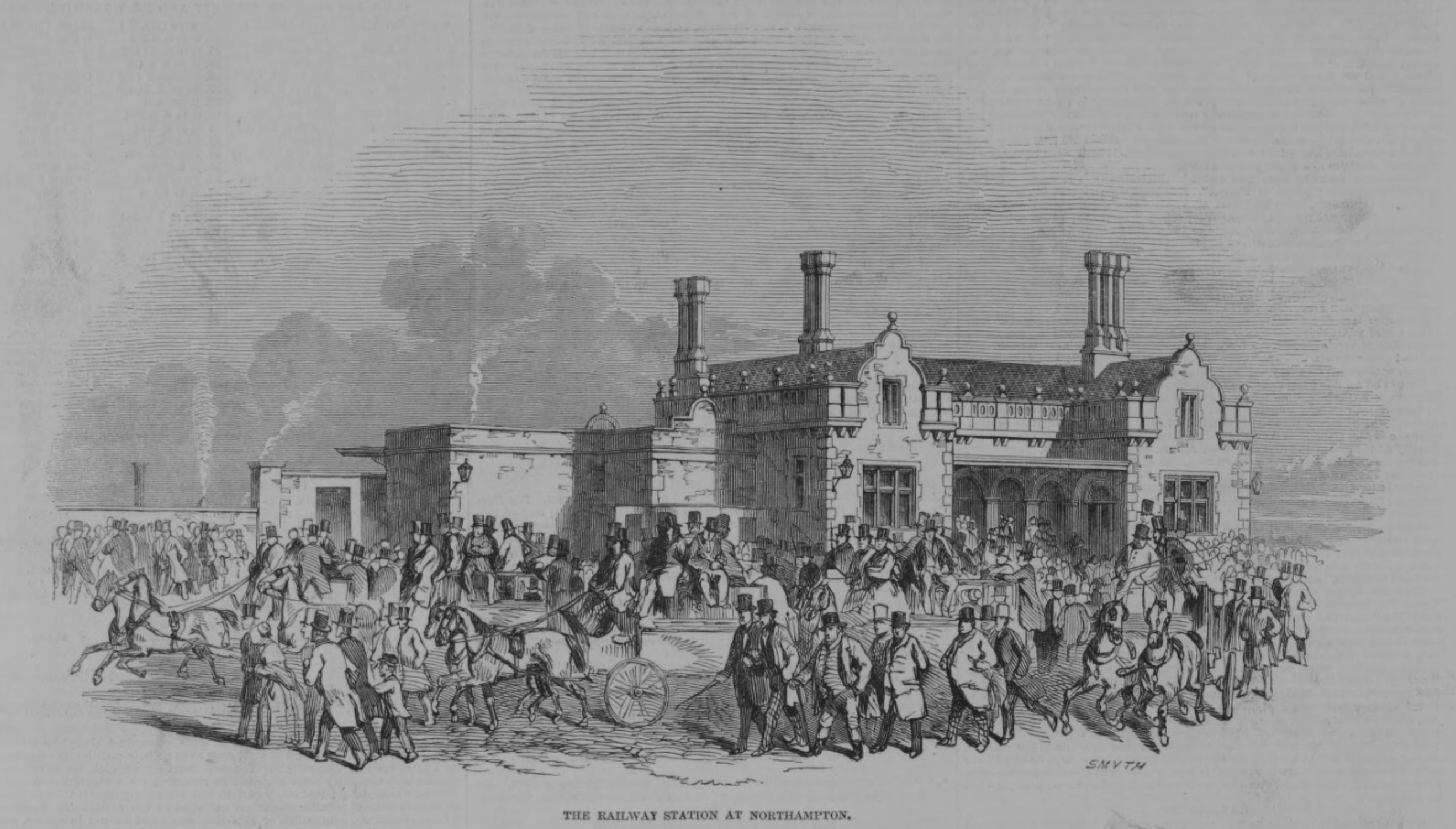
From The Illustrated London News, 24 July 1847

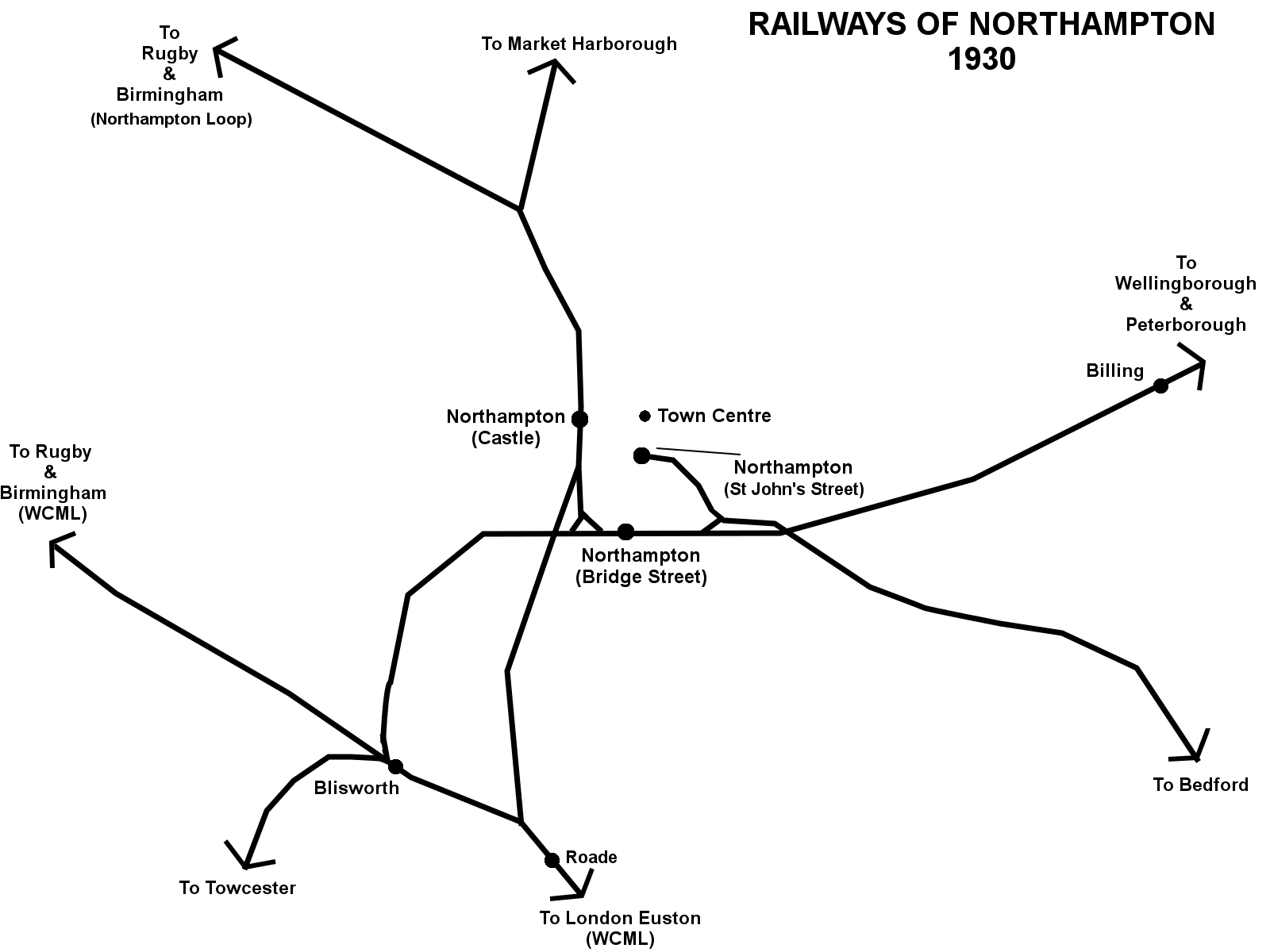
Map of railways in the vicinity of Northampton in 1930

Originally named Northampton, this was the first station serving the town. It opened in 1845, with buildings designed by architect John William Livock. The service was from Peterborough to Northampton via Wellingborough. It was renamed Northampton Bridge Street in 1876, after a new station was built for the line to Market Harborough. The station meant that people could travel to Wellingborough, Irthlingborough and Peterborough more quickly than before.

The station closed to passengers in 1964, the buildings being demolished in 1969. Freight trains continued to use Bridge Street regularly until 1972; a lone remaining group of corporate sidings finally closed in 2005.

=== Stationmasters ===
- William Young until 1848
- Robert Snape 1848 - 1852
- Charles Livock 1853 - 1871 (formerly station master at Weedon, afterwards station master at Rugby)
- J. Webster 1871 - 1874 (formerly station master at Tamworth)
- Charles Livock 1874 - 1875 (formerly station master at Rugby
- George Norris 1875 - 1880
- J. Mellor 1880 - 1882
- George William Teat 1882 - 1890
- G. Gauntley 1890 - 1897
- John Edwin Widdowson 1897 - 1898 (afterwards station master at Northampton Castle)
- Henry Burrell ca. 1899
- Edward Burrell 1900 - 1907
- William Smith 1908 - 1913
- Philip Haines 1913 - 1920 (formerly night station master at Northampton Castle)
- J. Bentham 1928 - 1931 (also station master at Northampton Castle)
- F.C. O’Connor 1932 - 1937 (also station master at Northampton Castle, afterwards station master at Sheffield)
- Henry Preston 1937 - 1941 (formerly station master at Luton, also station master at Northampton Castle)
- Arthur Hill 1941 - 1944 (formerly station master at Upminster, also station master at Northampton Castle, afterwards station master at Wigan)
- Bertie Hill 1944 - 1953 (brother of the previous station master, also station master at Northampton Castle)
- Benjamin Blackburn from 1953 (formerly station master at Gourock, also station master of Northampton Castle, afterwards station master at Bolton Trinity)
- A.S. Harcourt from 1962 (also station master at Northampton Castle)

=== Former services ===
Preceding station	Disused railways	Following station
Blisworth	London and North Western Railway; Northampton and Peterborough Railway	Billing
Northampton (Castle)	London and North Western Railway; Northampton to Market Harborough line	Terminus

== Today's usage ==
The actual station was between the Old Towcester Road and the line; this land is now a housing development.

The line still runs past the station site, although the line past the level crossing has been de-commissioned and is likely to become a road/cycle/walking route [NBC CAAP 2013].

There is still a Network Rail depot on the south side of the line, which includes an old LNWR shed.

== Future plans ==
On 22 October 2013, the West Northamptonshire Development Corporation announced that it had agreed to purchase the disused Northampton Bridge Street branch line from Network Rail for £1.5 million to create a two-mile (3 km) cycle and pedestrian path linking the Brackmills Industrial Estate to the Northampton Enterprise Zone.

== See also ==
- Northampton
- Northampton railway station
- London and Birmingham Railway
