= Ringstead and Addington railway station =

Former railway station in Northamptonshire, England

Coordinates: 52.3597°N 0.5772°W

Ringstead & Addington

General information
- Location: Great Addington, Ringstead, North Northamptonshire; England
- Grid reference: SP970744
- Platforms: 2

Other information
- Status: Disused

History
- Original company: London and Birmingham Railway
- Pre-grouping: London and North Western Railway
- Post-grouping: London, Midland and Scottish Railway; London Midland Region of British Railways

Key dates
- 2 June 1845: Station opened as Ringstead
- 1 April 1898: Renamed Ringstead & Addington
- 2 March 1964: Station closed to goods
- 4 May 1964: Station closed to passengers
Location

Ringstead and Addington railway station was a railway station serving Great and Little Addington and Ringstead in Northamptonshire on the former Northampton and Peterborough Railway which connected Peterborough and Northampton.

In 1846 the line, along with the London and Birmingham, became part of the London and North Western Railway. At grouping in 1923 it became part of the London Midland and Scottish Railway.

It was notable that the approach from Addington was partly across stepping stones made from former railway sleeper blocks. This still remains although covered in overgrowth.

== The former service ==
The service was from Peterborough to Northampton via Wellingborough. The station opened in 1845 and closed in 1964 to passengers.

Former Services

Preceding station	Disused railways	Following station
Irthlingborough	London and North Western Railway; Northampton and Peterborough Railway	Thrapston Bridge Street
