= Bridge Street Bridge =

Bridge Street Bridge may refer to:

- Bridge Street Bridge (Newark)
- Bridge Street Bridge (Trenton)
- Bridge Street Bridge (Connecticut River)
- Bridge Street Bridge (Elkhart, Indiana)
- Bridge Street Bridge (Portland, Michigan)
- Victoria Bridge, Montreal, the bridge at the base of Bridge Street
