= Ditchford railway station =

Former railway station in Northamptonshire, England

Coordinates: 52.3060°N 0.6373°W

Ditchford

General information
- Location: Irthlingborough, North Northamptonshire; England
- Grid reference: SP930685
- Platforms: 2

Other information
- Status: Disused

History
- Original company: London and Birmingham Railway
- Pre-grouping: London and North Western Railway
- Post-grouping: London, Midland and Scottish Railway; London Midland Region of British Railways

Key dates
- 2 June 1845: Station opened
- 1 November 1924: Closed to regular passengers
- c. June 1952: Station closed completely
Location

Ditchford railway station is a former railway station on Ditchford Road, Northamptonshire on the former Northampton and Peterborough Railway line which connected Peterborough and Northampton.In 1846 the line, along with the London and Birmingham, became part of the London and North Western Railway.

At grouping in 1923 it became part of the London Midland and Scottish Railway.

Ditchford is famous as the locality of reputed treacle mines. The origin of this fantasy is obscure, though the station's sidings were primarily to serve a nearby ironstone quarry. For most of its existence although on the bank of the river Nene it was without mains water, which had to be brought in each day by train. The Station Master had the power to stop any train so that his family could travel to Wellingborough and its remoteness meant that it saw little business and it closed to passengers in 1924. It was occasionally used by railwaymen until 1952.

== The former service ==
The service was from Peterborough to Northampton via Wellingborough. The station opened in 1845 and closed in 1924 to passengers.

Former Services

Preceding station	Disused railways	Following station
Wellingborough London Road	London and North Western Railway; Northampton and Peterborough Railway	Irthlingborough
