= Irthlingborough railway station =

Former railway station in Northamptonshire, England

Coordinates: 52.3249°N 0.5955°W

Irthlingborough
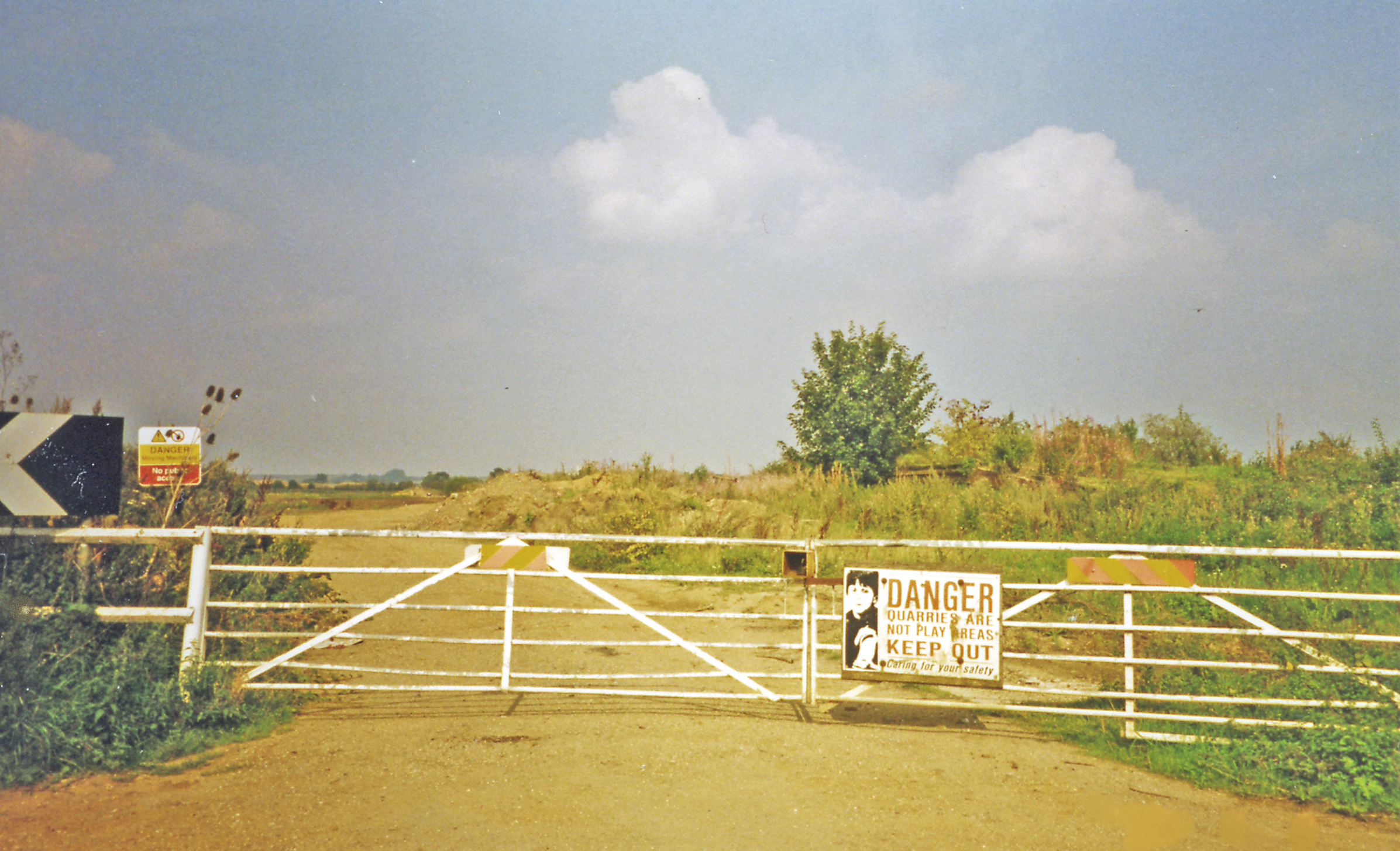
- The site of the station in 2002

General information
- Location: Irthlingborough, North Northamptonshire; England
- Grid reference: SP958706
- Platforms: 2

Other information
- Status: Disused

History
- Original company: London and Birmingham Railway
- Pre-grouping: London and North Western Railway
- Post-grouping: London, Midland and Scottish Railway; London Midland Region of British Railways

Key dates
- 2 June 1845: Opened as Higham Ferrers
- 28 April 1885: Renamed Higham Ferrers and Irthlingborough
- 1 October 1910: Renamed Irthlingborough
- 4 May 1964: Station closed to passengers
- 6 June 1966: Station closed to goods
Location

Irthlingborough railway station is a former railway station in Irthlingborough, Northamptonshire, on the former Northampton and Peterborough Railway line which connected Peterborough and Northampton. In 1846 the line, along with the London and Birmingham Railway, became part of the London and North Western Railway.

The station was opened by the London and Birmingham Railway on 2 June 1845, and was named Higham Ferrers. It was renamed Higham Ferrers and Irthlingborough on 28 April 1885, and renamed Irthlingborough on 1 October 1910. It was closed to passengers by British Railways on 4 May 1964.

At grouping in 1923 it became part of the London Midland and Scottish Railway.

Preceding station	Disused railways	Following station
Ditchford	London and North Western Railway; Northampton and Peterborough Railway	Ringstead and Addington
