= Northampton and Peterborough Railway =

Railway line in England

The Northampton and Peterborough Railway was an early railway promoted by the London and Birmingham Railway (L&BR) to run from a junction at Blisworth on the L&BR main line to Northampton and Peterborough, in England. The construction of the line was authorised by Parliament in 1843 and the 47 mile line opened in 1845. The line largely followed the river Nene, and for the economy of construction, it had many level crossings with intersecting roads, rather than bridges. In 1846 the L&BR joined with other companies, together forming the London and North Western Railway (LNWR).

The line ran through largely agricultural terrain, and it never developed as much as later, neighbouring main line railways. It closed to ordinary passenger traffic in 1964, and closed completely in 1972. A part of it has since been reopened as the Nene Valley Railway heritage line.

== Beginnings ==
=== First main line, and the Peterborough branch ===
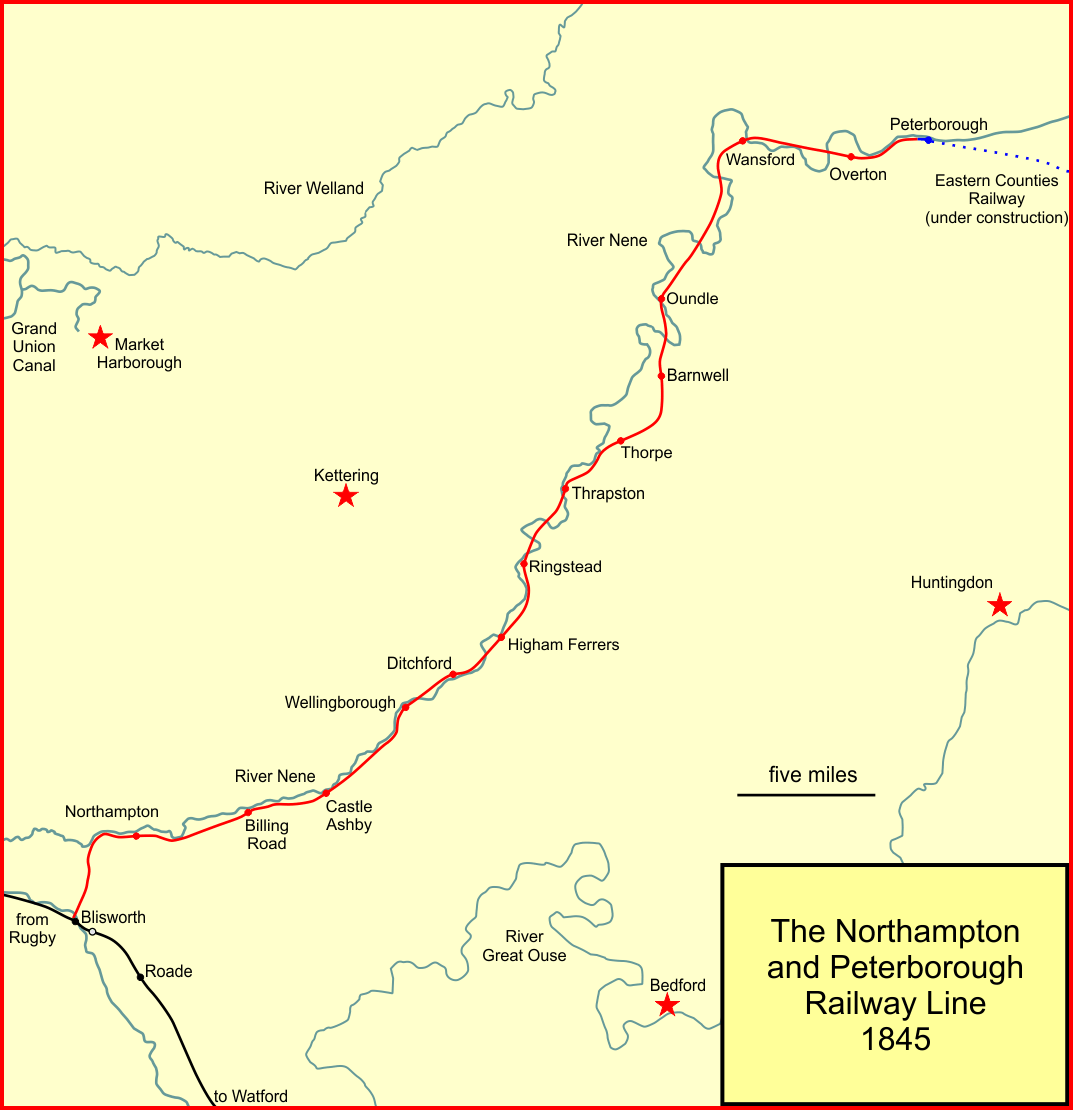
The Northampton and Peterborough branch railway in 1845

The London and Birmingham Railway (L&BR) opened its main line on 17 September 1838, passing from Roade to Rugby to the west of Northampton. The people of Northampton saw that they were at a commercial and economic disadvantage not having a railway station in their town, and following a public meeting on 8 March 1838, they petitioned the L&BR to provide a branch line to their town. After consideration the L&BR considered that a branch line from Blisworth to Northampton and Peterborough would be advantageous, by connecting Peterborough into their system, as well as the intervening agricultural terrain. Peterborough was an important and expanding regional centre, although the route from London via Blisworth would be very circuitous. At this early date the advantages of having a railway connection were so considerable, that few reflected on the lengthy and roundabout route.

London and Birmingham Railway (Northampton and Peterborough Branch) Act 1843
- Act of Parliament
- Parliament of the United Kingdom
- Long title: An Act for making a Branch Railway from the London and Birmingham Railway to Northampton and Peterborough.
- Citation: 6 & 7 Vict. c. lxiv

Dates
- Royal assent: 4 July 1843

Other legislation
- Repealed by: London and Birmingham Railway and Birmingham Canal Arrangement Act 1846

Status: Repealed

Text of statute as originally enacted

The proposal for the branch line went to the 1843 session of Parliament and the London and Birmingham Railway (Northampton and Peterborough Branch) Act 1843 (6 & 7 Vict. c. lxiv) was passed on 4 July 1843. Robert Stephenson was the engineer of the line; work started in March 1844. The line was to leave the L&BR main line at Blisworth and descend considerably to Northampton. After that the line was to follow the River Nene on an easy alignment all the way to Peterborough. Stephenson's design involved 26 level crossings, 13 river bridges and a short tunnel at Wansford.

At the same time the Eastern Counties Railway was building a branch line from Ely to Peterborough. The Great Northern Railway had not yet been formed so the possibility of a station on a north–south axis was not pursued; the ECR and the L&BR discussed building a joint station, but the ECR turned this idea down. Instead it would build a Peterborough station (and an extension of the line for 600 yards beyond it) and allow the L&BR to use it.

=== Opening and operation ===
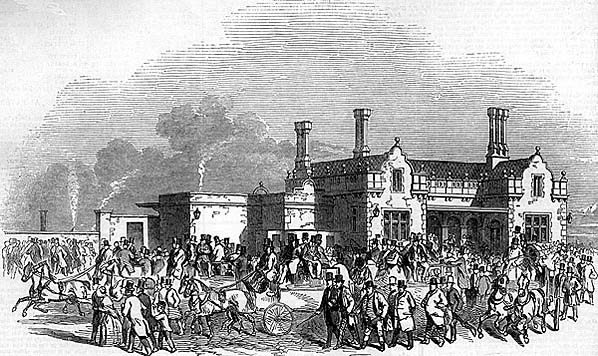
Northampton railway station in 1847

The L&BR opened its line from Blisworth to Northampton on 13 May 1845. On 31 May an inspection trip throughout the line was made by the directors; and the line to Peterborough was opened to the public on 2 June 1845. It was the first railway in Peterborough. At 47 miles in length, it had cost £429,409 to build. As the ECR had not yet opened its line, the L&BR alone was using the ECR station. These openings were for passenger traffic only; goods trains started running on 15 December 1845. Conveyance of cattle to London and other population centres was an important traffic; coal brought in was also a significant business.

Blisworth station had been built as a simple wayside station and was unsuitable as an important junction, and inconveniently located. (It was at the point where the line crosses the A43 road.) A new larger Blisworth station was built about half a mile further north-west, at the point of junction.

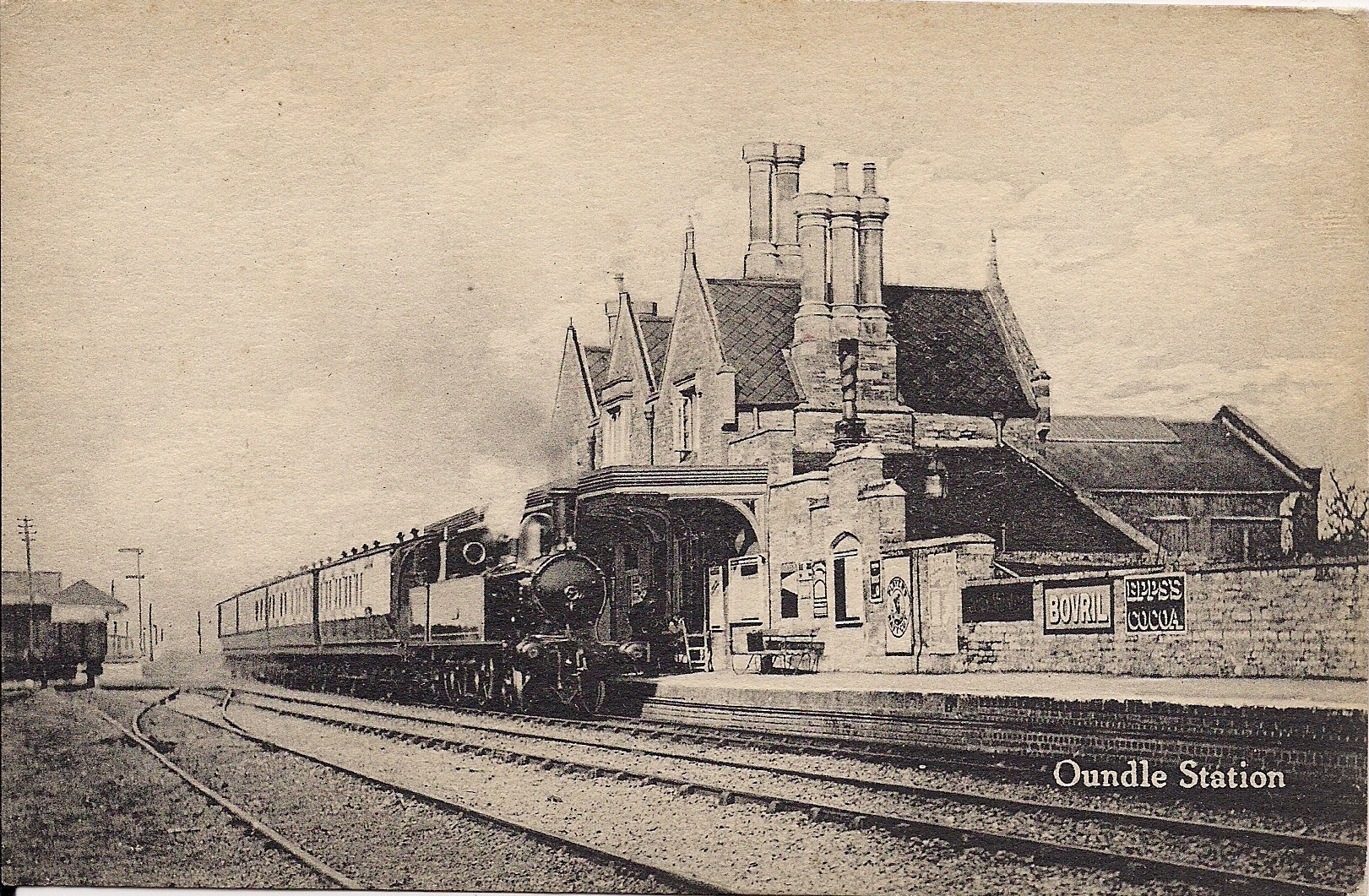
Oundle railway station

Many of the intermediate stations were built in an Old English or Tudor style from local limestone.

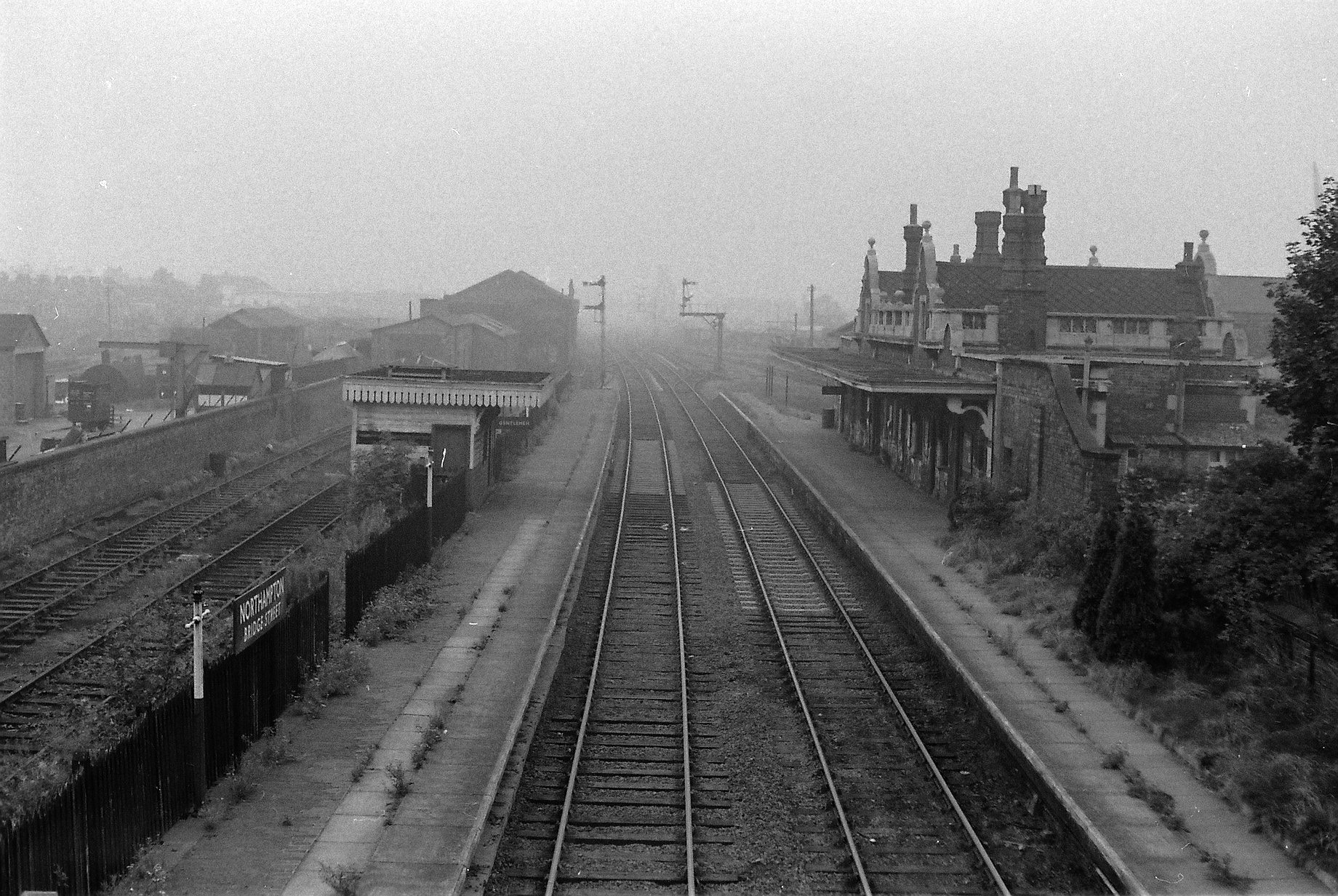
Northampton Bridge Street station in 1966

The Syston and Peterborough Railway, a dependency of the Midland Railway, was under construction at this period. There was serious difficulty with getting land for the line in the central area, and the company opened a detached section from Stamford to Peterborough. It too did not have its own station at Peterborough, and as it was remote from its parent company, it arranged that the L&BR.) would work its trains, and to use the ECR station. For a short period there was a passenger service from Ely to Stamford.

In July 1846 the L&BR was absorbed into the London and North Western Railway. Typical passenger services on the line were five trains each way, with additional shuttle services between Blisworth and Northampton. When the line was opened, it was double track from Blisworth to Northampton, and the remainder was single line with a passing place at Thrapston, about halfway. The original intention had been to operate these two halves as one-train-only sections, but this proved impractical. In fact the entire route was formed for double track, and this provision was actually started immediately after opening, and was ready by September 1846.

=== Iron ore ===
Although iron ore was known to exist along the course of the line, its extent was not fully understood at first. Colonel Arbuthnot of Woodford displayed specimens of Northamptonshire iron ore at the Great Exhibition, and some early quarrying was carried out in the Blisworth and Heyford area from 1852. New pits near Hardingstone were linked to the line by a tramway in 1851. Tramways or sidings were later laid to connect with the LNWR at Gayton, Duston, Dallington, Heyford, Brixworth, Lamport, Whiston, Earls Barton, Irchester, Irthlingborough, Ditchford, Ringstead, Denford and Orton, and transhipment sidings were laid at Blisworth Station to deal with ironstone brought in by canal from local pits.

== Connecting railways ==
The Northampton to Peterborough line was the first railway through the territory that it penetrated. Naturally later railways either crossed it or made junctions with it.

=== Peterborough and Wansford ===
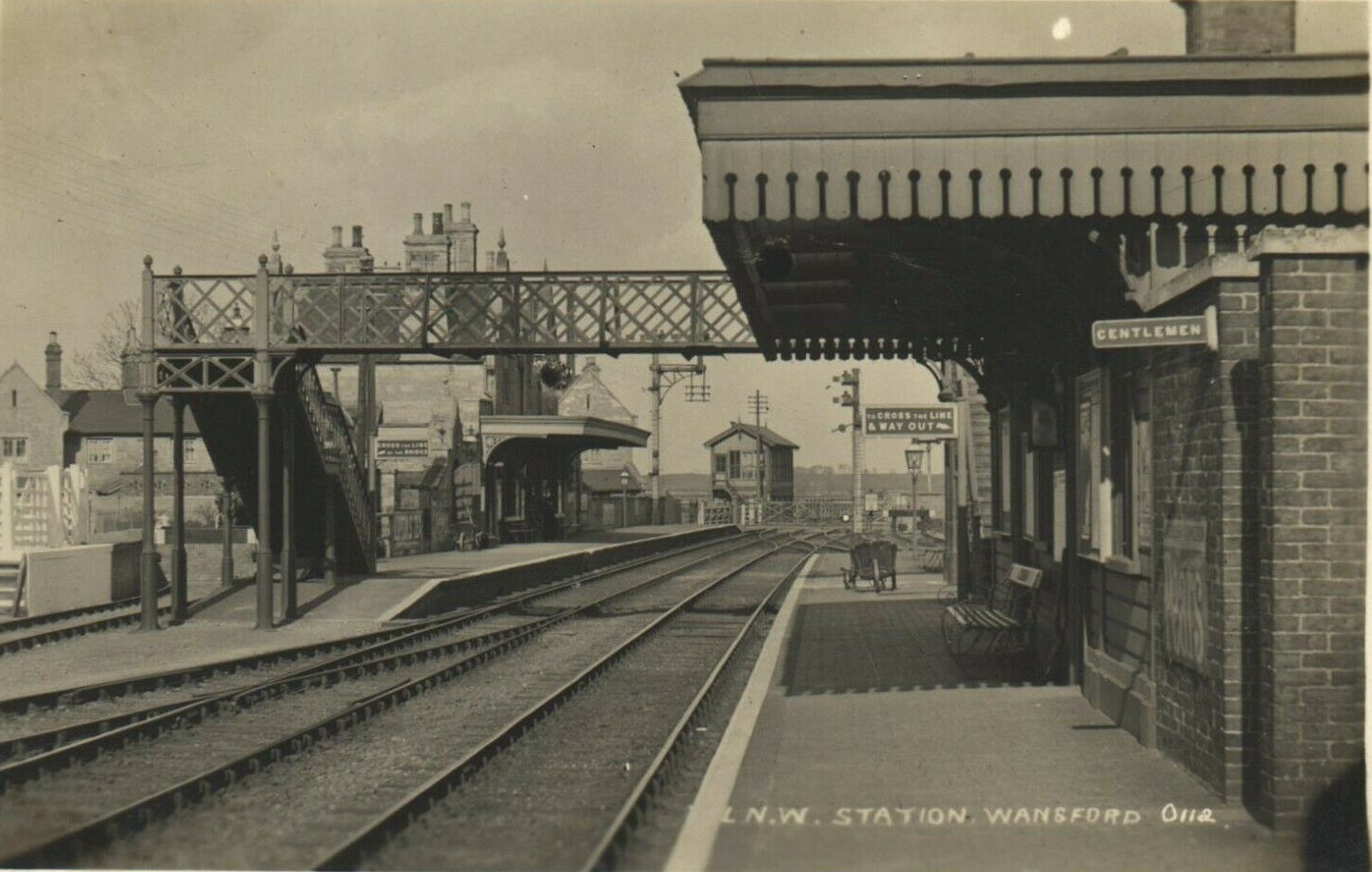
Wansford station

As described above, the line used the Eastern Counties Railway (ECR) station at Peterborough at first, and in fact was the only railway in the area. The ECR completed its line from the east there the following year, 1846, joined by the Midland Railway line from Stamford later the same year.

The Great Northern Railway made its line to and through Peterborough in 1850.

The Stamford and Essendine Railway, an affiliate of the GNR, had a branch to Stamford from the GNR main line, and in 1867 it opened an extension joining the Northampton – Peterborough line at Wansford. It was contemplated that this would be the starting point for a long-distance line, but that idea came to nothing. The connection at Wansford was actually suspended from 1870 to 1879, and the Stamford line used its own station short of the junction. Matters were resolved and the connection was made again from 1879. Nevertheless, that line was never successful and it closed in 1931.

The LNWR itself made a branch line from Wansford to Seaton and beyond to Market Harborough, opening in 1879. This was more successful than the S&ER line, but closed in 1968.

=== Thrapston and Wellingborough area ===
At Thrapston the line was crossed by the Kettering, Thrapston and Huntingdon Railway, which opened in 1866. It was a dependency of the Midland Railway, and was absorbed by that company in 1897. It made no connection with the Northampton and Peterborough line, and had its own separate Thrapston station.

The N&P line had a Higham Ferrers station, although it was inconveniently located and some distance from the town. The people of Higham Ferrers and Rushden pressed for a better station location, and it was the Midland Railway that provided it, the Higham Ferrers branch line, opened in 1893. The LNWR eventually conceded the reality of the location of their own "Higham Ferrers" station and renamed it Irthlingborough in 1910. Even so, the stations were not well sited for Rushden and Higham Ferrers, and their location on a branch line from Wellingborough made them unpopular for passenger journeys. That branch closed to passengers in 1959, and completely in 1969.

The Midland Railway main line referred to crossed over the N&P line to the east of Wellingborough; it opened in 1857, and a spur connection trailed into the N&P line from it, opened in 1859. It was closed in 1966.

=== Northampton connections ===
Approaching Northampton the Midland Railway Bedford branch ran in from the south-east and crossed over the N&P line, running alongside it on the north side to Hardingstone Junction, and then diverging to a Northampton terminus, called St John's Street from 1924. This was a well-sited central station for the town, but it was inconvenient from the railway operational point of view and it was closed by the LMS railway in 1939. The Bedford line closed in 1968, but a Works remained in existence until 1988, and was served by a stub of the branch. When the main part of the N&P line closed, a connection was retained from Northampton Castle station and the Duston curve.

There was a triangular junction at Duston leading northwards to Northampton Castle station, which was built on the Northampton Loop, a north–south connection off the Birmingham main line, giving Northampton a service on that axis. It opened in 1859 and the Duston West Curve was provided then; it closed in 1969; the east curve was opened in 1879 and continued until 1988.

== Daimler railcar ==
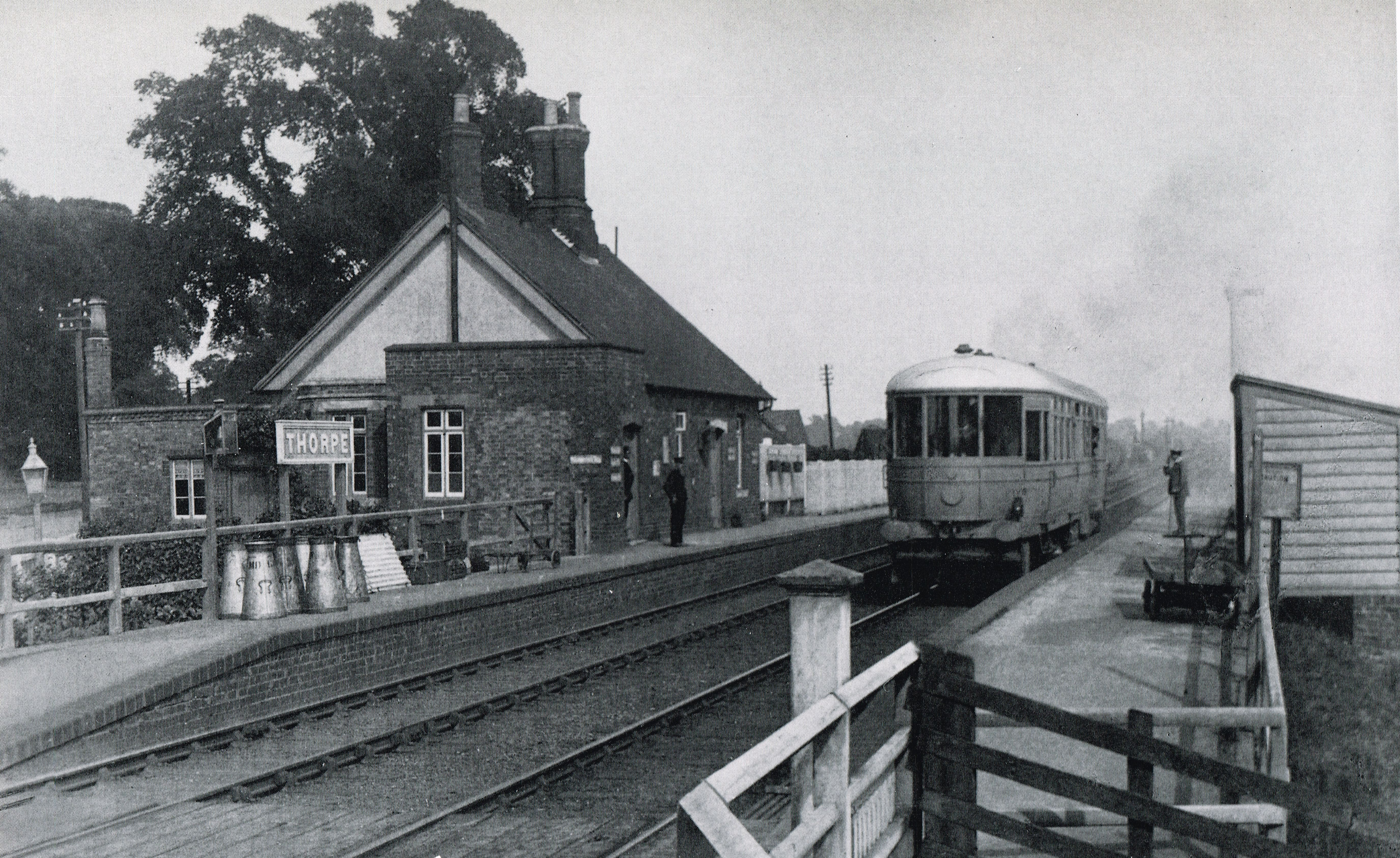
Daimler railcar at Thorpe in 1919

The LNWR experimented with internal combustion engine railcars, and acquired at least one for trials. They were self-contained, and had two 105 hp Daimler petrol engines, driving the inner axle on each bogie through a Cardan shaft. The photograph looks posed, and it is not known whether the vehicle entered commercial service on the line.

== Closure ==
The line was closed on 2 May 1964, except for the stub from Peterborough to Oundle which was retained as a freight-only service, mostly for house coal. Special trains to and from Oundle School, a boarding school, operated until 1972, when the line closed completely.

== Location list ==
- Blisworth; newly located station as junction for Peterborough, probably opened 1845; closed 4 January 1960;
- Northampton; opened 13 May 1845; renamed Northampton Bridge Street 1872; closed 4 May 1964;
- Billing Road; opened 20 December 1845; renamed Billing 1 April 1883; closed 6 October 1952;
- Castle Ashby; opened 2 June 1845; renamed Castle Ashby & Earls Barton May 1869; closed 4 May 1964;
- Wellingborough; opened 2 June 1845; renamed Wellingborough London Road 2 June 1924; closed 4 May 1964;
- Ditchford; opened 2 June 1845; closed to public 1 November 1924, but still used for crossing keeper's family until line closure;
- Higham Ferrers; opened 2 June 1845; renamed Higham Ferrers 1852; renamed Irthlingborough 1 October 1910; closed 4 May 1964;
- Ringstead; opened 2 June 1845; renamed Ringstead & Addington 1 April 1898; closed 4 May 1964;
- Thrapston; opened 2 June 1845; renamed Thrapstone 1866; renamed Thrapstone Bridge Street 1867; renamed Thrapstone 1894; renamed Thrapston Bridge Street 2 June 1924; closed 4 May 1964;
- Thorpe; opened 2 June 1845; closed 4 May 1964;
- Barnwell; opened 2 June 1845; closed 4 May 1964;
- Oundle; opened 2 June 1845; closed 4 May 1964; school specials ran until 1975;
- Elton; opened January 1847; closed 7 December 1953;
- Wansford; opened 2 June 1845; closed 1 July 1957;
- Castor; opened March 1847; closed 1 July 1957;
- Overton; opened 2 June 1845; renamed Orton Waterville 1 August 1913; closed 5 October 1942;
- Peterborough; opened 2 June 1845; Eastern Counties Railway station, used by ECR from 14 January 1847; rename Peterborough East 1 July 1923; closed 6 June 1966.

== Nene Valley Railway ==
A 7.5-mile (12.1 km) long stretch of the Northampton and Peterborough Railway has been reopened as the heritage Nene Valley Railway.
