= Castor railway station =

Former railway station in England

Castor
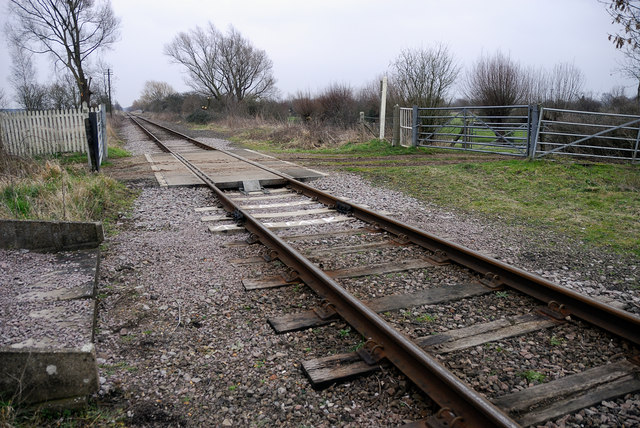
- Former site of Castor railway station

General information
- Location: Castor, City of Peterborough; England
- Coordinates: 52.5665°N 0.36°W
- Grid reference: TL113978
- Platforms: 2

Other information
- Status: Disused

History
- Pre-grouping: London and North Western Railway
- Post-grouping: London Midland and Scottish Railway

Key dates
- 2 June 1845: Opened
- 1 July 1957: Closed for passengers
- 28 December 1964: closed for freight
Location

Castor Railway Station was a station serving the villages Castor and Ailsworth in Cambridgeshire. It was on the old London and North Western Railway Northampton to Peterborough line. On 3 January 1945 the station was badly damaged by a V1 attack. The station closed in 1957 but trains between Rugby and Peterborough East continued to run until the line itself closed in 1966. The line between Wansford and Peterborough has since been reopened as the Nene Valley Railway, although Castor station itself remains closed.

Former Services

Preceding station	Disused railways	Following station
Wansford	London and North Western Railway Northampton to Peterborough East	Orton Waterville
Wansford	London and North Western Railway Rugby to Peterborough East	Orton Waterville
Wansford	Great Northern Railway Leicester Belgrave Road to Peterborough North	Orton Waterville
