= BR Standard Class 5 73050 =

Preserved British Railways Standard Class 5 locomotive

BR Standard Class 5 73050 City of Peterborough
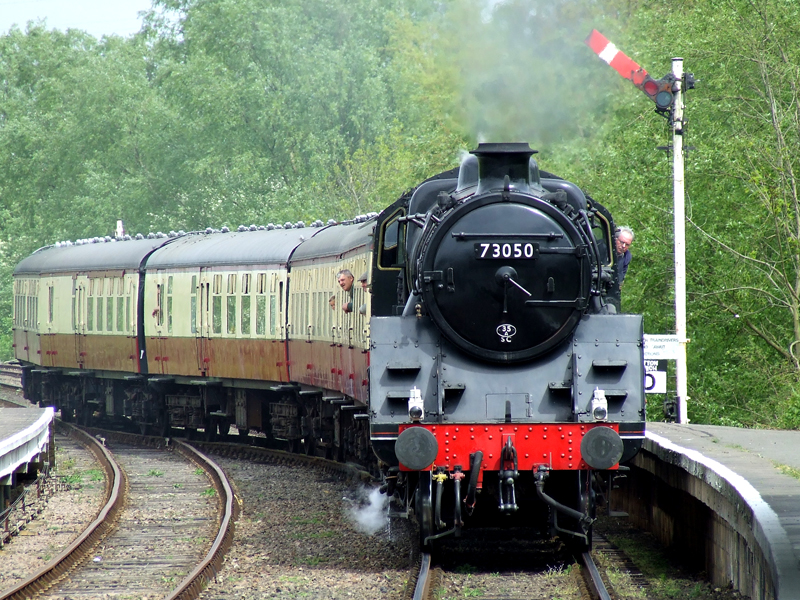
- The preserved 73050, as seen in 2007.
Type and origin
- Power type: Steam
- Builder: Derby Works
- Build date: April 1954
Specifications
- Configuration
  - UIC: 2′C h2
- Gauge: 4 ft 8 1/2 in (1,435 mm)
- Leading dia.: 3 ft 0 in (0.914 m)
- Driver dia.: 6 ft 2 in (1.880 m)
- Length: 62 ft 7 in (19.08 m)
- Width: 8 ft 9 in (2.67 m)
- Height: 13 ft 0 in (3.96 m)
- Axle load: 19.70 long tons (20.02 t; 22.06 short tons)
- Adhesive weight: 58.05 long tons (58.98 t; 65.02 short tons)
- Loco weight: 76.00 long tons (77.22 t; 85.12 short tons)
Career
- Operators: British Railways
- Power class: 5MT
- Numbers: 73050
- Disposition: Undergoing Overhaul at The Nene Valley Railway

British Railways Standard Class 5 No. 73050 is a preserved British steam locomotive. Unnamed in service, it has been named City of Peterborough; it is owned by Peterborough City Council and operated by the Nene Valley Railway on a 99-year lease.

== Locomotive history ==
Locomotive 73050 left Derby Works on 14 April 1954, and was chosen to represent the class at the "International Railway Congress, Willesden, London" between 26 and 29 May. After the exhibition, 73050 moved to its home shed of Bath Green Park to take up duties on the Somerset and Dorset (S&D) line from Bath to Bournemouth. 73050 was one of only three BR Standard Fives (73050 to 73052) to be built with the larger BR1G tender for working over this route. The only other locomotives to use these tenders were the large 9F 2-10-0s.

Locomotive 73050 sometimes piloted the famous "Pines Express". It remained on the S&D line until 1964 when it was moved to Shrewsbury, before spending some time in store, actually being withdrawn from stock for a few weeks. In 1966 another move took 73050 to Agecroft, in Manchester, before finally ending up at Patricroft and eventual withdrawal in June 1968 having run approximately 825,000 miles.

Location	Shedcode	Date
Bath Green Park (S&D)	71G	14 April 1954
Gloucester Barnwood	85C	11 August 1962
Bath Green Park (S&D)	82F	17 November 1962
Llanelli	87F	13 April 1964
Shrewsbury	6D	25 April 1964
Agecroft	9J	30 April 1966
Patricroft	9H	22 October 1966
Withdrawn		29 June 1968

== Preservation ==
Letters in the Nene Valley Railway's archive indicate that 73034, 73053 and 73136 were also considered for preservation, and a 'B1' 4-6-0 surviving as a stationary boiler (61264, later sold to Barry scrapyard and now preserved) was also considered but ruled out due to its poor condition. 73050 was finally selected by the Rev. Richard Paten (1932-2012) to be preserved in Peterborough. Although BR demanded that it be moved by road because a steam ban was in place, it relented and allowed the engine to make a single run from Manchester via the ex L and Y Calder Valley line to Wakefield and on to New England shed (Peterborough) in steam on the night of 20 September 1968 (one full month after the end of steam on BR). It was the formation of Peterborough Locomotive Society to look after 73050 that led directly to the establishment of the Nene Valley Railway some years later. 73050 was kept first in a siding at the old Peterborough East railway station. Richard Paten then borrowed a compressor, and the engine was driven along the siding, on a mere 40 psi of air. A start was made on restoring the locomotive alongside the East Coast Main Line at Baker Perkins until 1971 when it was moved to the British Sugar Corporation factory at Woodston. In 1972, it was steamed for the first time in preservation, being named 'City of Peterborough' by the Mayor of Peterborough on 28 August 1972. Richard Paten then donated the locomotive to the City Council in 1973, who in turn leased it to the NVR for 99 years.

73050 continued to be steamed at various open days at the sugar factory and also steam days at Wansford until 1975, when an overhaul was required. During 1977, the locomotive was moved to the city-based factory of Peter Brotherhood Limited, where a major overhaul was undertaken as an apprenticeship project over the following three years, returning to the NVR on 16 July 1980 now carrying the BR Brunswick Green livery carried by some of her classmates that had been overhauled at Swindon.

On 30 June 1986, 73050 was driven by Prince Edward when he opened the extension from Orton Mere to Peterborough Nene Valley. By 1987, the locomotive required another overhaul, which was started in the early 1990s. This was a very heavy, thorough, and time-consuming overhaul; The entire loco was dismantled. New manganese steel was fitted to the axlebox horns, the paint on the frames was found to peel off easily; all parts were painstakingly stripped back to bare metal and re-painted. Much of the old firebox had begun to develop cracks which required rectifying. Large patches of the outer firebox had to be cut out, along the bottom of each side, and up the corners at the rear. New patches were cut, shaped and welded in. A new smoke box was fitted by the NVR fitters, new boiler cladding and a new cab fabricated from laser-cut parts and hot-riveted together. During the restoration, most of the original copper pipework was stolen and all this had to be painstakingly made again from scratch.

The engine's air brakes, fitted in 1979, were modified so that the engine's brakes work in conjunction with the air brakes when hauling a train. Every valve and component was dismantled and overhauled, with the intention of making the locomotive as reliable as possible for the future. The engine was returned to traffic in July 2005, before aesthetic completion.

The locomotive has appeared in the television adaptations of Agatha Christie's The Mystery of the Blue Train and Murder on the Orient Express, disguised to appear as a continental locomotive, and featured in the music video for Big Country's "Fields of Fire". 73050 was booked for a special on the Nene Valley Railway on 15 August 2012 to mark Richard Paten's 80th birthday, but he died three weeks before. The organisers were determined that the train should still run.

On 21 September 2014, 73050 was taken out of traffic for another major overhaul, which commenced in 2017. Boiler repairs began in 2021.

== See also ==
- Nene Valley Railway
