= Nene Park, Peterborough =

Country park in Peterborough, England

Coordinates: 52°33′55″N 0°19′30″W

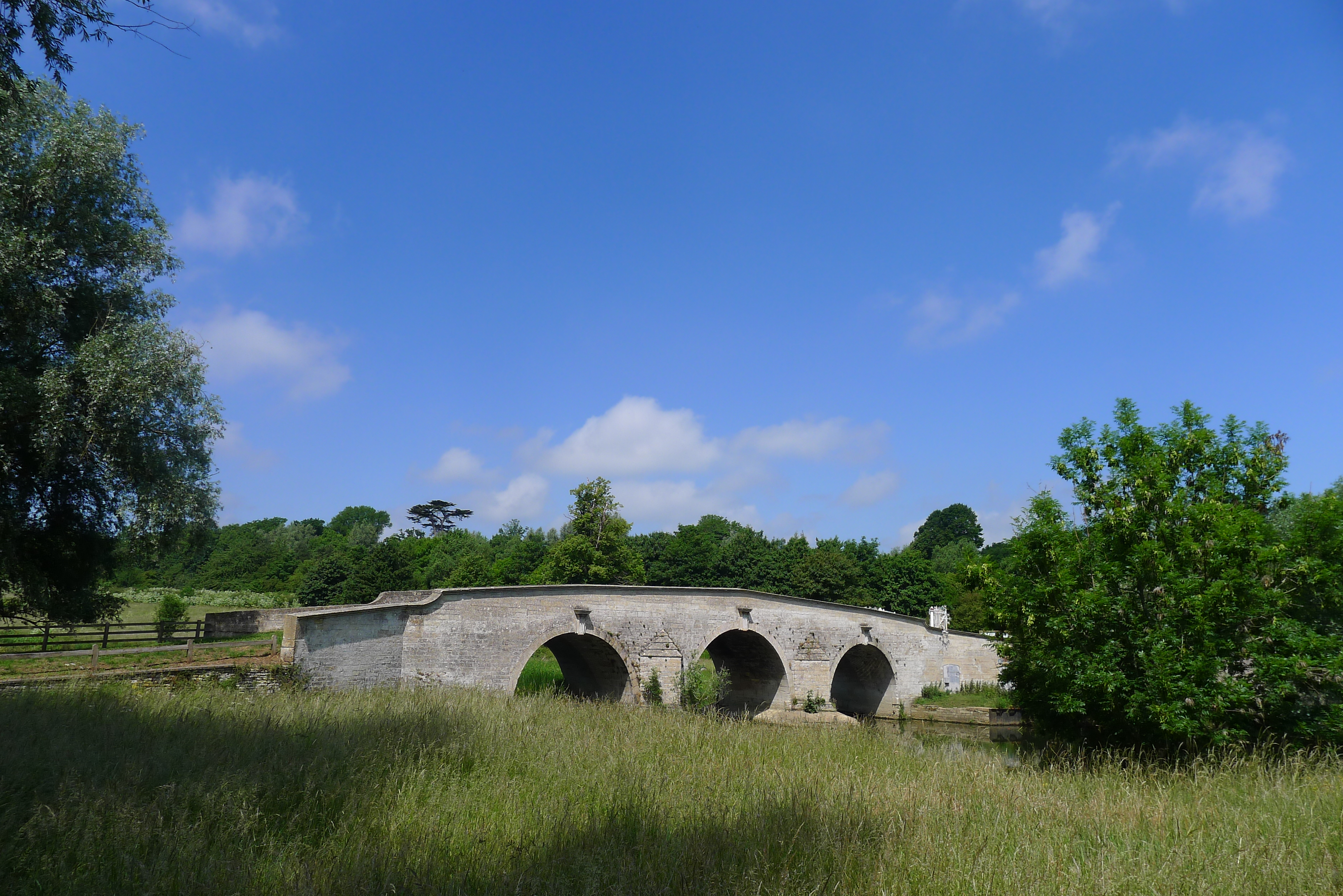
Ferry Bridge at Nene Park

Nene Park is a country park in the city of Peterborough, Cambridgeshire in the United Kingdom. Opened in 1978, it occupies a site approximately three and a half miles long, from slightly west of Castor to the centre of Peterborough.

The park has three lakes, one of which has a watersports centre which provides sailing, kayaking and windsurfing classes. Another lake has a pedalo and rowing boat for hire shop, and the third lake contains moorings for boats and has access to the River Nene. Nene Park also has three children's play areas, located in different points of the park and a small miniature railway. The main entrance to the park is served by the Nene Valley Railway station at Ferry Meadows, from which all the park's main attractions can be accessed. The eastern end of the park is also served by Orton Mere and Peterborough Nene Valley stations.

The park was conceived as part of the town's 1968 expansion masterplan. Originally within the control of the Peterborough Development Corporation, the management of the park was transferred to the Nene Park Trust, a company limited by guarantee with charitable status in 1988 under the auspices of the New Town Community Related Assets transfer arrangements. An endowment of properties provides sufficient income to cover running costs, along with that generated by the Park's tenancies and operations.

The Nene Park Trust is tasked, "to provide for the recreation of the public by the provision of a park for the benefit of the inhabitants of Peterborough and visitors with the object of improving the conditions of life for such persons." The park combines a balance of commercial attractions and informal and formal recreational pursuits appropriate to the quiet enjoyment of the countryside in addition to farmed land and nature areas.

From a total of 2,535 acres (1,026 hectares) within the Trust's management control, 658 acres (266 hectares) are dedicated to Ferry Meadows country park, 259 acres (105 hectares) for two 18-hole golf courses and 82 acres (33 hectares) for organised recreation such as horse riding, rowing, watersports and trout fishing; the remaining 1,535 acres (621 hectares) are in private ownership with managed pathways and informal areas. The landscape of the park is varied, providing a range of natural habitats, informal areas and visitor attractions, including woodland, flood plain meadow and arable fields. In addition local schools make extensive use of the park for educational field study, students also can gain hands on landscape management experience. Within this area there is also a visitor centre, public house, two hotels, sculpture collection, plant nursery and garden centre which add to the broad appeal of the park and its inclusion in the life of the city. There is also a major steam railway run by enthusiasts that is some eight miles (13 km) long.

== Ferry Meadows ==
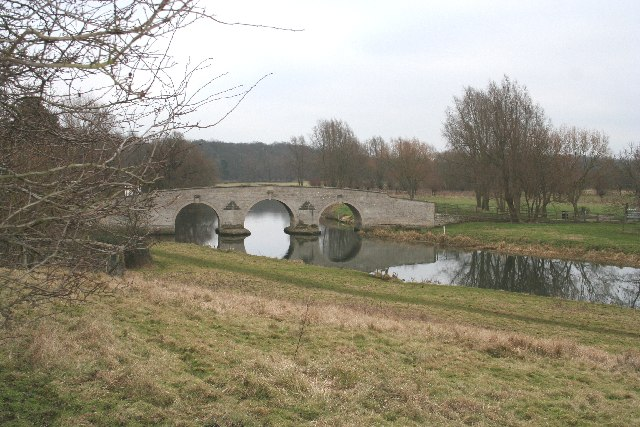
Milton Ferry Bridge (1716), in the parish of Castor.

Ferry Meadows is a country park and recreation area that occupies a large portion of the Nene Park, which stretches for six miles (9.7 km) along the banks of the River Nene. It is managed by the Nene Park Trust.

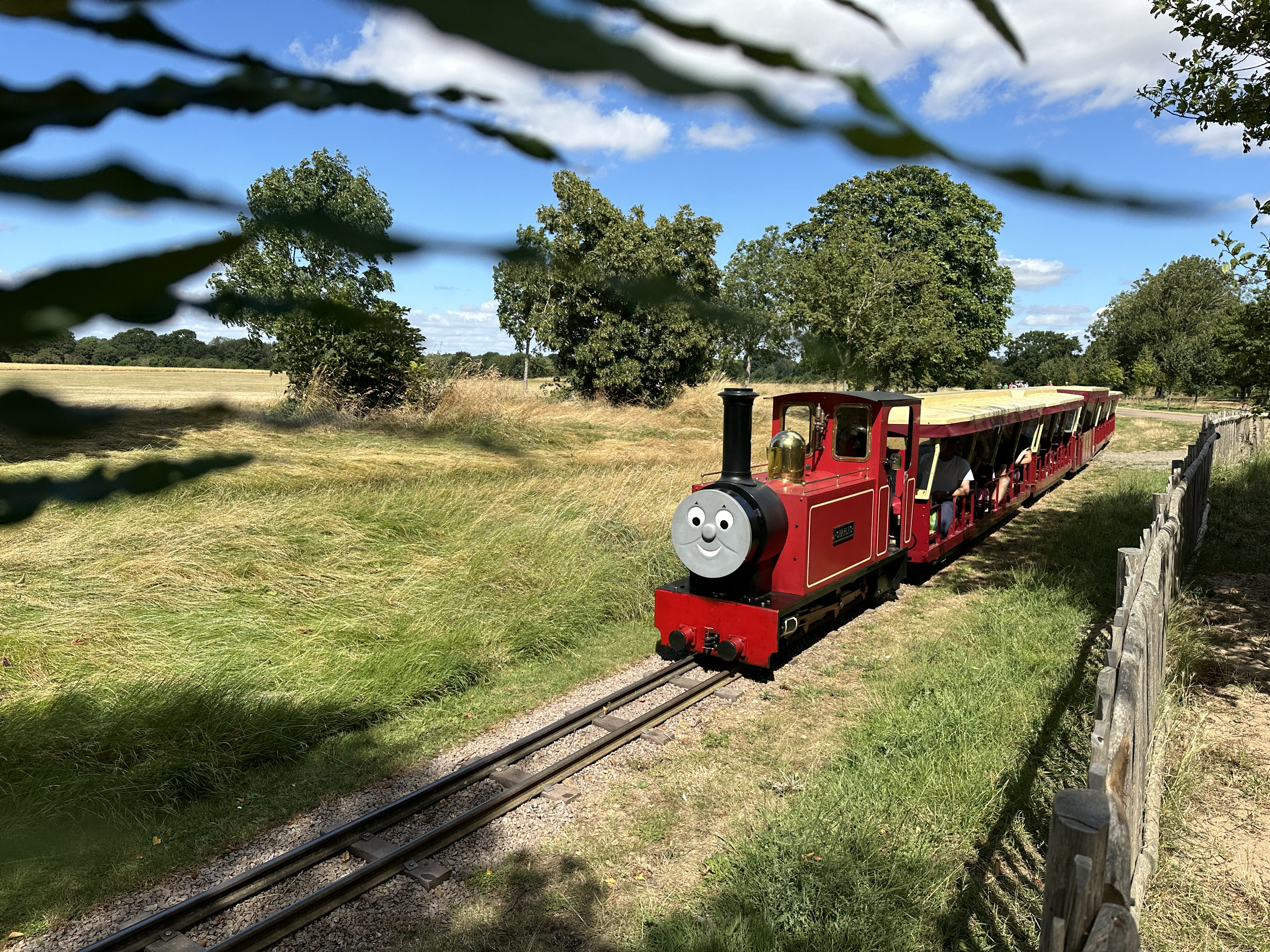
Ferry Meadows Miniature Railway

The area is often used by people for activities such as pleasant walks, picnics and barbecues, coarse fishing, bird watching and at the watersports centre, dinghy and board sailing are available. Additionally it has a miniature railway, occasional pony rides, sculptures and two cafés. One café is called Lakeside Kitchen & Bar, which is located next to the Nene Outdoors Watersports and Activities Centre. It serves traditional home-made food. The other café, called Ferry Meadows Café, is located at the southwesterly tip of Overton Lake. Here, a range of both hot and cold beverages and comestibles are served. Both venues are owned by Nene Park Trust and managed by Raj Regmi. Ferry Meadows also includes a group camping site (tents) and a year-round touring caravan Caravan Club site.

Ferry Meadows is one of the major destinations and attractions signposted on the Green Wheel cycle route.

== Orton Mere ==
Orton Mere is the name of a Mere and its surrounding area.

There are several moorings nearby for boats navigating the River Nene. The area also gives its name to the nearby Orton Mere railway station on the Nene Valley Railway.

== See also ==
- Nene Valley Railway
- Norman Cross Prison, bought by the Nene Park Trust in 2025
