= Ferry Meadows railway station =

Former railway station in England

Overton
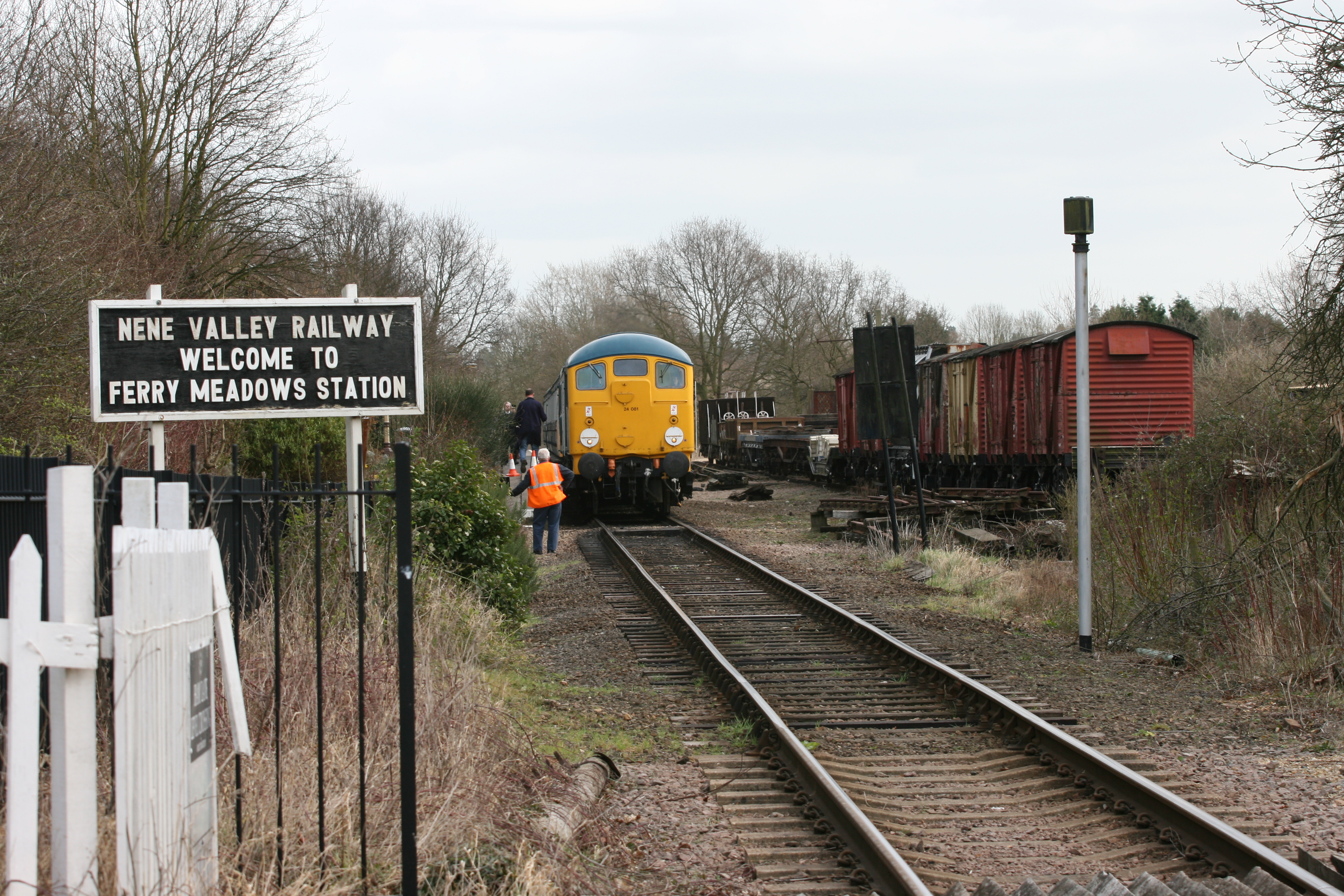
- British Rail Class 24 no. 24081 prepares to depart the station with a westbound service.

General information
- Location: Orton Waterville, City of Peterborough; England
- Coordinates: 52.5589°N 0.3023°W
- Grid reference: TL151970
- System: Station on heritage railway
- Operator: Nene Valley Railway
- Platforms: 1

History
- Original company: London and Birmingham Railway
- Pre-grouping: London and North Western Railway
- Post-grouping: London, Midland and Scottish Railway

Key dates
- 2 June 1845: Opened as Overton
- 1 August 1913: Renamed Orton Waterville
- 5 October 1942: Closed for regular passenger trains
- 28 December 1964: closed for freight
- 1 June 1977: Reopened
- 1 June 2017: Renamed Overton for Ferry Meadows
Location

Overton (for Ferry Meadows) is a station on the Nene Valley Railway between Wansford and Orton Mere. It was originally named Ferry Meadows, the name change being made in 2017. The current station has one platform, and has no car park of its own although proposals have been approved that will create a second platform. In 2004, a new station building was added. Previously at Fletton Junction on the East Coast Main Line, the building was dismantled, moved to Ferry Meadows and rebuilt brick-by-brick in its current location. In the Nene Park close by, there is a watersports centre as well as three children's play areas, three lakes and a miniature railway. The Park is open throughout the year, but most facilities such as the miniature railway and pedaloes only run from Easter to the end of October. Ferry Meadows station is on the site of the former Orton Waterville station.

On 1 June 2017, Ferry Meadows was renamed to its original name of Overton as part of the Nene Valley Railways 40th anniversary celebrations.

Ferry Meadows appears briefly in two James Bond films, GoldenEye and Octopussy.

== History ==
Orton Waterville railway station served the villages of Orton Waterville and Orton Longueville in Cambridgeshire. It was on the London and North Western Railway Northampton to Peterborough line. The station was originally called Overton. The station was closed to regular passenger trains in 1942 but was used by railway staff until the Wansford to Peterborough section closed in 1966 and subsequently the station was demolished. A new station Ferry Meadows was constructed on the same site and was opened with the line in 1977 by the Nene Valley Railway. On 1 June 2017 it was renamed Overton for Ferry Meadows

== Night Mail ==
Ferry Meadows Station will be the site of the Nene Valley's Travelling Post Office (TPO) Museum. 'Night Mail', The International Story of Mail by Rail, will be unique in telling the story of mail across the Continent thanks to the NVR's unique collection of Mail and European rail vehicles. The museum will house both British mail carriages, a number of road vehicles and Continental vehicles. This includes the last surviving coach from the Great Train Robbery.

The Project is being driven by 'The Friends of M30272M' and 'The International Railway Preservation Society'.

== Overton Goods Yard Project ==
The board and management of the Nene Valley Railway have supported a proposal put forward to develop the Overton station site into a centre of non-passenger traffic, which will see a collaboration between the wagon and travelling post office (TPO) groups to create a 1950s/1960s operational goods yard and living/working museum space.

The Overton site has historically been dedicated to the TPO Nightmail Project, which sought to create a dedicated TPO museum over the whole site.

This new proposal will realise some of the Nightmail objectives on a much smaller scale, whilst leaving space for wagon group aims to create a working space in order to demonstrate goods movements from rail to road. The project seeks to tidy and open up the site to provide museum and educational opportunities, whilst providing space for events and working demonstrations.

Preceding station	Heritage railways	Following station
Wansford towards Yarwell Junction	Nene Valley Railway	Orton Mere towards Peterborough Nene Valley
Historical railways
Castor	London and North Western Railway; Rugby to Peterborough East	Peterborough East
Castor	Northampton and Peterborough Railway; Northampton to Peterborough East	Peterborough East
Castor	Great Northern Railway; Leicester Belgrave Road to Peterborough North	Peterborough North
