= Wansford railway station =

Railway station in Wansford, England

Wansford
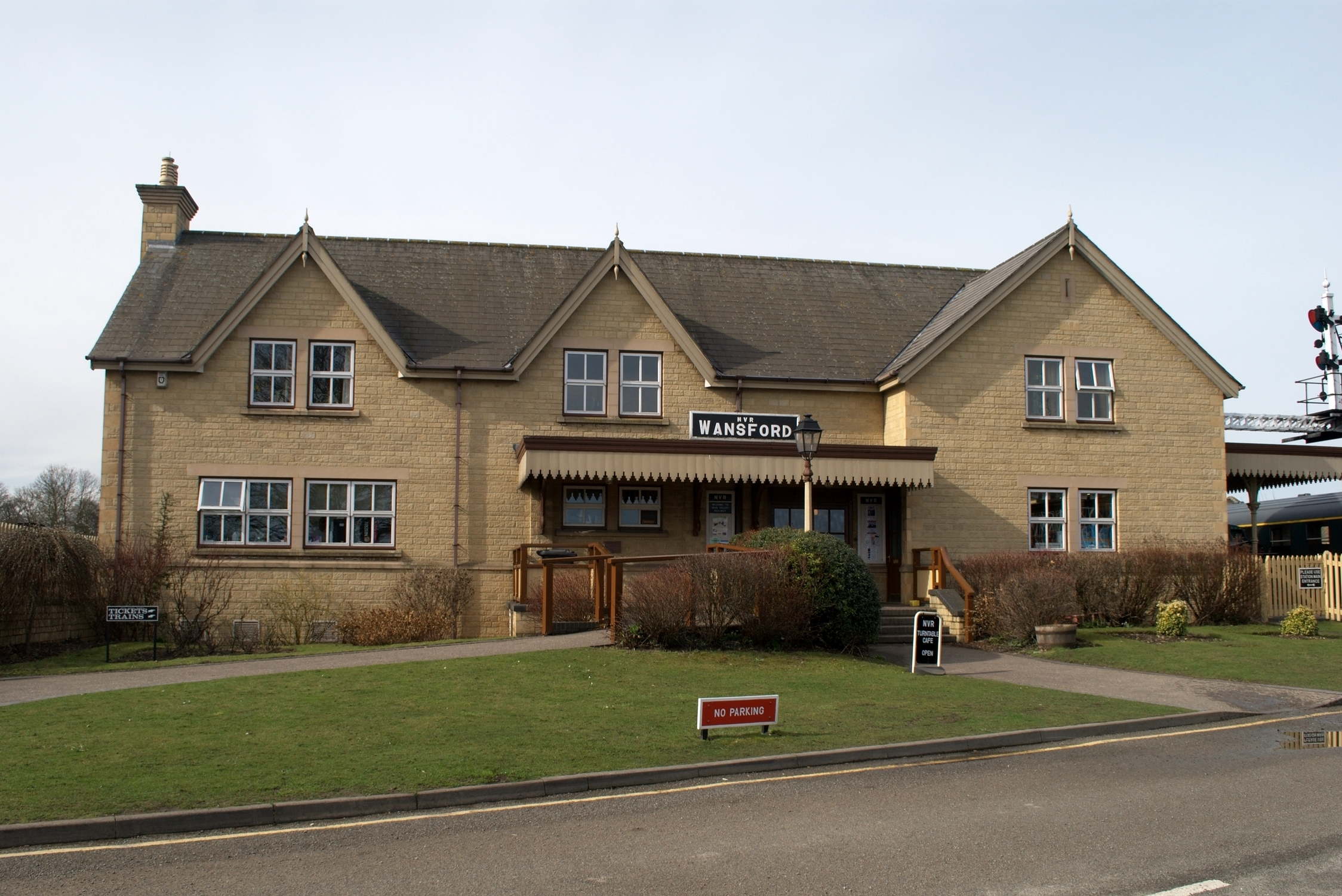
- The new station building at Wansford.

General information
- Location: Wansford, Cambridgeshire; England
- Coordinates: 52.568325°N 0.389540°W
- Grid reference: TL092979
- System: Station on heritage railway
- Platforms: 2

History
- Original company: Northampton and Peterborough Railway
- Pre-grouping: London and North Western Railway
- Post-grouping: London, Midland and Scottish Railway

Key dates
- 2 June 1845: opened
- 1 July 1957: closed for passengers
- 13 July 1964: closed for freight
- 1 June 1977: reopened
Location

Wansford railway station is the headquarters of the Nene Valley Railway in Cambridgeshire, England. The station building was opened in 1995 and contains a ticket office, shop, cafe and toilets. The locomotive sheds are located at this station. Also at the station there is a picnic area and children's playground. The station was formerly the junction for a branch to Stamford, which separated to the north just east of the river bridge at Wansford.

Wansford station and the line immediately either side of it, including the level crossing and the river bridge appeared several times in the James Bond film Octopussy.

== History ==
The station opened with the Northampton and Peterborough Railway from Blisworth to Peterborough in 1845. Being located on the Great North Road, it was for a few years the railhead for Grantham, Lincoln, etc., which at this time were not served by any railway lines. The branch line to Stamford opened in 1867. The route to Rugby became available when the LNWR built a line from Yarwell Junction, west of Wansford tunnel, to their existing 1850 Rugby to Stamford line at Seaton. At the same time, the Great Northern began a service from Peterborough North to Leicester Belgrave Road via Wansford, Seaton and the newly opened Great Northern and London and North Western Joint Railway in east Leicestershire. The Leicester trains were stopped as a war economy in 1916. The Stamford branch closed in 1929, having never properly recovered from the 1926 general strike. The station closed for regular passenger services on 1 July 1957, but passengers from Peterborough continued to use the line to Northampton until 1964 and to Rugby until 1966. The Rugby line remained open for freight as far as the sand and gravel quarries at Nassington. When these stopped, the line closed, but the track remained in situ. On 1 June 1977, the line reopened as the Nene Valley Railway heritage railway.

== Station features ==
=== Barnwell station building ===
The waiting room on platform two is referred to as "The Barnwell Building" due to it having been moved from Barnwell station to Wansford on 5 April 1977. The building is of typical LNWR wooden construction. It was originally built in 1884 for use by members of the royal family when visiting Barnwell Manor, home of the Duke of Gloucester.

=== Old Wansford station building ===
The original Wansford station, designed by John William Livock, is located on platform three and was built in 1844–1845 in Jacobean style for the opening of the railway. This building was finally purchased by the Nene Valley Railway in 2015. In October 2011, it appeared on the list of the ten most threatened Victorian and Edwardian buildings, published by the Victorian Society.

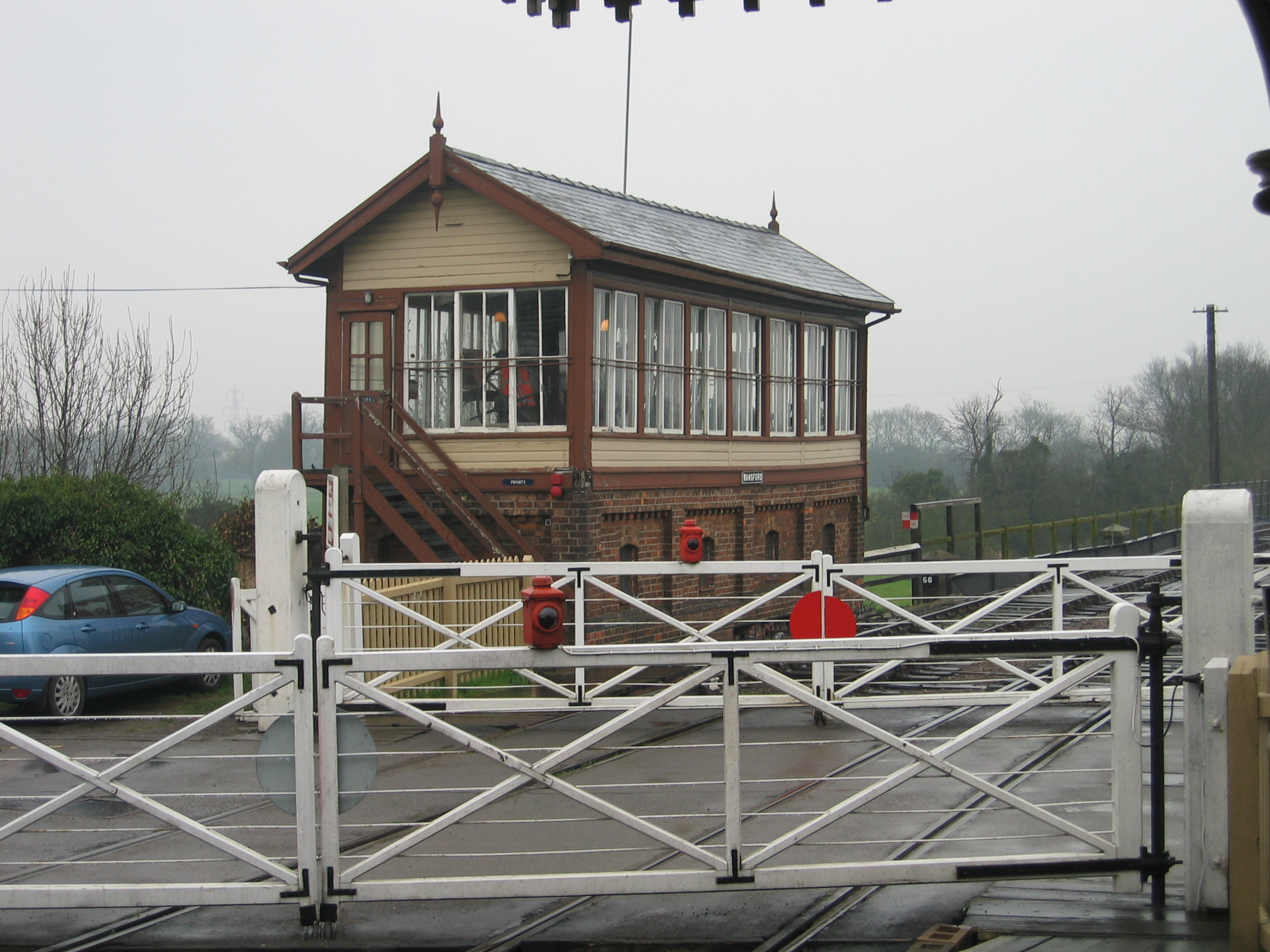
Signal Box at Wansford Station with level crossing in foreground

=== Wansford signal box ===
The signal box was built in 1907 by the London and North Western Railway to replace three smaller boxes. It was originally built with 60 levers and is one of the largest preserved signal boxes in its original location.

=== Turntable ===
The turntable is located behind the new station building, and was built by Ransomes & Rapier of Ipswich in 1933. Originally it was 60 feet (18 m) long and was installed at Bourne in Lincolnshire for use on the Midland and Great Northern Joint Railway. It continued in use there until 1959 when Bourne shed closed and the turntable was moved to Peterborough East; its last duties being to turn Travelling Post Office (TPO) coaches for use on the East Anglian TPO.

In 1977, the turntable moved to Wansford where it was extended by 7 feet (2.1 m) to make it 67 feet (20 m) in length and was commissioned in September 1978. The turntable has been in use ever since to turn the locomotives and carriages at the NVR.

=== Model railway ===
On platform 4, there is a model railway which has been put together by enthusiasts over five years, housed in a converted rail coach. This coach is a BR Mk2e FO ex 'London's Burning' coach, number W3227. The main layout, called Hammerton Junction, is mainly 00 gauge; one end is raised up and has N gauge on it. There is a small layout called Iron Sidings built on top of an ironing board.

== Summary of Services ==
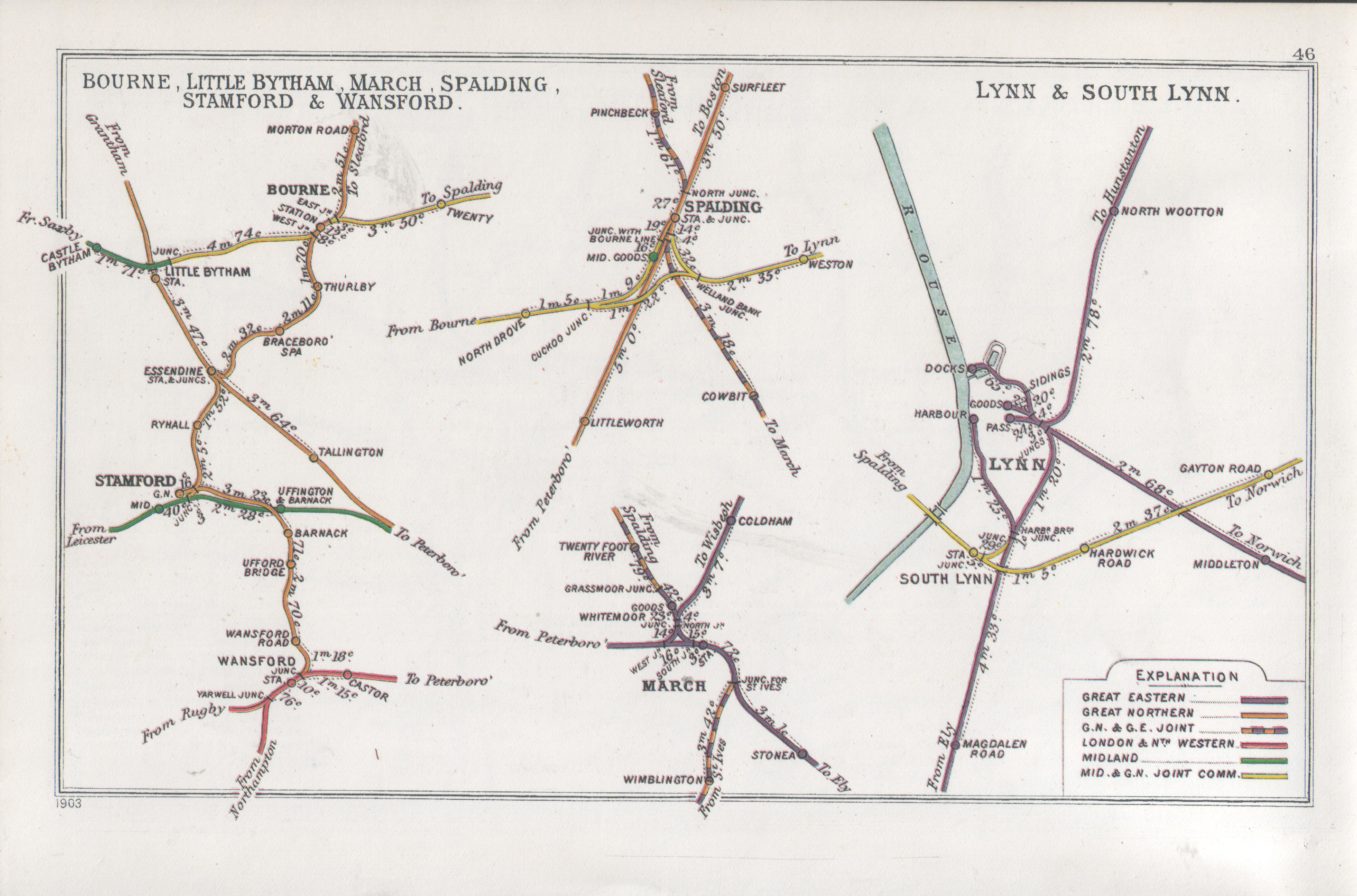
Lines around Wansford in 1903

Preceding station	Heritage railways	Following station
Yarwell Junction Terminus	Nene Valley Railway	Ferry Meadows towards Peterborough Nene Valley
Historical railways
Nassington	London and North Western Railway; Leicester Belgrave Rd to Peterborough	Castor
Elton	London and North Western Railway; Northampton to Peterborough East	Castor
Sibson	Great Northern Railway; Stamford and Essendine Railway	Terminus

=== Sample Train Timetable for April 1910 ===
The table below shows the train departures from Wansford on weekdays in April 1910.

Departure	Going to	Calling at	Arrival	Operator
03.54	Peterborough East	Peterborough East	04.05	LNWR
06.31	Northampton Castle	Elton, Oundle, Barnwell, Thorpe, Thrapston, Ringstead & Addington, Higham Ferrers & Irthlingborough, Ditchford, Wellingborough, Castle Ashby & Earls Barton, Billing, Northampton Bridge Street, Northampton Castle	08.00	LNWR
08.25	Northampton Castle	Elton, Oundle, Barnwell, Thorpe, Thrapston, Ringstead & Addington, Higham Ferrers & Irthlingborough, Ditchford, Wellingborough, Castle Ashby & Earls Barton, Billing, Northampton Bridge Street, Northampton Castle	09.50	LNWR
08.29	Peterborough North	Castor, Overton, Peterborough North	08.48	GNR
08.40	Peterborough East	Castor, Overton, Peterborough East	09.04	LNWR
08.45	Rugby	Nassington, King's Cliffe, Wakerley & Barrowden, Seaton, Rockingham, Ashley & Weston, Market Harborough, Lubenham, Theddingworth, Welford & Lutterworth, Yelverton & Stanford Park, Lilbourne, Clifton Mill, Rugby	10.34	LNWR
08.50	Stamford East	Wansford Road, Ufford Bridge, Barnack, Stamford East	09.15	GNR
09.48	Leicester Belgrave Road	Nassington, King's Cliffe, Wakerley & Barrowden, Seaton, Rockingham, Medbourne, Hallaton, East Norton, Tilton, Loseby, Ingersby, Thurnby & Scraptoft, Humberstone, Leicester Belgrave Road	11.22	GNR
10.19	Peterborough East	Castor, Peterborough East	10.37	LNWR
10.50	Peterborough East	Overton, Peterborough East	11.05	LNWR
10.52	Stamford East	Wansford Road, Ufford Bridge, Barnack, Stamford East	11.15	GNR
11.09	Northampton Castle	Elton, Oundle, Barnwell, Thorpe, Thrapston, Ringstead & Addington, Higham Ferrers & Irthlingborough, Ditchford, Wellingborough, Castle Ashby & Earls Barton, Billing, Northampton Bridge Street, Northampton Castle	12.35	LNWR
11.42	Rugby	Nassington, King's Cliffe, Wakerley & Barrowden, Seaton, Rockingham, Ashley & Weston, Market Harborough, Lubenham, Theddingworth, Welford & Lutterworth, Yelverton & Stanford Park, Lilbourne, Clifton Mill, Rugby	13.30	LNWR
11.47	Peterborough North	Castor, Overton, Peterborough North	12.06	GNR
11.55	Stamford East	Wansford Road, Ufford Bridge, Barnack, Stamford East	12.20	GNR
12.28	Peterborough East	Peterborough East	12.40	LNWR
13.05; Fri only	Stamford East	Wansford Road, Ufford Bridge, Barnack, Stamford East	13.28	GNR
13.52	Peterborough East	Castor, Overton, Peterborough East	14.12	LNWR
14.14	Northampton Castle	Elton, Oundle, Barnwell, Thorpe, Thrapston, Ringstead & Addington, Higham Ferrers & Irthlingborough, Ditchford, Wellingborough, Castle Ashby & Earls Barton, Billing, Northampton Bridge Street, Northampton Castle	15.40	LNWR
14.37	Leicester Belgrave Road	Nassington, King's Cliffe, Wakerley & Barrowden, Seaton, Rockingham, Medbourne, Hallaton, East Norton, Tilton, Loseby, Ingersby, Thurnby & Scraptoft, Humberstone, Leicester Belgrave Road	16.10	GNR
14.37	Stamford East	Wansford Road, Ufford Bridge, Barnack, Stamford East	15.02	GNR
14.49	Peterborough East	Overton, Peterborough East	15.05	LNWR
15.56	Stamford East	Wansford Road, Ufford Bridge, Barnack, Stamford East	16.21	GNR
16.02	Northampton Castle	Elton, Oundle, Barnwell, Thorpe, Thrapston, Ringstead & Addington, Higham Ferrers & Irthlingborough, Ditchford, Wellingborough, Castle Ashby & Earls Barton, Billing, Northampton Bridge Street, Northampton Castle	17.38	LNWR
16.16	Peterborough East	Castor, Overton, Peterborough East	16.33	LNWR
16.37	Rugby	Nassington, King's Cliffe, Wakerley & Barrowden, Seaton, Rockingham, Ashley & Weston, Market Harborough, Lubenham, Theddingworth, Welford & Lutterworth, Yelverton & Stanford Park, Lilbourne, Clifton Mill, Rugby	18.23	LNWR
17.30	Peterborough North	Castor, Peterborough North	17.46	GNR
18.37	Northampton Castle	Elton, Oundle, Barnwell, Thorpe, Thrapston, Ringstead & Addington, Higham Ferrers & Irthlingborough, Ditchford, Wellingborough, Castle Ashby & Earls Barton, Billing, Northampton Bridge Street, Northampton Castle	20.05	LNWR
18.40	Stamford East	Wansford Road, Ufford Bridge, Barnack, Stamford East	19.03	GNR
19.37	Peterborough East	Castor, Overton, Peterborough East	19.58	LNWR
19.42	Leicester Belgrave Road	Nassington, King's Cliffe, Wakerley & Barrowden, Seaton, Rockingham, Medbourne, Hallaton, East Norton, Tilton, Loseby, Ingersby, Thurnby & Scraptoft, Humberstone, Leicester Belgrave Road	21.11	GNR
19.55	Stamford East	Wansford Road, Ufford Bridge, Barnack, Stamford East	20.20	GNR
20.11	Rugby	Seaton, Market Harborough, Welford & Lutterworth, Rugby	21.32	LNWR
22.01	Peterborough East	Peterborough East	22.15	LNWR
22.35	Peterborough East	Peterborough East	22.48	LNWR

== Use in film and television ==
The old station building appeared in the 1983 James Bond film Octopussy, in which Bond (played by Roger Moore) drove a Mercedes-Benz car along the railway tracks after its tyres were punctured in pursuit of a train on which the villainous Kamal Khan (Louis Jourdan) was transporting a bomb. This scene was scripted as being in East Germany.

In 1989, the Nene Valley Railway was used for the filming of Queen's video for the song "Breakthru", which features the band performing on a moving steam train.

A station identified by a sign as Wansford appears in the music video for the 1991 single 'The Air that You Breathe' by UK band, Bomb the Bass.

The Nene Valley Railway, of which Wansford is the headquarters station, was also used for location filming in the 1995 James Bond film GoldenEye, with sequences involving an armoured train filmed on the heritage line.

== Present Day ==
In 1977, the station was reopened as the headquarters for the Nene Valley Railway. The original station buildings are currently not being used, as they are in a state of disrepair. The timber station building from Barnwell was moved here and acts as the station today. The station has two platforms serving the trains that come in from either direction. Trains here run between Yarwell junction and Peterborough Nene Valley.
