= Orton Mere railway station =

Railway Station in Cambridgeshire, England

Coordinates: 52.559741°N 0.280981°W

Orton Mere
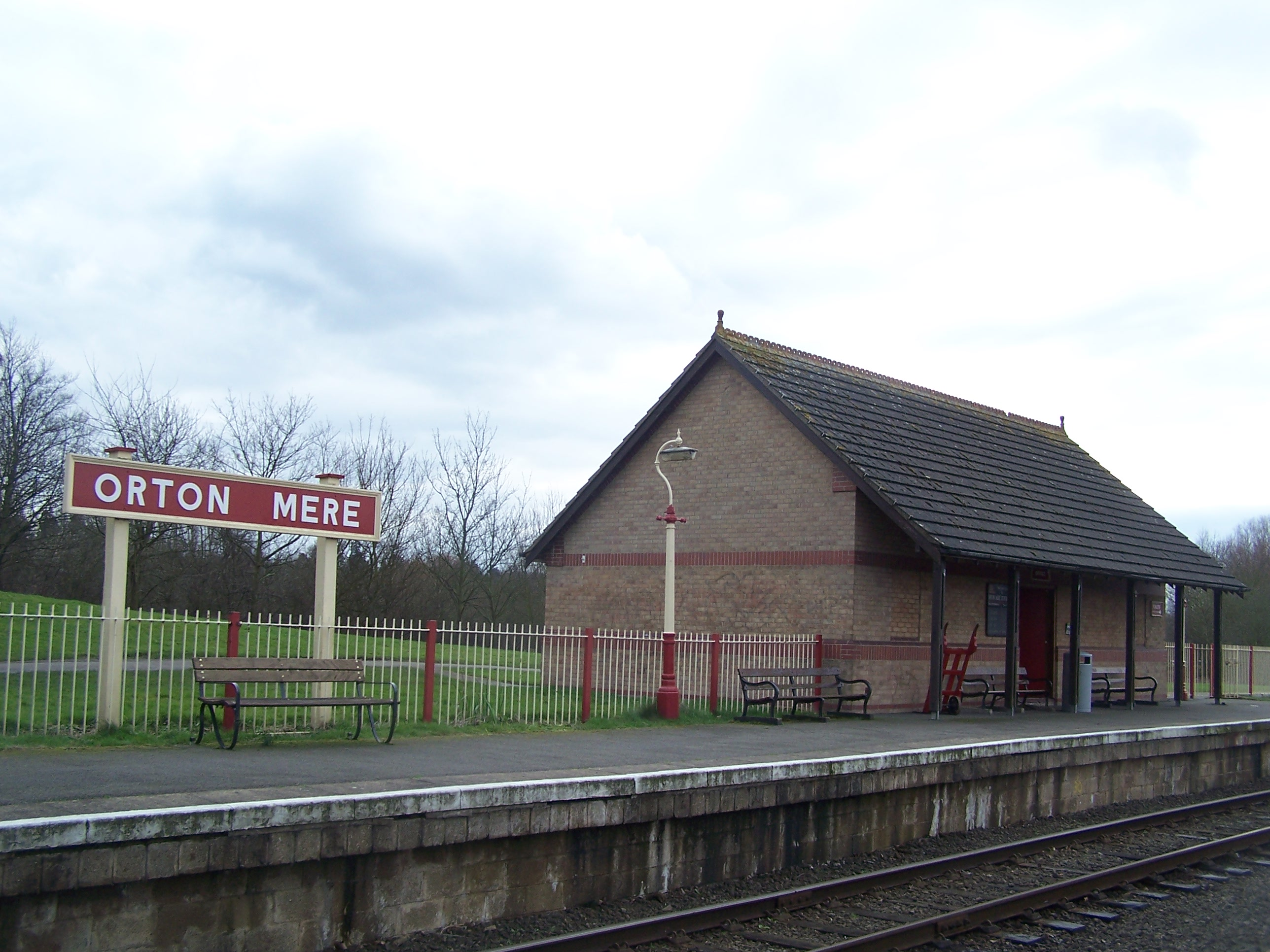

General information
- Location: Orton Waterville, Cambridgeshire; England
- Grid reference: TL166971
- System: Station on heritage railway
- Manager: Nene Valley Railway
- Platforms: 2

Key dates
- 1983: opened
Location

Orton Mere is a station on the Nene Valley Railway and is situated between Ferry Meadows and Peterborough Nene Valley, adjacent to the River Nene.

Orton Mere provides access to the eastern end of the Nene Park. At Orton Mere, the Nene Valley Railway passes under the Orton Parkway, part of the complex road system built when Peterborough was allocated New Town status.

The station has two platforms. The station building is not in use. A signal box was damaged by fire as a result of arson in March 2023, restored, and reopened in March 2024.

Orton Mere station appears in the James Bond film Octopussy and is easily identified by the flyover carrying the Nene Parkway.

Preceding station	Heritage railways	Following station
Ferry Meadows towards Yarwell Junction	Nene Valley Railway	Peterborough Nene Valley Terminus
