= Nene Valley Railway =

Heritage railway in Cambridgeshire, England

Coordinates: 52°33′50″N 00°20′23.25″W

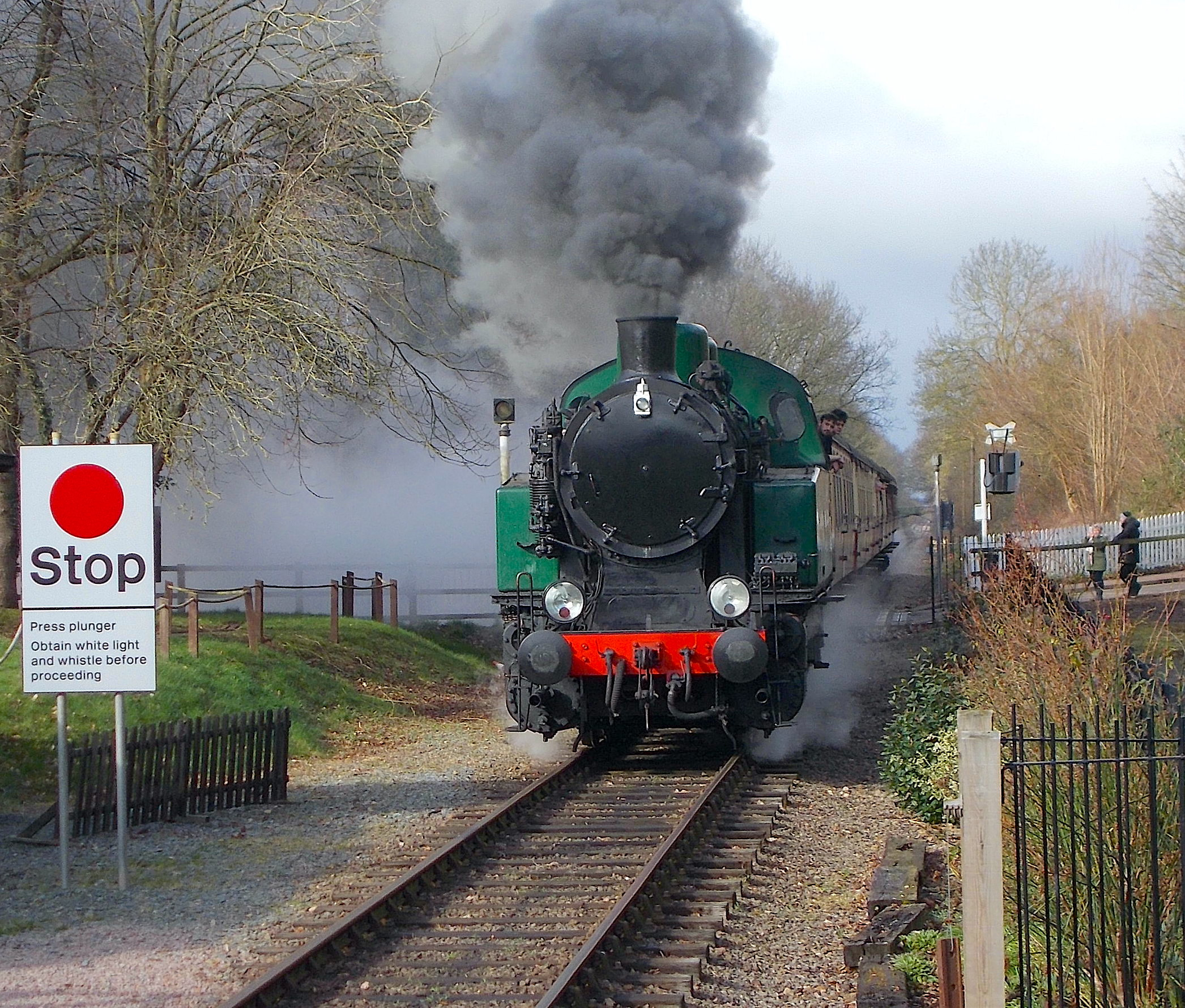
- The Polish 0-8-0T Class Slask No Tkp 5485 arrives at Overton
- Locale: England
- Terminus: Peterborough

Commercial operations
- Name: London and North Western Railway
- Built by: London and Birmingham Railway
- Original gauge: 4 ft 8 1/2 in (1,435 mm) standard gauge

Preserved operations
- Operated by: Nene Valley Railway
- Stations: 5
- Length: 7 1/2 miles (12.1 km)
- Preserved gauge: 4 ft 8 1/2 in (1,435 mm) standard gauge

Commercial history
- Opened: 1847
- Closed to passengers: 1966
- Closed: 1972

Preservation history
- 1974: Line purchased by Peterborough Development Corporation
- 1977: NVR reopened
- 1983: Orton Mere (station building) opened
- 1986: NVR extended Peterborough (Nene Valley) opened
- 1995: Wansford (current station building) opened
- 2007: Yarwell Junction (current terminus) reopened
- 2008: Yarwell Junction Station Building opens officially
- Headquarters: Wansford

The Nene Valley Railway (NVR) is a preserved railway in Cambridgeshire, England, running between Peterborough Nene Valley and Yarwell Junction. The line is 7 1/2 miles (12.1 km) in length. There are stations at each terminus, and three stops en route: Orton Mere, Overton and Wansford.

== History ==
=== Origins ===
In 1845, the London and Birmingham Railway (L&BR) company was given parliamentary assent to construct a line from Blisworth in Northamptonshire to Peterborough. Completed in 1847, it was Peterborough's first railway line. It terminated at Peterborough, later 'Peterborough East' station.

The line was of little significance until the late 19th century, when the London and North Western Railway (L&NWR), which had absorbed the L&BR, constructed a line via Nassington and King's Cliffe to Seaton, below Welland Viaduct. This turned Wansford, previously an unimportant village station, into a major junction. Its importance increased a few years later when the Great Northern Railway constructed another line via Sutton, Southorpe and Barnack to Stamford, on the Midland Railway line. In 1884 the line received a royal visit when the royal family travelled from Peterborough to Barnwell, some 13 miles (21 km) beyond Wansford, to visit Barnwell Manor, home of the then Duke of Gloucester. The station building is now preserved at Wansford station on the NVR, and is known as the Barnwell building.

Between 1900 and the 1960s, the line formed an important connection from Norwich, Cambridge and eastern England to Northampton and the Midlands. The line was generally acknowledged to be a secondary main line and frequently saw large engines such as Black 5s and B1s. However, the NVR was one of the last passenger line closures of the Dr Beeching era, services to Northampton and Rugby having ceased in 1964 and 1966 respectively. It remained open until 1972 for freight traffic only.

=== Society formed ===
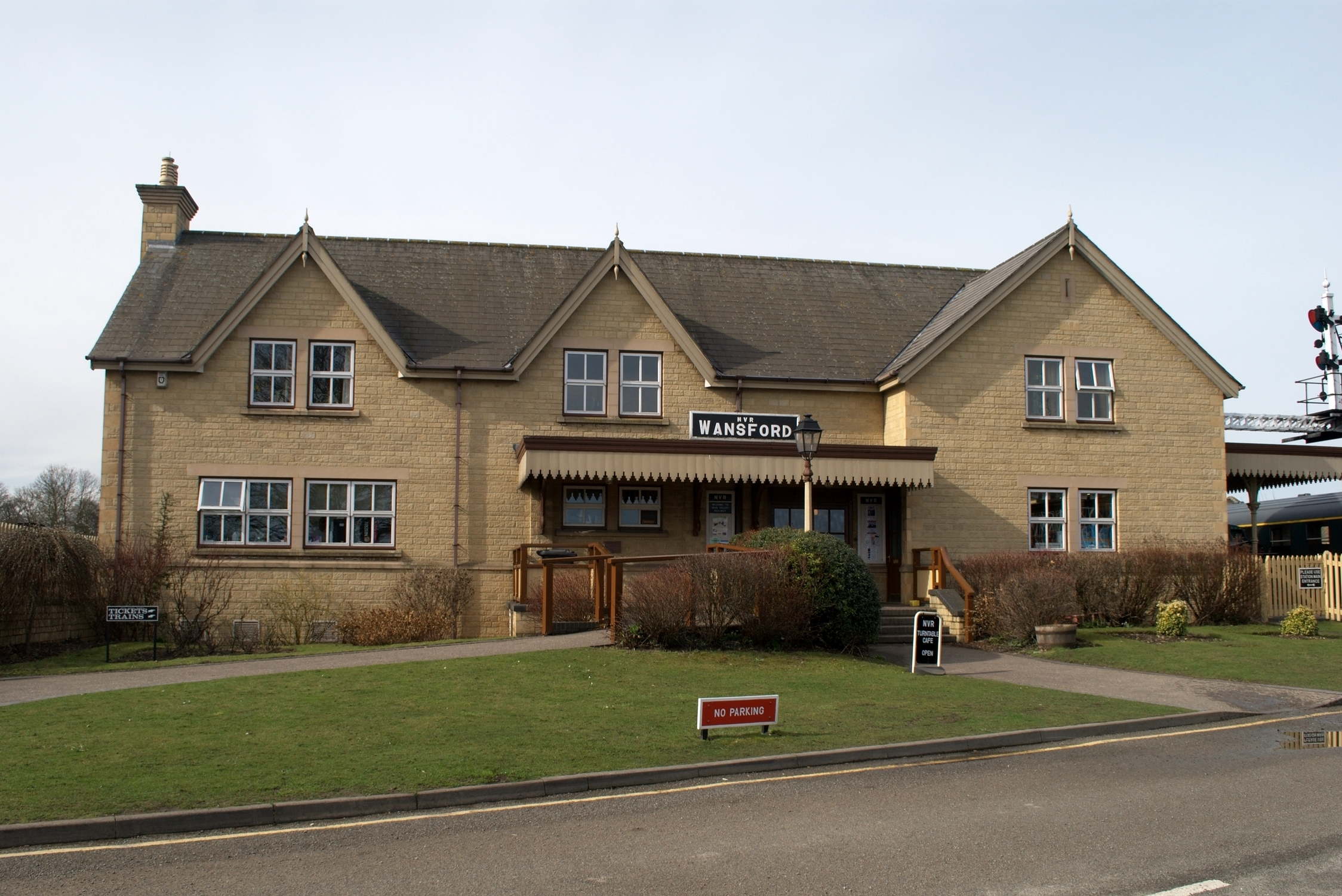
The new Wansford station building

In 1968, the Rev. Richard Paten had bought BR Standard Class 5 4-6-0 locomotive, number 73050, for its scrap value of £3,000. His intention had been to exhibit it outside Peterborough Technology College as a monument to Peterborough's railway history. However, the locomotive was found to be in good working order, and there was much opposition to the idea of the engine being "stuffed", and it was decided to restore it to full working order.

On 28 March 1969, the Peterborough Branch of the East Anglian Locomotive Society was formed, with the intention of purchasing and restoring the BR Pacific locomotive, number BR Standard Class 7 70000 Britannia. By 1970, the branch was strong enough to operate independently as the Peterborough Locomotive Society (PLS). In 1971, 73050 was moved to the British Sugar Corporation's sidings at Fletton, where it was joined by Hunslet 0-6-0 locomotive 'Jack's Green'. Later that year, the PLS held a meeting at which the group's name was changed to 'Peterborough Railway Society' and the idea of the Nene Valley Railway was formally launched.

=== Purchase of line and locomotives ===
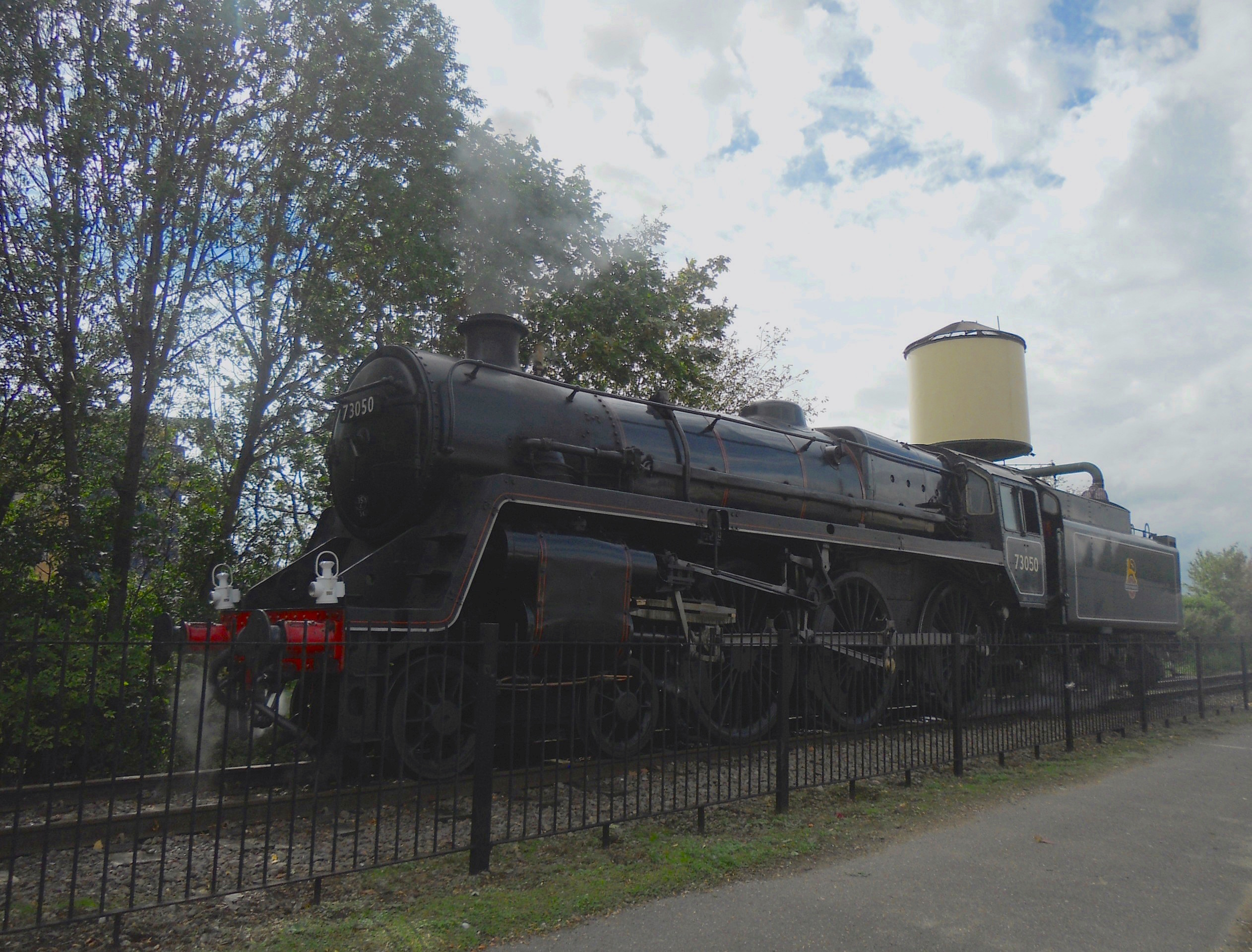
The flagship locomotive British Railways Class Standard Five No. 73050 takes on water at Peterborough Nene Valley

In 1974, the Peterborough Development Corporation (PDC) bought the Nene Valley line between Longville and Yarwell Junctions and it began leasing it to the PRS to operate the railway – a major milestone in the society's history.

When the PRS acquired the line, the intention was to work the line with British locomotives and stock. However, enthusiasts from other railways and preservation societies had already acquired almost all of the serviceable ex-BR locomotives – all that was left was a collection of rusting hulks. Apart from 73050, the society's locomotives were mostly small, industrial shunting engines and therefore not suitable for the 7.5-mile (12.1 km) round trip. Ex-BR rolling stock was also in very short supply following the disposal of most pre-nationalisation (pre-1948) stock. The PDC, having paid out a considerable sum of money for the line, was anxious that trains should start running as soon as possible – certainly before the opening of the new Nene Park in 1978. However, with the PRC's lack of stock and locomotives this looked highly improbable.

In 1973, PRS member Richard Hurlock had approached the society for a home for his ex-Swedish State Railways (SJ) class S1 2-6-4T oil-fired locomotive, number 1928. Because the engine was higher and wider than British stock, it was to be a static exhibition only. During 1974, it was realised that the use of foreign stock and engines could answer the NVR's aspirations. After a feasibility study was carried out, it was discovered that only one bridge would have to be demolished to allow the running to continental loading gauge. Some reductions would also have to be made to the width of the platforms. In 1973, BR gave PRS permission to use Wansford signal box and, in September of that year, the first items of stock arrived at the PRS depot.

=== Operation ===
Before the stock could be moved from the BSC depot to Wansford, the missing 400 yards (366 m) of the Fletton Loop had to be rebuilt, allowing access to the Nene Valley line. The track was completed in March 1974 and the stock moved to Wansford in time for the Easter weekend, when the new 'Wansford Steam Centre' opened for the first time. Between 1974 and 1977, the line was upgraded to passenger-carrying standard and the first passenger train ran on 1 June 1977, hauled by the 'Nord 3.628' – a French 4-6-0 locomotive and 'SJ 1178' – another Swedish tank engine, pulling a set of ex-BR electrical multiple unit coaches owned by the Southern Electric Group.

=== Extension to Peterborough ===
In the early 1980s, the NVR decided to extend its running line, which then terminated at Orton Mere station, along the route of the original Nene Valley Line to a new station west of the East Coast Main Line, adjacent to the new Railworld Museum. Peterborough Nene Valley opened, for the first time, on the Late Spring Bank Holiday weekend of 26 May 1986. This extended the NVR to its current length, 7 1/2 miles (12.1 km).

=== Future ===
In 2024, the Nene Valley Railway and Railworld Nature Reserve acquired the former Wansford Road Station. Built in 1869, it served the branch line to Stamford, Lincolnshire until it closed in 1929. In 2022, the station and platform were facing demolition by National Highways for the new dual carriageway between Wansford and Sutton. By mid 2025 it had been dismantled stone by stone and reconstructed at the eastern end of the railway.

== Stations ==
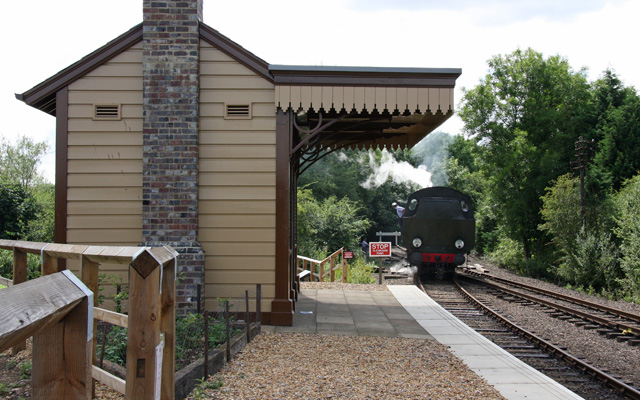
The brand new station building at Yarwell

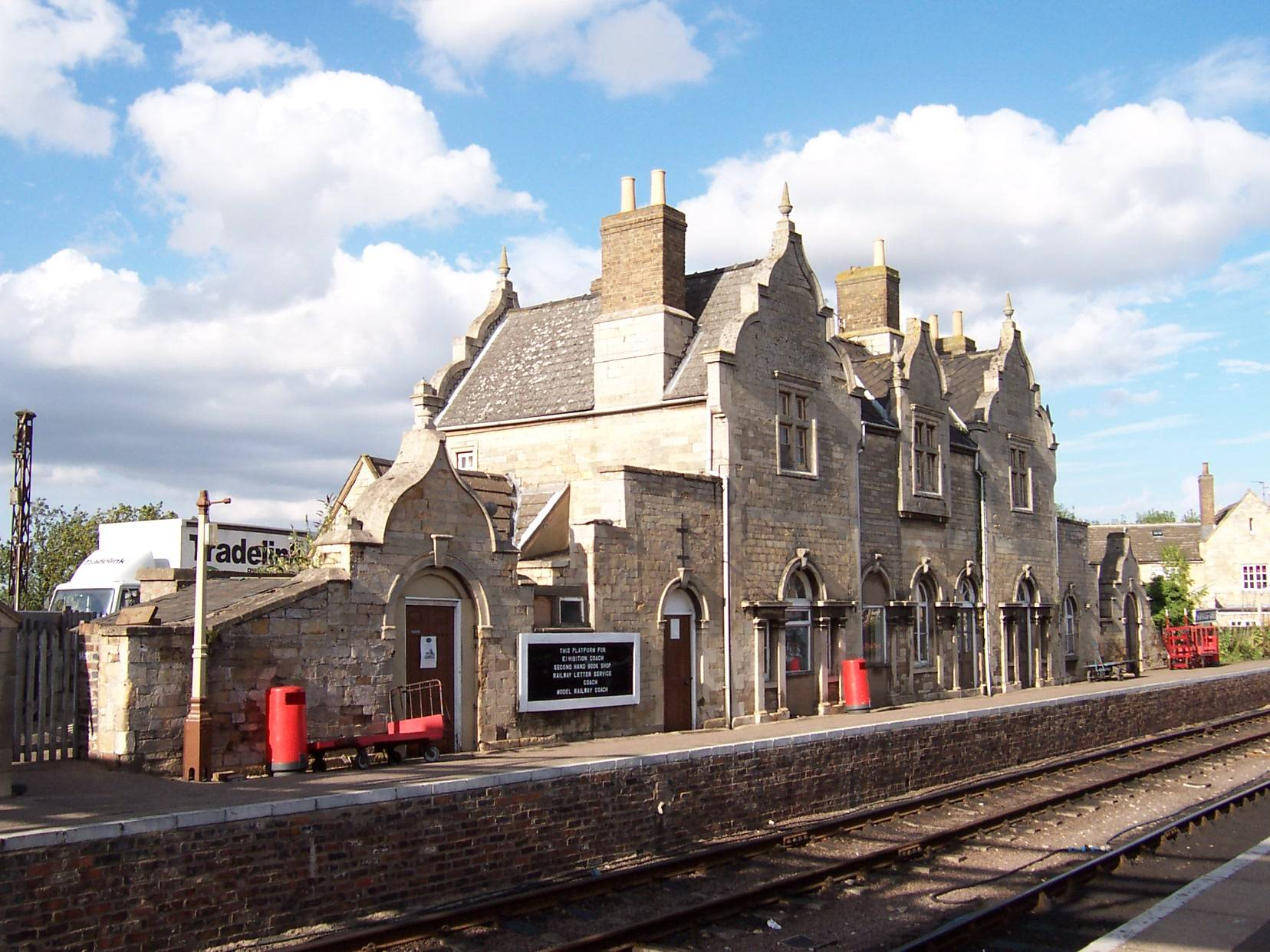
The original Wansford station building, which is not in use, on Platform 3

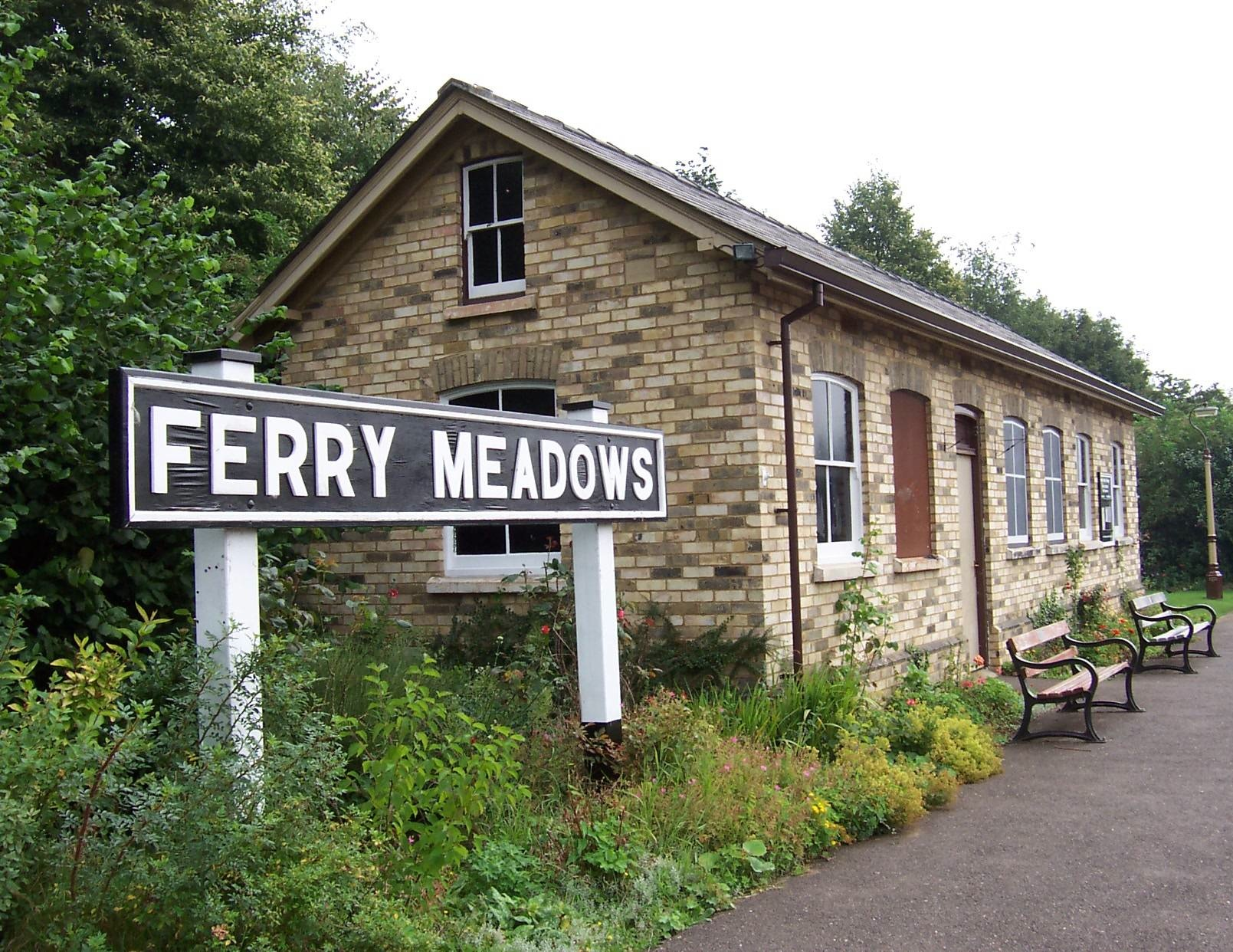
The new station building at Ferry Meadows, which used to be a goods office

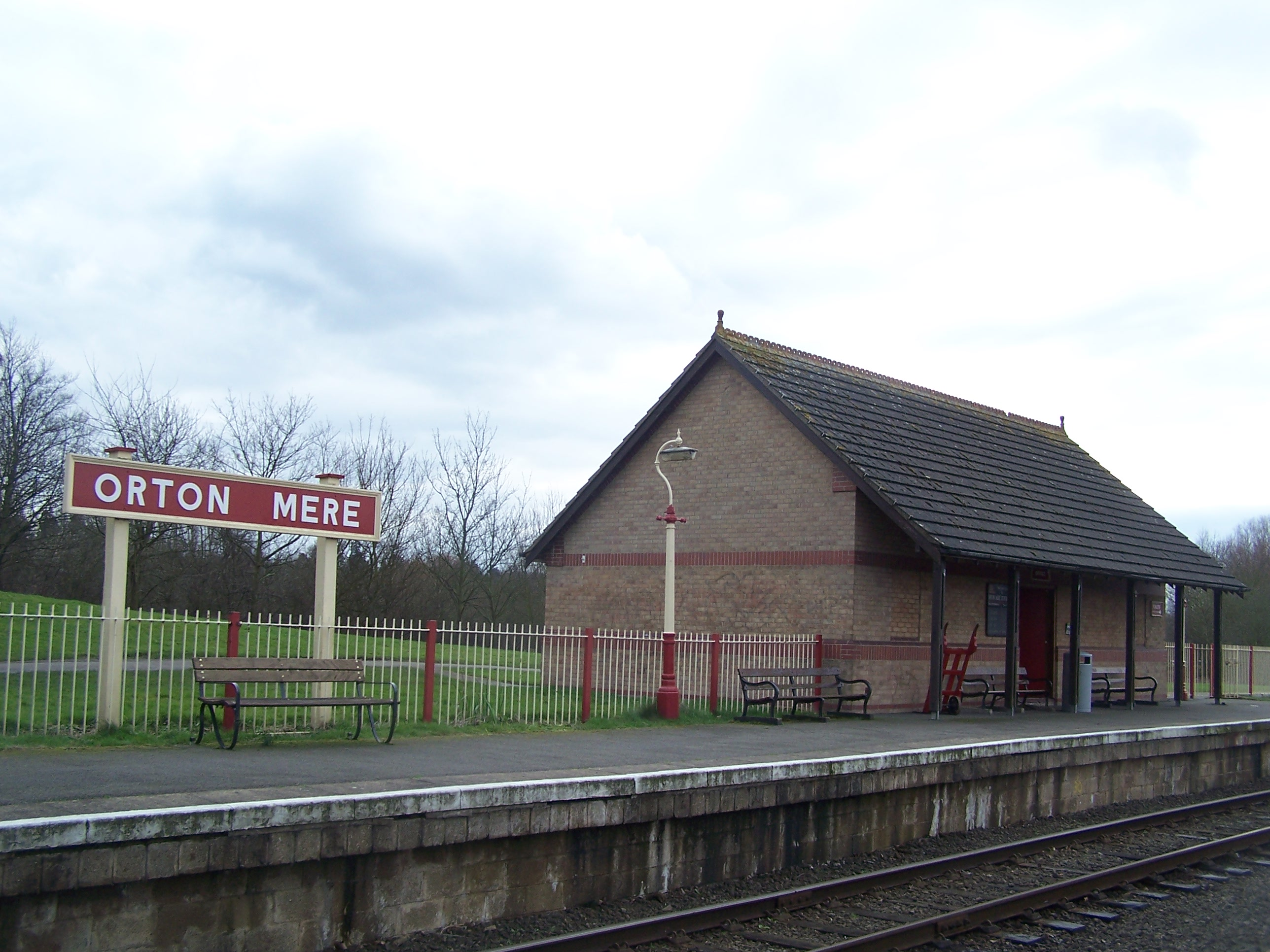
Orton Mere station building, which opened in 1983

=== Yarwell Junction ===
Yarwell Junction is the former junction between the lines to Northampton and Market Harborough. It is the current terminus of the NVR's operating line. In April 2006 the track was realigned, allowing a platform to be built at Yarwell Junction, which opened at Easter 2007 (there was never previously a station on the site). The new station is linked by footpaths to Nassington and the mill village of Yarwell, but there is no vehicular access. Yarwell Junction is about 1 mile (1.6 km) west of Wansford station, at the other end of Yarwell Tunnel.

=== Wansford ===
Wansford is the headquarters of the railway and most of the facilities are based here. The current station building was opened in 1995 and contains a ticket office, shop, cafe and toilets. The locomotive sheds are located at this station. Also at the station there is a miniature railway, picnic area and children's playground. The station was formerly the junction for a branch to Stamford, which diverged to the north just east of the river bridge at Wansford. The original Wansford station is located on platform three and was built in 1844–1845 in Jacobean style for the opening of the railway. This building was purchased by the railway in 2015.

=== Castor ===
Castor is a disused station between Wansford and Ferry Meadows. It closed in the 1960s and despite the NVR (which runs through it) reopening, the station remains closed.

=== Overton (for Ferry Meadows) ===
Overton (for Ferry Meadows) is located near the site of Orton Waterville station and provides access to the nearby country park. The current building was moved brick by brick from the old goods yard at Fletton Junction on the East Coast Main Line; it replaced a portable building desperately in need of repair. NVR has now added a canopy. The station building was offered to the NVR for £1 plus transportation costs. The Park is open throughout the year, but most facilities such as the miniature railway and pedaloes only run from Easter to the end of October. The station is also the site of the new Night Mail Museum, with construction well under way with some exhibits open to view. Overton station was renamed Overton 'for Ferry Meadows' in 2017 in conjunction with the Nene Valley Railway's 40th anniversary celebrations.

=== Orton Mere ===
Orton Mere is a two platform station with a station building built in 1983 and a signal box. Until 1986 this was the terminus of the line. Most trains depart from platform 1. Just outside the station towards Peterborough is the Fletton Loop which links the NVR to the mainline. The signal box controls the passing loop. It was badly damaged in 2023 by an arson attack. Following fund raising by two local youngsters the box has been fully rebuilt and recommissioned.

This station provides access to the eastern end of the Nene Park.

=== Longville Junction ===
Longville (or Longueville) Junction is about 1 mile (1.6 km) from Peterborough (Nene Valley) and links to the nearby East Coast Main Line. As of March 2013, there is no platform here, as Orton Mere station is only a few hundred yards close by.

=== Peterborough (Nene Valley) ===
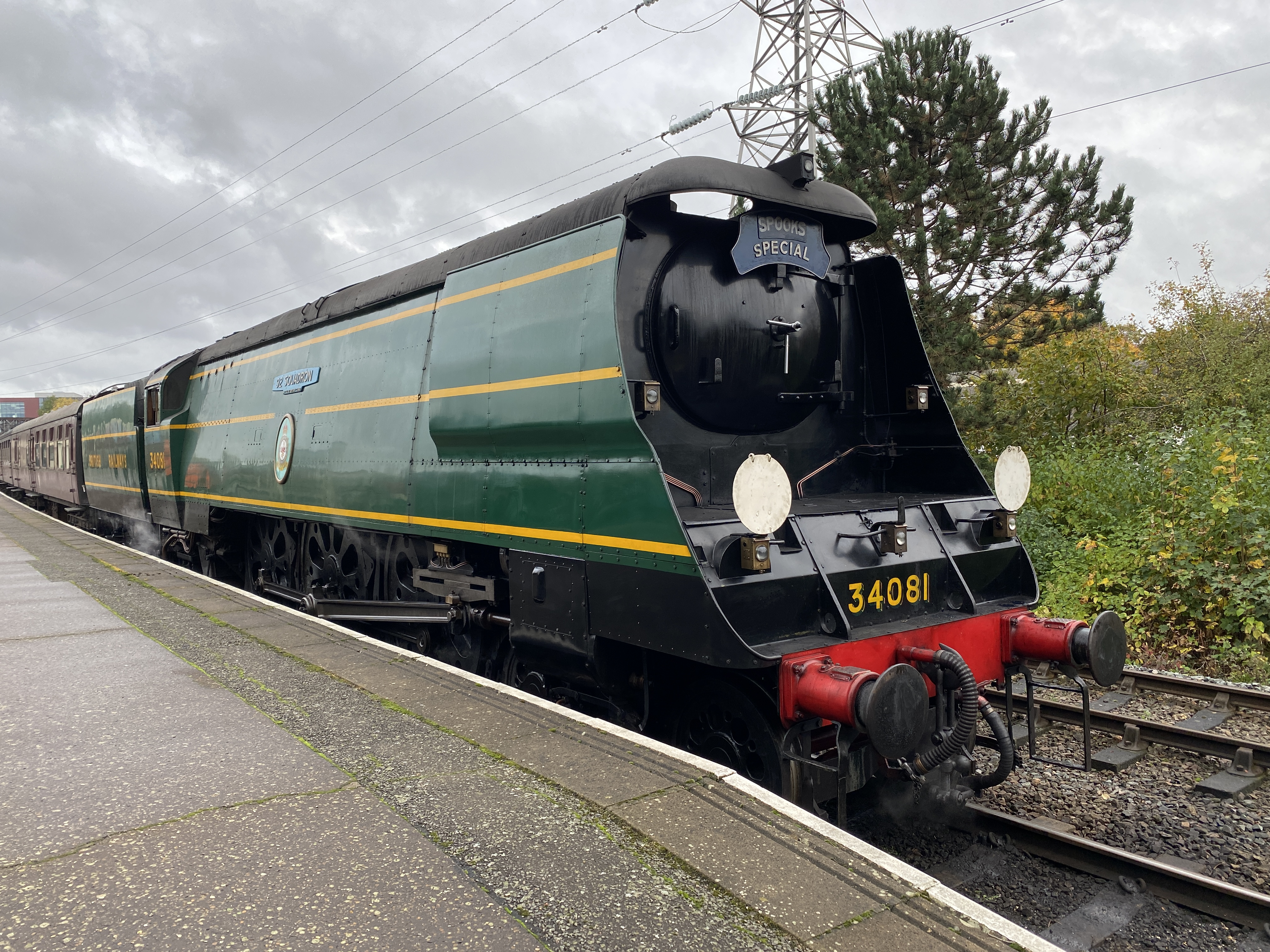
34081 92 Squadron at Peterborough in October 2022.

Peterborough Nene Valley (a.k.a. Peterborough West), is the current end of the line. Here there is a platform, a bay platform and a station building housing a ticket office, a small souvenir shop and toilets. It is a 10-minute walk from here to Peterborough City Centre. Railworld is next door to the station with a wide variety of rolling stock on display. The station building formerly at Wansford Road Station (on the old line from Wansford to Stamford) has been relocated here although, as at October 2025, interior fitting out of the building is still pending.

== Locomotives ==
The Nene Valley Railway has a full-scale "replica" of Thomas the Tank Engine working a passenger and freight service on 'Thomas' events; it was the first railway in the world to possess one. The Nene Valley Railway considers its Thomas to be the "official" Thomas the Tank Engine, because it was named by Thomas' creator, the Rev. W. Awdry, in 1971. The replica engine runs at certain special events, weekends and bank holidays; however, the Nene Valley Railway does not host official 'Day out with Thomas' events as many railways do.

=== Operational steam locomotives ===
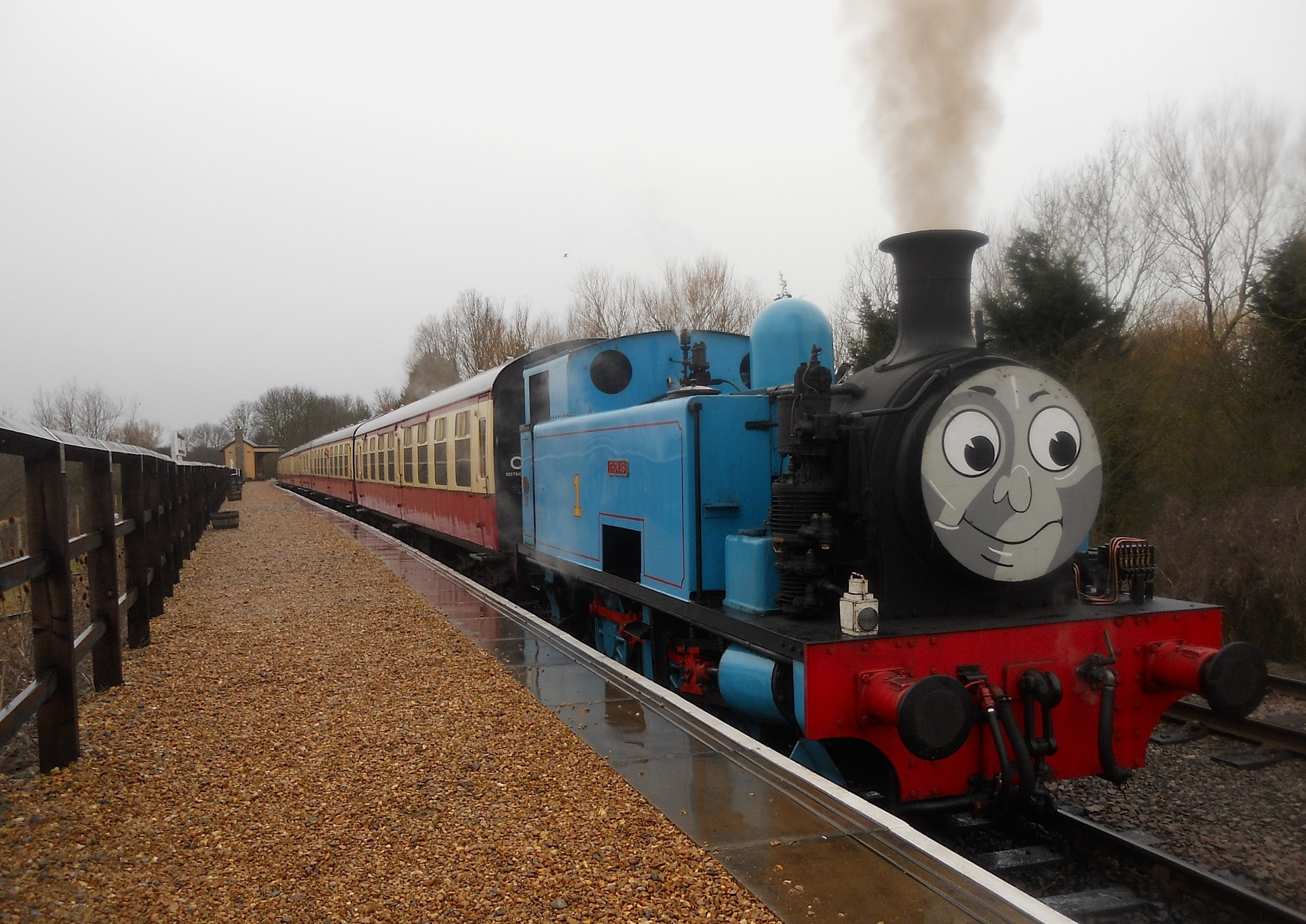
Thomas No. 1 and his branch line train are seen at Yarwell.

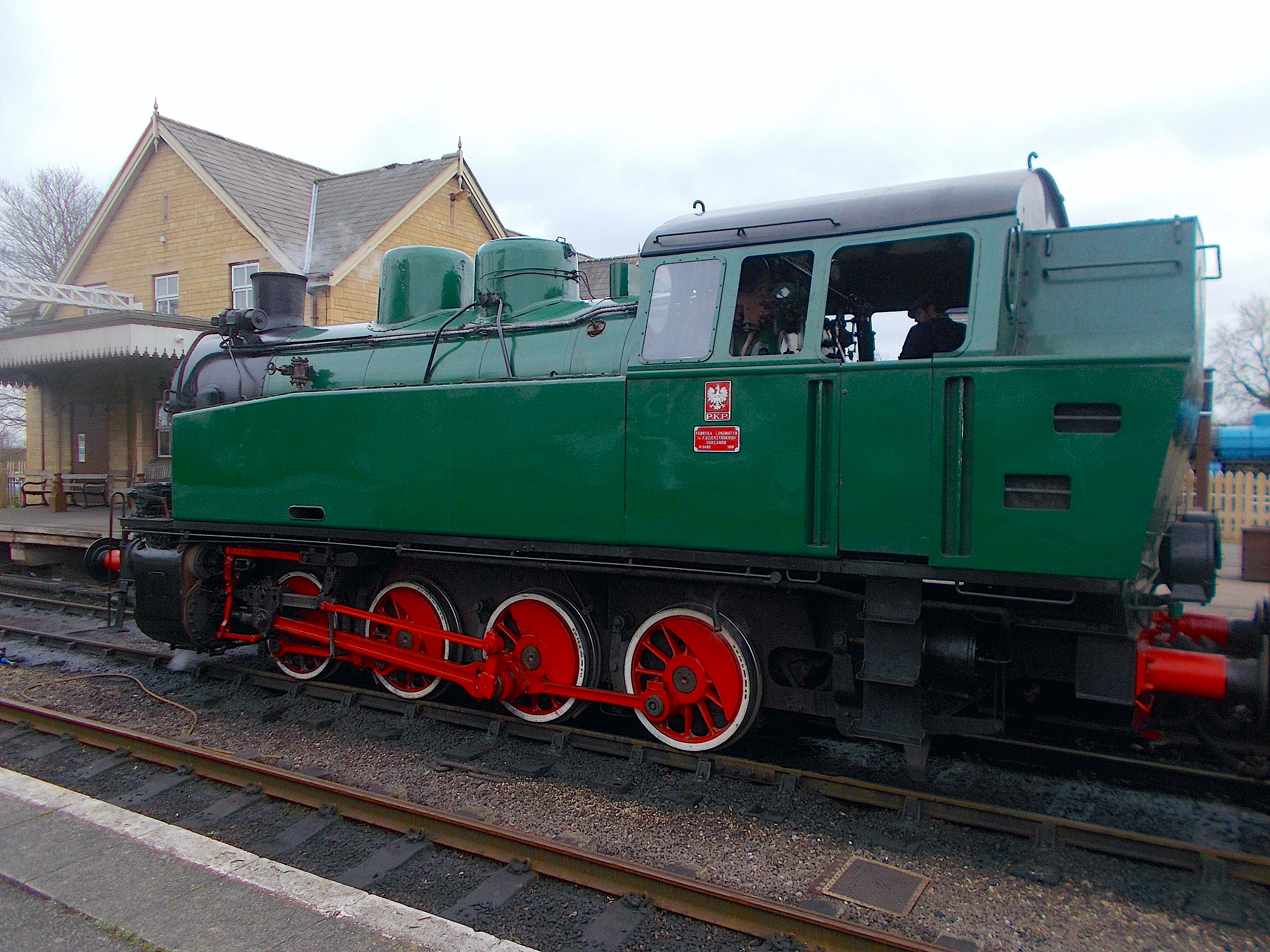
A side view of Polish 0-8-0T Class Slask No. Tkp 5485 at Wansford.

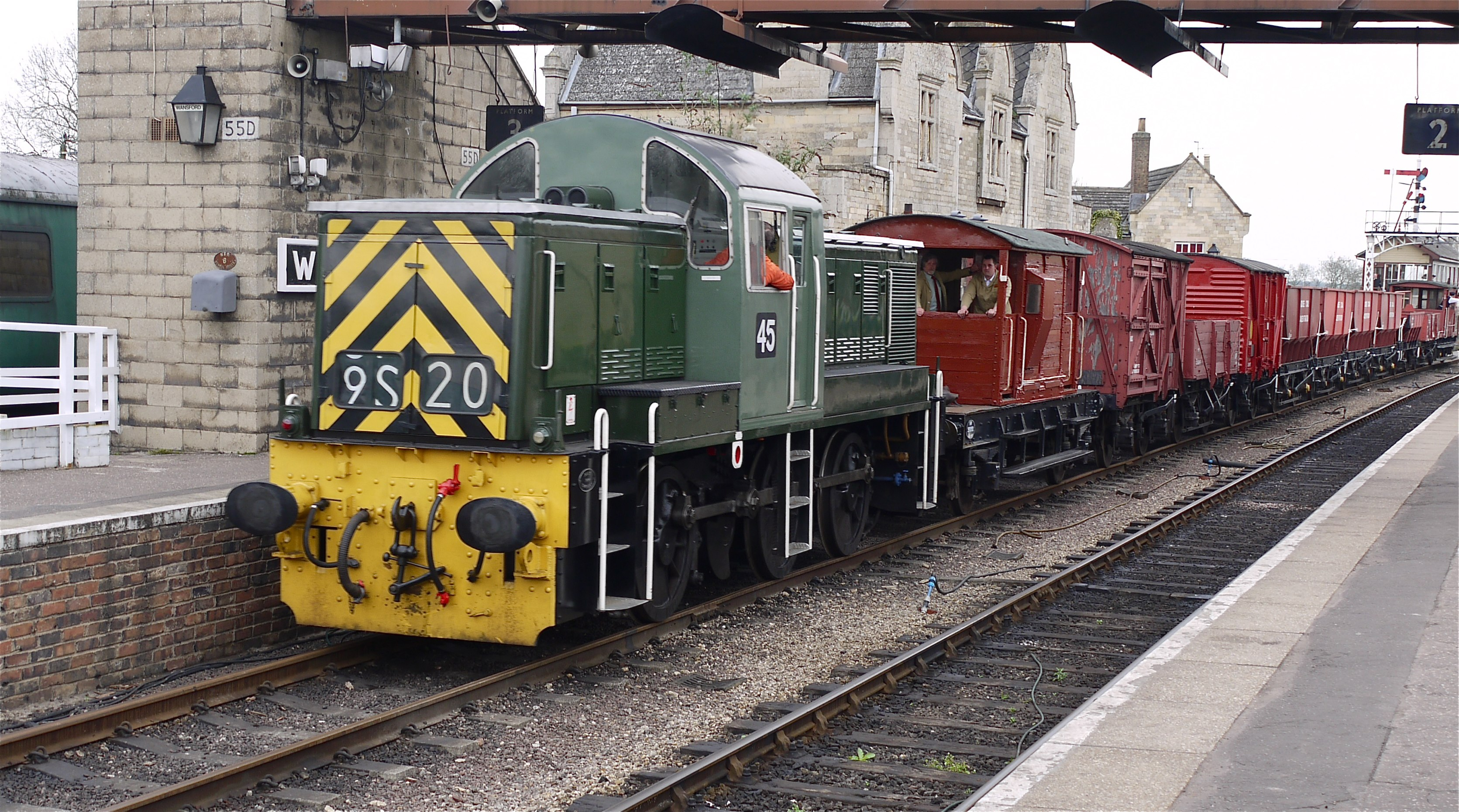
D9520 hauling a goods train.

==== Residents ====
- Polish 0-8-0T Class Śląsk/TKp No. 5485. Built in 1959. Withdrawn Summer 2012 for overhaul. The engine moved to the Flour Mill works for an overhaul and returned to the railway on 26 July 2019. Painted green with a black front end, wheels painted red lined with white.
- Hudswell Clarke 0-6-0T No. 1800 'Thomas' (named by Railway Series author Wilbert Awdry). Built in 1947 for a beet sugar factory in Peterborough. Restricted to around Wansford Yard and hauling Wansford – Yarwell Junction shuttles only, apart from an annual trip to Peterborough. Underwent boiler repairs in 2023 and returned to traffic in January 2024 with a new ten year boiler ticket.
- Danish 0-6-0T Class F No. 656 'Tinkerbell' (unofficial name). Built in 1949. Returned to service in February 2024 after overhaul.

==== Visitors ====
- LNER A1 Tornado no.60163 visited the railway during October 2024.
- LMS Jubilee Class 45596 Bahamas visited the railway in January 2025.
- LNER Class A3 Flying Scotsman and BR Standard Class 7 70000 Britannia visited the railway in February and March 2025 as part of its bicentenary celebrations. Flying Scotsman had previously visited the railway in 2019.
- GWR Large Prairie 4144 is visiting the railway from April to September 2025. It had previously visited in 2021.

=== Steam locomotives undergoing overhaul or restoration ===
- Hudswell Clarke 0-6-0ST No. 1539 'Derek Crouch'. Built in 1924. Undergoing overhaul.
- BR Standard Class 5 4-6-0 No. 73050 'City of Peterborough'. Built in 1954. Withdrawn September 2014 for overhaul which commenced in 2017. Boiler repairs ongoing since 2021.
- Cockerill 0-4-0WT Tram Engine No. 1626 'Toby'. Built in 1890. Undergoing major restoration and rebuild into a GER Class G15.

=== Stored steam locomotives ===
- Hunslet Austerity 0-6-0ST 0-6-0ST 75006. Built in 1943. Awaiting overhaul after being withdrawn in 2004.
- Swedish B Class 4-6-0 No. 101. Built in 1944. On static display after being withdrawn from service in 2005. Disguised as a German D class locomotive, No. 101 was used in the James Bond film Octopussy.
- Hunslet 0-6-0ST No. 1953 'Jacks Green'. Built in 1939. Cosmetically restored into its original industrial livery and is on display with its footplate accessible to visitors.
- Swedish 2-6-2T Class S No. 1178. Built in 1914. Awaiting major overhaul. Purchased by the railway in 2020.

=== Operational diesel locomotives ===
- BR Class 14 0-6-0DH No. 14 029 (D9529)
- BR Class 45 1-Co-Co-1 No. 45 041 "ROYAL TANK REGIMENT"
- Sentinel 4w No. 10202 'Barabel'. In regular use in the yard.
- Sentinel 0-6-0 No. DL83. In service. A regular shunter in the yard.

=== Railcars/diesel multiple units ===
- SJ Class Y7 diesel railcar B-2 'Helga'
- BR Class 143 143602. Former Transport For Wales Unit. Recently arrived and awaiting driving training.
- BR High Speed Train Class 43 power cars 43045 and 43060 along with 3 Mk3 coaches (42355 and 42357, both Trailer Second, and 40904, a Trailer Buffet First) to form a 'short' HST.

=== Track machines ===
- Plasser & Theurer TASC 45 track maintenance vehicle. In service. Used for track maintenance by the civil engineering department, Also available for passenger rides on select days.
- NITEQ Mini Mover 1500e. Battery-powered and used for small shunting operations within the Wansford yard. Donated by Trackwork Limited (Hornsey Depot).

=== Diesel locomotives undergoing overhaul or restoration ===
- Hibberd 0-4-0 No. 2896 'Frank'. Undergoing a major restoration.
- English Electric 0-4-0 No. 1123. Under overhaul

=== Stored diesel locomotives ===
- Ruston & Hornsby 0-4-0DM No. 304469. Stored awaiting major restoration.

== Rolling stock ==
Nene Valley Railway's coaching stock includes not only the BR Mk. I and BR Mk. II carriages commonly seen on preserved railways in the UK, but also pre-war coaching stock from France, Norway, Belgium, Italy, and Denmark.

The railway also owns an ex Southern Railways travelling post office dating to the 1930s, a Victorian era Great Northern Railway parcels van, and an ex London, Midland and Scottish Railway sorting office carriage from the Great Train Robbery. Demonstration 4 coach mail trains have been run between Sutton Cross and Wansford since 2009.

Nene Valley has a large collection of vintage railway wagons, some operational and others undergoing restoration.

== Signalling ==
The Nene Valley Railway is divided into four absolute block sections, controlled by staff and ticket working: Yarwell to Wansford, Wansford to Orton Mere, Orton Mere to Peterborough NVR and Orton Mere to the Fletton Junction with the East Coast Main Line. The signalbox at Orton Mere can be switched out, creating a single section all the way from Wansford to Peterborough and isolating the Fletton Branch, allowing the entire railway to be operated from Wansford; in this case the Peterborough NVR token key is kept physically clipped to the Orton Mere train staff. The staff for the Fletton branch was previously kept at Peterborough powerbox, but is now in possession of the NVR, along with the branch itself.

All points and signals are operated by heritage electrical and mechanical systems. There are two crossovers, one at Wansford and one at Orton Mere, driven by electric point motors; the Orton Mere crossover was converted from all-mechanical in 2015. The majority of the signals are upper-quadrant mechanical semaphore arms, though four lower-quadrant Great Northern somersault signals are mounted on a gantry controlling down trains out of Wansford. Lights at Orton Mere indicate that the crossover has operated correctly, and flashing white lights at Overton indicate that the automatic level crossing warning lights are showing.

Wansford signalbox was built in 1907 around a 30-bar London and North Western Railway lever frame of 60 levers; levers 1 to 15 were removed when the Stamford Line was closed. A later addition is a mechanical gated level crossing, operated from a "ship's wheel" at the West end of the 'box. The gates were replaced with ones made new in-house over the Winter of 2022-23, replacing a previous set made in the 1990s. The Wansford crossing includes wicket gates on the East side for pedestrian traffic when the old Great North Road was a busier route; these can be locked shut from the signalbox, and are currently being replaced.

Access to the loco yard is controlled by a two-lever ground frame released from the signalbox; this is because a point motor was not available at the time, and replacing it is a job which has never been got round to. A single-lever ground frame controlling access to the Carriage and Wagon Shed requires the Wansford-Yarwell train staff. The West end of Wansford station is thoroughly track-circuited; nearby "miniature" relays pick up low-voltage signals applied to the rails and re-transmit them at 50 volts to the signalbox where shelf relays interlock them with the rest of the signalling. Most of the track circuits are DC, but a recently installed AC track circuit extends to the tunnel mouth. At the East end, the points are protected by a mechanical flange bar which prevents them from being unlocked when a train is present.

At Yarwell, the run-round loop is controlled by a single-lever ground frame requiring the train staff. A possible future application of a colour-light signal is to provide an outer home signal to allow shunting to take place on the main line at Wansford while a train is in section.

For demonstrating the Travelling Post Office (TPO) apparatus, a starter signal can be operated from a nearby ground frame, giving the demonstration train a good run-up from a standing start. This signal is normally kept 'off' (allowing trains to pass); to operate the frame one must be in possession of a padlock key, and also a battery to power the electric lever lock in lieu of a release from Wansford signalbox.

Overton Station is equipped with an automatic level crossing which includes the BR prototype solid-state flash circuit driving the flashing warning lights. Access to the sidings here is controlled by a two-lever ground frame requiring the train staff.

Orton Mere signalbox was brought to the Nene Valley Railway in the 1980s, and contains a 12-lever Midland Railway lever frame. When the 'box is not being used, a king lever renders parts of the frame's mechanical interlocking as two disconnected areas of influence, allowing the signals to be pulled off for both directions. The signalling here was substantially augmented in 2015 with the addition of track circuits and the electrification of the crossover. A 'selector locking' mechanism, by which one lever operates one of two signals depending on the position of the points, was removed, but is hoped to be reused at the West end of the station.

Orton Mere signalbox was subject to an arson attack early in 2023, leaving much of the interior damaged and the electrical instruments destroyed. Repairs and improvements were funded by the efforts of two young local enthusiasts, and the 'box was ceremonially re-opened on 9 March 2024.

The signalbox at Peterborough NVR is currently unused, though it is a current project to use it to control access to the Railworld site next-door. It contains a 40-lever Great Northern frame. The run-round loop is controlled at the West end by a two-lever ground frame requiring the Orton Mere - Peterborough NVR train staff, and by a hand-point at the East end.

Communication is mostly carried by hand-held radio, but signal-post telephones are available around Wansford. Wansford and Orton Mere signalboxes are connected by block bell which is regularly used on galas and some service timetables; the block bell in Orton Mere 'box is of the BR modular "penguin" type. A block instrument and a Tyer's No. 9 electric token instrument in Wansford 'box are not used.

== As a film location ==
The line has been a location for filming over 150 TV shows, films, adverts and music videos.

Between 1977 and 1979, many sequences for the BBC's wartime drama Secret Army were filmed here, principally at Wansford station.

In 1982, Wansford station was used for six weeks to shoot scenes featuring Roger Moore and Maud Adams for the James Bond film Octopussy.

Scenes for the biplane/helicopter dogfight from the 1986 film Biggles: Adventures in Time were filmed here, involving one memorable shot where the helicopter piloted by Biggles "lands" on a flat-bed railway carriage.

In 1989, Nene Valley was used for the filming of "Breakthru" (a song by Queen) where the band members all performed on a Great Western Railway steam train no.3822.

Another Bond film GoldenEye was also filmed on the line in 1995. For the film, a Class 20 was disguised as a Russian armoured train. In the film, a tunnel that the train seemingly goes into is in fact a small bridge over the tracks.

In 2008, Penélope Cruz and Daniel Day-Lewis were among the actors who worked on the filming of the live-action film Nine on the Railway.

TV shows filmed here include EastEnders, Casualty, Silent Witness, Dalziel and Pascoe and Poirot.

== See also ==
- Peterborough railway station
- Peterborough East railway station
- Nene Valley (disambiguation)

== Bibliography ==
- Rhodes, John (1976). The Nene Valley Railway. Sheffield: Turntable Publications.
- Waszak, P.J.; Ginns, J.W. (1995). Peterborough's First Railway: Yarwell to Peterborough. Peterborough: Nene Valley Railway.
- Nene Steam. Nene Valley Railway. 1979.
