= Yarwell Junction railway station =

Railway station in Wansford, Cambridgeshire, England

Yarwell Junction
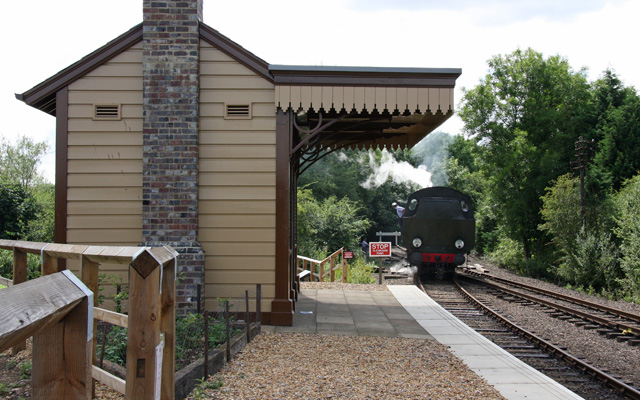
- Yarwell Junction station run-around.

General information
- Location: Wansford, Cambridgeshire; England
- Coordinates: 52.561°N 0.4095°W
- Grid reference: TL079970
- System: Station on heritage railway
- Platforms: 1

History
- Original company: Nene Valley Railway

Key dates
- 2007: opened
Location

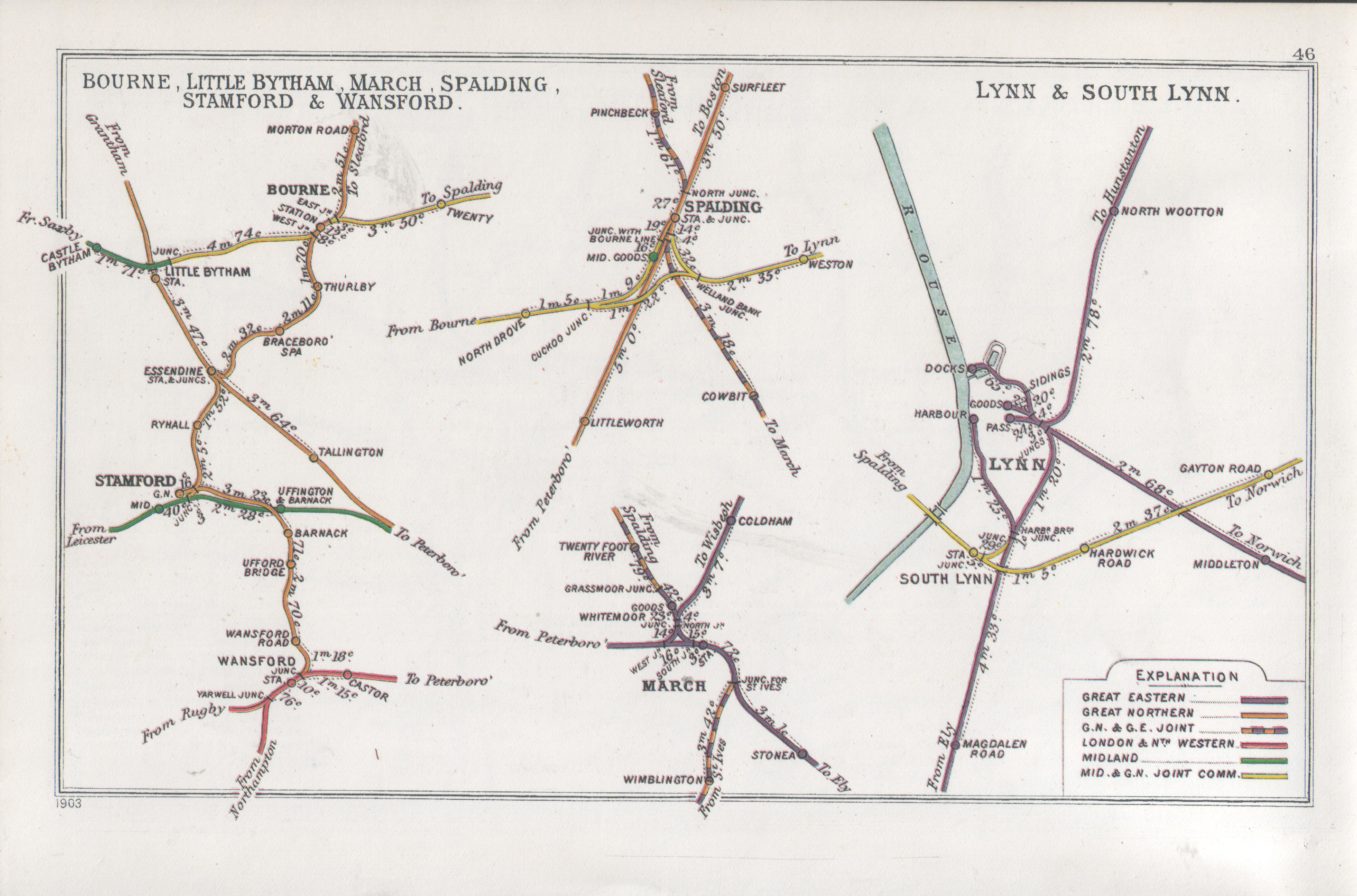
Lines around Wansford in 1903

Yarwell Junction is the current western terminus of the Nene Valley Railway. It opened at Easter 2007.

It was formerly the junction of the Peterborough to Northampton and Peterborough to Market Harborough lines. In April 2006 a track realignment made space for a platform, and this was constructed during 2007. There was never previously a station on the site. The new station is served by footpaths to Nassington and the mill village of Yarwell, but there is no vehicular access.

Yarwell Junction is situated approximately 1 mile (1.6 km) west of Wansford station, at the western end of the 616-yard (563 m) Wansford Tunnel, (the fourth longest tunnel on a UK Heritage Railway).

Preceding station	Heritage railways	Following station
Terminus	Nene Valley Railway	Wansford towards Peterborough Nene Valley
