= Peterborough East railway station =

Former railway station in Cambridgeshire, England

Coordinates: 52.566418°N 0.239776°W

Peterborough East
- Peterborough East Station in 1964

General information
- Location: Peterborough, Soke of Peterborough, Northamptonshire; England
- Grid reference: TL194979
- Platforms: 3

Other information
- Status: Disused

History
- Pre-grouping: Eastern Counties Railway; Great Eastern Railway
- Post-grouping: London and North Eastern Railway; London Midland Region

Key dates
- 2 June 1845: Opened as "Peterborough"
- 1923: Renamed "Peterborough East"
- 17 April 1966: Closed to freight
- 6 June 1966: Closed to passengers
- 21 September 1970: Reopened as a parcels depot
- 23 December 1970: Closed
Location

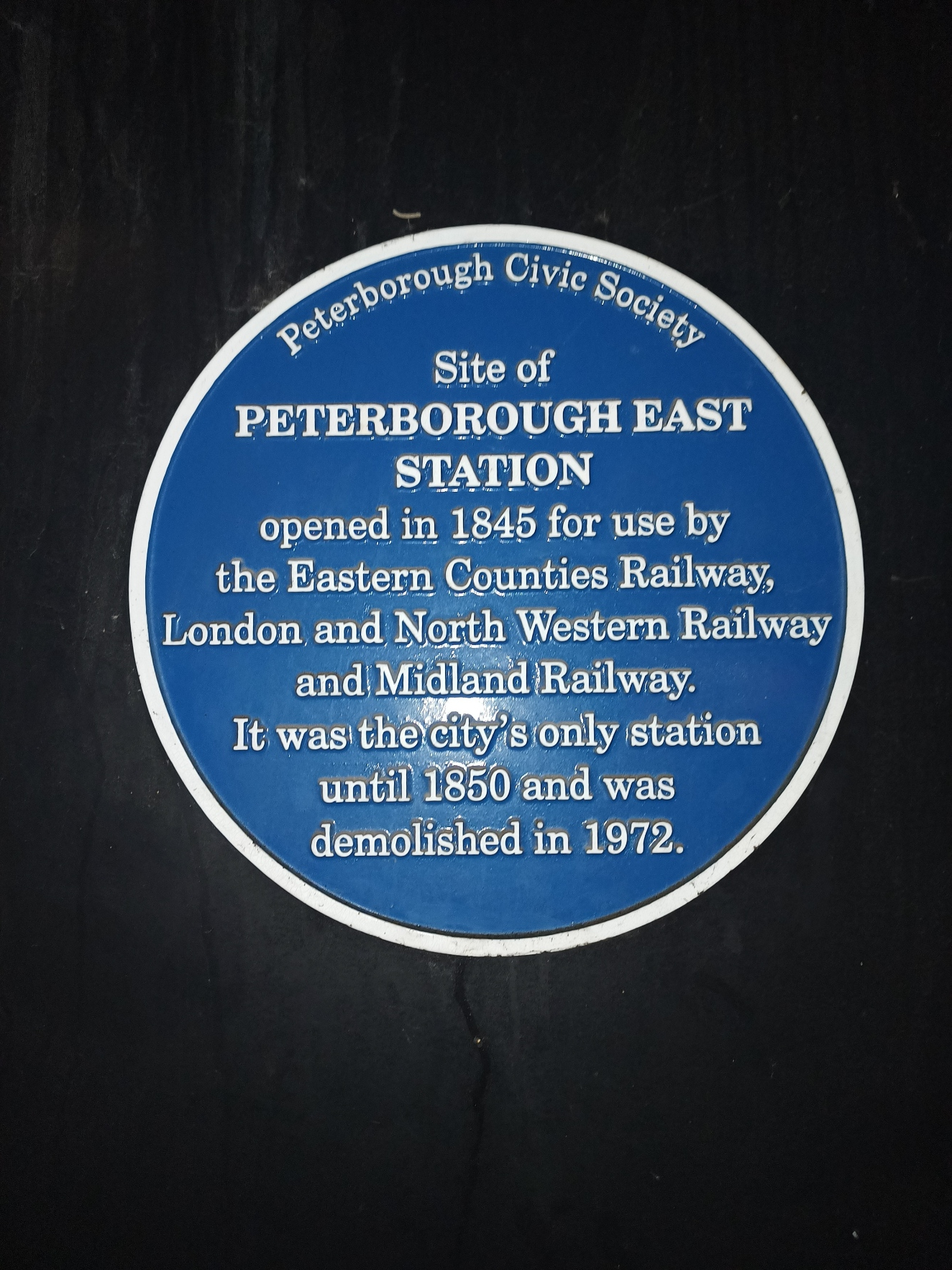
Blue plaque noting site of Peterborough East Station

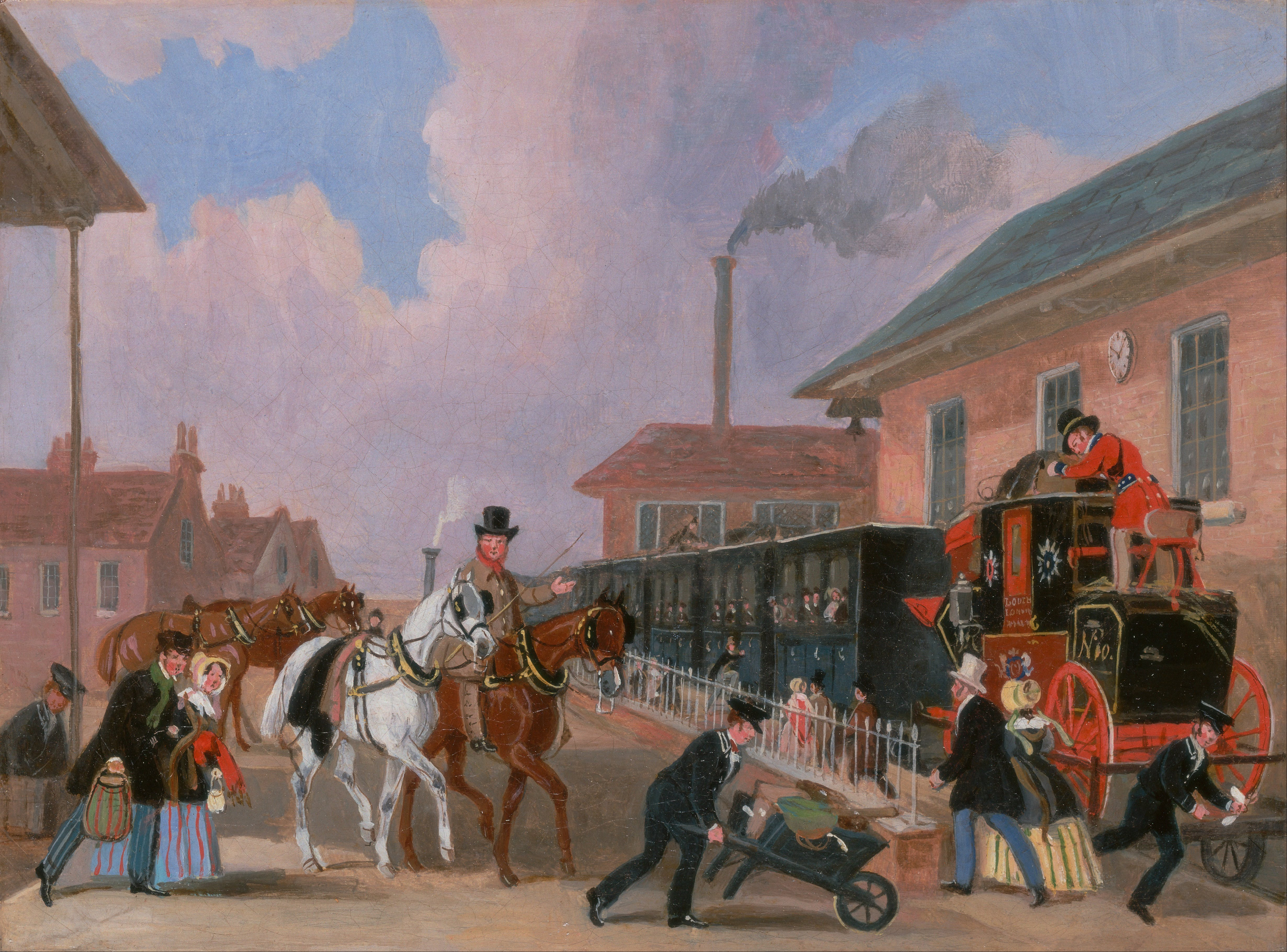
The Louth-London Royal Mail travelling by train from Peterborough East, 1845

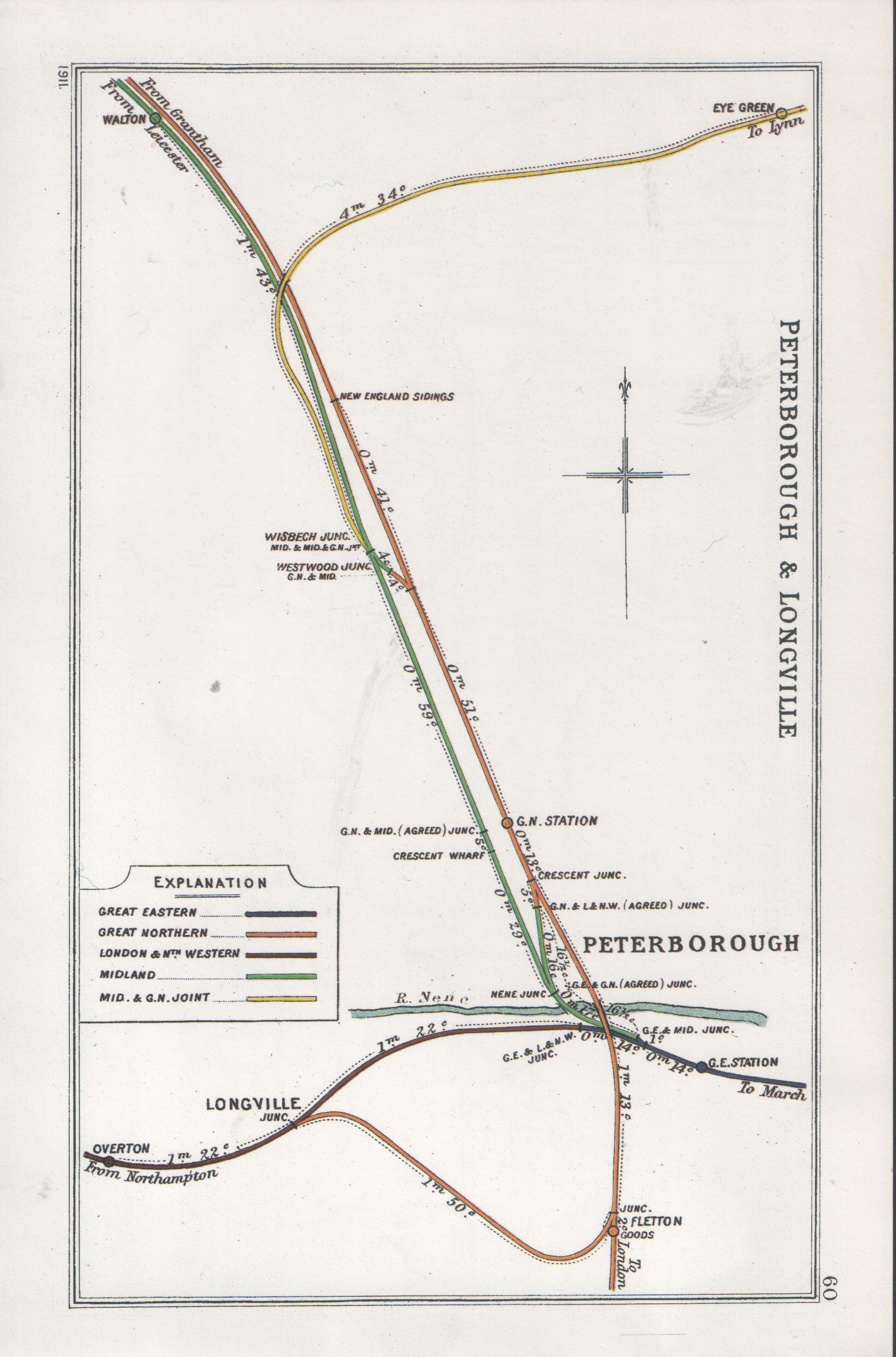
Lines around Peterborough in 1911

Peterborough East was a railway station in Peterborough, England. It was opened on 2 June 1845 and closed to passenger traffic on 6 June 1966. Located on East Station Road just off Town Bridge, only the engine sheds remain. The station had services running west to Northampton and Rugby, as well as to the east to March, Wisbech, and Norwich.

== Opening ==
Station building shown in the Illustrated London News, 1845

Opened on 2 June 1845, Peterborough East was the first station in Peterborough, built by the Eastern Counties Railway (ECR). In 1862 the Eastern Counties Railway became part of the Great Eastern Railway and the station appeared on timetables as "Peterborough (GE)". From 1 July 1923 until its closure it was known as Peterborough East.

The station was designed as the eastern terminus of the London and Birmingham Railway's Northampton and Peterborough Railway and a site was chosen on the south side of the River Nene in the parish of Fletton in the county of Huntingdonshire. The buildings were constructed to the design of the architect John William Livock.

However, in 1845, by the time the line had actually reached the town, the station's construction works were still continuing apace and the Illustrated London News reported that it was still in "a very unfinished state". Nevertheless, once the station did open, it became apparent that its facilities – one platform serving Up and Down trains – were inadequate to handle the traffic on the Northampton line which had proved to be far heavier than had been expected. Only two months after the line's opening, traffic was reported to be more than one-and-a-half times the amount originally estimated and the decision was therefore taken to double the line and enlarge the station. In December 1846 the enlargements were undertaken: refreshment rooms were added, acres of roofing announced its royal agency, as was a larger goods warehouse and still larger engine houses. These additions were certainly necessary as, from January 1847, with the opening of the Ely to Peterborough Line, the station ceased to be a terminus. Furthermore, the following year the Midland Railway opened its Syston and Peterborough Railway which initially terminated at the East station.

The station's facilities were described in an 1849 local directory as follows:

At this station the trains run on one or the other of half a dozen sidings, and under a spacious iron roofing, supported by iron pillars, which form six avenues. The roofing is walled at each side; is of great height, 410 feet long and 228 feet wide. On both sides there are large stone platforms. There is a range of large brick buildings on the right, comprising refreshment and waiting rooms, booking offices, warehouses, engine houses, porters' lodges, etc. The Eastern Counties company enlarged in very much, built new warehouses, engine-houses and a large wharf close to the river, from which there are tramways to the mainline, to facilitate the loading and unloading of goods. Close to the station, ranges of houses, some three stories high, have been built for clerks and others. There is a handsome entrance to the station, with stone pillars and iron gates; a constables' lodge is erected near it.

It therefore appears that by this time the station had acquired an island platform, which in fact was split in two by a wagon line. This wagon line and two others at either end of the platform continued south into a large four-road covered way which was an unusual feature of the station. The covered way did not have platforms and was probably used for the transfer of goods.

== Great Northern Railway ==
In 1850, the Great Northern Railway (GNR) opened its loop line from Peterborough to Bawtry which generated yet more traffic for Peterborough. The GNR was in the midst of constructing its main line from London to York via Peterborough which opened in stages between October 1848 and August 1852; from 1848 to 1850, it ran services to Peterborough East. However, the GNR was desperately short of capital and approached the ECR in autumn 1849 with an offer to purchase the station to which it would run services using a six-mile stretch of the Midland Railway's Syston Branch to the north of Peterborough. Although the ECR declined the offer, it was willing to afford the GNR accommodation at the station. This was not taken up by the GNR's directors who, by December 1849, had decided to construct their own station in the city.

In August 1850, the GNR opened its Peterborough North station. The railway company had nevertheless obtained powers in an act of Parliament to build two short curves to connect its line at Fletton with the ECR line. However, these connecting lines were never constructed. With the opening of the GNR station in August 1850, GNR trains ceased to use the ECR station.

== Further enlargements ==
The decision to place the island platform between the Up and Down lines – so that the Up line was served by two platform sides – resulted in congestion due to platform occupation. Over the years various improvements were carried out in an attempt to remedy this.

In 1880, to cope with growing demand, the former third class ladies' waiting room and the gents' waiting room were converted into an enlarged booking office and dispatch office. The booking office contained three small windows marked GER, LNWR and Midland Railway. In latter days when one booking clerk issued all the tickets, passengers who called at the wrong window and were redirected to the correct window were often confused by seeing the same face there.

In August 1887 part of the station was demolished in a shunting accident. Apparently, a LNWR goods engine shunted some wagons into the station at a higher speed than was normal practice. As they entered the covered way, the wagons jumped the points and collided with the iron columns supporting the south side of the roof, demolishing four bays on that side, as well as the corresponding gable over the two platforms on the other side. In all, a quarter of the entire roof was wrecked. Fortunately, as the incident occurred at 4:20am few people were about and there were no injuries. Although it was suggested that this was an appropriate time to rebuild the whole station – in 1896 plans were made for an extensive new station – these plans were never realised and the damage caused by the shunting accident was never fully repaired. In fact, it appears that all of the covered way was demolished about this time.

== Level crossing ==
To the west of the station was Fletton level crossing on the main road from the south into and out of Peterborough. From the moment the railway arrived, this level crossing proved to be a notorious bottleneck. In 1848, 70 trains per day were involved in shunting operations over the crossing and by 1855 complaints were made that this resulted in the regular closure of the gates for 25 minutes at a time. With the development of the brick industry in the area and the southward spread of the city into Woodston and Fletton the inconvenience increased. It was particularly bad during the fair when crowds of people and herds of nervous animals were crushed together. For many years the GER chose to ignore numerous petitions and protests.

In 1872 the GER finally built a pedestrian footbridge over the level crossing and in 1874 agreed to transfer many of its shunting operations to other yards. Animals and vehicles, however, still had to face long delays. It was this level crossing and the restricted width of the narrow street which limited the development of Peterborough's tramway network to areas north of the River Nene.

Negotiations between the GER and the local authorities for a new bridge were well-advanced by 1913 but the First World War resulted in the scheme being dropped. It was not until 20 September 1934 that the present road viaduct, spanning both the river and railway, was opened. This entailed the demolition of the Crown public house, some GER railway cottages and the removal of Fletton Road Junction Signalbox which closed in May 1934. Until 1920, when a wheel was installed, two gatemen were required for each turn of duty. During the late 1920s and early 1930s the East station was resignalled; in April 1932 Peterborough East Box, which was on a gantry at the west end of the station over the main platform line opened.

== Final years ==
Nationalisation of the railways in 1948 resulted in British Rail (BR) taking over responsibility for the station. With the advent of the 1955 Modernisation Plan, the station's days were numbered.

On 12 May 1963, the old timber bridge over the river at Stanground, known as the Black Bridge, was destroyed by fire. Until 9 June, when the line was reopened to normal traffic, trains had to be diverted via Spalding and the GER/GNR joint line. Over a hundred years previously, in March 1856, the original wooden bridge was already reported to be "positively dangerous" and services crossed the old bridge on the Up line at a rate of only 4 mph and on the Down line at only 2 mph. Plans to replace the structure with a brick structure were never realised. The new replacement wooden bridge – which now consisted of only two tracks (there had been 5 on the old bridge) – was rebuilt on the previous piles which were undamaged below ground and water levels. Track and signalling modifications were required to connect the yards at each end of the bridge.

Although passenger services on the Northampton line ceased on 2 May 1964, the following year around 40 trains per day were still calling at Peterborough East. However, on 6 June 1966, with the closure of the Rugby line from Yarwell Junction to Seaton, Peterborough East finally closed to passenger traffic. This, however, did not mark the end of the station as it was converted into a parcels centre. The station became the base for the East Anglia British Rail Universal Trolley Equipment (BRUTE) service and handled some 15,000 parcels a day. On 29 June 1970, the station finally became redundant when operations were transferred to the new British Rail Express Parcel Terminal built on the site of the New England locomotive sheds. In July 1981, the Post Office took over the terminal when BR withdrew its unprofitable Collected/Delivered parcels business.

In 1971 a possible alternative use for the East station was put forward by the Peterborough Locomotive Society (PLS), the predecessor of the Peterborough Railway Society. With the support of Peterborough City Council, the Peterborough Development Corporation and the Huntingdon and Peterborough County Council, the PLS proposed that the National Railway Museum – which had previously been located at Clapham – should relocate to Peterborough instead of moving to another London site or to York. The East station and former locomotive shed could be developed into a static museum. The unique advantage of the site was the possibility of a link to a live museum, built on the former LNWR locoshed site, from which a preserved steam railway could run along the Nene Valley to Wansford. However, as is now well-known, the National Railway Museum eventually moved to York.

== The station today ==
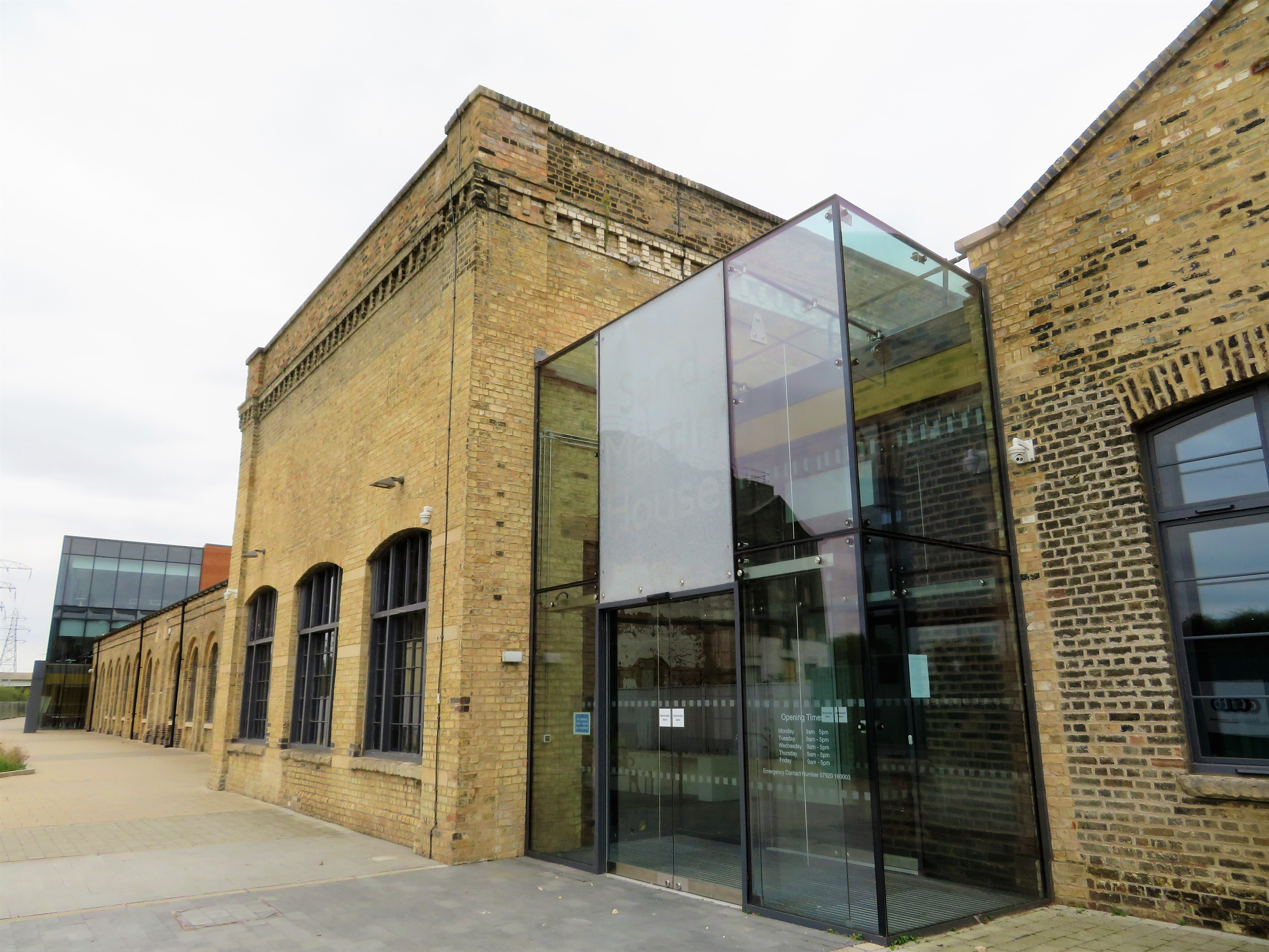
Redevelopment of the engine shed as Sand Martin House offices

In 1972 the East Station was demolished and only part of the main platform with a bay at the east end remained, these have now gone as well following the South Bank redevelopment. In 1977 the turntable from the locoyard, which had been retained to turn track maintenance machines, was purchased by the PRS and moved to Wansford. After the rebuilding of the Black Bridge in 1963, a 10 mph speed limit had been imposed. With the demolition of the replacement bridge, a new concrete bridge was opened in June 1981 which allowed the speed limit to be raised to the normal limit.

Starting in 2017, redevelopment work has taken place on the site as the new Fletton Quays mixed-use development, which includes new government offices, more than 350 riverside apartments in high-rise tower blocks, and some shops, including a now closed Greggs and a Bewiched Coffee. A Hilton Hotel was also planned for the site, to open in March 2023.

Peterborough East station sign inside Sand Martin House

The large Victorian rail engine shed has been renovated into Peterborough City Council's new office, Sand Martin House. Nevertheless, the Ely to Peterborough Line continues to run through the site and to provide a well-used link between East Anglia and the Midlands.

== Former services ==
Preceding station	Disused railways	Following station
Terminus	London and North Western Railway; Peterborough to Rugby	Orton Waterville
Terminus	London and North Western Railway; Peterborough to Northampton	Orton Waterville
Terminus	Midland Railway; Peterborough to Leicester	Peterborough North
Terminus	Great Eastern Railway; Peterborough to Cambridge	Whittlesea

== See also ==
- Peterborough railway station
- Peterborough Nene Valley railway station
- Nene Valley Railway
