= Peterborough Nene Valley railway station =

Heritage railway station

Coordinates: 52.567705°N 0.247766°W

Peterborough Nene Valley
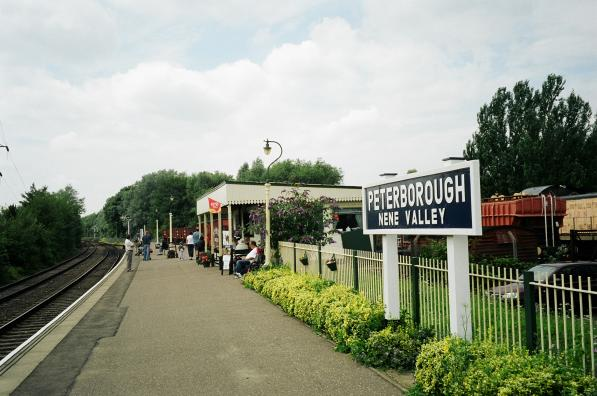
- The station platform looking towards Orton Mere.

General information
- Location: Peterborough, Cambridgeshire; England
- Grid reference: TL188981
- System: Station on heritage railway
- Manager: Nene Valley Railway
- Platforms: 1

Key dates
- 1986: opened
Location

Peterborough Nene Valley is a station on the Nene Valley Railway and is the current eastern terminus of the line. Situated adjacent to Railworld, the station can be found west of the East Coast Main Line, close to the Junction of London Road and Oundle Road.

The station was built in 1986 as part of the Nene Valley Railway's Peterborough extension. The station is built on its current site because the NVR could not access the original Peterborough East station site. The now demolished Peterborough East can be located by the extant railway sheds and platform face close to the (now demolished) Matalan store located on East Station Road off London Road.

== Access ==
The station provides access to the extreme eastern end of the Nene park, and can be accessed by foot through the Rivergate shopping centre and from Peterborough Town bridge. The station is located within a ten minute walk of Peterborough City centre, well known for its historic Norman Cathedral.

== Location ==
An Environmental centre is currently being built across the River Nene from the main part of Peterborough Nene Valley Station. It occupies land that used to be a freight yard. It was also used as a coal dump, providing fuel for the Power station. This particular power station was demolished a considerable time ago. One of the primary exhibits is a large, steel globe, at a scale of 1000 miles to 1 ft. Mountains are sculpted on in polyfiller, and the whole globe is rotated at the appropriate angle (23.5 degrees) by the wind generator on the roof. This development relies upon donations, and so its progress continues to be slow, and has been so for many years.

Preceding station	Heritage railways	Following station
Orton Mere towards Yarwell Junction	Nene Valley Railway	Terminus
