= King's Cliffe =

Village in Northamptonshire, England

Coordinates: 52.566°N 0.519°W

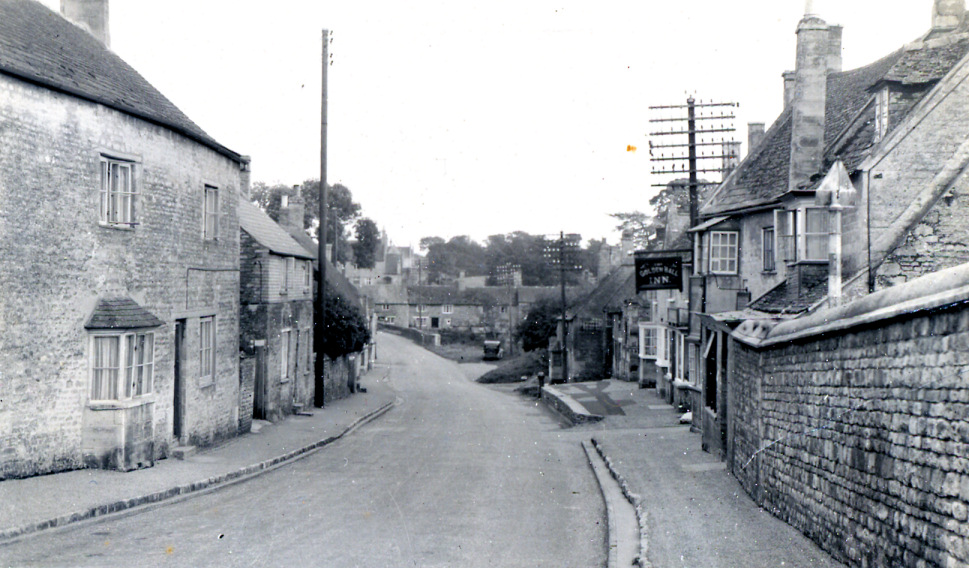
- The village in the early 1950s

- Location within Northamptonshire
- Population: 1,585 (2021 census)
- OS grid reference: TL0097
- Unitary authority: North Northamptonshire
- Ceremonial county: Northamptonshire
- Region: East Midlands
- Country: England
- Sovereign state: United Kingdom
- Post town: Peterborough
- Postcode district: PE8
- Dialling code: 01780
- Police: Northamptonshire
- Fire: Northamptonshire
- Ambulance: East Midlands
- UK Parliament: Corby and East Northamptonshire
- Website: King's Cliffe Parish Council

King's Cliffe (variously spelt Kings Cliffe, King's Cliff, Kings Cliff, Kingscliffe) is a village and civil parish on Willow Brook, a tributary of the River Nene, about 9 miles (14 km) northeast of Corby in North Northamptonshire. The parish adjoins the county boundary with the City of Peterborough and the village is about 12 miles (19 km) west of the city centre. The village is not far from the Northamptonshire boundaries with both Cambridgeshire and Lincolnshire, and is about 6 miles (10 km) south of Stamford.

== Population ==
The 2001 census recorded a parish population of 1,137 people, increasing to 1,202 at the 2011 Census. This later increased to 1,585 at the 2021 Census.

The 1871 census recorded a parish population of 1,259. The 1891 census recorded the parish population as having fallen to 1,082, occupying 262 "inhabited houses"

King's Cliffe is very small but is growing in size. There is a school named King's Cliffe Endowed Primary. It used to be located next to John Wooding's Groceries but in recent years, a new building was developed on King's Forest. This new school is very large in size and is very advanced.

== Parish church ==
The Church of England parish church of All Saints has a central tower that is Norman, with late 13th century upper parts and broach spire. The nave has a Decorated Gothic west window and there are north and south aisles with 14th century arcades. The font is also 14th century. Later features are the Perpendicular Gothic clerestory, roof and remodelling of the north and south arches supporting the tower. Inside the church is a monument erected in 1623 to the Thorpe family, whose descendant John Thorpe (1565–1655) was a notable Elizabethan and Jacobean architect.

== History ==
Hall Yard Farmhouse was built in 1603. Inside the house, Dr Law's Music Room has an 18th-century Georgian coved ceiling with decoration in the style of Robert Adam. Law's Chapel, also 18th century, is nearby.

Parts of King's Cliffe Manor House are early 17th century.

In the summer of 1845, the Reverend Miles Joseph Berkeley, the rector of All Saints' church, proposed, after observing potatoes from near the village struck by potato blight, that the causative agent of the blight was a fungus. This was contradictory to theories at the time, which suggested that the fungus was merely a symptom of decay, and not the causative agent of the blight. Berkeley labelled the fungus he found Botrytis infestans, now known as Phytophthora infestans.

King's Cliffe is unusual in having three sets of almshouses. The John Thorpe Almshouses were built in 1668, the Widows' Almshouses in 1749 and the Spinsters' Almshouses in 1754. The Widows' and Spinsters' almshouses were part of a set of charities founded by Rev. Dr William Law (1686–1761) and his disciple, Mrs Elizabeth Hutcheson. A house dating from about 1700 was made a Schoolmaster's House in 1745, and next to it the Boys' School was built in 1748. From 1752 the Schoolmaster's House became Law's Library, which housed Law's religious books and lent them to people of King's Cliffe and neighbouring towns.

King's Cliffe railway station was on a branch line that ran between Seaton and Wansford. The London and North Western Railway opened it in 1879 and British Railways closed it in 1966.

Located between the village and neighbouring Wansford, Cambridgeshire, RAF King's Cliffe became operational in October 1941. the new airfield was located on the site of a former Royal Flying Corps landing ground that was used in 1916 and 1917 by No. 75 Squadron RAF for Home Defence duties. On opening in 1941 it was a Royal Air Force Fighter Station and was initially home to No. 266 Squadron RAF who were followed by No. 616 Squadron RAuxAF and then No. 485 Squadron RNZAF. From 1943 the airfield hosted a number of non operation units of the RAF and US Eighth Air Force. From August 1943 until October 1945 the airfield was assigned to the US 20th Fighter Group who flew missions over occupied Europe. Post-War the airfield was used briefly as a repatriation centre for German Prisoners of War and also for ammunition storage. The site was returned to agricultural use in 1959. In July 2024 a small museum opened on the site of the airfield.

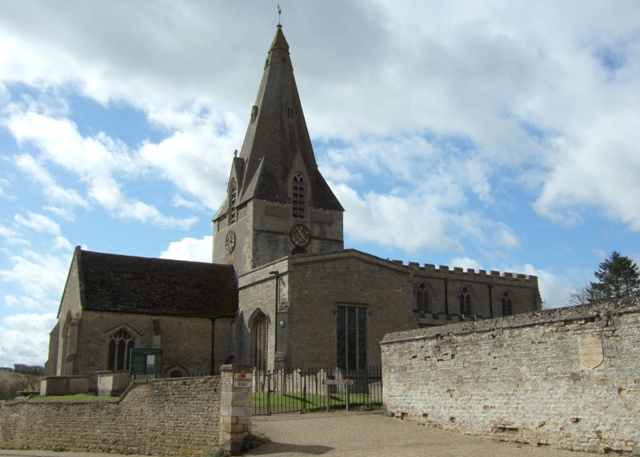
King's Cliffe church

== Notable residents ==
- Miles Joseph Berkeley FRS – mycologist and Perpetual Curate (Vicar) of Apethorpe and Woodnewton who lived in Kingscliffe 1833–1869, opening a school in 1838.
- Ruth Ellen Berkeley (1845–1914) – scientific botanical illustrator was born and brought up in the village.
- Henry Bonney D.D. (1780–1862) – churchman and author
- James Humphreys – English crime writer, a former resident of the neighbouring village of Apethorpe. His novel Sleeping Partner is partly set in King's Cliffe.
- William Law (1686–1761) – Church of England divine
- John Thorpe (1565–1655) – architect
- Fenech-Soler – electronic band
- Craig Revel Horwood – Author, dancer, choreographer, conductor, theatre director, and former drag queen. Currently living in King's Cliffe.
- Kathryn Wanless – Children's book author and illustrator.

== Village events ==
Kings Cliffe has a number of events that occur annually. These include but are not limited to:

- The Village Duck Race – A charity event raising money for The Underground.
- Cliffe Fest – A family friendly festival raising money for Kings Cliffe Endowed Primary School and local charities.
- Plant Sale – A charity event run by The Gardening Club raising funds for Kings Cliffe Parish Church.
- Village Bonfire – A charity event raising funds for the Kings Cliffe Parish Church.
- Village Produce Show – A village event run by the Gardening Club.
- King's Cliffe Airfield Museum Summer Open Day - An event held at the museum on the site of the old airfield with military and civilian vehicle display and a range of displays on local history.
