= Articulated car =

Consist of railway cars sharing axles or trucks (bogies)

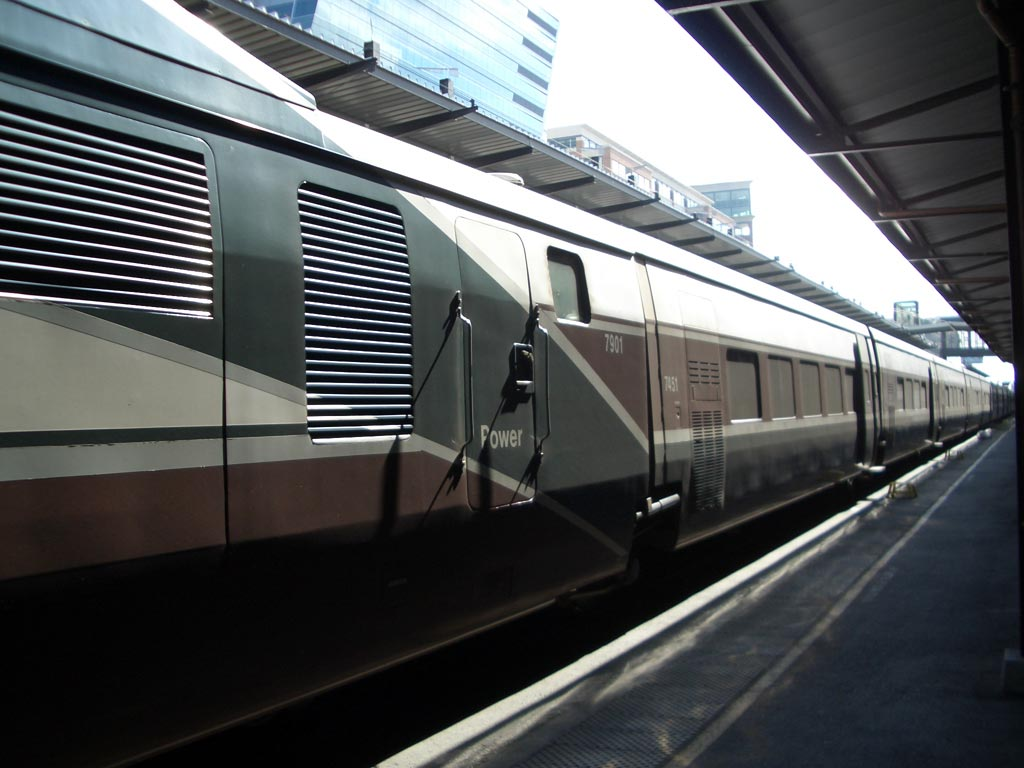
Amtrak Cascades operates tilting Talgo permanently coupled trainsets

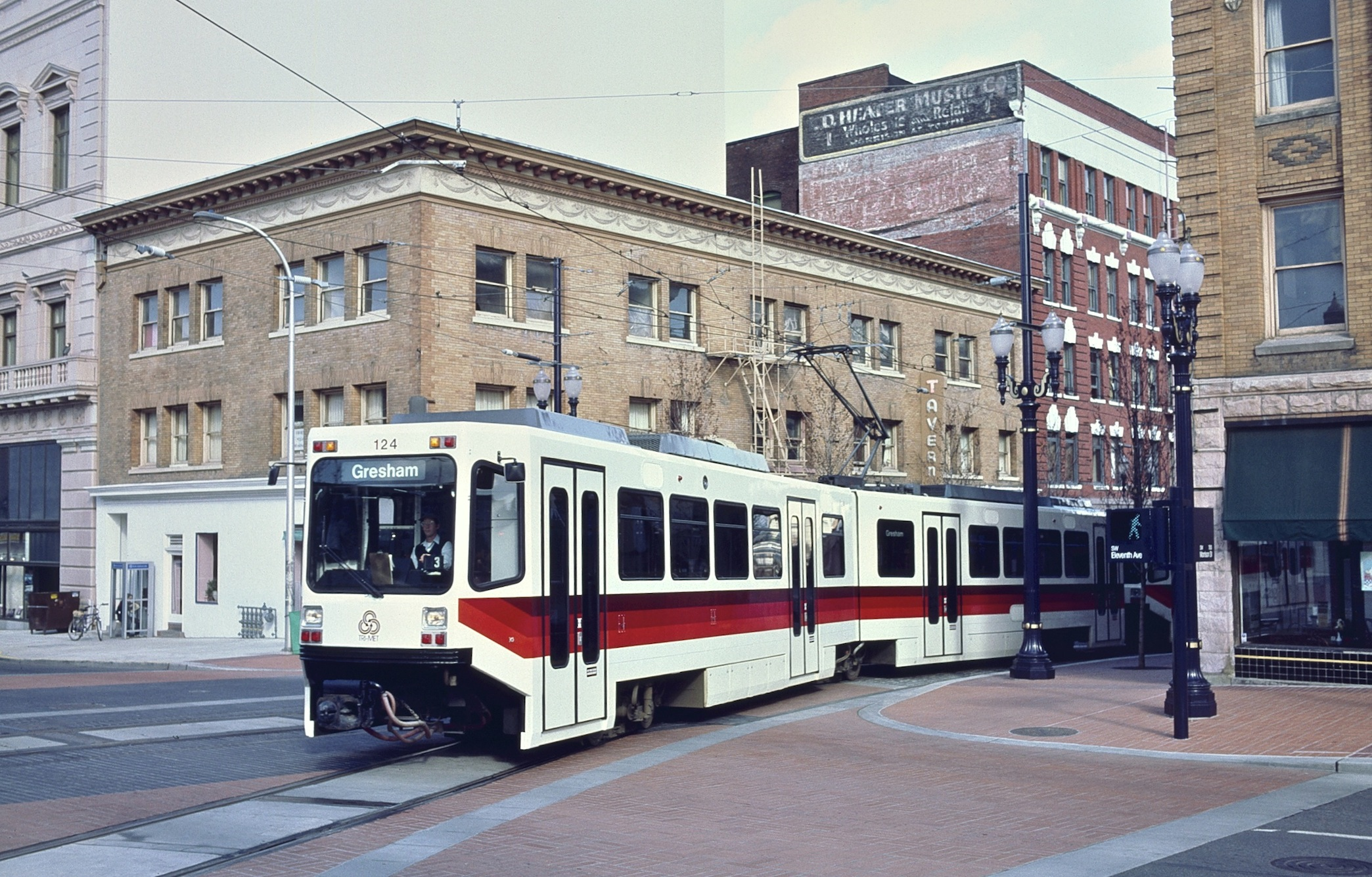
Bombardier articulated MAX LRV turning in Portland, Oregon

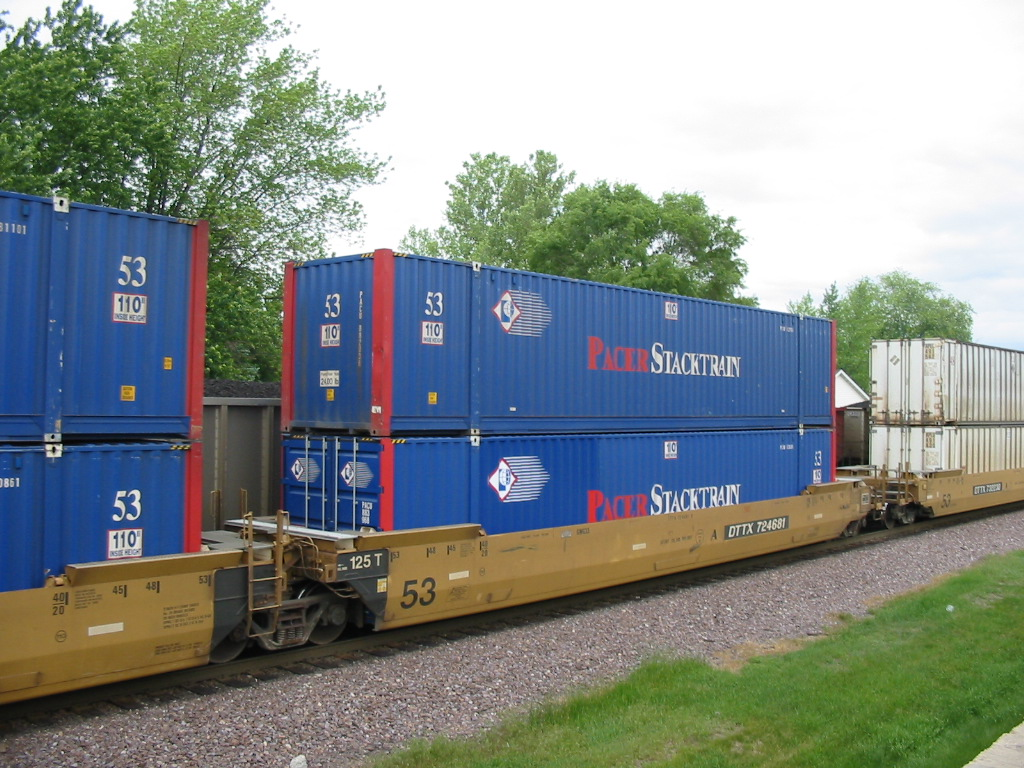
Articulated well cars with containers

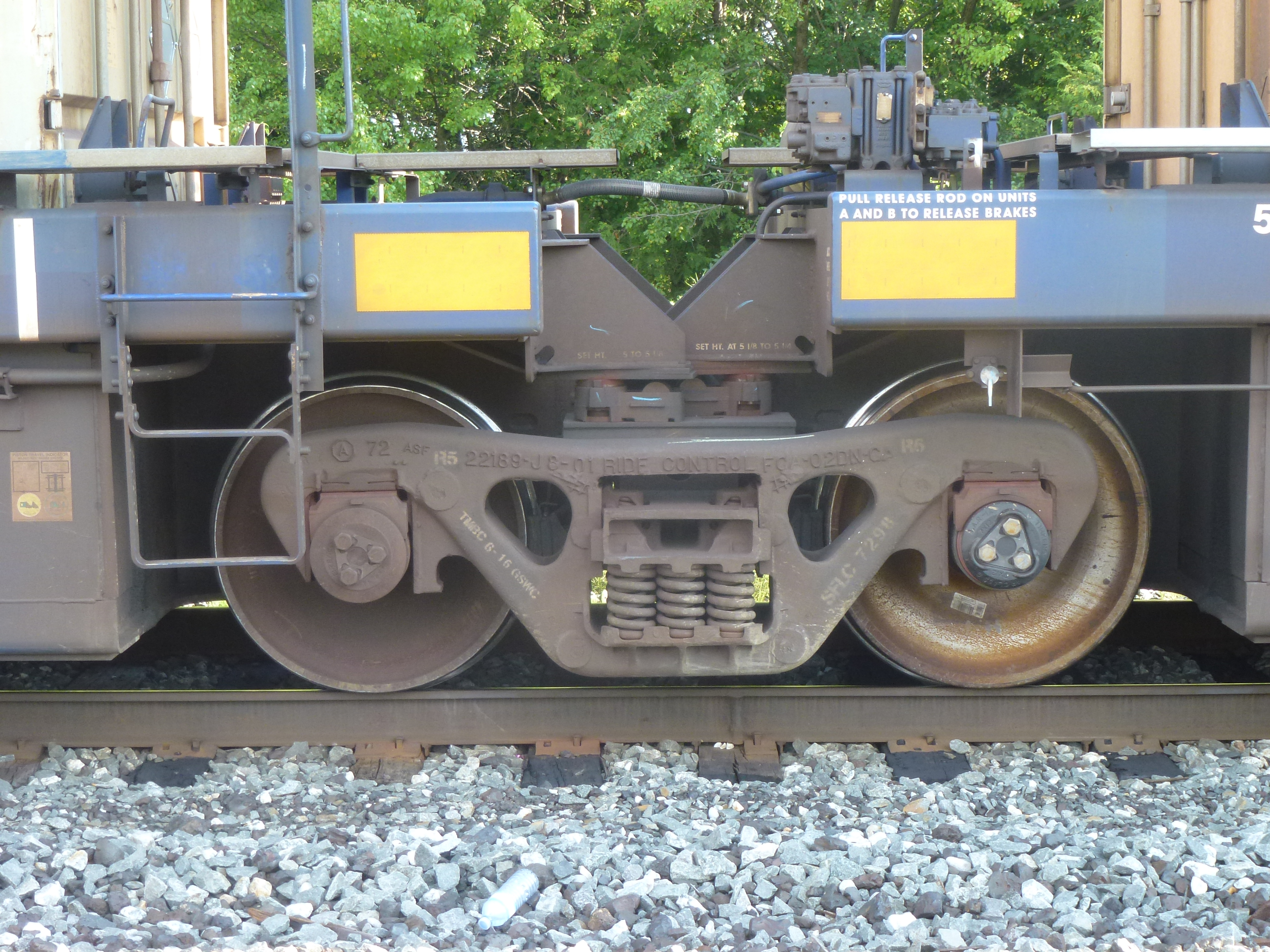
Closeup of a regular truck with specially adapted side bearings between two sections of an articulated well car

Articulated cars are rail vehicles which consist of a number of cars which are semi-permanently attached to each other and share common Jacobs bogies or axles and/or have car elements without axles suspended by the neighbouring car elements. They are much longer than single passenger cars. Because of the difficulty and cost of separating each car from the next, they are operated as a single unit, often called a trainset.

== Passenger cars ==
Articulated passenger cars are becoming increasingly common in Europe and the US. The passageways between the car elements are permanently attached. There is a safety benefit claimed that if the train derails, it is less likely to jackknife and modern construction techniques prevent telescoping.

Articulated cars are not, however, a new idea. Many railways in Britain during the first half of the 20th century frequently rebuilt older, shorter cars into articulated sets, and the Great Northern Railway in Britain built suburban car sets new. In the 1930s, a number of streamlined trains built for the London and North Eastern Railway also made use of articulated technology.

== Freight cars ==
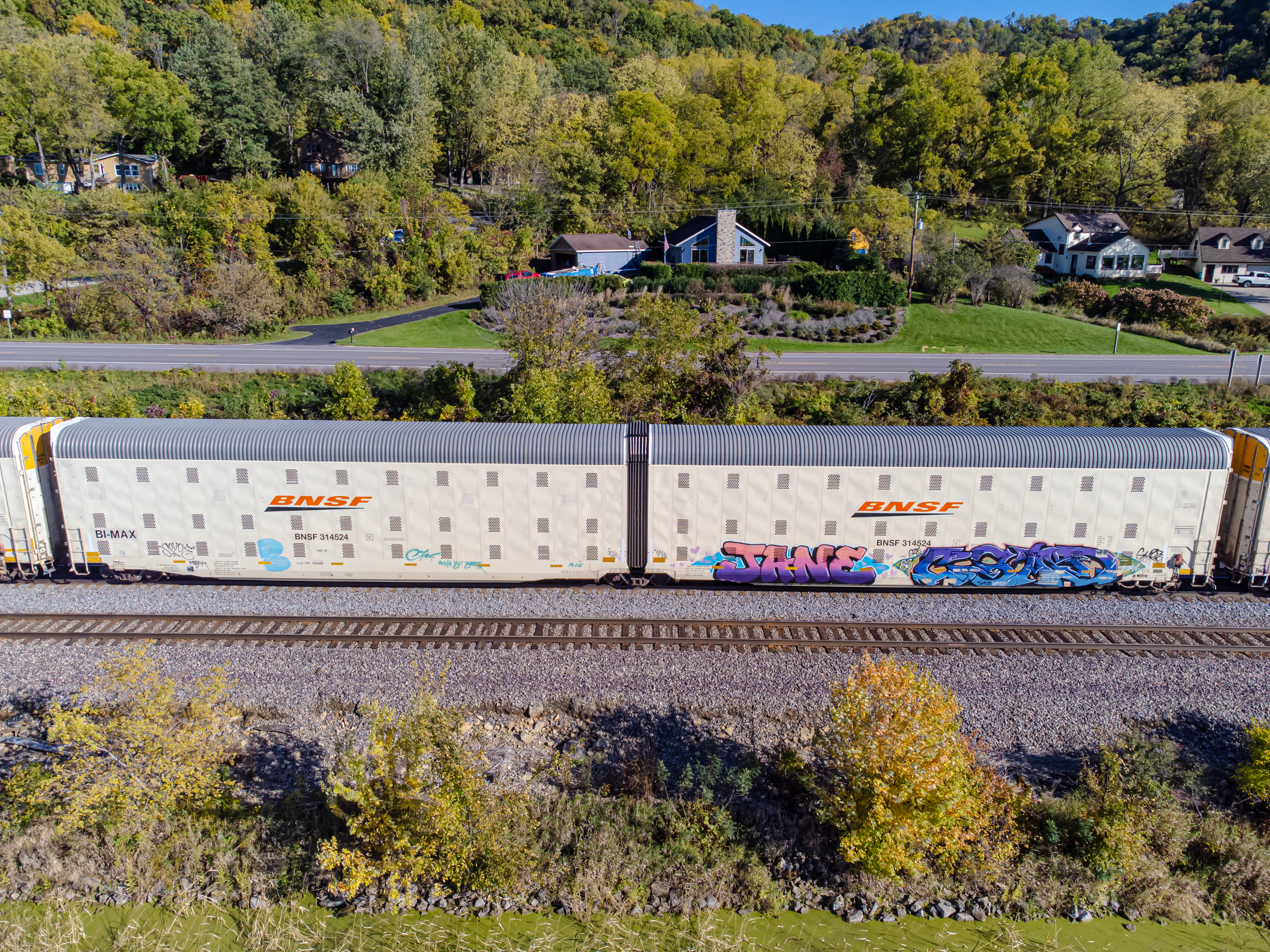
Articulated auto-racks

Manufacturers such as Gunderson make articulated, low-floor "well" cars, articulated trailer carriers and articulated autoracks. At 34 m (111 ft 6 9/16 in) long, Modalohr is also articulated.

== Advantages and disadvantages ==
Articulated cars have a number of advantages. They save on the total number of wheels and bogies, reducing initial cost, weight, noise, vibration and maintenance expenses. Further, movement between passenger cars is safer and easier than with traditional designs.

Disadvantages primarily relate to lesser operational flexibility. For example, additional cars cannot readily be added to an articulated trainset to accommodate peaks in traffic volume and a mechanical malfunction in one car or power unit can disable an entire trainset. Furthermore, the axle load is higher compared to conventional train sets due to the reduced number of wheels and bogies.

== See also ==
- Articulated Light Rail Vehicle
- Articulated trams
- Articulated vehicle
- Illinois Central 121
- Stadler FLIRT
- Talgo
- TGV
