= King's Cliffe railway station =

Former railway station in Northamptonshire, England

King's Cliffe
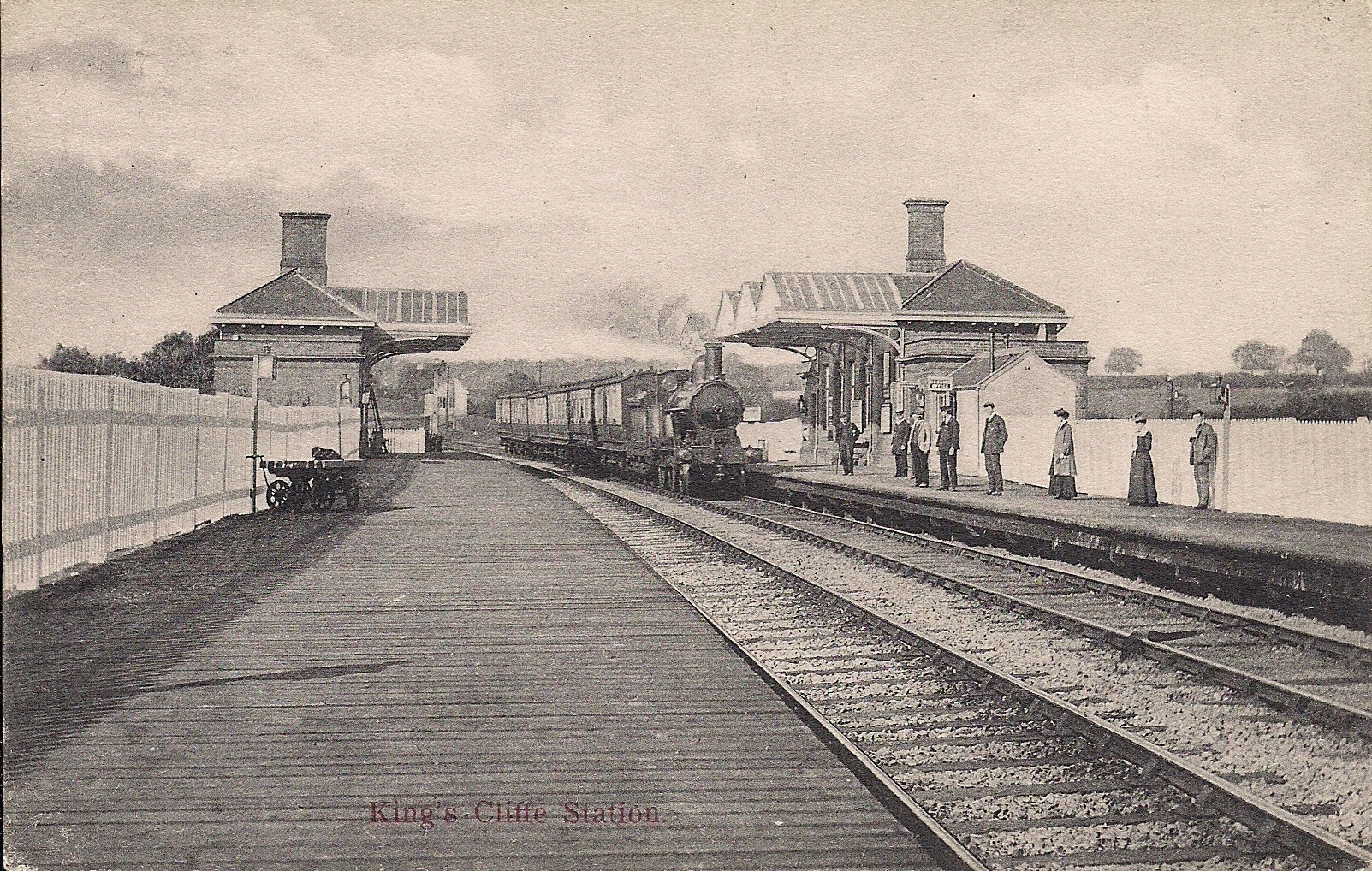

General information
- Location: King's Cliffe, North Northamptonshire; England
- Coordinates: 52.5673°N 0.5120°W
- Grid reference: TL009976
- Platforms: 2

Other information
- Status: Disused

History
- Original company: London and North Western Railway
- Pre-grouping: London and North Western Railway
- Post-grouping: London Midland and Scottish Railway

Key dates
- 1 November 1879: Opened
- 6 June 1966: Closed to passengers
- 3 June 1968: Closed completely
Location

King's Cliffe railway station is a former railway station in King's Cliffe, Northamptonshire. It was owned by the London and North Western Railway, being situated on their line between Market Harborough and Peterborough, but from 1883 to 1916 was also served by trains of the Great Northern Railway.

The station was opened on 1 November 1879 and closed to passengers on 6 June 1966. On that date the section from Rugby (Midland) to Kings Cliffe was closed completely, but the line east of Kings Cliffe station remained open for goods traffic. On 3 June 1968 Kings Cliffe station was closed to goods along with the track to Nassington station where a private siding and the line to Yarwell Junction at Wansford remained in use until 1971 to serve a sand and gravel quarry.

Preceding station	Disused railways	Following station
Wakerley & Barrowden	London and North Western Railway; Rugby to Peterborough East	Nassington
Wakerley & Barrowden	Great Northern Railway; Leicester Belgrave Road to Peterborough North	Nassington
