= Ruth Ellen Berkeley =

Mycologist and scientific illustrator

- Born: 1845; King's Cliffe, Northamptonshire
- Died: 16 June 1914 (aged 68); Devon, England
- Known for: botanical illustration

Ruth Ellen Berkeley (bapt. 1 October 1845 – 16 June 1914) was an English mycologist, collector of fungi specimens and scientific botanical illustrator. She is known for her specimen collections as well as her illustrations of British fungi particularly in Mordecai Cubitt Cooke's book Illustrations of British Fungi (Hymenomycetes). Her father, the mycologist Miles Joseph Berkeley, named a fungal species Agaricus ruthae (now known as Pleurotus ruthae) in her honour.

== Gallery ==
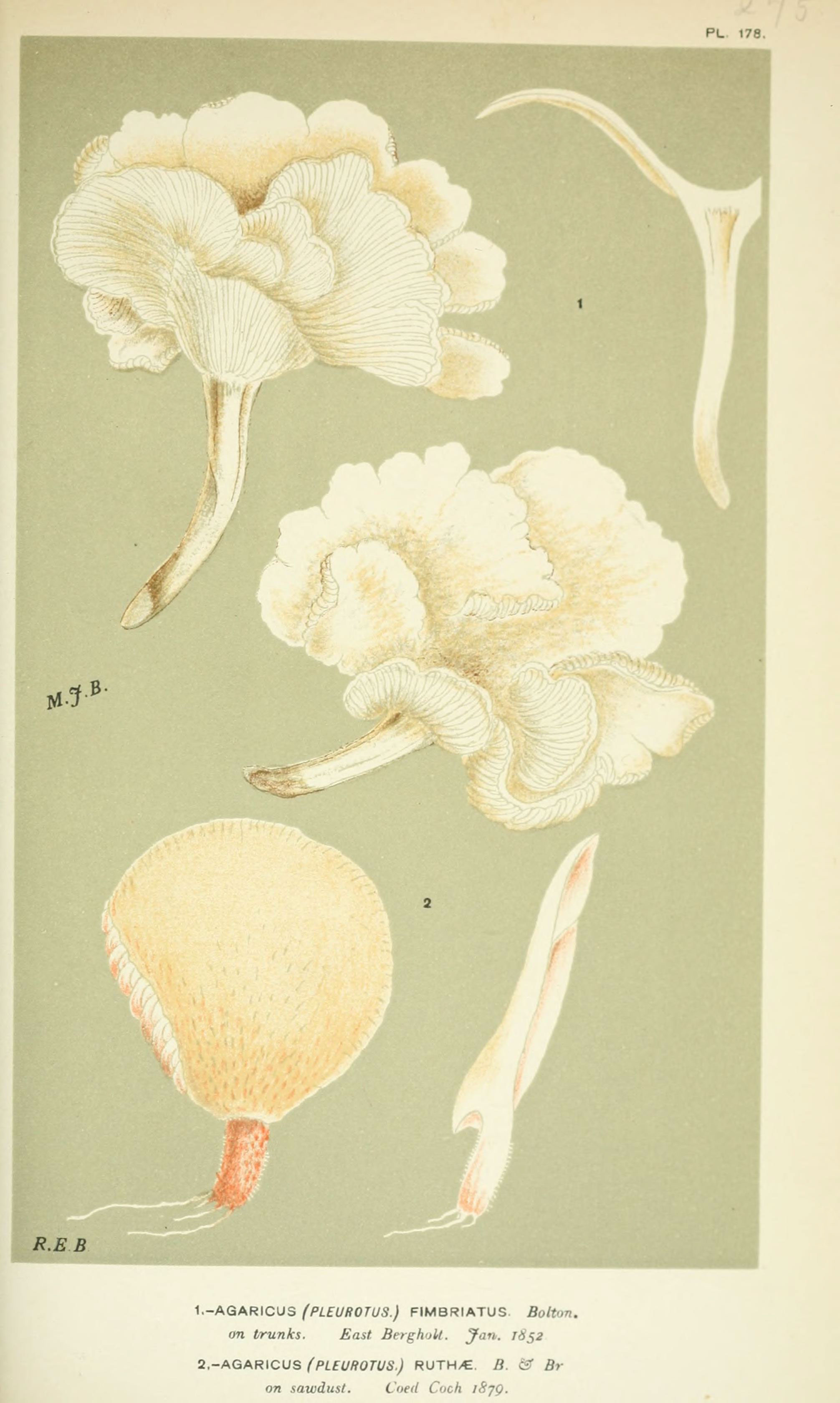
Ruth's illustration of the fungus that bears her name; her initials appear at bottom of the plate.

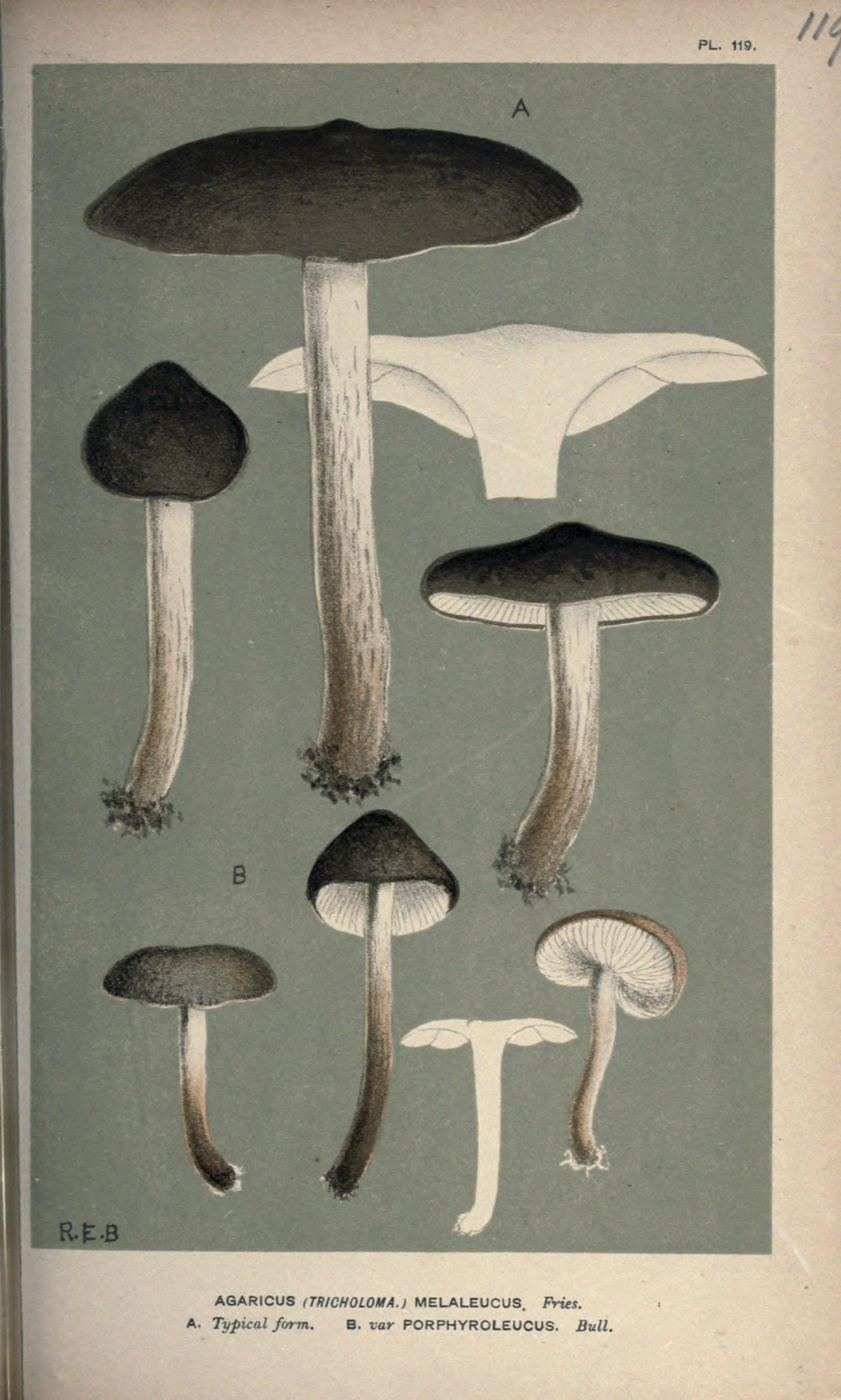

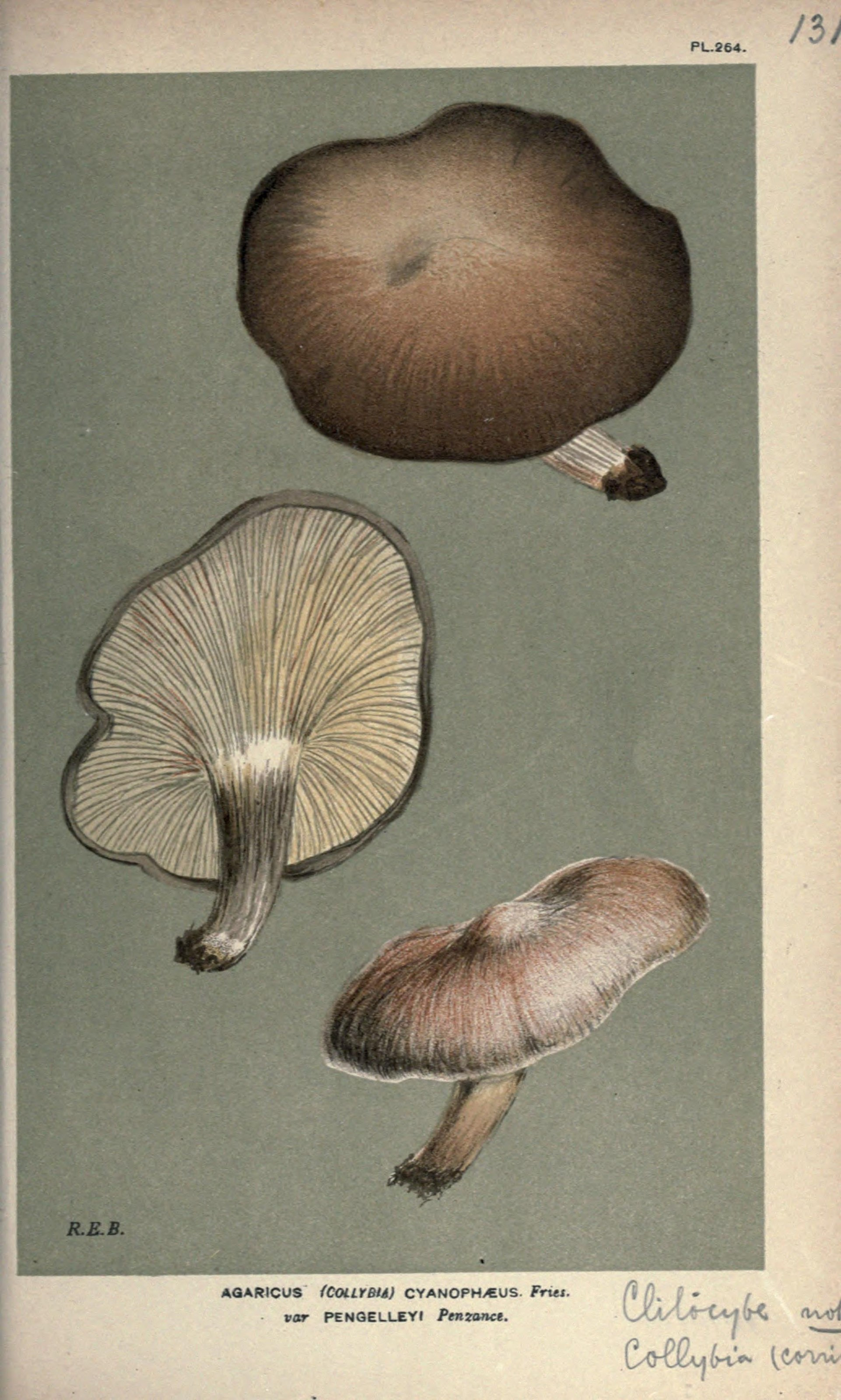

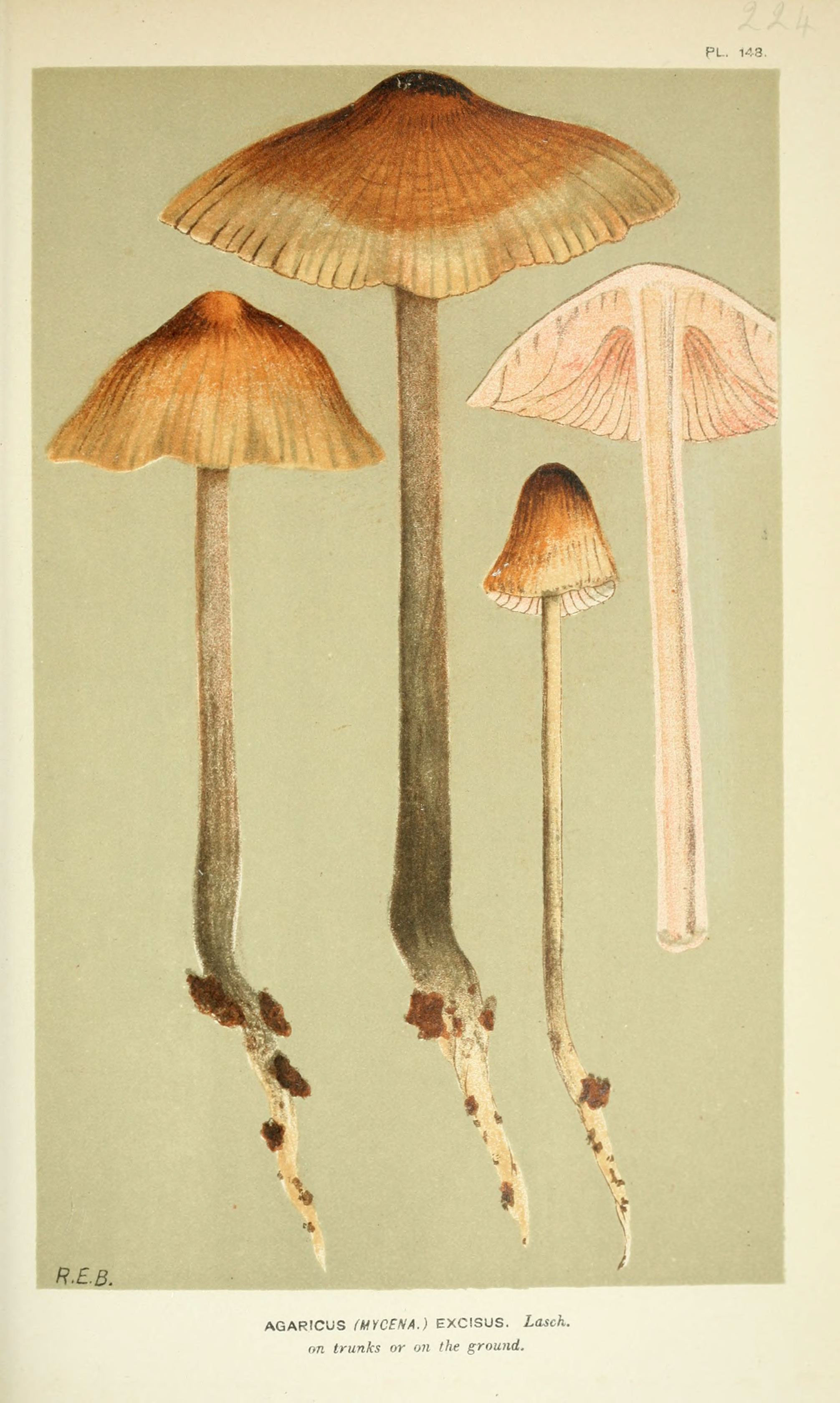
