= Wakerley and Barrowden railway station =

Former railway station in Northamptonshire, England

Coordinates: 52.5864°N 0.5908°W

Wakerley and Barrowden
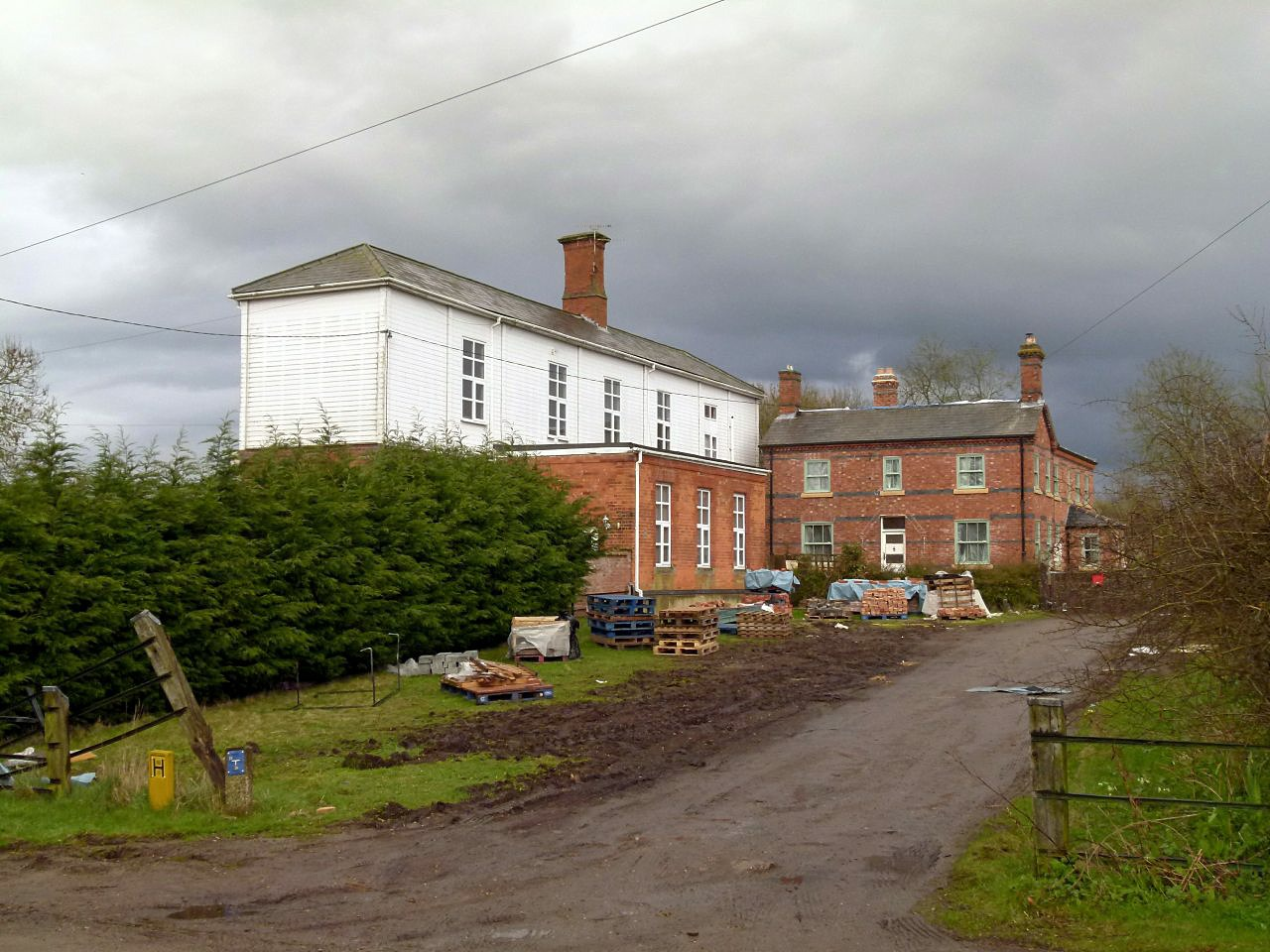
- Wakerley and Barrowden Station in 2016

General information
- Location: Wakerley, Northamptonshire; England
- Grid reference: SP956997
- Platforms: 2

Other information
- Status: Disused

History
- Pre-grouping: London and North Western Railway
- Post-grouping: London Midland and Scottish Railway

Key dates
- 1 November 1879: Opened
- 6 June 1966: Closed
Location

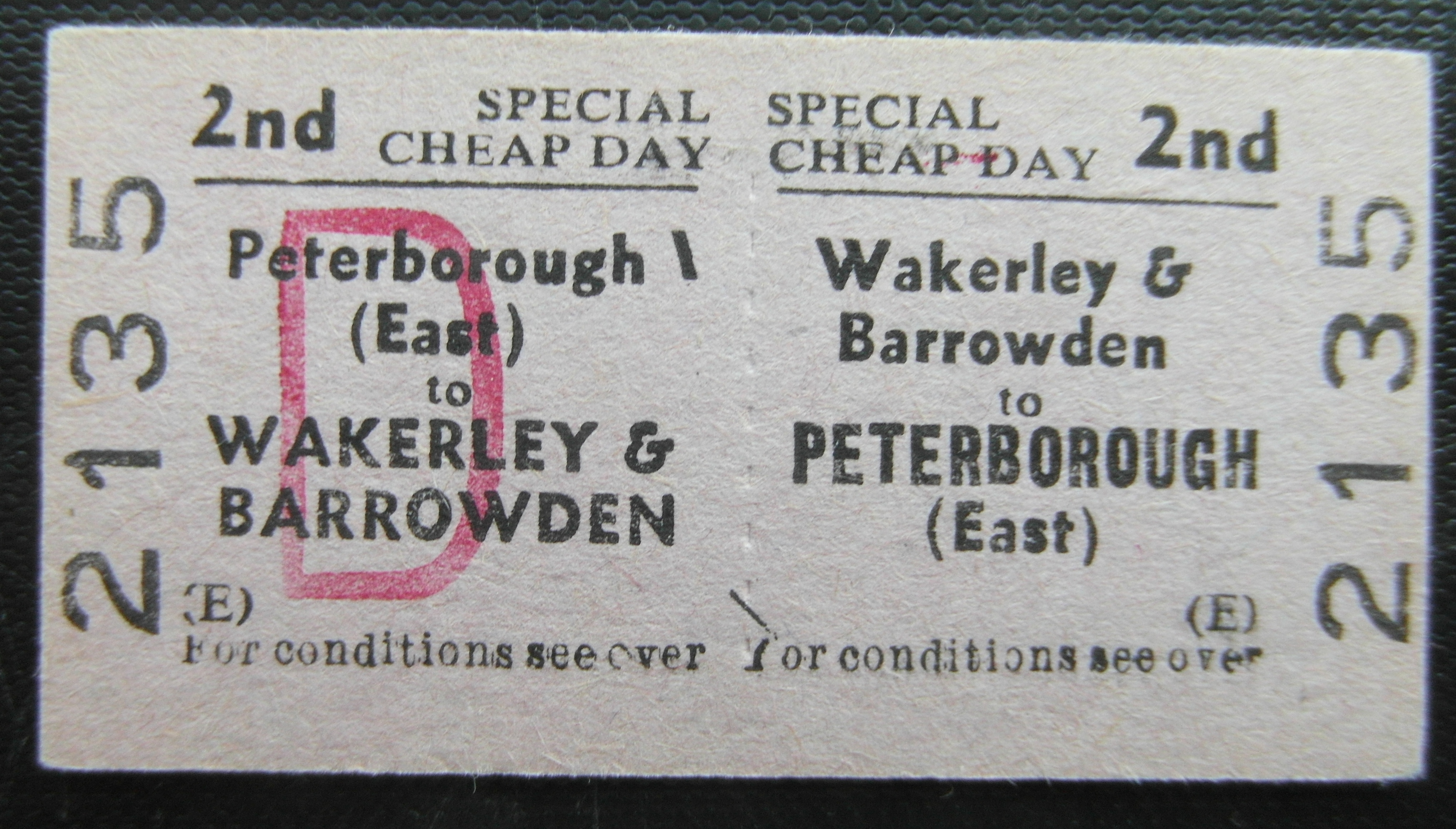
Ticket in use at the station at the time of its closure in 1966

Wakerley and Barrowden railway station is a former railway station in Wakerley, Northamptonshire, England which also served the nearby village of Barrowden, Rutland. It was owned by the London and North Western Railway but from 1883 to 1916 was also served by trains of the Great Northern Railway.

It opened for passengers on 1 November 1879 along with Kingscliffe railway station and Nassington railway station, on a new section of line from Wansford Line Junction at Seaton to Yarwell Junction at Wansford.

Wakerley and Barrowden station closed for goods traffic on 28 December 1964 and to passengers on 6 June 1966, when the passenger service from Rugby (Midland) to Peterborough (East) was withdrawn. At the same time the section of line from Rugby (Midland) to Kingscliffe was closed completely.

Preceding station	Disused railways	Following station
Seaton; Line and station closed	London and North Western Railway; Rugby to Peterborough East	King's Cliffe; Line and station closed
Seaton; Line and station closed	Great Northern Railway; Leicester Belgrave Road to Peterborough North	King's Cliffe; Line and station closed
