= List of rolling stock preserved on the North Norfolk Railway =

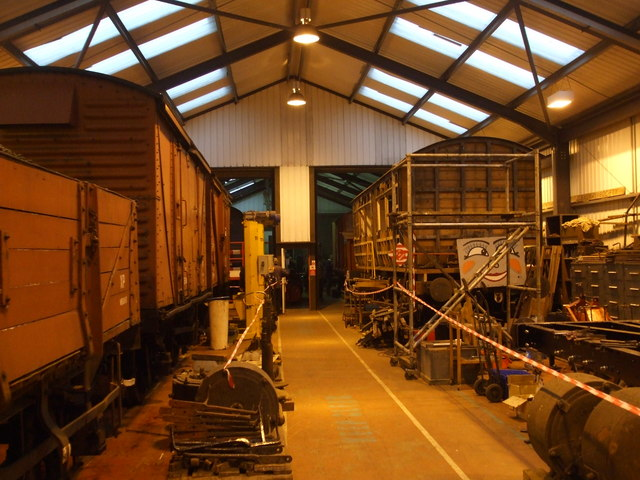
Most vehicles are maintained at Weybourne (pictured).

The North Norfolk Railway, a heritage line operating in Norfolk, England, has a large collection of heritage rolling stock, mostly relating to the London and North Eastern Railway (LNER) branch lines in Norfolk. The rolling stock preserved on the North Norfolk Railway is used to operate trains on the NNR, also known as the "Poppy Line", which runs between the coastal town of Sheringham and Holt. Some vehicles are also approved to operate over Network Rail, mostly in connection with dining services to Cromer.

There is a variety of preserved steam and diesel locomotives and diesel multiple units, passenger coaches and goods wagons. Some are owned by the railway itself but most are owned by individuals or voluntary groups. The line is also regularly visited by locomotives based elsewhere.

== Maintenance facilities ==
The main restoration sheds are at Weybourne. These have space to accommodate four standard length British Railways Mark 1 coaches and six large steam or diesel locomotives. Additional carriage storage sheds have been built near Holt, using Heritage Lottery Funding. These have the capacity to store the equivalent of 18 Mark 1 coaches.

Information about rolling stock available from: www.nnrailway.co.uk/rolling_stock/

== Steam locomotives ==
=== Operational ===
Number and name	Built for	Type	Livery	Mainline Certified	Owners	Notes	Image
1589 "Newstead"		Hunslet Engine Company 16-inch Saddle Tank; 0-6-0			Alex Alder	Built in 1929 and purchased by Kirby Featherstone and Hemsworth Collieries, subsequently in service with the National Coal Board at Woolley Colliery until 1971 or 1972; purchase by Malcolm Saul, light overhaul at Suffolk Steam followed by storage at a convent. After rediscovery after Saul's death in 2015, extensively overhauled and returned to service on 12 July 2025.	
1700 "Wissington"	British Sugar Corporation	Hudswell Clarke 0-6-0ST	Green	No	M&GN Joint Railway Society	Returned to service in June 2022 after overhaul. Returned to the North Norfolk Railway in March 2024.	
1744	Great Northern Railway	GNR Class N2 0-6-2T	GNR lined green	Pending	The Gresley Society	Built in 1921. Returned to service after overhaul in July 2026. To be mainline certified for use between Sheringham & Cromer	
90775 "The Royal Norfolk Regiment"	War Department	WD Austerity; 2-10-0	BR unlined black with early crest	No	M&GN Joint Railway Society	Operational, boiler ticket expires in 2027. Returned to service in May 2017 following the completion of its latest overhaul. The locomotive was named in September 2017, having previously carried the name "Sturdee" in preservation. Built in 1943. Not permitted to run on mainline due to flangeless middle wheels.	
80080	BR	BR Standard 4 2-6-4T	BR Lined Black with late crest	No	Princess Royal Class Locomotive Trust	Recently arrived at the railway as part of the home fleet for an initial period of five years.	

=== Undergoing Overhaul/Repairs/Stored ===
Number and name	Built for	Type	Livery	Mainline Certified	Owners	Notes	Image
564	Great Eastern Railway	Class Y14; 0-6-0	GER lined blue	No	M&GN Joint Railway Society	Returned to service in 2015 following overhaul. Built in 1912. Withdrawn in May 2024 after failing its annual boiler inspection.	
1982 "Ring Haw"	Nassington Quarry	Hunslet Engine Company 0-6-0ST	Lined green	No	M&GN Joint Railway Society	Built in 1940. Purchased by the M&GN Joint Railway Society in April 2020 in order to aid the North Norfolk Railway PLC financially and in order to secure the overhaul of the locomotive. Currently undergoing overhaul, boiler lifted Nov 2022.	
61572 (8572)	Great Eastern Railway	GER Class S69 4-6-0	LNER apple green	No	M&GN Joint Railway Society	Under Overhaul	
76084	BR	BR Standard Class 4 2-6-0	BR Lined Black	No	76084 Locomotive Company	Boiler ticket expired 24th Dec 2023. Overhaul started in July 2026 with boiler lifted.	76084 July 2023

=== Away on loan ===
Number and name	Built for	Type	Livery	Mainline Certified	Owners	Notes	Image
985	North Eastern Railway	LNER Class Y7; 0-4-0T	LNER black	No	North Norfolk Railway PLC	Undergoing overhaul, boiler at NNR weybourne and bottom end still at MSLR. On loan to the Mid Suffolk Light Railway. Built in 1923.	
92203 "Black Prince"	British Rail	Standard Class 9F; 2-10-0	BR black with late crest	No	North Norfolk Railway PLC	Returned to service in 2019 after major firebox repairs. Built in 1959. Sidelined in December 2023 with leaks in the main internal steam pipe and withdrawn in March 2024. Not permitted to run on mainline due to flangeless middle wheels. Currently on display at the Bressingham Steam Museum until space and the funds are available to overhaul the loco.	

=== Visiting Steam Locomotives ===
Number and name	Built for	Type	Livery	Mainline Certified	Owners	Notes	Image
4277 “Hercules”	Great Western Railway	GWR 4200 Class	Black	No	Dartmouth Steam Railway	On loan for the 2025 season.	
United Steel Company No.22	United Steel Company	Hunslet Austerity 0-6-0ST	United Steel Company Maroon	No	Private Owner - Theaker Joinery LTD	15 year loan to North Norfolk Railway	

== Diesel locomotives ==
=== Operational ===
Number and name	Built for	Type	Livery	Notes	Image
D5631	British Rail	Class 31	BR green with late crest	Returned to service in July 2021. Built in 1960. Steam heat boiler installed, awaiting commissioning.	
D3935	British Rail	Class 08	BR green with late crest	Built in 1961. Returned to service in 2018 following overhaul, purchased by the Midland & Great Northern Joint Railway Society in 2018. In use as the Weybourne yard pilot	
D3940	British Rail	Class 08	BR green with late crest	Built in 1960. Returned to service in 2022, purchased by the Midland & Great Northern Joint Railway Society in 2023, now in use as the Sheringham station pilot.	
D6732	British Rail	Class 37	British Rail crest and yellow warning panels	Built in 1962. Began operating on the North Norfolk Railway in 1996. Returned to service in 2013 following a major overhaul, but was withdrawn with an earth/generator fault in January 2017. Following extensive repairs, tyre turning and installation of a pre-heater unit at Barrow Hill, the locomotive returned to and re-entered service at the railway in April 2019. The locomotive underwent a full repaint by Heritage Painting at the start of 2022. The locomotive is also fitted with a pre-heater.	

=== Out of Traffic - Undergoing overhaul/repairs ===
Number and name	Built for	Type	Livery	Notes	Image
12131	British Rail	Class 11	Black	Out of traffic. Overhaul starting.	

=== Visiting Diesel Locomotives ===
Number and name	Built for	Type	Livery	Notes	Image

== Diesel multiple and single units ==
=== Operational ===
Number	Built for	Type	Livery	Notes	Image
E56352	BR	Class 101	BR Green	On loan from the NRM	
M56182	BR	Class 104	BR Green	Returned to service in September 2023 after 10-year overhaul. Privately owned and paired with M51188	
E51228	BR	Class 101	BR Green	Owned By the M&GN society	
M51188	BR	Class 101	BR Green	Owned by privately on loan from ecclesbourne valley railway	

=== Under Repair/Restoration ===
- BR Class 101 51192. Engines removed and currently stored in Bridge Road Carriage Sheds. On loan from the National Railway Museum.
- BR Class 101 56062. Undergoing bodywork overhaul in 2023, BR Green, Built in 1957.
- BR Class 104 50479. Undergoing major restoration, BR Green, Built in 1958. Privately owned

=== Away on loan ===
- BR Waggon- und Maschinenbau GmbH Donauwörth railbus 79960, built 1958, on loan to the Ribble Steam Railway

== On-track plant ==
- TRAMM – DR 98801 ex-Balfour Beatty Track Renewal & Maintenance Machine (operational)

== Coaching stock ==
=== BR Mark 1 carriages ===
==== Operational ====
Number	Built for	Type	Notes	Image
E1969	British Railways	Mk1 RBR	Crimson & Cream – Used in Dining Trains/Murder Mystery. Normally visible on Platform 3 of Sheringham station	
M3116	British Railways	Mk1 FO	Crimson & Cream – Used in Dining Trains/Murder Mystery. Normally visible on Platform 3 of Sheringham station	
E3868	British Railways	Mk1 TSO	Crimson & Cream. The first Mk 1 coach preserved when purchased in 1969.	
E4236	British Railways	Mk1 TSO	Maroon - Received intermediate overhaul in 2017	
E4372	British Railways	Mk1 SO	Crimson & Cream – Used in Dining Trains/Murder Mystery. Normally visible on Platform 3 of Sheringham station	
E4641	British Railways	Mk1 TSO	Crimson & Cream - Major overhaul completed in 2016. Used as spare dining train coach.	
E4843	British Railways	Mk1 TSO	Maroon - Overhauled in 2019	
M4958	British Railways	Mk1 TSO	Maroon - Has operational toilets. Overhauled in 2014, reupholstered in 2022	
E21103	British Railways	Mk1 BCK	Maroon – Luggage area specially adapted for wheelchairs Underwent an intermediate overhaul between 2021 & 2022	
W25189	British Railways	Mk1 SK	Chocolate and Cream - Former Cambrian Coast Express 'Auto Buffet'	
M81033	British Railways	Mk1 BG(K)	Crimson & Cream – Mobile kitchen vehicle for Dining Trains/Murder Mystery. Normally visible on Platform 3 of Sheringham station. The vehicle is now in its final years of operation. It has had air conditioning fitted.	
E21224	British Railways	Mk1 BCK	Crimson & Cream - Returned to traffic in 2021 after an extensive overhaul. Is dual braked (vacuum & air) and is fitted with a CET (Controlled Emissions Toilet) system for the lavatory	

==== Non-Operational/ In Works ====
Number	Built for	Type	Notes	Image
3984	British Railways	Mk1 TSO	Crimson – Static exhibition at Holt for the suburban 4 project.	
M15997	British Railways	Mk1 CK	Blue - Stored out of service in very poor condition.	
E4521	British Railways	Mk1 TSO	Maroon - Overhaul started but stopped due to lockdowns.	
M81114	British Railways	Mk1 BG	Green – Not in public use, used as storage.	
E4651	British Railways	Mk1 TSO	Maroon- Toilets removed to provide luggage storage. Taken out of traffic in 2020 due to deteriorating condition. Roof is leaking.	
M26012	British Railways	Mk1 SK	Maroon- Taken out of traffic in 2020 due to deteriorating condition.	
W35148	British Railways	MK1 BSK	Taken out of traffic at the end of 2022 for an intermediate overhaul.	
E4667	British Railways	Mk1 TSO	Green- Now in static use as undercover seating at Holt station. Will return to service in future years. This vehicle has gained the informal nickname of "The Tiger Coach" as it was once used in a circus train to transport live tigers.	
M81269	British Railways	Mk1 BG	Green – Not in public use, used as storage.	

=== BR Mark 3 carriages ===
Number	Built for	Type	Notes	Image
10525	British Railways	Mk3a SLEP	Maroon livery. Built 1982. Static use only as luxury volunteer sleeping accommodation. Replacing now-scrapped 1952-built LMS Third Sleeper 624.	

=== Specialist carriages ===
Number	Built for	Type	Notes	Image
524	Great Eastern Railway	Second	Body of 1899-built four-wheel, 5 compartment coach. Formerly part of private residence near Reepham. Now restored as a museum display residence at Holt Station.	

=== Suburban coaches ===
Part of the Suburban 4 project, funded by a £99,500 from the Heritage Lottery Fund, to restore four of these coaches together to complement the vintage Quad Art set which they replaced in the 1950s.

Number	Built for	Type	Notes	Image
E43041	British Railways	Mk1 CL	Crimson – in service. Built in 1954.	
E43357	British Railways	Mk1 BT	Crimson – in service. Built in 1955. Previously modified as generator coach for dining services, but since restored to original condition.	
E46139	British Railways	Mk1 T	Crimson – in service. Built in 1954.	
E48001	British Railways	Mk1 TLO	Crimson – in service. Built in 1955.	

=== "Quad Art" coaches ===
Short for "Quad-Articulated", this unique set of permanently coupled coaches have been overhauled and restored in LNER varnished teak condition. Used as the backbone of NNR services until 1979, due to the age and historical importance of these coaches they are now only used periodically throughout the year. They were restored using a match funded Heritage Lottery grant of £341,000, with an additional £308,000 grant from the Heritage Lottery Fund providing the Bridge Road Carriage Sheds, which were built to store the Quad-Art set.

Number	Built for	Type	Notes	Image
48861	LNER	Brake Third (BT)	Teak - in service. Built in 1924.	
48862	LNER	Third (T)	Teak - in service. Built in 1924.	
48863	LNER	Third (T)	Teak - in service. Built in 1924.	
48864	LNER	Third (T)	Teak - in service. Built in 1924.	

=== "Mainline Set" Coaches ===
These LNER carriages are, or will be, restored externally to British Railways 1950's/60's condition in Crimson/Cream livery.

Number	Built for	Type	Notes	Image
E9128E	LNER	Gresley Buffet (RB)	Previously restored in LNER varnished teak, but now Crimson/Cream – Built at York 1937. in service, usually used with the MK1s.	
70621	LNER	Brake Gangwayed (BG)	Built at York 1945. Formerly museum coach at Sheringham. Stored, out of service.	
52256	LNER	Tourist Third Open (TTO)	Built at York 1935. Stored, out of service.	
E12493E	LNER	Third Corridor (TK)	Built by Metro Cammell 1931. Static use, activity coach at Sheringham station	
E1866	LNER	Brake Third Corridor (BTK)	Built at Doncaster Works, 1950. In works.	
295	GER	Brake Third Corridor (BTK)	Built at Stratford 1907 for Norfolk Coast Express. Previously used on NNR as volunteer dormitory coach. Stored, out of service. Will be restored in varnished teak and work with the Quad Arts or Vintage Set and will provide Disabled access to both.	

=== "Vintage Set" Coaches ===
These carriages are or will be restored to form a rake of Victorian 4 or 6 Wheeler Carriages.

Number	Built for	Type	Notes	Image
6843	LNER	Pigeon Van (BYP)	Built at York 1929 for the Great Eastern/Midland and Great Northern section. Previously in static use as a shop at Weybourne. Lined teak, operational. Used either as part of the vintage train or attached to the Quad-Arts Set.	
853	GER	BTY	Built in 1899. In service after restoration was completed in 2019. Converted to allow Disabled Access	
129	GNR/M&GN	TZ	Built at Doncaster 1887, becoming Midland & Great Northern Joint Railway stock in 1903. In service, part of the vintage train. Initially restored using a converted wagon chassis, a new, more authentic, six-wheeled underframe has now been fitted.	
3	MR/M&GN	TY	Built in at Derby 1886 as Picnic Saloon 1616. To M&GN in 1903 as No. 3. Restoration completed in October 2015. Part of the vintage train. Painted in lined maroon.	
7	GER	Bogie Tramcar	Built in 1884 for the Wisbech and Upwell Tramway. In service, part of the vintage train. Only surviving Rolling Stock of the Wisbech and Upwell Tramway.	

=== Passenger rated vans ===
These vans are usually coupled to the railway's regular passenger trains. Their purpose is to carry pushcarts and bicycles for passengers.

Number	Livery	Built for	Type	Notes	Image
92097	Unlined Crimson/GWR Chocolate with Shirtbutton	British Railways	Fruit D	Built in 1958. In service. Received repairs and a repaint in 2015.	
94125	Unlined Maroon	British Railways	CCT (Covered Carriage Truck)	Built in 1958. Now stored out of service due to deteriorating condition. It will not be returning to service on the NNR.	
94464	Lined Maroon	British Railways	CCT (Covered Carriage Truck)	Built in 1960. In service. Overhaul completed in 2018.	
94338	BR Blue	British Railways	CCT (Covered Carriage Truck)	Built in 1960. Awaiting Overhaul. Recently transferred from Embsay and Bolton Abbey Steam Railway	

=== Brake vans ===
Number	Built for	Notes	Image
DB993707	British Rail	16T, hand brake, operational. Built 1951 RY Pickering. Arrived NNR in 2019.	
B950133	British Rail	20T, vacuum brake, undergoing repaint/repairs in 2023. Built in 1949.	
55167	Southern Railway	25T, hand brake, operational, overhauled 2021/22. Built at Ashford works.	
12	Lynn and Fakenham Railway	Operational. Occasional use only, normally part of the William Marriot Museum. Used in Melton Constable breakdown train and built in 1887.	

== Goods wagons ==
The North Norfolk Railway also operate a number of goods vehicles. These are classified as either 'operational' for use in engineering trains, 'heritage' which are suitable for use in a demonstration heritage freight train that is used on special occasions, or 'museum' if only allowed to run short distances.

== Former North Norfolk Railway rolling stock ==
Since the preservation reopening of the line, several items of rolling stock have worked or been based on the North Norfolk Railway, but have since departed. A number of vehicles have also been stripped and partially (or fully) scrapped on the railway.

=== Steam locomotives and shunters previously based on the NNR ===
Number & Name	Description	Notes	Picture
1970 "John D. Hammer"	Peckett 0-6-0 saddle tank locomotive	Built in 1939 as works number 1970 for the Ashington Coal Company in Northumberland. Arrived on NNR in 1969, and was sold in 1991. It is now "Jackie Milburn 1924-1988" at the Stephenson Railway Museum.	
3777	Hunslet 0-6-0 saddle tank locomotive	Built in 1952 for the National Coal Board (NCB) by the Hunslet Engine Company. Operated as 68030 at NNR. Now Llangollen Railway.	
3809	Hunslet 0-6-0 saddle tank locomotive	Built in 1954 for the National Coal Board (NCB) by the Hunslet Engine Company. In 1963 it was fitted with a Giesl ejector chimney and blast-pipe. Moved to the NNR in 1988, and sold to the Weardale Railway in 2006.	
5470 "Colwyn"	Kitson 0-6-0 saddle tank locomotive	Built in 1933 for Stewarts and Lloyds to work at the quarry at Corby. Arrived on NNR in 1971, starring in an episode of Dad's Army in 1973. It was sold in 1985 and is now at the Northampton & Lamport Railway.	
2107 "Harlaxton"	Andrew Barclay 0-6-0 side tank locomotive	Built in 1941 for Stewart & Lloyds, who operated the steelworks at Corby and the ironstone quarries nearby at Harlaxton and Woolsthorpe. It spent several years operating in M&GN livery on the NNR, and is now at the Caledonian Railway as "Thomas".	
7765	Robert Stephenson & Hawthorne 0-6-0 side tank locomotive	Built in 1954 by Robert Stephenson & Hawthorn for the National Coal Board (NCB), specifically for working passenger trains on the NCB system at Ashington in Northumberland. It operated on the NNR in the 1970s, moving to the Colne Valley Railway and is now on the Weardale Railway.	
7845	Robert Stephenson & Hawthorne 0-6-0 side tank locomotive	Built to work at Hams Hall Power Station at Sutton Coalfield, where it was No 12. It was displayed at Sheringham on the NNR until the 1990s, moving briefly to County School railway station and is now displayed at the Hawes railway station in BR livery.	
2680	WG Bagnall 0-6-0 saddle tank locomotive	Built in 1942 the Birchenwood Gas and Coke Co works near Stoke-on-Trent. It arrived in the 1970s, and was taken apart for an overhaul that was never completed, with Weybourne shed being built around it. It departed in 2009 and is now operational at the Ribble Steam Railway.	
2918 "Pony"	Hawthorne Leslie 0-4-0 saddle tank locomotive	Built in 1912 for Blyth Harbour Commission. It arrived from the Yorkshire Dales Railway, and was briefly used as a station pilot. It departed in the 1990s, initially to County School railway station, and is now in works at Tyseley.	
2168 "Edmundsons"	Andrew Barclay 0-4-0 saddle tank locomotive	Built in 1943 and spent its working life at Little Barford Power Station in Bedfordshire. It was briefly used on the NNR but departed in the 1990s, initially to County School railway station, and is now in works at the Rushden Transport Museum.	
2370	Bagnall 0-6-0 fireless locomotive	Built for the Distillers Company and delivered to their Salt End Works, Kingston upon Hull, in May 1929. It arrived in late 1979, and went on static display at Sheringham before moving circa 2004. Now derelict alongside the Leicester-Birmingham railway line.	
13809	Somerset and Dorset Joint Railway Class 7F; 2-8-0	Built in 1925 as number 89 for the S&D. Arrived 2018 for 6 months later being extended until the boiler ticket expired, being in 2026 where its owner (john moorhouse and the 13809 preservation society) returned it to midland railway centre butterley for overhaul.	

=== Diesel locomotives and shunters previously based on the NNR ===
Number & Name	Description	Notes	Picture
4100001 'Doctor Harry'	John Fowler 0-4-0 diesel	Built 1945, formerly used at King's Lynn, beside the M&GN at South Lynn. Used to help restore the line to use, but scrapped in 1982.	
4210080	John Fowler 0-4-0 diesel	Built 1953, preserved on the NNR, but scrapped in 1991.	
466629	Ruston & Hornsby 0-4-0 diesel	Informally named 'TIPOCKITY'. Went to Swanage, then Shillingstone, before being donated to the Whitwell & Reepham railway. Now operational at Whitwell & Reepham railway station.	
NCB 10	English Electric 0-4-0 diesel	Built 1961, a diesel hydraulic with a Dorman engine, for the National Coal Board. Preserved 1976.	
D2267	British Rail Class 04 0-6-0	Withdrawn in 1971, it was preserved, after an industrial career, in 1998. Stored on the NNR, and scrapped at Weybourne in 2003.	
D2280	British Rail Class 04 0-6-0	Stored on the NNR for several years and owned by the M&GNJRS, but sold and now based on the Gloucestershire Warwickshire Railway.	
25057	British Rail Class 25 Bo-Bo	Arrived on the North Norfolk in April 1991, then to Harry Needle Railroad Company.	
27066 'Holt Pioneer'	British Rail Class 27 Bo-Bo	On 30 June 1962, this locomotive collided with a diesel multiple unit at Cricklewood carriage sidings, London due to confusion over a hand signal. The engine is now preserved and stored at Barrow Hill Roundhouse.	
37099	British Rail Class 37 Co-Co	Arrived from the Mid-Norfolk Railway, and stored until relocated to the Gloucestershire Warwickshire Railway.	
D2063	BR Class 03, built 1959	Left the NNR after the passing of its owner.	
D 2051	BR class 03	Left the NNR November 2023. Now at the Telford Steam Railway	D2051 Leaving the NNR

=== Diesel multiple and single units previously based on the NNR ===
Number & Name	Description	Notes	Picture
79963	Waggon- und Maschinenbau GmbH Donauwörth railbus	Preserved 1967, along with sister 79960. Operated on NNR until 2003, and sold to East Anglian Railway Museum in 2012.	
51346 + 59516 + 51388	BR Class 117	This three car Class 117 was privately preserved in 1994, and operated on the North Norfolk Railway until 2003. Power cars then to Eastleigh Works for failed plan to return to the main line. Only 51388 still survives.	
BR 975874	LEV 1	This single car experimental passenger vehicle, owned by the National Railway Museum, is a prototype for the later Pacers, and periodically operated on the NNR from 2004 to 2012.	

=== Carriages previously based on the NNR ===
Number	Built for	Type	Designation	Notes
16	Great Eastern Railway	4 wheel	First	Built 1878. Used after withdrawal at Hevingham before moving to NNR. Stored at Weybourne and used for storage until scrapped in 2003.
523	Great Eastern Railway	4 wheel	Second	Built 1899. Withdrawn 1929, with body used as cafe in Acle. Moved to NNR and used as workshop at Sheringham, but scrapped in 2013.
769	Great Eastern Railway	6 wheel	Third	Built 1889. Moved to NNR in 2000 and stored at Holt, until sold for non-railway use in 2002.
969	Great Eastern Railway	6 wheel	Third	Built 1887. Arrived 1990 and used as Store in Weybourne Yard until sold to private owner by 2002 and moved to Melton, Suffolk.
1361	Great Eastern Railway	6 wheel	Third	Built 1892. Arrived in 1990 and used as station building at Holt Station. Disposed of in 2002 to a site near Raynham Park railway station.
1367	Great Eastern Railway	6 wheel	Second	Built 1892. Withdrawn 1925. Moved to NNR and stored at Sheringham and then on carriage underframe, until sold and scrapped in 2008.
1521	Great Eastern Railway	6 wheel	Third	Built 1894. Withdrawn 1928. Moved to NNR and stored at Sheringham, until scrapped in 1998.
1	Lancashire & Yorkshire Railway	4w bogie	Director's Saloon	Built 1906. Preserved 1968, and used as diesel workshop storage until 1999 when it was sold to a private owner at Embsay and Bolton Abbey Steam Railway.
5318	London & North Western Railway	6w bogie	Director's Saloon	Built 1913. Preserved 1969, and used as static buffet at Sheringham until condition forced withdrawal. Sold 2003 to a private owner at Embsay and Bolton Abbey Steam Railway.
624	London Midland and Scottish Railway	4w bogie	Sleeper Third	Built 1952. Preserved 1976 and moved to NNR as volunteer accommodation at Sheringham, until scrapped in 1997.
287	Southern Railway	4w bogie	Pullman Third	Built for Brighton Belle in 1932. Preserved 1981 and moved to NNR, and used on luxury dining trains until 2000. Sold to '5BEL Trust' in 2009.
291	Southern Railway	4w bogie	Pullman Third	Driving brake Pullman Parlour Brake built 1932 for the Brighton Belle. Preserved 1981 and moved to NNR, and used on luxury dining trains until 2000. Sold to 5Bel Trust in 2009.
34495	British Railways	Mk1	BSK	Built 1954. Grounded for use as store at Weybourne, until scrapped in 2015.
35341	British Railways	Mk1	BSK	Built 1962. Donated to North Norfolk by Courier Rail, from Norwich Crown Point, 2003. Sold to private owner and moved to Mid-Norfolk Railway in 2017
4615	British Railways	Mk1	TSO	Built 1957. Scrapped in 2006.
43034	British Railways	Mk1	CL	Built 1955. Preserved 1975. Used on NNR services, but sold in 2010, moving to the Epping Ongar Railway. Now at Llangollen Railway.
48026	British Railways	Mk1	SLO	Built 1955. Preserved 1975. Used on NNR services, but then scrapped in 1989.
46147	British Railways	Mk1	S	Built 1954. Preserved by NNR in 1978. Used on NNR services, but then sold, out of use, to Epping Ongar Railway in 2011. Now at Llangollen Railway.
53170	British Railways	Mk1	BS	Built 1955. Preserved by NNR in 1978. Used on NNR services, but then sold, out of use, to Epping Ongar Railway in 2011. Now at Llangollen Railway.
81243	British Railways	Mk1	BG	Built 1957. Arrived on NNR in 2005, and scrapped for spares.
81562	British Railways	Mk1	BG	Built 1957. Arrived on NNR in 2003, and scrapped for spares in 2005.
