= Miles Joseph Berkeley =

British botanist (1803–1889)

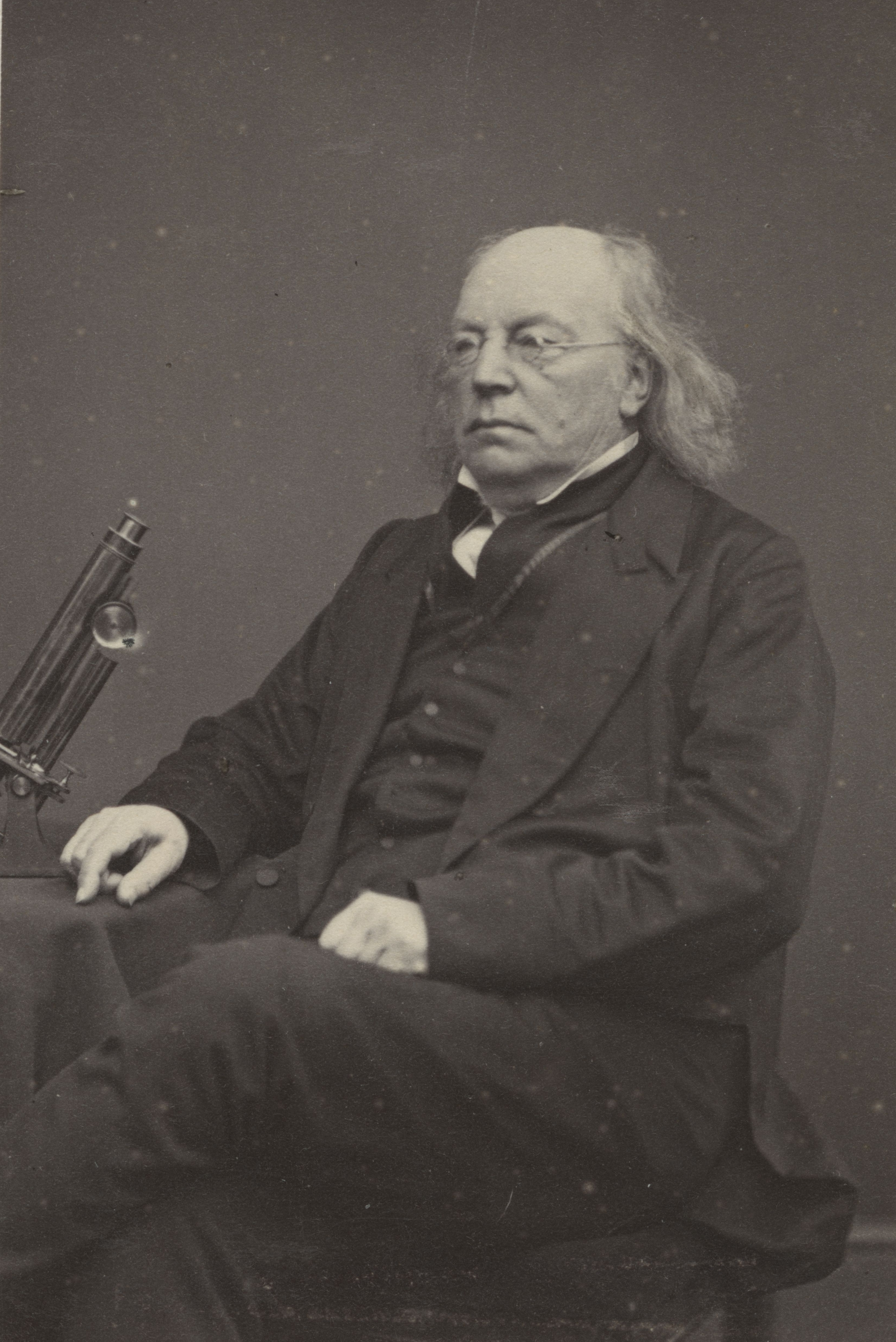
- Carte-de-visite, c. 1866
- Born: 1 April 1803
- Died: 30 July 1889 (aged 86)
- Occupation: vicar
- Known for: Outlines of British Fungology
- Awards: Royal Medal (1863)

Miles Joseph Berkeley (1 April 1803 – 30 July 1889) was an English cryptogamist and clergyman, and one of the founders of the science of plant pathology. The standard author abbreviation Berk. is used to indicate this person as the author when citing a botanical name.

== Life ==
Berkeley was born at Biggin Hall, Benefield, Northamptonshire, and educated at Rugby School and Christ's College, Cambridge. Taking holy orders, he became incumbent of Apethorpe in 1837, and vicar of Sibbertoft, near Market Harborough, in 1868. He acquired an enthusiastic love of cryptogamic botany (lichens) in his early years, and soon was recognized as the leading British authority on fungi and plant pathology. Christ's College made him an honorary fellow in 1883.

He was well known as a systematist in mycology with some 6000 species of fungi being credited to him, but his Introduction to Cryptogamic Botany, published in 1857, and his papers on Vegetable Pathology in the Gardener's Chronicle in 1854 and onwards, show that he had a broad grasp of the whole domain of physiology and morphology as understood in those days. Berkeley began his work as a field naturalist and collector, his earliest objects of study having been the mollusca and other branches of zoology, as testified by his papers in the Zoological Journal and the Magazine of Natural History, between 1828 and 1836.

He was a member of the founding council of the Ray Society.

As a microscopist he was an assiduous and accurate worker, as shown by his numerous drawings of the smaller algae and fungi, and his admirable dissections of mosses and Hepaticae. His investigations on the potato murrain, caused by Phytophthora infestans, on the grape powdery mildew, to which he gave the name Oidium tuckeri, and on the pathogenic fungi of wheat rust, hop mildew, and various diseases of cabbage, pears, coffee, onions, tomatoes, and other plants, were important in results bearing on the life-history of these pests, at a time when very little was known of such matters, and must always be considered in any historical account of the remarkable advances in the biology of these organisms made between 1850 and 1880. When it is remembered that this work was done without any of the modern appliances or training of a properly equipped laboratory, the real significance of Berkeley's pioneering work becomes apparent. It has been said that

"... when the history of Plant Pathology is elaborated, Berkeley's name will undoubtedly stand out more prominently than that of any other individual. In fact, it is not saying too much to pronounce Berkeley as the originator and founder of Plant Pathology."

As the founder of British mycology, his significant work is contained in the account of native British fungi in Sir William Jackson Hooker's British Flora (1836), in his Introduction to Cryptogamic Botany (1857), and in his Outlines of British Fungology (1860). His herbarium at the Royal Botanic Gardens, Kew, is one of the world's most extensive, containing over 9000 specimens as well as numerous notes and sketches. Between 1836 and 1843 Berkeley issued the exsiccata British fungi... Berkeley was one of the most prolific authors of new fungal species, having formally described about 5300 in his career.

Berkeley corresponded with Anna Maria Hussey assisting her with identifying specimens while she supplied specimens she had collected to add to his herbarium.

In 1857, Miles Joseph Berkeley was elected as member of the German Academy of Sciences Leopoldina.

In June, 1879 he was elected a Fellow of the Royal Society and was awarded their Royal Medal in 1863.

He died at his vicarage, Sibbertoft, near Market Harborough, on 30 July 1889.

He is honoured in the naming of Berkleasmium, which is a genus of fungi belonging to the family Dematiaceae. He was also honoured in 1871, when English botanist and mycologist Mordecai Cubitt Cooke examined a genus of pathogenic fungus and named them as Sarcostroma, with the type species named as Sarcostroma berkeleyi Cooke.

== Family ==
Berkeley married Cecilia Emma (née Campbell) and was the father of the scientific illustrator Ruth Ellen Berkeley and named Agaricus ruthae (now known as Pleurotus ruthae) for her.

== See also ==
- List of mycologists
