= Nassington railway station =

Former railway station in Northamptonshire, England

Coordinates: 52.5575°N 0.4268°W

Nassington
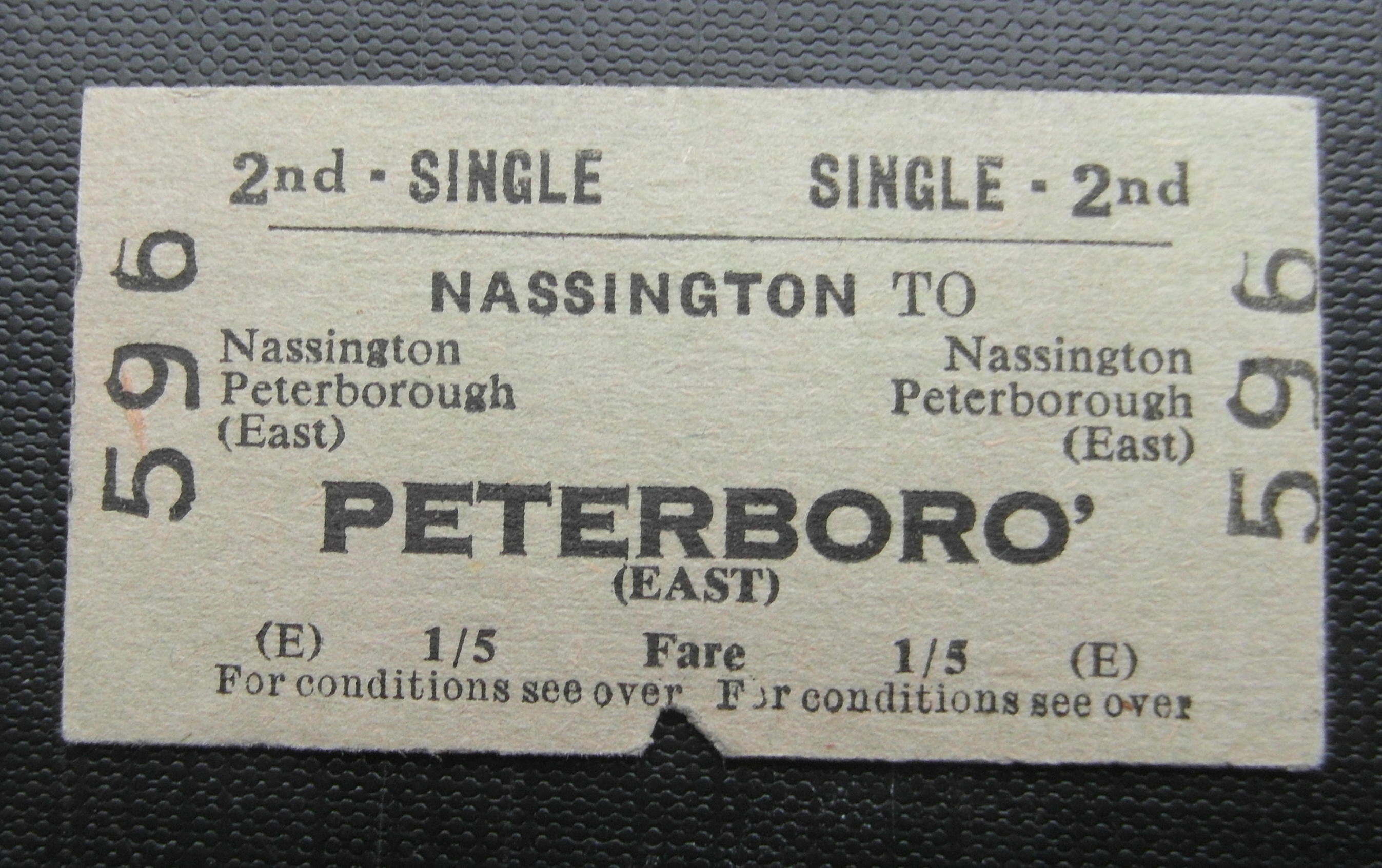
- Ticket in use at the station at the time of its closure in 1957

General information
- Location: Nassington, Northamptonshire; England
- Grid reference: TL067967
- Platforms: 2

Other information
- Status: Disused

History
- Pre-grouping: London and North Western Railway
- Post-grouping: London Midland and Scottish Railway

Key dates
- 1 November 1879: Opened
- 1 July 1957: Closed to passengers
- 3 August 1957: Closed to goods
- 26 February 1971: Closure of quarry siding and final closure of the railway
Location

Nassington railway station is a former railway station in Nassington, Northamptonshire. It was owned by the London and North Western Railway but from 1883 to 1916 was also served by trains of the Great Northern Railway. It opened for passengers along with Wakerley and Barrowden railway station and King's Cliffe railway station on 1 November 1879, on a new section of line constructed from Wansford Line Junction at Seaton to Yarwell Junction at Wansford.

Nassington station closed to passengers on 1 July 1957, (at the same time as Wansford railway station and Castor railway station, the next two stations east towards Peterborough), and to goods on 3 August 1957. The line remained open until the withdrawal of the passenger service from Rugby (Midland) to Peterborough (East) on 6 June 1966. On that date the section from Rugby (Midland) to King's Cliffe was closed completely, but the line east of King's Cliffe station remained open for goods traffic. On 3 June 1968 King's Cliffe station was closed to goods along with the track as far as the junction with a private siding into the ironstone quarries owned by Naylor Benzon 1 kilometre (0.62 mi) west of Nassington station. The last train to the quarry ran on 4 January 1971, and the siding and railway at Nassington finally closed on 26 February 1971.

Former services

Preceding station	Disused railways	Following station
King's Cliffe	London and North Western Railway; Rugby to Peterborough East	Wansford
King's Cliffe	Great Northern Railway; Leicester Belgrave Road to Peterborough North	Wansford
