= Welford and Kilworth railway station =

Former railway station in Leicestershire, England

Coordinates: 52.4468°N 1.0827°W

Welford and Kilworth
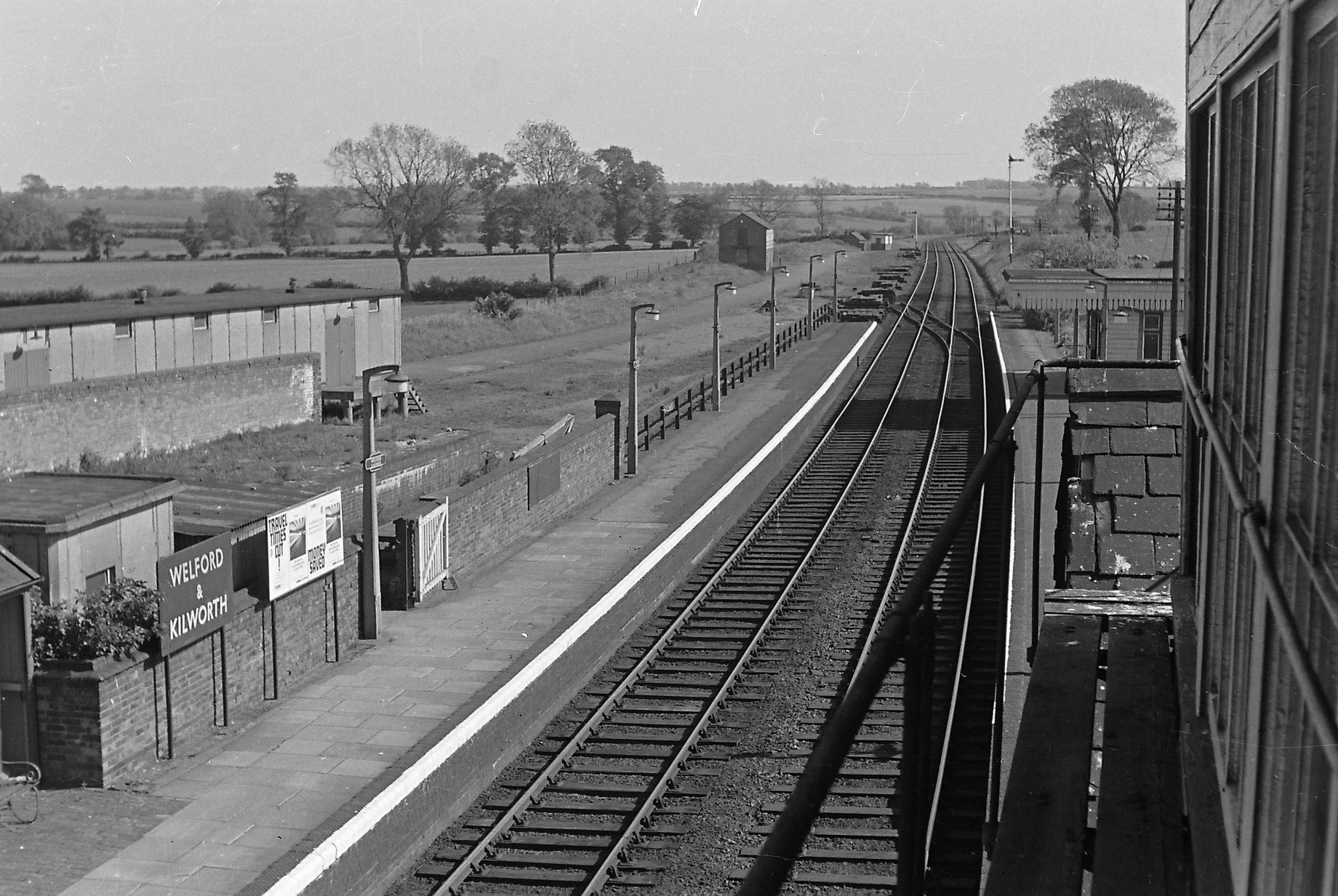

General information
- Location: North Kilworth, Leicestershire; England
- Platforms: 2

Other information
- Status: Disused

History
- Original company: London and North Western Railway
- Post-grouping: London, Midland and Scottish Railway

Key dates
- 1 May 1850: Station opens as Welford
- May 1853: renamed Welford, Kilworth
- April 1855: renamed Welford and Kilworth
- 1 May 1897: renamed Welford and Lutterworth
- 13 January 1913: renamed Welford and Kilworth
- 6 Jun 1966: Station closed
Location

Welford and Kilworth railway station was a railway station serving Welford and the villages of North Kilworth and South Kilworth in Leicestershire, England. It was opened as Welford on the Rugby and Stamford Railway in 1850.

Parliamentary approval was gained in 1846 by the directors of the London and Birmingham Railway for a branch from Rugby to the Syston and Peterborough Railway near Stamford. In the same year the company became part of the London and North Western Railway. The section from Rugby to Market Harborough, which included Welford, opened in 1850. Originally single track, it was doubled at the end of 1878.

Originally the plan had been to build a station at Husbands Bosworth but due to objections it was situated a couple of miles westward near the village of North Kilworth. Originally, the station was named "Welford" after the larger village of that name two and a half miles further south. Later the name "Lutterworth" was added in an attempt to attract custom from that town even though it was some six miles from the station.

The original station was built - as was normal at that time - at ground level. Later, when a platform was added the building's windowsill facing the platform was at ankle level. This original building was of brick, but a variety of additions and extensions in different materials and styles were added over the years.

A cottage was built on the opposite side of the line near to the road crossing and the box. Consequently, the signal box had to be high enough to give a view over it. There were two sidings on the up side behind the station building, with a loading dock and goods shed, and, in the opposite direction, beside the up line there were two long sidings. On the other side of the road crossing towards Stamford a further siding catered for a dairy. A milk train would arrive from Rugby at about 3.30 in the morning, returning empty at 5.00 a.m. Welford also proved handy for parking defective wagons.

At grouping in 1923 it became part of the London Midland and Scottish Railway. The station was closed on the sixth of June 1966 and all trackwork lifted shortly afterwards. Although the main station buildings were demolished, the 1878 built down platform shelter is preserved at the Electric Railway Museum, Warwickshire. There is still a Station Road and the trackbed can still be traced crossing the A4304 road.

Preceding station	Disused railways	Following station
Yelvertoft and Stanford Park; Line and station closed	London and North Western Railway; Rugby to Peterborough Line	Theddingworth; Line and station closed
