= Kilworth (disambiguation) =

Kilworth is a village in County Cork, Ireland.

Kilworth may also refer to:

- Kilworth Heights, Ontario, Canada, a township
- North Kilworth, Leicestershire, England, a village
  - location of Kilworth House
- South Kilworth, Leicestershire, England, a village

== See also ==
- Garry Kilworth, novelist
