= Lilbourne railway station =

Former railway station in Northamptonshire, England

Lilbourne
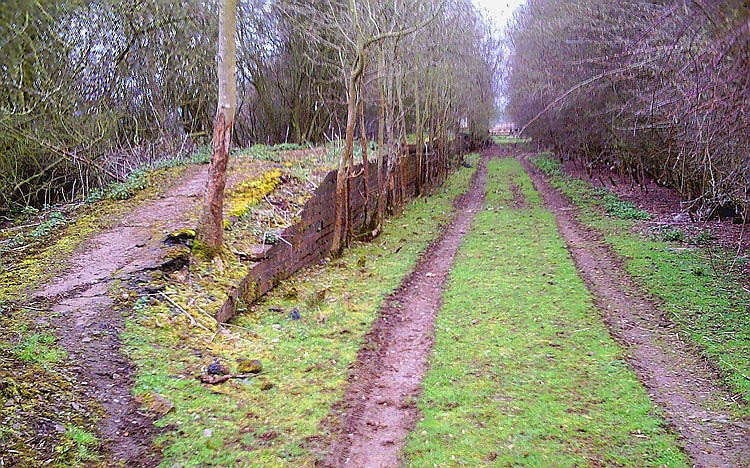
- Lilbourne station in 2004

General information
- Location: Lilbourne, West Northamptonshire; England
- Coordinates: 52.3954°N 1.1760°W
- Grid reference: SP5677
- Platforms: 2

Other information
- Status: Disused

History
- Original company: London and Birmingham Railway
- Pre-grouping: London and North Western Railway
- Post-grouping: London, Midland and Scottish Railway

Key dates
- 1 May 1850: Station opened
- 1878: track doubled
- 6 June 1966: Station closed
Location

Lilbourne railway station was a railway station serving Lilbourne and nearby Catthorpe in Northamptonshire, England. It was on the Rugby and Stamford Railway between Clifton Mill and Yelvertoft and Stanford Park.

In 1846, the directors of the London and Birmingham Railway gained powers in the Rugby and Stamford Railway Act 1846 (9 & 10 Vict. c. lxvii) for a branch from Rugby to the Syston and Peterborough Railway near Stamford. In the same year the company became part of the London and North Western Railway. The section from Rugby via Lilbourne to Market Harborough was opened in 1850. The line through Lilbourne was single track until it was doubled at the end of 1878.

The 1923 grouping made the LNWR part of the London Midland and Scottish Railway.

British Railways closed the station in 1966. All that remains is the trackbed and a platform.

| Preceding station | Disused railways | Following station |
|---|---|---|
| Clifton Mill; Line and station closed | London and North Western Railway; Rugby and Stamford Railway | Yelvertoft and Stanford Park; Line and station closed |
