= Lubenham railway station =

Former railway station in Leicestershire, England

Coordinates: 52.4774°N 0.9714°W

Lubenham

General information
- Location: Lubenham, Leicestershire; England
- Platforms: 2

Other information
- Status: Disused

History
- Original company: London and Birmingham Railway
- Pre-grouping: London and North Western Railway
- Post-grouping: London, Midland and Scottish Railway

Key dates
- 1 May 1850: Station opens
- 6 June 1966: Station closes
Location

Lubenham railway station was a railway station serving Lubenham in Leicestershire, England. It was opened on the Rugby and Stamford Railway in 1850.

== History ==
Parliamentary approval was gained in 1846 by the directors of the London and Birmingham Railway for a branch from Rugby to the Syston and Peterborough Railway near Stamford. In the same year the company became part of the London and North Western Railway. The section from Rugby to Market Harborough, which included Lubenham, opened in 1850. Originally single track, it was doubled at the end of 1878.

At grouping in 1923 it became part of the London Midland and Scottish Railway. The line and station closed in 1966.

Preceding station	Disused railways	Following station
Theddingworth; Line and station closed	London and North Western Railway; Rugby to Peterborough Line	Market Harborough; Station open, line closed
