= Theddingworth railway station =

Former railway station in Leicestershire, England

Coordinates: 52.4686°N 1.0226°W

Theddingworth
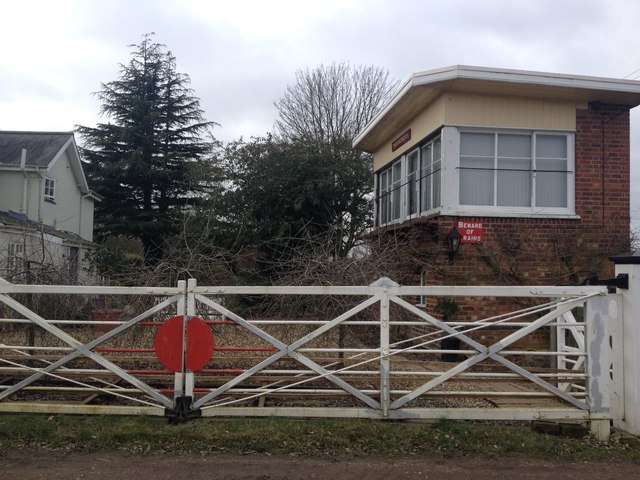
- The former signal box and level crossing gates in 2017

General information
- Location: Theddingworth, Leicestershire; England
- Platforms: 2

Other information
- Status: Disused

History
- Original company: London and North Western Railway
- Post-grouping: London, Midland and Scottish Railway

Key dates
- 1 May 1850: Station opens
- 6 June 1966: Station closes
Location

Theddingworth railway station was a railway station serving Theddingworth in Leicestershire, England. It was opened on the Rugby and Stamford Railway in 1850.

== History ==
The directors of the London and Birmingham Railway obtained the Rugby and Stamford Railway Act 1846 (9 & 10 Vict. c. lxvii) giving approval for a branch from Rugby to the Syston and Peterborough Railway near Stamford. In the same year the company became part of the London and North Western Railway. The section from Rugby to Market Harborough, which included Theddingworth, opened in 1850.

Although the official opening was not till 1 May 1850, some services may have been run on 29 April for the Market Harborough fair. Initially there were three train services daily each way.

A neat, compact station house was provided on the up (Rugby) side next to the level crossing with the signal box opposite. On the opposite down platform was a small timber waiting-room with a substantial awning.

Originally single track, the line was doubled at the end of 1878. There was a siding on the up (Rugby) side with a horse loading bay behind the railway offices and, in the Rugby direction, there was a long head shunt. At some time early in the century the signal box caught fire and a lack of running water made it difficult to put out. It was rebuilt with a modern superstructure on the original LNWR brick base.

At grouping in 1923 it became part of the London Midland and Scottish Railway. At the end of the 19th century there were eight trains on the line each day, four of them stopping at the intermediate stations. Around 1950 the service was six or seven trains a day, but this business disappeared in the next decade. Freight service was discontinued on 6 April 1964, and passenger services on 6 June 1966.

Filming for the 1967 film Robbery took place to the east of Theddingworth station. Scenes of the actual robbery were shot there.

There is still a Station Road with a pronounced dogleg where it crossed the track. The station building has been carefully preserved by its present owners, along with the signal box, waiting room and level crossing gates.

Preceding station	Disused railways	Following station
Welford and Kilworth; Line and station closed	London and North Western Railway; Rugby to Peterborough Line	Lubenham; Line and station closed
