= Yelvertoft and Stanford Park railway station =

Former railway station in Northamptonshire, England

Coordinates: 52.4005°N 1.1355°W

Yelvertoft and Stanford Park
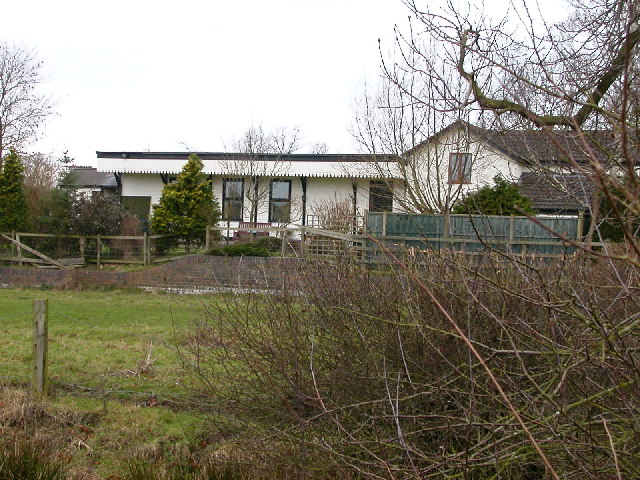

General information
- Location: Stanford-on-Avon & Yelvertoft, Northamptonshire; England
- Platforms: 2

Other information
- Status: Disused

History
- Original company: London and North Western Railway
- Post-grouping: London, Midland and Scottish Railway

Key dates
- 1 May 1850: Station opens as Stanford Hall
- 1 Jun 1870: renamed Yelvertoft
- December 1880: renamed Yelverftoft and Stanford Hall
- 1 February 1881: renamed Yelvertoft and Stanford Park
- 6 June 1966: Station closes
Location

Yelvertoft and Stanford Park railway station was a railway station that served the villages of Stanford-on-Avon and Yelvertoft in Northamptonshire, England. It was close to the stately home of Stanford Hall nearby in Leicestershire. It was opened as Stanford Hall on the Rugby and Stamford Railway in 1850.

Parliamentary approval was gained in 1846 by the directors of the London and Birmingham Railway for a branch from Rugby to the Syston and Peterborough Railway near Stamford. In the same year the company became part of the London and North Western Railway. The section from Rugby to Market Harborough, which included Yelvertoft, opened in 1850. Originally single track, it was doubled at the end of 1878.

At grouping in 1923 it became part of the London Midland and Scottish Railway.

Preceding station	Disused railways	Following station
Lilbourne; Line and station closed	London and North Western Railway; Rugby to Peterborough Line	Welford and Kilworth; Line and station closed
