= Leire Halt railway station =

Former railway station in Leicestershire, England

Leire Halt

General information
- Location: Leicestershire; England
- Coordinates: 52.5072°N 1.2324°W
- Grid reference: SP502922
- Platforms: 2

Other information
- Status: Disused

History
- Original company: London, Midland and Scottish Railway

Key dates
- 2 March 1925: Station opened
- 1 January 1962: Station closed
Location

Leire Halt railway station was a railway halt serving Leire in Leicestershire on the line between Leicester and Rugby.

The London, Midland and Scottish Railway opened the halt in 1925 on the Leicester – Rugby line of the former Midland Counties Railway. British Railways closed the Leicester – Rugby line and its stations in 1962.

Preceding station	Disused railways	Following station
Ullesthorpe; Line and station closed	London, Midland and Scottish Railway; Midland Counties Railway	Broughton Astley; Line and station closed
