= Countesthorpe railway station =

Former railway station in Leicestershire, England

Countesthorpe
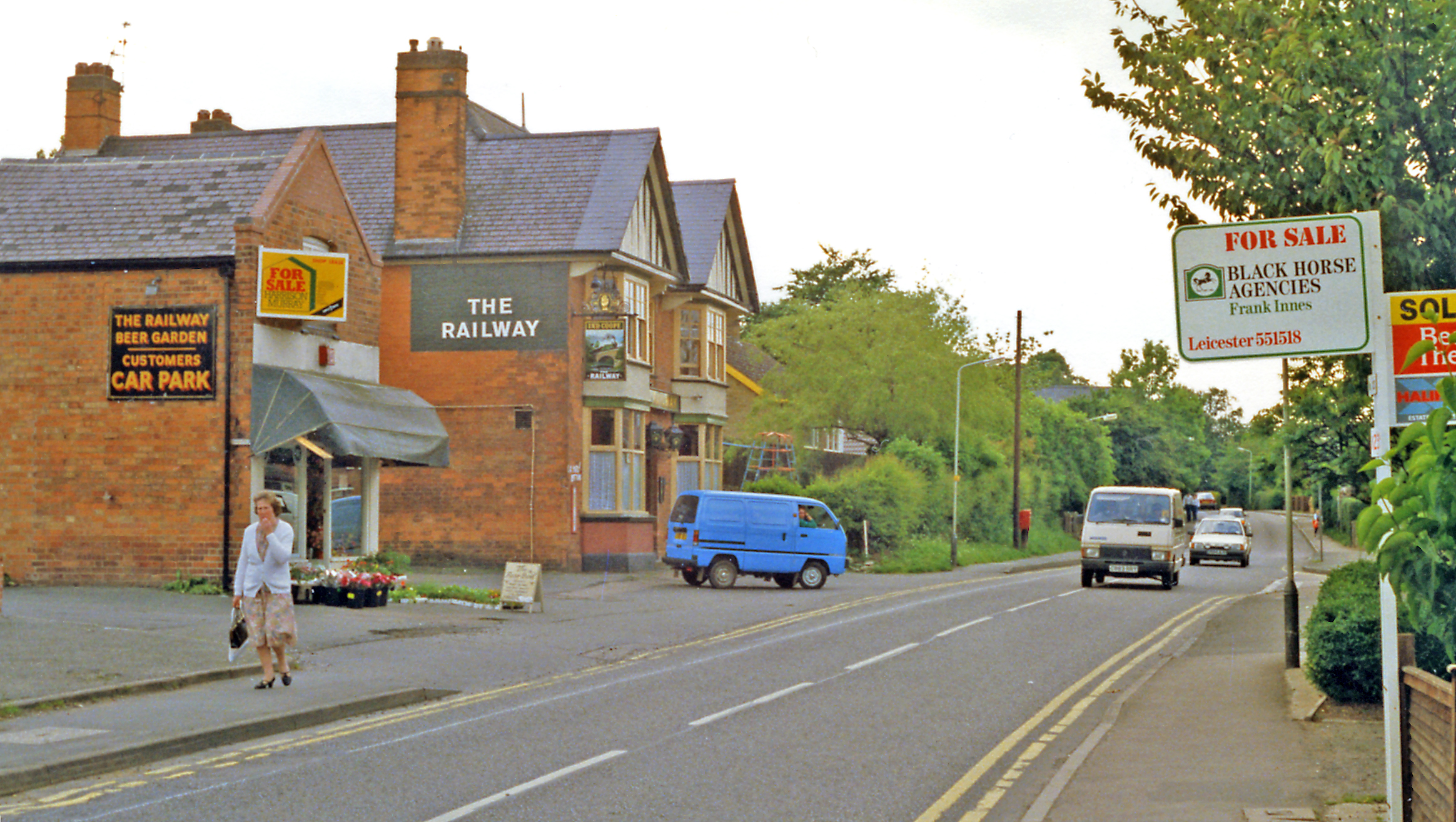
- The railway inn near the site of the station in 1988

General information
- Location: Countesthorpe, Blaby; England
- Coordinates: 52.5547°N 1.1511°W
- Grid reference: SP576955
- Platforms: 2

Other information
- Status: Disused

History
- Original company: Midland Counties Railway
- Pre-grouping: Midland Railway
- Post-grouping: London, Midland and Scottish Railway

Key dates
- 1840 – June 1842: Station opened
- 1 January 1962: Station closed
Location

Countesthorpe railway station was a railway station serving Countesthorpe in Leicestershire.

The station was on the Midland Counties Railway main line to Rugby, and it opened at some point between 1840 and June 1842. In 1844 the Midland Counties joined the North Midland Railway and the Birmingham and Derby Junction Railway to form the Midland Railway.

In 1857 the Midland completed a new main line south to Hitchin and the Leicester – Rugby section of the Midland Counties was relegated to a branch. British Railways closed the Leicester – Rugby line and its stations, including Countesthorpe which closed on 1 January 1962.

Preceding station	Disused railways	Following station
Broughton Astley; Line and station closed	Midland Railway; Midland Counties Railway	Wigston South; Line and station closed
