= Lubenham =

Village and civil parish in Leicestershire, England

Coordinates: 52.47983°N 0.96503°W

- Population: 860
- Civil parish: Lubenham
- District: Harborough
- Shire county: Leicestershire
- Region: East Midlands
- Country: England
- Sovereign state: United Kingdom
- Post town: Market Harborough
- Postcode district: LE16
- Dialling code: 01858
- Police: Leicestershire
- Fire: Leicestershire
- Ambulance: East Midlands
- UK Parliament: Harborough, Oadby and Wigston
- Website: www.lubenham.co.uk

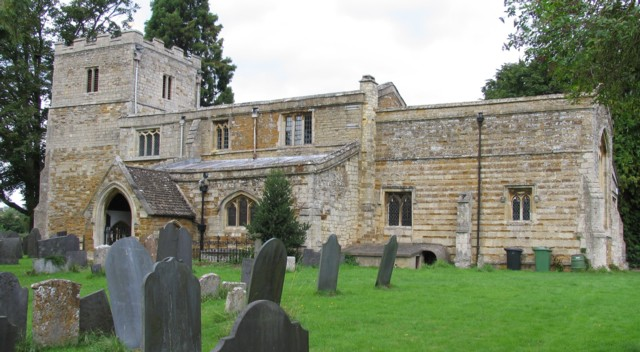
All Saints' Church, Lubenham

Lubenham is a village and civil parish approximately 2 miles (3.2 km) west of Market Harborough, in the Harborough district in the south of Leicestershire, England. At the 2021 Census, the parish had a population of 860. The first National Hunt Chase Challenge Cup was held in Lubenham, in the grounds of what is now Thorpe Lubenham Hall. Lubenham parish extends north to Gartree and west to Bramfield Park. The village appears in four entries in the Domesday Book of 1086.

== Toponymy ==
Attested in the Domesday Book as 'Lobenho', the name derives from 'Luba's or Lubba's spur(s) of land'. 'Lubba' being the name of the individual who once lived on the land and 'hōh' meaning 'hill-spur'. At some point, the suffix 'hōh' developed into the modern suffix 'ham' which is a phenomenon that has appeared in other English place-names.

== History ==
It is recorded in the Domesday Book that Lubenham was divided between three Anglo-Saxons named Arnketil, Oslac and Osmund in 1066. Following the Norman Conquest of England, the ownership of Lubenham had been transferred to the Norman ruling class. By 1086, Lubenham was divided into three fiefs: the first, consisting of 8 carucates of land, was held by a man named Robert, a tenant of the Archbishop of York. The second fief, comprising 7 carucates, was held by Robert de Buci under Countess Judith, while the third, consisting of 2 carucuates, was held by Osbern under Robert de Todeni.

In 1327, William Baud secured a grant to hold two weekly markets and a yearly fair at whitsuntide at his manor in Lubenham. William's markets were unpopular among local landowners and in 1330 and 1335, Ralph Loterington of Thorpe Lubenham and Ralph Mallesours were accused of causing damage to property and assaulting market officials. This conflict may have arisen from political differences relating to the Despenser War.

In 1247, the manor once belonging to Countess Judith was held by the Mallesours family until Anne Mallesours married Roger Prestwiche in the 14th century and the lordship of the manor was transferred to the Prestwiche family. The manor was held by the Prestwiche family for five generations until the ownership, through a series of marriages, was transferred to the Brooke family. Sir Basil Brooke was the Lord of the Manor of Lubenham in 1600 and owned 13 of the 30 farms in Lubenham at that time. He lived in what is now the Old Hall; a moated manor house to the east of the village. In 1608, Sir Basil Brooke sat before the Star Chamber in Westminster regarding the inclosure of land in Lubenham and claimed that his income of £300 a year was insufficient. In 1624, the manor was sold by the Brooke family to Ranulph Crewe, Chief Justice of the King's Bench. King Charles I reportedly stayed at the Old Hall the night before his defeat at the Battle of Naseby in 1645.

James Wright records in his History and Antiquities of the County of Rutland that the last known ancestor of the Colley family of Glaston was "John Colly of Lubbenham". The family later established themselves in Ireland and were ancestors of Richard Colley, who adopted the surname Wesley, was created Baron Mornington and was grandfather of the 1st Duke of Wellington.

== Transport ==
On 6 June 1966, Lubenham railway station on the Rugby and Stamford Railway line closed in the Beeching Axe. Lubenham lies on the A4304 road which connects the M1 to Market Harborough, a route for heavy goods vehicles. A young schoolboy from the village was killed on the road in 2006, and the Adam Smile Project exists to create an off-road cycle route to Market Harborough using the track of the former railway and improve road safety.

== Buildings ==
All Saints' Church, the medieval church at the centre of the village which holds regular services, has medieval wall paintings and box pews. Other features are the Easter sepulchre, the sedilia in the north chapel and the Renaissance reredos. The peal of 6 bells (augmented in 2000) is regularly rung by a band of volunteer ringers. Practice nights are Wednesdays from 7.30pm and visiting ringers of all standards are very welcome.

Papillon Hall was a country house outside Lubenham that was built in about 1620 and demolished in 1950. In about 1903 it was remodelled by the architect Sir Edwin Lutyens.

There is a public house, the Coach and Horses. The Tower House was built in 1771. Gore Lodge or "The House that Jack built" is a Grade II former farmhouse, converted to a hunting box with stables and cottage, in 1875 by Robert William Edis.

== Events ==
Lubenham was judged to be Midlands Calor Village of the Year in 2001 because of its community activities, among them its scarecrow weekend.

The regular Open Gardens event in aid of All Saints' Church held in June each year provides an opportunity for visitors to visit around 20 private gardens. The Village Hall hosts clubs and events.

Lubenham has a beacon which was made for HM the Queen's Diamond Jubilee celebrations. The beacon designed and made by an apprentice has been lit on special royal occasions such as the jubilee and the Queen's 90th birthday.

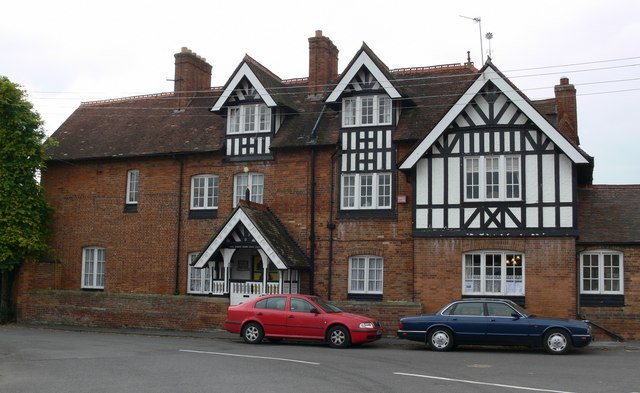
"The House that Jack built" (Gore Lodge)

The area boasts some lovely walks with abundant wildlife. Otters and kingfishers were seen on the River Welland in 2015.

In 2008/2009, the Lubenham Heritage Group published a Heritage Trail with an interpretation panel on the village green, a pamphlet and placed plaques on buildings of interest.

A cycling club known as the 'Lubenham Raiders' operates on Monday evenings, during the summer and has done so for many years, while other activities including short mat bowls, quizzes, heritage group and monthly coffee mornings take place in the Village Hall.
