= Tower House (disambiguation) =

A tower house is a tall fortified dwelling similar to the keep of a castle. See

- Tower houses in Britain and Ireland
  - Welsh Tower houses
- Tower houses in the Balkans

Tower House may also refer to:

- The tower of a tower castle
- Tower House (film), 1962 Indian Hindi-language film
- The Tower House, Holland Park, London, England
- Tower House, Leeds, now renamed Tower North Central
- Tower House, Brighton, East Sussex, England
- Tower House School, Richmond upon Thames, London, England
- Tower House, beside God's House Tower, Southampton, England
- The Tower House, Lubenham, Leicestershire, England
- Horatio Tower House, Worcester, Massachusetts, USA
- Lewis Tower House, Cumberland, Rhode Island, USA
- Tower House (Alexandria, Virginia), USA
- Tower House (Tokyo), Japan

== See also ==
- Tower castle
- Peel tower
