= Broughton Astley railway station =

Former railway station in Leicestershire, England

Broughton Astley
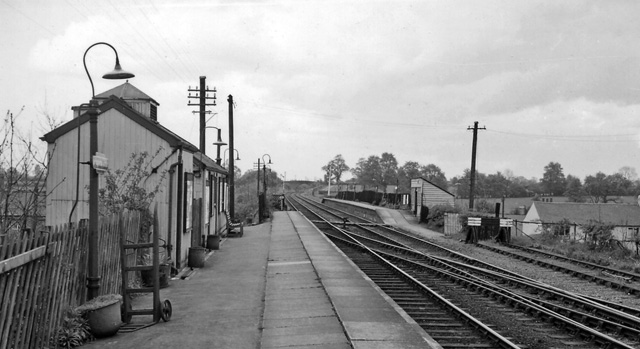
- Looking north at Broughton Astley station in 1961

General information
- Location: Broughton Astley, Harborough; England
- Coordinates: 52.5224°N 1.2144°W
- Grid reference: SP534919
- Platforms: 2

Other information
- Status: Disused

History
- Original company: Midland Counties Railway
- Pre-grouping: Midland Railway
- Post-grouping: London, Midland and Scottish Railway

Key dates
- 30 June 1840: Station opened as Broughton
- 1 July 1845: renamed Broughton Astley
- 1 October 1870: renamed Broughton
- 15 September 1879: renamed Broughton Astley
- 1 January 1962: Closed
Location

Broughton Astley railway station was a railway station serving Broughton Astley in Leicestershire, England.

The station was opened on 30 June 1840 on the Midland Counties Railway main line to Rugby. In 1844 the Midland Counties joined the North Midland Railway and the Birmingham and Derby Junction Railway to form the Midland Railway.

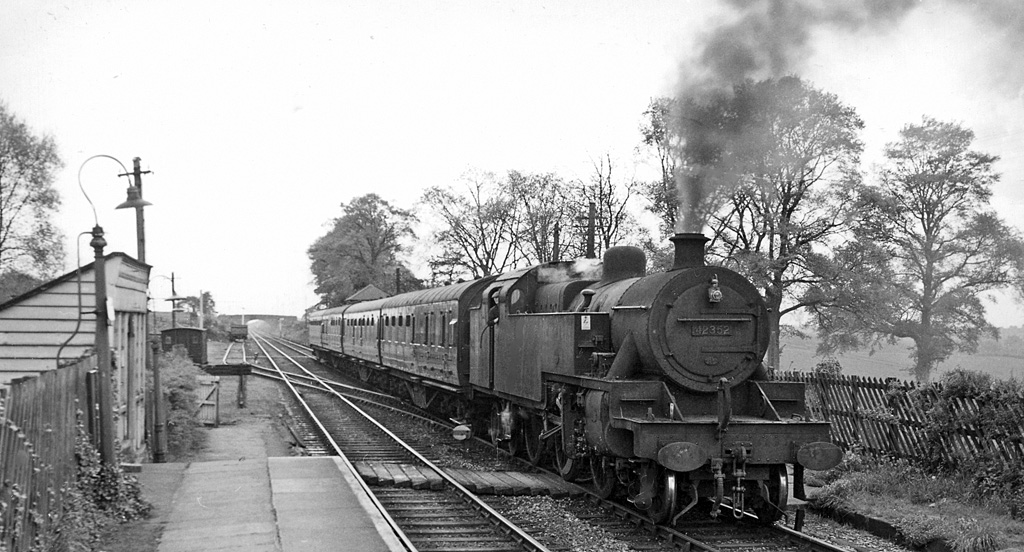
A train enters Broughton Astley station from the south in 1961

Originally named Broughton, the station was renamed several times: on 1 July 1845 it became Broughton Astley, reverting to the original name on 1 October 1870, but became Broughton Astley permanently from 15 September 1879.

In 1857 the Midland completed a new main line south to Hitchin and the Leicester – Rugby section of the Midland Counties was relegated to a branch. British Railways closed the Leicester – Rugby line and its stations, including Broughton Astley which closed on 1 January 1962.

Preceding station	Disused railways	Following station
Leire Halt; Line and station closed	Midland Railway; Midland Counties Railway	Countesthorpe; Line and station closed
