= Stanford-on-Avon =

Village in Northamptonshire, England

Coordinates: 52.4023°N 1.1348°W

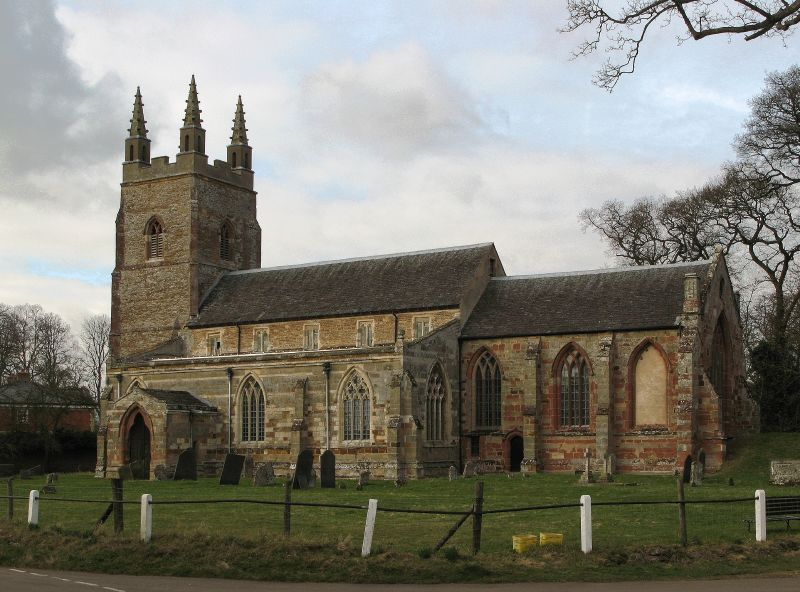
- Church of St Nicholas

- Location within Northamptonshire
- OS grid reference: SP589786
- Civil parish: Stanford
- Unitary authority: West Northamptonshire
- Ceremonial county: Northamptonshire
- Region: East Midlands
- Country: England
- Sovereign state: United Kingdom
- Post town: Northampton
- Postcode district: NN6
- Dialling code: 01788
- Police: Northamptonshire
- Fire: Northamptonshire
- Ambulance: East Midlands
- UK Parliament: Daventry

Stanford-on-Avon is a village in the civil parish of Stanford in West Northamptonshire, England. It lies next to the River Avon, which here forms the county boundary between Northamptonshire and Leicestershire. On the Leicestershire side of the river is Stanford Hall, a historic house. Stanford Reservoir is one mile north of the village. The population is included in the civil parish of Clay Coton.

The hamlet's name means 'Stone ford' situated on the River Avon.

In a field just north-east of the village there is a stone monument to Percy Pilcher, a 19th century aviation pioneer who died in a glider accident at the location of the monument in 1899.

The village was formerly served by Yelvertoft and Stanford Park railway station on the former Rugby and Stamford Railway which closed in 1966. The station is now a private house.

Stanford-on-Avon is now the only populated settlement within the civil parish of Stanford. The parish contains the remains of two deserted medieval villages of Downtown and Stanford.

== Church ==
The most notable building in the village is the church of St Nicholas, which dates from the 14th century, and is grade I listed. It contains the oldest metal organ pipes surviving in Britain. The upper part of the organ-case appears to be related to the Dallam organ at Tewkesbury Abbey, and therefore the pipes probably date from the 1630s (i.e. before the Cromwell era when many organs were destroyed).
