= Clifton Mill railway station =

Former railway station in Warwickshire, England

Coordinates: 52.38284°N 1.23110°W

Clifton Mill
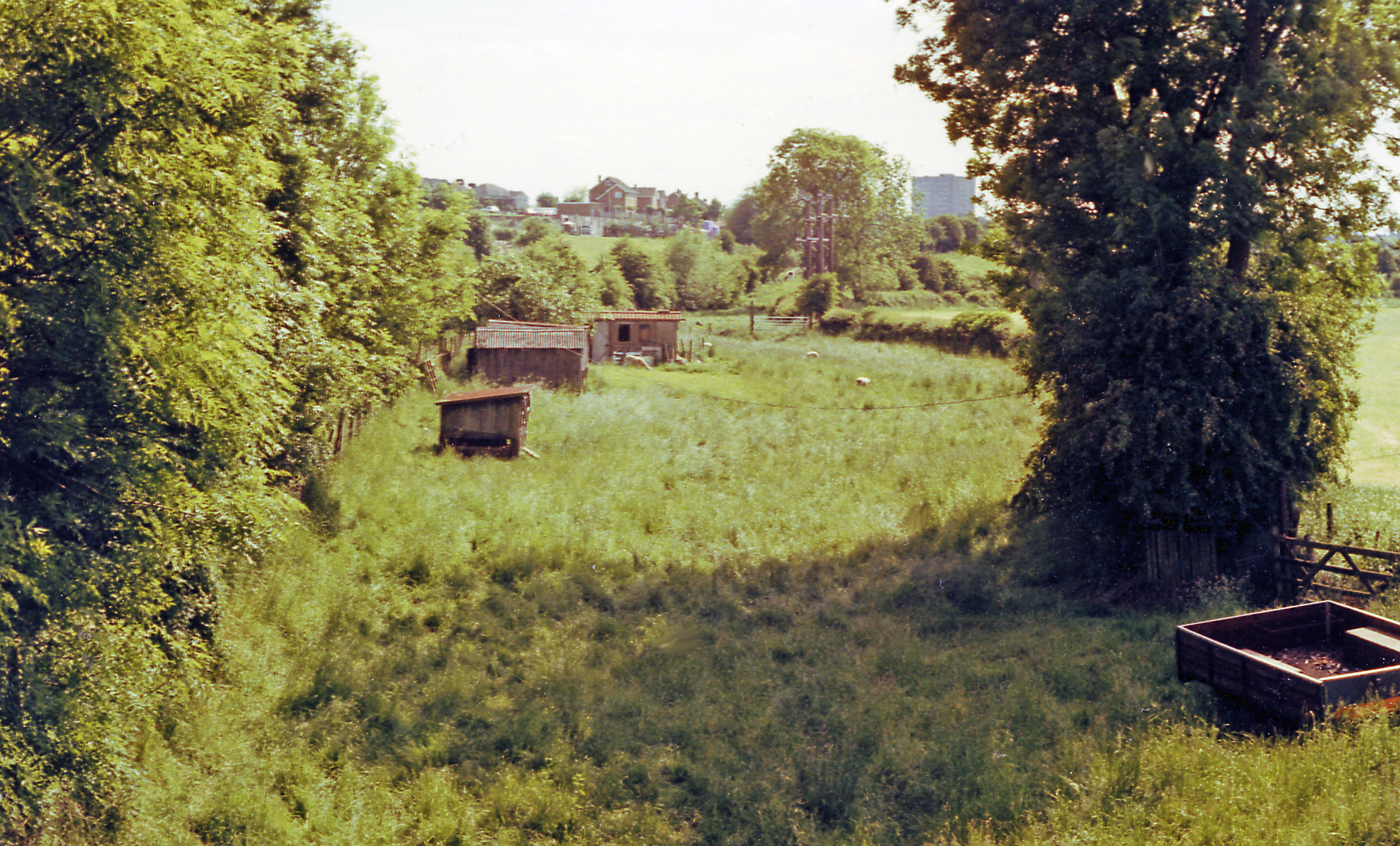
- Site of the station in 1988.

General information
- Location: Clifton-upon-Dunsmore, Warwickshire; England
- Platforms: 2

Other information
- Status: Disused

History
- Original company: London and North Western Railway
- Pre-grouping: London and North Western Railway
- Post-grouping: London, Midland and Scottish Railway

Key dates
- November 1864: Station opens
- 6 April 1953: Station closes
Location

Clifton Mill railway station was a railway station serving Clifton-upon-Dunsmore in the English county of Warwickshire. It was opened on the Rugby and Stamford Railway in 1864.

== History ==
Parliamentary approval was gained in 1846 to the directors of the London and Birmingham Railway for a branch from Rugby to the Syston and Peterborough Railway near Stamford. In the same year the company became part of the London and North Western Railway. The section from Rugby to Market Harborough was opened on 1 May 1850. Clifton Mill did not open until 1864. and although it was single track, it was doubled in 1878.

At grouping in 1923 it became part of the London Midland and Scottish Railway. The station closed on 6 April 1953 and the line closed in 1966.

== Site today ==
Station Road leads from the village centre terminating in a small Mill Lane. Some distance along the former are a number of buildings, where traces of the old track bed may still be made out.

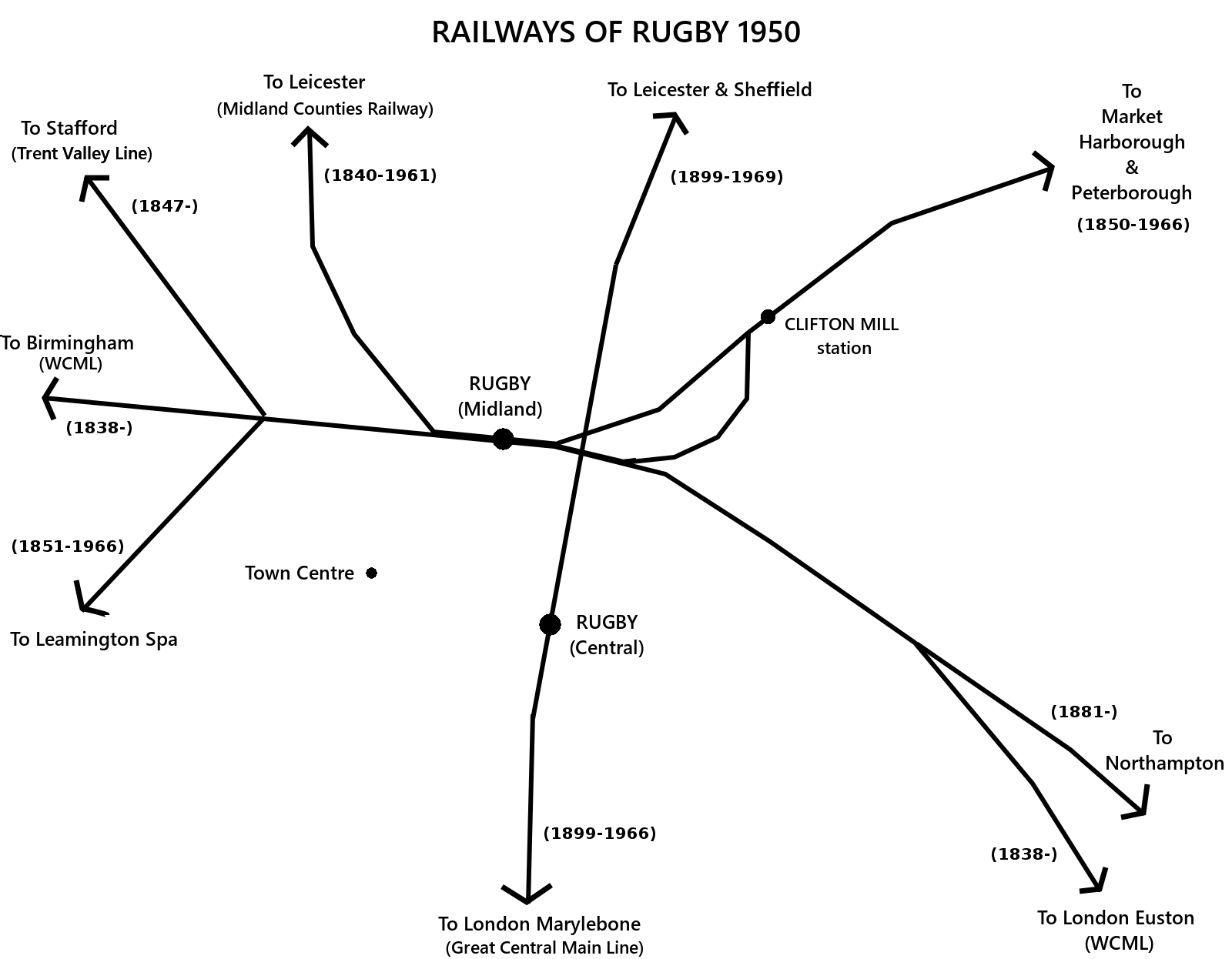
Map of the railways around Rugby in 1950, showing the location of Clifton Mill station

Preceding station	Disused railways	Following station
Rugby; Station open, line closed	London and North Western Railway; Rugby to Peterborough Line	Lilbourne; Line and station closed
