= Westerby Basset Hounds =

- Hunt type: Basset hunting
- Country: England

History
- Founded: 1931
- Parent pack: Walhampton Basset Hounds
- Founded by: Dr Eric Morrison

Hunt information
- Hound breed: English Basset
- Hunt country: Leicestershire, Northamptonshire, Warwickshire & Rutland
- Quarry: Hare
- Kennelled: South Kilworth
- Website: www.westerbybassets.co.uk

The Westerby Basset Hounds is a working basset pack.

== History ==
The Westerby Basset Hounds descend from the Walhampton Basset Hounds, founded in 1889 by Christopher and Godfrey Heseltine at Lymington in the New Forrest. In 1902, whilst Godfrey Heseltine was posted to India, the pack was sold to the Marquess Conyngham of Slane Castle in Ireland, and were known as the Slane Bassets, returning to the New Forrest upon Godrey’s return in 1910. Between 1915 and 1920, whilst Godfrey Heseltine served in the Great War and subsequently again in India, the pack was loaned to the Royal Naval Dockyard Rosyth and were known as the Rosyth Bassets, again returning to Godfrey who moved the pack to Lutterworth in Leicestershire, where the pack remained until his death in 1931.

In 1932 the rump of the pack was purchased by Dr Eric Morrison who renamed the pack the Westerby Basset Hounds after the village of Smeeton Westerby. After World War II, due to the increased cultivation of arable land within the hunt’s county, a more active hound than a traditional basset was sought. After unsuccessful attempts at outcrosses with Welsh Hounds and Beagles, the now Colonel Morrison (after his World War II service) very successfully incorporated stud book Harrier blood into the pack, resulting in hounds with the same voice and nose, but less bone, shorter backs and shorter ears. The resulting hounds were the first of what was to be called the English Basset, a type of dog now used by a number of English Basset hound packs. More recently, further infusions with West Country Harriers, Beagles and pure Bassets have been incorporated into the type.

== Hunt country ==
The Westerby Basset Hound’s country extends from Melton Mowbray in the north to Daventry in the south and Nuneaton in the west to Uppingham in the east. The country encompasses the whole of the Fernie Hunt’s country and parts of the Atherstone, Cottesmore and Pytchley Hunt’s countries.
