= Ullesthorpe railway station =

Former railway station in Leicestershire, England

Ullesthorpe
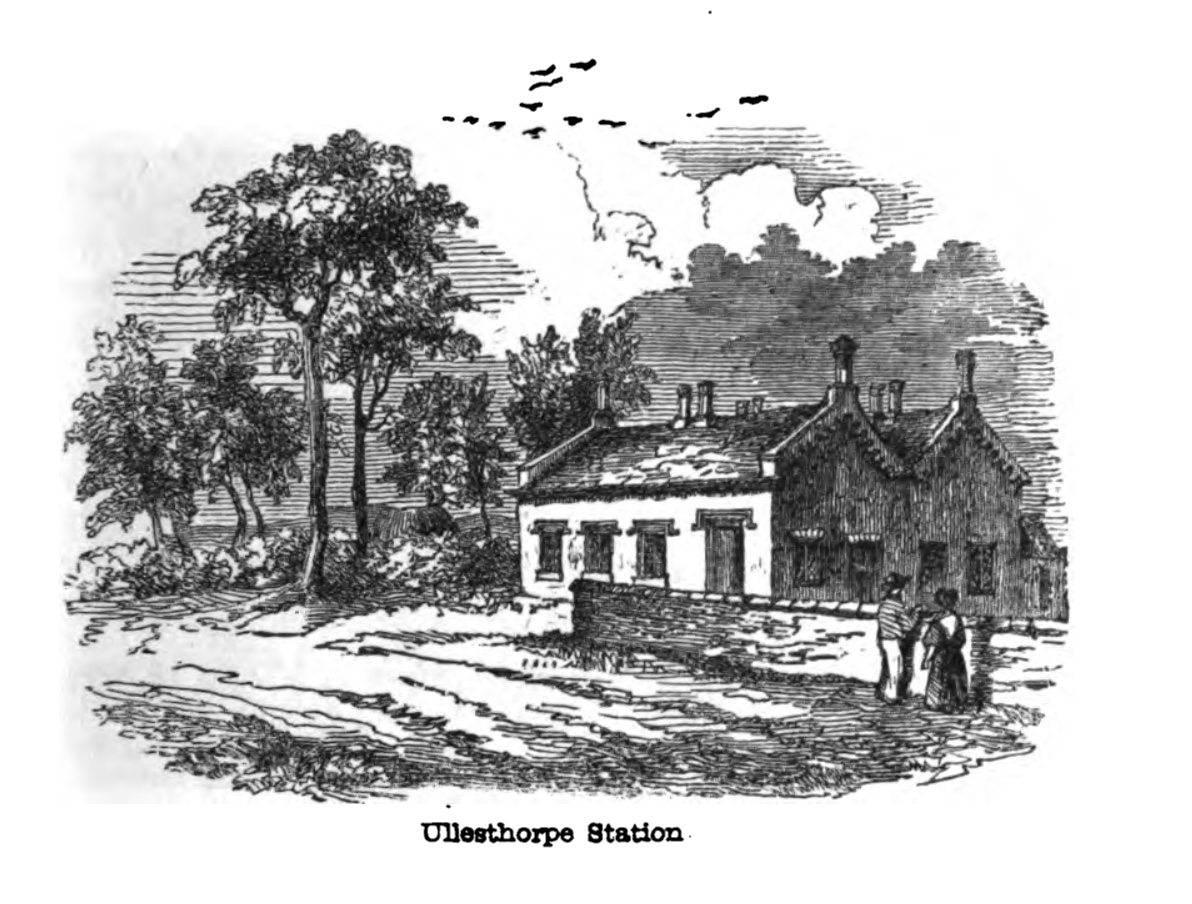
- The station in 1840, from the Midland Counties Railway Companion

General information
- Location: Ullesthorpe, Harborough; England
- Coordinates: 52.4822°N 1.2563°W
- Grid reference: SP506874
- Platforms: 2

Other information
- Status: Disused

History
- Original company: Midland Counties Railway
- Pre-grouping: Midland Railway
- Post-grouping: London, Midland and Scottish Railway

Key dates
- 30 June 1840: Station opened as Ullesthorpe
- 1 May 1879: renamed Ullesthorpe for Lutterworth
- 1 August 1897: renamed Ullesthorpe and Lutterworth
- 1 February 1930: renamed Ullesthorpe
- 1 January 1962: Station closed
Location

Ullesthorpe railway station was a railway station serving Ullesthorpe in Leicestershire, England.

The station was opened on 30 June 1840 on the Midland Counties Railway main line to Rugby. In 1844 the Midland Counties joined the North Midland Railway and the Birmingham and Derby Junction Railway to form the Midland Railway.

Originally named Ullesthorpe, the station was renamed several times: on 1 May 1879 it became Ullesthorpe for Lutterworth, being amended to Ullesthorpe and Lutterworth on 1 August 1897 before reverting to the original name on 1 February 1930.

In 1857 the Midland completed a new main line south to Hitchin and the Leicester – Rugby section of the Midland Counties was relegated to a branch. British Railways closed the Leicester – Rugby line and its stations, including Ullesthorpe which closed on 1 January 1962.

Preceding station	Disused railways	Following station
Rugby; Line closed, station open	Midland Railway; Midland Counties Railway	Leire Halt; Line and station closed
