= The Tower House, Lubenham =

Building in Lubenham, Leicestershire, England

Coordinates: 52.4776°N 0.9629°W

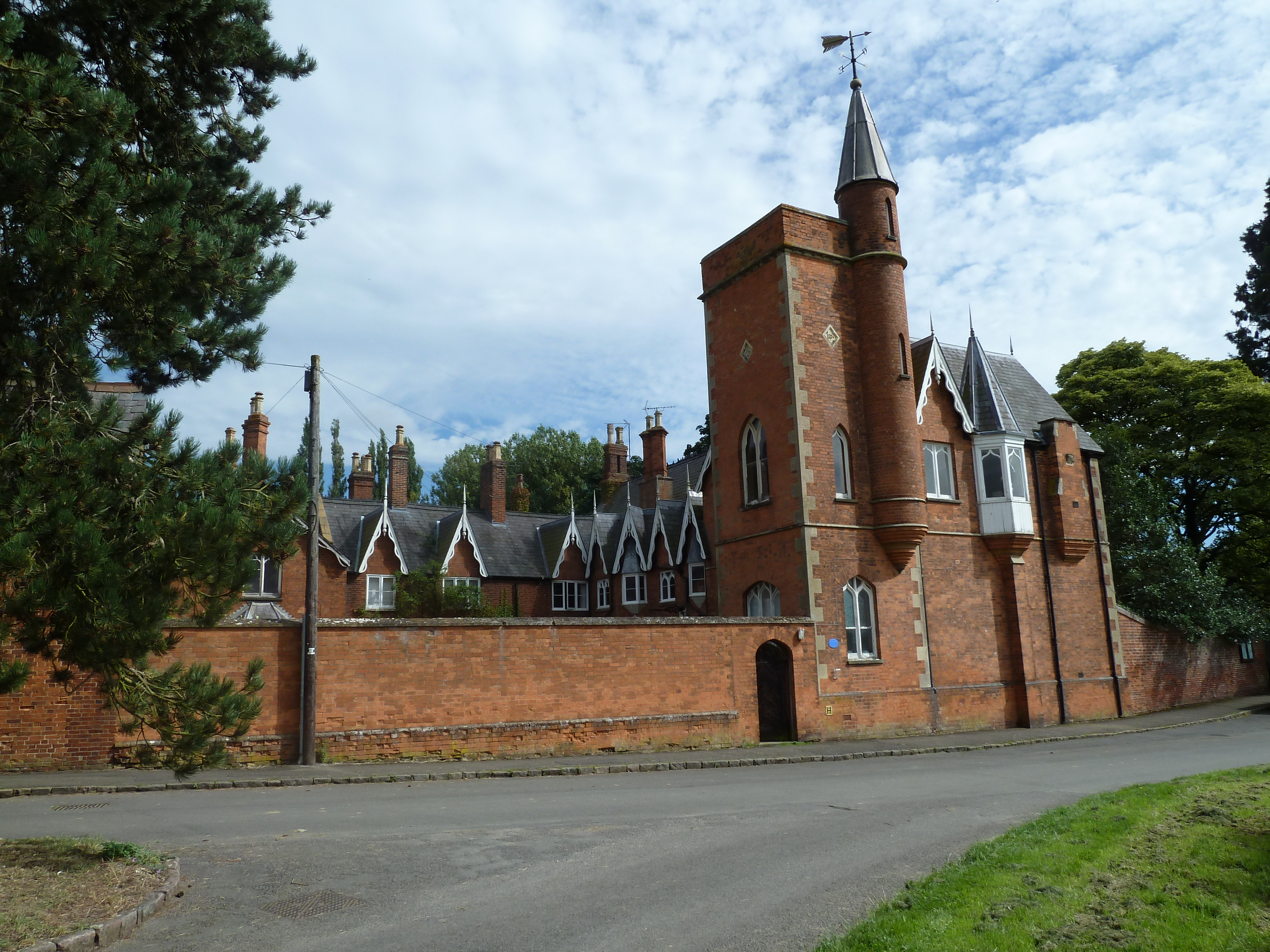
The Tower House, Lubenham

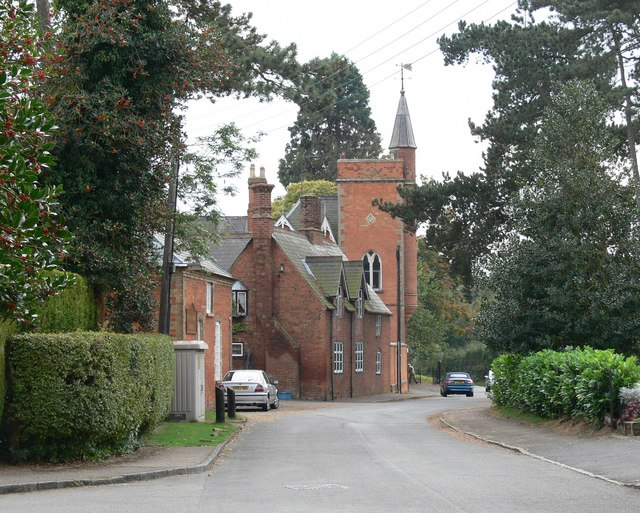
View of The Tower House, from down the lane

The Tower House, formerly known as The Cottage or Lubenham Cottage is a Grade II listed Georgian house in Lubenham, Leicestershire, England. It is situated to the north of the churchyard on Rushes Lane. Originally a farmhouse, it was enlarged by Cubitts in 1865 as a hunting box for Benedict John "Cherry" Angell, with adjoining stables added in 1852. During the enlargement a tower was added to survey nearby horse racing. It became a Grade II listed building on 9 March 1989.
