= Kilworth House =

Country house hotel in Kilworth, Leicestershire, England

Coordinates: 52°26′45″N 1°06′54″W

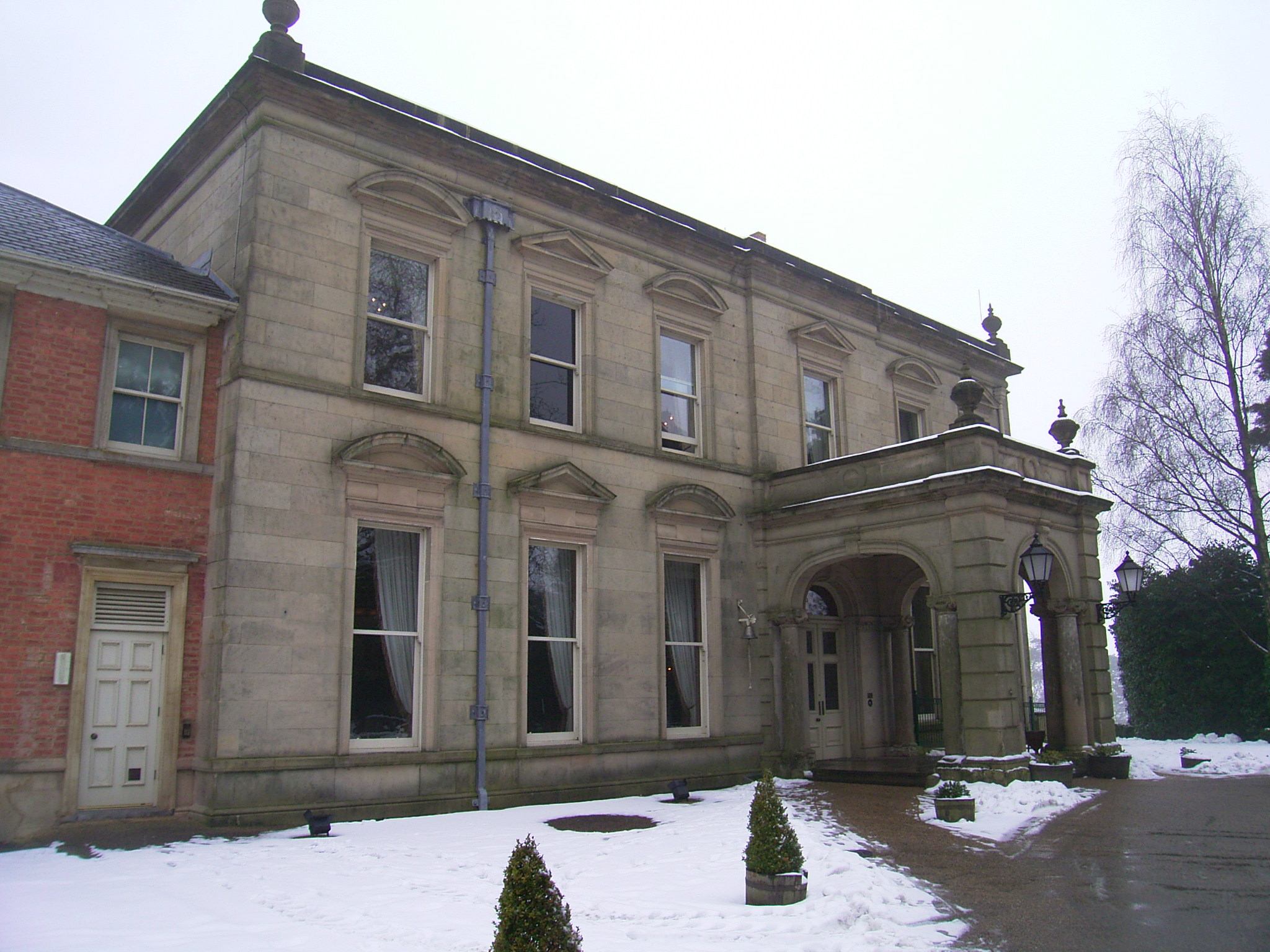
Kilworth House

Kilworth House is a four star country house hotel, located west of North Kilworth, Leicestershire.

== History ==
This grade II listed Italianate country house was built as a family home towards the end of the nineteenth century for John Entwisle, the High Sheriff of Leicestershire.

John Entwistle was born in 1856 at Foxholes near Rochdale to a wealthy family involved in the Lancashire woollen trade. He subsequently moved to the Midlands where he became a successful local businessman and lived in North Kilworth. In 1888, aged just 32, he became High Sheriff of Leicestershire and commissioned a Mr A E Purdie to design Kilworth House which was completed in 1891.

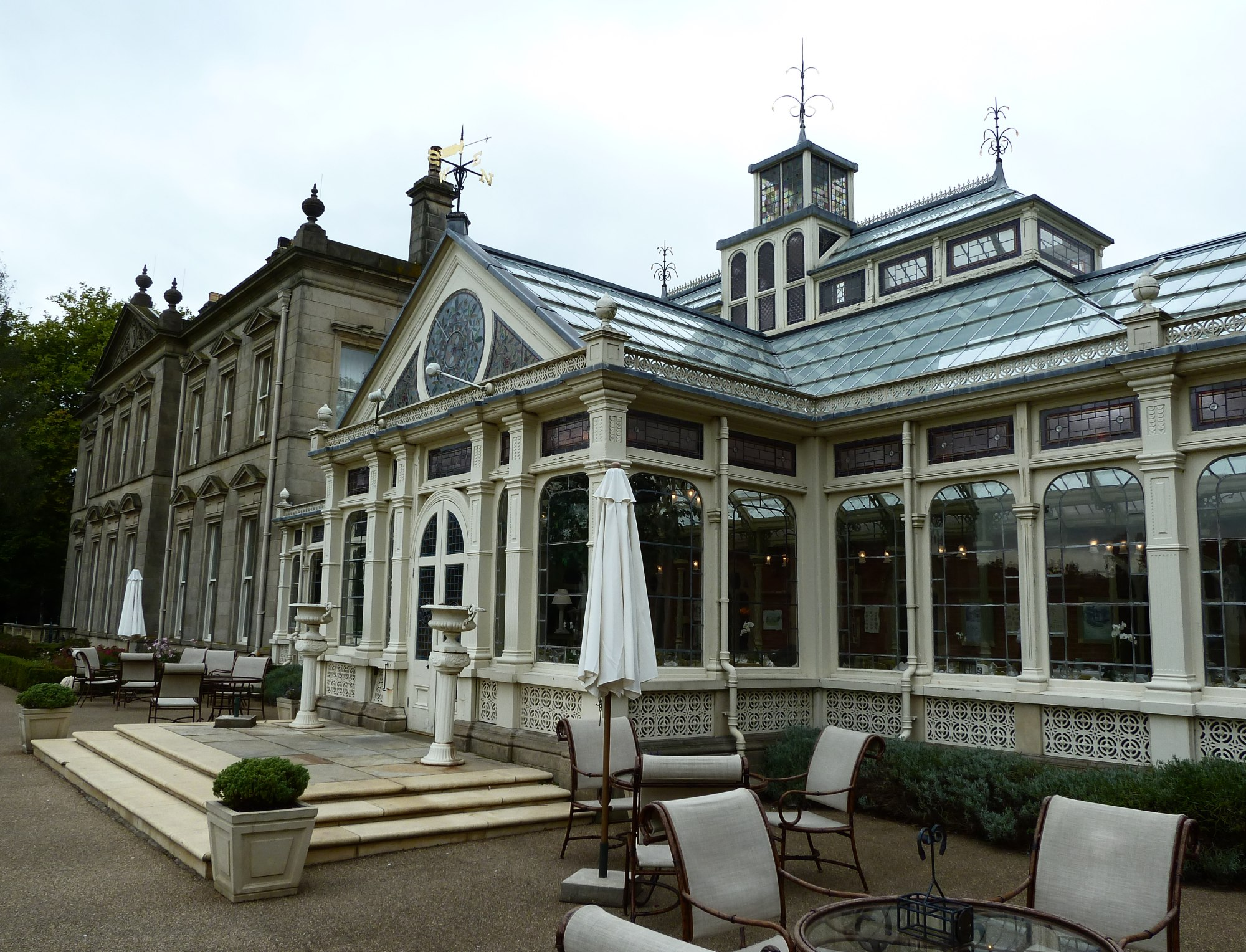
Kilworth House Orangery

When John Entwistle died in 1945 the house and his entire estate passed to his second wife, Florence. When she died during the 1960s, the Snowden family bought Kilworth House. During the late 1970s, Tony Iommi, Black Sabbath guitarist, lived at the house while dating one of the Snowden daughters. In 1999, the Snowdens sold Kilworth House to the current owners who began a project of restoration and redevelopment of the House to create a Hotel.
