= North Kilworth =

Village and civil parish in Leicestershire, England

Coordinates: 52°26′44″N 1°05′42″W

North Kilworth is a village and civil parish in the Harborough district, in south Leicestershire, England, north of South Kilworth. The population of the civil parish at the 2011 census was 597. Largely bypassed by the A4304 road, the village consists of a mix of old and new housing and includes a primary school and the parish church of St. Andrew's dating from the 13th century.

At the time of the Domesday survey (1086) there were two settlements Chivelesworde and Cleveliorde, both belonging to the vill of Stanford-on-Avon across the border in Northamptonshire; they were given by Guy de Reinbudcurt to Benedict, founding abbot of Selby, Yorkshire later differentiated into North and South Kilworth. In -iorde can be immediately recognized yard, and the -worde or -worth form of the same suffix can be recognized in garth, all of them words denoting hedged enclosures that each belonged to Ceofel.

The site of the "Old Hall" was noted to the northwest of the church, enclosed on three sides by a moat 18 feet wide and three feet deep with further earthworks. The moat has recently been dug out to create a water filled area for wildlife. The village is located on the edge of a large natural aquifer which accounts for the large number of springs in and around the area. Recent cessation of water extraction by Severn Trent water (for use in the nearby Market Harborough conurbation) has led to a rise in the local water table.

== Facilities ==
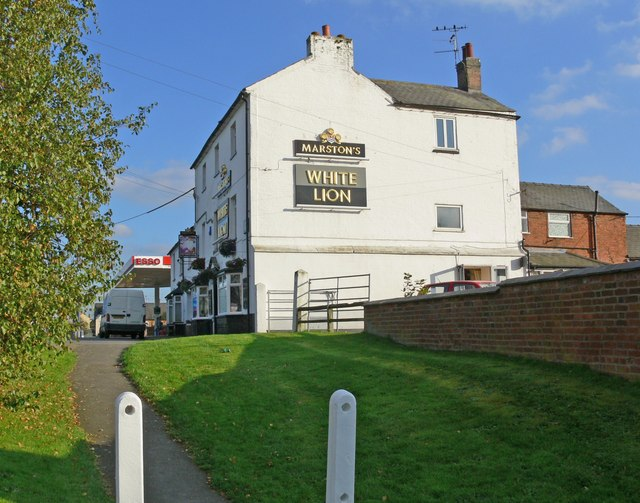
The White Lion

There are no shops in North Kilworth, however a petrol station serves basic amenities. An all weather tennis court area is situated opposite the school as well as a large football pitch area. North Kilworth F.C. play in the Leicestershire Senior League.

The White Lion pub serves food and is popular with people attending Kilworth House hotel theatre.

The Parish of North Kilworth also contains the Kilworth Springs Golf Club, Kilworth House Hotel and Outdoor Theatre.

== See also ==
- Kilworth House
