= South Kilworth =

Village in Leicestershire, England

Coordinates: 52.431°N 1.109°W

- Location within Leicestershire
- Population: 513 (2011 Census)
- OS grid reference: SP605818
- District: Harborough
- Shire county: Leicestershire
- Region: East Midlands
- Country: England
- Sovereign state: United Kingdom
- Post town: LUTTERWORTH
- Postcode district: LE17
- Dialling code: 01858
- Police: Leicestershire
- Fire: Leicestershire
- Ambulance: East Midlands
- UK Parliament: Harborough

South Kilworth is a village and civil parish in the southern part of Leicestershire, England, south of North Kilworth. The parish has a population of 430, according to the 2001 Census, and is part of the district of Harborough. The population had risen to 513 at the 2011 census.

== History ==
At the time of the Domesday survey (1086) there were two settlements Chivelesworde and Cleveliorde which later differentiated into North and South Kilworth. In -iorde can be immediately recognised yard, and the -worde or -worth form of the same suffix can be recognised in garth, all of them words denoting hedged enclosures, which each belonged to Ceofel. In it was noted that the site to the south of the village of the "manor house", actually a grange of Selby Abbey, Yorkshire, was marked by a dry moat 22 feet wide, and fishponds to its northwest. Both this site and the "Old Hall" site in North Kilworth had been part of the lands owned across the border in Stanford-on-Avon, Northamptonshire, by a certain Leuric.

In 1920, March 10, The Prince of Wales (Edward VIII) attended the Pytchley Hunt at South Kilworth. From 1956, the Westerby Basset Hounds have been kennelled in South Kilworth.
