= Rugby railway station =

Railway station in Warwickshire, England

Rugby
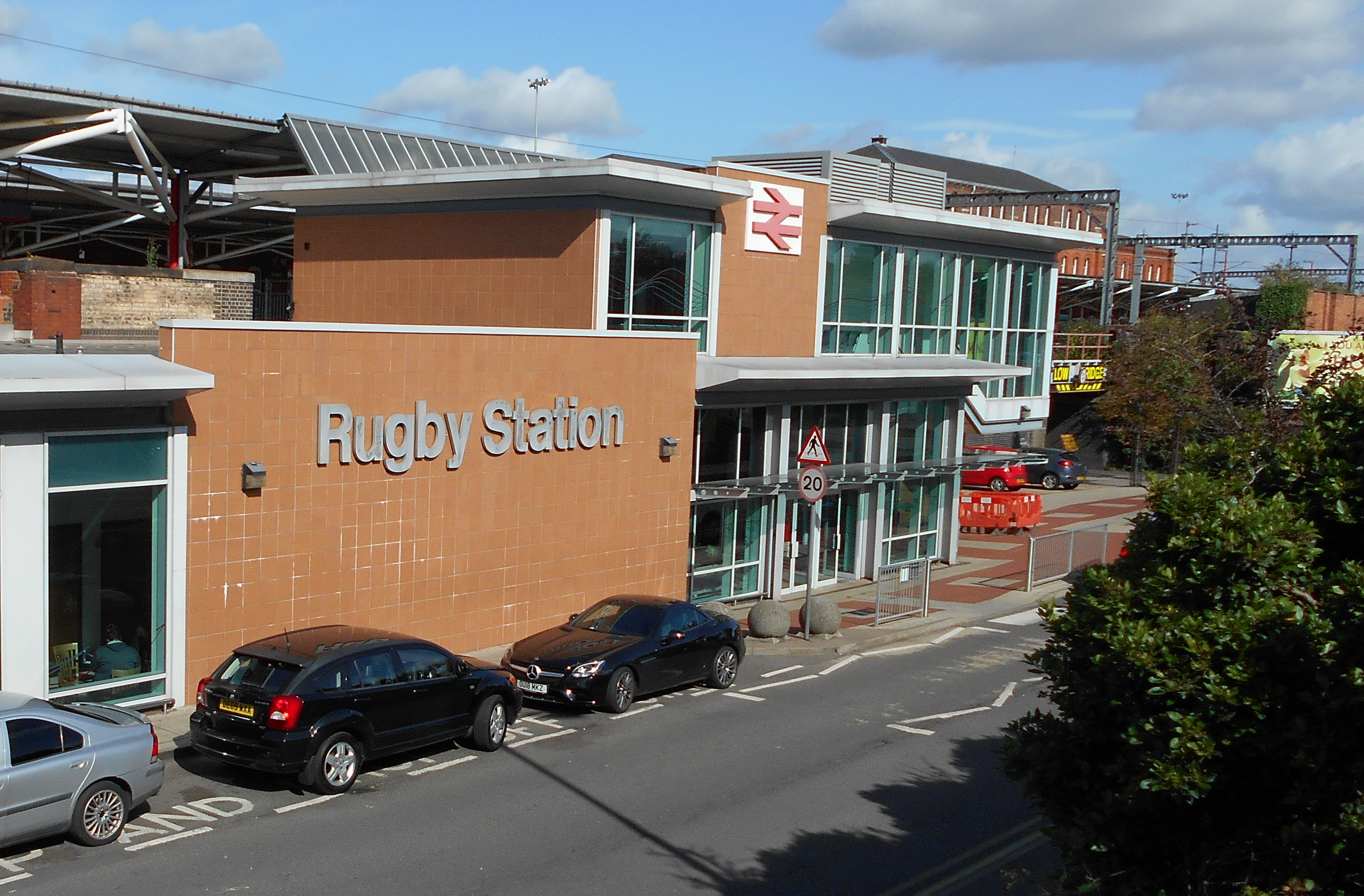
- Station entrance in September 2019

General information
- Location: Rugby, Borough of Rugby, England
- Coordinates: 52.379°N 1.250°W
- Grid reference: SP511759
- Manager: Avanti West Coast
- Platforms: 6

Other information
- Station code: RUG
- Classification: DfT category C1

History
- Opened: 9 April 1838 (as Rugby)
- Original company: London and Birmingham Railway
- Pre-grouping: London and North Western Railway
- Post-grouping: London, Midland and Scottish Railway

Key dates
- 4 July 1840: First station replaced by a second
- 5 July 1885: Second station replaced by a third
- 25 September 1950: Renamed Rugby Midland
- 4 May 1970: Renamed Rugby
- 2006–2008: Remodelled

Passengers
- 2021/22: ▲1.696 million
- Interchange: ▲63,266
- 2022/23: ▲1.913 million
- Interchange: ▲0.181 million
- 2023/24: ▲2.160 million
- Interchange: ▼0.175 million
- 2024/25: ▲2.392 million
- Interchange: ▼0.170 million
- 2025/26: ▲2.562 million
- Interchange: ▲0.221 million
Location
Notes
- Passenger statistics from the Office of Rail and Road

Rugby railway station serves the market town of Rugby, in Warwickshire, England. The current station dates from 1885; two previous stations dating from 1838 and 1840 respectively existed at locations to the west of the current one. It has been Rugby's only station since the closure of Rugby Central in 1969, on the now-abandoned Great Central Main Line route through the town. Between 1950 and 1970, the station was known as Rugby Midland before reverting to its original title. It underwent an extensive remodelling between 2006 and 2008; new platforms were added and a new ticket office and entrance building were constructed. The original Victorian part of the station was retained in the upgrade.

Rugby station is at the centre of two important junctions of the West Coast Main Line (WCML) connecting London to Birmingham, North West England and Scotland. The junction between the Trent Valley line to the North West and the Rugby–Birmingham–Stafford line to Birmingham is a short distance west of the station. East of the station, the Northampton loop diverges at a junction from the direct line to London. Until the 1960s, it also had routes to Leicester, Peterborough East and Leamington Spa (Avenue) but these have all since been closed.

The present station, managed by Avanti West Coast, is located roughly half a mile north of Rugby town centre. On the WCML as a whole, it lies 82 miles (132 km) north of London Euston and 319 miles (513 km) south of Glasgow Central.

== History ==
=== First station (1838–40) ===
The first railway station to be built in Rugby was a wooden temporary structure located around half a mile to the west of the present station. It opened on 9 April 1838 when the London and Birmingham Railway was constructed. However great difficulty in constructing the Kilsby Tunnel in Northamptonshire delayed the full opening of the line, which was not finished in time for the coronation of Queen Victoria on 28 June 1838. Aware of the lucrative traffic the event would generate, the company opened the north end of the line, between Birmingham and Rugby, and the south end from London to a temporary station at Denbigh Hall near Bletchley, with a stagecoach shuttle service linking the two parts to allow through journeys to London. The line was officially fully opened on 17 September 1838, with the first passenger train from London to Birmingham arriving that day.

At the time of the railway's construction, the small market town of around 2,500 inhabitants was notable only for Rugby School. The town was around half a mile to the south, uphill from the station, which at the time was located in open countryside. The original station was located on the western side of where the railway crossed Newbold Road (the Rugby to Leicester turnpike road, now the A426) because at the time this was the only road north from Rugby.

=== Second station (1840–1885) ===
The first station lasted only a few years. When a junction was made with the Midland Counties Railway in 1840, a new station was built at the site of the junction, which opened on 4 July 1840; it was 990 yards (905 m) to the east of the original station, and 150 yards (140 m) to the west of the present station. A new road, Railway Terrace had to be built to link it to the town centre, because at the time it was located in open countryside.

This second station was effectively managed by two companies – the London and North Western Railway and the Midland Railway – and for this reason grew up in a haphazard fashion. It was at first no more than a temporary wooden structure, but was gradually rebuilt into a more permanent structure over the following decade. This station consisted of platforms at each side of the track with one bay platform. The platforms were rather low and passengers complained of having to perform an "acrobatic feat" to board trains.

The station was at the centre of a busy junction and often saw chaotic scenes. It featured, only lightly disguised, in Charles Dickens's story Mugby Junction: This was inspired by an incident in April 1866, when Charles Dickens was travelling from London to Liverpool. Dickens's train made an unscheduled stop at Rugby due to one of the carriages catching fire. While waiting for his journey to resume, he went into the refreshment room for a cup of coffee, and the proprietess, clearly not recognising the celebrity author, treated him rudely. Inspired by this, his story 'Mugby Junction' in chapter three made a scathing attack on railway refreshment rooms and their staff.

=== The present station (1885–) ===
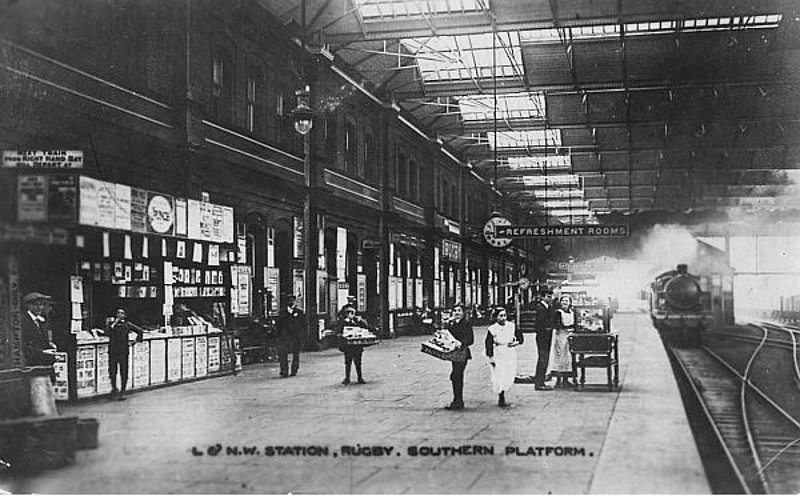
Rugby station in 1917

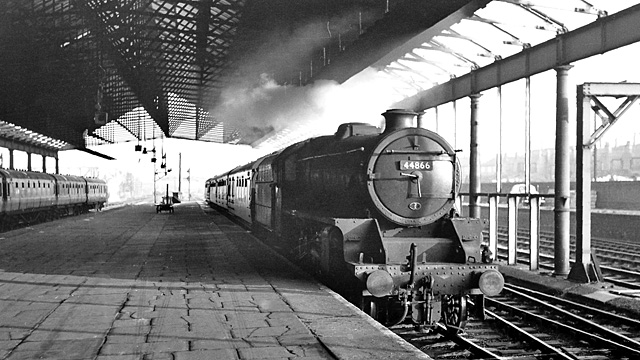
The station in 1959

The second station lasted until the 1880s, when a new line from Rugby to Northampton (the Northampton loop) was built, the old station was deemed by the LNWR to be no-longer satisfactory, and in 1882, £70,000 was allocated to replace it with the current station which opened on 5 July 1885. Another £30,000 was allocated to build a hotel, although this was never built. The Midland Railway retained the part of the older station which it had managed, however. One platform of the old station, separate from the new station, continued to be used by local trains on the Midland Railway's branch to Leicester until 8 March 1930. No trace of this now remains, however, as it was demolished in the 1960s to make way for the postal sorting office.

When constructed the station consisted of one large island platform with bay platforms at each end for terminating local services. The main island platforms are accessed from a tunnel at road level and a ramp leading to the platforms. When constructed the station had a large steel and glass trainshed roof which consisted of 117 ft (35.6 m) wide spans on each side, covering the station platforms and tracks. Originally the sides of the station had glass side screens but these were later removed. The condition of the roof deteriorated, and in the 1980s the glass over the tracks was removed, and finally the entire structure was dismantled between 2000 and 2002 when it became unstable, and was replaced with modern canopies over the platforms.

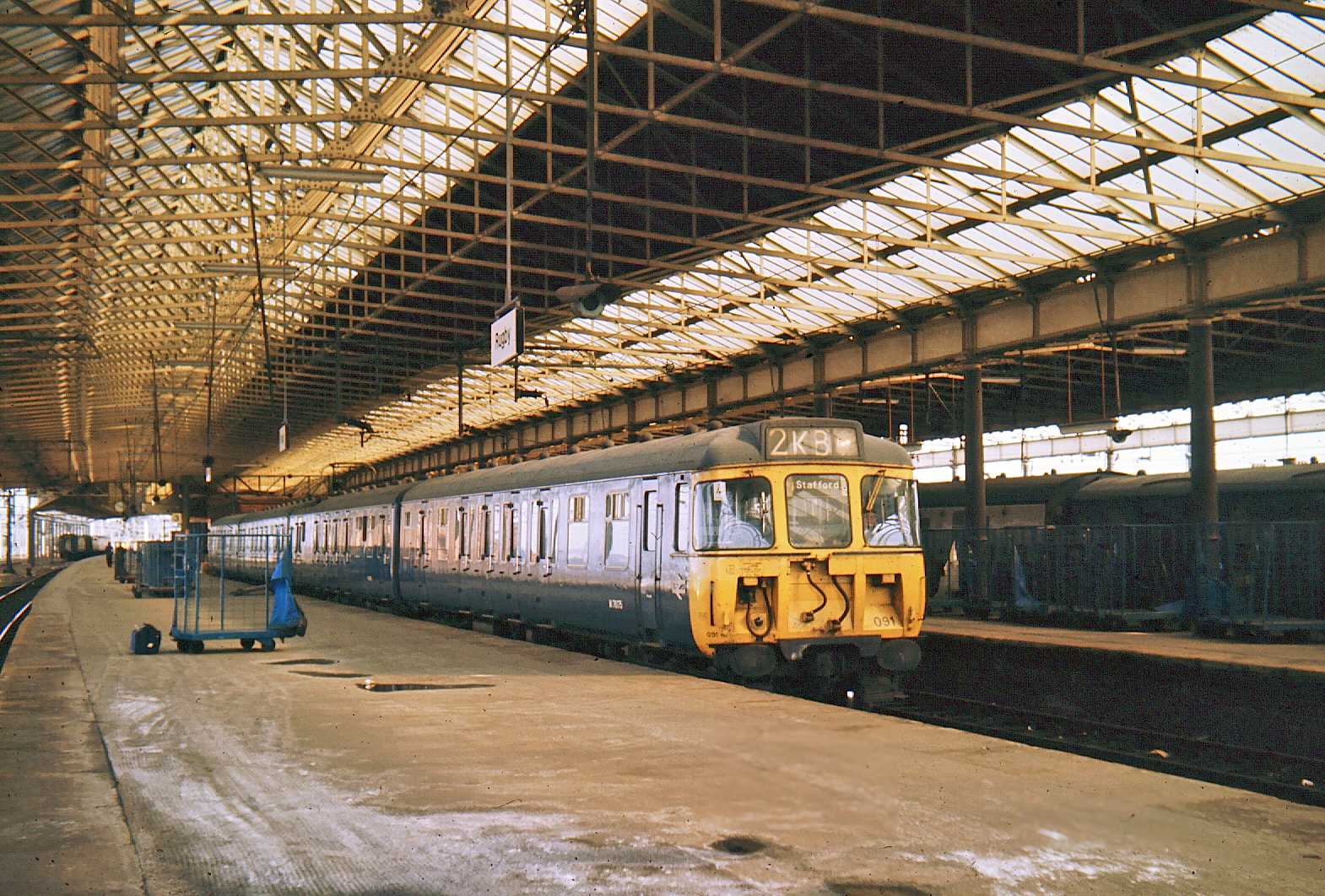
A Class 310 electric multiple unit at one of the former northbound bay platforms, 1975

The station had one of the longest platforms of any British railway station, at 1,381 feet (421 m), but the two main island platforms were both shortened as part of the 2007–08 station upgrade. The platform was long enough to allow two trains to call at it at the same time. This unusual feature was enabled by 'scissors crossings' halfway along the platforms. The scissor crossings were X-shaped junctions which allowed one train to pass another one already in the platform, and call into the same platform ahead of it, and allowed the train to the rear to pull out of the station, effectively doubling the capacity of the platform. The scissor crossings remained in use until the railway was electrified in the 1960s.

In 1899 a second station, Rugby Central, was opened; to distinguish it, the present station became known as Rugby Midland. Central station was closed in 1969 and Midland station reverted to Rugby in 1970.

The station came under the management of the London and North Western Railway (LNWR) (1885–1923), and then the London, Midland and Scottish Railway (LMS) (1923–1948) and then the nationalised British Railways (1948–1997). It is now owned by Network Rail.

==== 2006–2008 remodelling ====
As a part of the West Coast Main Line modernisation programme carried out by Network Rail, major track restructuring work was carried out to allow higher speed running through Rugby. Previously non-stopping trains passing through Rugby were limited to 75 mph, the track upgrades raised the speed to 125 mph, thus eliminating another bottleneck from the WCML. The station itself also underwent a major £170 million redevelopment which included:

- The addition of three new through platforms, bringing the total up to five, including a new platform on the south side of the station and a second island platform on the north side.
- The construction of a new entrance building and ticket office: Historically all of the station's facilities, including the ticket office, were concentrated on the station's single island platform, which was accessed from street level by a subway. The main entrance to the station therefore consisted of a simple opening to the subway. The additional platforms required that the ticket office be moved to a new entrance building at the front of the station.

It was at one time thought that remodelling of the track layout would entail complete demolition of the present station, but the final plans involved retention of the existing island platform and buildings. Work began in September 2006 and was completed late in 2008.

The platform on the south side of the station opened for use on 29 May 2007, and, as a result, all of the platforms were renumbered. This platform became Platform 1, the former Platform 1 became Platform 2 and 2 became 4. The additional platforms on the north side of the station are numbered Platforms 5 and 6 and they opened on 27 August 2008. Platform 8 became Platform 3. At the same time four former westbound bay platforms originally numbered 3 to 6, and one eastbound bay numbered 7 were removed.

Another distinctive feature of the local railway landscape also vanished at this time – the 'bird cage' bridge. This was a 'heavy' girder bridge of two substantial spans over the West Coast Main Line to the east ('up' side) of the station. This was the means by which the Great Central Main Line crossed the London & North Western Railway competing line.

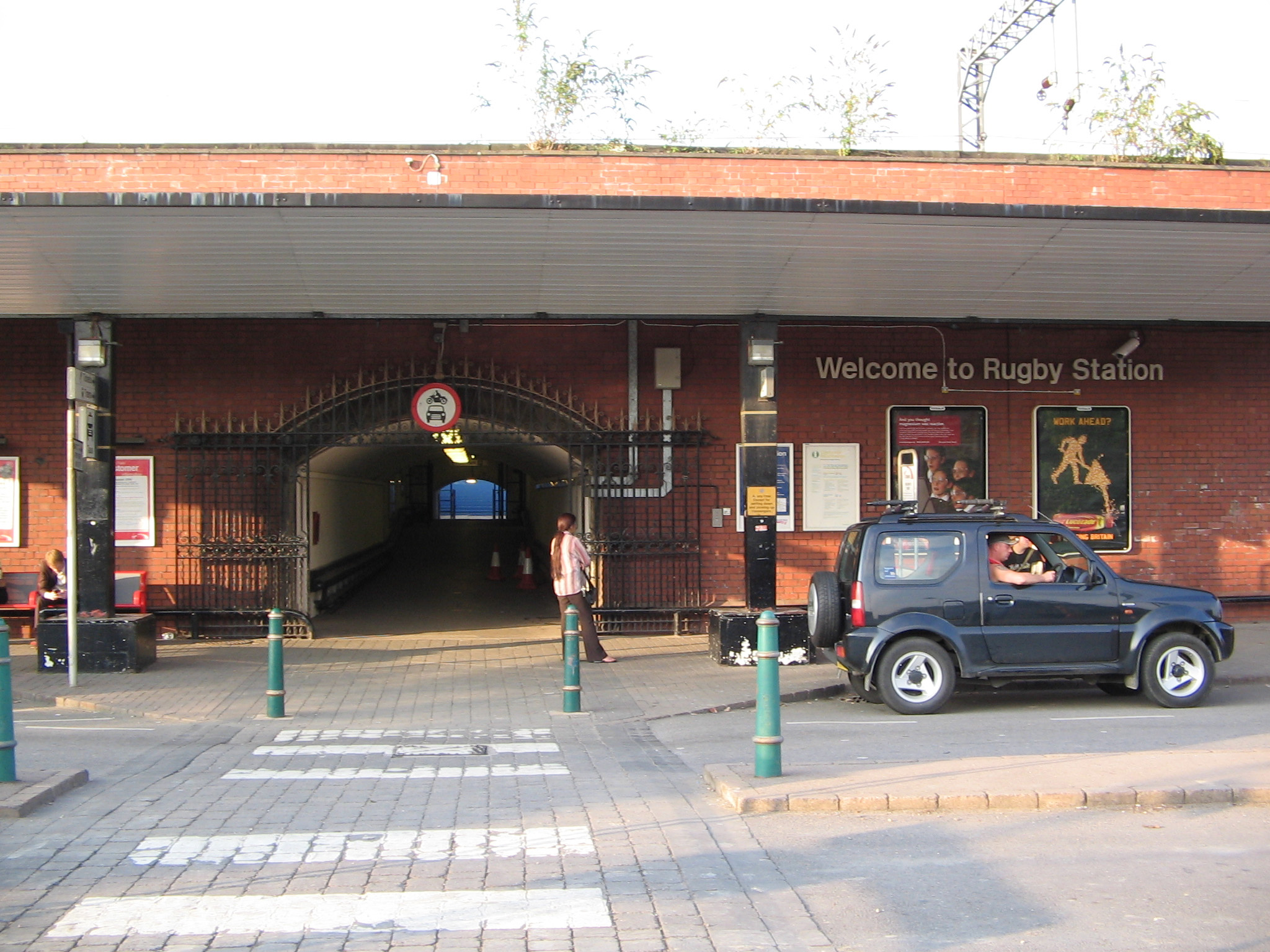
Rugby station entrance in 2006, before redevelopment.

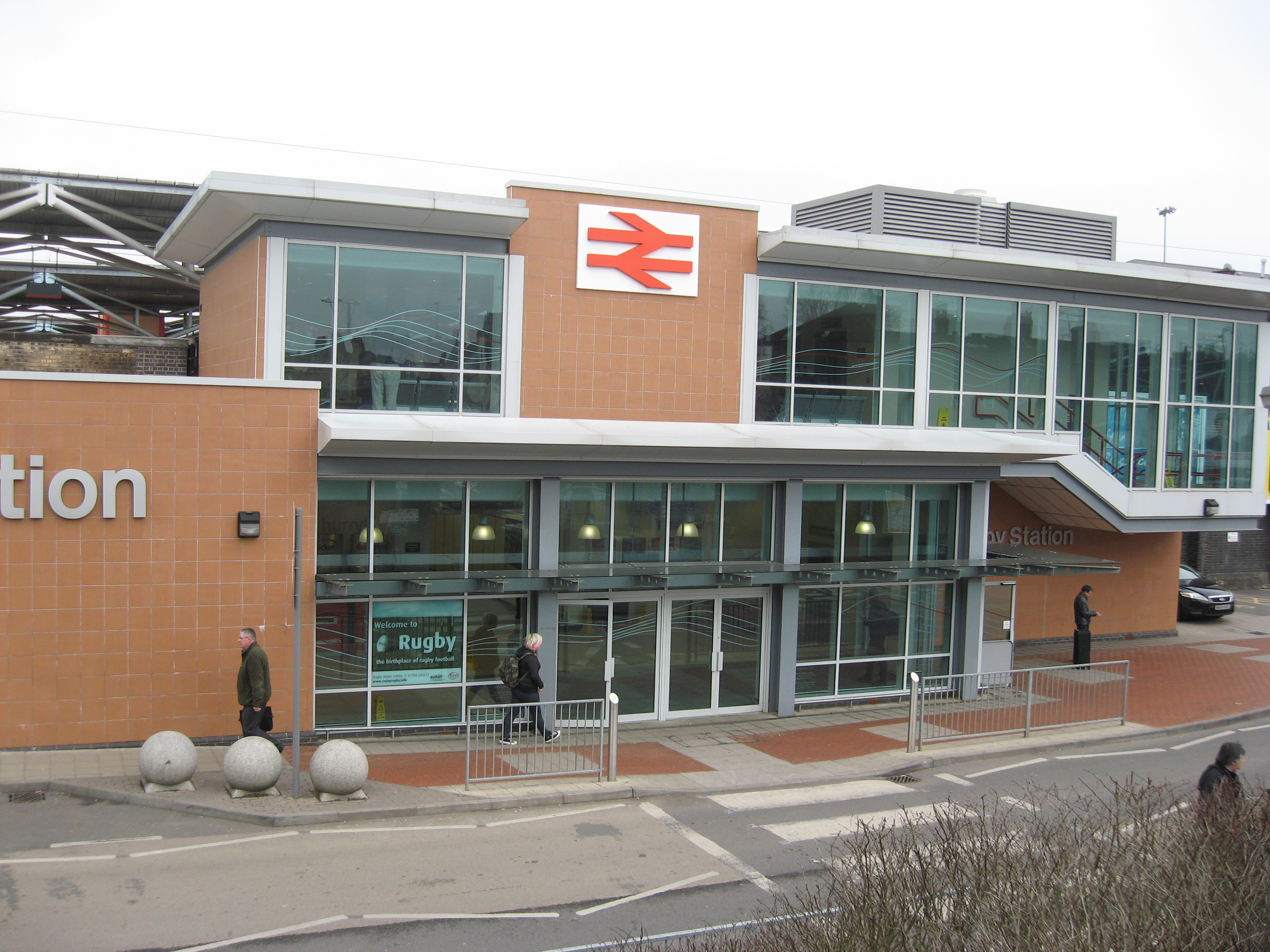
View of the new station entrance in 2011.

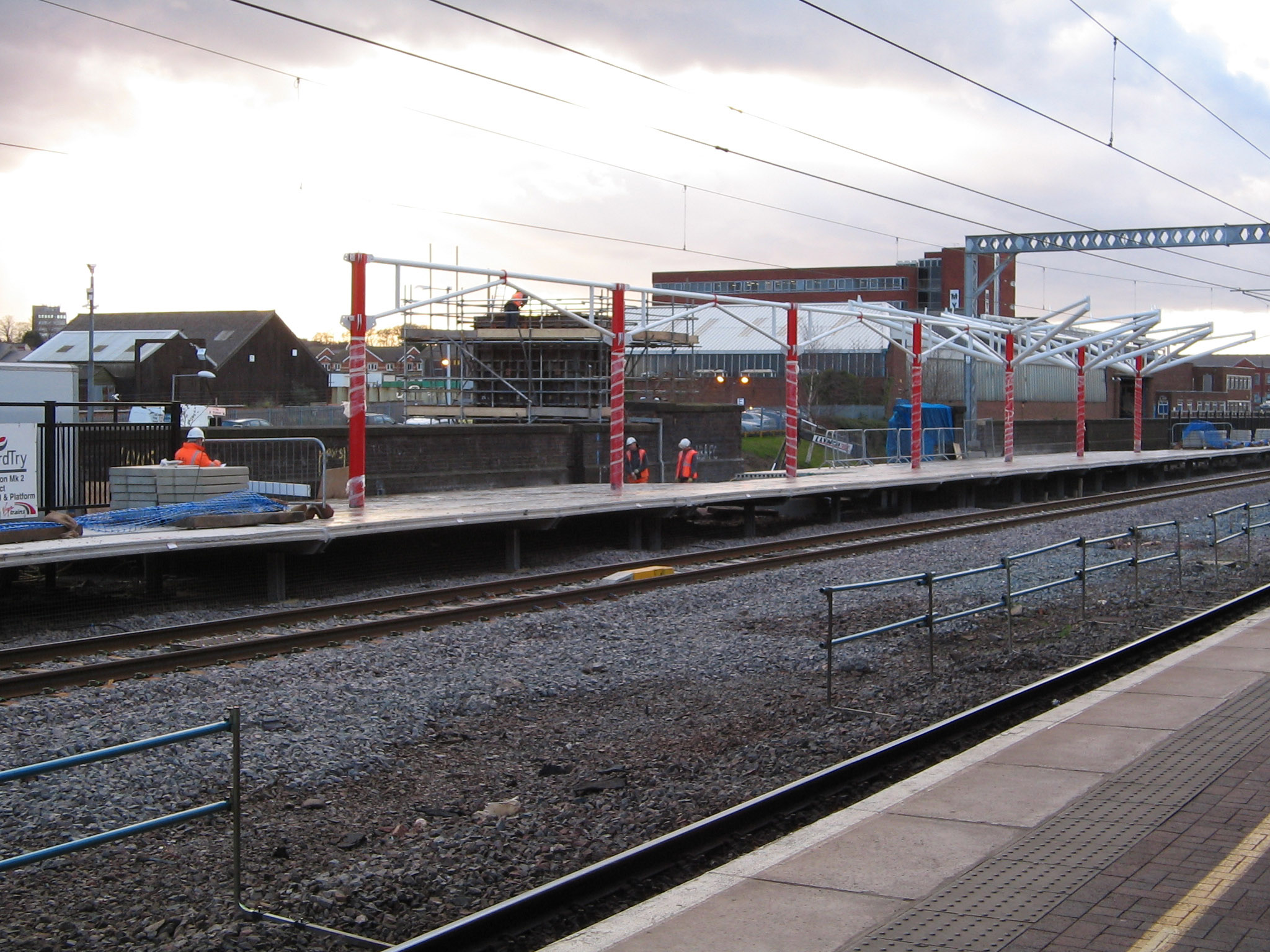
The new platform 1 under construction in March 2007

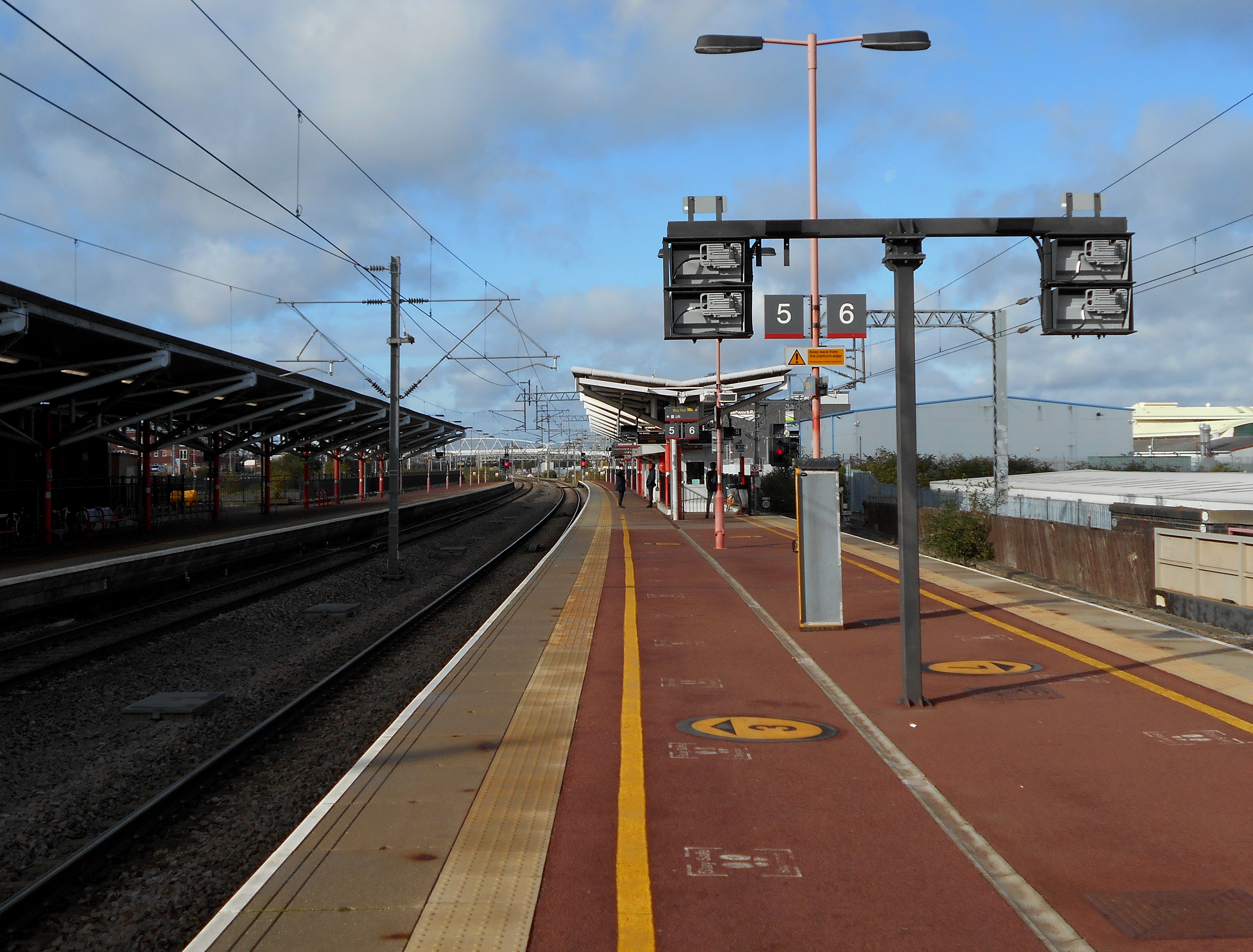
The new north island platform added in the 2008 upgrade. Containing platforms 5 and 6.

=== Signalling ===
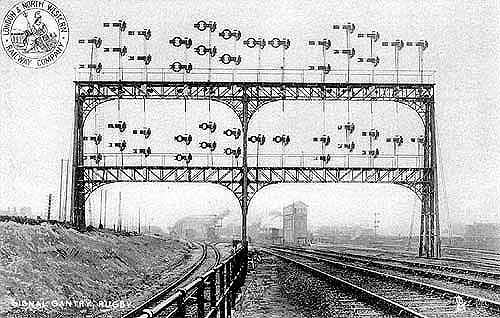
The "Rugby Bedstead" signalling gantry in 1895, prior to the construction of the Great Central viaduct

Rugby once had the largest concentration of mechanical signalling in the world and was home to one of the most impressive signal gantries in Britain. Situated to the south of the station and erected in 1895, it spanned three tracks and carried forty-four semaphore arms. Every arm was duplicated due to sighting difficulties that resulted from the Great Central Railway's 'Birdcage' bridge crossing the WCML behind the gantry's location. The gantry acquired the nickname of "the Rugby Bedstead" on account of its appearance.

In 1939, the London, Midland and Scottish Railway resignalled the Rugby area with colour light signals, although the mechanical signal boxes were retained. The famous signal gantry became redundant, following which it was divided up into smaller pieces to form a number of smaller structures for re-use elsewhere.

SGE was awarded a contract to resignal the Rugby area in preparation for electrification. Rugby Power Signal Box (PSB) opened in 1964. It is located east of the station, on the south (Down) side of the railway. The whole station area, together with part of the WCML stretching as far south as Castlethorpe, was controlled from this new box. It was equipped with an 'NX' (entrance-exit) panel. In 1991, Rugby PSB took over control of the Northampton area using Solid State Interlocking (SSI). Rugby PSB closed in May 2012 when control of Northampton was transferred to Rugby SCC.

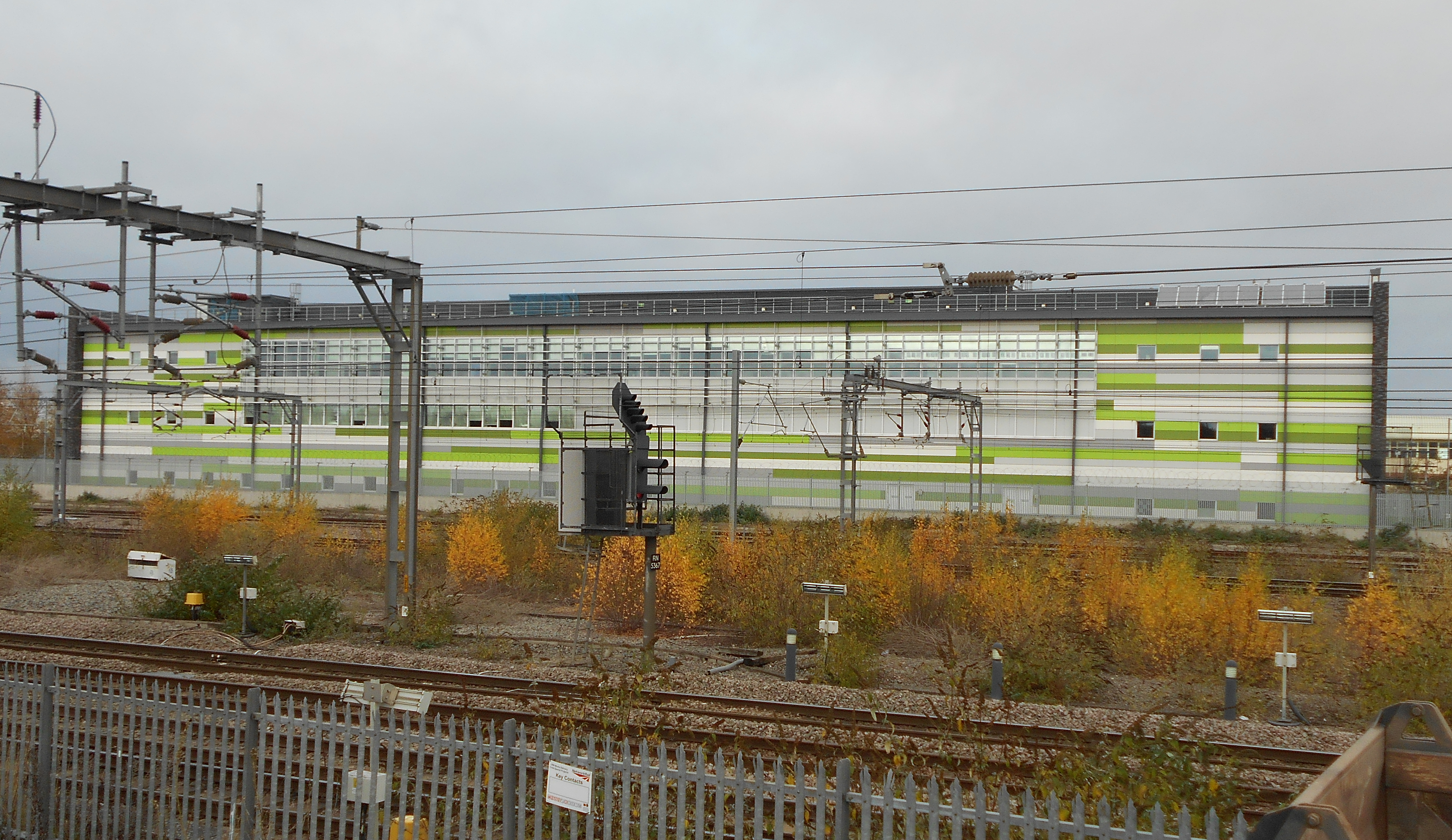
Rugby Rail Operating Centre

Rugby Signalling Control Centre (SCC), located north-west of the station, opened in 2004. Initially, its area of control was limited to a portion of the WCML between Kings Langley and Linslade Tunnel. The current area of control is Kings Langley, Hertfordshire to Armitage in Staffordshire. Area of control also includes small portions of branch lines around Nuneaton; these include the Coventry-Nuneaton (from Three Spires to Nuneaton) and part of the Arley/Hinckley lines (Arley Tunnel to Padge Hall). In March 2016, the WCML South Rail Operating Centre (ROC) was opened at Rugby – this will supervise the signalling on the entire southern end of the WCML and associated branch routes.

=== Motive power depots ===
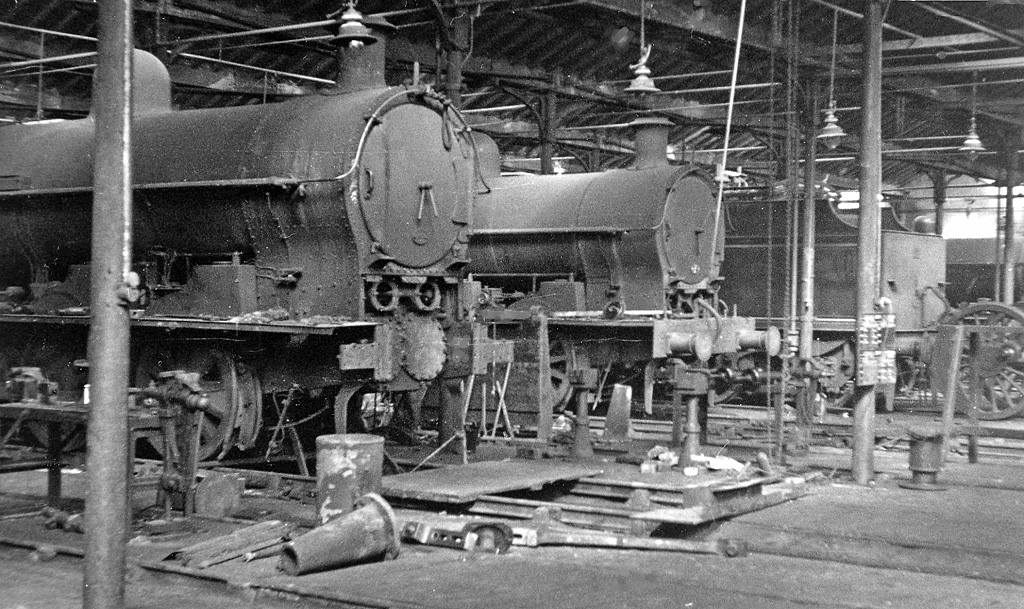
Inside the repair shops at Rugby depot in 1953

A shed for three locomotives was opened here in 1838 by the London and Birmingham Railway and another in 1847. These were demolished to make way for two larger sheds in 1852, one for the use of the Northern Division locomotives and one by the Southern Division. The LNWR replaced these with a single 12-road shed in 1876, which was closed in 1965, but used for stabling diesel shunters. An adjoining 12-road shed was opened in 1886, but was closed and demolished by British Railways in 1960.

== Railway lines served ==
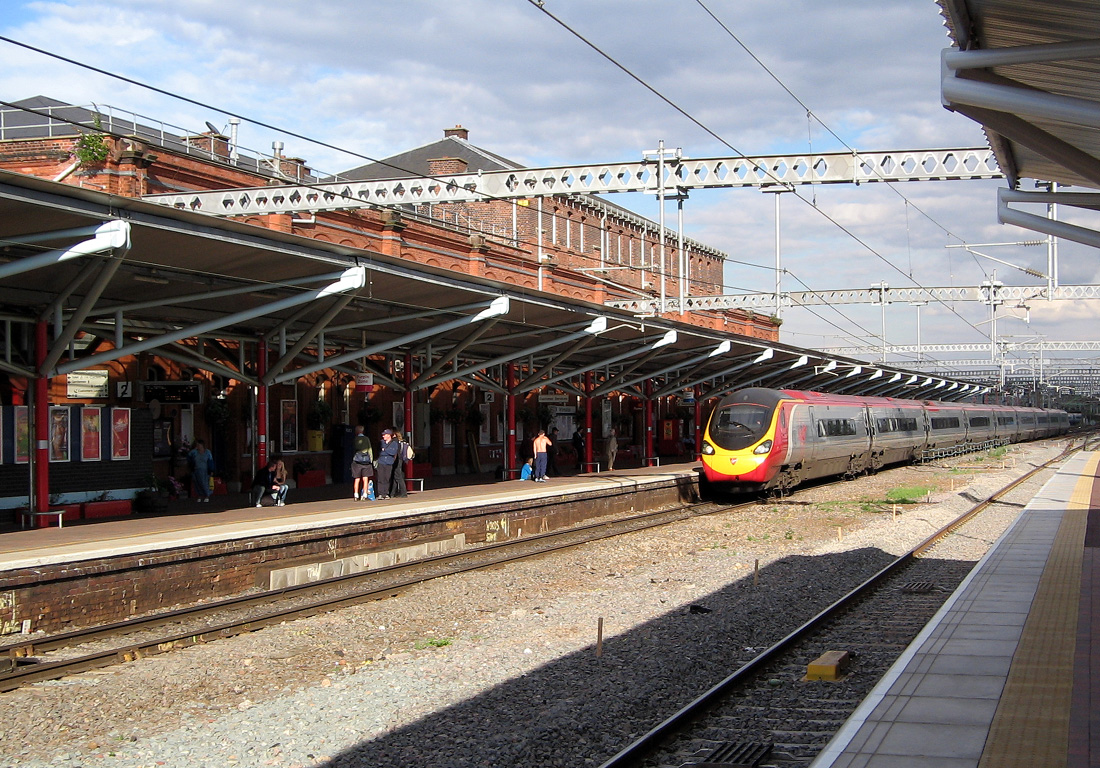
A Virgin Trains Class 390 Pendolino at platform 2, August 2007.

=== West Coast Main Line ===
Since the 1960s, Rugby is served only by the West Coast Main Line. However, as the WCML divides here on either side of the station, it provides an interchange between the routes and consequently many trains stop here.

In the chainage notation traditionally used on the railway, the station is 82 miles 4 chains (82.05 mi; 132.05 km) from Euston.

==== Hillmorton Junction ====
To the south-east of the station, the original London and Birmingham Railway (L&BR) line (opened 1838), which runs directly to London, is joined at a grade separated junction near Hillmorton by the Northampton loop (opened 1881) which runs to Northampton before rejoining the line to London at Hanslope Junction. This junction is 81 miles 28 chains (81.35 mi; 130.92 km) from Euston.

==== Trent Valley Junction ====
To the north-west of the station the WCML diverges again between the original London and Birmingham line, now referred to as the Birmingham Loop, which runs westwards to Coventry and Birmingham New Street, and the Trent Valley line (opened 1847) which diverges at a flyover junction north-westwards towards Stafford and North West England and Scotland. It is 83 miles 18 chains (83.23 mi; 133.94 km) from London Euston.

=== Closed lines ===
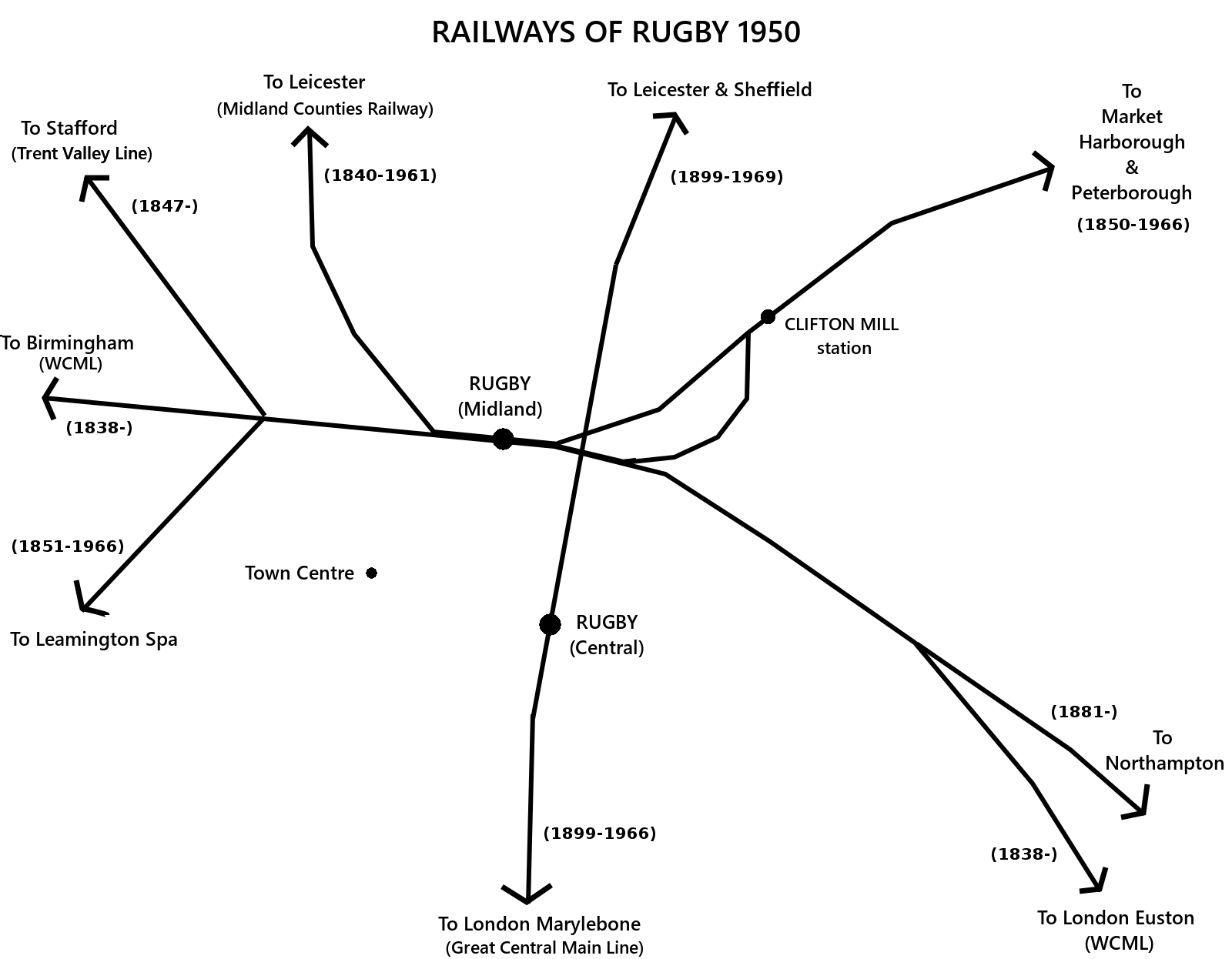
Railways of Rugby in 1950

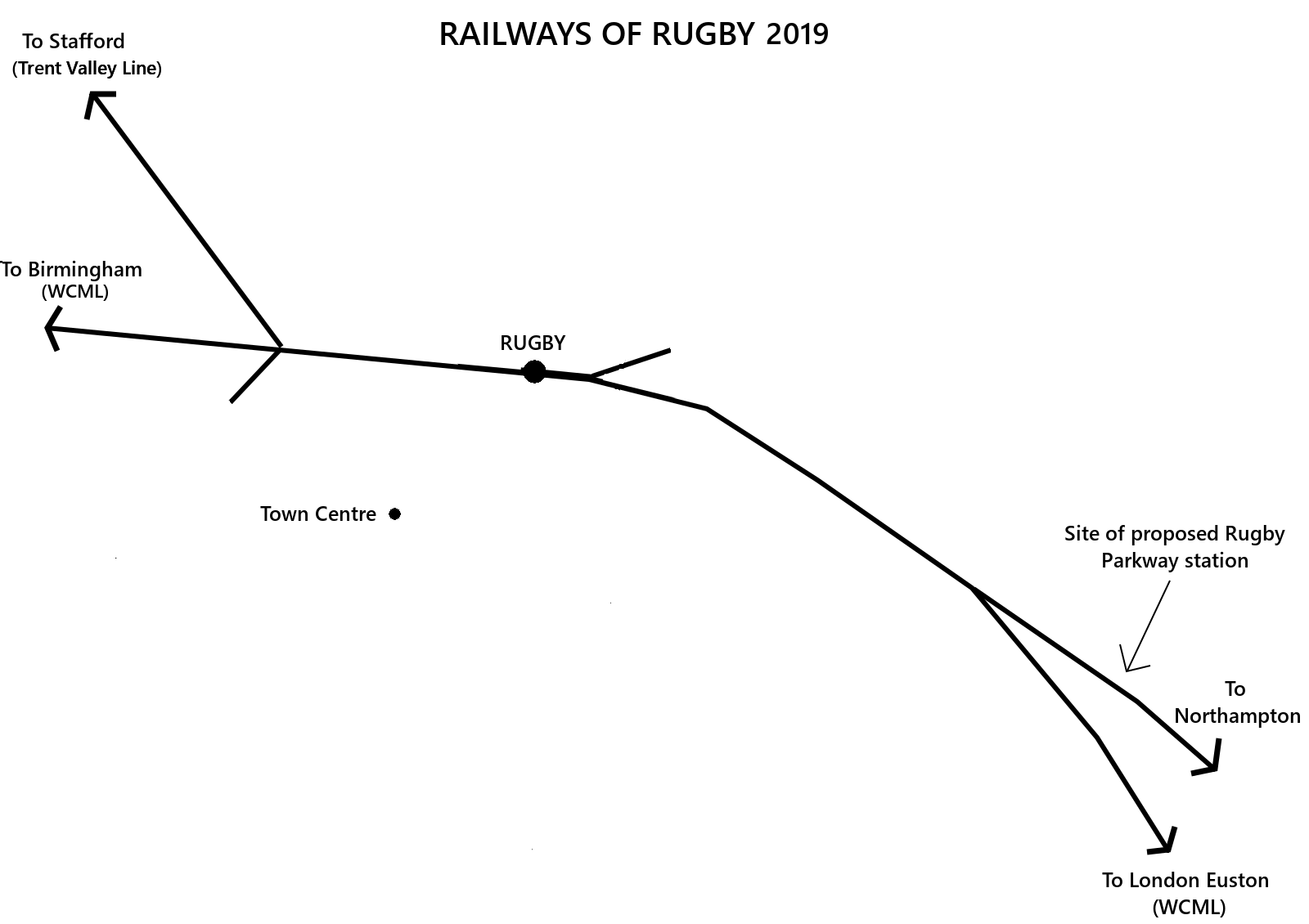
Railways of Rugby in 2019

Until the 1960s, Rugby station served several other railway lines, which were closed mostly as part of the Beeching Axe. At one time, railway lines diverged from Rugby station in seven different directions. The closed lines were:

- The Midland Counties Railway (later Midland Railway) line to Leicester and the East Midlands which opened in 1840. In the mid-19th century this was an important main line, as the junction at Rugby provided the Midland Railway with its only link to London. Nearly all rail traffic between London and the north passed through Rugby, making it one of the most important railway junctions in the country. Increasing congestion at Rugby meant that Midland Railway opened its route from Leicester to London in the late 1860s. The Leicester to Rugby line lost its earlier importance, and became little more than a country branch line, it continued to operate as such for nearly a century until it was closed on 30 December 1961. A remaining relic of this line is the disused viaduct across the Avon valley, which is a local landmark.
- The Rugby and Stamford Railway which was a secondary cross-country line owned by the London and North Western Railway which ran from Rugby to Peterborough via Market Harborough. The line was opened on 29 April 1850. It originally ran to Stamford where it joined the Midland Railway's Syston and Peterborough Railway. But later on, in order to gain a more direct route, the LNWR gained permission to build a line from Seaton to the Northampton and Peterborough Railway near Wansford, part of which survives as the Nene Valley Railway. Traffic was never heavy, and Doctor Beeching viewed it as an unnecessary duplication of the Birmingham to Peterborough Line and it was closed on 6 June 1966.
- The Rugby to Leamington Line which was a country branch line to Leamington Spa which was opened on 1 March 1851. Local passenger services were withdrawn in 1959, and the line closed as a through route in 1966.

The Great Central Main Line (GCML) also ran through the town and had its own station at Rugby Central, but as this was built by a rival company, it never had any connection to the other railways in Rugby. It was opened in 1899 and closed between 1966 and 1969.

== Layout ==
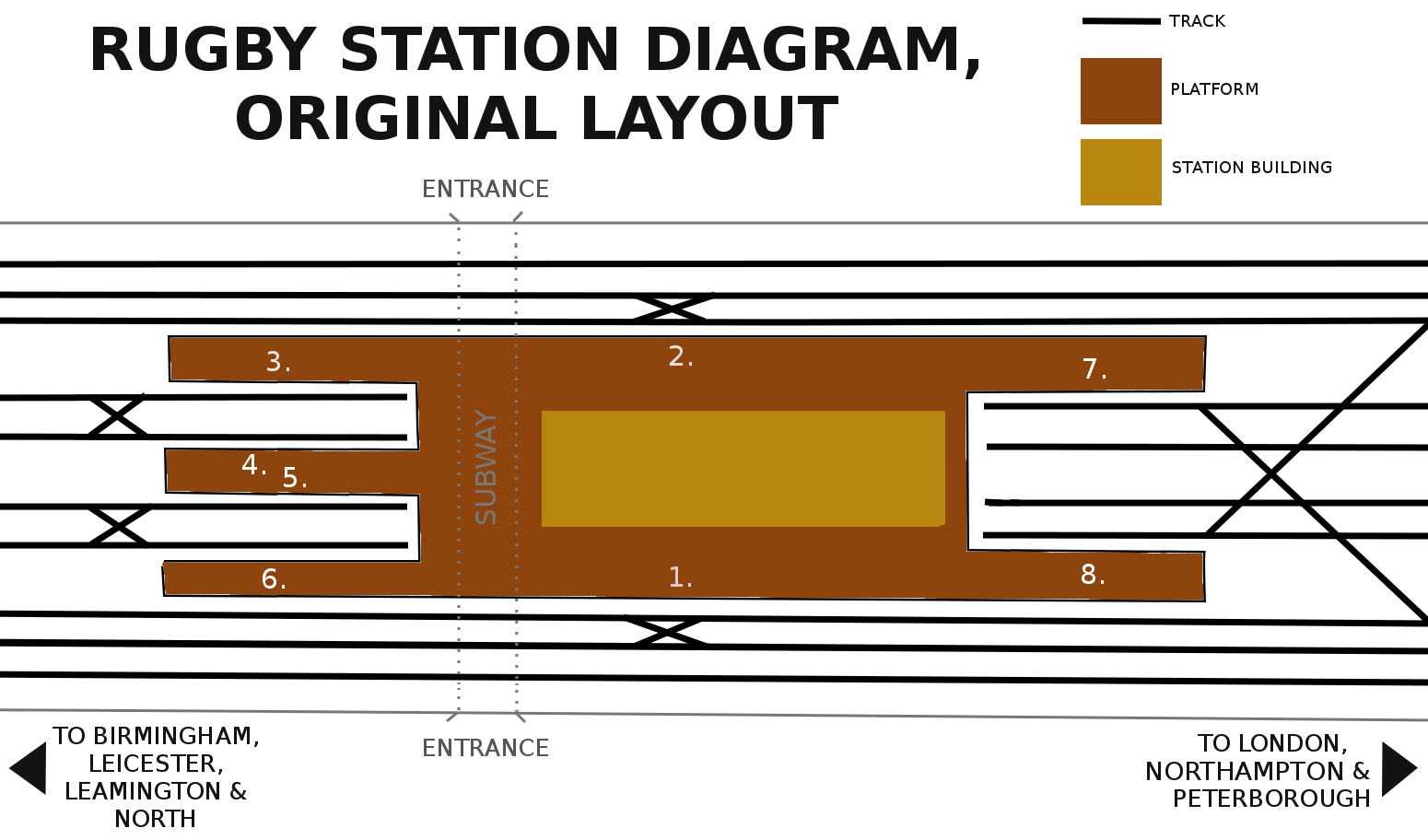
Simplified diagram of the original station layout

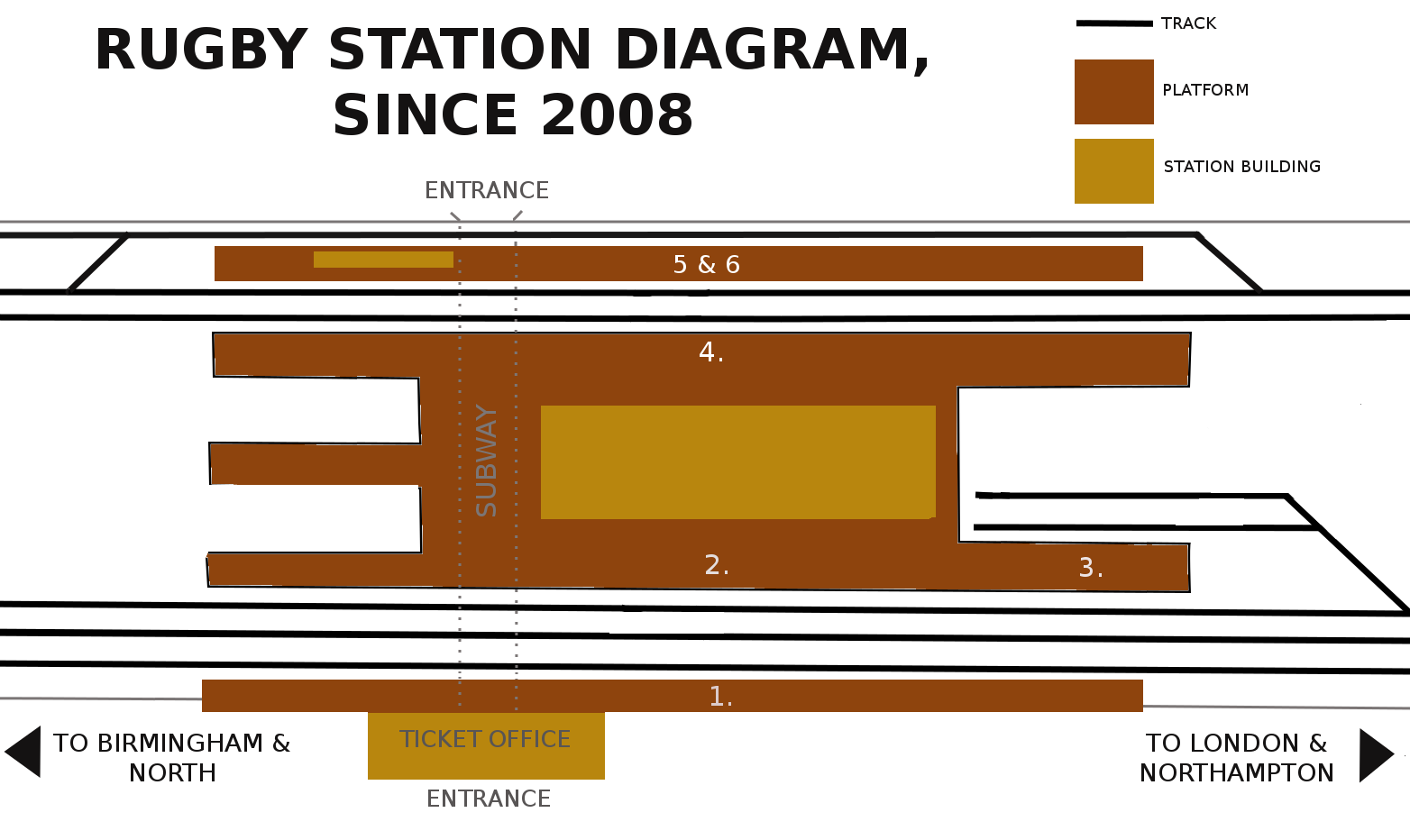
Simplified diagram of the station layout since 2008

Rugby station has a total of six platforms, consisting of five through platforms (platforms 1, 2, 4, 5 & 6) and one east facing bay platform (platform 3) which is not in regular use. Platform 1 on the south of the station is a side platform, to its north are two island platforms which contain platforms 2,3 & 4 and 5 & 6 respectively. The platforms are above street level on a brick embankment, and are accessed from a subway via ramps, stairs or lifts, except platform 1 which is accessed by stairs and a lift directly from the ticket office. The main entrance and ticket office is on the south side facing the town centre, with a secondary subway entrance to the north.

Between 1885 and 2008, Rugby station consisted of one large island platform, containing only two through platforms which are now platforms 2 and 4. The through platforms were long enough however to allow two trains to call at them at the same time, a feature enabled by scissors crossovers at the midway point of the platforms; this practice was abandoned in the 1960s when the crossovers were removed. At each end were bay platforms, four west facing, and two east facing: The bay platforms historically accommodated the various terminating branch line and local services, but had become largely redundant when these services were withdrawn. All but one of the bay platforms were removed during the 2008 remodelling, and the extra through platforms were added.

== Services ==
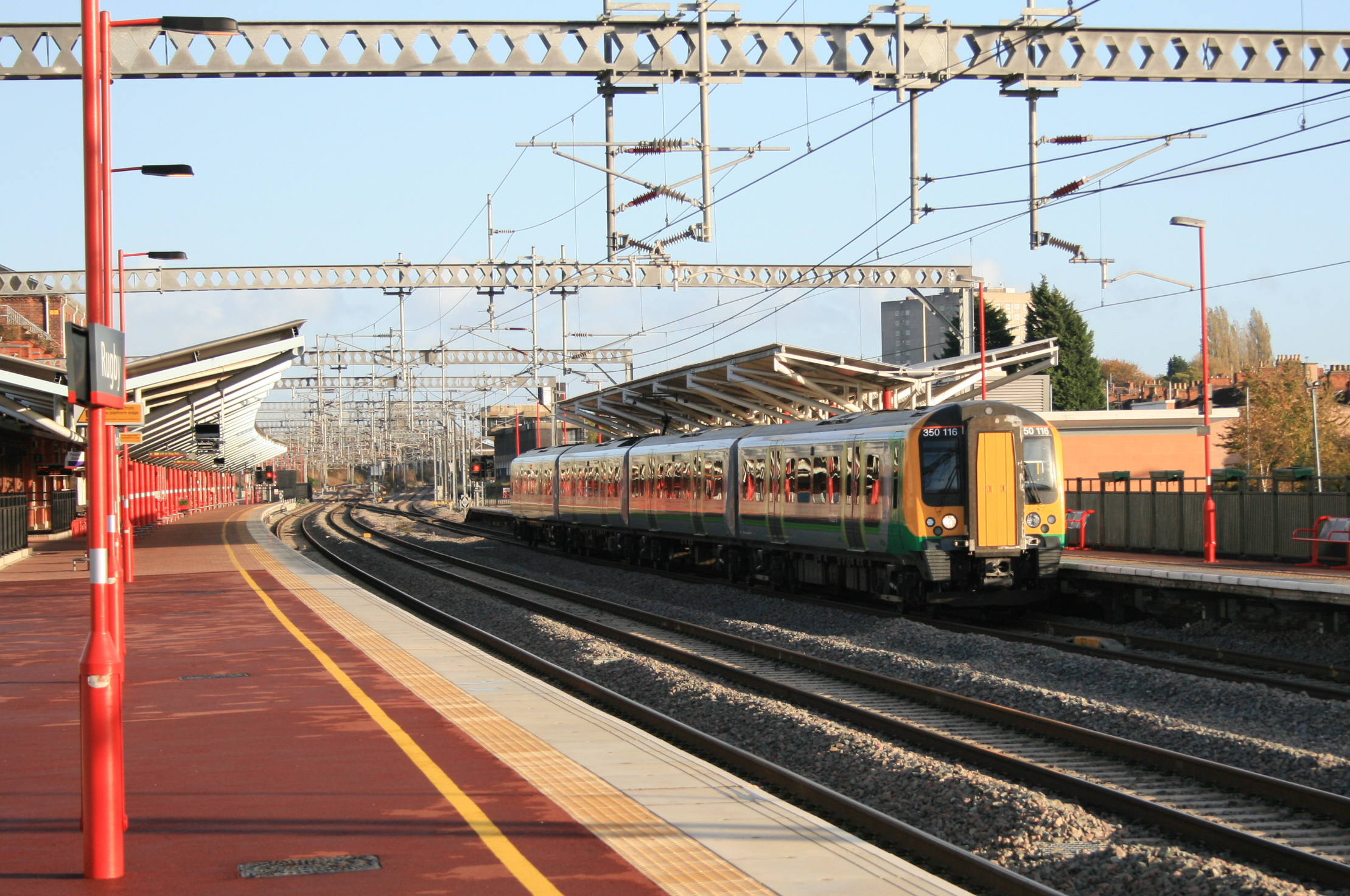
A London Midland Class 350 stops at platform 1 on a service to Birmingham New Street

Rugby is served by two train operating companies; the standard off-peak weekday service in trains per hour/day (tph/tpd) is:

Avanti West Coast:

- 2 tph to London Euston
- 1 tph to Manchester Piccadilly, via Stoke-on-Trent
- 1 tph to Birmingham New Street, via Coventry

London Northwestern Railway:

- 3 tph to London Euston: two semi-fast via Northampton and one express service calling at Milton Keynes Central only
- 2 tph to Birmingham New Street, both semi-fast
- 1 tph to Crewe, via Nuneaton and Stafford.

Preceding station	National Rail	Following station
Coventry towards	London Northwestern Railway London–Birmingham	Long Buckby towards
Nuneaton towards	London Northwestern Railway London–Crewe	Milton Keynes Central towards
Coventry	Avanti West Coast; London – West Midlands – North West/Scotland	Milton Keynes Central
Stoke-on-Trent	Avanti West Coast; London – Manchester	Milton Keynes Central
	Historical railways	
Terminus	London and North Western Railway; Northampton loop	Kilsby and Crick; Line open, station closed
Brinklow; Line open, station closed	London and North Western Railway; Trent Valley line	Terminus
Brandon and Wolston; Line open, station closed	London and North Western Railway; Birmingham–London Line	Welton; Line open, station closed
	Disused railways	
Terminus	London and North Western Railway; Rugby to Peterborough Line	Clifton Mill; Line and station closed
Dunchurch; Line and station closed	London and North Western Railway; Rugby–Leamington line	Terminus
Ullesthorpe; Line and station closed	Midland Railway; Rugby to Leicester Line	Terminus

== Onward connections ==
Bus route 4, operated by Stagecoach Midlands, connects the railway station with Rugby town centre and the suburbs of Cawston and Bilton.

Bus route D1 and D2, operated by Stagecoach Midlands, previously connected the railway station with Rugby town centre, now replaced on this section by services 1 and 2, which connects with buses D1 and D2 to the suburbs of Barby, Braunston, Brownsover, DIRFT, Hillmorton, and Kilsby. The service then continues onto serve the nearby town of Daventry.

== See also ==
- Rugby Central railway station - former Great Central station serving Rugby.
- Rugby Parkway railway station - proposed new station which would be on the town's outskirts.
- Clifton Mill railway station - former station serving the adjacent village of Clifton-upon-Dunsmore
- Midland Counties Railway Viaduct, Rugby - disused railway viaduct.
- Rugby Locomotive Testing Station - former locomotive testing facility at Rugby.
