= Rugby and Stamford Railway =

Railway in England

The Rugby and Stamford Railway was an early railway in England built in 1850. The London and Birmingham Railway had already built a branch from Blisworth to serve Northampton and extend to Peterborough. The success of this, the Northampton and Peterborough Railway encouraged the directors to look for other ventures. They decided upon a branch from Rugby to Stamford which would link up with other new railways in the east of the country.

At approximately the same time the Midland Railway was building its Syston to Peterborough line which opened in 1848. It was therefore necessary to share its line between Luffenham and Stamford.

== Authorisation ==
The "Act to empower the London and Birmingham Railway Company to make a Branch Railway from Rugby to the Syston and Peterborough Railway near Stamford.", the Rugby and Stamford Railway Act 1846 (9 & 10 Vict. c. lxvii). was passed in 1846, a month before the line became part of the London and North Western Railway.

== Construction ==
Like the earlier branch it was built as a single line which could be doubled at a later date if needed. From Rugby the line followed the valley of the Warwickshire Avon and then the Welland Valley. Although it eased construction with few earthworks it involved a number of river crossings. During the construction the major contractor became bankrupt in 1848. Joseph Firbank, railway contractor, lost much of his savings as a result.

== Opening and expansion ==
The section from Rugby to Market Harborough, opened in 1850. Originally single track, it was doubled at the end of 1878.

Market Harborough to Rockingham opened a month late, but the remainder to Luffenham was not completed until a year later. The line was not doubled throughout until 1878.

The increased traffic into Rugby proved a problem, particularly when the Northampton Loop Line opened in 1881. The LNWR therefore applied to build a flyover at the south end of the station and a single track viaduct of some 30 arches which would bring the line in from Clifton Mill. These were completed in 1885.

At Market Harborough the Midland Railway arrived in 1857 on its way to Bedford and London. The Midland arranged to share the station but traffic increased to such a degree that a flyover was planned over the LNWR lines north of the station. However instead the two companies build a new joint station which opened in 1884 although not fully completed until February 1886. Passenger traffic was not great, with only a few trains each way on weekdays and two on Sundays.

The Rugby to Stamford Line in relation to Midland lines around 1850

In order to gain a more direct route the LNWR gained permission to build a line from Seaton to the Northampton and Peterborough Railway line near Wansford. This opened for freight on 2 July 1879, and passengers on 1 November. Although the line from Seaton to Luffenham was now of little importance, it remained double and Morcott station was built as a double line station. The section was not singled until 1907.

== Closure ==
Despite offering a more direct route between the Midlands and East Anglia, the line was closed on 6 June 1966 as part of the Beeching Axe in favour of the longer Birmingham to Peterborough Line which served larger population centres.

In January 2019, Campaign for Better Transport released a report identifying the line which was listed as Priority 2 for reopening. Priority 2 is for those lines which require further development or a change in circumstances (such as housing developments).
