= Frisby on the Wreake =

Village in Leicestershire, England

Coordinates: 52°45′09″N 0°58′18″W

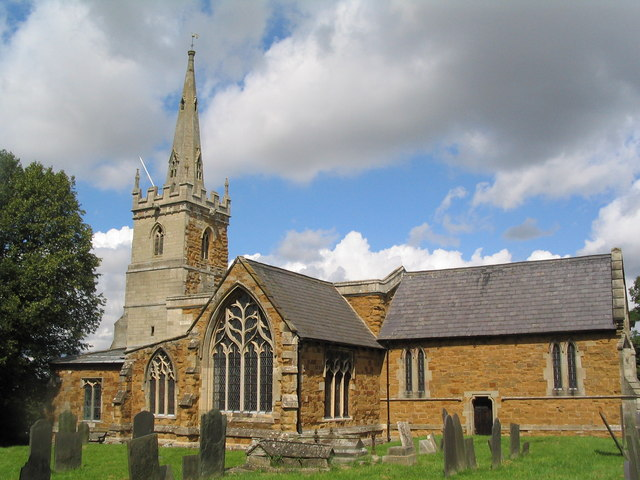
- Parish church of St Thomas of Canterbury

- Location within Leicestershire
- Population: 557 (2011 Census)
- OS grid reference: SK6917
- Civil parish: Frisby on the Wreake
- District: Melton
- Shire county: Leicestershire
- Region: East Midlands
- Country: England
- Sovereign state: United Kingdom
- Post town: Melton Mowbray
- Postcode district: LE14
- Dialling code: 01664
- Police: Leicestershire
- Fire: Leicestershire
- Ambulance: East Midlands
- UK Parliament: Melton and Syston
- Website: Frisby on the Wreake Parish Council

Frisby on the Wreake is a village and civil parish on the River Wreake about 3.5 miles (5.6 km) west of Melton Mowbray, Leicestershire, England. The 2011 Census recorded the parish's population as 557.

The toponym "Frisby" was applied by Danish invaders in the 9th or 10th century. It refers to the farm or settlement of the Frisians. The "on the Wreake" suffix was added later to distinguish the village from another Frisby, near Billesdon, about 8 miles (13 km) to the southeast. "Wreake" refers to the River Wreake. The name of the river originates from a Danish word referring to the meandering nature of the river.

== Parish church ==
The oldest parts of the Church of England parish church of St Thomas of Canterbury are 12th-century. The building includes much 14th- and 15th-century work. The north aisle was rebuilt about 1820. The chancel was rebuilt when the church was restored in 1848. The church is now a Grade I listed building.

The west tower has three bells. Hugh I Watts of Leicester cast the treble bell in about 1600. William Noone of Nottingham cast the second and tenor bells in 1711.

In the 18th century the parish priest agreed to marry couples from some distance away. This was at a time when wedding ceremonies were closely controlled by the church and state. It is likely that many of the marriages of couples from elsewhere went against the consent of close relatives. The number of weddings at the parish church increased substantially compared to earlier and later times and the village earned the later nickname of the Gretna Green of the Midlands.

== Economic and social history ==
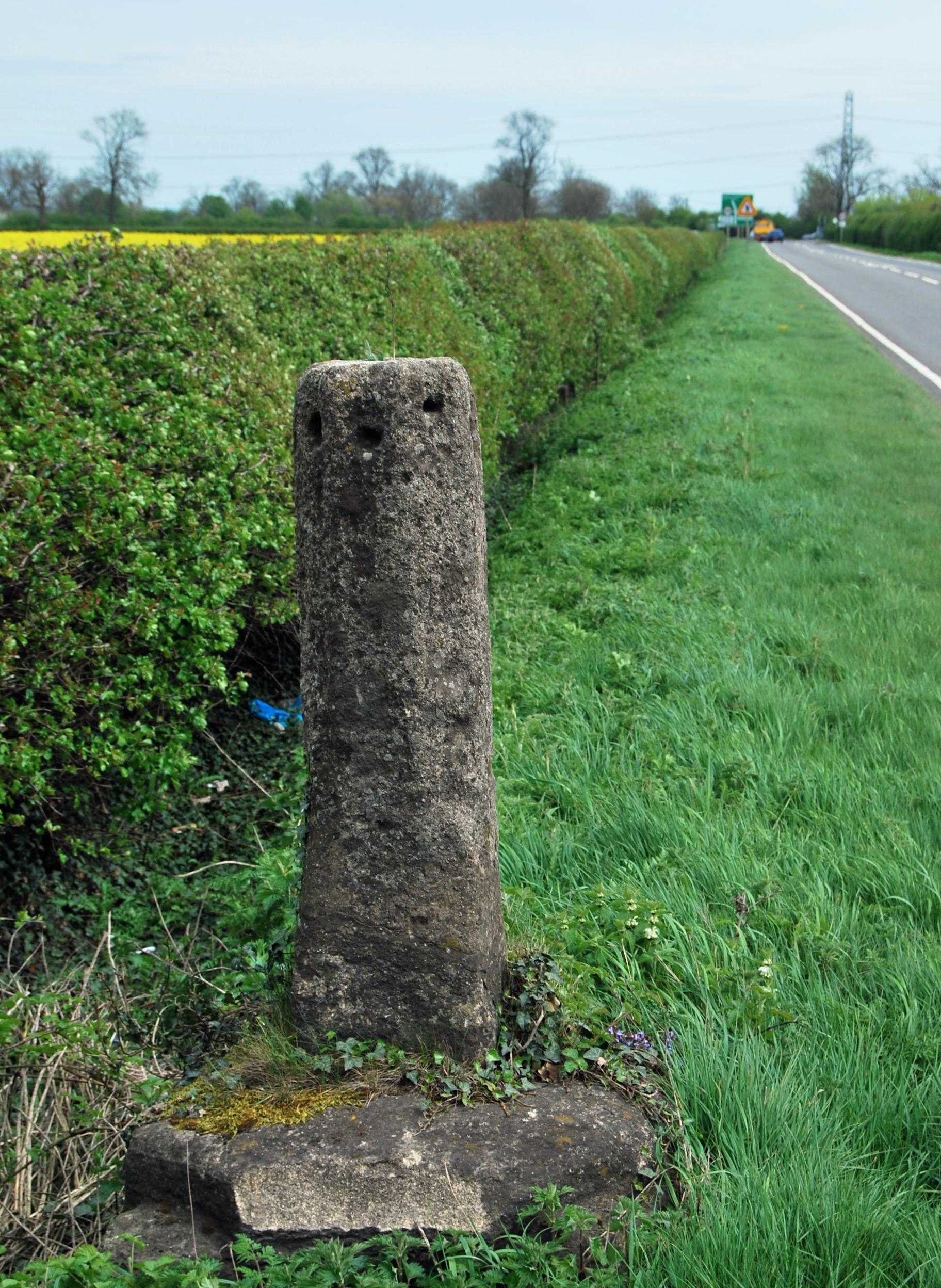
14th-century Stump Cross south of the village

When the church was founded the main road from Leicester to Melton Mowbray passed through the village, entering from Hoby with Rotherby to the south and leaving by Kirby Bellars to the north. The village was bypassed to the south when the turnpike, now the primary route A607, was built in the 18th century. The new road passes a medieval wayside cross that may have been a preaching place. The base and broken shaft of the cross survive. There is another medieval stone cross in the village centre.

Frisby Mill was on the River Wreake and was working at the time of the Domesday Book in 1086. The mill was rebuilt several times, but fell into disuse at the beginning of the 20th century. The channels to divert the river water to the mill may still be seen in the fields to the northwest of the village.

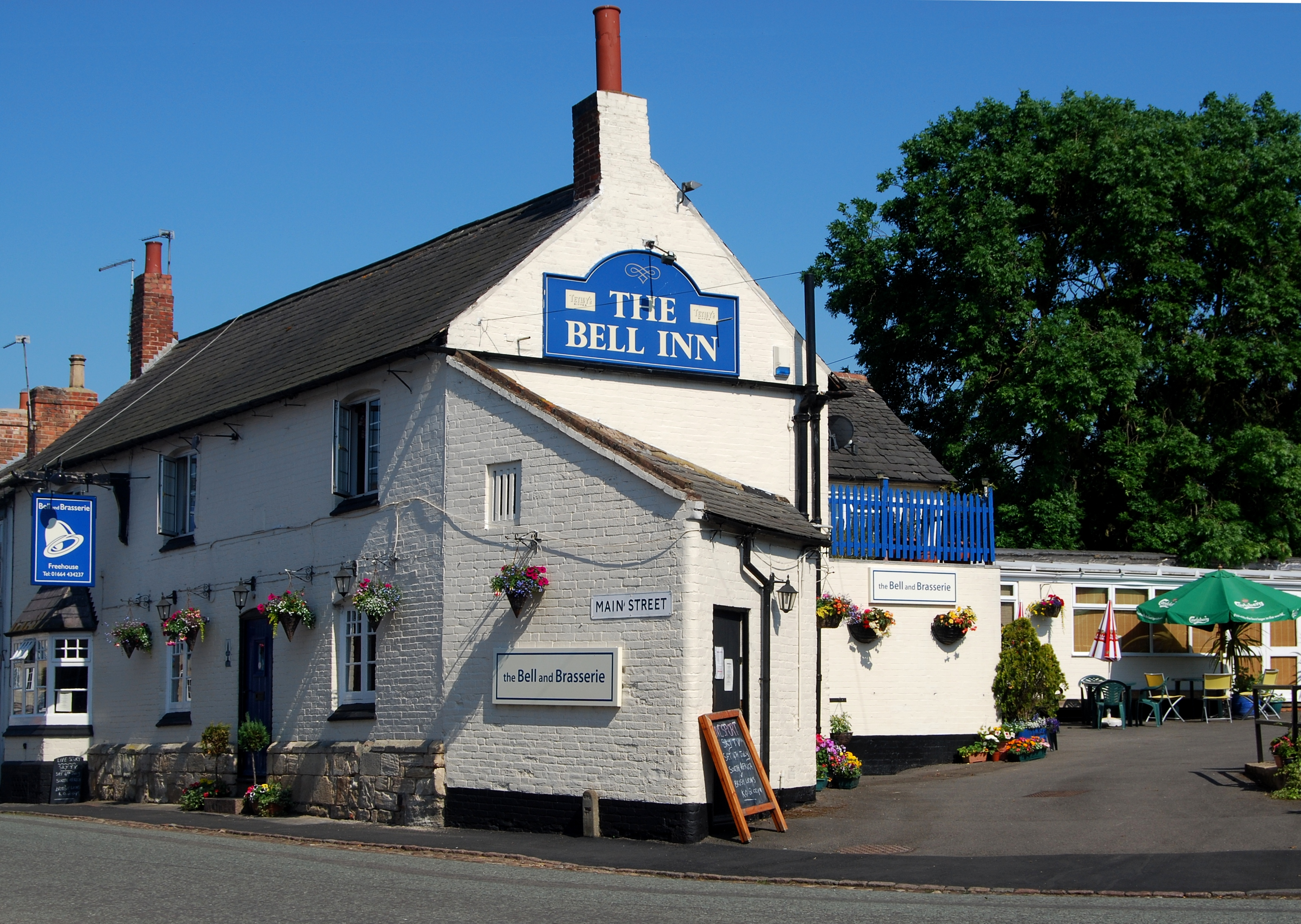
Blue Bell Inn

Farming was organised on an open field system. Each landholder was awarded a series of strips in the three common fields. This ensured everyone shared the best and worst land. The remains of the strips can still be seen, more than a thousand years since they were first created. When the great fields were enclosed in the late 18th century, landowners were compensated by the award of blocks of land. The poorer owners often sold their holdings, which were usually very small, and consolidation into the present farms took place. The existing farms in the outlying fields were all created at this time.

Originally the village lands were all worked from homes in the village itself. The remaining farmhouses in the village are older than those outside the village. As in many other Leicestershire villages, the new, consolidated blocks of land were planted with hawthorn hedges, Thus, most hedges between the Frisby fields are not more than 250 years old. Those by the roadside and along the parish boundary are likely to be much older, as these were the lines that marked the medieval limits of the parish and its fields.

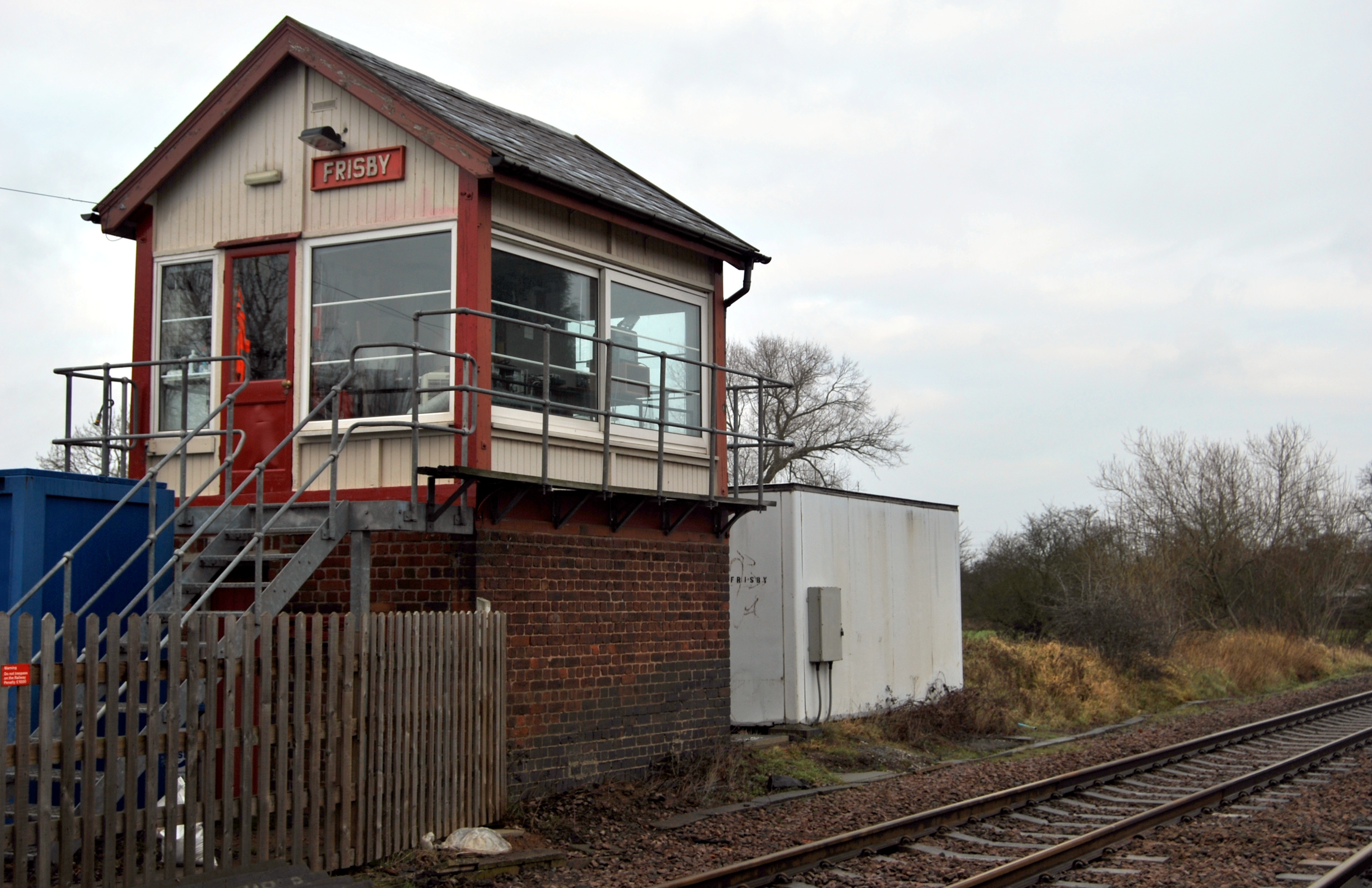
Frisby railway signal box

Transport was improved by the opening of the Melton Mowbray Navigation in the 1790s and the Syston and Peterborough Railway in 1847. A condition of building the railway was that it should take over the canal. Frisby railway station served the parish until British Railways closed it in the year 1961.

== Bibliography ==
- Pevsner, Nikolaus; Williamson, Elizabeth; Brandwood, Geoffrey (1984) [1960]. Leicestershire and Rutland. The Buildings of England (2nd ed.). Harmondsworth: Penguin Books. p. 155.
