= Asfordby railway station =

Former railway station in Leicestershire, England

Coordinates: 52.75671°N 0.94495°W

Asfordby
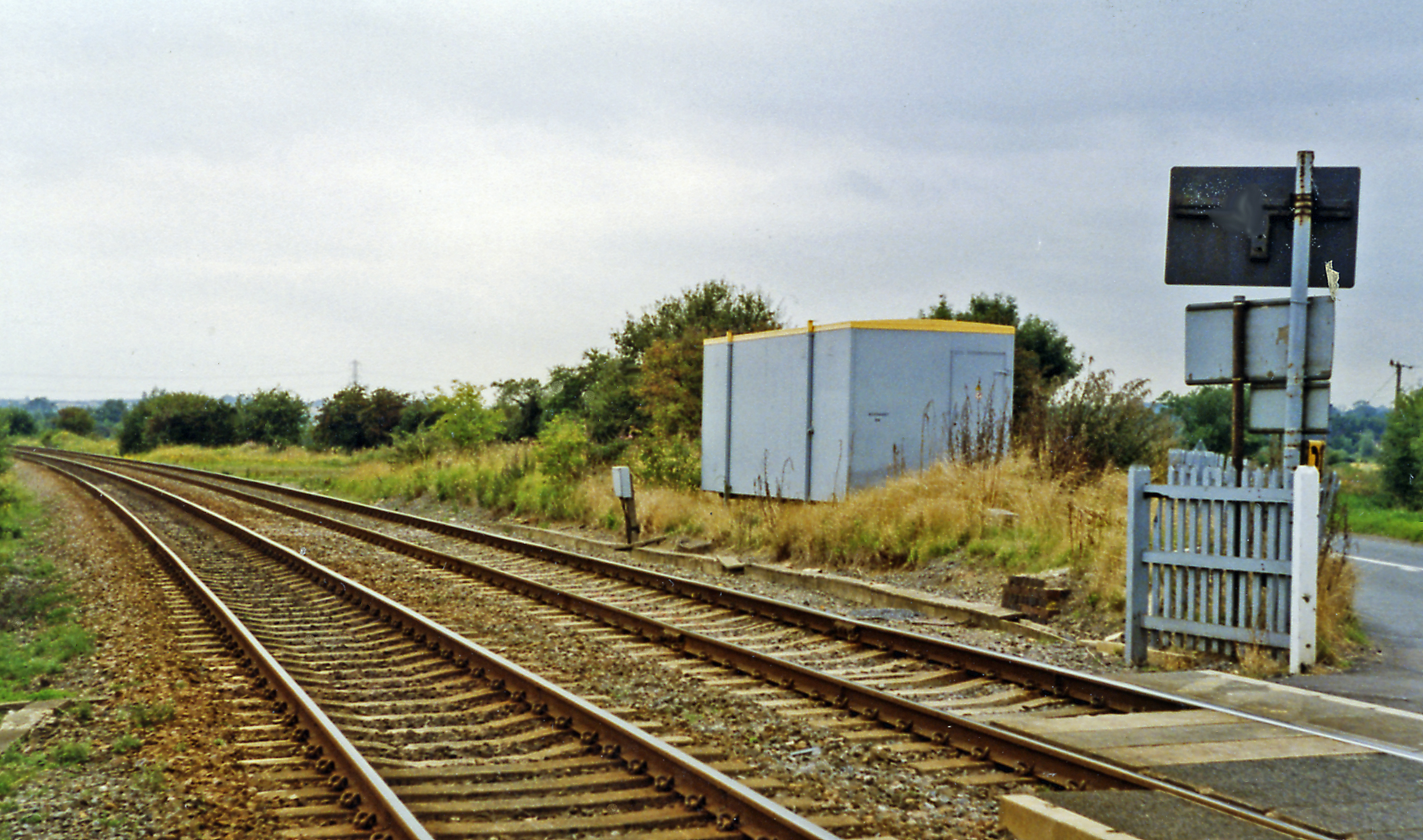
- Site of the station in 1993

General information
- Location: Asfordby, Leicestershire; England
- Grid reference: SK713182
- Platforms: 2

Other information
- Status: Disused

History
- Pre-grouping: Midland Railway
- Post-grouping: London, Midland and Scottish Railway; London Midland Region of British Railways

Key dates
- 1 September 1846: Opened as Kirby
- 1 December 1857: Renamed Asfordby (late Kirby)
- 1 May 1903: Renamed Asfordby
- 2 April 1951: Station closed for passengers
- 1964: station closed for goods
Location

Asfordby railway station was a station serving the villages of Asfordby and Kirby Bellars in Leicestershire. The station was situated at a level crossing on the road between the two villages. It opened in 1846 and was originally named Kirby, but had been renamed Asfordby by 1863. It closed to passengers in 1951 but remained in use for goods until 1964.

== History ==
It was opened by the Midland Railway on the Syston and Peterborough Railway. The station building were designed by the architects William Parsons and Sancton Wood. The contractors Norman and Grimson undertook to build it for £744 8s 6d. and it was remarkably similar to the station at Rearsby.

It became part of the London, Midland and Scottish Railway during the Grouping of 1923. The station then passed on to the London Midland Region of British Railways on nationalisation in 1948. It was then closed by the British Railways Board.

=== Stationmasters ===
- Charles Allen 1847 - 1892
- H. Ellis 1892 - 1899 (formerly station master at Moira)
- William Williamson 1899 - 1928
- W. Stephenson 1933 - 1935 (afterwards station master at Annesley)
- Walter Wilson 1935
- H.E. Harrison ca. 1945

== The site today ==
Trains still pass the site on the Birmingham to Peterborough line.

Former Services

Preceding station	Disused railways	Following station
Frisby	Midland Railway; Birmingham to Peterborough Line	Melton Mowbray
