= Frisby railway station =

Former railway station in Leicestershire, England

Coordinates: 52.7541°N 0.9742°W

Frisby
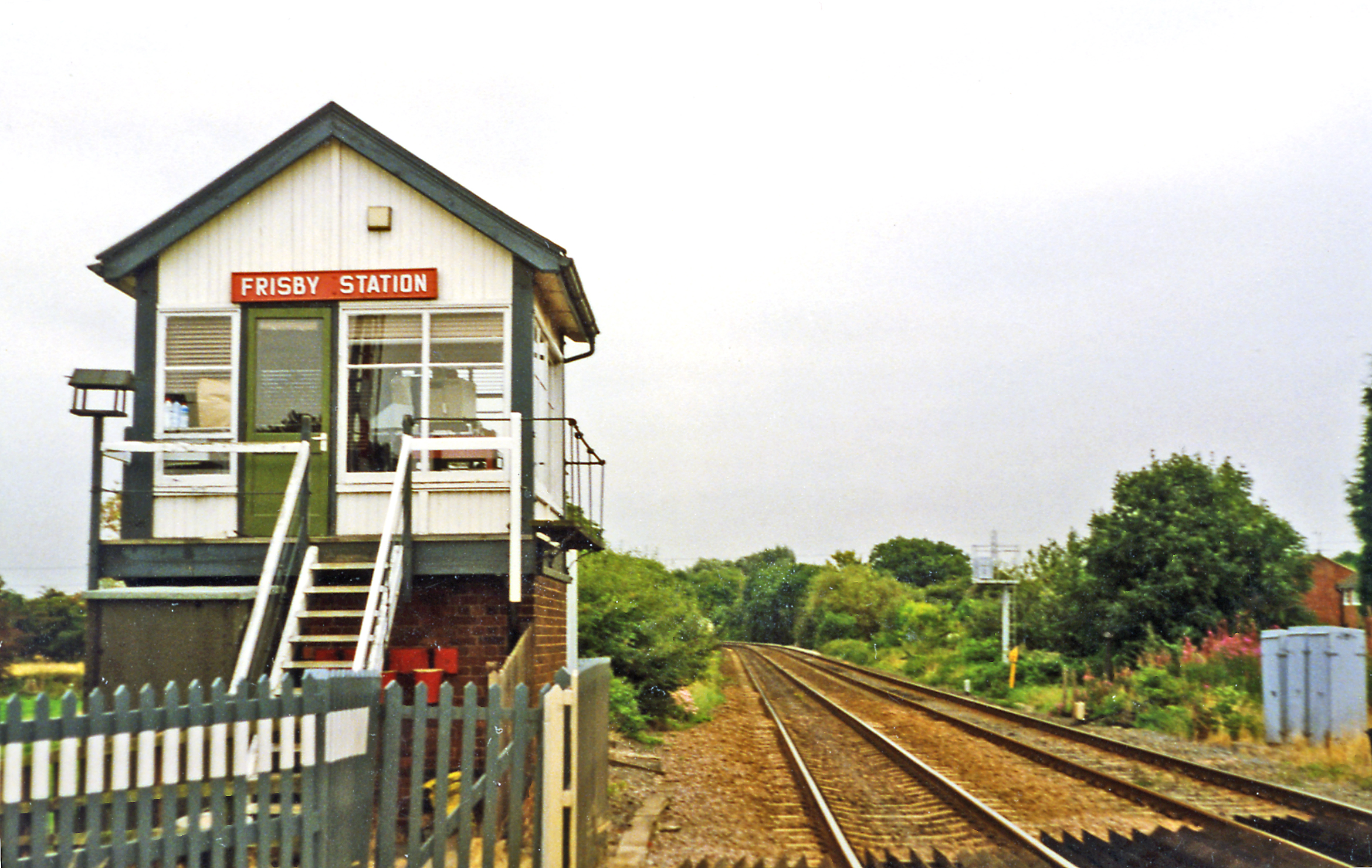
- Signal box at the former station in 1993

General information
- Location: Frisby on the Wreake, Leicestershire; England
- Grid reference: SK693178
- Platforms: 2

Other information
- Status: Disused

History
- Pre-grouping: Midland Railway
- Post-grouping: London, Midland and Scottish Railway; London Midland Region of British Railways

Key dates
- 1 January 1847: Opened
- 3 July 1961: Closed
Location

Frisby railway station was a former station serving the village of Frisby on the Wreake in Leicestershire. The station was situated at a level crossing on the road to Hoby.

== History ==
The station opened in 1847 on the Syston and Peterborough Railway, but until 1849 it only had a service on Melton market days. It closed in 1961. There were no goods facilities at the station.

=== Stationmasters ===
The station masters house was one of the smallest and cheapest on the line between Syston and Melton Mowbray. It was little more than a gatehouse and this may have contributed to the relatively fast turn-over of station masters.

- John Thomson ca. 1851 - 1874
- J. Lambert 1874 - 1875 (afterwards station master at Wigston South)
- G.W. Fenton 1875 - 1876
- W. Greenfield 1876 - 1887
- S. North 1877 - 1879
- F. Gilley 1879
- J. Wyldes 1879
- Edward Richardson 1880 - 1881 (afterwards station master at Great Glen)
- R. Shipway 1881 - 1888
- Charles Taylor 1888 - 1892
- J.J. Cook 1892 - 1893
- R. Higgins 1893 - 1898
- Harry Scott 1898 – ca. 1911
- H.J. Roberts ca. 1914
- A. Alexander (afterwards station master at Manton)
Former Services

Preceding station	Disused railways	Following station
Brooksby	Midland Railway; Leicester to Peterborough	Asfordby
