= River Wreake =

River in Leicestershire, England

Coordinates: 52.7090°N 1.1198°W

- River Wreake outside Syston, Leicestershire

- The River Wreake has both its source and mouth in Leicestershire.

Location
- Country: England
- Region: Leicestershire

Physical characteristics
- Source
  - location: Stapleford
- Mouth
  - location: River Soar
- Length: ~25km (15.5mi)

The River Wreake is a river in Leicestershire, England. It is a tributary of the River Soar. The river between Stapleford Park and Melton Mowbray is known as the River Eye and becomes the Wreake below Melton Mowbray.

It flows southwest, passing through Melton Mowbray, Asfordby, Frisby on the Wreake, Brooksby, Thrussington and Ratcliffe on the Wreake, before meeting the Soar near Syston. In its upper reaches it is called the River Eye and it becomes the Wreake below Melton Mowbray, near Sysonby Lodge.

The name Wreake was given by Danish invaders of Leicestershire, who are thought to have navigated the River Trent, then the River Soar and finally the Wreake as they entered the district. Their word Wreake indicated that the river followed a tortuous, twisting and turning course.

The river was canalised in the late 18th century, after the Melton Mowbray Navigation Act 1791 (31 Geo. 3. c. 77) was passed, though after the building of the Syston and Peterborough Railway in the mid 19th century, the canal was disused and fell into ruin. Many of the diversions made to the river in order to make the canal navigable are still visible, especially in the neighbourhood of Hoby with Rotherby, Frisby on the Wreake, Kirby Bellars and Asfordby.

The Wreake is graded by the Environment Agency as "B" quality, which is excellent for a Midlands river. Biotic index surveys report mayfly and stonefly nymphs, caddis fly larvae, dragonfly and damselfly nymphs and crayfish. Among the fish are Perch, Chubb, Pike, Minnows, Miller's Thumb, and Trout. Otters are starting to repopulate the Wreake in its quieter stretches.
