= Oakham Canal =

Disused canal in England

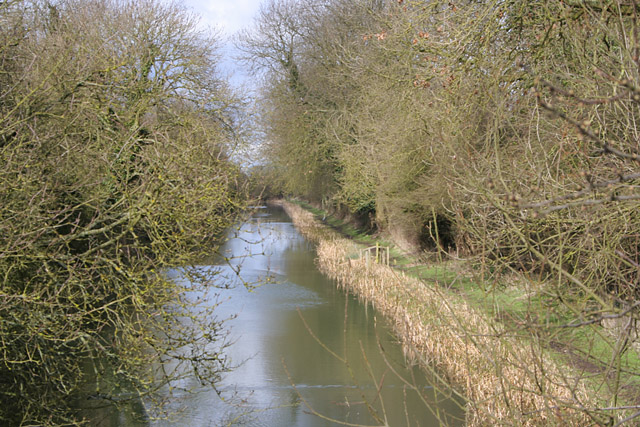
- The canal looking north from Burley Road bridge
- Interactive map of Oakham Canal

Specifications
- Maximum boat length: 72 ft 0 in (21.95 m)
- Maximum boat beam: 14 ft 2 in (4.32 m)
- Locks: 19
- Status: Mostly infilled

History
- Original owner: Oakham Canal Company
- Principal engineer: Christopher Staveley
- Date of act: 1793
- Date completed: 1802
- Date closed: 1847

Geography
- Start point: Oakham
- End point: Melton Mowbray
- Connects to: Melton Mowbray Navigation

The Oakham Canal ran from Oakham, Rutland to Melton Mowbray, Leicestershire in the East Midlands of England. It opened in 1802, but it was never a financial success, and it suffered from the lack of an adequate water supply. It closed after 45 years, when it was bought by the Midland Railway to allow the Syston and Peterborough Railway to be built, partly along its course. Most of it is infilled, although much of its route can still be seen in the landscape, and there are short sections which still hold water.

== Course ==
From Melton Mowbray, the canal headed broadly eastwards, following the valley of the River Eye, keeping to its north and east bank to reach Wyfordby. The railway, when it was built, followed a much more direct route due east to Wyfordby. The railway then follows the course of the canal much more closely, although there are only a few small sections where it actually followed the canal bed. Near the junction with the dismantled railway branch to Bourne, the canal swept northwards in a loop, to cross the River Eye, near which was Saxby wharf. The canal then headed southwards to the east of Stapleford Park, where there was another wharf, on its way to Station Cottages, which was the location of Whissendine railway station, although it was some distance from the village.

Beyond the station, the railway abandoned the course of the canal, heading south-eastwards to Ashwell and then south to Oakham. The canal headed east to Edmondthorpe and on to Market Overton, where a third wharf served the village. Proceeding southwards, it reaches the road to Cottesmore, where there was another wharf, about 1 mile (1.6 km) from Cottesmore. Just before the road, the course is crossed by the former mineral railway to Cottesmore Iron Mines sidings, now occupied by the Rutland Railway Museum. The canal passes the site of the former Ashwell Prison, near which some of it is still in water, to arrive at Oakham, where there was a terminal wharf.

== History ==
Oakham Canal Act 1793
- Act of Parliament
- Parliament of Great Britain
- Long title: An Act for making and maintaining a Navigable Cut or Canal from the Melton Mowbray Navigation in the County of Leicester, to Oakham in the County of Rutland.
- Citation: 33 Geo. 3. c. 103
- Territorial extent: Great Britain

Dates
- Royal assent: 7 May 1793
- Commencement: 7 May 1793 (Note: The Acts of Parliament (Commencement) Act 1793.)
Other legislation
Amended by	Oakham Canal Act 1800
Relates to	Midland Railway Act 1846

Status: Amended

Text of statute as originally enacted

Plans for a canal to Oakham were first conceived in 1785, by some of those proposing the Melton Mowbray Navigation. William Jessop was asked to survey a route, but it was Robert Whitworth who carried out the work. His route was generally further west than the adopted route, passing to the west of Stapleford, and then through Leesthorpe and Ashwell to reach Oakham. It would have required 13 locks. Meetings were held in December 1785 to consider proposals for an extension onwards from Oakham to Stamford. In 1791, the Leicester Navigation and the Melton Mowbray line were authorised by acts of Parliament, and new plans for the Oakham line were drawn up, following a meeting in April 1792. The earls of Harborough and Winchilsea supported the navigation, and a bill was put before Parliament in September. In November, some £51,000 was promised towards the costs of construction, and on 7 May 1793, the Oakham Canal Act 1793 (33 Geo. 3. c. 103) was granted, authorising the Oakham Canal Company to raise £56,000 by issuing shares, with an additional £20,000 if required.

The new route had been surveyed by William Jessop, but the detailed design was done by Christopher Staveley junior, who then became the engineer. Staveley was also involved with the Leicester and the Melton navigations, but was sacked by the Melton company in 1795. A report into his work on the Melton line and the Oakham line was critical of him, and he resigned as engineer, to be replaced in late 1797 by William Dunn of Sheffield. Although Dunn had no previous experience at building canals, he saw the work through to a successful conclusion. Costs overran, and it was difficult to raise money due to the uncertainties caused by the French Revolutionary Wars, but a second act of Parliament was obtained in 1800, allowing the company to raise another £30,000. The final cost of construction was between £65,000 and £70,000. The canal opened in stages, reaching Saxby in November 1800, and was declared to be completed in June 1802, but the water supply was inadequate, and it was probably not usable to Oakham until January 1803.

== Operation ==
The canal connected Oakham to the Melton Mowbray Navigation, and hence to the River Soar and the national waterways system. The route passed through 19 broad locks along its 15.5-mile (24.9 km) route, rising 126 feet (38 m) between Melton and Oakham. No aqueducts or tunnels were required, and there was just one large embankment near Edmondthorpe. The main cargos carried were coal, which moved up the canal, and agricultural produce, which was carried away to market. The enterprise was not a financial success. Those who had invested in the canal had paid £130 for their shares, and the first dividend of £2 was paid in 1814. £3 was paid the following year, but there were no further payments until 1827, when another £2 was paid. The most profitable year was 1840, when the dividend reached £5.

The idea of a link from Oakham to Stamford, 11 miles (18 km) due east, was revived in 1809, with plans for a 7-mile (11 km) link from Stamford to the River Nene at Peterborough. The River Welland could be reached by a canal from Stamford at the time, and the plans also included a link from the Welland near Market Deeping northwards to the South Forty-Foot Drain, from where Boston could be reached. A bill for this, together with one for a rival scheme to link Stamford to the Grand Junction Canal, which also included a link to the South Forty-Foot Drain, were put before Parliament in 1811, but neither met with any success. The idea was revived in 1815 and 1828, but no further action was taken.

== Closure ==
Railway companies arrived in the area in November 1844. When they were approached by the Midland Railway company about proposals for the Syston and Peterborough Railway, the shareholders recommended negotiation. A deal was struck with the Midland Railway paying £26,000 (£2.37 million in 2025) plus 200 fully paid up £40 shares (£3,650 per share in 2025) for the canal. In 1844, the canal had carried 31,182 tons of goods upwards, with around 72 per cent of it being coal, and grain and wool amounting to 4,120 tons had passed down the canal. The lack of a proper water supply had resulted in the canal being closed for nearly five months during the dry summer of 1844. The construction of the railway was authorised by Parliament and a second act to allow the canal to be sold and abandoned, the Midland Railway (Oakham Canal Purchase) Act 1846 (9 & 10 Vict. c. cclv), was obtained on 27 July 1846.

The railway from Syston to Melton Mowbray opened on 1 September 1846. It would be more than a year before the sale of the canal was finally completed, on 29 October 1847, but just six months after that, the line from Melton Mowbray to Oakham opened on 1 May 1848. The final purchase price enabled a final distribution of £44.35 (£4,100 in Jan 2025) to be made on each of the original shares.

== Website ==
The website of the Melton and Oakham Waterways Society gives some of the history of both the Oakham Canal and the Melton Navigation.

== Points of interest ==
Point	Coordinates (Links to map resources)	OS Grid Ref	Notes
Melton Mowbray basin	52.7623°N 0.8866°W	SK752188	Start of canal
Saxby Wharf	52.7661°N 0.7845°W	SK821194	
Bourne Railway bridge	52.7618°N 0.7819°W	SK822189	
Station Cottages	52.7411°N 0.7639°W	SK835166	railway and canal diverge
Teign Road bridge	52.7436°N 0.7264°W	SK860169	Edmondthorpe
Market Overton wharf	52.7350°N 0.6973°W	SK880160	
Rutland Railway Museum bridge	52.7177°N 0.6942°W	SK882141	
Ashwell Prison	52.6927°N 0.7199°W	SK866113	course in water

== See also ==
- Media related to Oakham Canal at Wikimedia Commons
- Canals of Great Britain
- History of the British canal system
- Melton and Oakham Waterways Society website

== Bibliography ==
- Hadfield, Charles (1970). The Canals of the East Midlands. David and Charles. ISBN 978-0-7153-4871-0.
- Skempton, Sir Alec; et al. (2002). A Biographical Dictionary of Civil Engineers in Great Britain and Ireland: Vol 1: 1500 to 1830. Thomas Telford. ISBN 978-0-7277-2939-2.
- Tew, David (1984). The Melton to Oakham Canal. Sycamore Press. ISBN 978-0-905837-29-1.
