= Melton Mowbray Navigation =

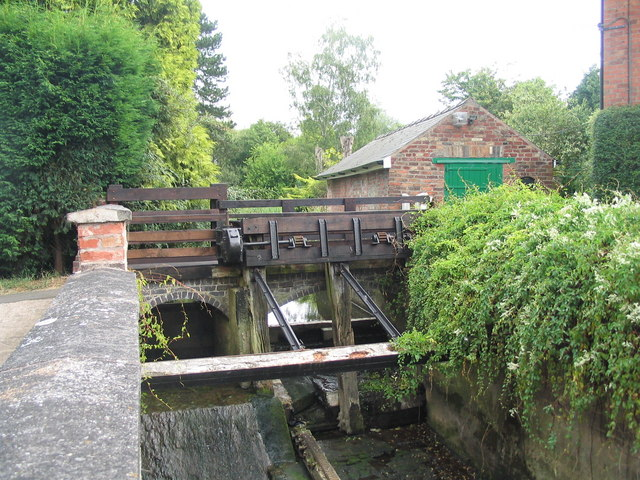
- A sluice gate at Asfordby
- Interactive map of Melton Mowbray Navigation

Specifications
- Locks: 12
- Status: Partial restoration

History
- Date of act: 1791
- Date completed: 1797
- Date closed: 1877

Geography
- Start point: Melton Mowbray
- End point: Syston
- Branch: Oakham Canal
- Connects to: Grand Union Canal

The Melton Mowbray Navigation was formed when the River Wreake in Leicestershire, England, was made navigable upstream from its junction with the River Soar and the Leicester Navigation near Syston to Melton Mowbray, opening in 1797. Largely river navigation, there were numerous lock cuts, to accommodate the 12 broad locks built along its length, many of which were built at sites where it was necessary to maintain the water levels for an adjacent mill.

With railway competition, and the closure of the Oakham Canal, to which it was connected, decline was rapid, and the canal closed in 1877. Two hundred years after it was opened, the Melton & Oakham Waterways Society was formed, with the aim of returning the navigation to a navigable waterway once more.

== History ==
Melton Mowbray Navigation Act 1791
- Act of Parliament
- Parliament of Great Britain
- Long title: An Act for making navigable the Rivers Wreak and Eye, from the Junction of the said River Wreak, with the intended Navigation from Loughborough to Leicester, at or near a certain Place called Turnwater Meadow, in the Lordship of Cossington, to Mill Close Homestead, in the Parish of Melton Mowbray, all in the County of Leicester.
- Citation: 31 Geo. 3. c. 77
- Territorial extent: Great Britain

Dates
- Royal assent: 6 June 1791
- Commencement: 10 August 1790 (Note: Start of session.)
Other legislation
Amended by	Melton Mowbray Navigation (Completion) Act 1800

Status: Amended

Text of statute as originally enacted

The first proposals to link Melton Mowbray to the canal network were made in 1780, following on from the success achieved by the Loughborough Navigation and the Erewash Canal. The intent was to make the River Soar navigable to Leicester, and the River Wreake navigable to Melton. Although nothing came of these first proposals, public meetings were held in 1785, and the civil engineer William Jessop surveyed the route in October. Around £6,000 was subscribed to fund the scheme, and thoughts of upgrading the River Eye to enable boats to reach Oakham, and of cutting a canal to Stamford were also voiced. When the opportunity came to submit the bill to Parliament in March 1786, two bills were submitted, one for the Soar from Loughborough to Leicester, and a second for the Soar from Loughborough to the mouth of the Wreake, and up the Wreake to Melton. The main Soar bill was defeated, and the Wreake bill was shelved. A single bill combining both of the previous two plans was submitted in 1789, but was again defeated, due to opposition from the Leicestershire coalfields. The proponents worked hard to win over those opposing the scheme, which was split into two again, and both bills were re-submitted in early 1791. The Leicester Navigation bill faced limited opposition, but was granted on 13 May 1791, while the Melton Mowbray Navigation faced no opposition, and was authorised by the Melton Mowbray Navigation Act 1791 (31 Geo. 3. c. 77) on 6 June 1791.

The act allowed the proprietors to raise £25,000 by issuing shares, with an additional £5,000 if required. Many of the shareholders lived locally, though there were some from further afield. William Jessop's assistant, Christopher Staveley had drawn up the detailed plans, which included details of the lock sites and cuts necessary to build them, together with sites where the river would be straightened to aid navigation. Ten mills were in operation at the time, and so that determined the location and fall of ten of the locks. Although the plans showed lock cuts with a lock at the upper end of the cut, they were moved to the lower end, as Jessop's work on the River Thames had shown that this arrangement tended to prevent the formation of a bar or shoal where the lock cut rejoined the river. Work began soon after the award of the act, with Staveley employed as engineer, although there are few details of the construction, as the company records have not survived.

Melton Mowbray Navigation (Completion) Act 1800
- Act of Parliament
- Parliament of Great Britain
- Long title: An Act for enabling the Company of Proprietors of the Navigation from the Leicester Navigation to Melton Mowbray, in the County of Leicester, to complete their Navigation, and to discharge the Debts contracted by them in the making thereof; and for amending the Act, passed in the thirty-first Year of the Reign of his present Majesty, for making and maintaining the said Navigation.
- Citation: 39 & 40 Geo. 3. c. lv
- Territorial extent: Great Britain

Dates
- Royal assent: 20 June 1800
- Commencement: 20 June 1800 (Note: The Acts of Parliament (Commencement) Act 1793.)

Status: Current legislation

Text of statute as originally enacted

The first section, from the Soar to Frisby Mill, was opened in November 1794. The canal was built during the time of the French Wars, and inflation was a problem, resulting in costs over-running. In March 1795, a special meeting was held to consider how to raise more money, while in July, Staveley was 'voted out', to be replaced by William Green, who had been involved in the construction of the Grantham Canal. Although he declared that the workmanship and the materials used were very bad, he completed the work and the navigation was open by 1797. A second act of Parliament, the Melton Mowbray Navigation (Completion) Act 1800 (39 & 40 Geo. 3. c. lv), was obtained to resolve a number of financial issues, and it seems that the total cost of the project was around £45,000. The navigation was 14.75 miles (23.74 km) long, with twelve broad locks, which raise the canal by 71 feet (22 m) between the Soar and Melton.

== Operation ==
The canal served a mainly rural area, and traffic levels reflected this. The population of Melton Mowbray was recorded as 1730 in the census of 1801. The main cargoes were coal, supplemented by barley, oats and wheat, granite, lime, wool and manure. Coal traffic amounted to 16,781 tons in 1797, although of this, 77 per cent was carried up the canal, and the rest was carried down the canal, so it appears that coal was resold to the Leicester market when prices fluctuated. The Oakham Canal, when it opened in 1802, was never a success financially, but generated extra traffic for the Melton Mowbray Navigation, with around half of the coal passing up the canal continuing on to Oakham, and agricultural produce passing down on its way to Leicester. The main wharves were at Melton Basin and Rearsby, although the figures for the period between 1839 and 1842 record nine other wharves, although the precise location of most of them is conjectural. In Melton itself, new wharves were built, which provided warehousing, a granary, a coal yard and malt offices, to the west of the main basin. Dividends on the shares gradually increased, reaching 7.5 per cent in 1809, and 10 per cent in 1821, where they remained for the next 20 years. Income from tolls exceeded £4,000 per year in the 1830s. Cargoes benefited from the connection at Syston to the very successful Leicester Navigation.

== Decline ==
The Oakham Canal had never been so profitable, paying dividends of around 3.8 per cent, and lack of water during the dry summer of 1844 resulted in it closing for five months. When the Midland Railway sought to build their Syston and Peterborough Railway, the Oakham Canal Company negotiated, and the railway bought the canal on 29 October 1847 under the Midland Railway (Oakham Canal Purchase) Act 1846 (9 & 10 Vict. c. cclv), with a view to closing it and using part of the bed for their line. The effect on the Melton Mowbray Navigation was dramatic. 1847 was its best year, for it carried 68,896 tons, of which 39,451 proceeded on to the Oakham Canal. With the Oakham closed, traffic for the following year was less than half, at 30,879 tons, and had dropped to just 13,301 tons in 1850. Income fell even faster, from £4,830 in 1847 to £415 in 1849. The canal company attempted to sell the waterway to the Loughborough Navigation in the 1860s, and then to the Midland Railway Company, but neither were interested. It struggled on until closure on 1 August 1877.

Melton Mowbray Navigation (Abandonment) Act 1877 (Note: Section 1.)
- Act of Parliament
- Parliament of the United Kingdom
- Long title: An Act to provide for the closing of the undertaking of the Company of Proprietors of the Navigation from the Leicester Navigation to Melton Mowbray, in the county of Leicester, and for the dissolution of the said Company, and the winding up of the affairs thereof; and for other purposes.
- Citation: 40 & 41 Vict. c. lxxviii

Dates
- Royal assent: 12 July 1877
- Commencement: 12 July 1877

Status: Current legislation

Text of statute as originally enacted

The Melton Mowbray Navigation (Abandonment) Act 1877 (40 & 41 Vict. c. lxxviii) required the structures of the canal to be put into good order before they were abandoned, and this process was overseen by the engineer A. W. Dalton. Crescent shaped weirs were built in place of the upper lock gates, and some of the bridges were lowered while others were rebuilt. The towpaths, which were rented from the owners of the banks, reverted to their owners.

== Restoration ==
Restoration of the navigation and the Oakham Canal was first proposed by the Leicester Branch of the Inland Waterways Association in 1997, and this led to the formation of the Melton & Oakham Waterways Society. Very few bridges have been lowered (the principal one being Lewin Bridge, which carries the Fosse Way at Syston), and most lock chambers are still extant though in need of repair. A slipway has been built in Melton Mowbray by Waterway Recovery Group volunteers, some dredging and towpath repairs undertaken, and the society has worked with the Sustrans Connect2 project to replace the entrance footbridge at Syston with one offering navigable headroom. Sustrans were awarded £50 million by the People's Lottery Fund in 2008, to fund 79 projects, of which the bridge replacement was one. Work began on the new bridge, which provides 8 feet (2.4 m) of headroom, in late 2012, following lengthy discussions between the society, Sustrans, Leicestershire County Council and British Waterways, and it was completed in 2013. The demolished Syston Lock needs to be rebuilt to open up the first 1 mile (1.6 km) of the waterway to Lewin Bridge and the Gate Hangs Well public house.

== Points of interest ==
Point	Coordinates (Links to map resources)	OS Grid Ref	Notes
Melton Mowbray basin	52.7619°N 0.8844°W	SK753188	
Eye Kettleby Lock	52.7576°N 0.9086°W	SK737183	
Kirby Bellars Lock	52.7553°N 0.9359°W	SK719180	
Asfordby Lock	52.7603°N 0.9558°W	SK705185	
Frisby Mill Lock	52.7558°N 0.9679°W	SK697180	
Washstones Lock	52.7542°N 0.9839°W	SK686178	
Hoby Lock	52.7500°N 1.0036°W	SK673173	
Brooksby Lock	52.7409°N 1.0099°W	SK669163	
Thrussington Mill Lock	52.7350°N 1.0290°W	SK656157	
Rearsby Mill Lock	52.7288°N 1.0509°W	SK641149	
Ratcliffe Mill Lock	52.7216°N 1.0671°W	SK631141	
Ratcliffe Meadow Lock	52.7130°N 1.0734°W	SK626132	
Syston Mill Lock	52.7064°N 1.0914°W	SK614124	
Jn with Grand Union Canal	52.7009°N 1.0966°W	SK611118	

== See also ==
- Canals of Great Britain
- History of the British canal system

== Bibliography ==
- Cumberlidge, Jane (2009). Inland Waterways of Great Britain (8th Ed.). Imray Laurie Norie and Wilson. ISBN 978-1-84623-010-3.
- Denny, Andrew (April 2015). "Wreake Dreams". Waterways World. ISSN 0309-1422.
- Hadfield, Charles (1970). The Canals of the East Midlands. David and Charles. ISBN 978-0-7153-4871-0.
- Miller, M. G.; Fletcher, S. (1984). The Melton Mowbray Navigation. Railway and Canal Historical Society. ISBN 978-0-901461-37-7.
- Nicholson (2003). Nicholson Guides Vol 3: Birmingham and the Heart of England. Harper Collins Publishers. ISBN 978-0-00-713666-7.
- Squires, Roger (2008). Britain's restored canals. Landmark Publishing. ISBN 978-1-84306-331-5.
- Ware, Michael E (1989). Britain's Lost Waterways. Moorland Publishing Co. ISBN 978-0-86190-327-6.
