= Ratcliffe on the Wreake =

Village in Leicestershire, England

Coordinates: 52°43′30.50″N 1°4′5.00″W

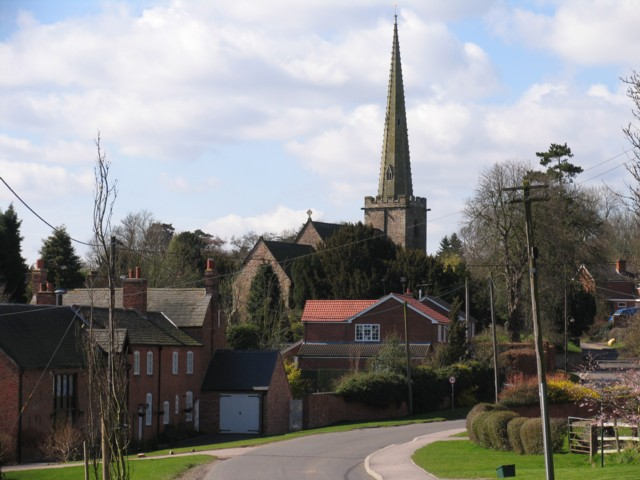

- Location within Leicestershire
- Population: 179
- District: Charnwood
- Shire county: Leicestershire
- Region: East Midlands
- Country: England
- Sovereign state: United Kingdom
- Post town: LEICESTER
- Postcode district: LE7
- Dialling code: 01664
- Police: Leicestershire
- Fire: Leicestershire
- Ambulance: East Midlands
- UK Parliament: Melton and Syston

Ratcliffe on the Wreake is a village and civil parish in the Charnwood district of Leicestershire, England. The population of the civil parish at the 2011 census was 179. It is just to the north of the River Wreake, opposite East Goscote.

The village is small enough not to have a parish council; instead it has a parish meeting consisting of all the electorate. The 14th-century St Botolph parish church is a Grade II* listed building.

Ratcliffe Hall is a Grade II listed country house built c. 1812 by Robert Shirley, 7th Earl Ferrers and was inherited by his granddaughter, Caroline Shirley, Duchess Sforza Cesarini, who had married into the Italian aristocracy. It subsequently descended to the pioneer aviator, Sir William Lindsay Everard, who set up Ratcliffe Aerodrome, which opened with a 'Grand Air Pageant' on 6 September 1930. Famed aviator Amy Johnson made an unexpected trip from London to participate with Sir Sefton Brancker, Director of Civil Aviation. Some 5,000 spectators were treated to a show with 100 planes and staged bombings of Chinese pirates. There was one crash, but no one was killed. Ratcliffe Aerodrome was one of the finest in civil aviation with a comfortable clubhouse and an outdoor pool. The hangars were first class and the many air shows and displays had the atmosphere of a garden party.

Ratcliffe is known for its abundance in wildlife especially crayfish which inhabit the River Wreake right through the village.

The village is also home to Ratcliffe College, a private, co-educational day and boarding school founded in 1845. It is situated on approximately 200 acres of land along the Fosse Way. It operates with a strong Roman Catholic ethos and operates under the trusteeship of the Rosminian order.

== RAF Ratcliffe ==
As RAF Ratcliffe, it was an important Air Transport Auxiliary ferry pool in World War II.

Apart from East Goscote, nearby places are Thrussington, further up the Wreake, Syston, further down, and Sileby, to the north-west.
