= Thrussington =

Village in Leicestershire, England

Coordinates: 52.736944°N 1.041111°W

- Location within Leicestershire
- Population: 581 (2011)
- District: Charnwood
- Shire county: Leicestershire
- Region: East Midlands
- Country: England
- Sovereign state: United Kingdom
- Post town: Leicester
- Postcode district: LE7
- Dialling code: 01664
- Police: Leicestershire
- Fire: Leicestershire
- Ambulance: East Midlands
- UK Parliament: Melton and Syston

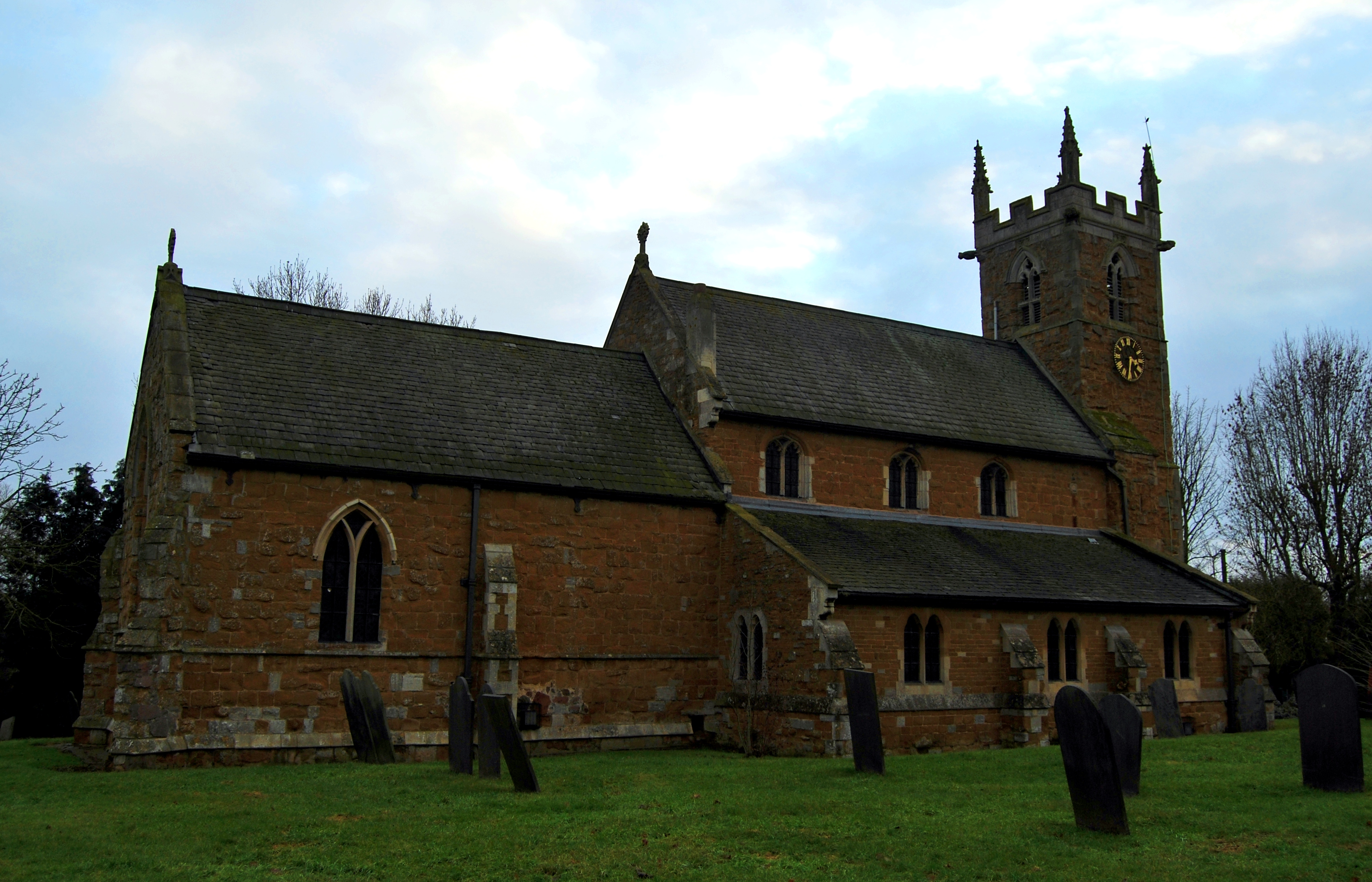
Thrussington Holy Trinity north aspect

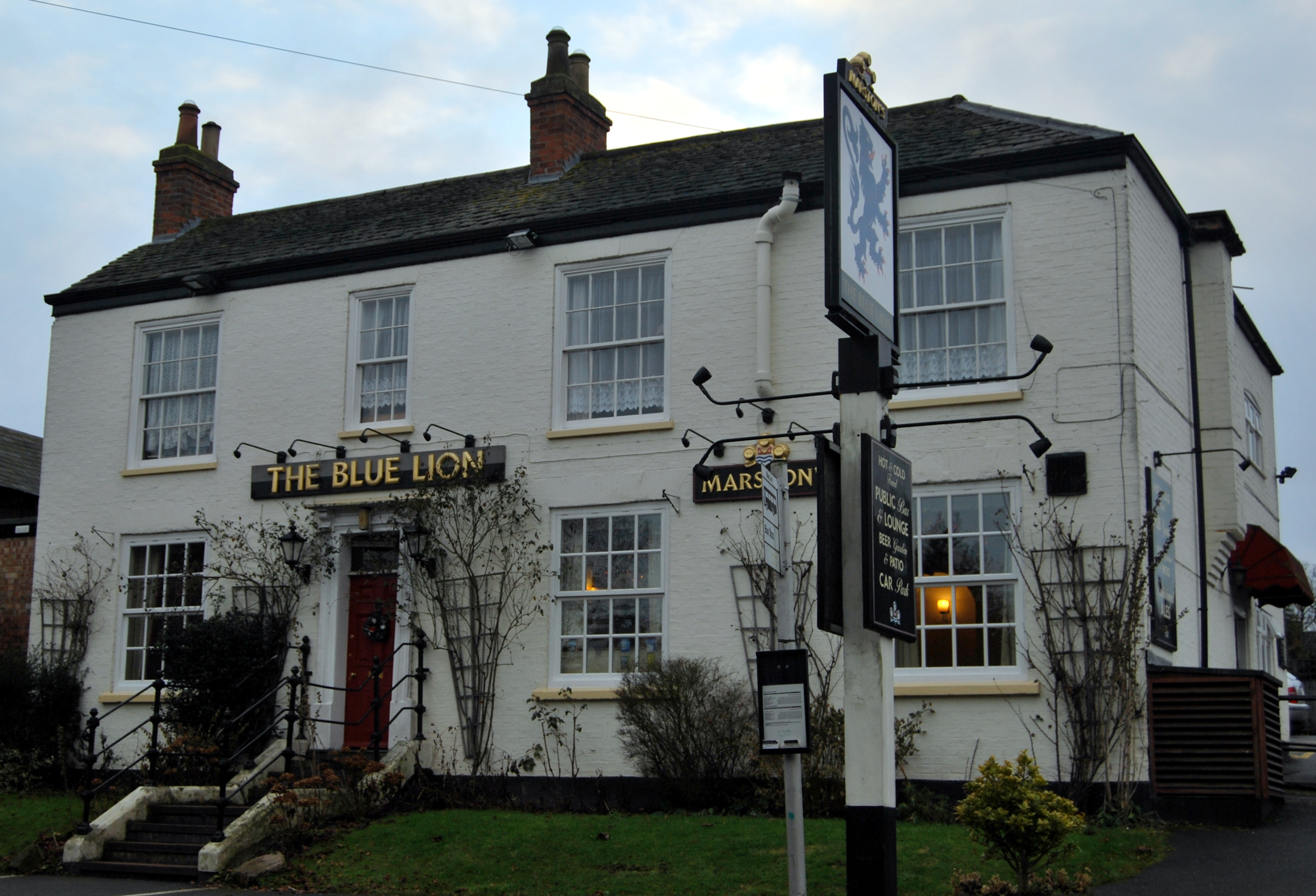
The Blue Lion

Thrussington is a village and civil parish in the Charnwood district of Leicestershire, England. The population of the civil parish at the 2011 census was 587. It is on the River Wreake, near to Rearsby, Ratcliffe on the Wreake, Hoby and Brooksby, and not far from the path of the Fosse Way.

== Toponymy ==
The place-name 'Thrussington' is first attested in the Domesday Book of 1086, where it appears as Turstanetone. It appears as Tursteineston in the Pipe Rolls of 1175. The name means 'Thursten's town or settlement'.

== History ==
On Friday 19 April 1963 a BAC Jet Provost from RAF Syerston narrowly missed the Drome Filling Station on the A46, being only feet from the roof of the cafe. 18 year old Pilot Officer Nicholas Tillotson was from 28 Belvedere Gardens in Tettenhall, of No. 2 Flying Training School RAF. He ejected at 5,000 ft, after he had put the plane in a spin at 18,000 ft.

== Events ==
The village boasts several annual events, including the Thrussington Fun Run, Skittles on The Green, and various social and fund–raising events (most of which raise money for the local school, church, or village hall). According to the Thrussington Parish council web site Thrussington is a small village which originated as a Danish settlement on the western side of the River Wreake. The village is a thriving community of approximately 550 residents, and has a school, hairdresser and two public houses. The village church is Holy Trinity and is of Norman origin. The village seems to have been shared, in political and historical terms, between the Lords of Loughborough and Melton, as there is no record of a "Lord of the Manor". In the 19th century, Sir Harry Goodrick, Bart., was a patron of the sports of cockfighting, boxing, and hunting with hounds.

John Marius Wilson's Imperial Gazetteer of England and Wales described Thrussington: "THRUSSINGTON, a parish, with a village, in Barrow-upon-Soar district, Leicester; on the river Wreak, ½ a mile N of Rearsby r. station, and 7½ WSW of Melton-Mowbray. It has a post-office under Leicester. Acres, 2,200. Real property, £4,113. Pop., 574. Houses, 136. The manor is divided among four. The living is a vicarage in the diocese of Peterborough. Value, £240. Patron, Mrs. Bishop. The church was repaired in 1836. There are three dissenting chapels, a slightly endowed school, and charities £11." The Anglican church is dedicated to The Holy Trinity and seats 250. It was built in the 14th century, substantially repaired in 1836, and further restored in 1877, including the tower.

The village has had some success in promoting its "in bloom" image.

== Population ==
The Parish of Thrussington has a population of around 500 people.

== Transport ==
Thrussington is situated one mile east of the A46 giving easy access by car to both Leicester and Nottingham.

A Ross Motorgrill was built around 1968, which was a licensed restaurant, by the same owners of Leicester Forest East services. There was another at Hinckley on the A5, at the A47 junction. Both Thrussington and Hinckley became Little Chefs.

By 1970 it was called the Green Acres Restaurant, owned by Ernest Edwards. It was taken over by RoadChef in July 1974. It became Little Chef around November 1979 at the Green Acres Filling Station, and during the 1980s the site was frequently burgled. The 20-room lodge opened in 1987. In November 1998 a cashier was threatened with an axe. These robbers raided a gun shop, four days later, in Lincolnshire and staged an armed robbery on a building society. It closed in September 2012.

Six Hills services was built on the northbound in 1990, as Elf. It became Shell in November 2012.

== World Wars ==
A cenotaph on Thrussington's Village Green honours the citizens of the village who served their country in military service during the twentieth century's wars.
