= Frisby, Leicestershire =

Hamlet in Leicestershire, England

Coordinates: 52.607499°N 0.962351°W

Frisby
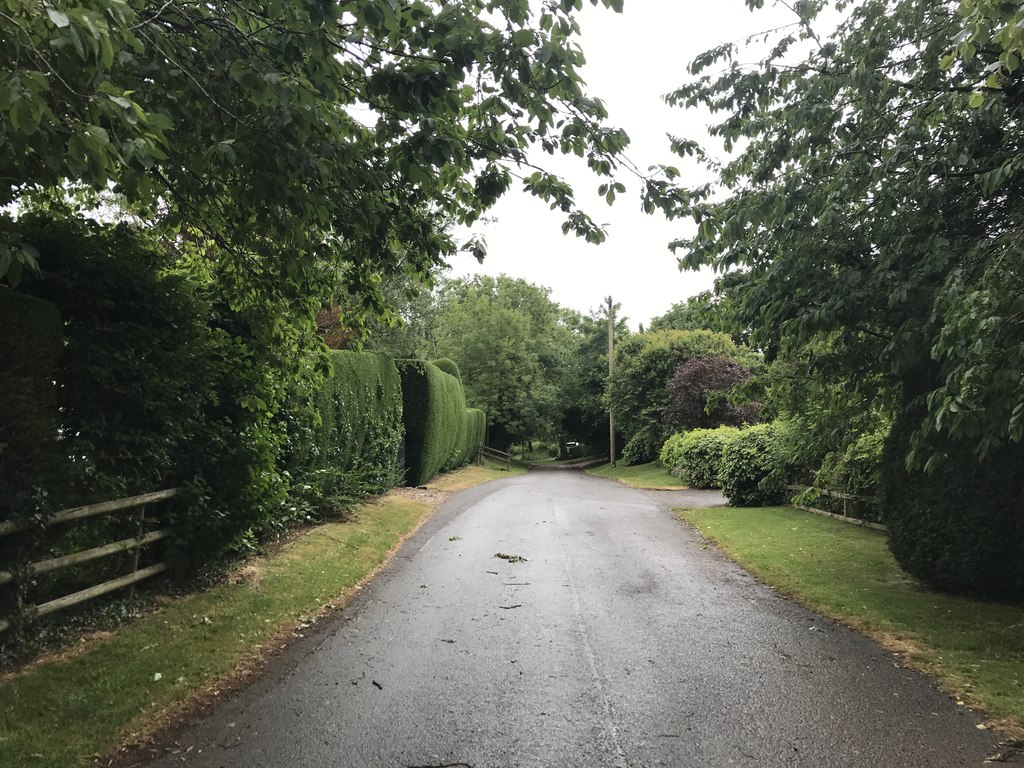
- Frisby (2020)

- Location within Leicestershire
- Area: 1.50460 sq mi (3.8969 km^{2})
- Population: 16 (2011)
  - Density: 11/sq mi (4.2/km^{2})
- OS grid reference: SK703015
  - London: 84.38 mi (135.80 km)
- Civil parish: Frisby
- District: Harborough
- Shire county: Leicestershire
- Region: East Midlands
- Country: England
- Sovereign state: United Kingdom
- Post town: LEICESTER
- Postcode district: LE7
- Dialling code: 0116
- Police: Leicestershire
- Fire: Leicestershire
- Ambulance: East Midlands
- UK Parliament: Rutland and Stamford

Frisby is a hamlet and civil parish in the Harborough district of Leicestershire that lies approximately 7.3 miles (11.7 km) southeast of the city of Leicester, that is now largely a deserted medieval village. The 2011 census for Frisby returned 5 houses and 16 residents. Often termed as Frisby by Gaulby (so as not to be confused with the nearby village of Frisby on the Wreake), the modern hamlet is situated between the village of Gaulby 1 mile (1.6 km) to the southwest and Billesdon 1.94 miles (3.12 km) to the northeast.

== Toponymy ==
According to the University of Nottingham English Place-names project, the settlement name Frisby could mean 'farm/settlement of the Frisians'.

== Archaeology ==
The deserted part of the ancient hamlet is a Scheduled Ancient Monument and can be located on the eastern side of the lane that leads down the hill from Gaulby Road, via Frisby House on a south-eastwards direction. The earthwork "tofts & crofts" are still visible today, with foundations for two stone built buildings noted towards the center of the site (grid reference SK 70547 01602).

== History ==
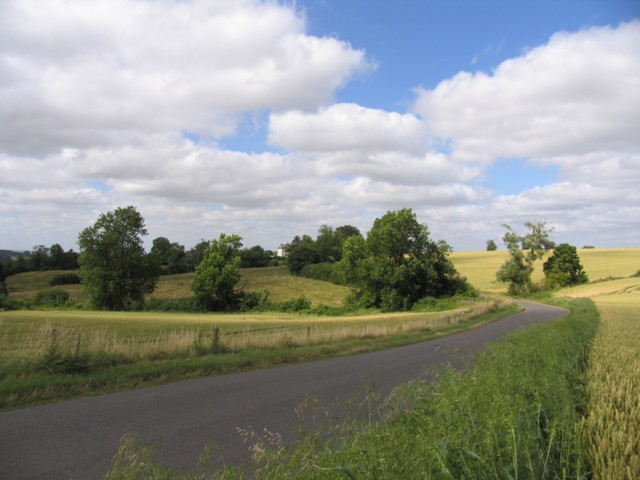
Gaulby Road: looking towards Frisby (2006)

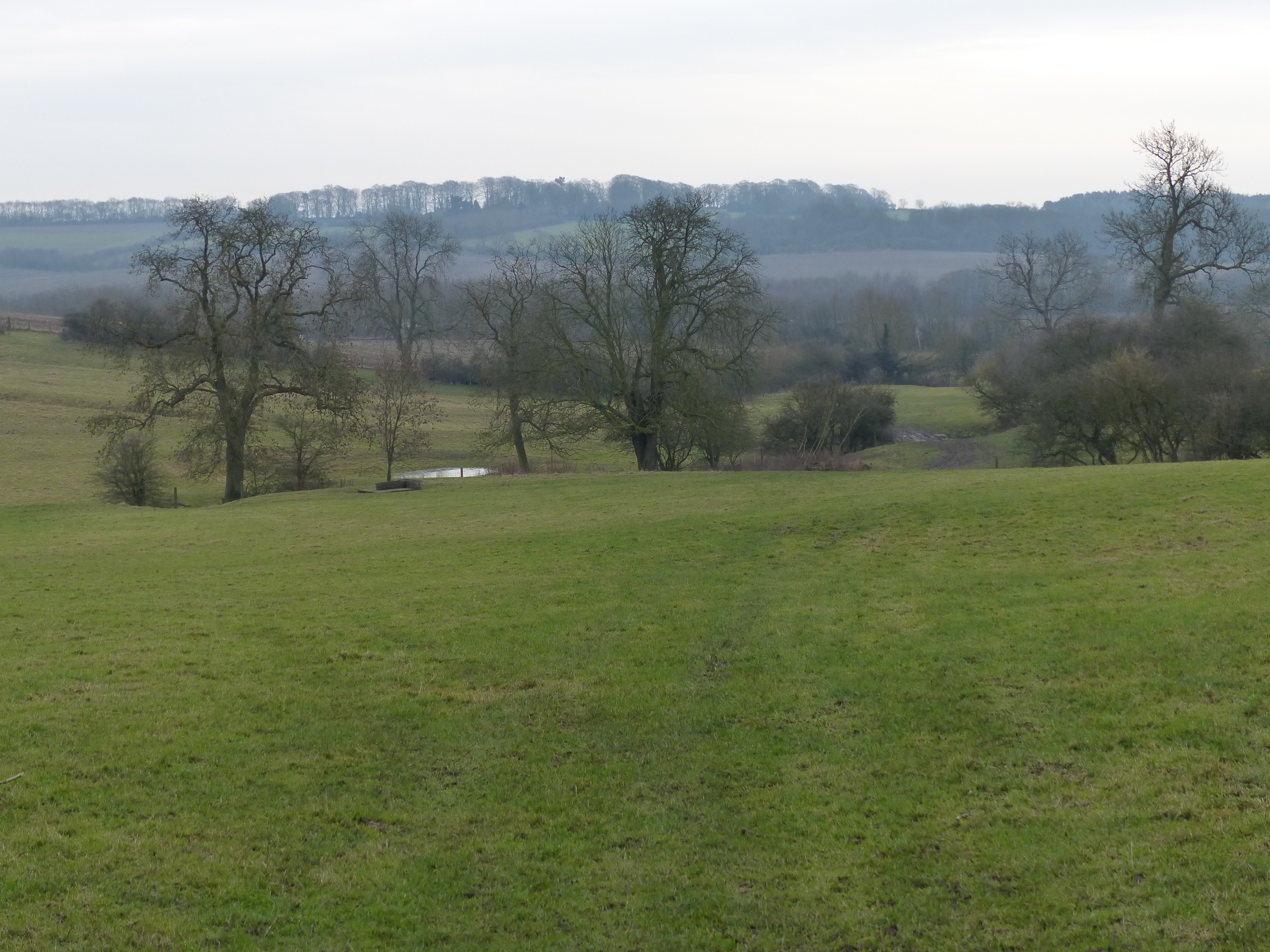
Site of deserted medieval village (2013)

Mentioned in the Domesday Book survey of 1086, Frisby was a settlement that was part of the manor of Gaulby in the Hundred of Gartree, Leicestershire. It had an estimate of 29.9 households (representing the heads of families, with an average 5 persons per household) and was considered to be a large settlement in 1086. The Lordship of Frisby (juxta Gaulby) by 1086 was held by Fulco, under Hugh de Grandmesnil. Archaeological evidence of activity prior to this is very slim, but the name of the settlement does imply an Anglo-Saxon origin, possibly founded sometime between the 7th and 8th century. At around 1220, the Rolls of Hugh de Welles reveal that there was a chapel in Frisby. The Poll Tax returns of 1381 listed 16 houses in Frisby with 39 people deemed eligible to pay. A subsidy taken in 1524 listed 10 households, implying a significant drop in population during the 1400s. 40 years later, the Bishop of Lincoln returns (1562-1564) show a further reduction, listing only 8 houses. Inclosure of the land began to take place at this stage, and it is believed that by 1655 a significant amount of land around Frisby was inclosed; with much of the land utilised for the breeding and raising of livestock. By 1679, inclosure activity in the parish was complete. A Hearth Tax return reflected a small growth in size by 1666, listing 10 houses. However, a century later, the printer and author John Nichols noted that Frisby remained a small hamlet within the parish of Gaulby and that the chapel was reduced to nothing more than a grassy mound where it once stood, locally identified as "Chapel Mount". By 1801, the new national census listed a population of 23 in Frisby, and only 5 houses remained standing by 1831. By the 1870s, the hamlet listed 4 houses, along with 19 residents which reduced even further by 1931 with a population of only 12 residents.

== The Chapel ==
It is not known when the chapel was founded, but the earliest record of a chapel in Frisby is mentioned in the Matriculus of Hugh de Welles (c.1220) stating that the mother church of Gaulby serves the Frisby community 3 days a week from a chapel in the hamlet. The chapel was dedicated to St James, which was forgotten until bequests to the chapel of St James were discovered listed in wills dating from the early 1530s. However, there is no mention of St James after 1533, supporting the notion that the Reformation may have contributed towards the chapel's demise. By the late 18th century, the author John Nichols declared that nothing remained of the chapel.

Nichols noted in "The history and antiquities of the county of Leicester" Vol. 2, Part 2:

"Frisby is noticed in the "Liber Regis" as a chaplry in the parish of Gaulby; but the chapel is there said to be desecrated. Mr. Wyrley, who visited this chapel in 1591, found "nothing of any note there." No remains are now to be seen, except a bank in the town-street, which is called Chapel Mount."

The site of the chapel of St James is believed to be situated behind the Frisby House Farmhouse which is a Grade II listed building on the left side of the lane as you enter the village from Gaulby Road. It is said that a timber roof beam was salvaged from the site by a farmer and used in the roof of a farm building on the opposite side of the lane.

== Buildings ==
A 16th century outbuilding, now incorporated as part of the house opposite Frisby House Farmhouse is a Grade II listed building. The outbuilding is about 30 metres southwest of Frisby House Farmhouse and displays what is believed to be the lower story of a house built of quarried ironstone and stone mullioned windows. These features are consistent with construction styles of the period.
