= Syston and Peterborough Railway =

Railway in England

The Syston and Peterborough Railway was an early railway in England opened between 1846 and 1848 to form a connection from the Midland Counties Railway near Leicester to Peterborough, giving access to East Anglia over the Eastern Counties Railway. The project was part of the ambition of George Hudson to establish and maintain a monopoly of railway service over a large area of England. The surveying of the line achieved notoriety when Robert Sherard, 6th Earl of Harborough, who was hostile to railways, arranged a battle to obstruct surveys of the proposed line, and later of its construction.

The line later formed part of a new direct route from Nottingham to Kettering and London, and later still was the base of the Midland and Great Northern Joint Railway, giving access to Norfolk and parts of Suffolk.

The core of the line between Syston and Peterborough remains in use today, carrying a useful service for cross-country traffic.

== Origins ==
=== First railways; and the rise of George Hudson ===
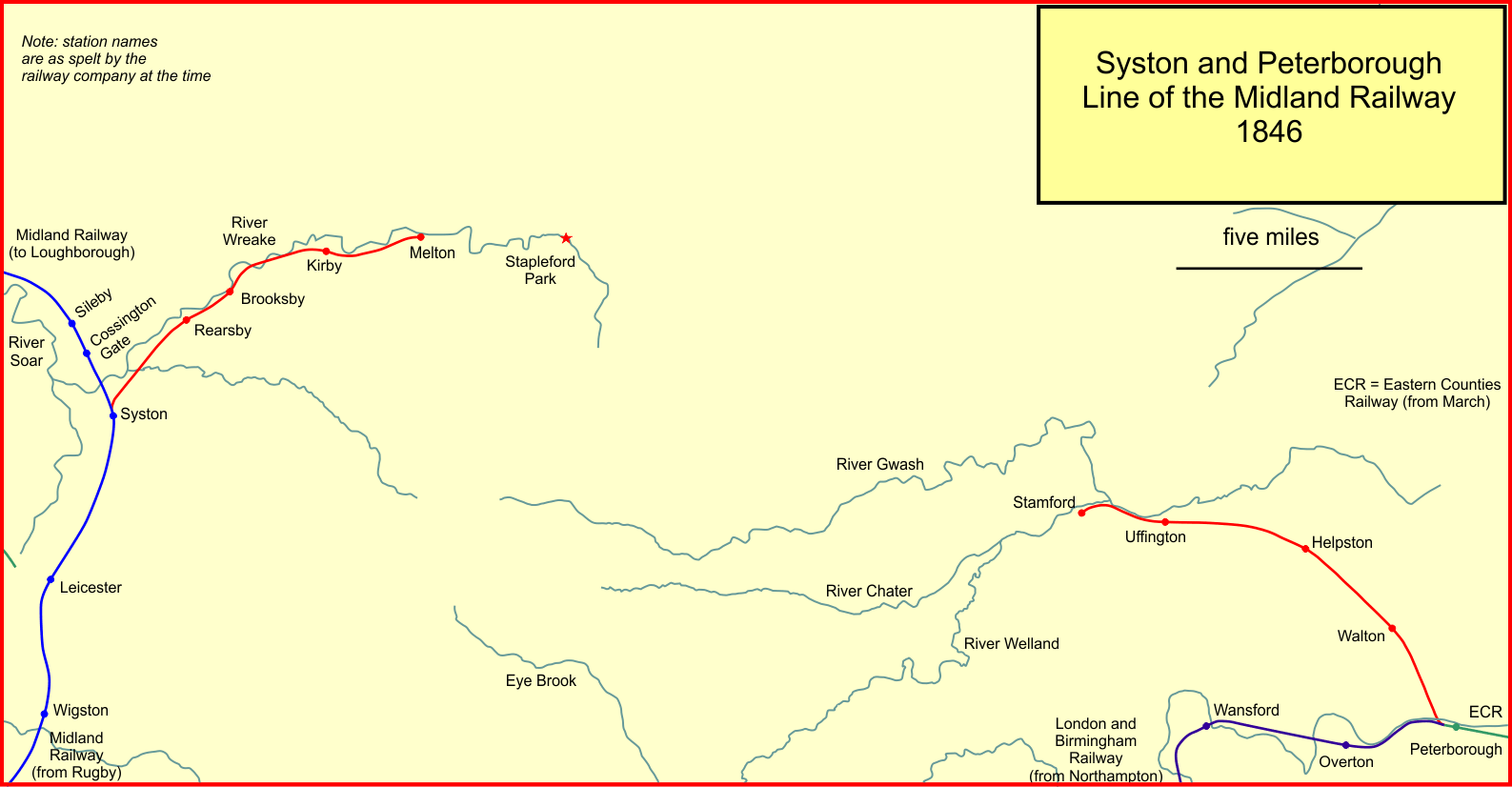
The beginnings of the Syston to Peterborough line in 1846

On 10 May 1844, the Midland Railway Consolidation Act 1844 (7 & 8 Vict. c. xviii) was passed, creating the Midland Railway, a new company, by the amalgamation of three smaller concerns. From the outset, its chairman was George Hudson, the so-called 'Railway King'. Hudson was a skilful manipulator, and his methods were often dubious. He dominated several railway companies, and his ambition was to get them working together to form a near-monopoly, at a time when control of a large district of the country by a railway concern was feasible. His lines formed a through route from York to Rugby, where it joined the London and Birmingham Railway (later the London and North Western Railway—LNWR), giving access to London. Although long-distance passenger business was important, the transport of coal from colliery districts to industrial areas was dominant; and transport of manufactured goods to areas of consumption was also key.

=== Great Northern Railway proposed, and opposed by Hudson ===
In 1844 promoters put together a scheme to link London and York; it became considerably modified and was later called the Great Northern Railway (GNR), to connect London and Doncaster. Hudson saw this as a competitive threat to his lines: as well as providing a more direct route between London and York than his own affiliated companies, the GNR would block the route by which Hudson's lines might connect to East Anglia. Hudson also controlled the Eastern Counties Railway, and the area it served was a large consumer of coal and agricultural supplies, hitherto not well connected to the railway network north of London. Hudson’s plan was that his Midland Railway and his Eastern Counties Railway would link and monopolise that traffic.

Accordingly Hudson went to great lengths in an attempt to frustrate the Great Northern Railway's authorisation in Parliament, but ultimately he failed and the Great Northern Railway Act 1846 (9 & 10 Vict. c. lxxi) was passed, on 26 June 1846. The GNR promoters had spent £590,355 on parliamentary expenses. (Note: Something over £73 million in 2022.)

== Planning and construction ==
=== Authorisation ===
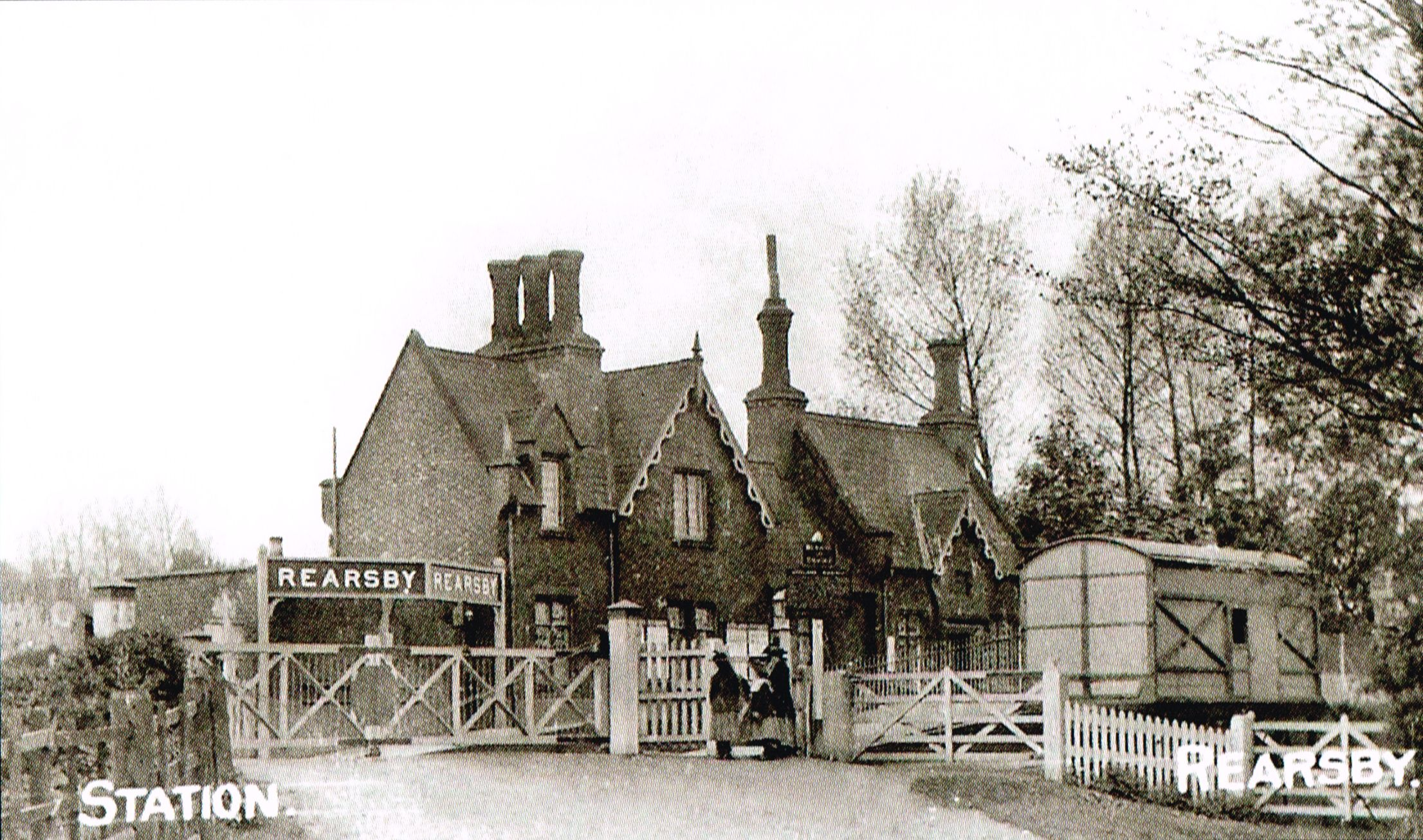
Rearsby station

Having failed to kill off the Great Northern Railway promoters' scheme, Hudson now took steps to enhance his access to East Anglia. The Eastern Counties Railway was established there and was planned to reach Peterborough. Hudson now proposed a new railway from the Midland Railway main line at Syston, north of Leicester, to Peterborough, where it could link with the Eastern Counties Railway. The new line was expected to cost £700,000.

The Syston and Peterborough line was authorised by an act of Parliament, the Midland Railway Act 1845 (8 & 9 Vict. c. lvi), on 30 June 1845.

The act authorised construction of a branch line to Peterborough from a triangular junction at Syston; the line would run through Melton Mowbray, Oakham, Luffenham and Stamford, forming a junction at Peterborough, not with the north-south Great Northern Railway, but the intended west to east Eastern Counties Railway. The Midland trains were to have running powers into the ECR's passenger station and goods yard there.

=== The Battle of Saxby ===
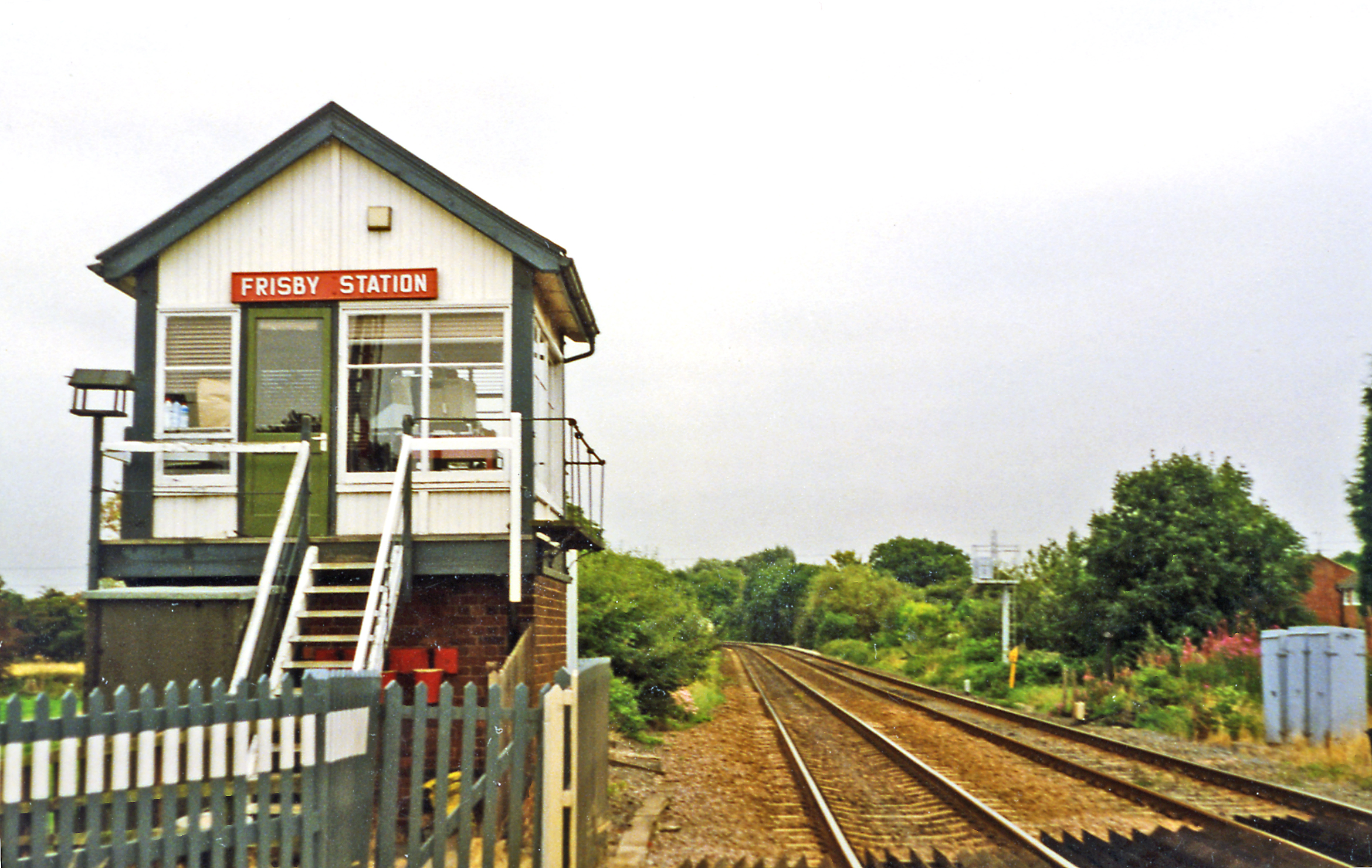
Frisby signal box and station site

Lord Harborough had his estate at Stapleford Park, near Saxby. The Midland Railway’s intention was to make the line of railway pass the margin of his estate, but Lord Harborough was exceptionally hostile to the railway’s incursion. As well as his personal aversion to it, he was a major shareholder in the Oakham Canal; this had opened in 1802, bringing coal to Oakham and taking agricultural produce away; the canal was threatened commercially by the railway.

In an encounter that marked the first phase of what came to be called the Battle of Saxby, seven of Hudson's surveyors arrived in the Stapleford area in November 1844 to survey the route of the line. Lord Harborough had fixed notices at the boundaries of his lands, notices prohibiting entry to his park for surveying purposes, and he had stationed estate workers at strategic points along his boundaries. As they approached the Park, the Midland surveyors were confronted by several of Lord Harborough's men, armed with pitchforks and sticks, and ordered away, even though they were still on public land. When they refused to turn back, they were "arrested", and taken by cart to the local magistrate. Since the Midland men had committed no crime, there was no legal action that could be taken against them; a policeman pointed this out to Harborough's man, and he had to be content with tipping them out of the cart into the road.

The following day the surveyors returned, supported by a large group of navvies, as well as some prize-fighters from Nottingham. Lord Harborough's men had also reinforced their numbers, and a general fight followed. The Midland surveyors were eventually put to flight. Violence escalated again a couple of days later in another battle, during which surveying equipment was badly damaged. Several prison sentences and fines were awarded to the fighting men on both sides, and surveying activities were suspended for the time being.

=== Further obstruction from Lord Harborough ===
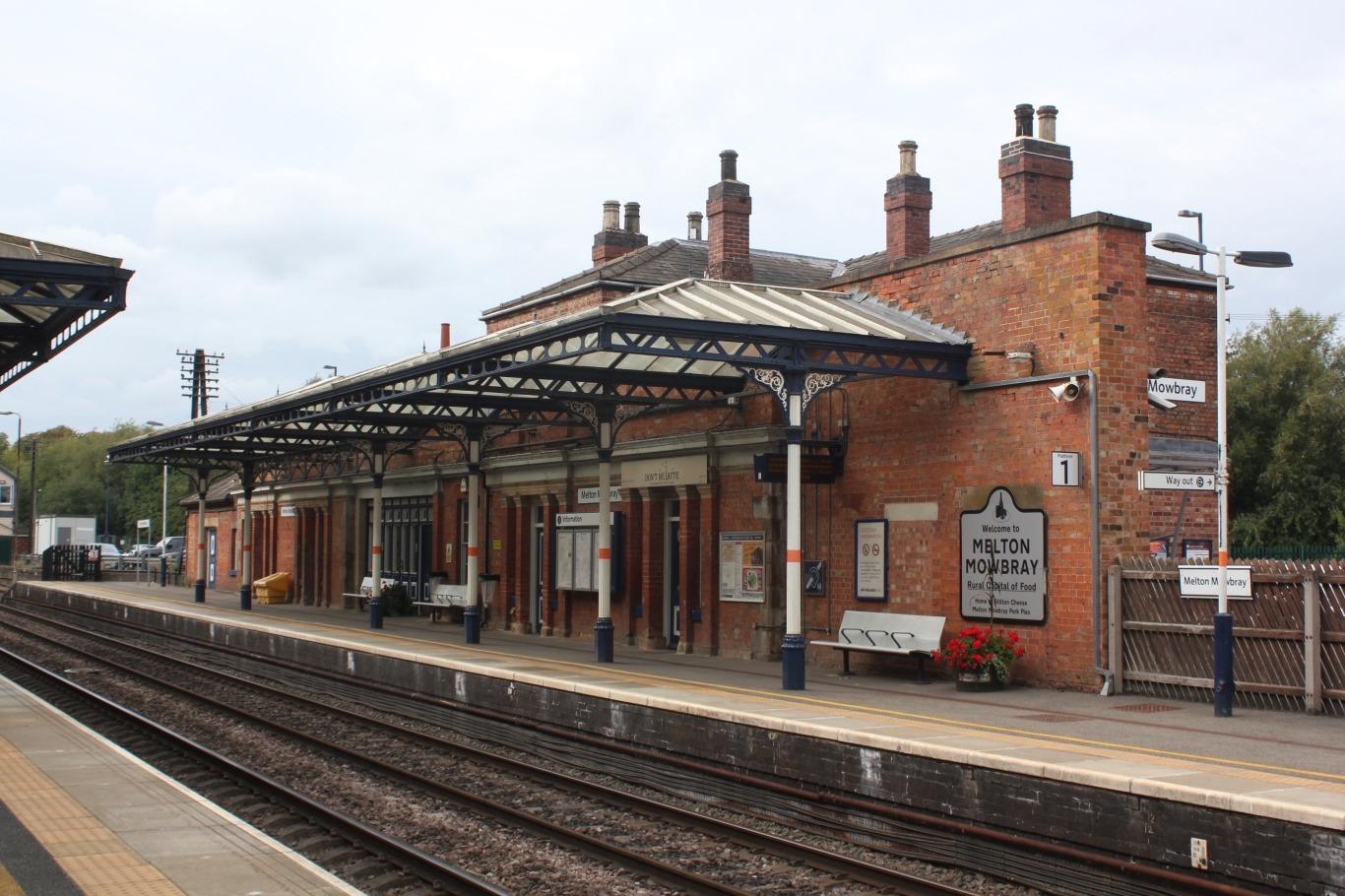
Melton Mowbray station up platform

Even after the MR had gained parliamentary approval for its route in June 1845, Lord Harborough stubbornly refused to allow any construction work to be started anywhere near his estate. Faced with this unreasonable opposition, the Midland Railway decided to re-route the line a little further away from Stapleford Park, but when the surveyors arrived, with a bodyguard, to take new measurements and levels they were once again confronted by a group of Lord Harborough's men, and the second Battle of Saxby was soon in full swing. (Note: Clark refers to this as the Battle of Saxby Bridge (over the Oakham Canal). He says that fifty surveyors were involved in this encounter.) This time Lord Harborough himself participated by driving his carriage into the ranks of the surveyors. The surveying did eventually get done, and the deviation was authorised by the Midland Railway Act 1846 (9 & 10 Vict. c. li) of 16 June 1846, with the provision for a tunnel to be driven underneath a spinney of fine trees known as Cuckoo Plantation, on Lord Harborough's estate so that the offending trains would be hidden from his Lordship’s view. Unfortunately during construction the tunnel collapsed, causing subsidence to the trees and increased hostility from Harborough.

Midland Railway (Syston and Peterborough Deviations and Manton Approach) Act 1847
- Act of Parliament
- Parliament of the United Kingdom
- Long title: An Act to authorize certain Deviations in the Line of the Syston and Peterborough Branch of the Midland Railway, and the Formation of a Road or Approach to the intended Manton Station thereof.
- Citation: 10 & 11 Vict. c. ccxv

Dates
- Royal assent: 22 July 1847

Text of statute as originally enacted

A legal battle followed, and yet another deviation was authorised by the Midland Railway (Syston and Peterborough Deviations and Manton Approach) Act 1847 (10 & 11 Vict. c. ccxv) on 22 July 1847. By this time, the two sections of line on either side of the Saxby area had already been built and were in operation, that from Syston to Melton from 1 September 1846, and from Peterborough to Stamford from 2 October 1846. Because of Lord Harborough's intransigence, it was not until 1 May 1848 that these two sections were linked, and the whole through route in operation.

The Midland Railway had agreed to purchase the Oakham Canal in April 1845, for the sum of £26,000 and 200 new Midland £40 shares. Traffic on the canal was clearly declining, and in the very dry summer of 1844 the waterway had been unnavigable for five months and goods had to be transported by road.

=== Opening ===
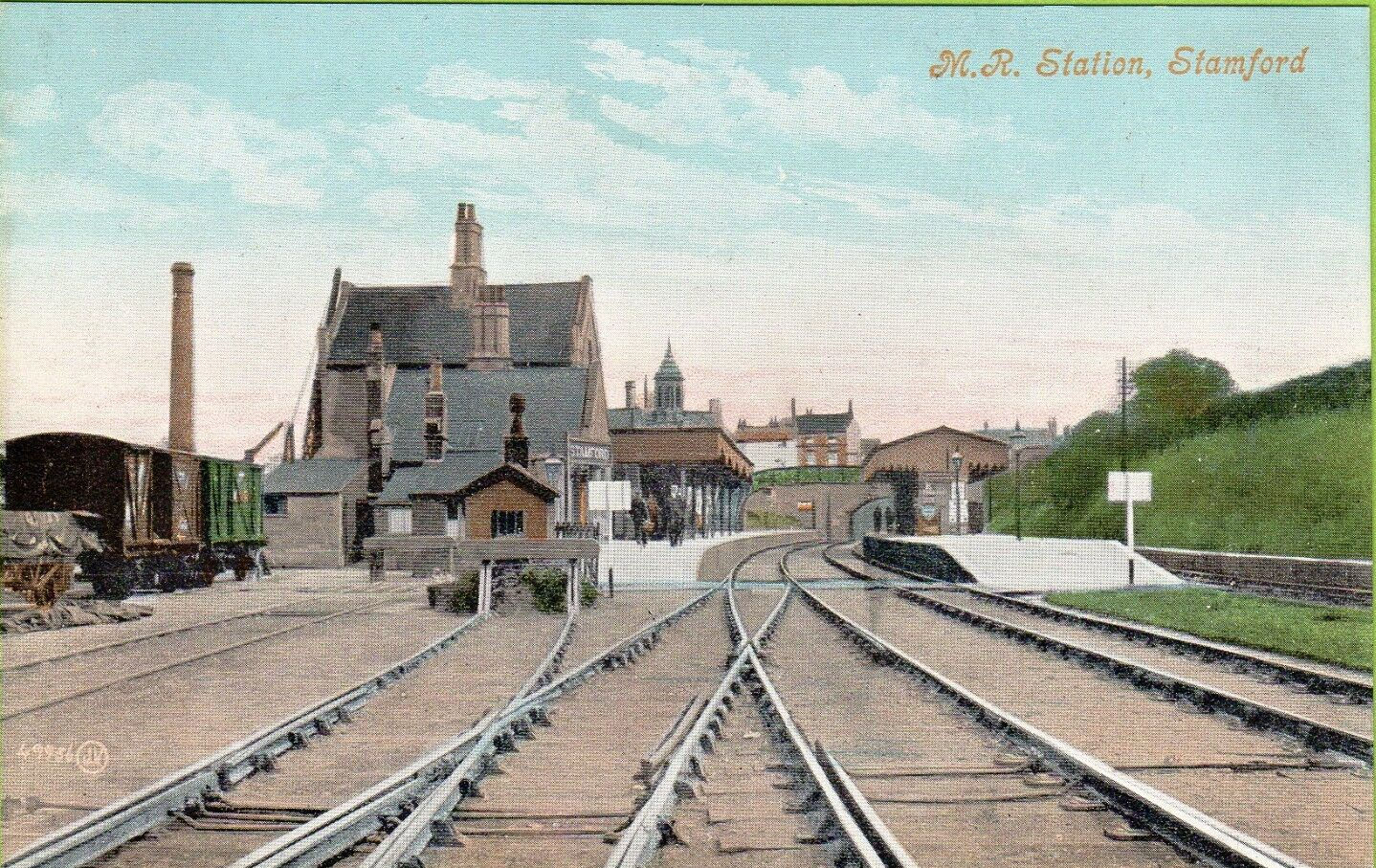
Stamford railway station

Notwithstanding Lord Harborough's obstructive tactics, the Midland Railway had got the authorising act for its line, and at length was able to construct the line, if not to its preferred alignment near Saxby.

The line opened in stages: from Syston South Junction (as it became) to Melton Mowbray on 1 September 1846; and from a temporary station at Stamford to the ECR station at Peterborough on 2 October 1846. There was to be a tunnel at Stamford, its construction accounting for the delay.

At first the only station at Peterborough was the Eastern Counties Railway station, on a west to east alignment (much later known as Peterborough East). In fact the ECR itself did not reach there (from Ely and March) until 1847, so that for a time from 2 June 1845, it was only served by London and Birmingham Railway trains from Northampton.

The London and Birmingham Railway had suggested to the Eastern Counties Railway that a joint station would be mutually beneficial, but this was opposed by the ECR. The ECR's Ely line was not opened for goods traffic until 10 December 1846 and for passengers until 14 January 1847.

Meanwhile, traffic on the L&BR branch had so expanded that the track into Peterborough was doubled in September 1846. On 2 October 1846 of that year, still in advance of the ECR, the Midland Railway line from Stamford was opened, crossing the River Nene by a timber bridge, and using the ECR station and goods facilities. In 1923 this station was renamed Peterborough East, but for the time being it was the only Peterborough station, owned by the ECR and only used by two guest railways, the L&BR and the Midland Railway.

The Stamford to Peterborough line of the Midland Railway was of course cut off from the rest of the company’s network, and the MR arranged for it to be worked at first by the London and North Western Railway, of which the London and Birmingham Railway had become a part, and then, with a Stamford-Ely service, by the Eastern Counties Railway. The Midland line was single track at first but soon converted to double track.

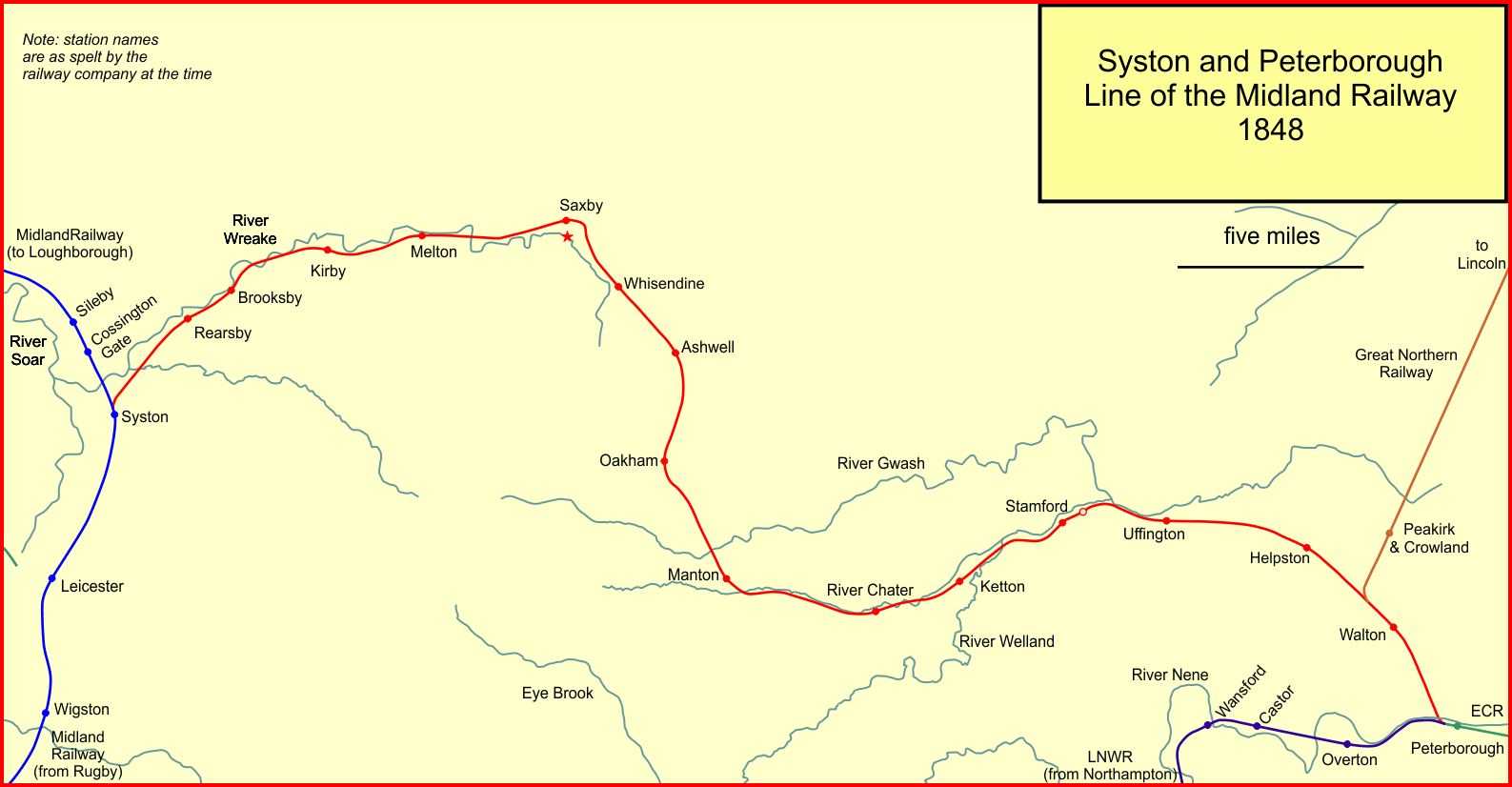
The Syston to Peterborough line in 1848

The central section of the line opened on 20 March 1848 to goods trains, and fully on 1 May 1848.

The authorisation for the line had included an east-to-north curve at Syston. This was opened in early 1854.

== Great Northern Railway at Peterborough ==
The Great Northern Railway was building its line from Lincoln to Peterborough, but it was temporarily unable to complete its line at the Peterborough end, requiring additional powers for some shared bridge structures. Accordingly on 17 October 1848 it opened from Lincoln to Peterborough, but at Werrington Junction a temporary connection was made to the Midland Railway line, and for a time GNR trains ran over the Midland line, and used the Eastern Counties Railway station as a temporary Peterborough terminus. On 7 August 1850 the GNR completed its line from London (Maiden Lane) to Werrington Junction, and its trains transferred to its own route; the Werrington connection was removed. The GNR opened its own station, which much later became known as Peterborough North, and is the present-day Peterborough station. The GNR main line to Retford was opened on 15 July 1852 for goods trains, and 1 August 1852 for passengers.

This meant that there were two major railway stations in Peterborough, some distance apart. The two routes had run alongside one another from Helpston, a distance of about seven miles. Moreover the Midland Railway trains passed the GNR station on the journey to the ECR station in Peterborough.

This caused complaint from passengers intending to travel to London by changing to a GNR train, and between 1 February 1858 and 1 August 1866, the Midland Railway provided a station called Crescent. It was alongside the Great Northern Railway station; Midland trains called on the way to and from the GER (former Eastern Counties Railway) terminal. The Crescent station was closed when the Peterborough, Wisbech and Sutton Bridge Railway opened to passengers; Midland Railway passenger trains were permitted to call at the GNR station, where an additional platform had been provided. PW&SBR services continued to the GER station, enlarged by an island but still having only two main platform lines, until 30 September 1904.

== Later developments ==
=== Manton – Melton – Nottingham ===
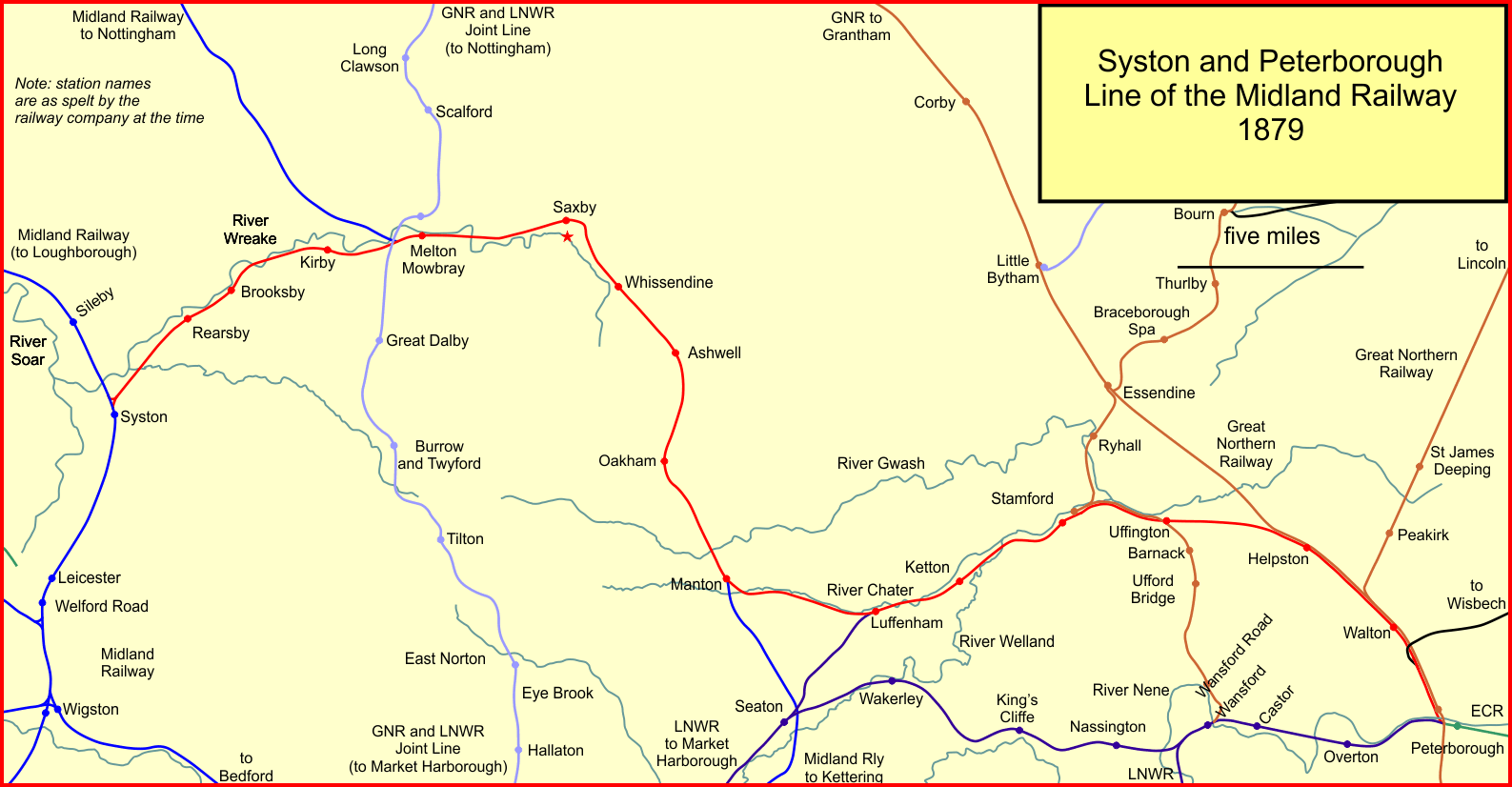
The Syston to Peterborough in 1879

As traffic developed, the Midland Railway found that the Leicester are became congested, and that a heavy and slow coal traffic and a frequent express passenger service were difficult to manage. The company decided on a new railway from Nottingham to Rushton, near Kettering, which was more direct. The new route joined the Syston line at Melton Mowbray, and it diverged again at Manton. The line opened to goods traffic on 1 November 1879, to local passenger trains on 2 February 1880, and to through express trains on 1 June 1880. In 1903 it was carrying over a dozen express and stopping trains each way daily.

=== The Midland and Great Northern Joint Line ===
The Eastern and Midland Railway had been formed by takeover of several smaller companies controlling the lines between Bourne and Lynn. In 1888, in collaboration with the Midland Railway, the E&MR proposed a line westwards from Bourne crossing the GNR main line south of Little Bytham station, where there would be a connecting junction and making an end-on junction with the existing MR mineral branch line at Cottesmore. This involved a commitment from the E&MR to favour the Midland over the GNR, and when parliamentary authorisation was sought, this favouritism caused the bill to be rejected.

A better approach was now adopted, in which the Midland Railway and the GNR collaborated in designing an alternative scheme. The E&MR was now in deep financial trouble and had to take a back seat. The new scheme would cross the GNR main line north of Little Bytham station and as before, have a connecting spur to it. As far as this point the line would be joint; the spur to the GNR would be GNR only, and the continuing line would be exclusively Midland Railway.

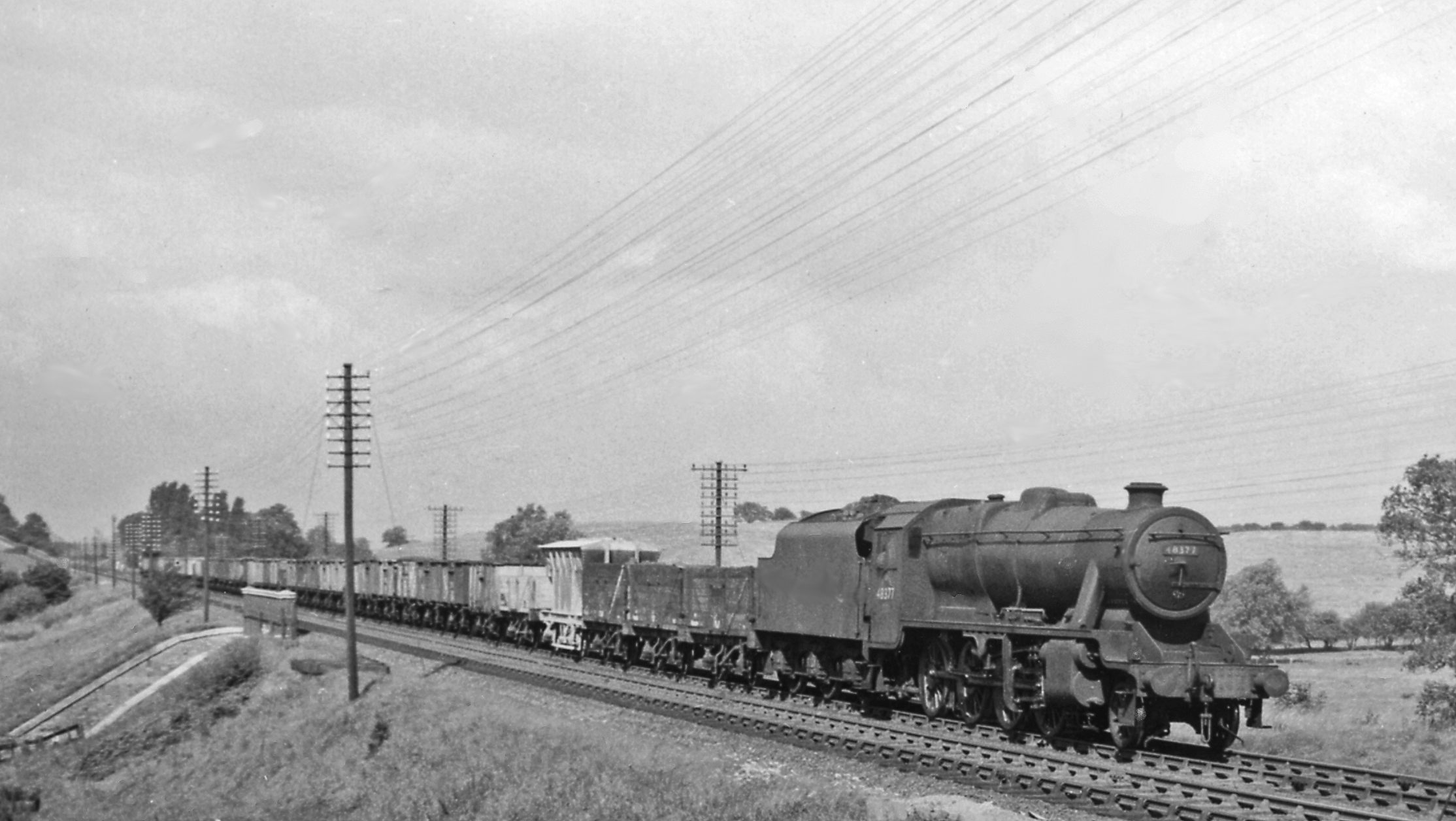
Up coal train approaching Manton

The alignment at Saxby, forced on the Midland Railway by Lord Harborough, was proving a significant hindrance to express trains on the route, and the scheme included the construction of an easier alignment as part of the new junction there. Plans for the new line were submitted for the 1889 parliamentary session. The bill passed as the Midland Railway Act 1889 (52 & 53 Vict. c. xxxix) being given royal assent on 24 June 1889. By this time it was obvious that the E&MR's financial problems were insuperable, and in 1891 the MR and GNR made an offer to take over the E&MR route jointly, and, after some negotiation, this offer was accepted. The new line was referred to as the Midland and Great Northern Joint Railway (M&GNJR). The committee of the M&GNJR took control on 1 July 1893. The Bourne to Saxby line had been opened to goods traffic on 4 June 1893. The dominant traffic was coal eastbound; passenger operation was delayed until 1 May 1894.

The Little Bytham Loop on to the GNR main line was not proceeded with, because the GNR considered their access to the joint line at Spalding sufficient, bearing in mind their other access point from Essendine.

=== Quadruple track ===
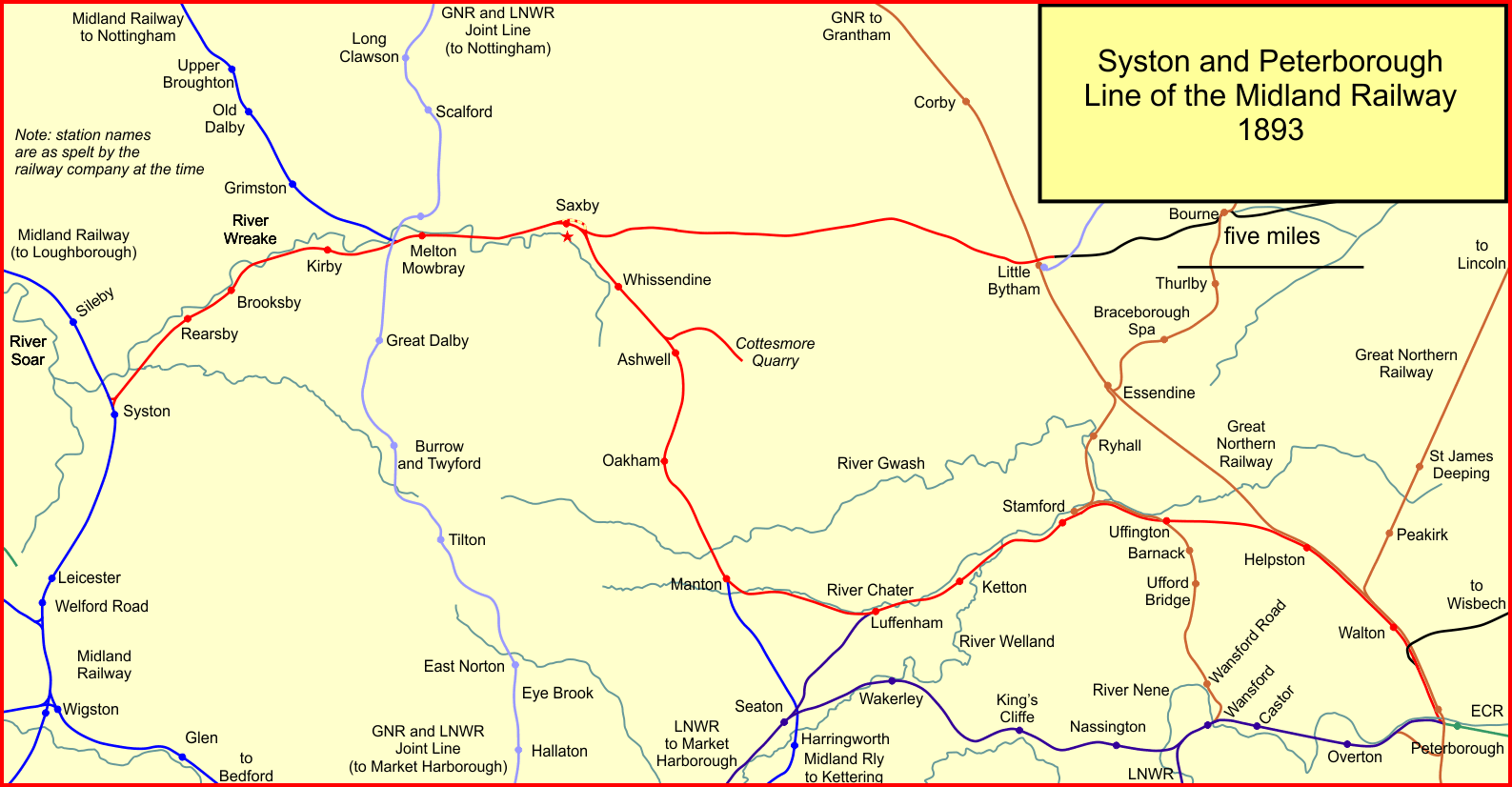
The Syston to Peterborough line in 1893

As traffic grew, congestion on the double track railway became an increasing issue. This was particularly the case after the 1880 transfer of the Nottingham express trains to the line, as the disparity in speed between an express passenger train and a slow mineral train almost always reduced line capacity considerably. The opening of the M&GN Joint Railway added to congestion. Although some widening projects were described as "quadrupling", the Midland actually installed a series on long goods loops (or in some cases passenger loops). The MR always called the end of a four track section a junction whether or not another route was joining the main line there.

As part of the work to improve the junction and alignment at Saxby in connection with the construction of the line to Bourne, a four track section was established, running from Saxby to Wymondham Junction. The work was probably completed in 1892 and may have been removed in 1961.

Manton station was provided with up platform loop lines, shown in 1885 and 1930 diagrams.

Loops were provided between Oakham and Langham Junction, from 15 March 1891.

In the first years of the twentieth century it was decided to install goods loops between Melton Mowbray and Brentingby Junction. These were commissioned on 4 December 1904. The line was straight and level at Brentingby so it was an ideal place to install water troughs, which was done on all four tracks, coming into use on 3 May 1905. The troughs on the goods lines were of limited use due to the slower speed of trains there and they were removed in 1926. (Note: It is remarkable that slow line troughs were installed at all. The quadrupling consisted of slow line loops, and trains using them must have stood at the exit signal, for other trains to pass; they could have taken water there, from a column. The only exception would have been slow passenger trains being overtaken by an express, that might not have been properly delayed in the loop, but could have taken water at the Melton station call afterwards (for down trains) or before (for up trains).) On the main line the troughs remained in use until steam traction finished, and they were removed around 1966. The Brentingby Junction signal box remained open until 25 June 1978, when the loops were shortened and worked from Melton signal box.

=== Cottesmore iron ore ===
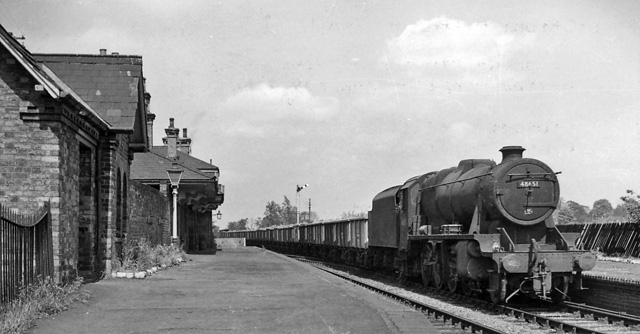
An iron ore train at Brooksby

Iron ore was found in the area crossed by the Syston and Peterborough line when the line to Nottingham was being excavated in 1878. Holwell ironworks was established to extract the mineral, at first brought to Ashwell station by horse and cart. A branch line to Cottesmore sidings opened on 27 November 1882, running from Ashwell Junction. Within the quarry area there was a network of narrow gauge lines to the quarry faces. The branch was always for mineral traffic only. The line closed on 13 March 1972; the quarry was unable to compete with cheap imported ore. A signal box was erected at Ashwell Junction in 1919, but it was never commissioned, the points being worked from a ground frame.

=== ROF Queniborough ===
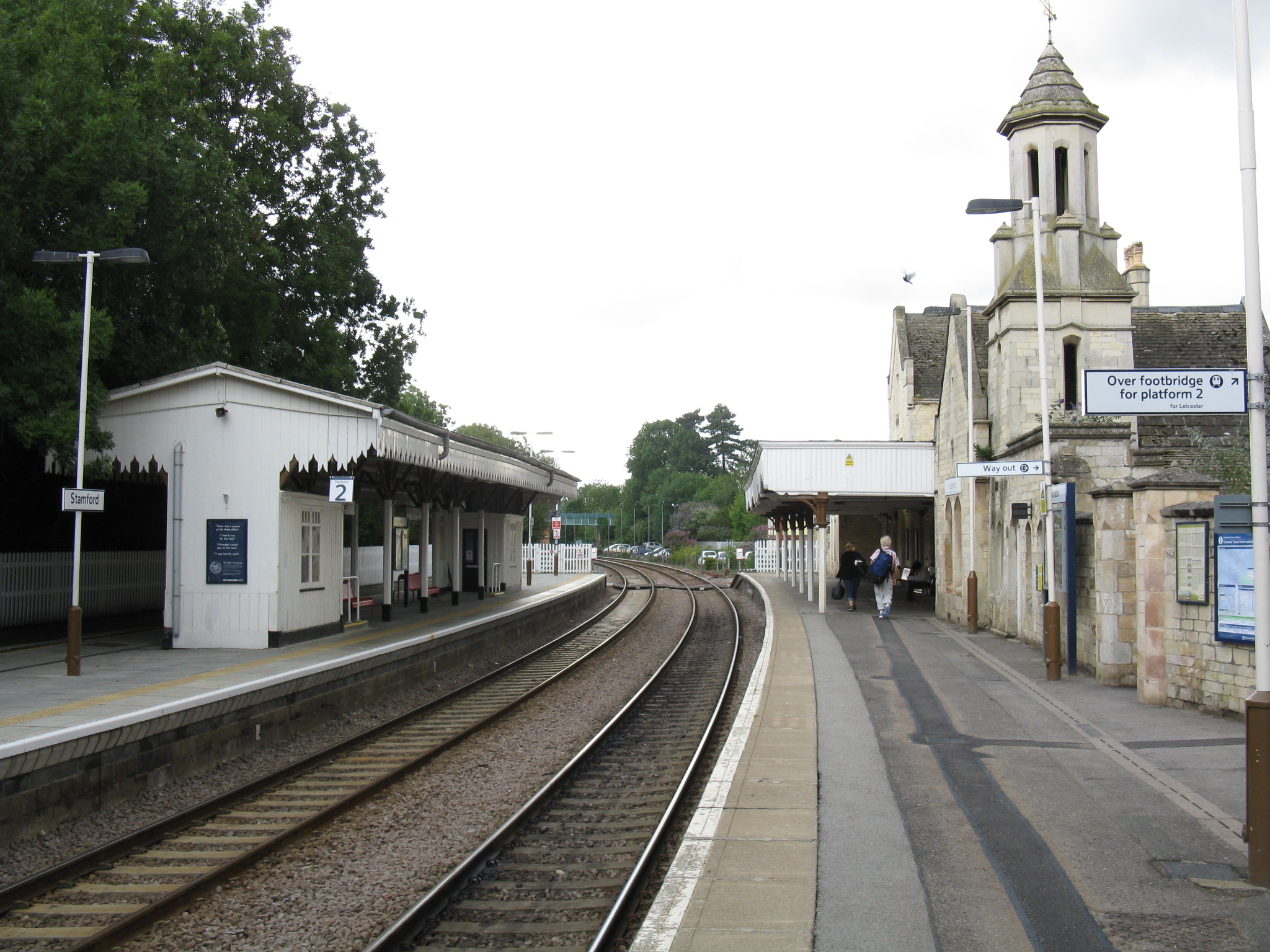
Stamford railway station in modern times

During World War II a Royal Ordnance Factory filling station, ROF No 10, was established at Queniborough. It was rail connected on the south-east side of the line about two miles from Syston. Construction started in 1940 and it was producing output in 1942; the railway connections were commissioned on 9 November 1941. Workers’ trains were run into the site, and passenger platforms were provided. It was decommissioned in 1959, and the railway facilities were removed on 8 February 1970. The area has now been developed as a domestic housing and light industrial estate, known as East Goscote.

== Passenger train services ==
Before the 1872 opening of the Nottingham direct line, the train service was limited to five trains each way daily, two on Sundays, with some short workings.

After the opening of the Nottingham line, it is not obvious (from Bradshaw) that the route was excessively congested, and that may point to a heavy mineral and goods service. A summer timetable after opening of the M&GNJR shows a number of through services along the Norfolk Coast.

== Present day passenger service ==
Although many local passenger stations have been closed, the line continues to support a good passenger train service. In 2022, typical weekday services run hourly from Stansted Airport or Cambridge to Birmingham and back. Syston north curve has two regular workings, the 04:56 and 06:07 Nottingham to Norwich trains run by that route Mondays to Fridays, a few minutes later on Saturdays. Liverpool to Norwich trains generally run via Nottingham and Grantham, but in the event of engineering works blocking that route, the trains are often diverted by Syston north curve.

== Locations ==
- Midland main line opened 1840; Syston station opened 5 May 1840; closed 4 March 1968; re-opened 30 May 1994; still open;
- Syston (South Junction)
  - Syston north curve West Junction to East Junction; opened 1854; still open;
- Queniborough; Royal Ordnance Factory workers' station; opened 10 November 1941; closed about 1949;
- Rearsby; opened 1 September 1846; closed 2 April 1951;
- Brooksby; opened 1 September 1846; closed 3 July 1961;
- Frisby; opened 1 January 1847; closed 3 July 1961;
- Asfordby; opened 1 September 1846; renamed Kirby 1 December 1857; closed 2 April 1951;
- Melton Junction; connection from the Nottingham line, 1879 - 1968;
- Melton station junction; connection from the GN and LNW Joint Line, 1883 – 1887
- Melton; opened 1 September 1846; moved to permanent premises 1 May 1848; renamed Melton Mowbray 1 November 1876; renamed Melton Mowbray South 1923; renamed Melton Mowbray Midland 25 September 1950; renamed Melton Mowbray 14 June 1965; still open;
- Saxby; opened February 1849; relocated when line diverted 28 August 1892;
- Saxby Junction; branch to Little Bytham 1893 – 1966;
  - Edmondthorpe & Wymondham; opened 1 May 1894; closed 2 March 1959;
  - Buckminster siding;
  - South Witham; opened 1 May 1894; closed 2 March 1959;
  - Castle Bytham; opened 4 April 1898; closed 2 March 1959;
  - End-on junction to former Eastern and Western Railway, now Midland and Great Northern Joint Railway, 1893 - 1959;
- Wymondham; opened 1 May 1848; renamed Whisendine September 1848; spelling altered to Whissendine 1 October 1878; closed 3 October 1955;
- Ashwell Branch Junction;
  - Cottesmore Quarry, 1882 – 1973;
- Ashwell; opened 1 May 1884; closed 6 June 1966;
- Oakham; opened 1 May 1848; still open;
- Manton; opened 1 May 1848; closed 6 June 1966; junction to Corby 1879 to 1966; reopened 1987;
- Luffenham; opened 1 May 1848; closed 6 June 1966;
- Ketton; opened 1 May 1848; renamed Ketton & Collyweston 8 July 1935; closed 6 June 1966;
- Stamford; second station; opened 23 June 1848; still open;
- Stamford; first station east of tunnel opened 2 October 1846; closed 23 June 1848;
- Uffington; opened 2 October 1846; renamed Uffington & Barnack 1 February 1858; closed 1 September 1952;
- Bainton Gate; opened 1 November 1854; closed July 1856;
- Helpston; opened 2 October 1846; closed 6 June 1966;
- Walton; opened 2 October 1846; closed 7 December 1953;
- Wisbech Junction; junction from Wisbech line, 1866 – 1961;
- Peterborough Crescent; opened February 1858; closed 1 August 1866;
- Nene Junction;
- Junction; connection from L&BR line from Northampton, 1845 – 1972;
- Peterborough; Eastern Counties Railway station opened 2 June 1845; renamed Peterborough East 1 July 1923; closed 6 June 1966.
