= Church of St Mary the Virgin, South Luffenham =

Church in Rutland, England

Coordinates: 52°36′24″N 0°36′41″W

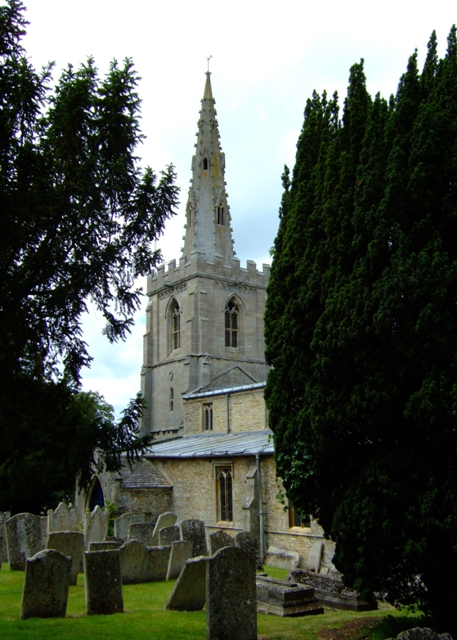
- Denomination: Church of England

History
- Dedication: St Mary the Virgin

Administration
- Diocese: Peterborough
- Parish: South Luffenham, Rutland

Clergy
- Rector: John Saunders

The Church of St Mary the Virgin is a church in South Luffenham, Rutland. It is a Grade II* listed building.

== History ==
The church consists of a chancel and a nave, which both have clerestories, south porch, south chapel, north and south aisles, tower and spire.

The church was majorly rebuilt in the 14th century. In the 15th century the clerestory in the chancel was added.

The font dates to the 14th century. Also dating from the 14th century, is a table tomb in the chancel of a man in civil costume. The family arms of Culpepper is on the western panel. The chancel was restored in 1850.

G. E. Street restored the church in 1861, when the chancel floor was raised and the tower arch opened up.

The chapel contains a slab to the daughter of Edward Boswell, a ‘King of the Gypsies’, Rose Boswell. They set up a camp in the parish at Christmas 1793, and Rose became ill with tuberculosis. She died on 19 February 1794, aged 17, and is buried in the south aisle. The marble slab, carved in London, and was subscribed by the many gypsies who converged from afar to express sympathy with their "king". The inscription is still faintly discernible:

“In memory of Rose Boswell, daughter of Edward and Sarah Boswell, who died February 19th, 1794, aged 17 years. What grief can vent this loss, or praises tell, how much, how good, how beautiful she fell.”

== Clergy ==
- Robert Cawdrey, compiler of one of the first dictionaries of the English language, the Table Alphabeticall, became rector in 1571 but was deprived in 1587 for his puritan sympathies.
- Owen Gwyn, Master of St John's College, Cambridge from 1612 and Vice-Chancellor of the University of Cambridge 1615–16, was instituted Rector 28 October 1611, remaining in office until his death in 1633.
- Robert Scott, (1811–1887) the co-editor with Henry George Liddell of a Greek-English Lexicon, the standard dictionary of Ancient Greek, was rector here for four years before he was elected Master of Balliol College, Oxford in 1854. Balliol held the advowson from 1855 and many of the priests appointed were fellows of the college and noted scholars.
- James Stephen Hodson, who was rector 1877–81, is commemorated here along with his brother William Stephen Raikes Hodson (1821–1858), a soldier prominent in the Indian Mutiny - "Hodson of Hodson's Horse".
