= Francis Mark Farmer =

Dental surgeon and lecturer

Sir Francis Mark Farmer (7 October 1866 – 24 December 1922) was a dental surgeon and lecturer on dental surgery and pathology at the London Hospital. He made contributions on facial restoration after gunshot wounds.

== Early life ==
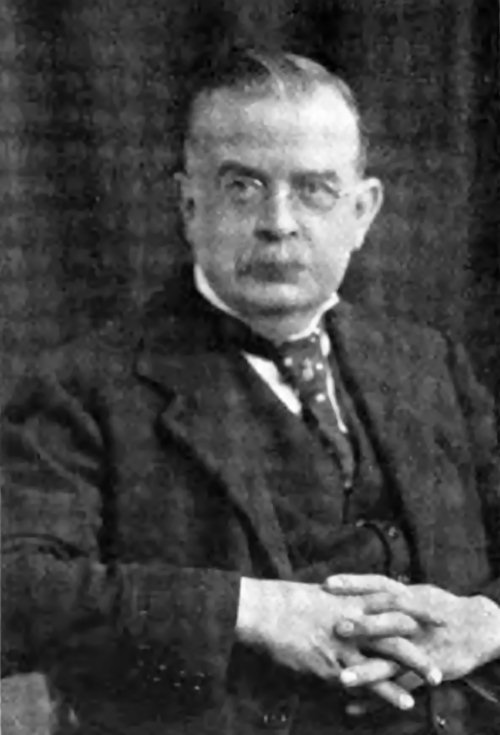
Sir Francis Mark Farmer

He was born at Bray, County Wicklow, Ireland, in 1866. His family later moved to Chelsea where in 1881 he was in an apprenticeship with a dentist. He qualified in 1894 after studying at the National Dental Hospital and at Middlesex Hospital. He was Dental Surgeon to St. Edward's School, Totteridge, and to St. Hilda's Home for Waifs and Strays.

== Career ==
His work on facial reconstruction in the Boer War was recognised in 1902 by the Secretary for War with a silver service.

He had an office at 17, Great Marlborough Street and later at 53, Wimpole Street, London. In 1911 he was a founder member of the London Dental School. The Dental School of the London Hospital Medical College opened in 1911 to provide specialised treatment to patients and training and research opportunities. Surgeon Dentists had been appointed by the Hospital from 1857, and a Dental Department established.

He worked at Queen Alexandra Military Hospital, Millbank, which was a major hospital for jaw injuries. He was appointed consulting dental surgeon to the London Hospital in 1899 and to the Queen's Facial Hospital, Sidcup. At the Queen's Hospital, Sidcup, he worked alongside Sir Harold Gillies. He was knighted in the 1916 Birthday Honours for his services in World War I. He served from 1917 in the Royal Army Medical Corps as a temporary Honorary Major. In 1900 he donated his dental collection to the London Hospital.

He was a Fellow of the Royal Society of Medicine, the British Dental Association and the British Society for the Study of Orthodontics.

== Personal life ==
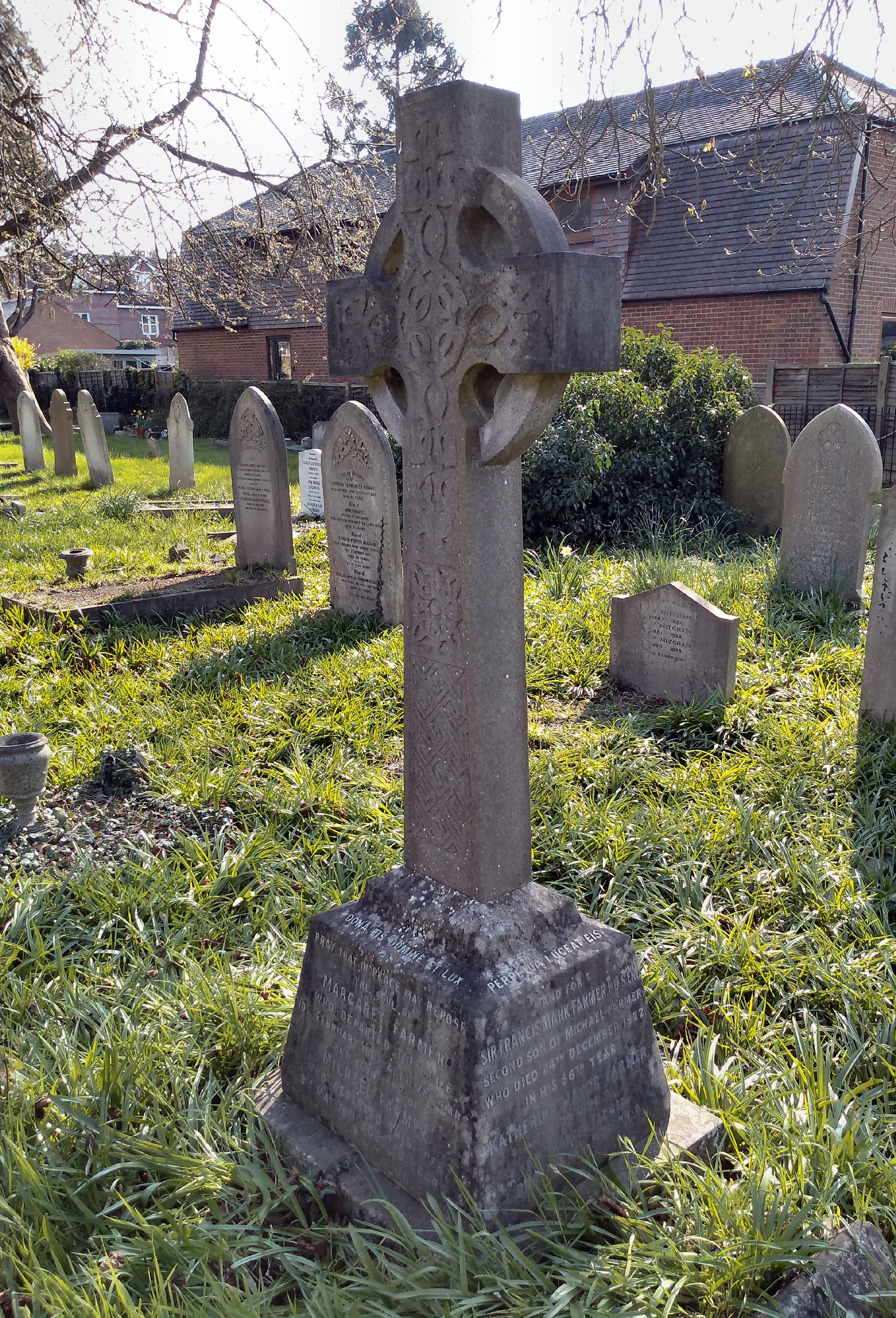
Hampton Cemetery

He lived at St. Winifred's, 39 Belgrade Road, Hampton, where his father Michael had moved in 1888. In 1909, at Paddington, he married Gwendoline Mary Winstanley, who died on 1 October 1914. They had two children, Margaret Jessie (b 1910) and Edmund (b 1911). In 1922, he married his second wife, Kate Mayor Thomas (1874-1957) in West Derby. Later that same year, he died suddenly of a heart attack at Hampton. On 28 December there was a solemn requiem at Brompton Oratory, where he had once been a choir boy, followed by burial at Hampton Cemetery. Queen Alexandra sent a wreath inscribed "For my dear Sir Francis Farmer, with deepest regret and sorrow." Princess Victoria sent a spray of flowers from Sandringham.

His widow, Dame Kate Mayor Farmer, died at St Winifred's, Hampton, on 8 December 1957.

== Legacy ==
In 1924 a memorial mural tablet was unveiled at the London Hospital Medical College and an endowment scholarship set up in his memory. At the unveiling Mr Asquith said that in the particular branch of surgery to which Sir Francis was devoted he was certainly not surpassed by any of his contemporaries.

FRANCIS FARMER
This tablet is put up
in the place where much of his life work
was done
to keep alive the memory of
a brilliant surgeon
devoted to his profession and his patients
never sparing himself
where he could serve others
most loyal of colleagues
most unselfish of friends
