= Luffenham Heath Golf Course =

Golf course in Rutland, England

Coordinates: 52.61°N 0.587°W

- Site of Special Scientific Interest
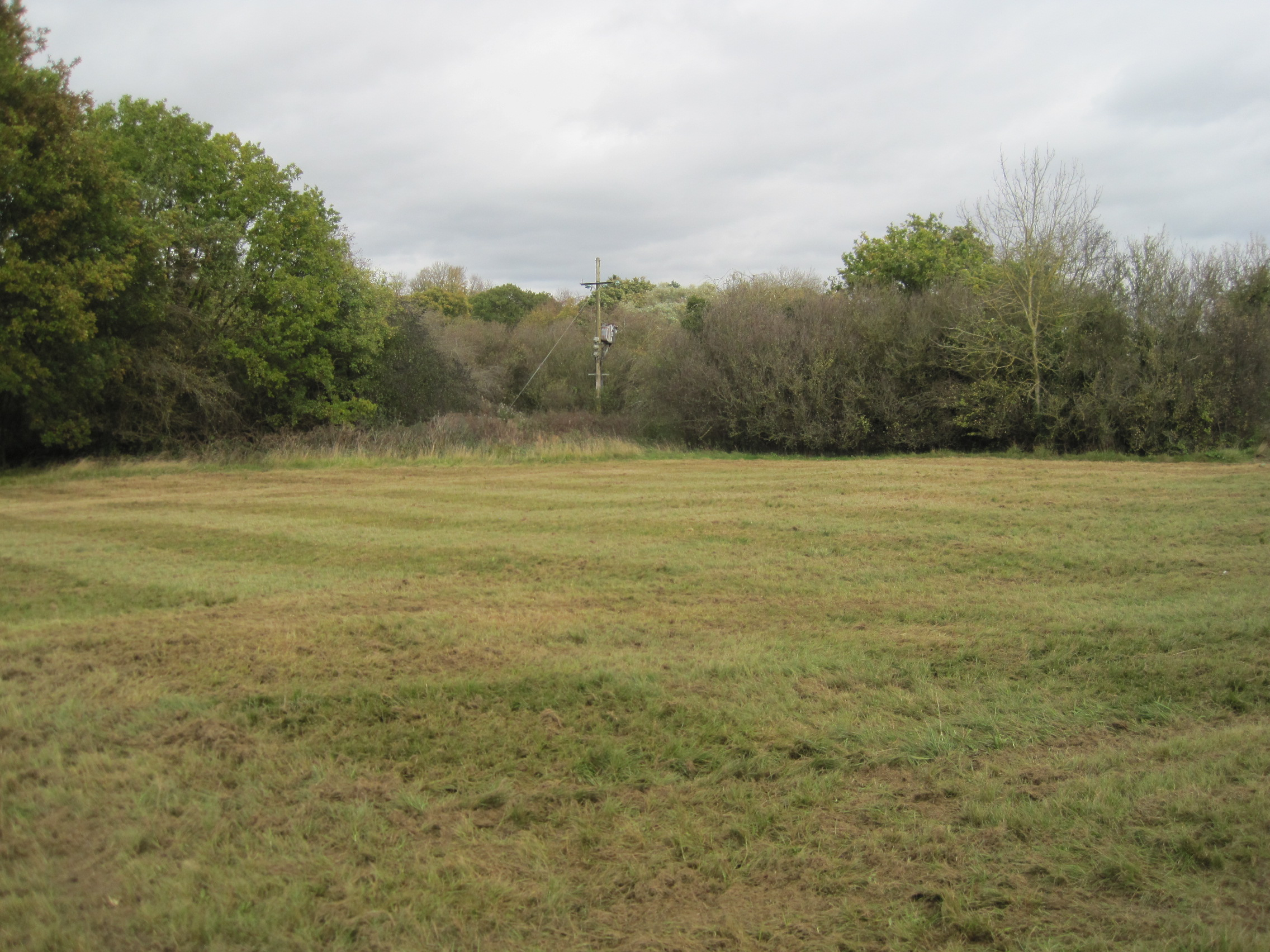
- Location of Luffenham Heath Golf Course.
- Area of search: Rutland
- Grid reference: SK 958 023
- Interest: Biological
- Area: 75.1 hectares
- Notification date: 1983
- Location map: Magic Map

Luffenham Heath Golf Course is a 75.1-hectare (186-acre) biological Site of Special Scientific Interest east of South Luffenham in Rutland. It is the course of Luffenham Heath Golf Club.

The course is located on several soil types, including calcareous grassland on Jurassic Lower Lincolnshire Limestone, together with acid heath, scrub and broad-leaved woodland. The dominant grasses are tor-grass and upright brome, and the site is notable for its butterflies its diverse insect species.
