= River Chater =

River in Leicestershire and Rutland, England

Chater
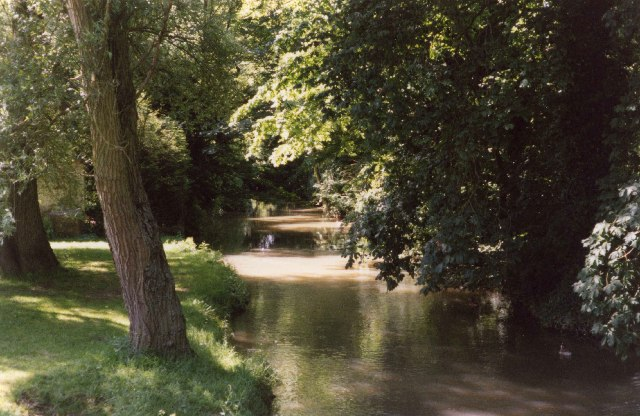
- The Chater at Ketton

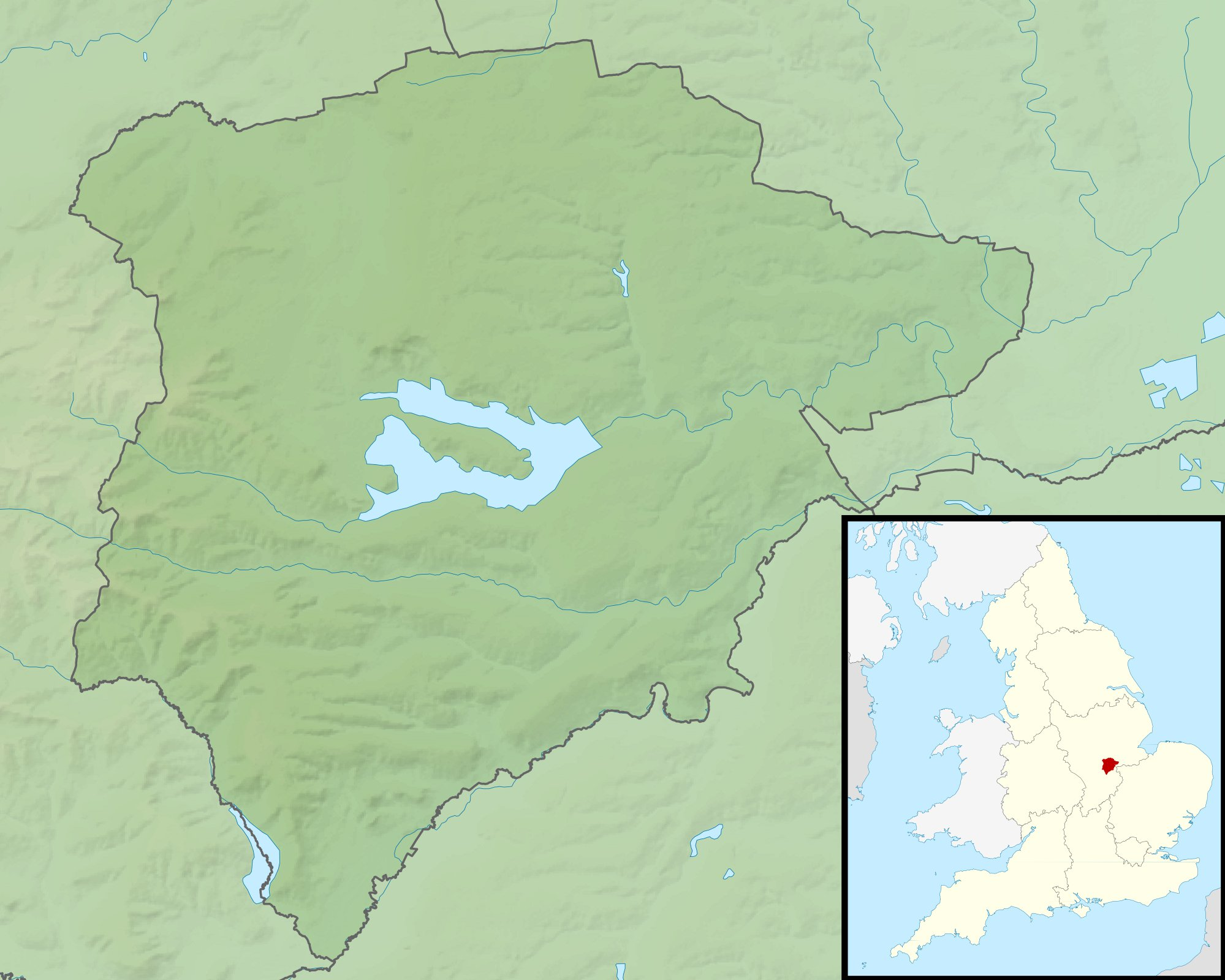
- Location of the river mouth in Rutland

Location
- Country: England
- Counties: Rutland, Leicestershire

Physical characteristics
- Source
  - location: Whatborough Hill, Leicestershire
  - coordinates: 52.641539°N 0.862270°W
  - elevation: 182 m (597 ft)
- Mouth: River Welland
  - location: Tinwell, Rutland
  - coordinates: 52.640648°N 0.521143°W
  - elevation: 30 m (98 ft)
- Length: 35 km (22 mi)

Basin features
- River system: River Welland
- Tributaries
  - right: Morcott Brook

The River Chater is a river in the East Midlands of England. It is a tributary of the River Welland, and is about 22 miles (35 km) long.

== Course ==
It rises near Whatborough Hill in Leicestershire, and then flows east, past Sauvey Castle and Launde Abbey, before crossing into Rutland. Chater Valley is a 3.8-hectare (9.4-acre) biological Site of Special Scientific Interest north of Loddington, Leicestershire. The river continues east, to the north of Ridlington, Preston, and then to the south of Manton and the north of Wing. North-east of South Luffenham, it is joined by the Morcott Brook. It continues north-east, going under the A6121 road at Foster's Bridge and through Ketton, before meeting the River Welland near Tinwell.

The river drains an area of 19 square miles (49 km^{2}) that is mostly clay, but with limestone and sandstone in certain areas. The catchment is rural, with mixed farming and woodland in its lower reaches. Originally, the project for the massive reservoir of Rutland Water considered damming the valley of the Chater, but the underlying geology was not conducive for this. Additionally, the available land space would have made the reservoir smaller than the eventual site of Rutland Water.

== Wildlife ==
The river holds a variety of fish species, including roach, dace and chub. White-clawed crayfish are known to be in the river, which puts them at risk, as invasive species of crayfish are known to be in the Welland.

== History ==
Mills used the river to power waterwheels, usually for grinding corn. The last watermill operating on the river was at South Luffenham in 1948, when the leat was damaged and never repaired.

== Etymology ==
Chater is a pre-English river name of uncertain etymology. Eilert Ekwall suggests it derives from Brittonic ceto-dubron meaning forest stream.

Ketton, a village that the river flows past, takes its name from the Chater.
