= Chater Valley =

Site of Special Scientific Interest in Leicestershire, United Kingdom

Coordinates: 52.632°N 0.816°W

- Site of Special Scientific Interest
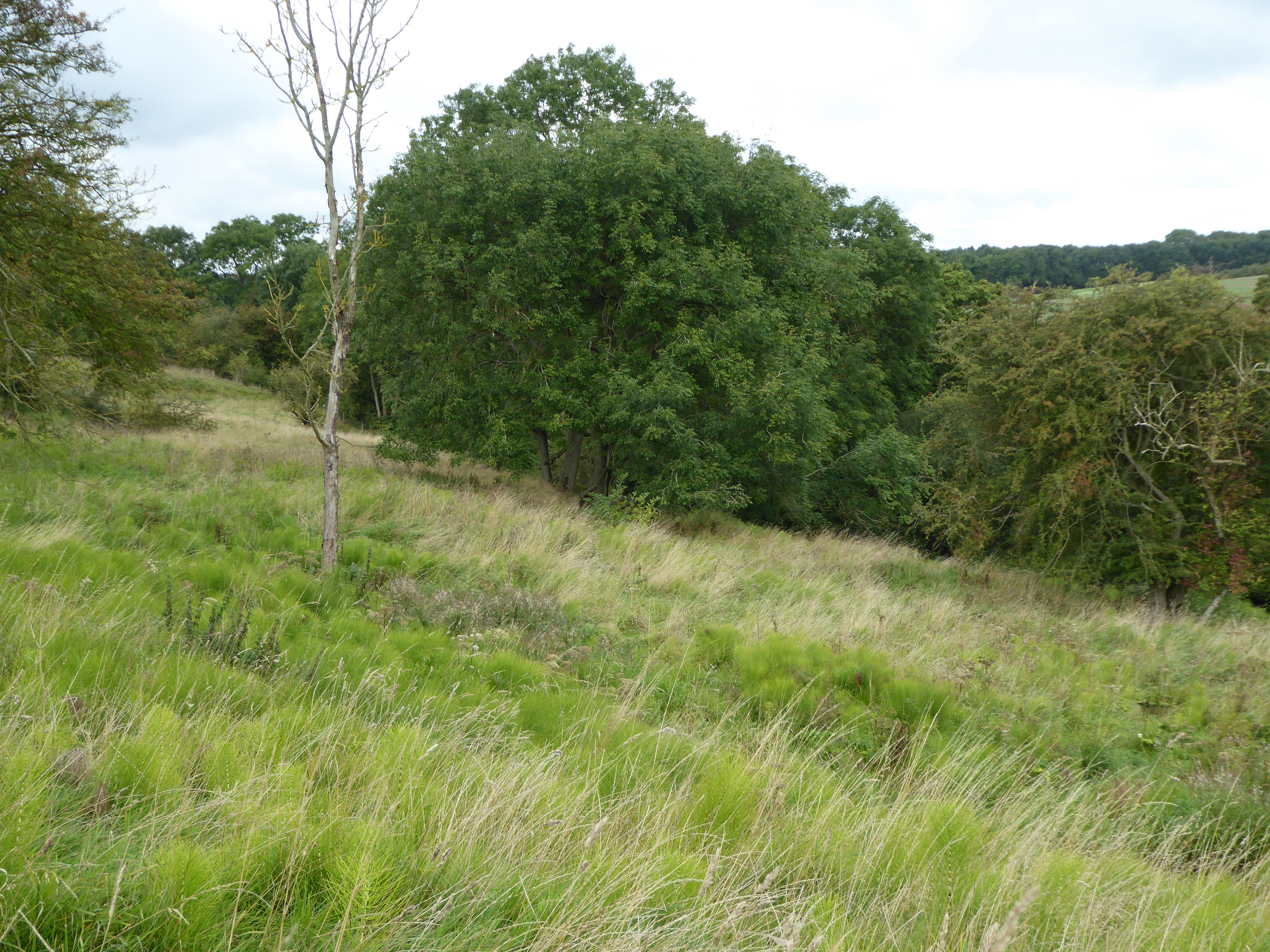
- Location of Chater Valley.
- Area of search: Leicestershire
- Grid reference: SK 804 044
- Interest: Biological
- Area: 3.8 hectares
- Notification date: 1983
- Location map: Magic Map

Chater Valley is a 3.8-hectare (9.4-acre) biological Site of Special Scientific Interest north of Loddington in Leicestershire.

This steeply sloping stretch of the valley of the River Chater is a semi-natural mosaic of grassland and spring-fed marsh. There are diverse breeding birds, invertebrates and herbs, including tormentil, betony and one of the few populations in the county of moonwort.

The site is private land with no public access.
