= Luffenham Heath Golf Club =

Golf course in South Luffenham, Rutland, England

Coordinates: 52.616°N 0.580°W

Luffenham Heath is an 18-hole golf course near South Luffenham in Rutland, England. Designed by Harry Colt, it began under the patronage of the Earl of Ancaster who had exchanged fields in South Luffenham for common land on the heath.

The opening event in 1911, witnessed by over a thousand spectators, was an exhibition match between James Braid and Harry Vardon.

The club initially attracted an aristocratic membership. Viscount Castlereagh was club captain in 1912 and 1932, on the latter occasion bearing the title of Marquis of Londonderry. In 1928, the Prince of Wales, who later became King Edward VIII, was invited to become captain. The club applied to be allowed to add the word Royal as a prefix to the club's name, but the request was refused.

In January 1921, fire destroyed the workshop, showroom, and caddy's hut at the Golf Club, having been started by a spark from a stove in the workshop.

Luffenham Heath Golf Course is a biological Site of Special Scientific Interest.
