= James Stephen Hodson =

British clergyman and academic

James Stephen Hodson (1816–1890) was an English academic and Anglican priest who served as rector of Edinburgh Academy from 1854 to 1869.

== Life ==
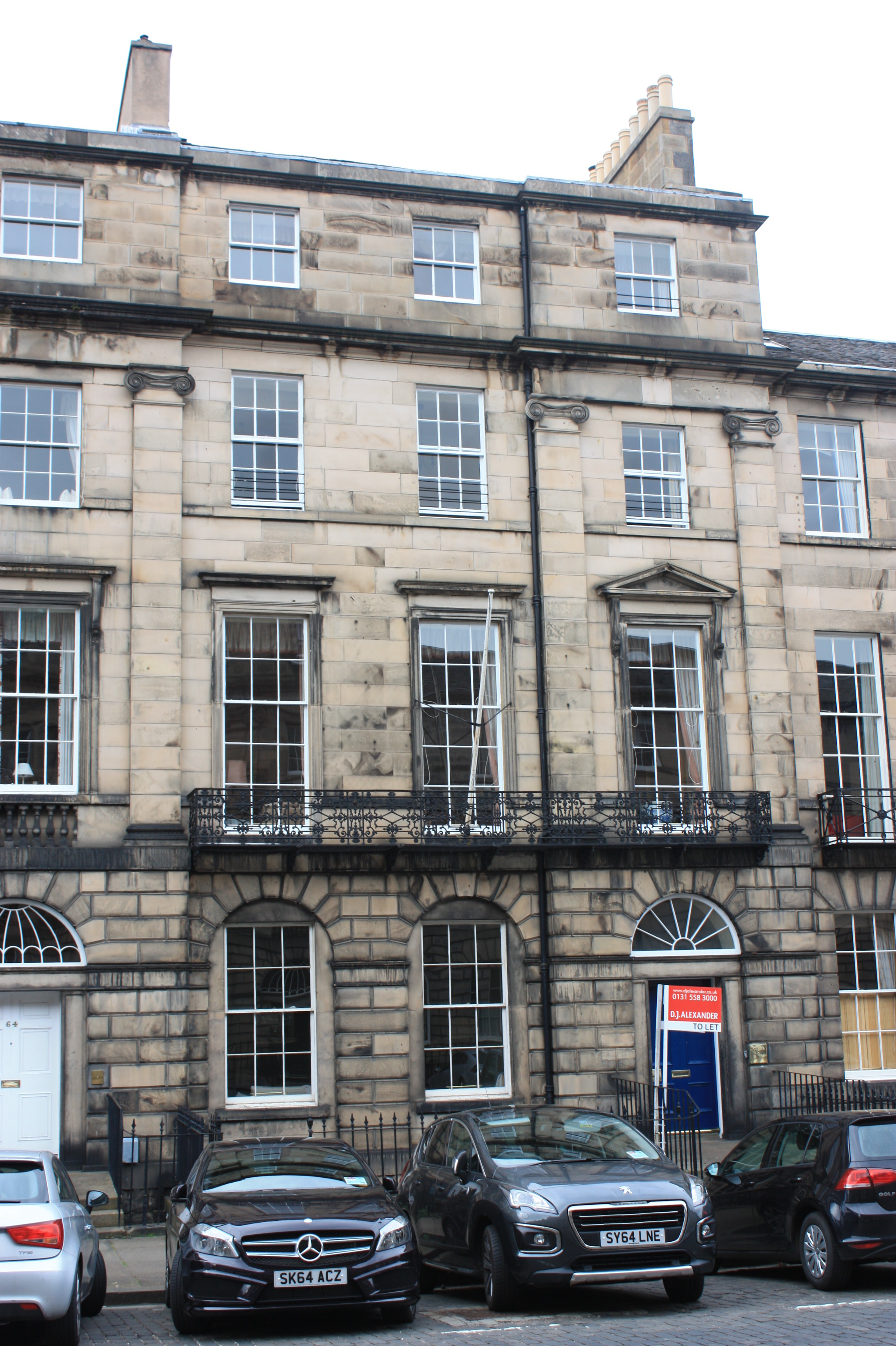
62 Great King Street, Hodson's Edinburgh home

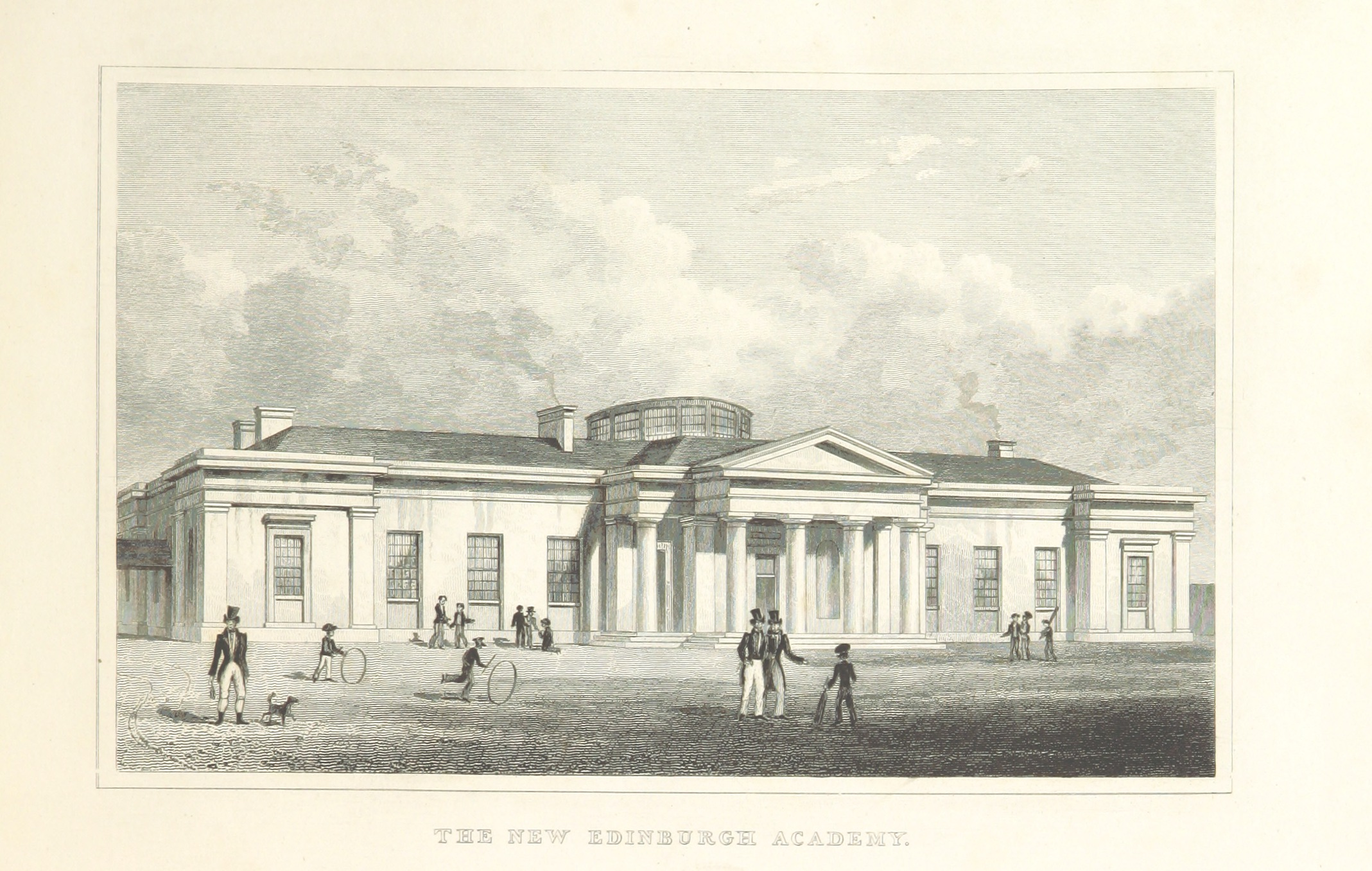
A historic print of Edinburgh Academy

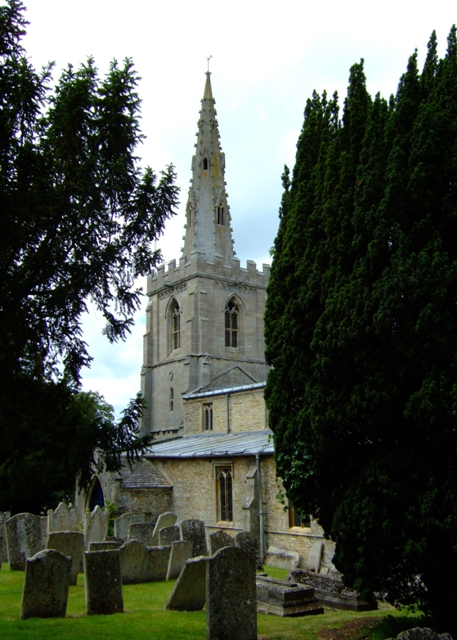
Church of St Mary the Virgin, South Luffenham

He was born in Clifton, Bristol, in 1816 or 1817, the eldest son of George Hodson (1787–1855), later archdeacon of Stafford and chancellor of Lichfield Cathedral. His mother was Mary Stephen. A younger brother was William Stephen Raikes Hodson, who adopted a military career and founded Hodsons Horse Regiment.

Hodson studied divinity at Balliol College and Merton College in Oxford, graduating in 1837. He served as a curate at Sanderstead in Croydon. He moved to be perpetual curate of St Giles' Church, Longstone in Derbyshire around 1847. During this period he is listed as a member of the British Archaeological Association.

He succeeded John Hannah (1818–1888) as rector of Edinburgh Academy in 1855. For his time as rector of Edinburgh Academy he was living at 62, Great King Street (the former home of Robert Graham) in Edinburgh's Second New town.

In 1855 he was elected a fellow of the Royal Society of Edinburgh, his proposer being James Russell. He resigned in 1873.

He was succeeded as rector in 1869 by Thomas Harvey (1823–1901). From 1867 to 1870 he served as chaplain to the bishop of Edinburgh, Charles Terrot. In 1870 he left Edinburgh to take on the role of headmaster of Bradfield College in Berkshire.

In 1872 he became vicar of Steventon, Oxfordshire (then in Berkshire) and in 1877, vicar of South Luffenham in Rutland. In 1881, he took on his final role, as rector of Sanderstead.

He died at Sanderstead Rectory on 20 November 1890, aged 74.

== Publications ==
- Comfort Amidst Sorrow (1845)

== Family ==
He married Elizabeth Dorrill Vernon (second daughter of B. J. Vernon) in 1840 at St Mary le Strand in London. Elizabeth was born in 1820 in St Helena. They had six children: Sibella Vernon Hudson (died in infancy), Vernon James Hodson (1842–1864), Edith Vernon Hodson (1844–1932), Sibella Mary Hodson (1846–1910), Hubert Courtney Hodson (1847–1924), and Arthur Vernon Hodson (died in infancy). Vernon, served as a lieutenant in the European Light Cavalry during the Indian Mutiny, and died in Dinapore in India aged only 21.
