= George Hodson (priest) =

Archdeacon of Stafford 1829–1855

The Ven. George Hodson (1788–1855) was an English Archdeacon of Stafford from 9 May 1829 to his death from cholera at Riva del Garda on 13 August 1855.

Hodson was born in Carlisle the youngest son of George, a merchant, and educated at Carlisle Grammar School. He matriculated at Trinity College, Cambridge in 1806 but migrated to Magdalene College in 1810. He was ordained a priest of the Church of England in 1812. He was a curate at Clifton, Bristol in 1815.

For a period Hodson was tutor to Albert Way, son of Lewis Way, at Stanstead Park. While this was teaching in a home environment, he gathered other pupils there, including in 1819 Samuel Wilberforce. In 1820 he became curate at Maisemore, and took a group of pupils with him, an arrangement that ran at least to 1822. Hodson became perpetual curate of Christ Church, Birmingham in 1824. He was vicar of St Michael & All Angels, Colwich, Staffordshire, from 1828 to 1851, then at St Mary's Church, Lichfield. He also served as Chancellor of Lichfield Cathedral from 1833.

He married in 1815, Mary Somersall, daughter of William Stephen, M.D., of Saint Kitts, West Indies. Among his children were Major William Stephen Raikes Hodson and Rev. Dr James Stephen Hodson.

A large monument to Archdeacon Hodson was erected in the south aisle of Lichfield Cathedral, near a memorial to his son Major Hodson.
