= Maisemore =

Village in Gloucestershire, England

Coordinates: 51.889°N 02.271°W

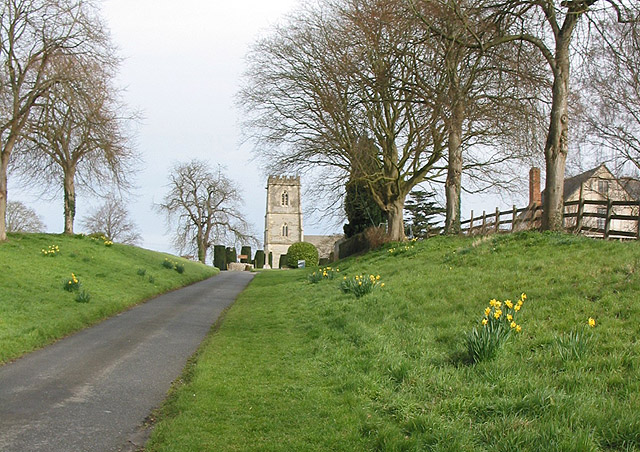
- St Giles Parish church

- Location within Gloucestershire
- Population: 458
- OS grid reference: SO814212
- District: Tewkesbury
- Shire county: Gloucestershire
- Region: South West
- Country: England
- Sovereign state: United Kingdom
- Post town: GLOUCESTER
- Postcode district: GL2
- Dialling code: 01452
- Police: Gloucestershire
- Fire: Gloucestershire
- Ambulance: South Western
- UK Parliament: Forest of Dean

Maisemore is a village and civil parish in Gloucestershire, England. It lies on the A417 road 2.5 miles (4 km) northwest of Gloucester, on the west bank of the River Severn. In the 2001 census the parish had a population of 488, reducing to 458 at the 2011 census.

The parish includes the hamlet of Overton, 1 mile (1.6 km) north west of the village.

== Geography ==
Maisemore Bridge connects the village to Alney Island, and provides a viewpoint for the Severn bore. Maisemore Weir and Lock were built in about 1870. The weir is at the upper limit of the tides on the Severn. The lock is no longer in use.

The area is prone to flooding, which from time to time closes the A417 between Maisemore and Gloucester, especially in the spring when the swollen River Severn meets high tides coming up the estuary.

== History ==
The name of the village appears to be of Welsh origin, meaning "great field" (Welsh: maes mawr). The northern part of Alney Island, which is within the parish of Maisemore, is known as Maisemore Ham, combining Welsh and Old English words for field or meadow (ham, meaning "meadow").

The village was originally around the church. Probably in the 14th century, the present linear village was replanned further south, leaving the church separated from its settlement.

== Notable buildings ==
The parish church, dedicated to St Giles, is a Grade II* listed building, dating from the 15th century.

Maisemore Court, near the church, is a former manor house, also a Grade II* listed building.

=== Maisemore Bridge ===
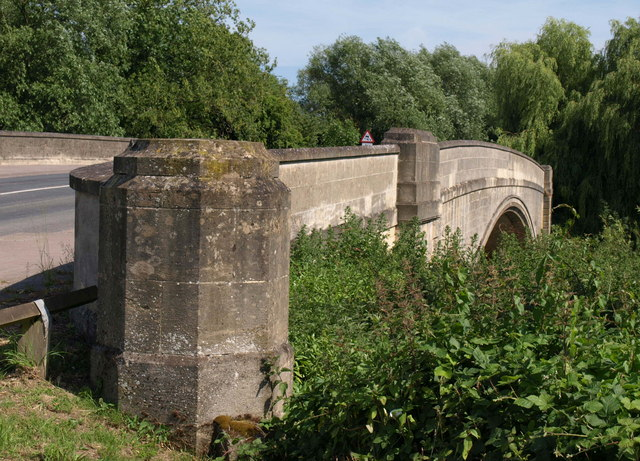
Maisemore Bridge

The construction of the current bridge was commenced in 1939 but was stopped during the war of 1939–45. It was completed in 1956.

The bridge stands on or near the site of at least six previous bridges. The first recorded one had a cross with an inscription stating it was begun by William Fitz Anketil circa A.D. 1230.

The next known bridge was recorded as "cut down" by royalist besiegers of Gloucester in 1643 which suggests it might have been a wooden structure: It is known to have been rebuilt of timber.

The parishioners of Maisemore were, by ancient custom, liable for the repair of the bridge, but this apparently proved beyond their means as in 1709, they were fined £200 for non-repair. At the same time the County Justices voted £200 towards "a good substantial brick and stone bridge". The latter was destroyed by great floods, and in 1777 trustees were established by an act of Parliament, the Maisemore Bridge Act 1777 (17 Geo. 3. c. 68), to build a new bridge in place of a temporary wooden one which had been built lower down the river. A new two-arch brick bridge was begun in 1785 by Thomas Badford, the cost being defrayed by tolls levied by the trustees until 1795.

The trustees continued to maintain the bridge until 1936, when by agreement their powers were ceded to the Gloucestershire County Council. This bridge was demolished in 1939 to make way for the present structure and a temporary timber bridge was erected which carried the traffic from 1939 to 1956.

== Notable residents ==
- Thomas Fulljames (1808–1874), architect
- J.J Cridlan (1887-1938) of Maisemore Park. One on the most famous breeders, exhibitors and judges of Aberdeen Angus cattle. The Maisemore herd was world renowned and Maisemore stock was sold all over the Empire.
- George Wilson Bridges was rector here in 1843 (where he found his interest in photography)
- William Stephen Raikes Hodson was born on 9 March 1821 at Maisemore Court, the third son of the curate, Rev. George Hodson.
