= Hampton Cemetery, London =

Cemetery in England

Coordinates: 51°25′17″N 0°22′26″W

Hampton Cemetery
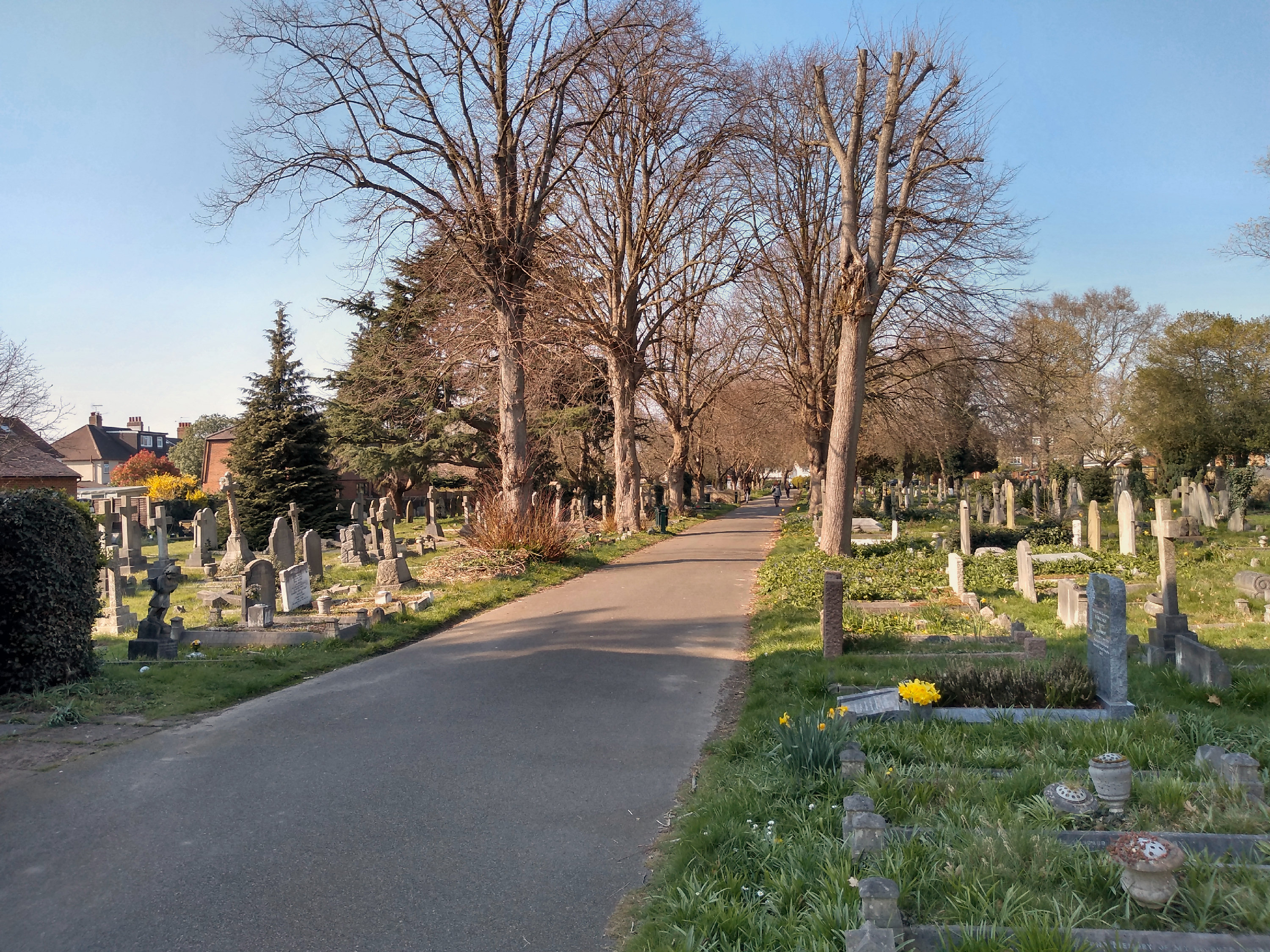
- Interactive map of Hampton Cemetery

Details
- Established: 1879
- Location: Hampton, London Borough of Richmond upon Thames
- Country: England
- Owned by: Richmond upon Thames Borough Council
- Website: Official website

Hampton Cemetery is a cemetery on Hollybush Lane in Hampton in the London Borough of Richmond upon Thames. It was opened in 1879 and is now managed by Richmond upon Thames London Borough Council. Fourteen Commonwealth service members of World War I and seven of World War II are buried in the cemetery.

== Notable burials and memorials ==
- Sir Francis Mark Farmer (1866–1922) was a dental surgeon and lecturer on dental surgery and pathology at the London Hospital who made contributions on facial restoration.
- There is a memorial to William Hodson (1821–1858) who was a British leader of irregular light cavalry during the Indian Mutiny; he is buried in Lucknow. His widow, Susan Annette Hodson (died 4 November 1884), who had a grace-and-favour apartment at Hampton Court Palace, is buried here.
- Eli Lemon Sheldon (1848–1892), a banker and author, husband of May French Sheldon, who died at Canister House, Hampton.
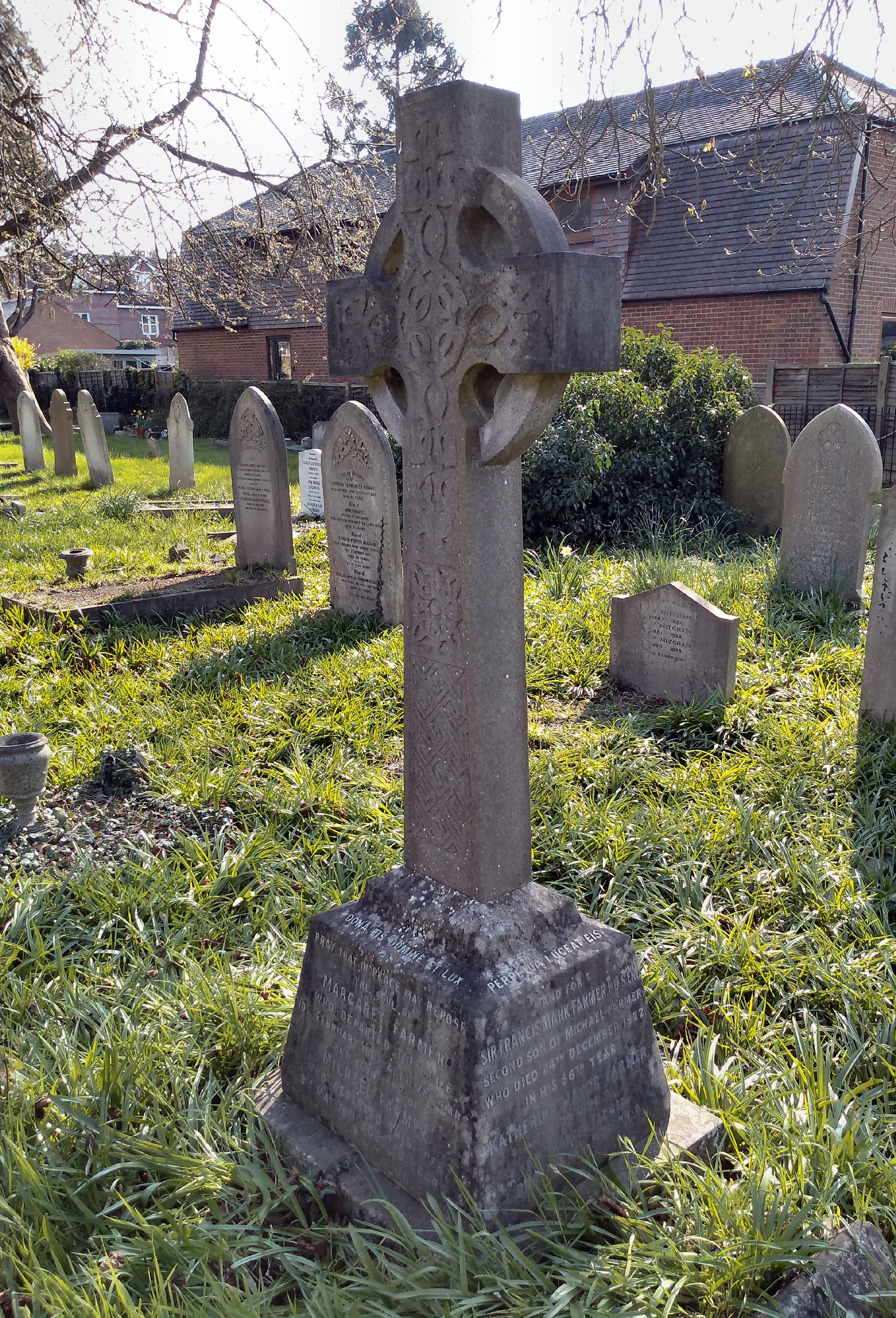
Grave of Sir Francis Mark Farmer

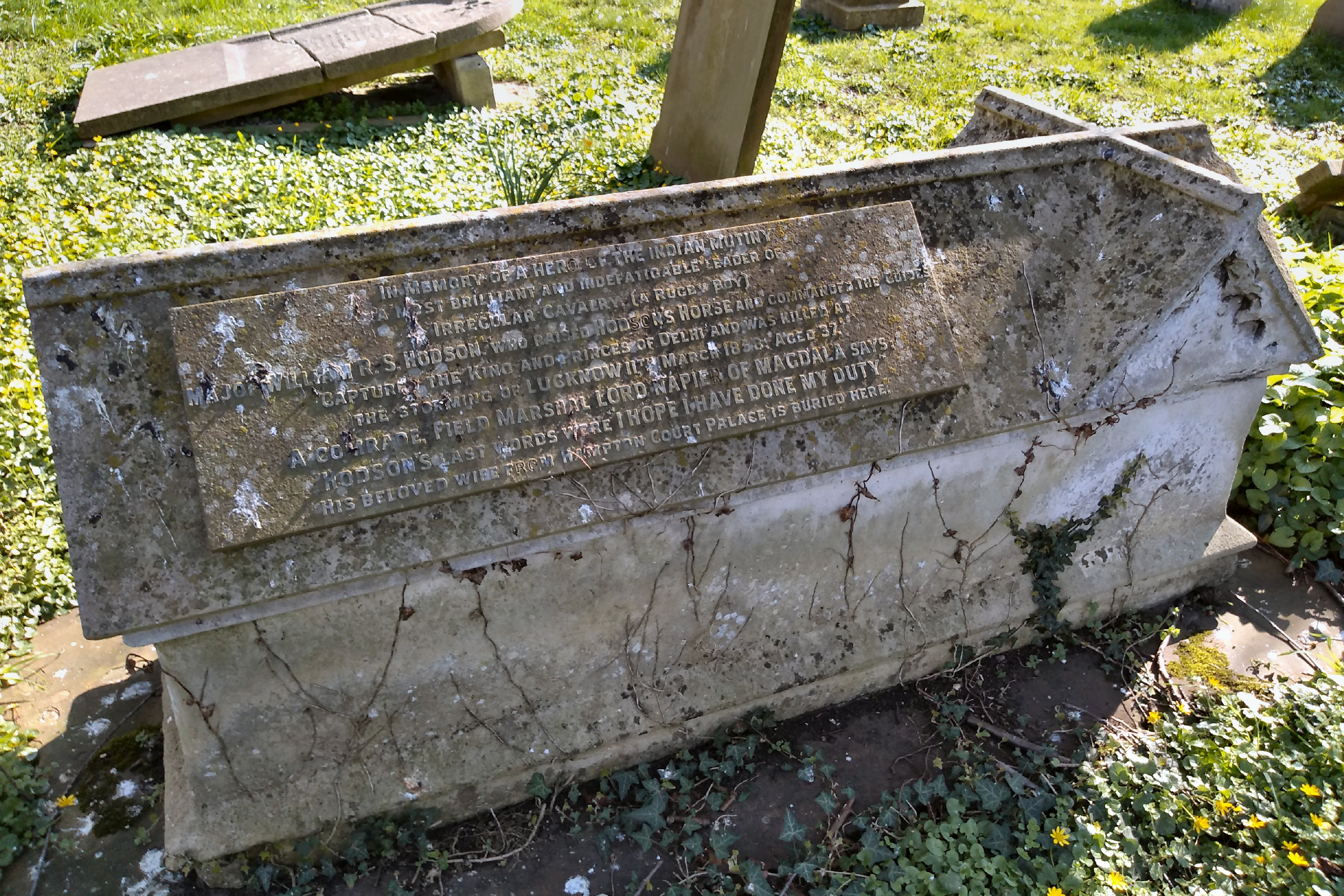
Memorial to William Hodson
