= South Luffenham =

Village in Rutland, England

Coordinates: 52.607°N 0.611°W

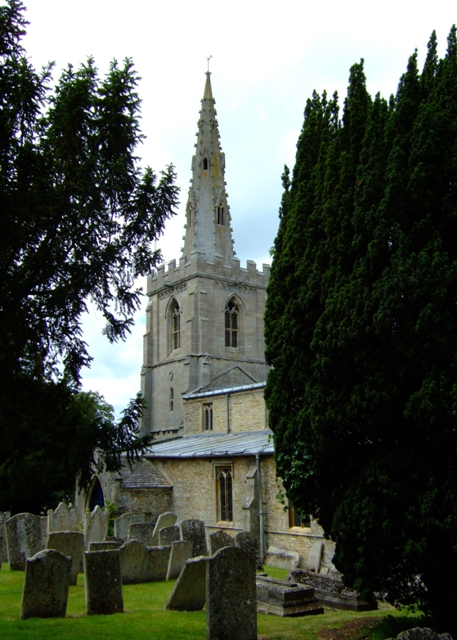
- Church of St Mary the Virgin, South Luffenham

- Location within Rutland
- Area: 2.25 sq mi (5.8 km^{2})
- Population: 432 2001 Census
  - Density: 192/sq mi (74/km^{2})
- OS grid reference: SK941019
  - London: 79 miles (127 km) SSE
- Unitary authority: Rutland
- Shire county: Rutland
- Ceremonial county: Rutland
- Region: East Midlands
- Country: England
- Sovereign state: United Kingdom
- Post town: OAKHAM
- Postcode district: LE15
- Dialling code: 01780
- Police: Leicestershire
- Fire: Leicestershire
- Ambulance: East Midlands
- UK Parliament: Rutland and Stamford

South Luffenham is a village in the county of Rutland in the East Midlands of England. The population of the civil parish was 470 in 2021 increasing from 455 at the 2011 census.

The village lies largely on the north side of the A6121 road from Uppingham to Stamford. It is divided into two by a small stream, the Foss, which is a tributary of the River Chater.

The village has two pubs, the Boot Inn (formerly the Boot and Shoe) and the Coach House (previously the Halfway House), as well as the parish church and the village hall. South Luffenham Hall stands a short distance to the south-east of St Mary's church. There is a ruined windmill to the east of the village.

== History ==
The village's name means 'homestead/village of Luffa'.

At Christmas 1793, a tribe of gypsies were camping at the 'Follies' near Foster's Bridge. The gypsy king, named Edward Boswell, had a beautiful daughter, Rose, the Princess. She was just 17 and dying of consumption (tuberculosis). When the time came to move on, she was too ill to travel in a jolting caravan, and so the gypsies stayed a further two months on the cold bleak heath. When she died, the churchwardens of South Luffenham would not have her buried in the parish because she was not considered a Christian. The curate, the Rev. Bateman, finally over-ruled his parishioners and she was buried in the south aisle. A few weeks later, a marble slab arrived from London, and was placed over her remains, subscribed by the many gypsies who converged from afar to express sympathy with their king. The slab is still faintly discernible in the church.

Luffenham railway station was located to the north of the village and also served the neighbouring village of North Luffenham. The railway station opened in 1848 and closed in 1966. In fact, there were two railway stations in the parish, since Morcott station lay just within the South Luffenham parish boundary.

In November 1904, as Edward Berridge of Ketton was delivering bread in South Luffenham, Charles Louth stole a loaf of bread to the value of 2½d, from the cart. He was sentenced to 14 days' hard labour.

The last blacksmith was Mr Pepper from Barrowden who visited twice weekly until 1910. To the south of the smithy, in Back Lane in a shed, was a general grocers store.

Before the Second World War, the Earls of Ancaster owned all the farms and most of the cottages, except Church Farm, which belonged to the Conants. The estate was then split up and sold off. In those early days, the village was self-sufficient, having two butchers and one baker. In addition, Bates' carrier journeyed from Barrowden each Friday to convey goods, but no passengers, to Stamford; cash would also be taken to the banks. Joe Kirby came from Barrowden each Saturday afternoon in a covered wagon selling haberdashery. The post came from Stamford by horse and cart, and subsequently by rail to Luffenham station, and whoever kept the village post office was obliged to take the letters round the village.

There is no recollection of any bombs falling in the parish during the Second World War, or of aircraft crashes. War touched the community in the form of 28 child evacuees, who in 1940 arrived from London at the height of the bombing of that city. Among them was young Terry Parsons, later to become a famous singer, under the name of Matt Monro.

== Out and about ==
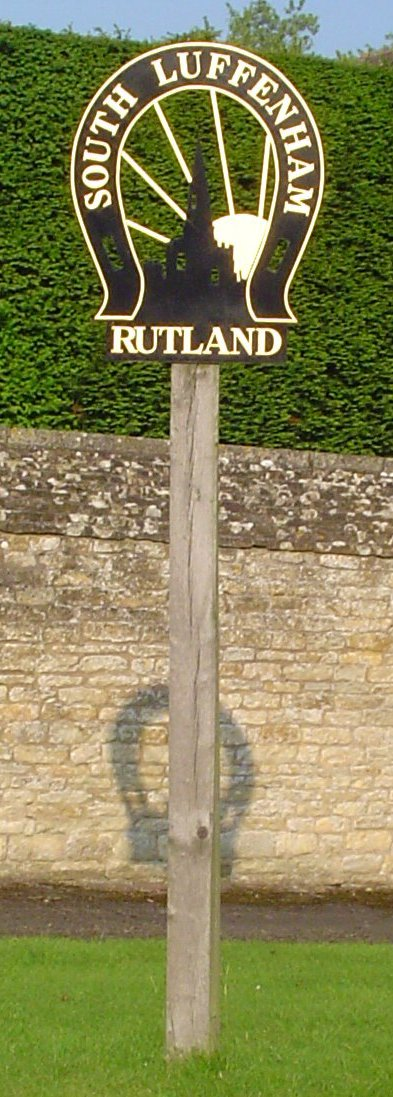
Village signpost

Around the village are a number of old lanes little used now as they were of old. Cannonball Lane leads up to Morcott Spinney, so called because it is handed down that Cromwell's men set up his cannons in this spinney from which to fire on North Luffenham.

Of other road tracks, Clay Lane leads to the fields below the cemetery, and for those following the main road to Morcott, there used to be a footpath along the north side, but some years ago, the Council widened the road and absorbed the path. On the south side of this road stands a brick barn, this being built in Victorian times to serve as a dance hall for the two villages.

The village green was once surrounded with white posts and chains, with a seat in the middle. The fence was put up so that the children could play within without being disturbed by wandering cattle. The posts were removed in the 1930s.

== Quarries ==
In 1919, ironstone pits were opened on the road to Pilton; there were extensive sidings to service the pits, which closed in 1968.

In the 1920s, the Asphaltic Slag & Stone Co. Ltd set up a quarry and erected an office on the Stamford road, opposite the entrance to the recreation ground. Twenty men were employed but not from the village. The quarry business only lasted some four years as the stone was quarried out. Nothing survives as the site has been levelled.

Another quarry opened up at the north-east of the parish and was served by a rail line connecting with the main line near Foster's Bridge. In October 1920, Arthur Waterfield was killed by a fall of earth while engaged at the Luffenham Ironstone Works.

== Tunnels and Tailbys Field ==
Tunnels are said to run from the church to the Foss (the stream), and from the Old Hall site in Tailby's (now Bellamy's) field to the church. One villager recollected in 1912 going down the latter tunnel to rescue a terrier dog. The tunnel was some five feet high, ten feet down and built of rough stone. Having travelled five yards (5 m) in the direction of the Hall he gave up and returned because of the crumbling condition of the tunnel walls.

There are various theories regarding the mounds in Tailby's field. Some recount that it is the site of the Old Hall and surrounding cottages, others think that the main mound covers an old icehouse. It is true that a few years ago a calf fell into a tunnel beneath the mound, and that afterward this was firmly covered over.

At the northern corner of this field is the Adam and Eve Barn, so called because of the inset stone carving. It is thought to have been an earlier tithe barn to that which now adjoins the church. Before the First World War, the building, also known as the old Primrose Barn (after the Primrose League used by them prior to 1900) served as the village hall, and dances were held there; here would be danced the 'Lancers' and 'down the middle', all to the accompaniment of an accordion. Later the old school room, opposite the new school, was used for village meetings, until the new village hall was built in September 1922.

== School ==
The 'Old School', now a private cottage, was built in 1846 with pointed windows, to show its connection with the church. This first school was the National School, and it was not until 1875 that the new school opposite was built by the rector, Rev. James Lonsdale and presented to the village. He built it at his own expense and purchased the old school to house the head teacher. In 1900, there were 130 pupils; in 1969, when the school finally closed, there were 30. In 1972, the building was turned into a private house.

There was also, at the turn of the 20th century, a reading room and men's club in Sapcote Cottages.

== Pinfold ==
A pinfold was formerly sited at the south end of Pinfold Lane. It was constructed with a six-foot high stone wall with iron gates, and was finally knocked down in 1910, although a part of the wall still survives today. One villager recollects a farmer walking his sheep from Ayston to Stamford Market and resting them in the pinfold overnight.

== Water supply ==
The village did not have a public pond and cattle would drink from the ford on Back Lane, crossing for villagers being by footbridge. There was a pond on private land, where the last bungalow on North Luffenham Road is now sited. A bridge replaced the Back Lane ford in the 1940s.

A lead village pump on the north side of The Square was removed in the 1950s. The well underneath was fed from another well at the corner of Cutting Lane and Gatehouse Lane, the Council paying ten shillings a year to the LNW Railway for a pipe to run underneath the railway. The owner of the top well then demanded ten shillings a year. When the Council refused to pay, the supply was cut off. The Council then sank themselves a well in the Hempyards to supply The Square. The Hempyards, also known as the Ropewalk, survive as mounds today, but nothing is known of the actual works, and it is assumed that they closed in the mid 19th century or earlier.

The public water supply for the other half of the village came from the spring, still running today, and sited below the old grocer's shop opposite the Boot Inn.

Cattle were taken to be washed at the wash-dyke set in the Chater, just below the stone bridge on Moor Lane (North Luffenham Road). The wash-dyke was last used in 1925.

== The mills ==
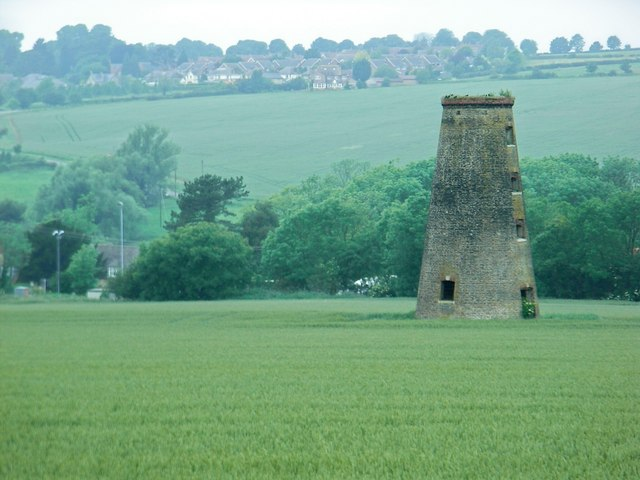
The shell of the tower mill

The windmill was built in 1832; in 1895, a storm blew the cap off, but the building continued to be used until 1908.

The watermill is early 19th century. Owned by Molesworths, a miller was employed, who was responsible for controlling the water level of the sluice and the working of the mill. In addition, his duties covered management of the Railway Hotel. After the closure of the adjoining mill, trade at the hotel decreased and it was forced to close in the 1930s. Prior to 1910, flour had mainly been milled, and 16 stone (100 kg) sacks were hoisted to the second floor for storage and lowered to carts below when required. When the steam-driven mill was installed in 1910, the mill concentrated on offals; this consisted of split beans, split maize, kibbled wheat (lightly rolled for chickens) and barley meal. Gleaners from the fields took their grist at harvest to the mill to make barley meal for their home-fed pig. Wheat was frailed (flailed) at home with two long poles with leather thongs, this having to take place when there was a high wind, in order that the chaff should blow away. Some gleaners frailed with a five-pronged fork.

The watermill was sold in 1927. Mr Asplin, the miller, closed the sluice gate one night, forgot about it, and by morning the house and the mill were flooded. He continued milling offal until 1948, when the flume broke, the river taking a different course, and the mill was forced to close.

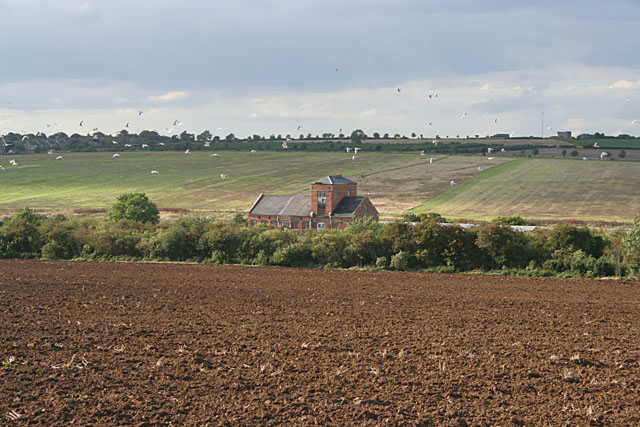
The former mill by the railway

A steam and electric mill was built by Edmund Stapleton in 1890. The mill machinery was railed direct from Thomas Robinson & Son Ltd of Rochdale via a siding from the Midland Railway. The mill opened in 1892, Babcock & Wilcox steam boilers driving the rollers, and grinding grain at the rate of 8 sacks, each of 20 stone (130 kg) stone, per hour. Water for the boilers to make steam was pumped from the watermill. Production increased to 10 sacks per hour, then 20. Twelve men were employed from the village, and six from other villages. Men from Molesworths quarry, when short of work, came to the mill, but spent more time in the Railway Inn. In 1914, men earned 14 shillings a week and by 1919, 27 shillings a week. The furthest delivery point by horse and cart was to Somerby, but in the 1920s Foden steam engines took over, these being replaced by Yorkshire cross-boiler engines with solid tyres. By 1925, a Dennis petrol wagon was hired from Leicester. This had pneumatic tyres and speeds of 30 mph (48 km/h) were reached. Flour was then delivered as far away as Coventry and Spalding. Four tons would be carried on the wagon, and four on a trailer.

In the depression, Cadge & Colman purchased the milling rights, but the mill became uneconomic and the business was transferred to Godmanchester. Luffenham remained a distribution centre until 1927. After remaining empty for some 13 years, Riull & Sons bought the premises and manufactured clips for rifle cartridges.

In 1942, the Ryvita Company installed a plant for drying and washing rye for biscuit manufacture, up to 20 men being employed at the peak season. The railway siding was in use at the time, but when the station closed in 1966, this link was severed and the factory closed. Newall Engineering then took the premises mainly for reconditioning of grinding machines, some 20 men being employed. The site is now Linecross Limited.

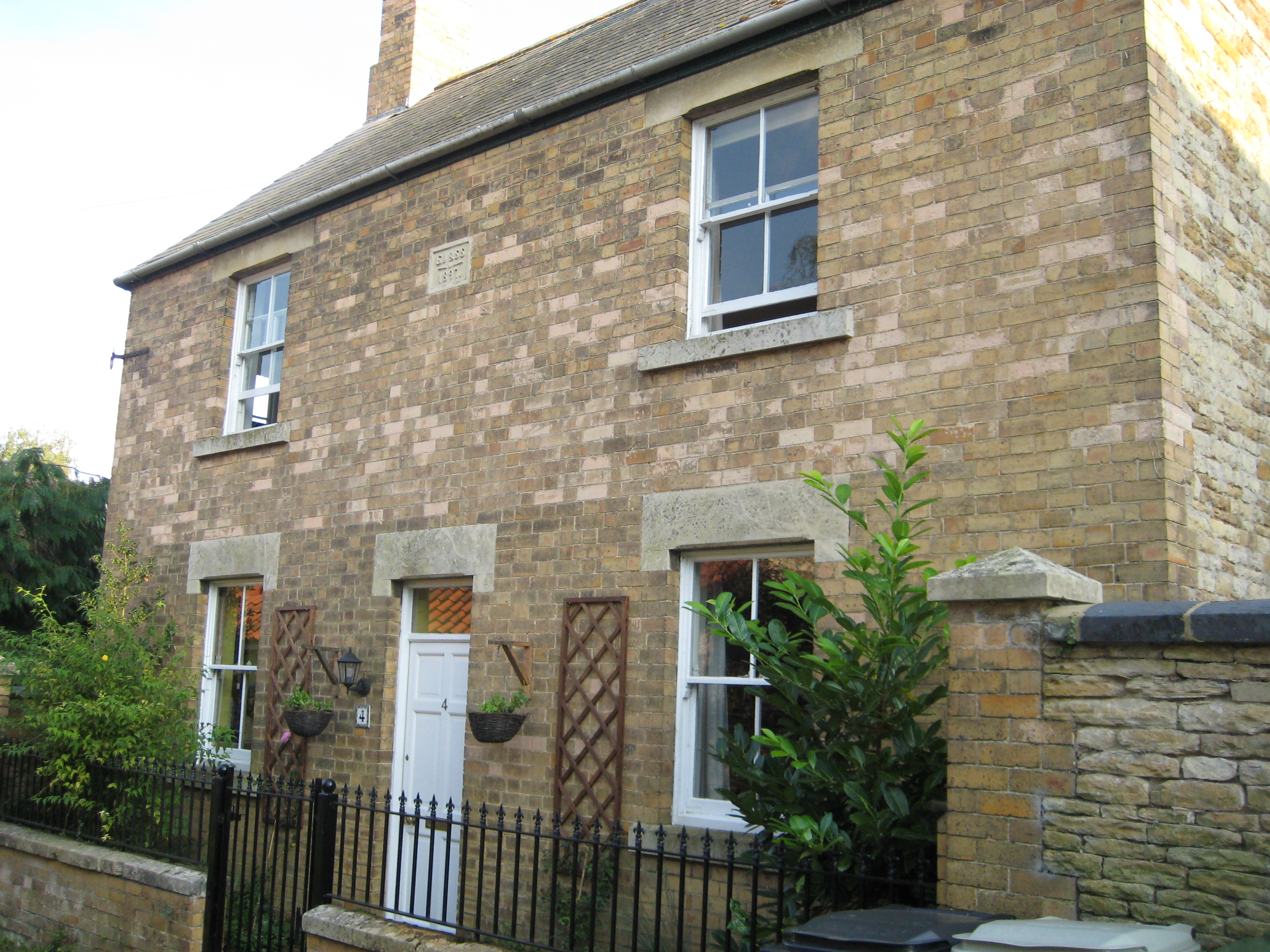
Edmund Stapleton's house in Frisby Lane

Edmund Stapleton, who founded the steam mill, lived in the village and was also a builder and publican (at the 'Durham Ox', now a private house). He purchased two old stone cottages in Frisby Lane, and replaced them in 1897 with a Victorian-style brick-faced house, named 'Swiss Cottage'. The date, and his initials and those of his wife can be seen on a medallion on the front of the house. The house survived the village fire of 1913 (see below) as it had a modern slate roof rather than one made of thatch.

== The common ==
From the 14th century until Enclosure in 1882, owners of land held their strips, called 'known acres', each owner or occupier using the same strips each year as his own, subject to rights of grazing. An area of 10,743 acres (4,348 ha) was divided into 1,238 pieces among 22 owners. When the crops had been gathered, the land became common pasture until wanted for the next cultivation. In South Luffenham, only tenants of the arable land had rights of common over the arable, whereas in Barrowden, owners of certain cottages had grazing rights. The ancient custom had been that a fixed or 'stinted' number of beasts used the fields, but of later years this was disregarded.

Shocky Balke (baulk meaning a strip of grass between cultivated strips) leads southwards from the top of Pinfold Lane on to the common, where there was a pond. From this point, the track became Hangman's Lane up to the gallows, sited there, it is said, to discourage the poor who would collect their wood and feed their geese on the common. The point is marked today by some fir trees.

The common originally stretched from Barrowden Lane to Foster's Bridge. The Earl of Ancaster exchanged his fields, on which the allotments and recreation field now stand, for the 400 acres (1.6 km^{2}) of common on which he built Luffenham Heath golf course which opened in 1911. In January 1921, fire destroyed the workshop, showroom, and caddy's hut at the Golf Club, having been started by a spark from a stove in the workshop.

An elderly woman who was walking up the common from Tixover during a cold and foggy night, was guided back to South Luffenham by the sound of the church bell tolling. In gratitude, and for others who might become lost, she donated a field, whose income should pay the sexton to ring the bells at 5 am and 8 pm daily from the end of October to 25 March. This continued for many years until the outbreak of the First World War. The field was originally at Foster's Bridge, but the endowment was transferred to the Bellringers Field, also known as the Feast Field and Bell Field, opposite The Coach House.

== Notable people ==
- Robert Cawdrey, compiler of one of the first dictionaries of the English language, the Table Alphabeticall, became rector in 1571 but was deprived in 1587 for his puritan sympathies.
- Owen Gwyn, Master of St John's College, Cambridge from 1612 and Vice-Chancellor of the University of Cambridge 1615–16, was instituted Rector 28 October 1611, remaining in office until his death in 1633.
- Robert Scott, (1811–1887) the co-editor with Henry George Liddell of a Greek-English Lexicon, the standard dictionary of Ancient Greek, was rector here for four years before he was elected Master of Balliol College, Oxford in 1854. Balliol held the advowson from 1855 and many of the priests appointed were fellows of the college and noted scholars.
- In 1867, promising 17-year-old poet Digby Mackworth Dolben drowned in the River Welland nearby when bathing with the son of his tutor, Rev. Constantine Estlin Prichard (1818–1869), rector of South Luffenham 1854–69 and formerly a fellow of Balliol College.
- James Stephen Hodson, who was rector 1877-81, is commemorated here along with his brother William Stephen Raikes Hodson (1821–1858), a soldier prominent in the Indian Mutiny - "Hodson of Hodson's Horse".
- Agnes Maude Royden, suffrage campaigner, and woman preacher, worked as parish assistant to its Rector, George William Hudson Shaw, whom she ultimately married in 1944.
- Matt Monro, singer, was evacuated to the village as a child during the Second World War.
- Graham Hoyland (born 1957), author and mountaineer

== Inns ==
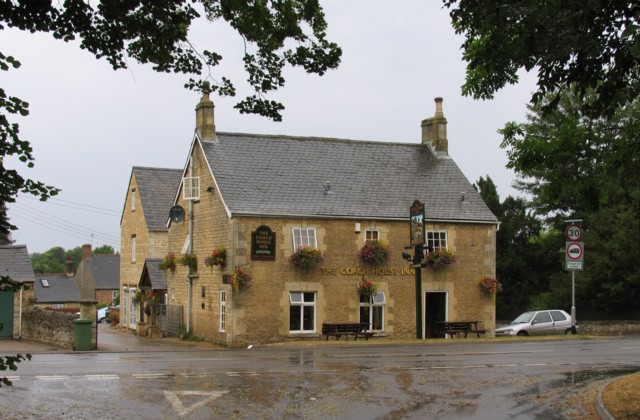
The Coach House, formerly the Halfway House

Various businesses have been conducted at the Boot Inn, a shoemakers business in the mid 19th century, which ceased around 1900, giving 'the Boot and Shoe' its name. A coal business was also carried on from the inn, and the village bakehouse was on the west corner of the building, Mr Chard being the last baker until the 1950s. Villagers brought joints of meat and batter for Yorkshire puddings here on Sundays, and these were cooked in the bake oven for twopence a time up until 1935. The chamber for the flour for bread-making was sited above the ovens to keep it warm and dry, and 10 stone (64 kg) bags of flour from Luffenham Mills were hauled up on a wooden ladder. In 2025 planning permission was granted for conversion to residential use.

The Halfway House inn was so called as it was an ostler house at the midpoint for stages between Stamford and Uppingham. In 1814, the 'Lord Wellington Accommodation Coach' ran from Birmingham via Leicester and through South Luffenham at 10 am daily and connected at Stamford with the 'Lord Welling Coach' for travellers on to Norwich. The 'Leicester Coach' passed through at 3 pm on Mondays, Wednesdays, and Fridays from Stamford. The pub was extended and renamed the Coach House in the 1990s.

The former post office was once two cottages; in the part that was later the shop lived George Hippey, a platelayer. He fell foul of the landlord and one day threw paraffin under the front door, followed by a lighted match.

== Festivals ==
=== May Day ===
Children were trained to dance round the maypole, which was set up in the school playground or on the Green, this celebration ceasing in 1923. The May Queen and her attendants travelled around the village in three or four farm wagons, which were decked up with garlands, all the horses having their martingale brasses highly polished. There was then a free tea for the children in the rectory (or occasionally the Hall) grounds, and the lawns would be lit up with large Chinese lanterns. In the evening there would be dancing in the Adam and Eve barn.

=== Ploughboy Monday ===
The ploughboys would go round from door to door on Plough Monday, the second Monday in January collecting wine and cakes – and money, if possible. The blacking of faces and dressing up by the boys, traditional in other villages, is not recollected in South Luffenham. The custom died out in the 1920s.

=== Wassailing Day ===
Wassailing was held on each 21 December until 1939. At this, the old ladies of the parish would visit the farmers and gentry to collect a shilling or a quart of tea.

=== South Luffenham Feast ===
(1st Sunday after 15 August). The Nassington or Collyweston band would arrive to start the Feast Week by marching around the village, and then playing on the Green. During the week, cricket matches against other villages were held on the recreation ground. Fenwicks from Lincolnshire arrived with their swingboats, worked by pulling ropes, and a roundabout pulled round by a piebald pony called Tommy. These, other stalls, and a rifle range shooting at clay pipes, were set up in Bellringers Field, and they stayed for the whole week. It is remembered that Vincent Second, an Italian, came from Stamford with his gaily-painted float loaded with ice cream. Great bouts of singing and dancing took place in the pubs during the week, and most men got drunk, some paralytic, on homemade wine.

== The railway ==
At one time, thirteen trains a day plied between Stamford through South Luffenham and on to Seaton railway station on a double line, although one track was taken up in 1914. A small engine pushed and pulled its single carriage up and down the line. The train was affectionately known as the Wessy, the Push and the Pull, the Puff and Dart, or the Dartzi. The line from Seaton was closed and lifted in 1966.

== Inspired ==
At the turn of the 20th century Jack Ingram, a well-known steeplejack, visited the village one Saturday, and was asked to grease the weathercock. He brought this down from the church steeple, and promptly refused to put it back unless he was paid a gold sovereign. This was eventually given, but not before a fight had broken out over a disagreement amongst the villages over the 'levy'. Ingram later became a "milestone inspector" (a tramp).

There is a tradition in the village that sea-going boats once came up the Foss to a quay by the old village pond, and were unloaded by monks from a monastery below the church. The stream was thought to be a canal, when the sea came up to Uffington, and was quite deep until the water was backed up and silted in the race to provide power at the watermill. The Chater was said to be six feet deep at the wash-dyke.

== The great fires ==
In July 1874, Samuel Hippey, a six-year-old child, playing with lucifer matches beneath a straw stack of Mr Ball, the baker, started a conflagration that spread to two cowsheds. The high wind at the time scattered burning thatch and straw in all directions and in 20 minutes George Tailby and George Pretty's farms were ablaze, as were four cottages, two occupied by William Faulks and Thomas Skillett, and a pub tenanted by George Watson. These were in Pinfold Lane; the position of the inn is unrecorded, although it is known from the 1846 Directory that the pub was the Axe and Saw with Mr Pridmore the licensee. The fire covered some 3 acres (1.2 ha), and eleven straw stacks caught fire as well.

Although plenty of water was at hand, the fire had too strong a hold and all that could be done was to douse the buildings nearby to prevent a spread. Apart from a pig and a few fowls, there were no casualties, but damage amounted to £1,327.

Fire brigades came from Stamford, Uppingham, and Normanton, arriving too late.

In April 1913, after the passing of the LNWR football special carrying excursionists to Market Harborough to cheer on Stamford (who lost), fire was noticed in Pridmore's farmyard. There was a high wind and it was assumed that a spark had come from the engine. Properties destroyed included Mr Greenfield's butcher shop, five cottages, two farms and three straw stacks; a quantity of livestock, mainly chickens, was also lost.

The Stamford engine pumped water from the brook, and the manuals from Uppingham and Normanton gave assistance. Every thatched building was burnt out, although those with slates were saved from serious damage; the Durham Ox sign was burnt down.

Later the Parish Council considered subscribing for the Stamford Fire Brigade, for they had turned out with their steamer although not obliged to. This was in the days before the local authorities took over the fire service.
