= Morcott Brook =

Stream in Rutland, England

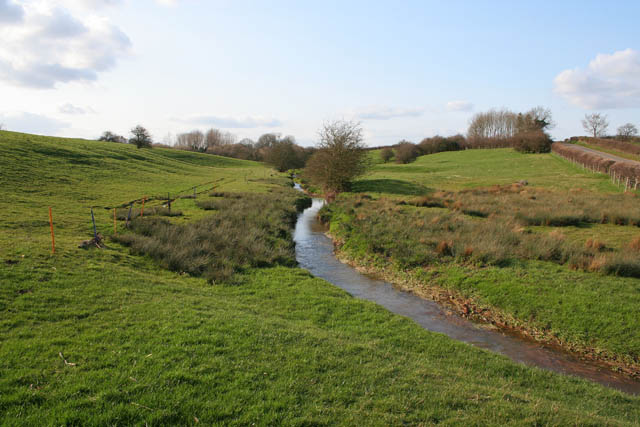
- The Morcott Brook between Glaston and Morcott

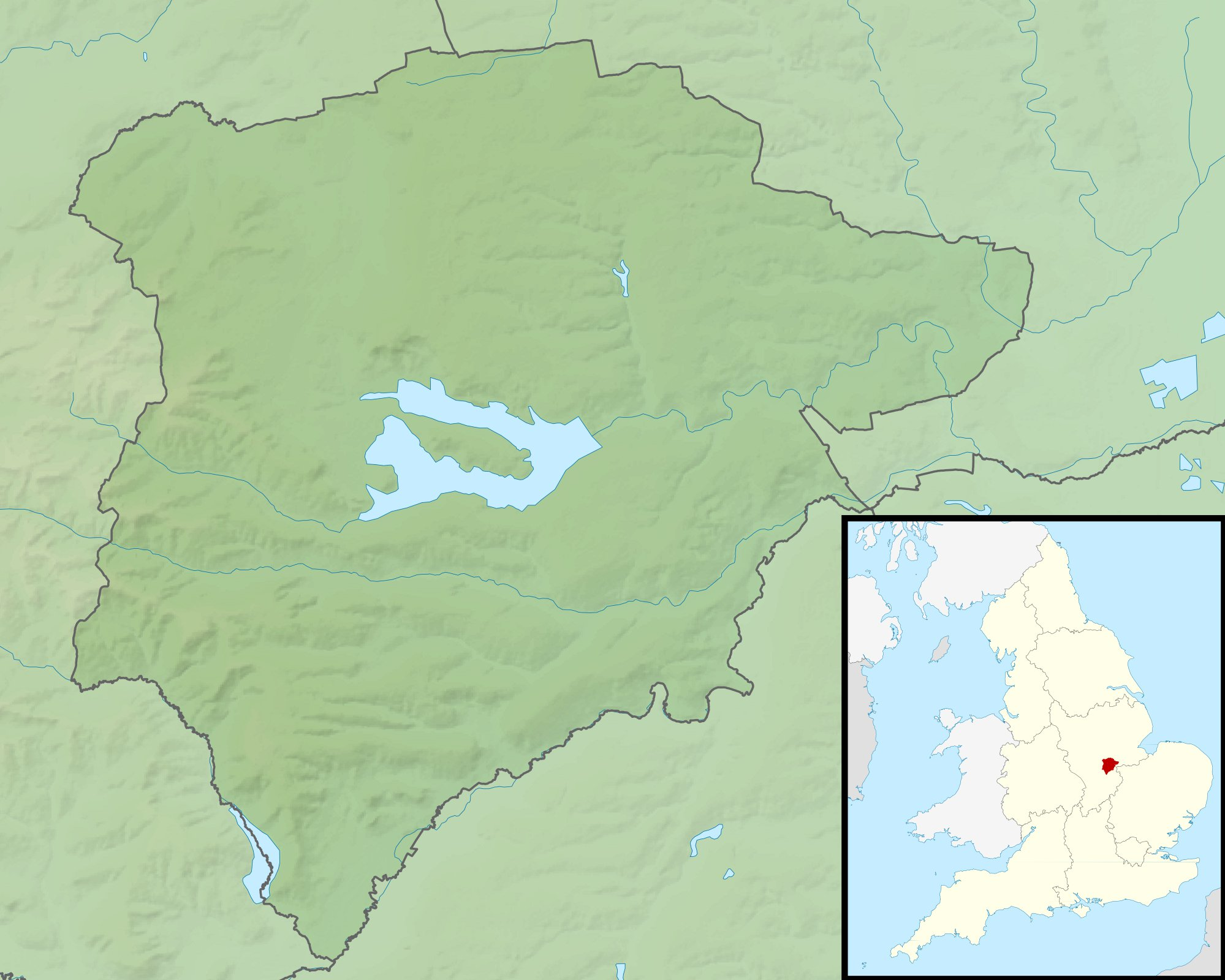
- Location of the river mouth in Rutland

Location
- Country: England
- County: Rutland

Physical characteristics
- Source
  - location: Ridlington, Rutland
  - coordinates: 52.611053°N 0.753478°W
  - elevation: 152 m (499 ft)
- Mouth: River Chater
  - location: South Luffenham, Rutland
  - coordinates: 52.613292°N 0.609722°W
  - elevation: 49 m (161 ft)
- Length: 12.2 km (7.6 mi)
- Basin size: 20.9 km^{2} (8.1 sq mi)

Basin features
- River system: River Welland

The Morcott Brook, also known locally as "The Foss", is a small watercourse in Rutland in the East Midlands of England. It is a tributary of the River Chater and part of the River Welland catchment.

== Course ==
The Morcott Brook rises near Ridlington and flows in an easterly direction through a narrow valley past Ayston and between Glaston and Wing where it picks up a small amount of flow from an unnamed tributary rising near Preston. It continues eastwards, passing to the north of Morcott where it turns sharply towards the north-east and passes through the centre of South Luffenham. Upon leaving the village, it soon passes under the Birmingham to Peterborough Railway Line and joins the River Chater near the former Luffenham railway station.

== Status ==
In 2016, the overall classification of the Morcott Brook was 'Bad' under the Water Framework Directive for reasons of physical modification and artificial barriers and their negative effect on fish, poor nutrient and livestock management in the surrounding agricultural land and continuous discharge of treated sewage effluent.
