= Owen Gwyn =

Welsh priest

Owen Gwyn (died 1633) was a Welsh churchman and academic, Master of St John's College, Cambridge from 1612 and Vice-Chancellor of the University of Cambridge in 1615–1616.

== Life ==
Gwyn was from Denbighshire, the third son of Griffith Wynn, of the Wynn family of Gwydir. He took up in 1584 one of the scholarships at St John's College founded by his uncle, the lawyer John Gwyn, matriculating at Easter. He graduated B.A. in 1588 and M.A. in 1591; and proceeded B.D. in 1599, D.D. in 1613. He became a Fellow in 1589. Among his pupils was his cousin John Williams, who later advanced his career. He was rector of Honington in 1605, was elected Master in 1612, and was Vice-Chancellor in 1615/6 . He was also vicar of East Ham, Essex, from 1605 to 1611, and rector of South Luffenham, Rutland, from 1611. Williams made him Archdeacon of Huntingdon in 1622, and a prebendary of Lincoln Cathedral. He was buried in the college chapel, on 5 June 1633.

== Notes ==
Academic offices
Preceded by Richard Clayton	Master of St John's College, Cambridge; 1612–1633	Succeeded by William Beale
