= St Theodore's Roman Catholic Church, Hampton =

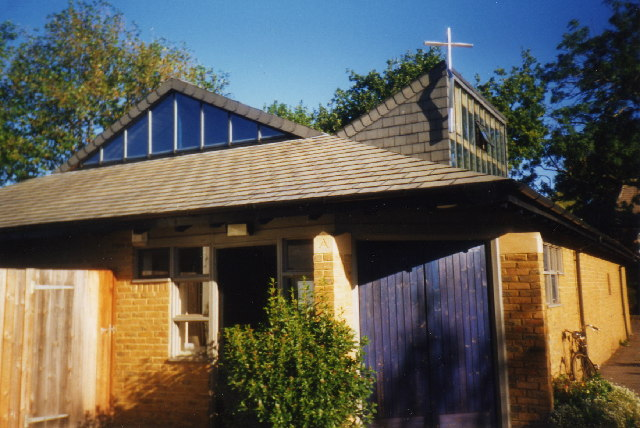
- St Theodore's Roman Catholic Church, Hampton
- 51°24′57″N 0°22′8″W
- Location: 110 Station Rd, Hampton TW12 2AS
- Country: England
- Denomination: Roman Catholic
- Website: www.sainttheodores.org

History
- Founded: 1927

Architecture
- Architect: Austin Winkley

Administration
- Division: Upper Thames Deanery
- Diocese: Roman Catholic Archdiocese of Westminster
- Parish: Hampton-on-Thames

Clergy
- Priest: Rev Dominic Byrne

St Theodore's Roman Catholic Church, Hampton is a Roman Catholic church on Station Road in Hampton in the London Borough of Richmond upon Thames.

== History ==
In 1897 Michael Farmer, who had moved into St. Winifred's in Belgrade Road in 1888, built in Avenue Road a house that included a room which could be used as a Catholic chapel. His son Edmund, who was ordained priest in 1894, was given permission by Cardinal Vaughan to say Mass in the room at St. Winifred's on condition that anyone could attend. In 1918 the workshop was altered to provide more space for the growing number of Catholics in Hampton.

In 1923 the diocese bought Walnut Tree Cottage in Station Road. Father Harold Burton, who was the first priest to live at the cottage, set up a chapel there to say a daily Mass while the Sunday Mass continued in Avenue Road. In 1927 a wood and asbestos building was erected on concrete foundations at the Station Road site. Although regarded as temporary, it remained in use as the parish church for nearly 60 years.

A new church dedicated to Saint Theodore of Canterbury was completed in November 1986. It was officially opened and consecrated on 22 March 1987 by the Archbishop of Westminster, Cardinal Basil Hume.

== Architecture ==
The church was designed by Austin Winkley. The stained glass windows are by Patrick Reyntiens. The wood sculptures are by David John.

== Services ==
Mass is held on Saturday evenings, Sunday mornings and (except during August) on Sunday evenings. Weekday masses are also held on Monday, Thursday and Friday mornings and Wednesday evenings.
