= William Stephen Raikes Hodson =

British soldier (1821–1858)

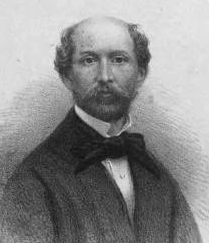
- William Hodson, the frontispiece to his biography Rider on a Grey Horse, by B. J. Cork (1958)
- Born: 19 March 1821; Maisemore Court, near Gloucester, England
- Died: 11 March 1858 (aged 36); Lucknow, Oudh, British India
- Burial place: La Martiniere College
- Military career
- Allegiance: East India Company
- Branch: Bengal Army
- Rank: Brevet Major
- Commands: Corps of Guides; Hodson's Horse
- Conflicts: First Anglo-Sikh War; Indian Mutiny

William Stephen Raikes Hodson (19 March 1821 – 11 March 1858) was an English leader who raised and commanded an irregular light cavalry regiment during the Indian Rebellion of 1857. He was known as "Hodson of Hodson's Horse".

The most celebrated action during his military tenure was to apprehend Bahadur Shah II, the Mughal Emperor of India. The following day, Hodson rode to the enemy camp, heavily outnumbered by the rebels, and demanded the surrender of the Mughal princes who were leading the rebellion around Delhi; he led the captured princes back to the walled city, and, upon finding surrounded by a large group of common citizenry, proceeded to shoot his prisoners before the astounded populace.

Hodson's career received praise from a number of senior military commanders, such as General Hugh Gough, but there were dissenting voices from other members of the military. There were also politicians who felt the killing of the Mughal princes by Hodson had been "dishonourable". However, Hodson's career received praise from more senior politicians including the British prime minister and the secretary of state for India.

Hodson is credited with being jointly responsible for the introduction of the first khaki uniforms in the presidency armies, the military forces of the British East India Company that were eventually reorganised into the British Indian Army before spawning into the modern Indian Army following its independence in 1947.

== Early life ==
William Hodson was born on 19 March 1821 at Maisemore Court, near Gloucester, third son of the Rev. George Hodson, later Archdeacon of Stafford. His older brother was Rev. Dr James Stephen Hodson who served as Rector of Edinburgh Academy.

He was educated at Rugby School under Thomas Arnold and at Trinity College, Cambridge. He accepted a cadetship in the Indian Army at the age of twenty-three, and after joining the 2nd Bengal Grenadiers he saw action in the First Anglo-Sikh War, where he was wounded. He was soon after transferred to the 1st European Bengal Fusiliers. In one of his letters home at this period, he calls the campaign a "tissue of mismanagement, blunders, errors, ignorance and arrogance", and outspoken criticism such as this incurred him the enmity of others throughout his career, who made the most of his character faults.

A contemporary described him as "a tall man with yellow hair, a pale, smooth face, heavy moustache, and large, restless, rather unforgiving eyes… a perfect swordsman, nerves like iron, and a quick, intelligent eye". Hodson delighted in fighting and his favourite weapon was the hog spear. He was a brilliant horseman with the capacity to sleep in the saddle. He was described as "the finest swordsman in the army".

The initial assistance he gave in organising the newly formed Corps of Guides in December 1846 had been one of Sir Henry Lawrence's projects in which Hodson excelled. The Guides Corps had Lt Harry Burnett Lumsden as its commandant and Lt Hodson as adjutant. One of his duties was equipping the new regiment, including choosing the regiment's uniform. With Lumsden's approval, Hodson decided upon a lightweight uniform of Khaki colour, or "drab" as it was then referred to. This would be comfortable to wear and "make them invisible in a land of dust". Accordingly, in May 1848 he liaised with his brother Rev. George H. Hodson, in England, to send "drab" cloth for 900 men as well as 300 carbines. As a result, Hodson and Lumsden had the joint distinction of being the first officers to clothe a regiment in Khaki, which many view as the precursor of modern camouflage uniform.

Later on, he was transferred to the Civil Department as Assistant Commissioner in 1849 and stationed at Amritsar. Thereafter, he travelled in Kashmir and Tibet. In 1852, he was appointed commandant of the Corps of Guides.

On 5 January 1852, he married Susan Annette (died 4 November 1884), daughter of Capt C. Henry, RN, at Calcutta Cathedral; she was the widow of John Mitford of Exbury and he had known her prior to her first marriage. A daughter, Olivia, was born in 1853 but died in July 1854.

While it was unusual at that time for a British soldier in India to be a Cambridge graduate, William further differed from the norm by enjoying classical literature for relaxation. He was a keen linguist and had an interest in learning the main languages of his host country at that time. On his arrival in India he started first learning Hindustani and later Persian, with help and encouragement from his mentor, Sir Henry Lawrence. This apparently was of intellectual and cultural interest to him, particularly as his army quarters offered him little in the way of culture or reading matter, save for the "usual copy of the Bible and works of Shakespeare". He even asked for "a formidable collection of classics" from his brother, although he probably did not see anything unusual in spending three hours a day studying Persian. He even "found it relaxing to read untranslated Xenophon".

== Indian Rebellion of 1857 ==
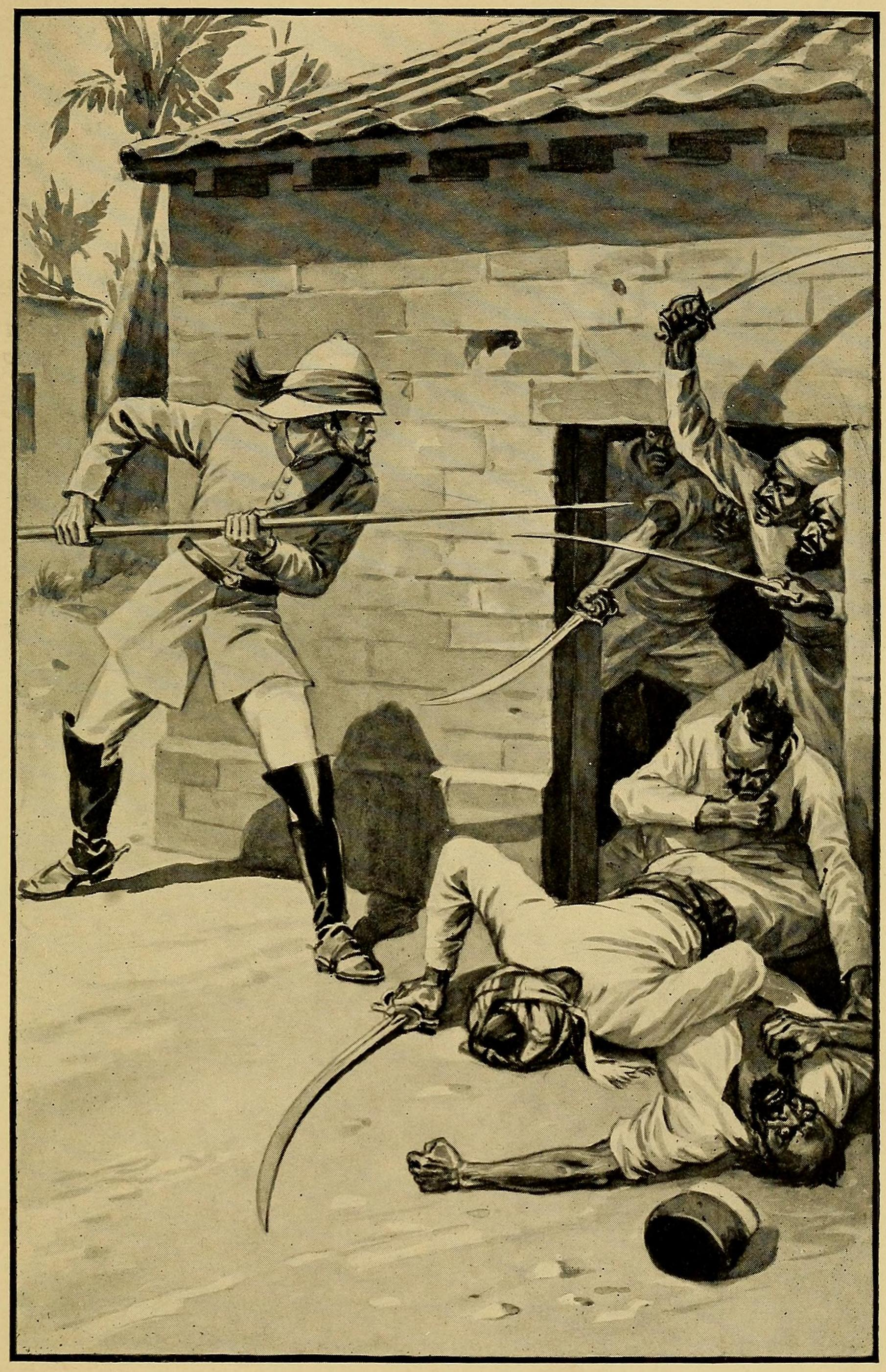
"Hodson and his boar spear" from Heroes of the Indian Mutiny; stories of heroic deeds (1914)

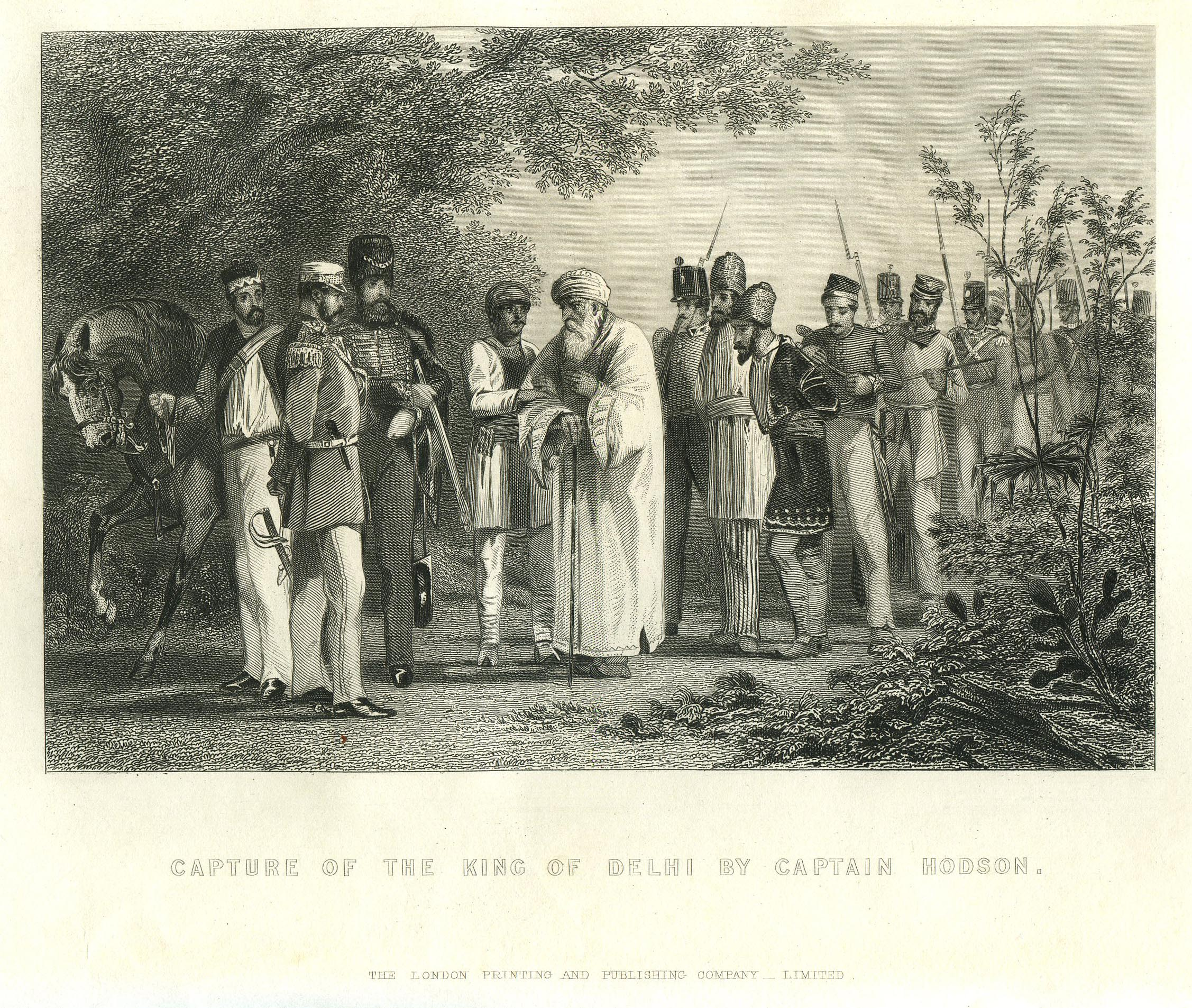
"Capture of the king of Delhi by Captain Hodson" from The Indian Empire (1857) by Robert Montgomery Martin

Following the outbreak of the Indian Rebellion, Hodson was praised for riding with dispatches from General Anson from Karnal to Meerut and back again (a distance of 152 miles in seventy-two hours) through areas designated as hostile. Following this, the commander-in-chief empowered him to raise and command a regiment of 2,000 irregular cavalrymen, which became known as "Hodson's Horse", and placed him at the head of the Intelligence Department.

In his double role of cavalry leader and intelligence officer, Hodson played a large part in orchestrating the reduction of Delhi. His major achievement at this time was the sacking of Delhi and capture of Mughal Emperor Bahadur Shah II, his favourite wife Zeenat Mahal, her young son Jawan Bakht, and a few other members of the Royal Family. He and his men's violent treatment of the Mughal royal family and the brutal, undignified execution of three Mughal princes (Emperor Bahadur's sons Mirza Mughal and Mirza Khizr Sultan, and his grandson Mirza Abu Bakr) incurred notoriety.

The British understood that the old King of Delhi (also referred to as emperor of India) was proving to be a focus for the uprising and the mutineers. The king, his sons, and a few of their men had taken refuge outside Delhi at Humayun's Tomb. The General in command said he could not spare a single European after the walled city ad the Red Fort had been sacked and violently looted. Hodson volunteered to go with 50 of his irregular horsemen to finish what he started. This request was turned down, but after some persuasion Hodson obtained from Colonel (later General) Archdale Wilson permission to ride out to where the enemy was encamped.

Hodson rode six miles through captured territory into the Emperor's camp, containing some 6,000 or more armed revolutionaries, who are said to have laid down their arms when he ordered them to but most likely did so under duress as their families were captured and held hostage in Delhi.

Hodson forced the surrender of Bahadur Shah II, the last of the Mughal emperors of India, promising him that his life would be spared. The capture of the emperor in the face of a threatening crowd dealt the mutineers a heavy blow. As a sign of surrender the emperor handed over his arms, which included two magnificent swords, one with the name "Nadir Shah" and the other with the seal of Jahangir engraved upon it, which Hodson intended to present to Queen Victoria. The talwar and scabbard of Jahangir he received from the emperor were presented by Hodson's widow to the queen and is still in the Royal Collection.

The sons of the king had refused to surrender, demanding guarantees of safety. On the following day, with a few horsemen, Hodson went back and demanded the princes' unconditional surrender contrary to his promises to the Emperor. Again a crowd of thousands of mutineers gathered, angered by the duplicitous character. Hodson ordered them to disarm again, which they did under duress after being reminded of the fact that their families faced death within the walled city. The princes agreed to save their peoples’ lives. He sent the princes on with an escort of ten men, while with the remaining ninety he collected the arms of the crowd.

The princes were mounted on a bullock-cart and driven towards the city of Delhi. As they approached the city gate, a crowd of people again started to gather around them, trying to save their princes. Hodson, seeing these princes as sparks of rebellion and hope for their people, ordered the three princes off the cart and to strip their top garments. He then took a carbine from one of his troopers and shot them dead before stripping them of their signet rings, turquoise arm bands and bejewelled swords. Their bodies were ordered to be displayed in front of a kotwali, or police station, and left there to be seen by all. The gate near where they were killed is still called the Khooni Darwaza, or "Bloody Gate".

The actions were controversial even at the time.

The future Frederick Roberts, 1st Earl Roberts, then a junior officer serving in the Delhi campaign, would later call it a "blot" and criticised "an otherwise brilliant officer" for exposing himself to criticism. Other first hand accounts, such as William W. Ireland, also questioned the exigency of his actions. Hodson's service record showed that he had often behaved in arbitrary fashion before, and he had previously been removed from civil duties by the then Governor General of India, Lord Dalhousie.

Bahadur Shah II was put on trial. However, as Hodson had previously guaranteed his life, he was exiled to Rangoon, Burma, where he died in November 1862 at the age of 87.

== Accusations of corruption ==
In 1855, two separate main charges were brought against Hodson. The first was that he had arbitrarily imprisoned a Yusufzai Pathan chief named Kader Khan, as well as his young son, on suspicion of being involved in the murder of Colonel Mackeson. The man was acquitted, and Lord Dalhousie removed Hodson from his civil functions and remanded him to his regiment because of his lack of judgment and gross negligence.

The second charge was an accusation of misappropriation of the funds of his regiment. He was tried by a court of inquiry, who found that his conduct to natives had been unjustifiable and oppressive, that he had used abusive language to his native officers and personal violence to his men, and that his system of accounts was calculated to screen peculation and fraud. However, a subsequent inquiry was carried out by Major Reynell Taylor: "Taylor's investigation took two months, during which time he went through every item received or paid out by Hodson over the two years of his command". By the end of his investigation into the record of Hodson's accounts Taylor found "...it to be an honest and correct record from beginning to end. It has been irregularly kept, but every transaction, from the least to the greatest, has been noted in it, and is traceable to the individuals concerned".

During a tour through Kashmir with Sir Henry Lawrence he kept the purse and Sir Henry could never obtain an account from him; subsequently, Sir Henry's younger brother Sir George Lawrence accused him of embezzling the funds of the Lawrence Asylum at Kasauli; while Sir Neville Bowles Chamberlain in a published letter says of the third brother, John Lawrence, 1st Baron Lawrence, "I am bound to say that Lord Lawrence had no opinion of Hodson's integrity in money matters. He has often discussed Hodson's character in talking to me, and it was to him a regret that a man possessing so many fine gifts should have been wanting in a moral quality which made him untrustworthy." Finally, on one occasion Hodson spent £500 of the pay due to Lieutenant Godby, and under threat of exposure was obliged to borrow the money from a local banker named Bisharat Ali through one of his officers.

== Financial matters ==
Throughout his career Hodson was dogged by accusations of financial impropriety. He was investigated on more than one occasion but nothing was ever proved. His detractors claim he was a looter; his supporters say that these accusations came from those who disliked his manner and his military success. William's brother, the Rev. G. Hodson, stated in his book that he obtained the inventory of William's possessions made by the Committee of Adjustment and it contained no articles of loot, and Sir Charles Gough, president of the committee, confirmed this evidence. This statement is incompatible with Sir Henry Daly's. Sir Henry Norman stated that to his personal knowledge Hodson remitted several thousand pounds to Calcutta which could only have been obtained by looting. On the other hand, again, Hodson died a poor man; his effects, which included a ring, watch, Bible and Prayer book, and a miniature, were sold for only £170. General remarked "there was nothing in his boxes but what an officer might legitimately and honourably have in his possession." His widow did not have money enough to pay for her passage home and she had to apply to the Compassionate Fund for assistance, which was granted. She was offered the use of an apartment by Queen Victoria at Hampton Court Palace, and left only £442 at her death.

== Death ==
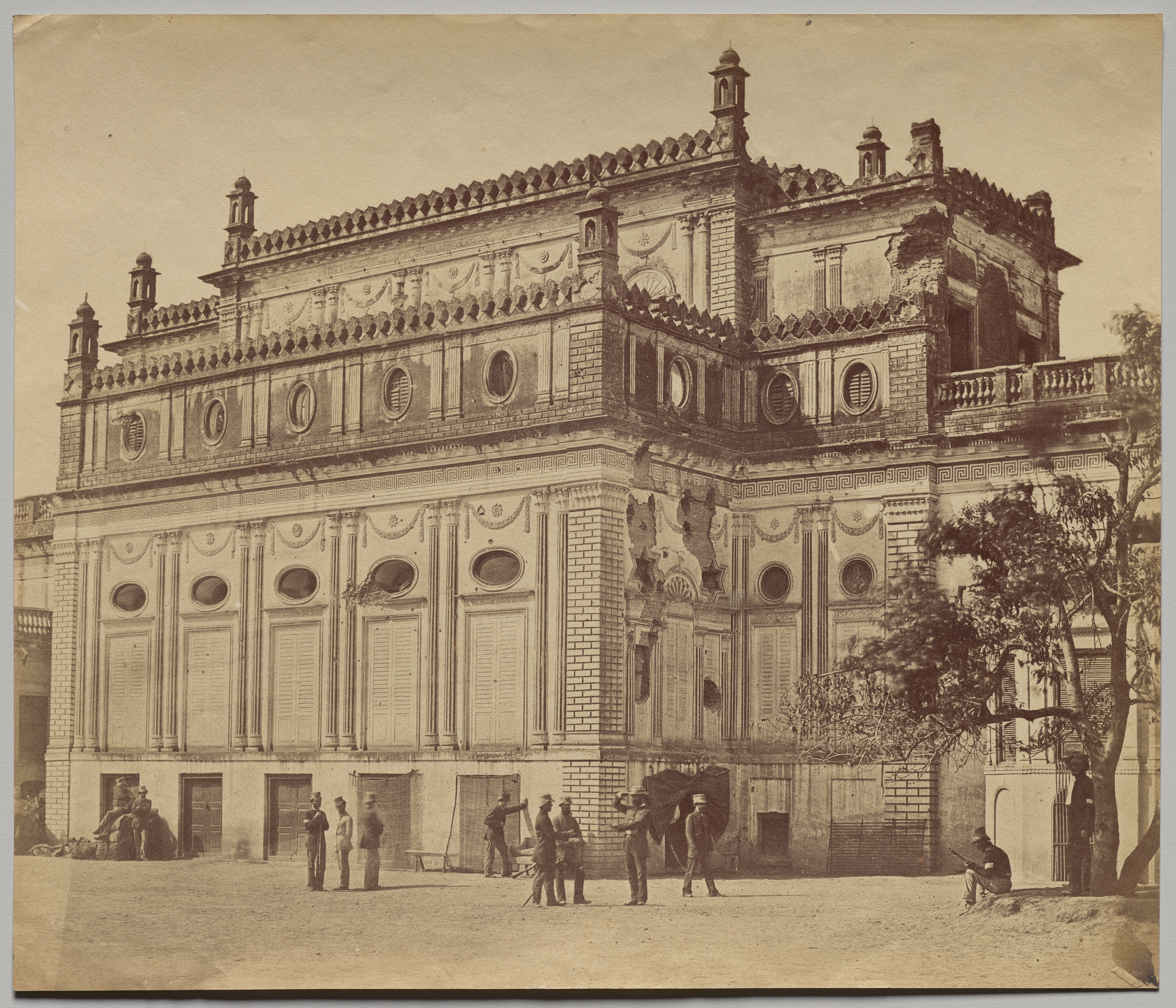
The Begum Kothi where Hodson was fatally wounded.

On 11 March 1858, Hodson's regiment was in Lucknow and while storming the Begum's palace (Begum Kothi) he was shot. His last words were "I hope I have done my duty".

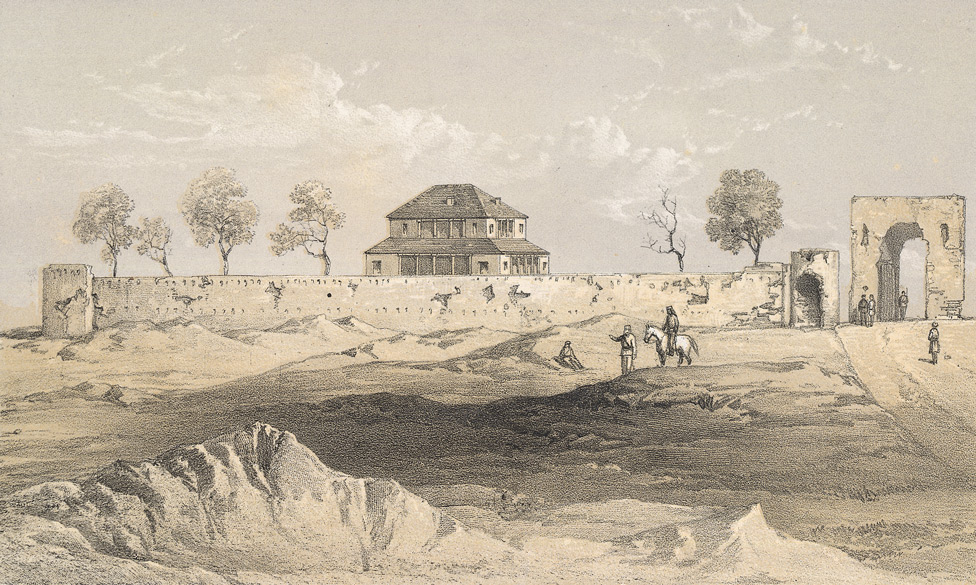
Banks' House in Lucknow, in 1857. Hodson was carried there to die.

On the evening of 12 March 1858, his body was buried in the garden of La Martiniere Lucknow. His grave is still located within the grounds of La Martiniere College. The memorial bears the inscription "Here lies all that could die of William Stephen Raikes Hodson".

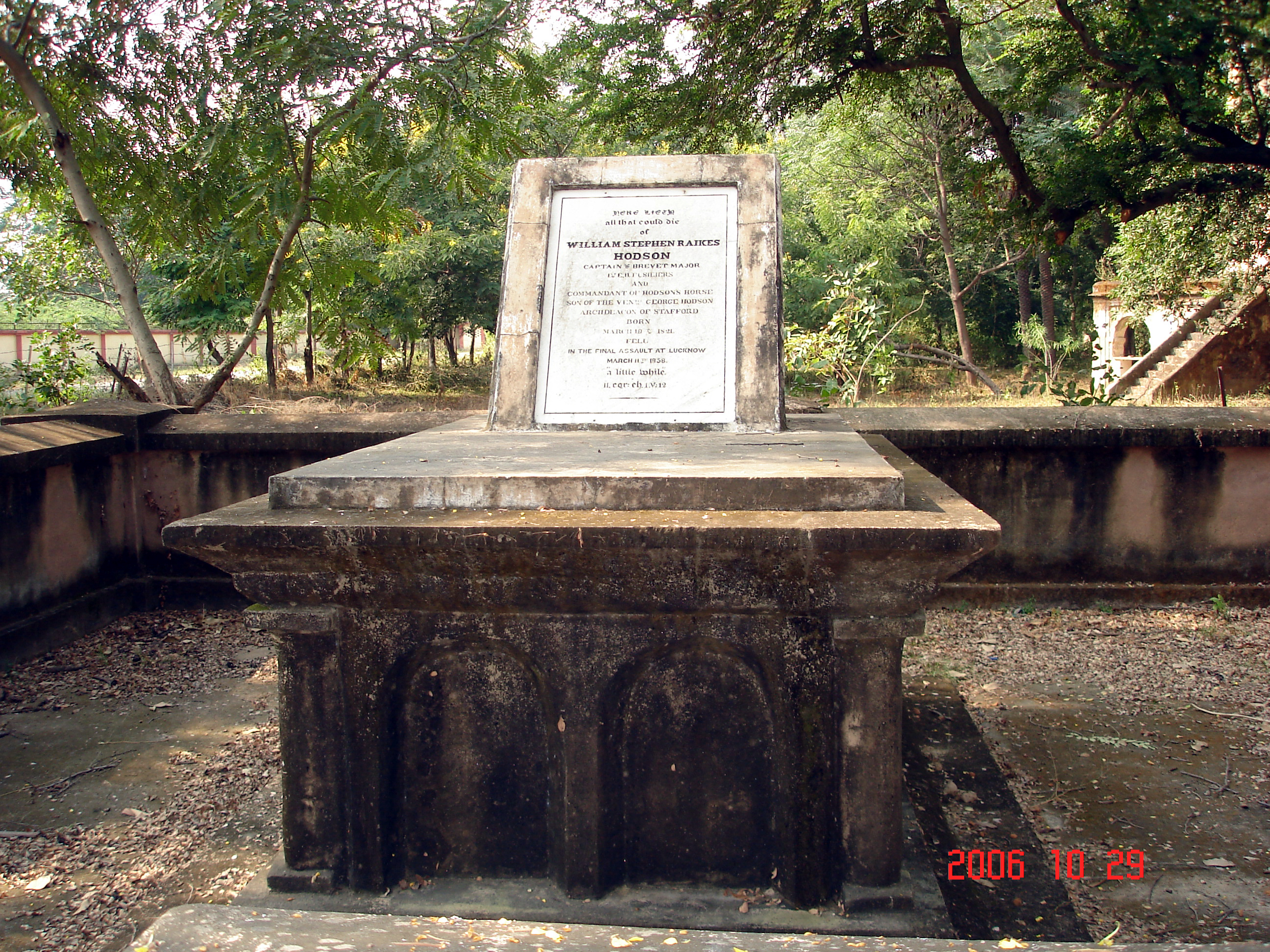
Hodson's grave in La Martiniere College in Lucknow

== Legacy ==
In parliamentary speeches made on 14 April 1859 the Prime Minister Earl of Derby, and the Secretary of State for India Lord Stanley, paid tribute to Hodson. Lord Stanley is quoted as saying:

"Major Hodson, of the Guides, who, in his short but brilliant military career, displayed every quality which a cavalry officer should possess. Nothing is more remarkable in glancing over the biography of Major Hodson that has just appeared than the variety of services in which he was engaged, unless it be the energy and versatility with which he turned from one to the other. At one time displaying his personal courage and skill as a swordsman in conflict with the Sikh fanatics; then transferred to the Civil Service, the duties of which he performed as though he had passed his whole life at the desk; afterwards recruiting and commanding the corps of Guides, and, lastly, taking part in the operations before Delhi, volunteering for every enterprise in which life could be hazarded or glory could be won; he crowded into the brief space of twelve eventful years the services and adventures of a long life. He died before the reward which he had earned could be received, but he attained that reward which doubtless he most coveted—the consciousness of duty nobly done, and the assurance of enduring military renown."

The prime minister said of him

"Doubtless many have fallen who, if they had been spared, might have risen to greatest eminence and have held the highest stations in public service. I allude to Hodson a model of chiefs of irregular forces. By his valour, his rigid discipline, and careful attention to his men's real wants, comforts, desires, and even prejudices, he had obtained an influence which was all but marvellous. This enabled him to lead his troops so formed and disciplined into any danger and into any conflict as if they had been British soldiers. He has met a soldier's death. It will be long before the people lose the memory of Hodson".

General Hugh Gough said of him,

"A finer or more gallant soldier never breathed. He had the true instincts of a leader of men; as a cavalry soldier he was perfection; a strong seat, a perfect swordsman, quick and intelligent".

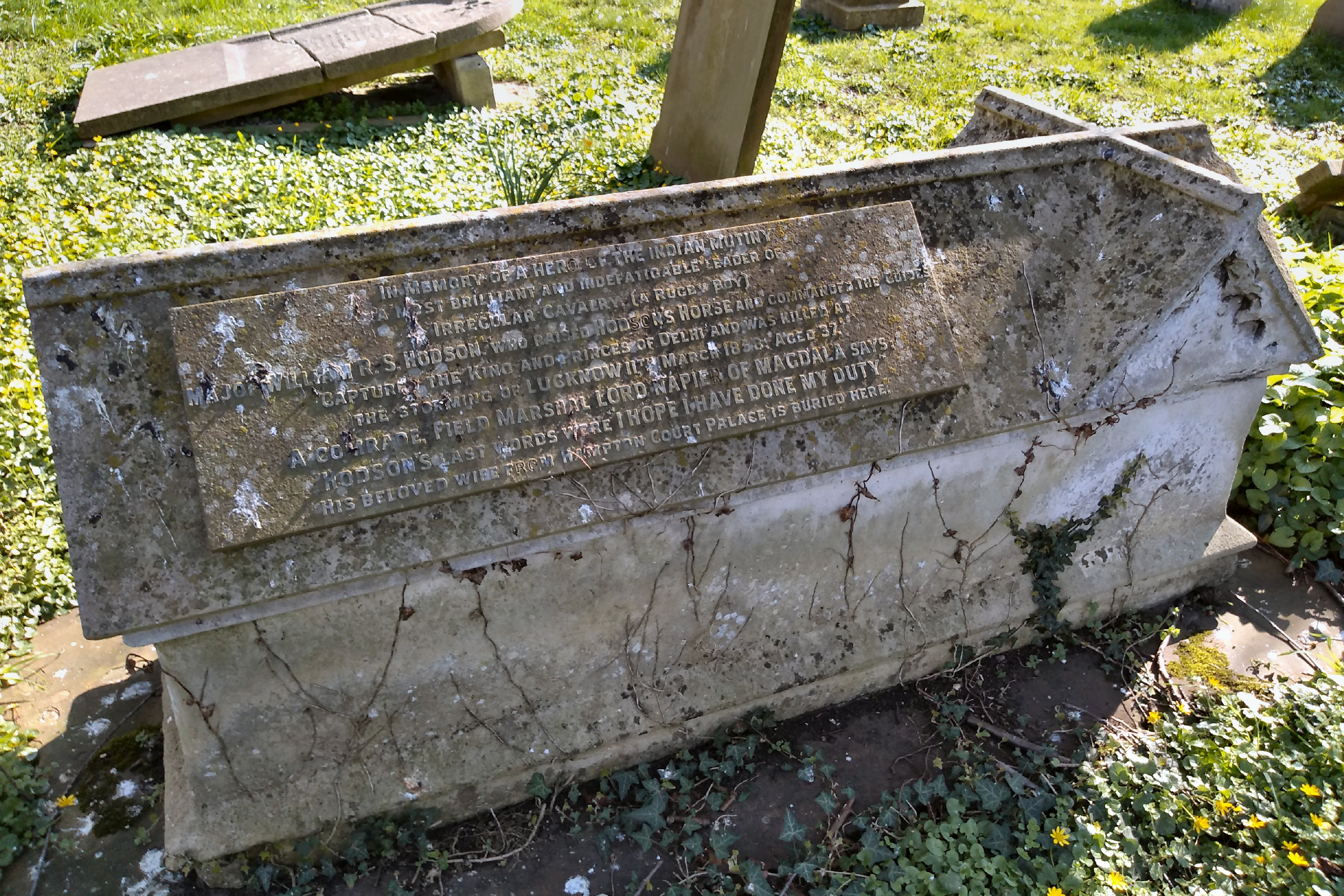
Memorial in Hampton Cemetery, London

This recognition of Hodson by the prime minister was reflected in the special pension granted his widow by the secretary of state for India in Council, who declared it was "testimony of the high sense entertained of the gallant and distinguished services of the late Brevet-Major W.S.R. Hodson". In 1860 Queen Victoria honoured him by granting his widow a grace-and-favour apartment at Hampton Court Palace "in consideration of the distinguished service of your late husband in India".

A large monument to Major Hodson was erected in Lichfield Cathedral, near his father's memorial. It was carved by Thomas Earp to the designs of George Edmund Street.

He features as one of the main characters in James Leasor's novel about the Mutiny, Follow the Drum (1972), which describes his part in these events and his death in some detail.

== See also ==
- Chhibramau for Hodson's Adventure
