= Ketton and Collyweston railway station =

Former railway station in Rutland, England

Coordinates: 52.6254°N 0.5473°W

Ketton & Collyweston
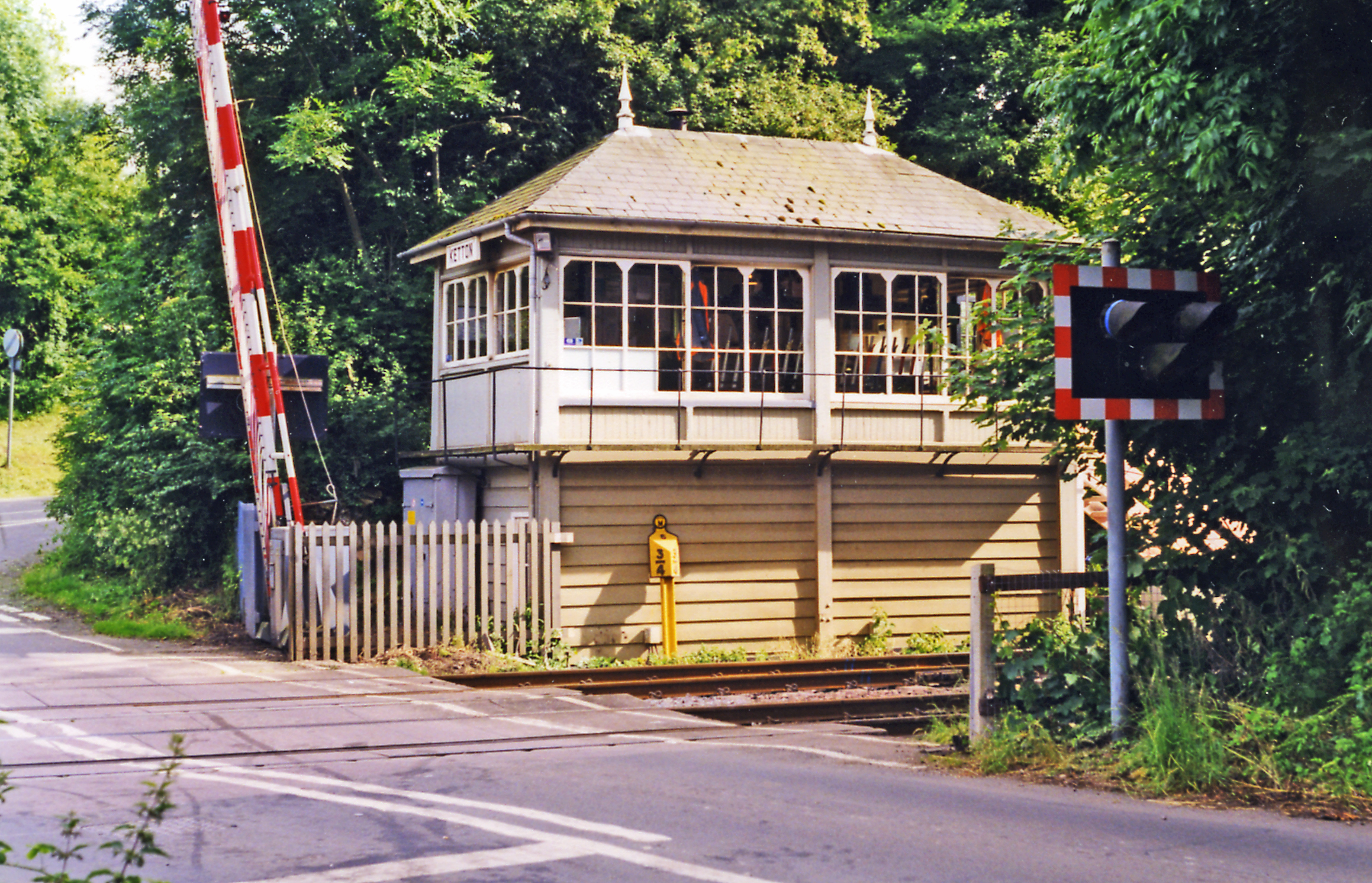
- Signal box at the former station in 1998

General information
- Location: Ketton, Rutland; England
- Grid reference: SK984041
- Platforms: 2

Other information
- Status: Disused

History
- Pre-grouping: Midland Railway
- Post-grouping: London, Midland and Scottish Railway; Eastern Region of British Railways

Key dates
- 1 May 1848: Opened as Ketton
- 8 July 1935: renamed Ketton and Collyweston
- 6 June 1966: Closed
Location

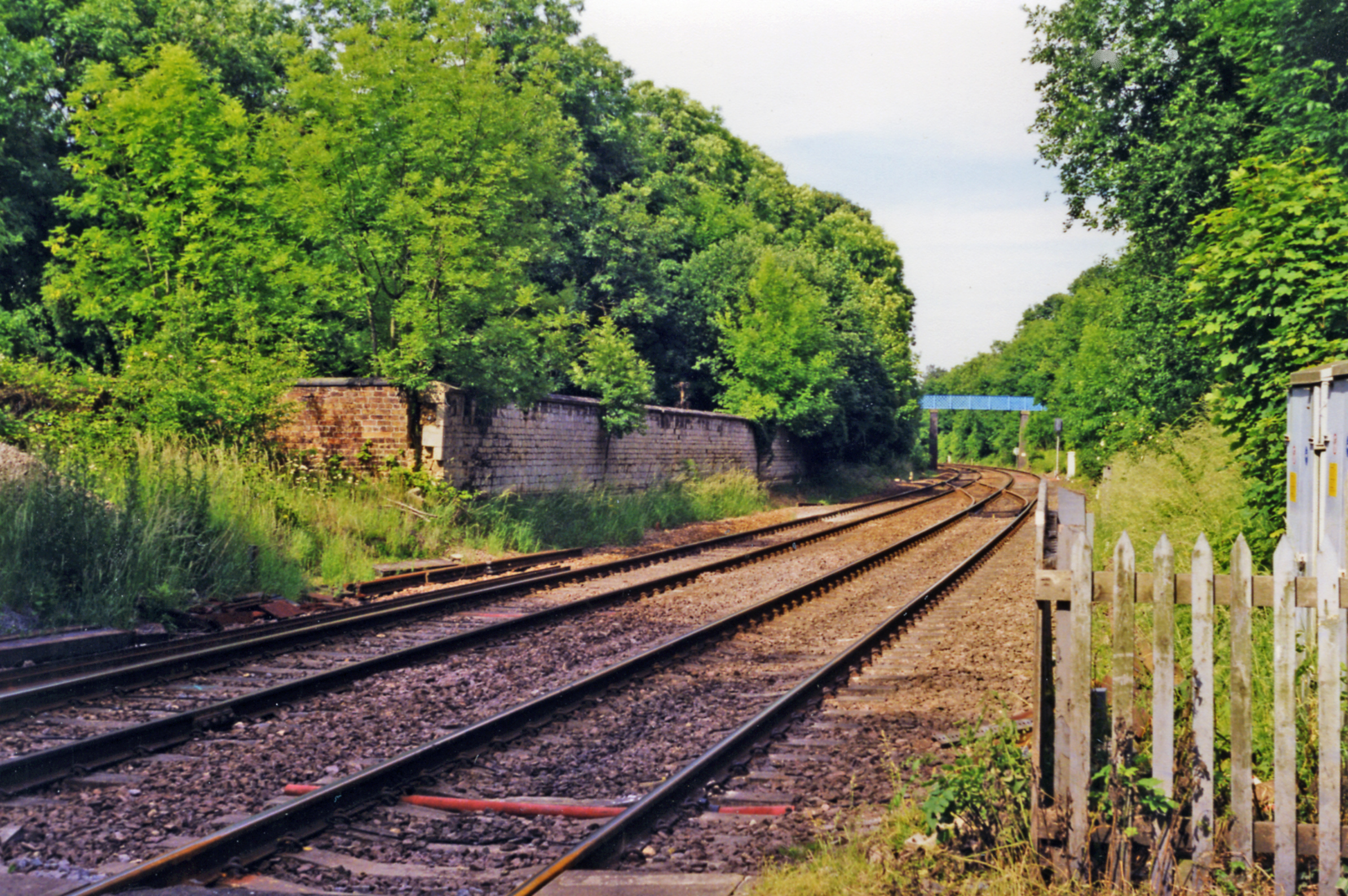
Remains of the station in 1998

The location of Ketton Station, which served the villages around Ketton from 1848 to 1966.

Ketton and Collyweston railway station is a former station serving the villages of Ketton, Geeston, Aldgate and Collyweston, Rutland. It is located in Geeston adjacent to a level crossing on the Ketton to Collyweston road. It is under half a mile from Ketton but over a mile from Collyweston. It closed in 1966.

== History ==
The contract for the erection of the station was obtained by Groocock and Yates of Leicester in 1847. The station was opened by the Midland Railway as Ketton on 1 May 1848, on the Syston and Peterborough Railway about two years after the rest of the line opened. From 1851, trains using the LNWR Rugby and Stamford Railway railway which joined at Luffenham passed through the station but generally did not stop.

Although much of the line had opened in 1846, there was a dispute with Lord Harborough over the course of the line and this section was not opened until 1848. It was built next to a level crossing on the road between Ketton and Collyweston. The handsome station building was built in a Victorian ecclesiastical Tudor pattern of local stone and Collyweston tiles. For good measure it included a small belfry though whether this was ever used is not known. These handsome buildings were demolished in the course of the year 1973. On the other platform was a smaller building in a combination of stone and timber, built in 1872.

To gain a more direct route, in 1879 the LNWR built a line from Seaton to Yarwell junction near Wansford on its Northampton to Peterborough line, thus bypassing the section through Luffenham, though it continued to run a few trains.

On both sides of the double track were ample sidings, particularly on the down Peterborough side where three lines served a good shed and loading dock with a crane. Unusually, access to the three minor sidings was by means of a wagon turntable rather than points. There was a signal box on the other side of the road.

In the early part of the 20th century the station saw six or seven Midland Railway trains per day and five LNWR trains between Seaton and Stamford. After the war this reduced to five a day on the Midland routes with a few on the branch from Seaton.

At grouping in 1923 it became part of the London Midland and Scottish Railway. It received its final name in 1935.

The line from Seaton was closed and lifted in 1966, but the main Midland line is still in operation for trains from Leicester to Peterborough. The station buildings no longer exist.

== Stationmasters ==
- James Osborne ca. 1851
- Henry Prime until 1861 (afterwards station master at Manton)
- John Taylor 1861 - 1863
- O.G. Mills 1863 - 1866 (afterwards station master at Poona, Great Indian Peninsular Railway)
- Joseph Vizall Bendall 1866 - 1870 (formerly station master at Shustoke, afterwards station master at Harpenden)
- Francis Tomblin until 1873 (afterwards station master at Harlington)
- William S. Potter 1873 - 1877 (formerly station master at Wisbech St Mary)
- R. Jeanes 1877 - 1879
- G. Sears 1879 - 1881
- Gabriel Evans 1881 - 1895 (afterwards station master at Castle Donington)
- John Davies 1895 - 1901 (formerly station master at Walsall Wood, afterwards station master at Saxby)
- William Dean 1901 - 1903 (afterwards station master at Barrow-on-Soar and Quorn)
- H.F. West 1903 - 1907 (formerly station master at Barrow-on-Soar and Quorn)
- Frederick Herbert Stanley 1907 - 1934
- J.S. Smith from 1934
- A. Fletcher 1942 - 1950 (afterwards station master at Woodville)
- Sidney William Crowe. ca. 1957 ca. 1964

Preceding station	Disused railways	Following station
Luffenham; Line open, station closed	Midland Railway; Leicester to Peterborough line	Stamford; Line and station open
Luffenham; Line open, station closed	London and North Western Railway; Seaton branch	Stamford; Line and station open
