= Morcott railway station =

Former railway station in Rutland, England

Coordinates: 52.5973°N 0.6308°W

Morcott
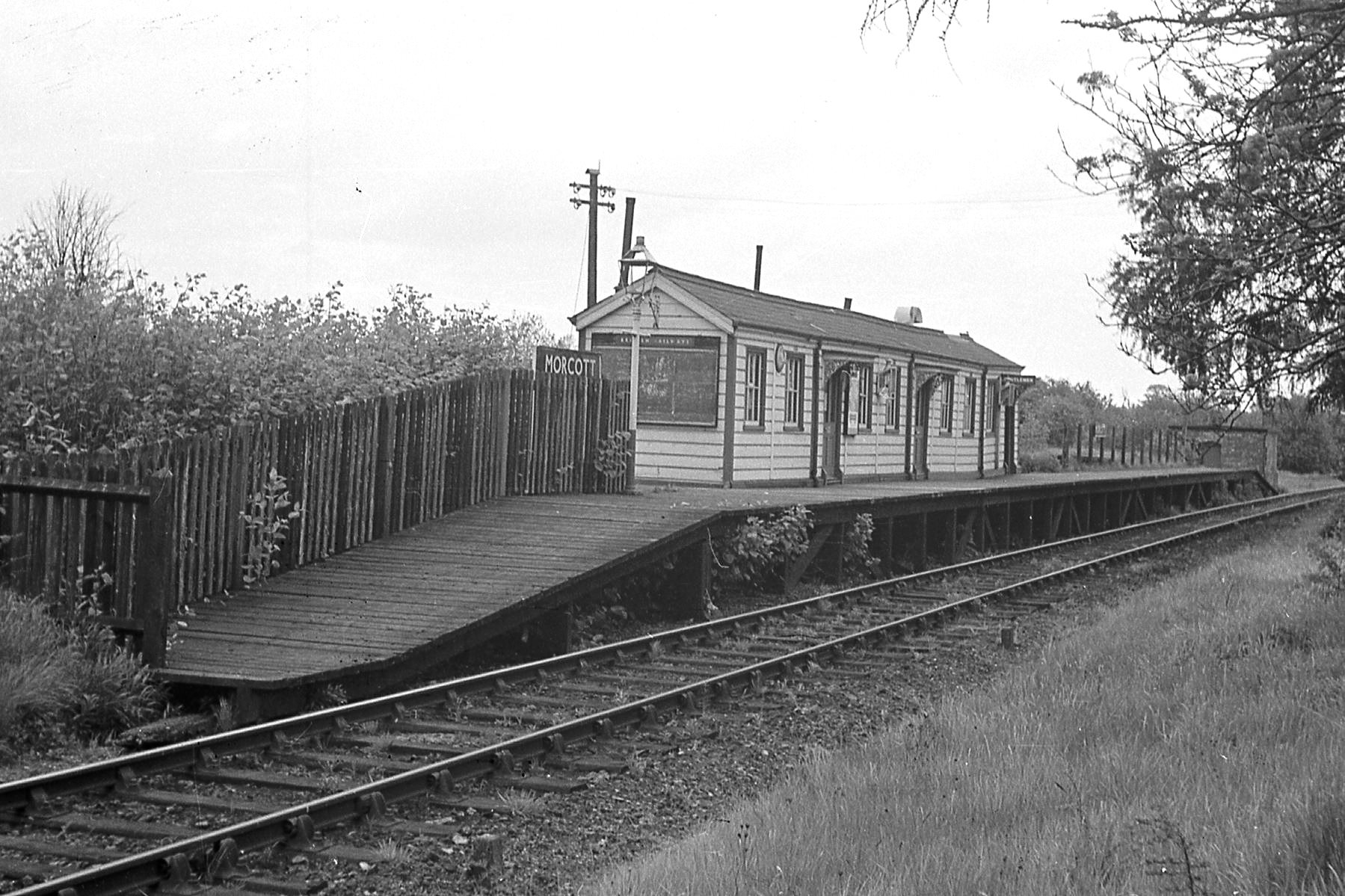
- The station in 1966

General information
- Location: South Luffenham, Rutland; England
- Grid reference: SK928008
- Platforms: 2 (1 from 1907)

Other information
- Status: Disused

History
- Pre-grouping: London and North Western Railway
- Post-grouping: London Midland and Scottish Railway

Key dates
- 1 December 1898: Opened
- 1966: Closed
Location

Morcott railway station is a former station in Rutland, near the village of Morcott.

The location of Morcott Station, which served the village of Morcott from 1898 to 1966

Parliamentary approval was gained in 1846 by the directors of the London and Birmingham Railway for a branch from Rugby to the Syston and Peterborough Railway near Stamford. In the same year the company became part of the London and North Western Railway.

The line opened in 1851 but Morcott was not opened until 1898. To gain a more direct route the LNWR had built a line from Seaton Junction to Yarwell junction near Wansford on its Northampton to Peterborough line, in 1879, thus bypassing the section to Luffenham railway station. Although it was now of little importance, it remained double and Morcott Station was built as a double line station with two platforms. The station buildings and platforms were of timber construction and there was a footbridge.

A siding was provided with loading docks for both horses and carriages. Oddly this could only be accessed from the Luffenham line and it was initially controlled by ground frame. Some time later a crossover from the other line was added along with a signal box. The train service was around five passenger trains per day, with very few freight trains.

In 1907, the section was singled when the second platform, waiting-room, footbridge and signal box were all removed. Entrance lines to the siding are provided for each direction from the single line, with facing point locks.

At grouping in 1923 it became part of the London Midland and Scottish Railway.

Freight services finished on 4 May 1964 and passenger on 6 June 1966.

Preceding station	Disused railways	Following station
Seaton; Line and station closed	London and North Western Railway; Rugby and Stamford Railway	Luffenham; Line and station closed
