= Luffenham =

Luffenham may refer to the following places in England:

- North Luffenham
- South Luffenham
- Luffenham railway station
