= Rockingham railway station (Leicestershire) =

Former railway station in Leicestershire, England

Coordinates: 52.5295°N 0.7249°W

Rockingham

General information
- Location: Great Easton, Leicestershire; England
- Grid reference: SP866932
- Platforms: 2

Other information
- Status: Disused

History
- Pre-grouping: London and North Western Railway
- Post-grouping: London Midland and Scottish Railway

Key dates
- 1 Jun 1850: Opened
- 6 Jun 1966: Closed
Location

Rockingham railway station was a railway station in Leicestershire, England just south of Caldecott, Rutland. Despite being in Leicestershire and closest to Caldecott, it was named after the village of Rockingham, Northamptonshire, which although 1 mile (1.6 km) distant and smaller than Caldecott, was named because of the proximity location to Rockingham Castle.

The station opened in 1850, as part of the single track Rugby and Stamford Railway line of the London and North Western Railway (although it joined the Midland Railway at Luffenham). In 1873 the line was doubled and became part of a new Rugby to Peterborough East route.

The Great Northern Railway also provided trains between 1880 and 1916.

At grouping in 1923 it became part of the London Midland and Scottish Railway.

Following the closure of the station, the station building itself has now become a private residence, to the south of the village of Caldecott. The stations coal shed is still standing. The Castle Inn, public house in the vicinity, has photographs of the station showing it during usage.

| Preceding station | Disused railways | Following station |
|---|---|---|
| Ashley & Weston; Line and station closed | London and North Western Railway; Rugby and Stamford Railway | Seaton; Line and station closed |
| Medbourne; Line and station closed | Great Northern Railway; Leicester Belgrave Road to Peterborough North | Seaton; Line and station closed |
