= Glendon and Rushton railway station =

Former railway station in Northamptonshire, England

Glendon and Rushton
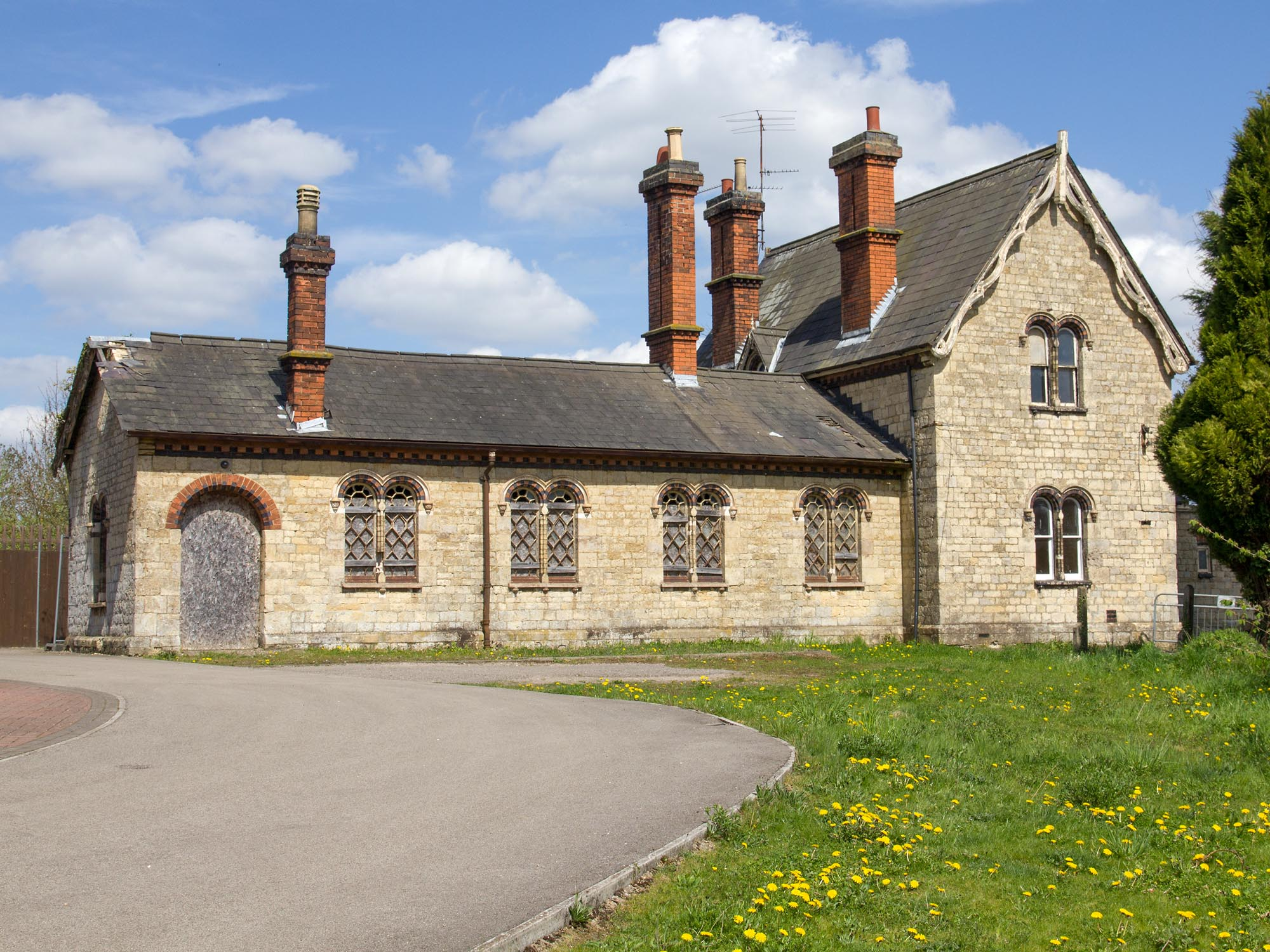
- The former railway station at Glendon and Rushton

General information
- Location: Rushton, North Northamptonshire; England
- Coordinates: 52.43916°N 0.76016°W
- Grid reference: SP843830
- Platforms: 2

Other information
- Status: Disused

History
- Pre-grouping: Midland Railway
- Post-grouping: London, Midland and Scottish Railway; London Midland Region of British Railways

Key dates
- 8 May 1857: opened as Rushton
- 1 March 1896: renamed Glendon and Rushton
- 4 January 1960: Station closed

Listed Building – Grade II
- Feature: Former Railway Station and attached Station-Master's House
- Designated: 5 May 1981
- Reference no.: 1286628
Location

Glendon and Rushton railway station is a Grade II listed former railway station in Rushton, Northamptonshire.

== History ==
Originally known as Rushton it was opened in 1857 by the Midland Railway on what is now the Midland Main Line.

Plans had been made earlier in 1847 for a line from Leicester to Bedford, but had lapsed. However the Midland, running to Rugby at that time and dependent on the LNWR for its path into London, was looking for an alternative. It revived its plans for Bedford to go forward to Hitchin to join the Great Northern Railway.

While initially solving the problem, traffic continued to build such that the line was quadrupled from London as far as Glendon Junction a little way to the south of the station. Here a new line had been opened through Corby and Manton which could be used by goods trains and those for Nottingham., Thus the line through Glendon northwards was double track as far as Leicester.

It was renamed in 1896, possibly when Rushden opened in 1894 on the Wellingborough to Higham Ferrers line.

At grouping in 1923 it became part of the London Midland and Scottish Railway. It closed on 4 January 1960.

Until 2006, the station building was subject to a statutory tenancy, and the daughter of the last Station Master lived there. In 2009 a group was formed, named the "Friends of Glendon and Rushton station", to restore the station which was granted Grade II listed status in 1981, giving it legal protection from unauthorised modification or demolition.

The station was subsequently converted for residential use and is now a private dwelling, known as "Station House". It was badly damaged by a fire late on 28 March 2025, in which three people died.

== Stationmasters ==
- George A. King ca. 1859 - ca. 1866
- Henry Parr Jeffries ca. 1869
- George Benner ca. 1870 - 1883
- George Latimer 1883 - 1919 (formerly station master at Barrow)
- C. Marchant 1920 - ca. 1924
- Charles Leslie Smith ca. 1948
- John Arthur Beswick from 1958 (formerly station master at Shenstone)

Preceding station	Disused railways	Following station
Desborough	Midland Railway; Midland Main Line	Kettering
