= Melbourne railway station =

Melbourne railway station may refer to:

== Australia ==
- Flinders Street railway station, the main station of Melbourne's suburban railway network
- Melbourne Central railway station, a station on Melbourne's suburban network
- North Melbourne railway station, a railway station in West Melbourne, Victoria
- Southern Cross railway station, terminus of Victoria's regional railway network

== United Kingdom ==
- Melbourne railway station (United Kingdom)

== See also ==
- List of railway stations in Melbourne
- Medbourne railway station, a station in Medbourne, Leicestershire, England
