= Welham Junction =

Railway junction in Northamptonshire, England

Coordinates: 52.51970°N 0.87052°W

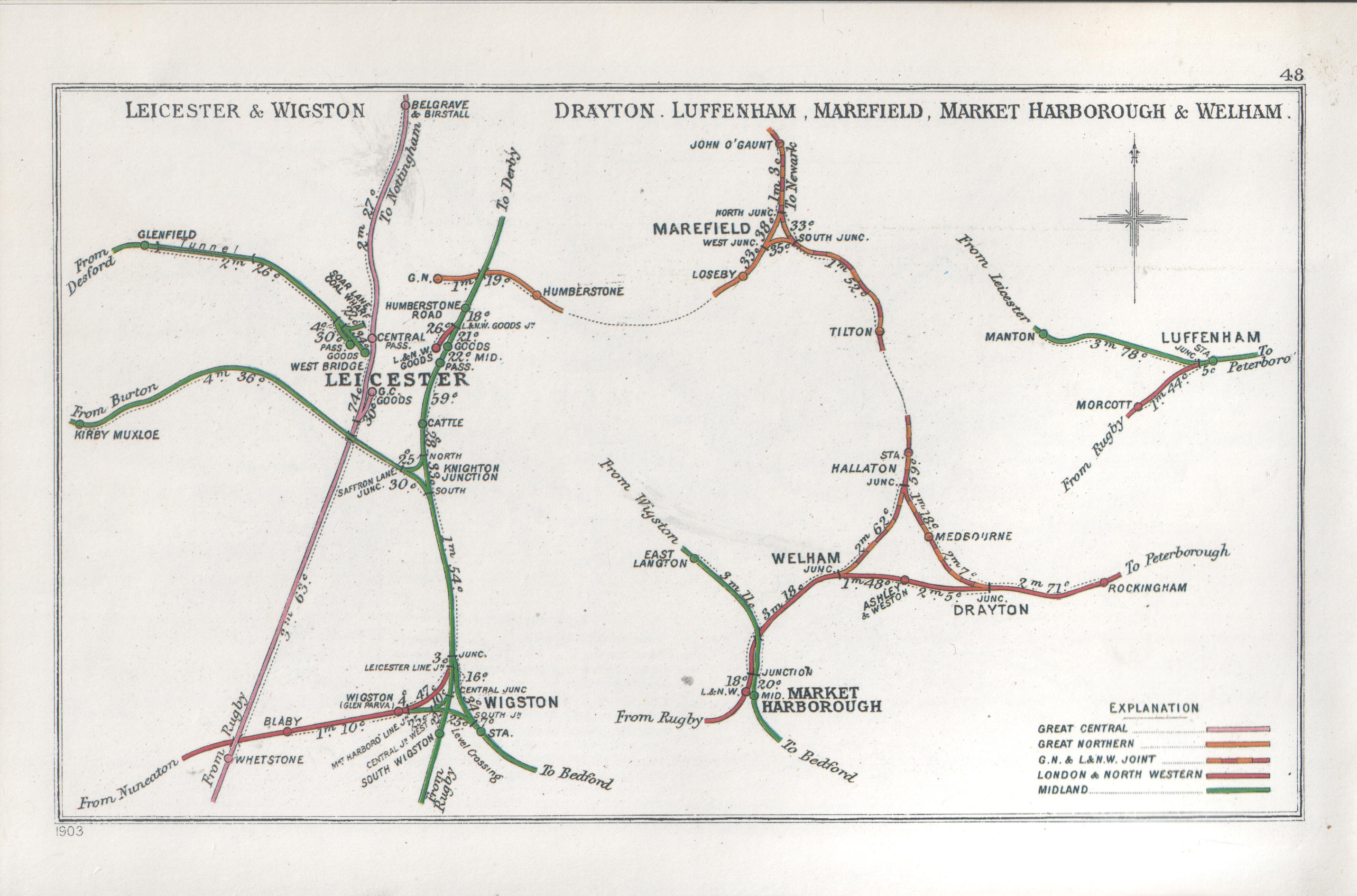
A 1903 Railway Clearing House Junction Diagram showing (lower right) railways around Welham Junction

Welham Junction was a railway junction named after the village of Welham, Leicestershire, although the junction itself lay within the parish of Weston by Welland, Northamptonshire. It was the junction where the line from Market Harborough split, with one route heading eastwards towards Stamford and one north towards Nottingham. Just to the east was Ashley and Weston railway station, and to the north was Hallaton railway station.
