= Hallaton railway station =

Former railway station in Leicestershire, England

Coordinates: 52.5605°N 0.8305°W

Hallaton
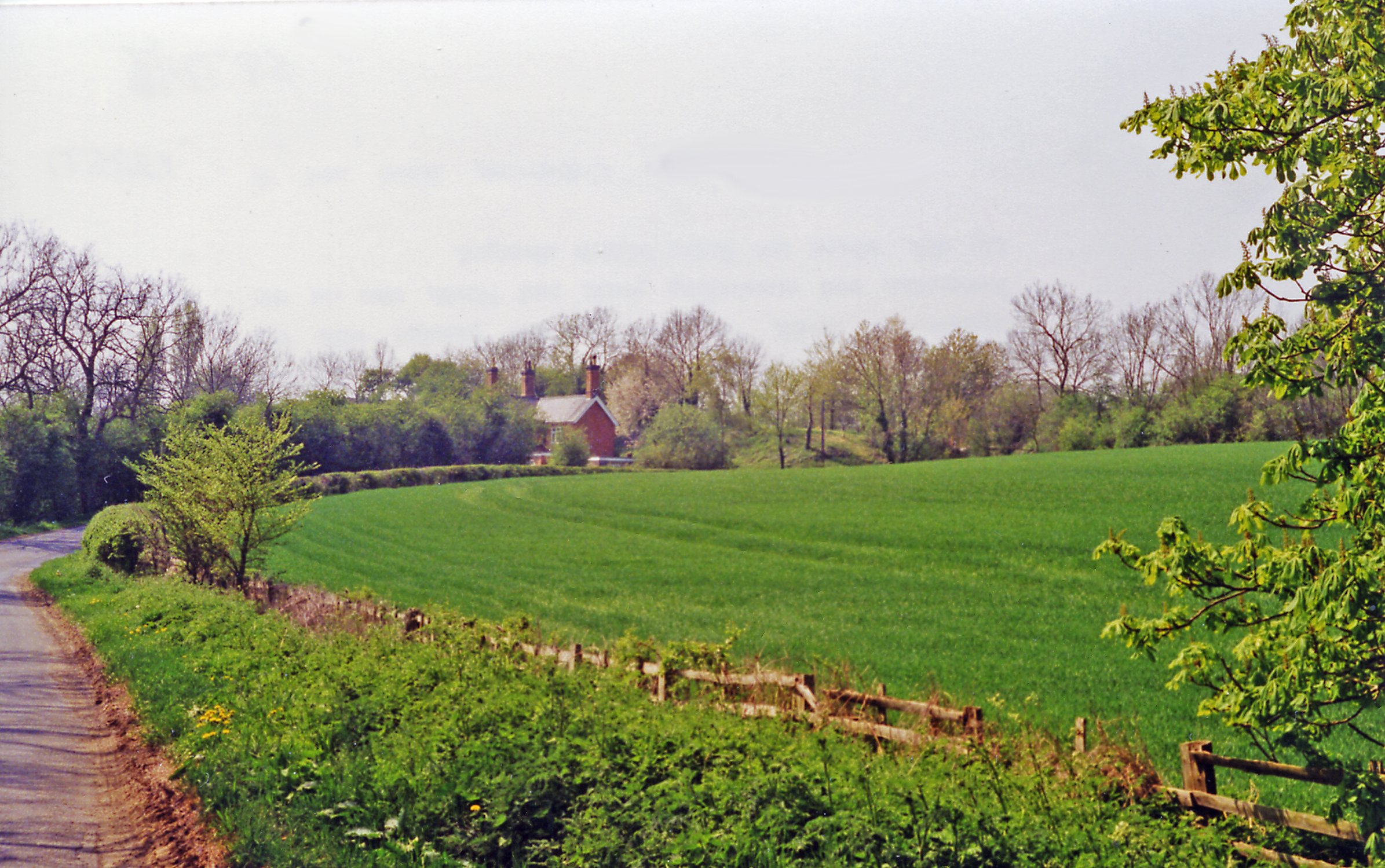

General information
- Location: Hallaton, Leicestershire; England
- Grid reference: SP794966
- Platforms: 2

Other information
- Status: Disused

History
- Pre-grouping: Great Northern and London and North Western Joint Railway
- Post-grouping: LNER and LMS joint

Key dates
- 15 December 1879: Opened
- 7 December 1953: Closed
Location

Hallaton railway station was a former railway station serving the village of Hallaton, Leicestershire, on the Great Northern and London and North Western Joint Railway. The station was located about a quarter of a mile east of the village on the road to Horninghold. The station opened in 1879 and closed to regular traffic in 1953. The Leicester to Peterborough service was withdrawn in 1916. To the south-west was Welham Junction.

Former Services

Preceding station	Disused railways	Following station
East Norton	London and North Western Railway; Nottingham to Northampton	Market Harborough
East Norton	Great Northern Railway; Leicester Belgrave Road to Peterborough North	Medbourne
