= Medbourne =

Village and civil parish in Leicestershire, England

Coordinates: 52.52901°N 0.82217°W

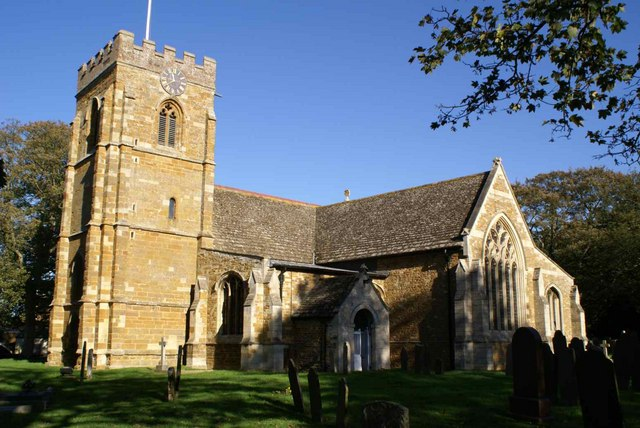
St Giles Church, Medbourne

Medbourne is a village and civil parish in the Harborough district of Leicestershire, England. The population of the civil parish at the 2011 census was 473. Medbourne is located 7 miles north east of Market Harborough and 7 miles south west of Uppingham.

== History ==
It is believed that Medbourne, which lay on the Via Devana (present-day Gartree Road), was a large market settlement at the time of Roman Britain. A Roman villa was excavated in 1721. In the 1086 Domesday Book, it is recorded as the property of lord Robert of Belvoir.

The name "Medbourne" means "Meadow Stream". The Medbourne Brook runs through the village: prior to being channelled in 1844, it acted as a moat around the parish church and village green and regularly flooded the area. There is a high water marker on the Hallaton Road bridge. The main road bridge on Ashley Road (B664) is a listed building: designed by Joseph Vinrace, it dates from 1820.

St Giles Parish church is a Grade II* listed building. It dates in part back to the 13th century. It was extended in 1876, when the chancel was added by Edwin Dolby, and further restored in 1880-81.

The village has several fine ironstone buildings dating from the 17th and 18th century. These include the Old Hall and former Rectory on Rectory Lane; the old Manor House and Dale Farm on Manor Road; and the Manor Farmhouse on Hallaton Road. The manor was previously held by the Chaworth and Payne families. The Nevill and Cunard families lived at nearby Nevill Holt: the Nevills gave their name to the Medbourne village pub.

The Congregational Mission Hall on the Uppingham Road dates from 1870. It is now a private residence.

== Amenities ==
The village has its own shop, known as Medbourne Village Stores and a pub called the Nevill Arms, which dates from 1863. The old village school building (built 1868) now serves as the village hall.

== Transport ==
The railway station closed in 1916. The village is served by the Fox Connect bus service with connections to Market Harborough, Uppingham or Kibworth.

== Leisure activities ==
Each year Medbourne competes with nearby Hallaton during the Bottle-kicking event on Easter Monday. The Sports & Social Club is on the Hallaton Road on the edge of the village and is home to the local football and cricket teams. Despite being in Leicestershire, Medbourne F.C. play in the premier division of the Northamptonshire Combination, which sits at the seventh level of the English non-league pyramid.
