= East Norton railway station =

Former railway station in Leicestershire, England

Coordinates: 52.5948°N 0.8306°W

East Norton
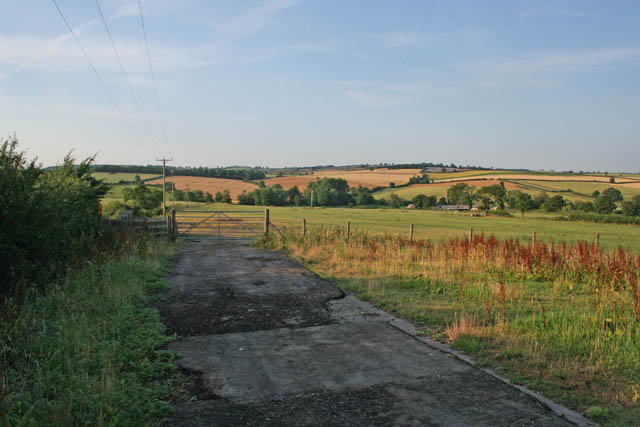
- The site of the station in 2006

General information
- Location: East Norton, Leicestershire; England
- Grid reference: SK793004
- Platforms: 2

Other information
- Status: Disused

History
- Pre-grouping: Great Northern and London and North Western Joint Railway
- Post-grouping: LNER and LMS joint

Key dates
- 15 December 1879: Opened
- 7 December 1953: Closed
Location

East Norton railway station served the village of East Norton, Leicestershire, England. The station was located approximately half a mile east of the village, on the north side of the road between Uppingham and Leicester, now part of the A47. It was situated on the Great Northern and London and North Western Joint Railway.

The station opened on 15 December 1879 and closed to passengers on 7 December 1953.

The station buildings have since been demolished, and the site has been landscaped, leaving no visible trace of the former railway infrastructure.

Former services

Preceding station	Disused railways	Following station
Tilton	London and North Western Railway; Nottingham to Northampton	Hallaton
Tilton	Great Northern Railway; Leicester Belgrave Road to Peterborough North	Hallaton
