= Manton railway station =

Former railway station in Rutland, England

Coordinates: 52.6265°N 0.6956°W

Manton

General information
- Location: Manton, Rutland; England
- Grid reference: SK883040
- Platforms: 4

Other information
- Status: Disused

History
- Pre-grouping: Midland Railway
- Post-grouping: London, Midland and Scottish Railway; London Midland Region of British Railways

Key dates
- 20 March 1848: Opened as Manton for Uppingham
- 1 December 1879: Kettering branch opened to passengers.
- 1 October 1934: Renamed Manton
- 6 June 1966: Closed.
Location

The location of Manton Station, which served the town of Uppingham and the villages around Manton from 1848 to 1967.

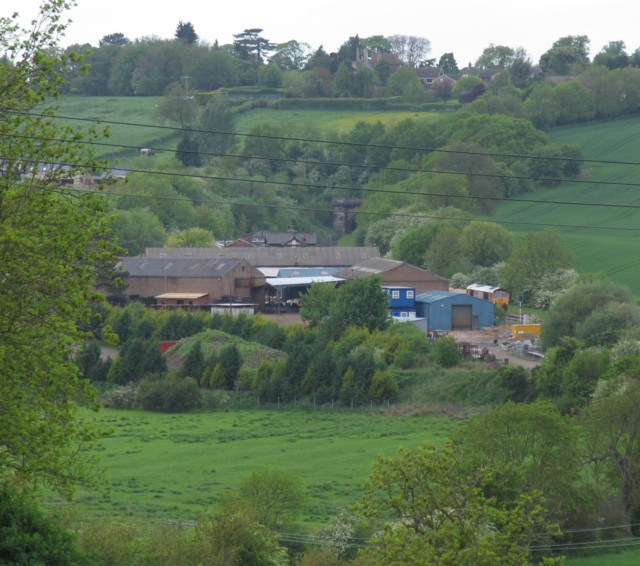
Industry at Manton Junction

Manton railway station or Manton Junction is a former railway station which served the villages of Manton and Wing in the county of Rutland.

== History ==
Opened in 1848 by the Syston and Peterborough Railway, the station was situated off the road connecting the two villages and was just over one mile (1.6 km) from each, or just over one-half mile (0.8 km) by the public footpaths that were soon established. It was one of only a handful of stations in the small county of Rutland; only Oakham is still open.

It served as the railhead for Uppingham, just over three and a half miles (6 km) away, and remained so for many journeys even after Uppingham gained its own station in the form of the LNWR branch line from Seaton.

In 1879 Manton became a junction when the Nottingham direct line of the Midland Railway was opened. This provided the Midland Railway with a new main line to Nottingham.

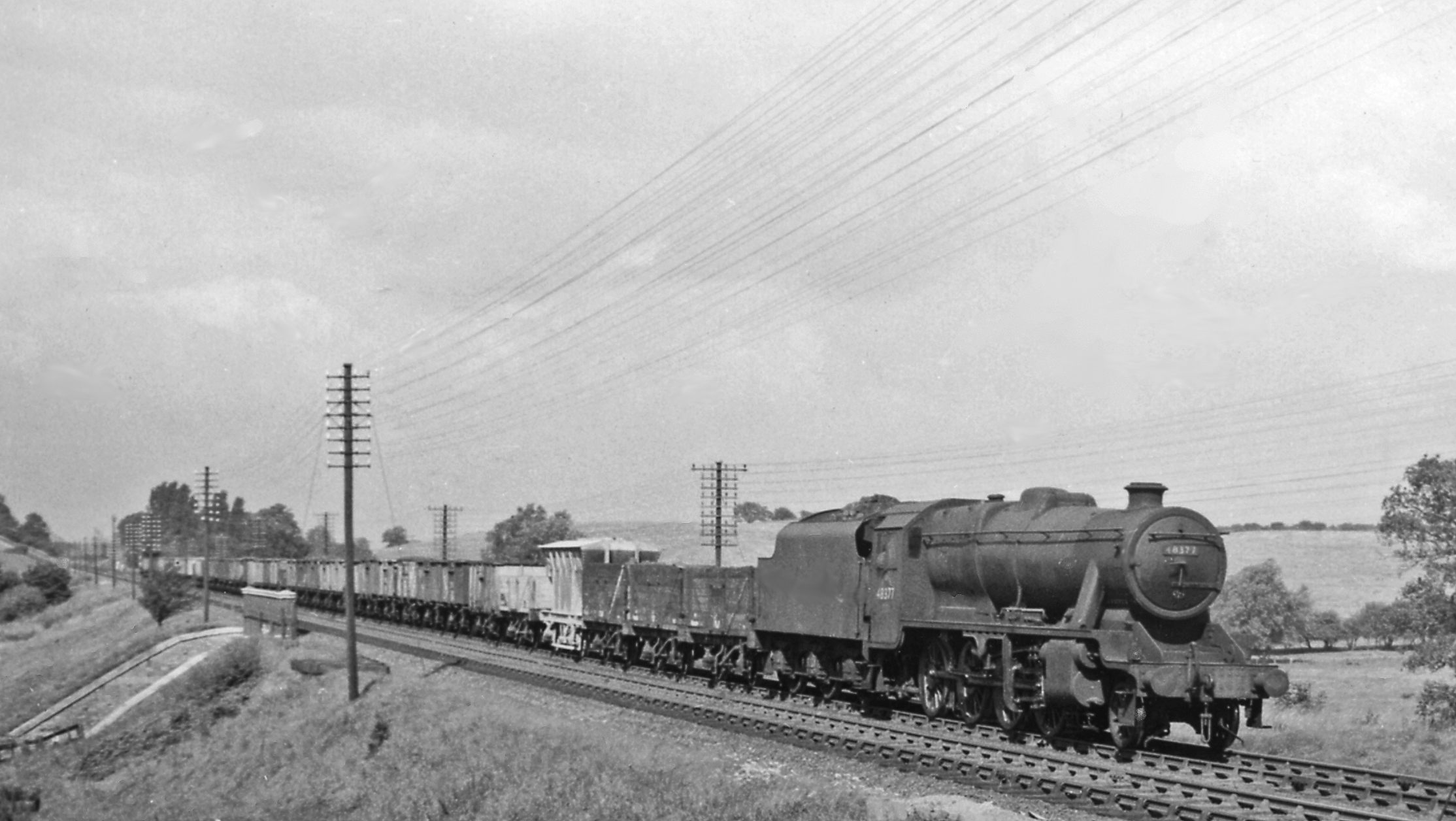
Manton up coal train under British Railways

Post-World War II, Manton was the sole calling point between Nottingham Midland and Kettering for "The Robin Hood", a named express service which operated from 1959 to 1962 between Nottingham and London St Pancras.

The station closed in 1966 and the station buildings are now used as a small industrial area. The signal box controlling the nearby junction is still operational.

The Oakham–Kettering line closed to passengers in 1967 but reopened in 2009 with currently two trains in each direction. The line remains important for freight and is occasionally used as a diversionary route for main-line passenger trains.

== Accidents ==
On 1 February 1853 a late running goods train detached a wagon at Manton. A passenger train collided with it in dense fog.

On 28 January 1889, Thomas Shillcock was cleaning a set of points near the tunnel mouth. To avoid a passing train he stepped onto the other line where he was struck by another train emerging from the tunnel. He was killed immediately.

On 24 May 1924, an explosion at the tunnel mouth led to the deaths of John Cockerill and William Hibbert, and injured Richard Shillaker, George Buckby and Thomas Shillcock (grandson of Thomas Shillcock, killed in 1889). A full account of the accident has been researched and published. The centenary was marked with a ceremony at Manton Junction signal box and a plaque is being erected on the tunnel.

== Stationmasters ==
- William Ward until 1861 (afterwards station master at Stamford)
- Henry Prime 1861 - 1864 (formerly station master at Ketton)
- J. Orton from 1864
- John Herbert until 1875 (afterwards station master at Hassop)
- Alexander McCall 1875 - 1876 (formerly station master at Melbourne, afterwards station master at Finchley Road)
- George Allen 1876 - 1877
- William Mee 1877 - 1882 (afterwards station master at Olney)
- William Glisbey 1882 - 1908
- Henry E. Haines 1908 - 1921 (formerly station master at Helpston)
- William Slater 1921 - 1928 (formerly station master at Oakley, afterwards station master at Olney)
- A. Alexander until 1946 (formerly station master at Frisby-on-the-Wreake)
- R.C.T. Wilson until 1950 (afterwards station master at Shefford)
- C.J.B. Wakefield until 1966

Preceding station	Disused railways	Following station
Oakham	Midland Railway; Leicester to Peterborough	Luffenham
Oakham	Midland Railway; Nottingham direct line of the Midland Railway	Harringworth
