= Great Glen railway station =

Former railway station in Leicestershire, England

Coordinates: 52.5607°N 1.0414°W

Great Glen
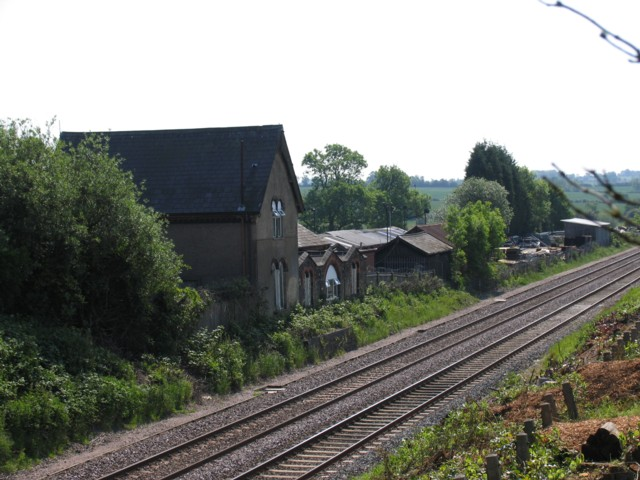

General information
- Location: Great Glen, Leicestershire, Harborough; England
- Grid reference: SP652962
- Platforms: 2

Other information
- Status: Disused

History
- Pre-grouping: Midland Railway
- Post-grouping: London, Midland and Scottish Railway; British Railways

Key dates
- 1857: Station opened as Glen (or Glenn)
- January 1897: Renamed Great Glen
- 1951: station closed for passengers
- 1964: Station closed completely
Location

Great Glen railway station was built by the Midland Railway in 1857 on its extension from Leicester to Bedford and Hitchin.

== History ==
Originally simply Glen, it was later renamed Glen Magna before receiving its final name. Passengers services finished in 1951, while goods services continued it was unstaffed in 1962, finally closing in 1964. The station houses remain and are occupied by a commercial business.

== Stationmasters ==
- George Fowler ca. 1859 - 1873
- S. Ellery 1873 - 1876 (formerly station master at Buckden, afterwards station master at Peak Forest)
- S. Ferguson 1876 - 1877 (formerly station master at Linby)
- W. Headford 1877 - 1880 (formerly station master at Buckden, afterwards station master at Wilnecote)
- R. Grice 1880 - 1881 (formerly station master at Darley Dale)
- Edward Richardson 1881 - 1884 (formerly station master at Frisby)
- C. Barnett 1884 - 1900 (formerly station master at Wickwar)
- Alfred William Kingdon 1900 - 1902 (afterwards station master at Kibworth)
- George Stephen Coleman 1902 - 1926 (afterwards station master at Narborough)
- J.L. Hadfield 1926 - 1935 (from 1929 also station master at Kibworth)
- William Hankins 1935 - ca. 1938 (formerly station master at Seaton, also station master of Kibworth)

== Route ==
Preceding station	Disused railways	Following station
Wigston Magna; Line open, station closed	Midland Railway; Midland Main Line	Kibworth; Line open, station closed
