= Ashley and Weston railway station =

Former railway station in Northamptonshire, England

Coordinates: 52.51682°N 0.83311°W

Ashley and Weston
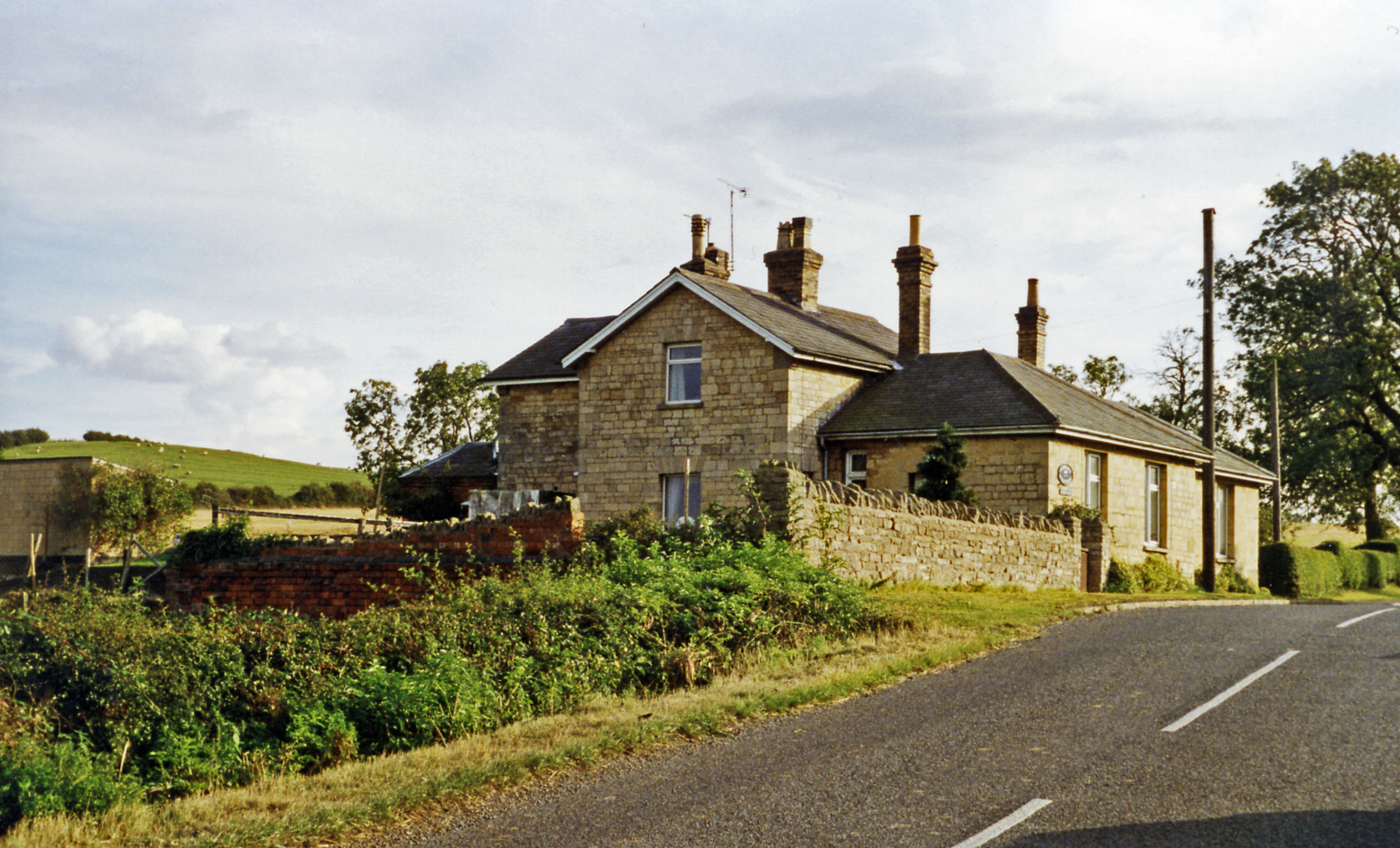
- Remains of the station in 1996

General information
- Location: Market Harborough, Northamptonshire; England
- Grid reference: SP791916
- Platforms: 2

Other information
- Status: Disused

History
- Pre-grouping: London and North Western Railway
- Post-grouping: London, Midland and Scottish Railway

Key dates
- 1 June 1850: Opened as Medbourne Bridge
- 1 Jan 1880: Renamed Ashley and Weston
- 18 June 1951: Closed for public services
- After June 1952: Final closure
Location

Ashley and Weston railway station was a station in Northamptonshire, serving the settlements of Ashley and Weston. It was located just east of Welham Junction.

== History ==
The station opened in 1850 on the Rugby and Stamford Railway and was originally named Medbourne Bridge. It was renamed before Medbourne railway station was opened on the Great Northern and London and North Western Joint Railway. It later became part of the London and North Western Railway and following the Grouping of 1923 it became part of the London, Midland and Scottish Railway. The station passed on to the London Midland Region of British Railways on nationalisation in 1948. The station was closed by British Railways for regular passenger services on 18 June 1951 but continued to be used by railway staff until 1952.

Extensive sidings were opened in 1904 to handle the amount of coal coming from Nottinghamshire and Derbyshire.

Former Services

Preceding station	Disused railways	Following station
Market Harborough	London and North Western Railway; Rugby and Stamford Railway	Rockingham

The station building survives today as a private residence.
