= Medbourne railway station =

Former railway station in Leicestershire, England

Coordinates: 52.5338°N 0.8213°W

Medbourne
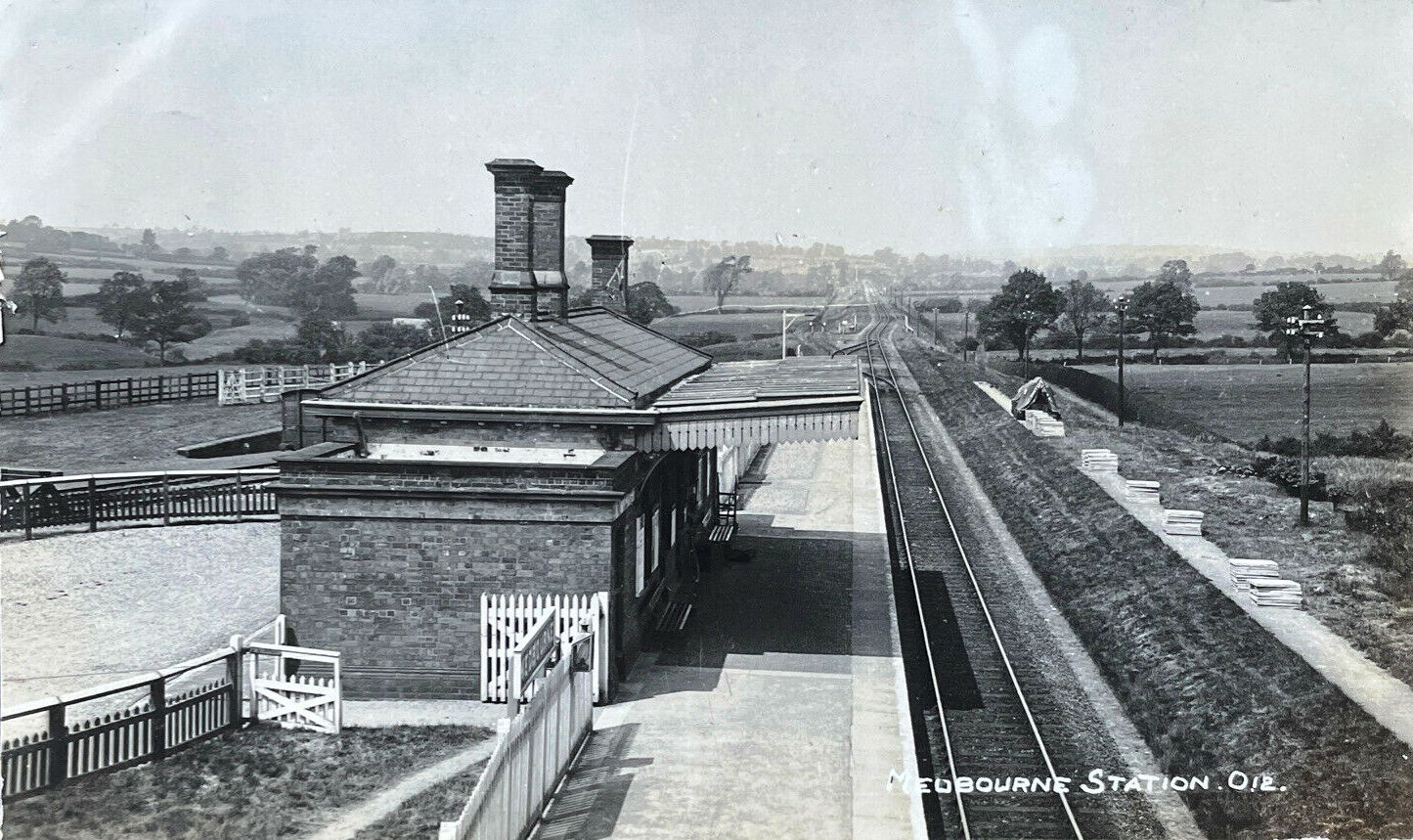
- The station in 1914

General information
- Location: Medbourne, Leicestershire; England
- Grid reference: SP801935
- Platforms: 2

Other information
- Status: Disused

History
- Pre-grouping: Great Northern and London and North Western Joint Railway

Key dates
- 1883: Opened
- 1916: Closed
Location

Medbourne railway station was a station in Medbourne, Leicestershire, on the Great Northern and London and North Western Joint Railway. It was between Hallaton junction to the north and Drayton junction to the south. Both junctions were connected to Welham Junction to the west.

== History ==
The station was built in 1879 by the LNWR but did not open until 1883, four years after the Great Northern completed the double-tracked line between Leicester Belgrave Road and Peterborough North. Services from the station were all GNR, hence the delayed date. In 1916, during the First World War, Medbourne station was closed to passengers as a war economy, although by this time the line had been reduced to single track. Shortly after the station closed, the building accidentally burned down, though the shell of the station remained until at least the second world war. After the station was closed to passengers, the route became a goods line. The branch was closed in 1964.

The village of Medbourne was also served by Ashley and Weston railway station to the south on the London and North Western Railway. The station, which was known as Medbourne Bridge until 1879, closed in 1952. The entire line was closed in 1964.

== Summary of Former Services ==
Preceding station	Disused railways	Following station
Hallaton	Great Northern Railway; Leicester Belgrave Road to Peterborough North	Rockingham

== Sample Train Timetable for April 1910 ==
The table below shows the train departures from Medbourne on weekdays in April 1910.

Departure	Going to	Calling at	Arrival	Operator
07.47	Peterborough North	Rockingham, Seaton, Wakerley & Barrowden, King's Cliffe, Nassington, Wansford, Castor, Overton, Peterborough North	08.48	GNR
10.33	Leicester Belgrave Road	Hallaton, East Norton, Tilton, Loseby, Ingersby, Thurnby & Scraptoft, Humberstone, Leicester Belgrave Road	11.22	GNR
11.03	Peterborough North	Rockingham, Seaton, Wakerley & Barrowden, King's Cliffe, Nassington, Wansford, Castor, Overton, Peterborough North	12.06	GNR
15.22	Leicester Belgrave Road	Hallaton, East Norton, Tilton, Loseby, Ingersby, Thurnby & Scraptoft, Humberstone, Leicester Belgrave Road	16.10	GNR
16.47	Peterborough North	Rockingham, Seaton, Wakerley & Barrowden, King's Cliffe, Nassington, Wansford, Castor, Peterborough North	17.46	GNR
20.27	Leicester Belgrave Road	Hallaton, East Norton, Tilton, Loseby, Ingersby, Thurnby & Scraptoft, Humberstone, Leicester Belgrave Road	21.11	GNR
