= Desborough railway station =

Former railway station in Northamptonshire, England

Coordinates: 52.4445°N 0.8188°W

Desborough and Rothwell
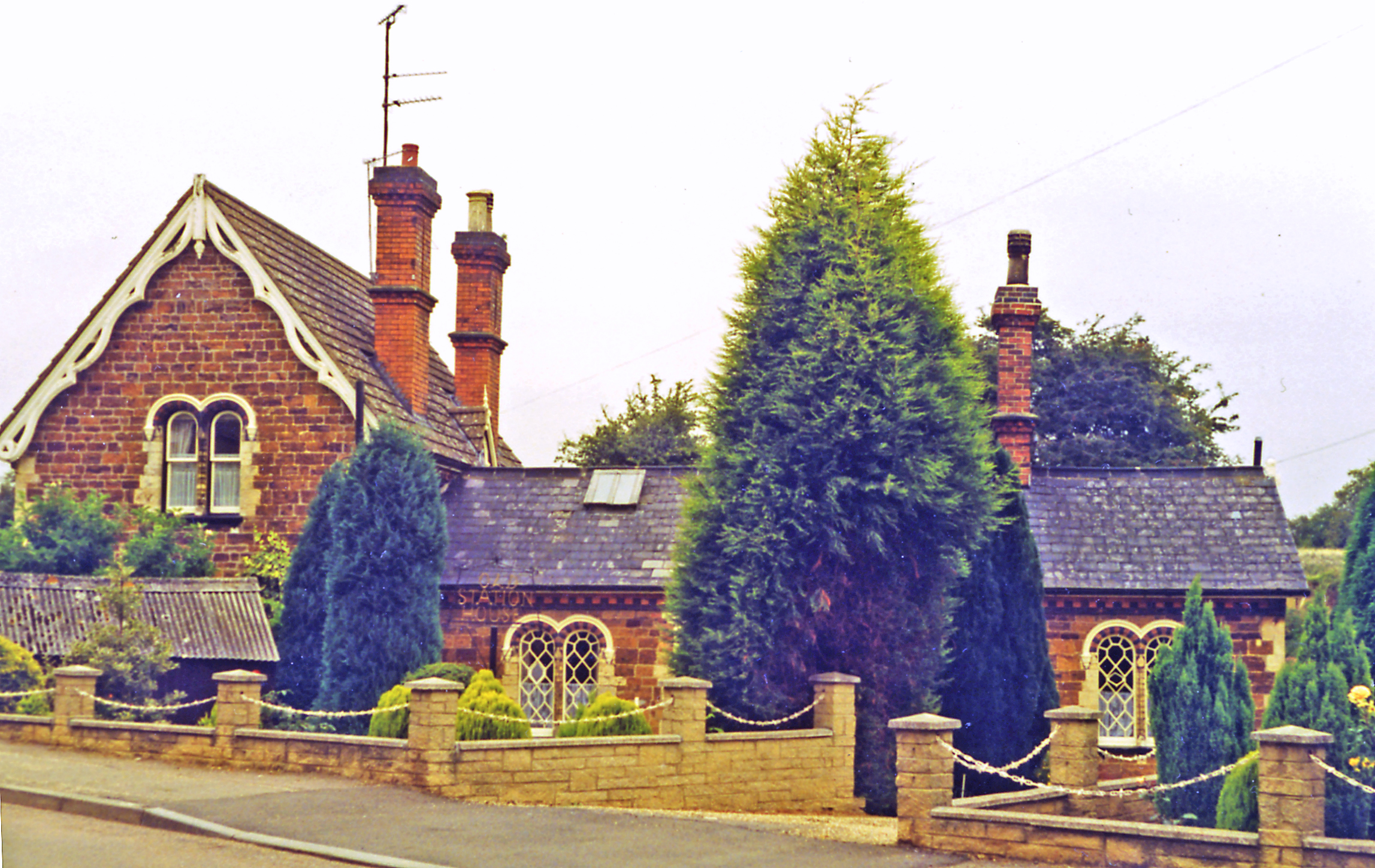
- Remains of the station in 1993

General information
- Location: Desborough, North Northamptonshire; England
- Platforms: 2

Other information
- Status: Disused

History
- Original company: Midland Railway
- Pre-grouping: Midland Railway
- Post-grouping: London, Midland and Scottish Railway

Key dates
- 8 May 1857: Opened as Desborough
- 1 October 1857: Renamed Desborough for Rothwell
- 17 October 1899: Renamed Desborough and Rothwell
- 1 January 1983: Closed
Location

Desborough and Rothwell railway station was a railway station built by the Midland Railway on its extension from Leicester to Bedford and Hitchin.

== History ==
The station originally opened on 8 May 1857 as Desborough.

On 20 May 1899, a tragic accident occurred when Elizabeth Palmer and her five-year Dixon Palmer, were struck by a fish train while crossing the tracks to reach the opposite platform. Both were killed instantly. As a result, by August 1899, the Midland Railway Company had received instructions from the Board of Trade to construct a footbridge over the tracks.

In response to a petition from the residents of Rothwell, the Midland Railway Company introduced a bus service between Rothwell and Desborough station in 1899. Subsequently, on 17 October 1899, the station was renamed Desborough and Rothwell.

The station closed in 1968. While the station building remain standing, much of the goods yard has been redeveloped, primarily for the Co-op but the goods yard area is now built-over, mainly given over to a Co-op Food store and its car park. The remaining land is occupied by Albany Sheds.

== Route ==
Preceding station	Disused railways	Following station
Market Harborough	Midland Railway; Midland Main Line	Glendon and Rushton
