= East Langton railway station =

Former railway station in Leicestershire, England

Coordinates: 52.5209°N 0.9396°W

East Langton
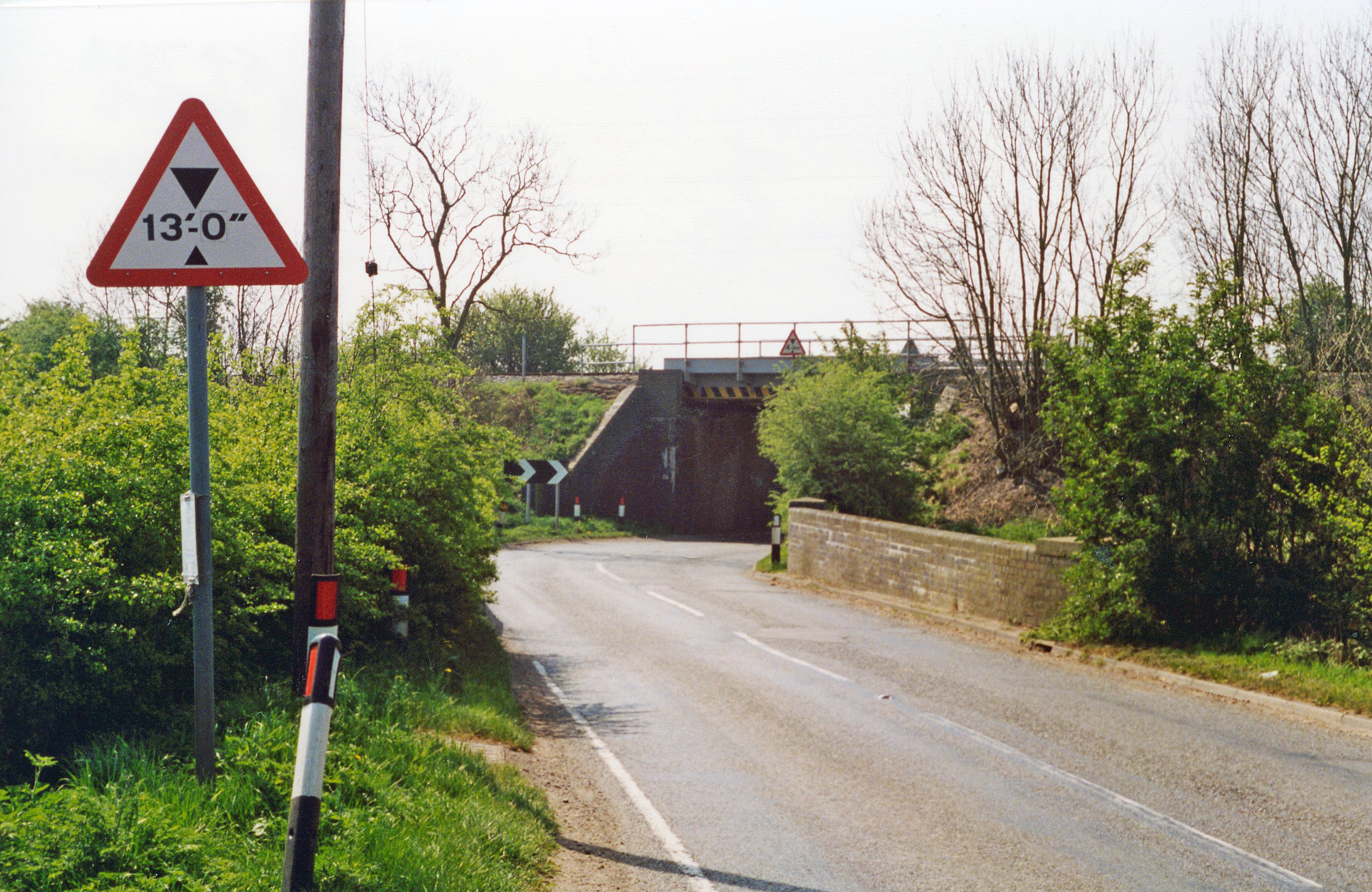
- Site of the station in 1995

General information
- Location: East Langton, Leicestershire, Harborough; England
- Platforms: 2

Other information
- Status: Disused

History
- Original company: Midland Railway
- Pre-grouping: Midland Railway
- Post-grouping: London, Midland and Scottish Railway; British Railways

Key dates
- 2 October 1876: opens as Langton
- 1 May 1891: renamed East Langton
- 1 January 1968: station closes
Location

East Langton railway station was opened by the Midland Railway on what is now the Midland Main Line, initially calling it simply Langton.

== History ==
The station was opened on 2 October 1876. A large party of Langtonians marked their appreciation by buying tickets for the 09.07 train to Kibworth, and returned by the 10.01.

The station was designed by Charles Henry Driver and the contractors were Mason and Son of Kibworth. The station had two platforms with neat Midland pattern timber buildings. The booking office was on the southbound up line, with a small waiting-room on the down. There was no footbridge and the line was crossed by a barrow crossing at the northern end. To the north were long sidings on either side of the running lines capable of handling trains of 30 to 41 wagons - typical for Victorian trains of the period. The signal box was next to these on the down side. Southbound LNWR trains also used the line on their way to a junction at Market Harborough and would signal their presence to the box by means of three whistles.

It was renamed East Langton in 1891 though it also served West Langton, Church Langton, Thorpe Langton and Tur Langton.

At grouping in 1923 it became part of the London Midland and Scottish Railway.

It closed in 1968. Although the station itself was demolished upon closure the site is now privately owned and even though most of the features have also been demolished a number do still remain, parts of the platform still exist, parts of the first loading dock are still constructed and the second loading dock is complete in its entirety. The current owner of the site was informed that the station was bulldozed into part of the embankment and objects surface every now and then. There have been a number of small digs to recover items over the years but nothing significant has emerged.

== Stationmasters ==
- John Potter 1876 - 1887
- Richard Oliver 1887 - 1895
- Frank Porter 1895 - 1898 (formerly station master at Burton Joyce, afterwards station master at Spondon)
- Ernest Clowes 1898 - 1903 (formerly station master at Castle Bytham, afterwards station master at Hathern)
- Frederick Betts 1903 - ca. 1914
- Arthur Melville Gill ca. 1923
- H.F. Wilson 1939 - 1943 (afterwards station master at Plumtree)
- L.H. Adams 1943 - 1945
- J. Hammond from 1945
- D. Cobb from 1949
- Brian Edge 1956 - 1957 (afterwards station master at Whalley)

== Route ==
Preceding station	Historical railways	Following station
Kibworth	Midland Railway; Midland Main Line	Market Harborough
