= Kibworth railway station =

Former railway station in Leicestershire, England

Coordinates: 52.5385°N 0.9937°W

Kibworth
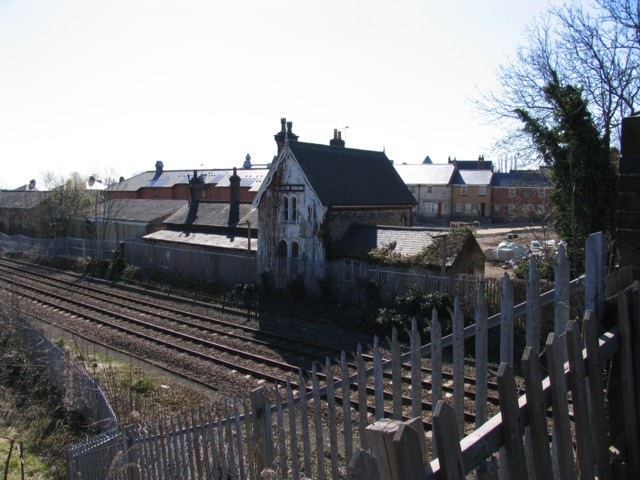

General information
- Location: Kibworth Beauchamp, Leicestershire, Harborough; England
- Grid reference: SP684939
- Platforms: 2

Other information
- Status: Disused

History
- Pre-grouping: Midland Railway
- Post-grouping: London, Midland and Scottish Railway; British Railways

Key dates
- 8 May 1857: Station opened
- 1 January 1968: Station closed
Location

Kibworth railway station was opened by the Midland Railway in 1857 on what is now the Midland Main Line.

== History ==
Plans had been made earlier in 1847 for a line from Leicester to Bedford, but had lapsed. However the Midland, running to Rugby at that time and dependent on the LNWR for its path into London, was looking for an alternative. It revived its plans for Bedford to go forward to Hitchin to join the Great Northern Railway.

The station was near the summit of the Kibworth Incline, the most northerly of the Leicester to Hitchin section. It was built next to the bridge carrying the highway from Kibworth Beauchamp, still known at Station Street, and access was by means of wooden stairs to each platform. The station buildings were of brick in the Midland Ecclesiastical Gothic style. The booking office and other facilities were on the down (northbound) platform, with a small waiting-room on the southbound.

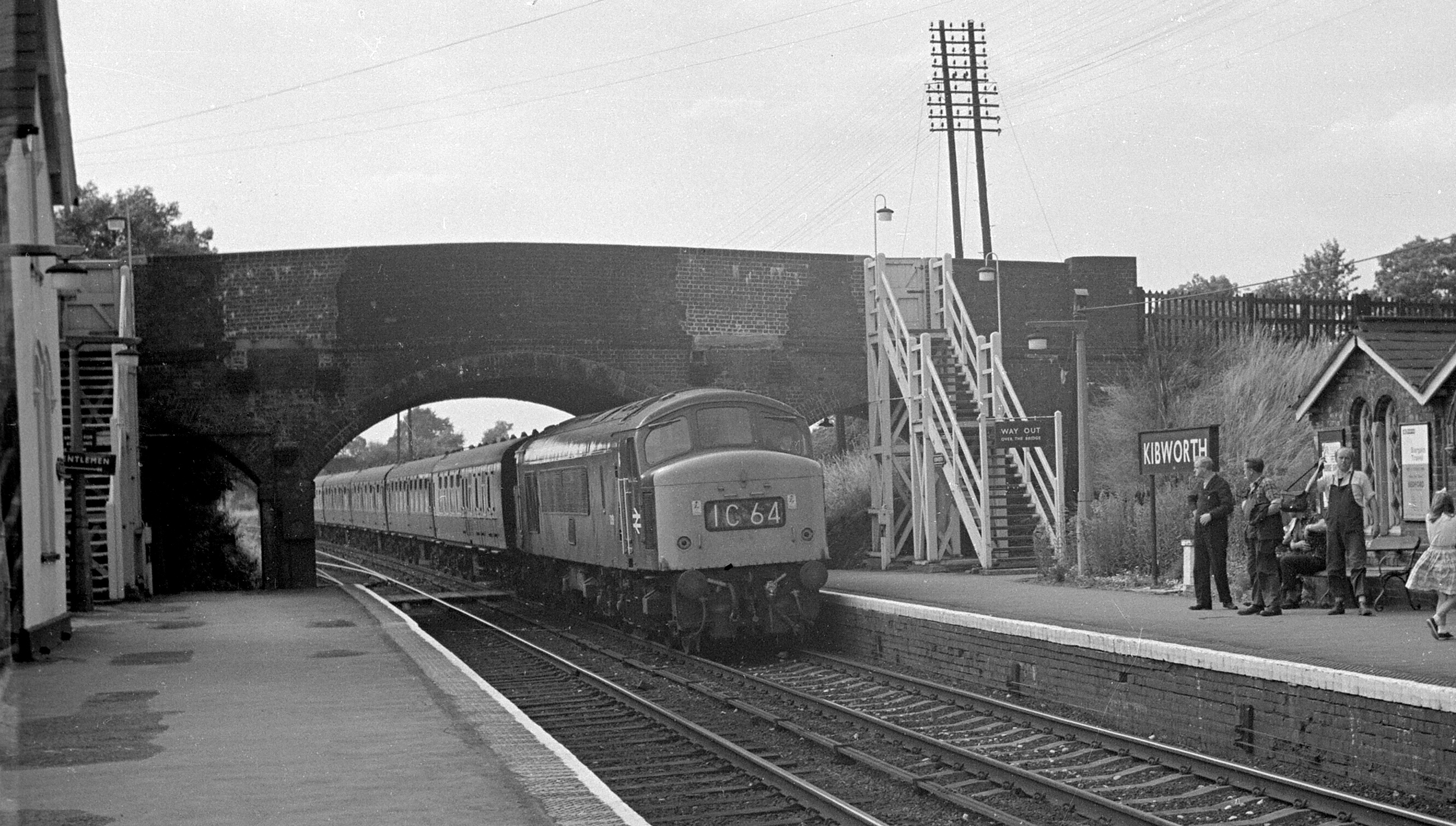
Kibworth station in 1967.

On the down side were two bay platforms, one running through a goods shed. These joined the running lines by a crossing, but also led back to longer sidings next to the down line. Next to the up line on the other side of the road bridge, was a short loop serving a cattle dock, and an unusual siding curving away from the running lines to some small sheds.

At grouping in 1923 it became part of the London Midland and Scottish Railway.

Goods services ended on 4 July 1966, and the station closed to passengers on 1 January 1968.

In recent years, it has housed a fencing and wood merchants business but became empty in 2002.

In the early 2000s, a number of houses were built on the car park. At some point, access to the line was removed, as were the platforms.

Preceding station	Historical railways	Following station
Great Glen	Midland Railway; Midland Main Line	East Langton
