= Market Harborough railway station =

Railway station in Leicestershire, England

Market Harborough
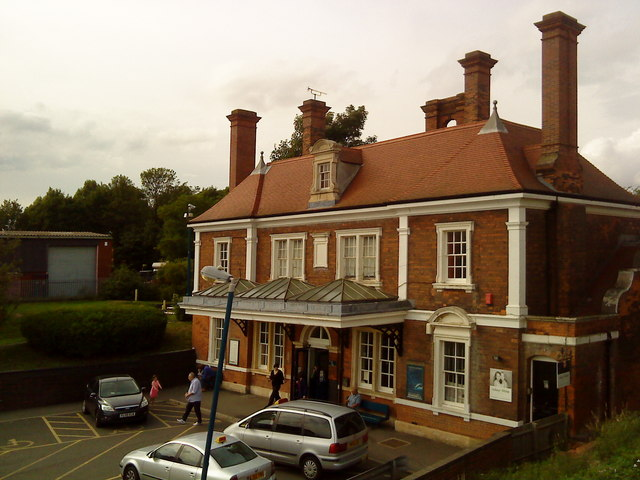
- The Grade II listed station building from 1884 by John Livock

General information
- Location: Market Harborough, Harborough; England
- Coordinates: 52.48°N 0.9094°W
- Grid reference: SP741874
- Manager: East Midlands Railway
- Platforms: 2

Other information
- Station code: MHR
- Classification: DfT category C2

History
- Opened: 1 May 1850

Passengers
- 2021/22: ▲0.531 million
- 2022/23: ▲0.763 million
- 2023/24: ▲0.883 million
- 2024/25: ▲0.943 million
- 2025/26: ▲1.053 million

Listed Building – Grade II
- Feature: Market Harborough Railway Station
- Designated: 25 March 1975
- Reference no.: 1074404
Location
Notes
- Passenger statistics from the Office of Rail and Road

Market Harborough railway station serves the town of Market Harborough, in Leicestershire, England. It is situated to the east of the town centre and lies on the Midland Main Line, 16 miles (26 km) south-east of Leicester. The building is Grade II listed.

== History ==
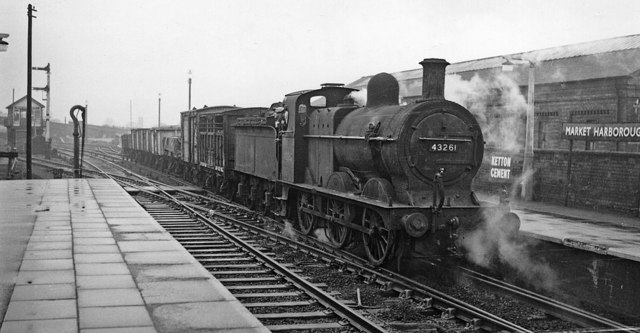
Market Harborough Station in 1957

The original station was opened on 1 May 1850 by the London and North Western Railway (LNWR); it was sited on the Rugby to Stamford branch of its main line from London Euston to Birmingham and the north-west.

The Midland Railway shared this station from May 1857 when it opened its extension from Leicester to Bedford and Hitchin. On 16 February 1859, the LNWR opened a further branch line, from Northampton to Market Harborough, which also used the same station.

As traffic built up, the Midland opened a new line on 14 September 1884 or 15 February 1886 at a higher elevation, crossing the LNWR and then running parallel to a new joint station, replacing the original station. The service on the original LNWR line was drastically reduced in 1960 and it finally closed on 6 June 1966.

On 5 June 1978, the new station buildings were reopened after being fully refurbished.

After privatisation, initial specification for the East Midlands Trains franchise, which started in 2007, would have seen a big reduction in the number of trains calling at Market Harborough. These plans were fought against by the Harborough Rail Users' Group and, as a result, the final specification saw no reduction in services.

=== Accidents and incidents ===
The station was the scene of a serious accident on 28 August 1862. An excursion train bound for Burton-upon-Trent stopped to pick up water and a second train bound for Leicester collided with the rear of it. The accident resulted in the death of one person and seventy were injured.

== Facilities ==
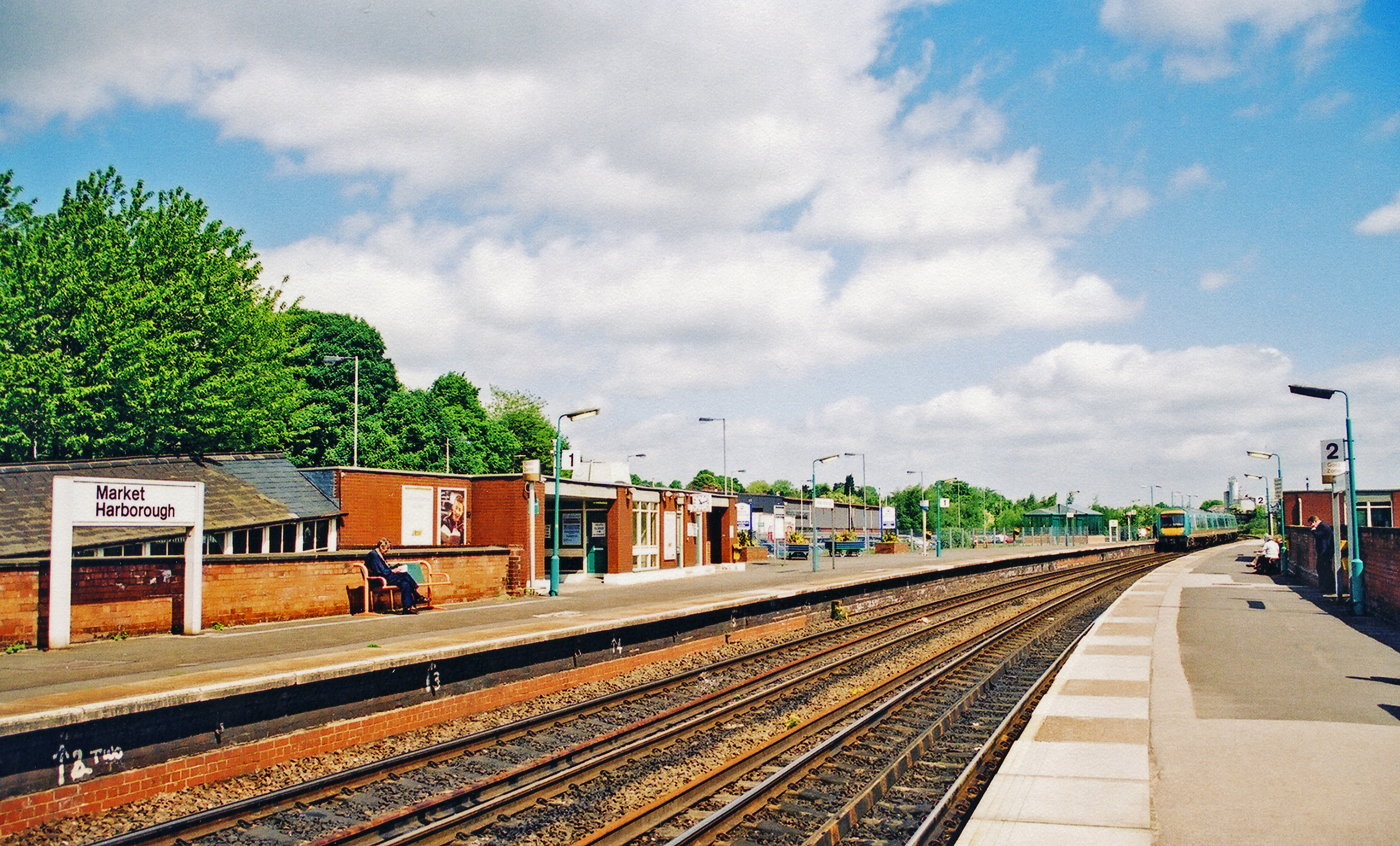
Market Harborough station before the most recent redevelopment

Stagecoach promised as part of their franchise bid that they would create additional car parking spaces at stations along their route. Market Harborough's new larger car park opened early in 2008.

The station also has a cycle hub, a taxi rank, accessible toilets, waiting rooms, a cafe, a vending machine and a ticket office. Both platforms have step-free access.

== Passenger volume ==
Passenger volume at Market Harborough
	2004–05	2005–06	2006–07	2007–08	2008–09	2009–10	2010–11	2011–12	2012–13	2013–14	2014–15	2015–16	2016–17	2017–18	2018–19	2019–20	2020–21	2021–22	2022–23	2023–24	2024–25
Entries and exits	574,947	593,571	660,824	701,661	717,862	674,720	719,798	752,108	764,698	797,890	832,000	870,166	888,036	894,246	907,770	898,058	150,866	531,140	762,792	882,598	943,468

The statistics cover twelve month periods that start in April.

== Services ==
Market Harborough is served by the fast and semi-fast East Midlands Railway services, operated by Class 222 Meridian. Trains to London are around every half hour and all off peak trains now start or end at Nottingham. All off-peak trains towards London call initially at Kettering, before running non stop to London St Pancras International. Fast services north to Nottingham call at Leicester only, whereas semi-fast services also call at Loughborough, East Midlands Parkway and Beeston.

In the morning and evening, some services are extended to Lincoln via Newark.

Preceding station	National Rail	Following station
Leicester	East Midlands Railway Midland Main Line	Kettering
	Historical railways	
East Langton Line open, station closed	Midland Railway Midland Main Line	Desborough Line open, station closed
	Disused railways	
Lubenham Line and station closed	London and North Western Railway Rugby and Stamford Railway	Ashley and Weston Line and station closed
Clipston and Oxendon Line and station closed	London and North Western Railway Northampton to Market Harborough Line	Hallaton Line and station closed

== Future ==
=== Market Harborough Line Speed Improvement project ===
Market Harborough station is located on a large curve on the Midland Main Line and as a result of this line speeds through the station have always been relatively slow, at around 60 mph (100 km/h). The track layout is set to change significantly as Network Rail engineers set about straightening the line as part of their overall plan to increase line speeds. It is also planned that both platforms will be extended. This work was originally scheduled to be complete by no later than 2012 but was completed by the end of 2019.

The project will deliver:

- A straighter line, enabling a line speed increase through Market Harborough and a reduction in journey time for passengers travelling between London and Sheffield
- A new 265m platform 1 and extended platform 2 to accommodate longer trains with more seats
- A new footbridge with lifts
- A new 300-space car park on the east side of the station (completed in 2018). Work to increase this in size to 500 spaces started in the summer of 2019 once the new track has been installed and tied in to the existing lines, freeing up the required space.

=== Electrification ===
Plans to electrify this part of the line (as part of the wider Electric Spine project), announced in 2012 and later resumed after a pause in 2015, were cancelled in 2017. However, in February 2019, Andrew Jones, Parliamentary Under Secretary of State for Transport, announced that electrification would be extended northwards from Kettering up to Market Harborough, enabling the connection of the railway to a new power supply point at Braybrooke. On 21 December 2021, the DfT officially announced that work on electrification of the section of line between Kettering and Market Harborough would start on 24 December 2021.

The next phase of major work saw a 12-mile section electrified between Market Harborough and Wigston in Leicestershire. Piling works began in August 2023, and electric trains started running through this section in July 2024.

== Bibliography ==
- Quick, Michael (2023). Railway Passenger Stations in Great Britain: A Chronology (PDF) (5th ed.). London: Railway and Canal Historical Society.
