= Luffenham railway station =

Former railway station in Rutland, England

Coordinates: 52.6135°N 0.6044°W

Luffenham
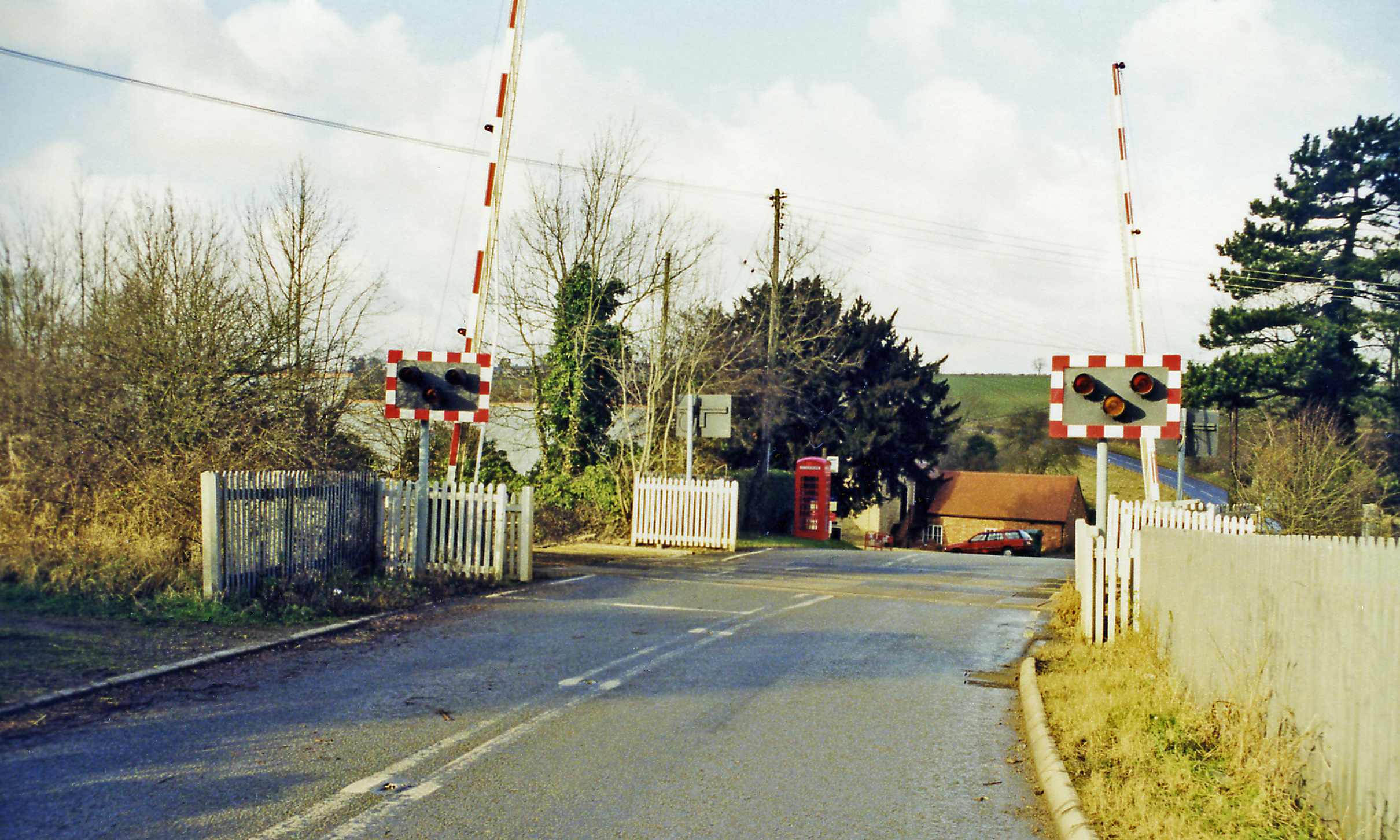
- Level-crossing at former station

General information
- Location: South Luffenham, Rutland; England
- Grid reference: SK945027
- Platforms: 2

Other information
- Status: Disused

History
- Pre-grouping: Midland Railway
- Post-grouping: London, Midland and Scottish Railway; London Midland Region of British Railways

Key dates
- 20 March 1848: Opened
- 2 June 1851: Seaton branch opened.
- 6 June 1966: Station and Seaton branch closed.
Location

The location of Luffenham Station, which served the villages of North and South Luffenham from 1848 to 1966

Luffenham railway station is a former station of the Syston and Peterborough Railway serving the villages of North and South Luffenham, Rutland.

== History ==
The contract for the erection of the station was obtained by Groocock and Yates of Leicester in 1847. The station was opened on 20 March 1848 by the Midland Railway and situated adjacent to a level crossing on the North Luffenham to Duddington road. It was about 0.8 miles from each village by road, although only 0.5 miles from South Luffenham by the public footpath that was soon established (and which still exists). It also became the junction for the London and North Western Railway's Rugby and Stamford Railway in 1850.

The substantial station buildings were of Italianate design and there was a goods shed next to the platform. There were three lines through the station, that for the main platform being a loop. There were sidings to both sides and originally two signal boxes, one of which was removed in the early 20th century. All of the local trains and many of the semi fasts called at the station. It closed to goods in 1964 and to passengers in 1966.

At grouping in 1923 it became part of the London Midland and Scottish Railway.

The line from Seaton was closed and lifted in 1966, but the main Midland line is still in operation for trains from Leicester to Peterborough.

== Station masters ==
- J. Smith until 1861
- Isaac Neale 1861 - 1864 (formerly station master at Saxby, afterwards station master at Yate)
- H. Simms from 1864 (formerly station master at Helpstone)
- A. Fewkes until 1872 (afterwards station master at Kildwick)
- Orlando Sims 1872 - 1877 (formerly station master at Ilkeston, afterwards station master at Denby)
- J. Camberland 1877 - 1879
- J Sampson 1879 - 1898 (formerly station master at Armathwaite)
- George Thomas Spires 1898 - 1925 (formerly station master at Ashwell)
- Harry Aiers 1925 - 1936 (afterwards station master at Woodville)
- J.A. Hodson ca. 1944
- Peter E. Collins 1951 - 1954
- P.A. Jepson from 1954 (formerly station master at Edmondthorpe and Wymondham)
Former Services

Preceding station	Disused railways	Following station
Manton	Midland Railway; Leicester to Peterborough line	Ketton & Collyweston
Morcott	London and North Western Railway; Seaton branch	Ketton & Collyweston

== Reopening proposal ==
The Welland Valley Rail partnership has proposed the reopening of Luffenham station and reinstating the 3.5 mile section of track between Seaton and South Luffenham on the Rugby and Stamford Railway route. This would enable a service to be introduced from Kettering, through Corby, Luffenham, Stamford, Peterborough, Whittlesea, March and terminating at a rebuilt station at Wisbech.
