= Uppingham railway station =

Former railway station in Rutland, England

Coordinates: 52.5855°N 0.7160°W

Uppingham
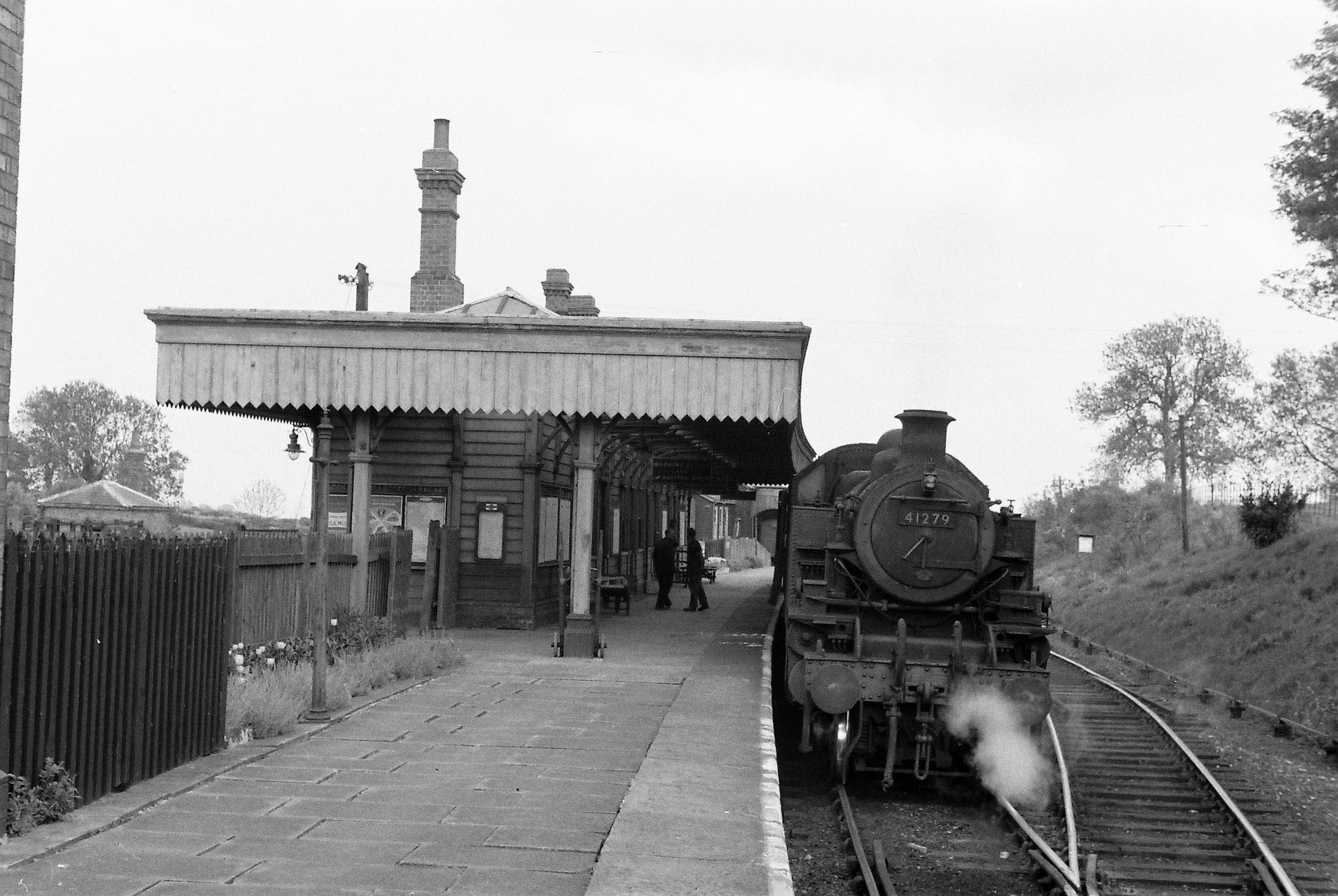

General information
- Location: Uppingham, Rutland; England
- Grid reference: SP872994
- Platforms: 1

Other information
- Status: Disused

History
- Pre-grouping: London and North Western Railway
- Post-grouping: London Midland and Scottish Railway

Key dates
- 1894: Opened
- 1960: Closed
Location

Uppingham railway station was a station in Uppingham, Rutland. It was the terminus of a branch line from Seaton and opened in 1894 and closed in 1960. In 1910, there were five trains daily to Seaton and four return (five on Fridays) and in 1922 there were also five but seven return.

The station buildings were demolished and the site became a small industrial area.

Preceding station	Disused railways	Following station
Terminus	London and North Western Railway	Seaton; Line and station closed
