= Stamford railway station =

Grade II* listed railway station in Lincolnshire, England

Stamford
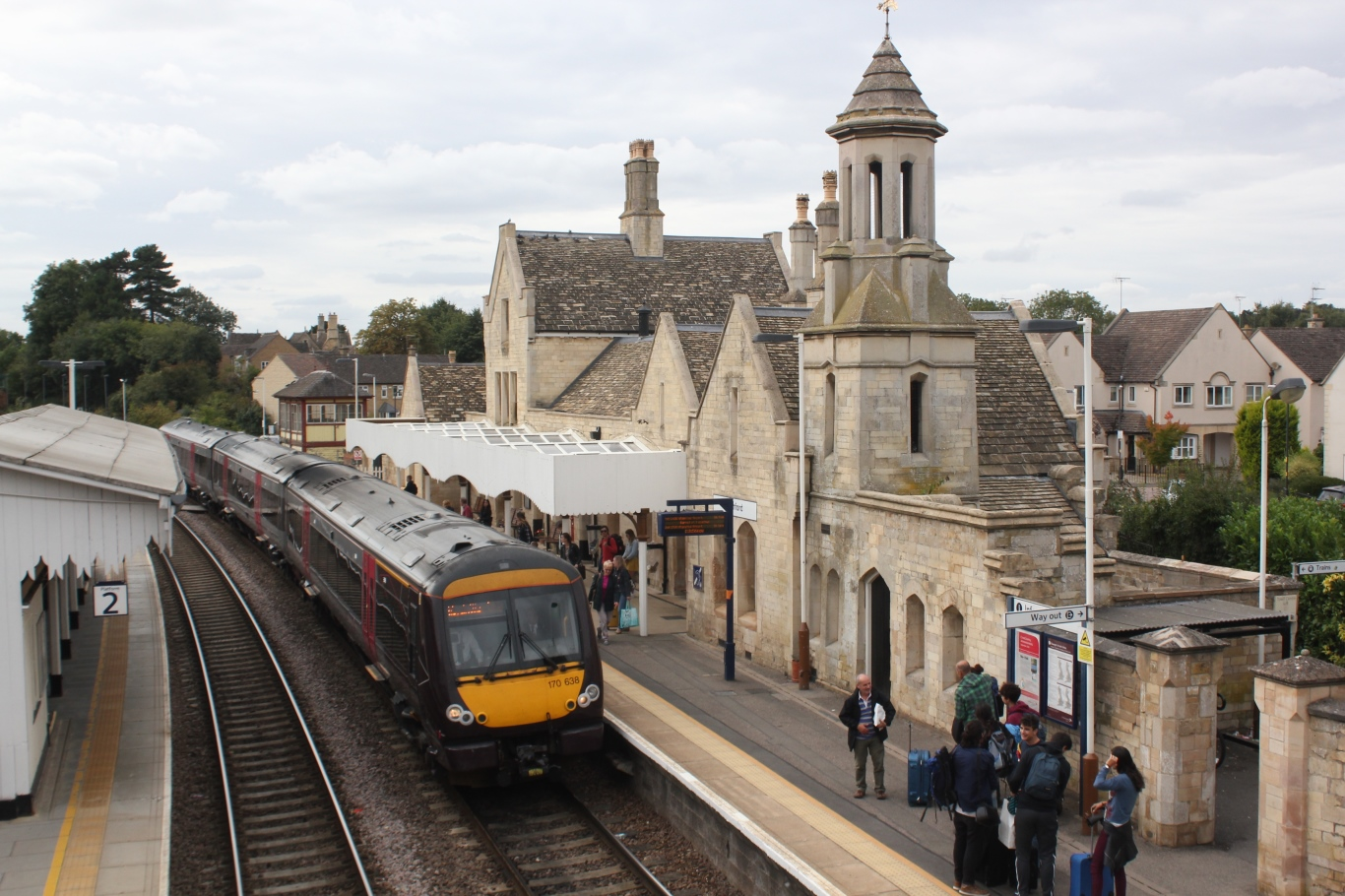

General information
- Location: Stamford, South Kesteven; England
- Coordinates: 52.6480°N 0.4798°W
- Grid reference: TF029066
- Manager: East Midlands Railway
- Platforms: 2

Other information
- Station code: SMD
- Classification: DfT category E

History
- Original company: Midland Railway
- Pre-grouping: Midland Railway
- Post-grouping: London, Midland and Scottish Railway

Key dates
- 1 May 1848: Opened as Stamford
- 29 September 1950: Renamed Stamford Town
- 18 April 1966: Renamed Stamford

Passengers
- 2020/21: ▼49,894
- 2021/22: ▲0.227 million
- 2022/23: ▲0.248 million
- 2023/24: ▲0.297 million
- 2024/25: ▲0.343 million
Location
Notes
- Passenger statistics from the Office of Rail and Road

Stamford railway station serves the town of Stamford in Lincolnshire, England, and is located in St Martin's. The station is 12.5 miles (20 km) west of Peterborough. It was opened by the Syston and Peterborough Railway, part of the present day Birmingham to Peterborough Line. CrossCountry operate the majority of services as part of their Birmingham to Stansted Airport route. It is owned by Network Rail and managed by East Midlands Railway

The station was formerly known as Stamford Town to distinguish it from the now closed Stamford East station in Water Street. It is often printed on timetables and train tickets as Stamford (Lincs) to distinguish it from either Stamford Hill station in London or Stanford-le-Hope station in Essex.

The station building is a fine stone structure in Mock Tudor style, influenced by the nearby Burghley House, and designed by Sancton Wood. It was upgraded to Grade II* listed building status in March 2020.

== History ==
=== Openings ===
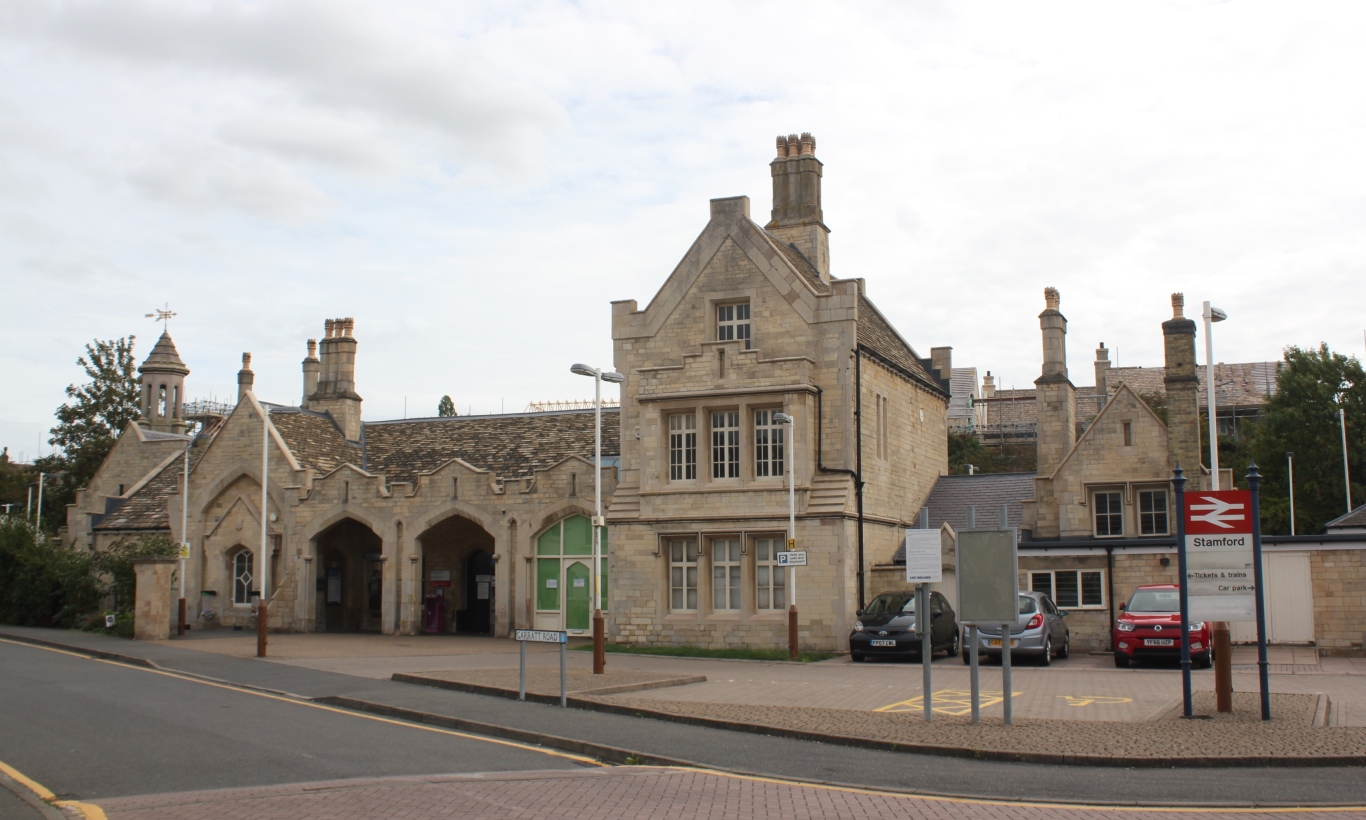
Sancton Wood's station building

Opened by the Midland Railway on its Syston and Peterborough Railway, train services began on 2 October 1846 on the Peterborough to Stamford section, using a temporary station in Water Street, as the tunnel was not complete. The contract for the erection of the permanent station was obtained by Groocock and Yates of Leicester in 1847. The permanent station opened along with through services to Leicester on 20 March 1848.

The London and North Western Railway opened their single track branch line from Rugby via Market Harborough on 2 June 1851. This actually joined the Midland line at Luffenham, but trains generally worked through to Stamford and terminated in the LNWR bay, platform 3, the far side of the current Leicester platform, which is now disused and filled in.

In 1863, the weekday train service comprised 5 each way per day on the Peterborough - Stamford - Leicester route, 3 each way per day on the Stamford - Market Harborough - Rugby route, and 1 each way per day on the Stamford - Market Harborough - Northampton route, including through coaches to London Euston, then known as Euston Square.

The LNWR Rugby line was double tracked in 1878, but in 1879 the LNWR built a new line from Seaton to Wansford on their existing Peterborough to Northampton Nene valley line, and from this time, Rugby to Peterborough was operated as the main line and the Stamford to Seaton section became a branch line, and was singled again in 1907.

=== Closures ===
When Stamford East station closed in 1957, the Stamford to Essendine services were diverted to Town station, but these services ceased in 1959. Some minor stations on the Midland line closed in the 1950s and 1960s and the remaining village stations such as Helpston and Ketton & Collyweston closed in 1966, along with the Seaton branch line from Luffenham.

=== 1970s ===
With the end of steam traction, the service in the 1970s and early 1980s generally comprised a stopping service formed of 2-car DMUs running between Peterborough and Leicester every two hours, supplemented by a two or three times a day Peterborough to Stamford shuttle service. There was also a four or five times daily through Birmingham to Norwich service usually formed by a Class 31 with four or five Mark 1 coaches, these services generally ran non-stop between Peterborough and Leicester.

=== 1980s ===
General goods services in Stamford finished in the late 1960s but the coal yard remained in use until 16 May 1983.

When the coal yard closed, the opportunity was also taken to close the signal box. All pointwork was removed and mechanical signals were replaced by colour lights controlled by Ketton signal box. Ketton signal box was retained due to the need to monitor the level crossing. With no crossover, the Peterborough to Stamford shuttles were for a time reversed at Ketton, before being withdrawn altogether.

With the line to the bay platform lifted, the bay was filled in to form a flowerbed.

=== 1990s ===
In the late 1990s, the toilets were closed, having been the subject of vandalism and variously available since the 1960s. The ticket office is only open in the mornings. The small bicycle rack outside the station was removed.

=== 2000s ===
Central Trains undertook internal modifications and refurbishment to the ticket office and booking hall towards the end of their franchise. Network Rail also invested £500,000 on refurbishment of the station building, modern lighting, overbridge and foot crossing to further update the station in late 2007.

In late July 2008, Network Rail was granted listed building consent to make alterations to the then Grade II listed station building to enable larger freight trains of W10 loading gauge to travel on the Peterborough to Nuneaton route. This will involve changes to the platform alignment and the platform canopy and a temporary platform will be provided during the works.

It was planned that both platforms would be extended by up to five metres by no later than 2012.

=== Historical services ===
Preceding station	Historical railways	Following station
Ketton & Collyweston	Midland Railway; Leicester to Peterborough	Uffington & Barnack
Ketton & Collyweston	London and North Western Railway; Seaton branch	Terminus

Timetable for February 1863

The table below shows the train departures from Stamford Town on weekdays in February 1863.

Departure	Going to	Calling at	Arrival	Operator
06.45	London Euston Square	Luffenham, Seaton, Rockingham, Medbourne Bridge, Market Harborough, Kelmarsh, Lamport, Brixworth, Brampton, Northampton Castle. Through coaches to Blisworth, Wolverton, Camden, London Euston Square	10.30	LNWR
07.10	Leicester	Ketton, Luffenham, Manton, Oakham, Ashwell, Whisendine, Saxby, Melton, Asfordby, Frisby, Brooksby, Rearsby, Syston, Leicester	09.10	MR
07.30	Rugby	Luffenham, Seaton, Rockingham, Medbourne Bridge, Market Harborough, Thedingworth, Welford & Kilworth, Stanford Hall, Lilbourne, Rugby	09.15	LNWR
09.03	Peterborough Great Eastern	Uffington & Barnack, Helpstone, Walton, Peterborough Crescent, Peterborough Great Eastern	09.40	MR
10.00	Rugby	Luffenham, Seaton, Rockingham, Medbourne Bridge, Market Harborough, Thedingworth, Welford & Kilworth, Stanford Hall, Lilbourne, Rugby	11.45	LNWR
10.47	Peterborough Great Eastern	Helpstone, Peterborough Crescent, Peterborough Great Eastern	11.20	MR
10.52	Leicester	Ketton, Luffenham, Manton, Oakham, Saxby, Melton, Syston, Leicester	12.20	MR
13.10	Leicester	Ketton, Luffenham, Manton, Oakham, Ashwell, Melton, Brooksby, Syston, Leicester	14.40	MR
14.11	Peterborough Great Eastern	Helpstone, Peterborough Crescent, Peterborough Great Eastern	14.40	MR
16.23	Leicester	Ketton, Luffenham, Manton, Oakham, Ashwell, Whisendine, Saxby, Melton, Asfordby, Frisby, Brooksby, Rearsby, Syston, Leicester	18.15	MR
16.45	Rugby	Luffenham, Seaton, Rockingham, Medbourne Bridge, Market Harborough, Thedingworth, Welford & Kilworth, Stanford Hall, Lilbourne, Rugby	18.35	LNWR
16.47	Peterborough Great Eastern	Uffington & Barnack, Helpstone, Walton, Peterborough Crescent, Peterborough Great Eastern	17.25	MR
20.44	Leicester	Ketton, Luffenham, Manton, Oakham, Ashwell, Saxby, Melton, Brooksby, Syston, Leicester	22.25	MR
21.52	Peterborough Great Eastern	Helpstone, Peterborough Crescent, Peterborough Great Eastern	22.20	MR

Timetable for July 1922

The table below shows the train departures from Stamford Town on weekdays in July 1922.

Departure	Going to	Calling at	Arrival	Operator
07.35	Seaton	Ketton, Luffenham, Morcott, Seaton	08.03	LNWR
08.20	Leicester	Ketton, Luffenham, Manton, Oakham, Ashwell, Whissendine, Saxby, Melton Mowbray, Asfordby, Frisby, Brooksby, Rearsby, Syston, Leicester	10.03	MR
08.53	Peterborough East	Uffington & Barnack, Helpston, Walton, Peterborough North, Peterborough East	09.33	MR
09.08	Seaton	Ketton, Luffenham, Morcott, Seaton	09.33	LNWR
09.39	Oakham	Ketton, Luffenham, Oakham	10.08	MR
10.41	Leicester	Ketton, Luffenham, Manton, Oakham, Melton Mowbray, Leicester	11.56	MR
10.43	Peterborough East	Uffington & Barnack, Helpston, Peterborough North, Peterborough East	11.20	MR
11.35	Seaton	Ketton, Luffenham, Morcott, Seaton	12.01	LNWR
11.46	Peterborough East	Peterborough North, Peterborough East	12.13	MR
12.33	Leicester	Ketton, Luffenham, Manton, Oakham, Ashwell, Whissendine, Saxby, Melton Mowbray, Leicester	14.00	MR
13.55	Seaton	Ketton, Luffenham, Morcott, Seaton	14.20	LNWR
14.30	Peterborough East	Uffington & Barnack, Helpston, Walton, Peterborough North, Peterborough East	15.08	MR
16.02	Leicester	Ketton, Luffenham, Manton, Oakham, Ashwell, Whissendine, Saxby, Melton Mowbray, Syston, Leicester	17.32	MR
16.15	Seaton	Ketton, Luffenham, Morcott, Seaton	16.40	LNWR
17.01	Peterborough East	Uffington & Barnack, Helpston, Walton, Peterborough North, Peterborough East	17.37	MR
17.38	Leicester	Ketton, Luffenham, Manton, Oakham, Saxby, Melton Mowbray, Asfordby, Frisby, Brooksby, Rearsby, Syston, Leicester	19.13	MR
17.48	Seaton	Ketton, Luffenham, Morcott, Seaton	18.11	LNWR
18.31	Peterborough East	Helpston, Peterborough North, Peterborough East	19.02	MR
19.43	Peterborough East	Helpston, Peterborough North, Peterborough East	20.20	MR
19.55	Seaton	Ketton, Luffenham, Morcott, Seaton	20.20	LNWR
20.45	Leicester	Ketton, Luffenham, Manton, Oakham, Ashwell, Melton Mowbray, Syston, Leicester	22.08	MR
22.40	Peterborough East	Peterborough North, Peterborough East	20.20	MR

== Services ==
From Stamford, CrossCountry operates a generally hourly service in each direction:

- Westbound towards Birmingham New Street, via Leicester.
- Eastbound towards Stansted Airport, via Cambridge.

Despite managing the station, East Midlands Railway only operates three daily services to the station, mainly for train crew route knowledge purposes; there are two early morning services to Norwich and a late night service to Nottingham.

Preceding station	National Rail	Following station
Oakham	CrossCountry Birmingham-Stansted Airport	Peterborough
Oakham Limited Service	East Midlands Railway Nottingham-Norwich (via Loughborough) Limited Service	Peterborough
