= Seaton railway station (Rutland) =

Former railway station in Rutland, England

Coordinates: 52.5716°N 0.6605°W

Seaton (Rutland)
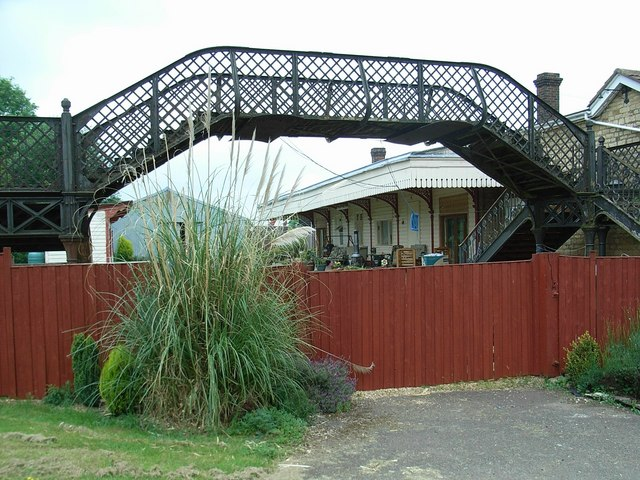
- The site of the station in 2007

General information
- Location: Seaton, Rutland; England
- Grid reference: SP908978
- Platforms: 3

Other information
- Status: Disused

History
- Pre-grouping: London and North Western Railway
- Post-grouping: London Midland and Scottish Railway

Key dates
- 2 June 1851: Opened as Seaton (Uppingham)
- Date unknown: Renamed Seaton and Uppingham
- 1 October 1894: Renamed Seaton
- 6 June 1966: Closed
Location

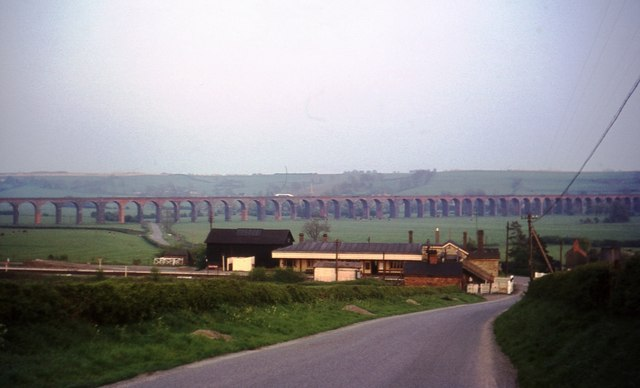
Seaton Station and Welland Viaduct, c.1967

Seaton railway station was a station serving the villages of Seaton in Rutland, and Harringworth, Northamptonshire.

The location of Seaton Station, which served the villages of Harringworth and Seaton from 1851–1966.

== History ==
It was originally a minor intermediate station on the London and North Western Railway single-track Rugby and Stamford Railway line, which opened in 1850. In 1873 it became a junction when the LNWR double-tracked the line from Rugby to Seaton and opened a new double-track line thence to Wansford. Rugby to Peterborough was then operated as the main line and Seaton to Stamford as a branch line. In 1894 the branch line to Uppingham was opened.

== Midland Railway ==
The Midland Railway Kettering to Manton line passes over the Welland Viaduct 1/3 mile (0.54 km) to the east, and slightly to the north thereof, passed over the Peterborough and Stamford lines and the Uppingham twice. There was never a connection. The nearest station on the Midland was 1 mile (1.6 km) away at Harringworth.

== Closure ==
The Uppingham branch closed to passengers in 1960, and the Rugby to Peterborough line and Stamford branch in 1966. The Great Northern Railway operated a service between Peterborough North and Leicester Belgrave Road between 1883 and 1916, when the service was withdrawn as a war economy.

Today the station site is a private home and scrapyard and the station building itself is now at least in part a private residence. Established in 1969, Seaton Salvage and Recycling Centre is a 3rd-generation, family-run business; it has announced its closure in 2026.

Preceding station	Disused railways	Following station
Rockingham	London and North Western Railway; Rugby to Peterborough East	Wakerley and Barrowden
Rockingham	Great Northern Railway; Leicester Belgrave Road to Peterborough North	Wakerley and Barrowden
Rockingham	London and North Western Railway; Rugby and Stamford Railway	Morcott
Terminus	London and North Western Railway; Uppingham branch	Uppingham

== Sample Train Timetable for April 1910 ==
The table below shows the train departures from Seaton on weekdays in April 1910.

Departure	Going to	Calling at	Arrival	Operator
03.29	Peterborough East	Wansford, Peterborough East	04.05	LNWR
03.35	Stamford	Stamford	03.52	LNWR
08.05	Peterborough North	Wakerley & Barrowden, King's Cliffe, Nassington, Wansford, Castor, Overton, Peterborough North	08.48	GNR
09.17	Rugby	Rockingham, Ashley & Weston, Market Harborough, Lubenham, Theddingworth, Welford & Kilworth, Yelverton & Stanford Park, Lilbourne, Clifton Mill, Rugby	10.34	LNWR
09.47	Peterborough East	Wakerley & Barrowden, King's Cliffe, Nassington, Wansford, Castor, Peterborough East	10.37	LNWR
09.50	Stamford	Morcott, Luffenham, Ketton & Collyweston, Stamford	10.16	LNWR
09.54	Uppingham	Uppingham	10.05	LNWR
10.14	Leicester Belgrave Road	Rockingham, Medbourne, Hallaton, East Norton, Tilton, Loseby, Ingersby, Thurnby & Scraptoft, Humberstone, Leicester Belgrave Road	11.22	GNR
11.21	Peterborough North	Wakerley & Barrowden, King's Cliffe, Nassington, Wansford, Castor, Overton, Peterborough North	12.06	GNR
12.09	Peterborough East	King's Cliffe, Wansford, Peterborough East	12.40	LNWR
12.10	Rugby	Rockingham, Ashley & Weston, Market Harborough, Lubenham, Theddingworth, Welford & Kilworth, Yelverton & Stanford Park, Lilbourne, Clifton Mill, Rugby	13.30	LNWR
12.12	Stamford	Morcott, Luffenham, Ketton & Collyweston, Stamford	12.35	LNWR
12.15	Uppingham	Uppingham	12.25	LNWR
14.20	Peterborough East	Wakerley & Barrowden, King's Cliffe, Nassington, Wansford, Overton, Peterborough East	15.05	LNWR
14.27	Rugby	Rockingham, Ashley & Weston, Market Harborough, Welford & Kilworth, Rugby	15.25	LNWR
14.30	Uppingham	Uppingham	14.40	LNWR
14.35	Stamford	Morcott, Luffenham, Ketton & Collyweston, Stamford	14.58	LNWR
15.03	Leicester Belgrave Road	Rockingham, Medbourne, Hallaton, East Norton, Tilton, Loseby, Ingersby, Thurnby & Scraptoft, Humberstone, Leicester Belgrave Road	16.10	GNR
17.04	Rugby	Rockingham, Ashley & Weston, Market Harborough, Lubenham, Theddingworth, Welford & Lutterworth, Yelverton & Stanford Park, Lilbourne, Clifton Mill, Rugby	18.23	LNWR
17.04	Peterborough North	Wakerley & Barrowden, King's Cliffe, Nassington, Wansford, Castor, Peterborough North	17.46	GNR
17.10; Fri only	Uppingham	Uppingham	17.20	LNWR
18.17	Uppingham	Uppingham	18.27	LNWR
18.19	Stamford	Morcott, Luffenham, Ketton & Collyweston, Stamford	18.42	LNWR
19.10	Market Harborough	Rockingham, Ashley & Weston, Market Harborough	19.35	LNWR
20.08	Leicester Belgrave Road	Rockingham, Medbourne, Hallaton, East Norton, Tilton, Loseby, Ingersby, Thurnby & Scraptoft, Humberstone, Leicester Belgrave Road	21.11	GNR
22.08	Peterborough East	Wakerley & Barrowden, King's Cliffe, Nassington, Wansford, Peterborough East	22.48	LNWR
20.35	Rugby	Market Harborough, Welford & Lutterworth, Rugby	21.32	LNWR
22.11	Stamford	Luffenham, Ketton & Collyweston, Stamford	22.32	LNWR
